= 1975 Giro d'Italia, Stage 12 to Stage 21 =

Cycling race stages

The 1975 Giro d'Italia was the 58th edition of the Giro d'Italia, one of cycling's Grand Tours. The Giro began in Milan on 17 May, and Stage 12 occurred on 29 May with a stage from Chianciano Terme. The race finished at the Stelvio Pass on 7 June.

== Stage 12 ==
28 May 1975 — Chianciano Terme to Forte dei Marmi, 232 km (144 mi)

Stage 12 result

Rank	Rider	Team	Time
1	Patrick Sercu (BEL)	Brooklyn	6h 32' 08"
2	Rik Van Linden (BEL)	Bianchi–Campagnolo	s.t.
3	Roger De Vlaeminck (BEL)	Brooklyn	s.t.
4	Marino Basso (ITA)	Magniflex	s.t.
5	Javier Elorriaga (ESP)	Kas–Kaskol	s.t.
6	Luciano Borgognoni (ITA)	Zonca–Santini	s.t.
7	Pierino Gavazzi (ITA)	Jollj Ceramica	s.t.
8	Roland Salm (SUI)	Zonca–Santini	s.t.
9	Domingo Perurena (ESP)	Kas–Kaskol	s.t.
10	Miguel María Lasa (ESP)	Kas–Kaskol	s.t.

General classification after Stage 12

Rank	Rider	Team	Time
1	Francisco Galdós (ESP)	Kas–Kaskol	70h 26' 46"
2	Giovanni Battaglin (ITA)	Jollj Ceramica	+ 23"
3	Fausto Bertoglio (ITA)	Jollj Ceramica	+ 1' 24"
4	Costantino Conti (ITA)	Furzi{{main other|	+ 1' 55"
5	Miguel María Lasa (ESP)	Kas–Kaskol	+ 3' 07"
6	Felice Gimondi (ITA)	Bianchi–Campagnolo	+ 3' 30"
7	Gianbattista Baronchelli (ITA)	Scic	s.t.
8	Walter Riccomi (ITA)	Scic	+ 3' 42"
9	Giuseppe Perletto (ITA)	Magniflex	+ 3' 49"
10	Wladimiro Panizza (ITA)	Brooklyn	+ 3' 52"

== Stage 13 ==
29 May 1975 — Forte dei Marmi to Forte dei Marmi, 38 km (24 mi) (ITT)

Stage 13 result

Rank	Rider	Team	Time
1	Giovanni Battaglin (ITA)	Jollj Ceramica	47' 04"
2	Felice Gimondi (ITA)	Bianchi–Campagnolo	+ 13"
3	Luciano Borgognoni (ITA)	Zonca–Santini	+ 16"
4	Roger De Vlaeminck (BEL)	Brooklyn	+ 18"
5	Gianbattista Baronchelli (ITA)	Scic	+ 36"
6	Fausto Bertoglio (ITA)	Jollj Ceramica	+ 41"
7	Knut Knudsen (NOR)	Jollj Ceramica	s.t.
8	Louis Pfenninger (SUI)	Zonca–Santini	+ 1' 07"
9	Roland Salm (SUI)	Zonca–Santini	+ 1' 36"
10	Martin Emilio Rodriguez (COL)	Bianchi–Campagnolo	+ 1' 38"

General classification after Stage 13

Rank	Rider	Team	Time
1	Giovanni Battaglin (ITA)	Jollj Ceramica	71h 14' 13"
2	Fausto Bertoglio (ITA)	Jollj Ceramica	+ 1' 42"
3	Francisco Galdós (ESP)	Kas–Kaskol	+ 2' 40"
4	Felice Gimondi (ITA)	Bianchi–Campagnolo	+ 3' 20"
5	Gianbattista Baronchelli (ITA)	Scic	+ 3' 43"
6	Roger De Vlaeminck (BEL)	Brooklyn	+ 4' 48"
7	Giuseppe Perletto (ITA)	Magniflex	+ 5' 09"
8	Walter Riccomi (ITA)	Scic	+ 5' 10"
9	Miguel María Lasa (ESP)	Kas–Kaskol	+ 5' 29"
10	Wladimiro Panizza (ITA)	Brooklyn	+ 5' 37"

== Rest day ==
30 May 1975

== Stage 14 ==
31 May 1975 — Il Ciocco to Il Ciocco, 13 km (8.1 mi) (ITT)

Stage 14 result

Rank	Rider	Team	Time
1	Fausto Bertoglio (ITA)	Jollj Ceramica	28' 01"
2	Giuseppe Perletto (ITA)	Magniflex	+ 43"
3	Gianbattista Baronchelli (ITA)	Scic	+ 59"
4	Francisco Galdós (ESP)	Kas–Kaskol	+ 1' 02"
5	Wladimiro Panizza (ITA)	Brooklyn	+ 1' 09"
6	Felice Gimondi (ITA)	Bianchi–Campagnolo	+ 1' 22"
7	Walter Riccomi (ITA)	Scic	+ 1' 28"
8	Roger De Vlaeminck (BEL)	Brooklyn	+ 1' 40"
9	Giovanni Battaglin (ITA)	Jollj Ceramica	+ 1' 48"
10	Miguel María Lasa (ESP)	Kas–Kaskol	+ 1' 50"

General classification after Stage 14

Rank	Rider	Team	Time
1	Fausto Bertoglio (ITA)	Jollj Ceramica	71h 43' 56"
2	Giovanni Battaglin (ITA)	Jollj Ceramica	+ 6"
3	Francisco Galdós (ESP)	Kas–Kaskol	+ 2' 00"
4	Felice Gimondi (ITA)	Bianchi–Campagnolo	+ 3' 00"
5	Gianbattista Baronchelli (ITA)	Scic	s.t.
6	Giuseppe Perletto (ITA)	Magniflex	+ 4' 10"
7	Roger De Vlaeminck (BEL)	Brooklyn	+ 4' 46"
8	Walter Riccomi (ITA)	Scic	+ 4' 56"
9	Wladimiro Panizza (ITA)	Brooklyn	+ 5' 14"
10	Miguel María Lasa (ESP)	Kas–Kaskol	+ 5' 30"

== Stage 15 ==
1 June 1975 — Il Ciocco to Arenzano, 203 km (126 mi)

Stage 15 result

Rank	Rider	Team	Time
1	Franco Bitossi (ITA)	Scic	5h 00' 10"
2	Enrico Paolini (ITA)	Scic	s.t.
3	Miguel María Lasa (ESP)	Kas–Kaskol	s.t.
4	Roger De Vlaeminck (BEL)	Brooklyn	s.t.
5	Louis Pfenninger (SUI)	Zonca–Santini	s.t.
6	Felice Gimondi (ITA)	Bianchi–Campagnolo	s.t.
7	Marcello Osler (ITA)	Brooklyn	s.t.
8	Fausto Bertoglio (ITA)	Jollj Ceramica	s.t.
9	Costantino Conti (ITA)	Furzi{{main other|	s.t.
10	Giacinto Santambrogio (ITA)	Bianchi–Campagnolo	s.t.

General classification after Stage 15

Rank	Rider	Team	Time
1	Fausto Bertoglio (ITA)	Jollj Ceramica	76h 44' 06"
2	Francisco Galdós (ESP)	Kas–Kaskol	+ 2' 00"
3	Felice Gimondi (ITA)	Bianchi–Campagnolo	+ 3' 00"
4	Gianbattista Baronchelli (ITA)	Scic	s.t.
5	Giuseppe Perletto (ITA)	Magniflex	+ 4' 10"
6	Roger De Vlaeminck (BEL)	Brooklyn	+ 4' 46"
7	Walter Riccomi (ITA)	Scic	+ 4' 56"
8	Wladimiro Panizza (ITA)	Brooklyn	+ 5' 04"
9	Miguel María Lasa (ESP)	Kas–Kaskol	+ 5' 37"
10	Costantino Conti (ITA)	Furzi{{main other|	+ 7' 08"

== Stage 16 ==
2 June 1975 — Arenzano to Orta San Giulio, 193 km (120 mi)

Stage 16 result

Rank	Rider	Team	Time
1	Fabrizio Fabbri (ITA)	Bianchi–Campagnolo	4h 56' 03"
2	Valerio Lualdi (ITA)	Brooklyn	s.t.
3	Sebastián Pozo (ESP)	Kas–Kaskol	s.t.
4	Rik Van Linden (BEL)	Bianchi–Campagnolo	s.t.
5	Simone Fraccaro (ITA)	Bianchi–Campagnolo	s.t.
6	Enrico Paolini (ITA)	Scic	s.t.
7	Roger De Vlaeminck (BEL)	Brooklyn	s.t.
8	Luciano Borgognoni (ITA)	Zonca–Santini	s.t.
9	Patrick Sercu (BEL)	Brooklyn	s.t.
10	Roland Salm (SUI)	Zonca–Santini	s.t.

General classification after Stage 16

Rank	Rider	Team	Time
1	Fausto Bertoglio (ITA)	Jollj Ceramica	81h 40' 12"
2	Francisco Galdós (ESP)	Kas–Kaskol	+ 2' 00"
3	Felice Gimondi (ITA)	Bianchi–Campagnolo	+ 3' 00"
4	Gianbattista Baronchelli (ITA)	Scic	s.t.
5	Giuseppe Perletto (ITA)	Magniflex	+ 4' 10"
6	Roger De Vlaeminck (BEL)	Brooklyn	+ 4' 46"
7	Walter Riccomi (ITA)	Scic	+ 4' 56"
8	Wladimiro Panizza (ITA)	Brooklyn	+ 5' 04"
9	Miguel María Lasa (ESP)	Kas–Kaskol	+ 5' 37"
10	Costantino Conti (ITA)	Furzi{{main other|	+ 7' 08"

== Stage 17a ==
3 June 1975 — Omegna to Pontoglio, 167 km (104 mi)

Stage 17a result

Rank	Rider	Team	Time
1	Patrick Sercu (BEL)	Brooklyn	4h 32' 40"
2	Marino Basso (ITA)	Magniflex	s.t.
3	Roger De Vlaeminck (BEL)	Brooklyn	s.t.
4	Franco Bitossi (ITA)	Scic	s.t.
5	Bruno Vicino (ITA)	Jollj Ceramica	s.t.
6	Giancarlo Tartoni (ITA)	Furzi{{main other|	s.t.
7	Alessio Antonini (ITA)	Jollj Ceramica	s.t.
8	Pierino Gavazzi (ITA)	Jollj Ceramica	s.t.
9	Enrico Paolini (ITA)	Scic	s.t.
10	Willy De Geest (BEL)	Brooklyn	s.t.

General classification after Stage 17a

Rank	Rider	Team	Time
1	Fausto Bertoglio (ITA)	Jollj Ceramica	

== Stage 17b ==
3 June 1975 — Pontoglio to Monte Maddalena, 46 km (29 mi)

Stage 17b result

Rank	Rider	Team	Time
1	Wladimiro Panizza (ITA)	Brooklyn	1h 12' 27"
2	Fausto Bertoglio (ITA)	Jollj Ceramica	+ 11"
3	Gianbattista Baronchelli (ITA)	Scic	s.t.
4	Francisco Galdós (ESP)	Kas–Kaskol	+ 15"
5	Giuseppe Perletto (ITA)	Magniflex	s.t.
6	Andrés Oliva (ESP)	Kas–Kaskol	+ 24"
7	Felice Gimondi (ITA)	Bianchi–Campagnolo	s.t.
8	Roger De Vlaeminck (BEL)	Brooklyn	+ 35"
9	Costantino Conti (ITA)	Furzi{{main other|	+ 49"
10	Miguel María Lasa (ESP)	Kas–Kaskol	s.t.

General classification after Stage 17b

Rank	Rider	Team	Time
1	Fausto Bertoglio (ITA)	Jollj Ceramica	87h 25' 29"
2	Francisco Galdós (ESP)	Kas–Kaskol	+ 2' 04"
3	Gianbattista Baronchelli (ITA)	Scic	+ 3' 00"
4	Felice Gimondi (ITA)	Bianchi–Campagnolo	+ 3' 13"
5	Giuseppe Perletto (ITA)	Magniflex	+ 4' 15"
6	Wladimiro Panizza (ITA)	Brooklyn	+ 4' 53"
7	Roger De Vlaeminck (BEL)	Brooklyn	+ 5' 10"
8	Walter Riccomi (ITA)	Scic	+ 5' 57"
9	Miguel María Lasa (ESP)	Kas–Kaskol	+ 6' 15"
10	Costantino Conti (ITA)	Furzi{{main other|	+ 7' 46"

== Stage 18 ==
4 June 1975 — Brescia to Baselga di Piné, 223 km (139 mi)

Stage 18 result

Rank	Rider	Team	Time
1	Roger De Vlaeminck (BEL)	Brooklyn	6h 54' 31"
2	Felice Gimondi (ITA)	Bianchi–Campagnolo	s.t.
3	Giacinto Santambrogio (ITA)	Bianchi–Campagnolo	s.t.
4	Miguel María Lasa (ESP)	Kas–Kaskol	s.t.
5	Fausto Bertoglio (ITA)	Jollj Ceramica	s.t.
6	Walter Riccomi (ITA)	Scic	s.t.
7	Gianbattista Baronchelli (ITA)	Scic	s.t.
8	Francisco Galdós (ESP)	Kas–Kaskol	s.t.
9	Wladimiro Panizza (ITA)	Brooklyn	s.t.
10	Fabrizio Fabbri (ITA)	Bianchi–Campagnolo	s.t.

General classification after Stage 18

Rank	Rider	Team	Time
1	Fausto Bertoglio (ITA)	Jollj Ceramica	94h 20' 00"
2	Francisco Galdós (ESP)	Kas–Kaskol	+ 2' 04"
3	Gianbattista Baronchelli (ITA)	Scic	+ 3' 00"
4	Felice Gimondi (ITA)	Bianchi–Campagnolo	+ 3' 13"
5	Wladimiro Panizza (ITA)	Brooklyn	+ 4' 53"
6	Roger De Vlaeminck (BEL)	Brooklyn	+ 5' 10"
7	Walter Riccomi (ITA)	Scic	+ 5' 57"
8	Giuseppe Perletto (ITA)	Magniflex	+ 6' 03"
9	Miguel María Lasa (ESP)	Kas–Kaskol	+ 6' 15"
10	Fabrizio Fabbri (ITA)	Bianchi–Campagnolo	+ 10' 04"

== Stage 19 ==
5 June 1975 — Baselga di Piné to Pordenone, 175 km (109 mi)

Stage 19 result

Rank	Rider	Team	Time
1	Martin Emilio Rodriguez (COL)	Bianchi–Campagnolo	3h 54' 36"
2	Adriano Pella (ITA)	Zonca–Santini	s.t.
3	Javier Elorriaga (ESP)	Kas–Kaskol	+ 6"
4	Bruno Vicino (ITA)	Jollj Ceramica	s.t.
5	Marcello Osler (ITA)	Brooklyn	s.t.
6	Renato Laghi (ITA)	Scic	s.t.
7	Davide Boifava (ITA)	Furzi{{main other|	+ 9"
8	Rik Van Linden (BEL)	Bianchi–Campagnolo	+ 11' 37"
9	Pierino Gavazzi (ITA)	Jollj Ceramica	s.t.
10	Enrico Paolini (ITA)	Scic	s.t.

General classification after Stage 19

Rank	Rider	Team	Time
1	Fausto Bertoglio (ITA)	Jollj Ceramica	98h 26' 13"
2	Francisco Galdós (ESP)	Kas–Kaskol	+ 2' 09"
3	Gianbattista Baronchelli (ITA)	Scic	+ 3' 00"
4	Felice Gimondi (ITA)	Bianchi–Campagnolo	+ 3' 13"
5	Wladimiro Panizza (ITA)	Brooklyn	+ 4' 53"
6	Roger De Vlaeminck (BEL)	Brooklyn	+ 5' 10"
7	Davide Boifava (ITA)	Furzi{{main other|	+ 5' 15"
8	Walter Riccomi (ITA)	Scic	+ 5' 57"
9	Giuseppe Perletto (ITA)	Magniflex	+ 6' 03"
10	Miguel María Lasa (ESP)	Kas–Kaskol	+ 6' 15"

== Stage 20 ==
6 June 1975 — Pordenone to Alleghe, 197 km (122 mi)

Stage 20 result

Rank	Rider	Team	Time
1	Roger De Vlaeminck (BEL)	Brooklyn	6h 18' 27"
2	Costantino Conti (ITA)	Furzi{{main other|	s.t.
3	Francisco Galdós (ESP)	Kas–Kaskol	+ 3"
4	Felice Gimondi (ITA)	Bianchi–Campagnolo	+ 1' 23"
5	Fausto Bertoglio (ITA)	Jollj Ceramica	+ 1' 26"
6	Giancarlo Polidori (ITA)	Furzi{{main other|	+ 2' 06"
7	Simone Fraccaro (ITA)	Bianchi–Campagnolo	s.t.
8	Walter Riccomi (ITA)	Scic	s.t.
9	Giancarlo Bellini (ITA)	Brooklyn	s.t.
10	Miguel María Lasa (ESP)	Kas–Kaskol	s.t.

General classification after Stage 20

Rank	Rider	Team	Time
1	Fausto Bertoglio (ITA)	Jollj Ceramica	104h 46' 06"
2	Francisco Galdós (ESP)	Kas–Kaskol	+ 41"
3	Felice Gimondi (ITA)	Bianchi–Campagnolo	+ 3' 10"
4	Gianbattista Baronchelli (ITA)	Scic	+ 3' 40"
5	Roger De Vlaeminck (BEL)	Brooklyn	+ 3' 44"
6	Wladimiro Panizza (ITA)	Brooklyn	+ 5' 33"
7	Walter Riccomi (ITA)	Scic	+ 6' 37"
8	Giuseppe Perletto (ITA)	Magniflex	+ 6' 43"
9	Miguel María Lasa (ESP)	Kas–Kaskol	+ 6' 55"
10	Costantino Conti (ITA)	Furzi{{main other|	s.t.

== Stage 21 ==
7 June 1975 — Alleghe to Passo dello Stelvio, 186 km (116 mi)

Stage 21 result

Rank	Rider	Team	Time
1	Francisco Galdós (ESP)	Kas–Kaskol	6h 45' 18"
2	Fausto Bertoglio (ITA)	Jollj Ceramica	s.t.
3	Giuseppe Perletto (ITA)	Magniflex	+ 1' 17"
4	Costantino Conti (ITA)	Furzi{{main other|	+ 2' 25"
5	Wladimiro Panizza (ITA)	Brooklyn	+ 2' 40"
6	Felice Gimondi (ITA)	Bianchi–Campagnolo	+ 3' 08"
7	Roger De Vlaeminck (BEL)	Brooklyn	+ 3' 55"
8	Giancarlo Bellini (ITA)	Brooklyn	s.t.
9	Walter Riccomi (ITA)	Scic	s.t.
10	Marcello Bergamo (ITA)	Jollj Ceramica	+ 4' 10"

General classification after Stage 21

Rank	Rider	Team	Time
1	Fausto Bertoglio (ITA)	Jollj Ceramica	111h 31' 34"
2	Francisco Galdós (ESP)	Kas–Kaskol	+ 41"
3	Felice Gimondi (ITA)	Bianchi–Campagnolo	+ 6' 18"
4	Roger De Vlaeminck (BEL)	Brooklyn	+ 7' 39"
5	Giuseppe Perletto (ITA)	Magniflex	+ 8' 00"
6	Wladimiro Panizza (ITA)	Brooklyn	+ 8' 13"
7	Walter Riccomi (ITA)	Scic	+ 10' 32"
8	Costantino Conti (ITA)	Furzi{{main other|	+ 13' 40"
9	Miguel María Lasa (ESP)	Kas–Kaskol	+ 14' 48"
10	Gianbattista Baronchelli (ITA)	Scic	s.t.
