= 1975 Giro d'Italia, Stage 1 to Stage 11 =

Cycling race stages

The 1975 Giro d'Italia was the 58th edition of the Giro d'Italia, one of cycling's Grand Tours. The Giro began in Milan on 17 May, and Stage 11 occurred on 28 May with a stage to Orvieto. The race finished at the Stelvio Pass on 7 June.

== Stage 1 ==
17 May 1975 — Milan to Fiorano Modenese, 177 km (110 mi)

Stage 1 result and general classification after Stage 1

Rank	Rider	Team	Time
1	Knut Knudsen (NOR)	Jollj Ceramica	4h 15' 35"
2	Rik Van Linden (BEL)	Bianchi–Campagnolo	s.t.
3	Henk Poppe (NED)	Frisol–G.B.C.	s.t.
4	Patrick Sercu (BEL)	Brooklyn	s.t.
5	Pierino Gavazzi (ITA)	Jollj Ceramica	s.t.
6	Theo Smit (NED)	Frisol–G.B.C.	s.t.
7	Roger De Vlaeminck (BEL)	Brooklyn	s.t.
8	Alfredo Chinetti (ITA)	Furzi	s.t.
9	Giacomo Bazzan (ITA)	Jollj Ceramica	s.t.
10	Adriano Pella (ITA)	Zonca–Santini	s.t.

== Stage 2 ==
18 May 1975 — Modena to Ancona, 249 km (155 mi)

Stage 2 result

Rank	Rider	Team	Time
1	Patrick Sercu (BEL)	Brooklyn	6h 05' 18"
2	Rik Van Linden (BEL)	Bianchi–Campagnolo	s.t.
3	Pierino Gavazzi (ITA)	Jollj Ceramica	s.t.
4	Roger De Vlaeminck (BEL)	Brooklyn	s.t.
5	Giacomo Bazzan (ITA)	Jollj Ceramica	s.t.
6	Javier Elorriaga (ESP)	Kas–Kaskol	s.t.
7	Theo Smit (NED)	Frisol–G.B.C.	s.t.
8	Aldo Parecchini (ITA)	Brooklyn	s.t.
9	Marino Basso (ITA)	Magniflex	s.t.
10	Luciano Borgognoni (ITA)	Zonca–Santini	s.t.

General classification after Stage 2

Rank	Rider	Team	Time
1	Knut Knudsen (NOR)	Jollj Ceramica	10h 20' 53"
2	Rik Van Linden (BEL)	Bianchi–Campagnolo	s.t.
3	Henk Poppe (NED)	Frisol–G.B.C.	s.t.
4	Patrick Sercu (BEL)	Brooklyn	s.t.
5	Pierino Gavazzi (ITA)	Jollj Ceramica	s.t.
6	Theo Smit (NED)	Frisol–G.B.C.	s.t.
7	Roger De Vlaeminck (BEL)	Brooklyn	s.t.
8	Alfredo Chinetti (ITA)	Furzi	s.t.
9	Giacomo Bazzan (ITA)	Jollj Ceramica	s.t.
10	Adriano Pella (ITA)	Zonca–Santini	s.t.

== Stage 3 ==
19 May 1975 — Ancona to Prati di Tivo, 175 km (109 mi)

Stage 3 result

Rank	Rider	Team	Time
1	Giovanni Battaglin (ITA)	Jollj Ceramica	5h 02' 03"
2	Francisco Galdós (ESP)	Kas–Kaskol	+ 21"
3	Miguel María Lasa (ESP)	Kas–Kaskol	+ 1' 53"
4	Fabrizio Fabbri (ITA)	Bianchi–Campagnolo	+ 2' 14"
5	Marcello Bergamo (ITA)	Jollj Ceramica	s.t.
6	Franco Bitossi (ITA)	Scic	+ 2' 16"
7	Costantino Conti (ITA)	Furzi	s.t.
8	Felice Gimondi (ITA)	Bianchi–Campagnolo	s.t.
9	Gianbattista Baronchelli (ITA)	Scic	s.t.
10	Fausto Bertoglio (ITA)	Jollj Ceramica	s.t.

General classification after Stage 3

Rank	Rider	Team	Time
1	Giovanni Battaglin (ITA)	Jollj Ceramica	15h 22' 56"
2	Francisco Galdós (ESP)	Kas–Kaskol	+ 21"
3	Miguel María Lasa (ESP)	Kas–Kaskol	+ 1' 53"
4	Marcello Bergamo (ITA)	Jollj Ceramica	
5	Fabrizio Fabbri (ITA)	Bianchi–Campagnolo	
6	Franco Bitossi (ITA)	Scic	+ 2' 16"
7	Gianbattista Baronchelli (ITA)	Scic	s.t.
8	Felice Gimondi (ITA)	Bianchi–Campagnolo	s.t.
9	Fausto Bertoglio (ITA)	Jollj Ceramica	s.t.
10	Costantino Conti (ITA)	Furzi	s.t.

== Stage 4 ==
20 May 1975 — Teramo to Campobasso, 258 km (160 mi)

Stage 4 result

Rank	Rider	Team	Time
1	Roger De Vlaeminck (BEL)	Brooklyn	7h 51' 54"
2	Pierino Gavazzi (ITA)	Jollj Ceramica	s.t.
3	Marcello Bergamo (ITA)	Jollj Ceramica	s.t.
4	Felice Gimondi (ITA)	Bianchi–Campagnolo	s.t.
5	Domingo Perurena (ESP)	Kas–Kaskol	s.t.
6	Marino Basso (ITA)	Magniflex	s.t.
7	Franco Bitossi (ITA)	Scic	s.t.
8	Giancarlo Polidori (ITA)	Furzi	s.t.
9	Gianbattista Baronchelli (ITA)	Scic	s.t.
10	Miguel María Lasa (ESP)	Kas–Kaskol	s.t.

General classification after Stage 4

Rank	Rider	Team	Time
1	Francisco Galdós (ESP)	Kas–Kaskol	23h 15' 11"
2	Giovanni Battaglin (ITA)	Jollj Ceramica	+ 23"
3	Miguel María Lasa (ESP)	Kas–Kaskol	+ 1' 32"
4	Marcello Bergamo (ITA)	Jollj Ceramica	+ 1' 53"
5	Fabrizio Fabbri (ITA)	Bianchi–Campagnolo	s.t.
6	Franco Bitossi (ITA)	Scic	+ 1' 55"
7	Gianbattista Baronchelli (ITA)	Scic	s.t.
8	Felice Gimondi (ITA)	Bianchi–Campagnolo	s.t.
9	Fausto Bertoglio (ITA)	Jollj Ceramica	s.t.
10	Costantino Conti (ITA)	Furzi	s.t.

== Stage 5 ==
21 May 1975 — Campobasso to Bari, 224 km (139 mi)

Stage 5 result

Rank	Rider	Team	Time
1	Rik Van Linden (BEL)	Bianchi–Campagnolo	6h 23' 46"
2	Patrick Sercu (BEL)	Brooklyn	s.t.
3	Marino Basso (ITA)	Magniflex	s.t.
4	Roger De Vlaeminck (BEL)	Brooklyn	s.t.
5	Franco Bitossi (ITA)	Scic	s.t.
6	Luciano Borgognoni (ITA)	Zonca–Santini	s.t.
7	Roland Salm (SUI)	Zonca–Santini	s.t.
8	Giacomo Bazzan (ITA)	Jollj Ceramica	s.t.
9	Javier Elorriaga (ESP)	Kas–Kaskol	s.t.
10	Enrico Paolini (ITA)	Scic	s.t.

General classification after Stage 5

Rank	Rider	Team	Time
1	Francisco Galdós (ESP)	Kas–Kaskol	29h 38' 57"
2	Giovanni Battaglin (ITA)	Jollj Ceramica	+ 23"
3	Miguel María Lasa (ESP)	Kas–Kaskol	+ 1' 32"
4	Marcello Bergamo (ITA)	Jollj Ceramica	+ 1' 53"
5	Fabrizio Fabbri (ITA)	Bianchi–Campagnolo	s.t.
6	Franco Bitossi (ITA)	Scic	+ 1' 55"
7	Gianbattista Baronchelli (ITA)	Scic	s.t.
8	Felice Gimondi (ITA)	Bianchi–Campagnolo	s.t.
9	Fausto Bertoglio (ITA)	Jollj Ceramica	s.t.
10	Costantino Conti (ITA)	Furzi	s.t.

== Stage 6 ==
22 May 1975 — Bari to Castrovillari, 213 km (132 mi)

Stage 6 result

Rank	Rider	Team	Time
1	Roger De Vlaeminck (BEL)	Brooklyn	6h 24' 48"
2	Rik Van Linden (BEL)	Bianchi–Campagnolo	s.t.
3	Marino Basso (ITA)	Magniflex	s.t.
4	Domingo Perurena (ESP)	Kas–Kaskol	s.t.
5	Patrick Sercu (BEL)	Brooklyn	s.t.
6	Enrico Paolini (ITA)	Scic	s.t.
7	Franco Bitossi (ITA)	Scic	s.t.
8	Javier Elorriaga (ESP)	Kas–Kaskol	s.t.
9	Giancarlo Polidori (ITA)	Furzi	s.t.
10	Aldo Parecchini (ITA)	Brooklyn	s.t.

General classification after Stage 6

Rank	Rider	Team	Time
1	Francisco Galdós (ESP)	Kas–Kaskol	36h 03' 45"
2	Giovanni Battaglin (ITA)	Jollj Ceramica	+ 23"
3	Miguel María Lasa (ESP)	Kas–Kaskol	+ 1' 32"
4	Marcello Bergamo (ITA)	Jollj Ceramica	+ 1' 53"
5	Fabrizio Fabbri (ITA)	Bianchi–Campagnolo	s.t.
6	Franco Bitossi (ITA)	Scic	+ 1' 55"
7	Gianbattista Baronchelli (ITA)	Scic	s.t.
8	Felice Gimondi (ITA)	Bianchi–Campagnolo	s.t.
9	Fausto Bertoglio (ITA)	Jollj Ceramica	s.t.
10	Costantino Conti (ITA)	Furzi	s.t.

== Stage 7a ==
23 May 1975 — Castrovillari to Padula, 123 km (76 mi)

Stage 7a result

Rank	Rider	Team	Time
1	Domingo Perurena (ESP)	Kas–Kaskol	3h 15' 17"
2	Alfredo Chinetti (ITA)	Furzi	s.t.
3	Giancarlo Bellini (ITA)	Brooklyn	s.t.
4	Fausto Bertoglio (ITA)	Jollj Ceramica	s.t.
5	Walter Riccomi (ITA)	Scic	s.t.
6	Marcello Osler (ITA)	Brooklyn	+ 31"
7	Roger De Vlaeminck (BEL)	Brooklyn	s.t.
8	Giancarlo Polidori (ITA)	Furzi	s.t.
9	Marino Basso (ITA)	Magniflex	s.t.
10	Patrick Sercu (BEL)	Brooklyn	s.t.

General classification after Stage 7a

Rank	Rider	Team	Time
1	Francisco Galdós (ESP)	Kas–Kaskol	

== Stage 7b ==
23 May 1975 — Padula to Potenza, 80 km (50 mi)

Stage 7b result

Rank	Rider	Team	Time
1	Roger De Vlaeminck (BEL)	Brooklyn	2h 14' 26"
2	Rik Van Linden (BEL)	Bianchi–Campagnolo	s.t.
3	Marcello Bergamo (ITA)	Jollj Ceramica	s.t.
4	Franco Bitossi (ITA)	Scic	s.t.
5	Enrico Paolini (ITA)	Scic	s.t.
6	Luciano Borgognoni (ITA)	Zonca–Santini	s.t.
7	Alfredo Chinetti (ITA)	Furzi	s.t.
8	Adriano Pella (ITA)	Zonca–Santini	s.t.
9	Simone Fraccaro (ITA)	Bianchi–Campagnolo	s.t.
10	Fabrizio Fabbri (ITA)	Bianchi–Campagnolo	s.t.

General classification after Stage 7b

Rank	Rider	Team	Time
1	Francisco Galdós (ESP)	Kas–Kaskol	44h 38' 59"
2	Giovanni Battaglin (ITA)	Jollj Ceramica	+ 23"
3	Fausto Bertoglio (ITA)	Jollj Ceramica	+ 1' 22"
4	Miguel María Lasa (ESP)	Kas–Kaskol	+ 1' 32"
5	Marcello Bergamo (ITA)	Jollj Ceramica	+ 1' 53"
6	Fabrizio Fabbri (ITA)	Bianchi–Campagnolo	s.t.
7	Gianbattista Baronchelli (ITA)	Scic	+ 1' 55"
8	Costantino Conti (ITA)	Furzi	s.t.
9	Felice Gimondi (ITA)	Bianchi–Campagnolo	s.t.
10	Franco Bitossi (ITA)	Scic	s.t.

== Stage 8 ==
24 May 1975 — Potenza to Sorrento, 220 km (140 mi)

Stage 8 result

Rank	Rider	Team	Time
1	Marcello Osler (ITA)	Brooklyn	6h 38' 35"
2	Giovanni Battaglin (ITA)	Jollj Ceramica	+ 8' 48"
3	Costantino Conti (ITA)	Furzi	s.t.
4	Fausto Bertoglio (ITA)	Jollj Ceramica	s.t.
5	Francisco Galdós (ESP)	Kas–Kaskol	s.t.
6	Giuseppe Perletto (ITA)	Magniflex	+ 9' 52"
7	Roger De Vlaeminck (BEL)	Brooklyn	+ 10' 23"
8	Felice Gimondi (ITA)	Bianchi–Campagnolo	s.t.
9	Marcello Bergamo (ITA)	Jollj Ceramica	s.t.
10	Gianbattista Baronchelli (ITA)	Scic	s.t.

General classification after Stage 8

Rank	Rider	Team	Time
1	Francisco Galdós (ESP)	Kas–Kaskol	48h 21' 22"
2	Giovanni Battaglin (ITA)	Jollj Ceramica	+ 23"
3	Fausto Bertoglio (ITA)	Jollj Ceramica	+ 1' 24"
4	Costantino Conti (ITA)	Furzi	+ 1' 55"
5	Miguel María Lasa (ESP)	Kas–Kaskol	+ 3' 07"
6	Giuseppe Perletto (ITA)	Magniflex	+ 3' 11"
7	Marcello Bergamo (ITA)	Jollj Ceramica	+ 3' 28"
8	Fabrizio Fabbri (ITA)	Bianchi–Campagnolo	s.t.
9	Gianbattista Baronchelli (ITA)	Scic	+ 3' 30"
10	Felice Gimondi (ITA)	Bianchi–Campagnolo	s.t.

== Stage 9 ==
25 May 1975 — Sorrento to Frosinone, 222 km (138 mi)

Stage 9 result

Rank	Rider	Team	Time
1	Enrico Paolini (ITA)	Scic	6h 49' 25"
2	Roger De Vlaeminck (BEL)	Brooklyn	s.t.
3	Javier Elorriaga (ESP)	Kas–Kaskol	s.t.
4	Patrick Sercu (BEL)	Brooklyn	+ 7"
5	Pierino Gavazzi (ITA)	Jollj Ceramica	s.t.
6	Luciano Borgognoni (ITA)	Zonca–Santini	s.t.
7	Louis Pfenninger (SUI)	Zonca–Santini	s.t.
8	Marcello Bergamo (ITA)	Jollj Ceramica	s.t.
9	Alfredo Chinetti (ITA)	Furzi	s.t.
10	Giacomo Bazzan (ITA)	Jollj Ceramica	s.t.

General classification after Stage 9

Rank	Rider	Team	Time
1	Francisco Galdós (ESP)	Kas–Kaskol	55h 10' 54"
2	Giovanni Battaglin (ITA)	Jollj Ceramica	+ 23"
3	Fausto Bertoglio (ITA)	Jollj Ceramica	+ 1' 24"
4	Costantino Conti (ITA)	Furzi	+ 1' 55"
5	Miguel María Lasa (ESP)	Kas–Kaskol	+ 3' 07"
6	Giuseppe Perletto (ITA)	Magniflex	+ 3' 11"
7	Marcello Bergamo (ITA)	Jollj Ceramica	+ 3' 28"
8	Fabrizio Fabbri (ITA)	Bianchi–Campagnolo	s.t.
9	Gianbattista Baronchelli (ITA)	Scic	+ 3' 30"
10	Felice Gimondi (ITA)	Bianchi–Campagnolo	s.t.

== Stage 10 ==
26 May 1975 — Frosinone to Tivoli, 176 km (109 mi)

Stage 10 result

Rank	Rider	Team	Time
1	Roger De Vlaeminck (BEL)	Brooklyn	4h 48' 34"
2	Luciano Borgognoni (ITA)	Zonca–Santini	s.t.
3	Felice Gimondi (ITA)	Bianchi–Campagnolo	s.t.
4	Miguel María Lasa (ESP)	Kas–Kaskol	s.t.
5	Giovanni Battaglin (ITA)	Jollj Ceramica	s.t.
6	Costantino Conti (ITA)	Furzi	s.t.
7	Ottavio Crepaldi (ITA)	Magniflex	s.t.
8	Fausto Bertoglio (ITA)	Jollj Ceramica	s.t.
9	Roland Salm (SUI)	Zonca–Santini	s.t.
10	Wladimiro Panizza (ITA)	Brooklyn	s.t.

General classification after Stage 10

Rank	Rider	Team	Time
1	Francisco Galdós (ESP)	Kas–Kaskol	59h 59' 28"
2	Giovanni Battaglin (ITA)	Jollj Ceramica	+ 23"
3	Fausto Bertoglio (ITA)	Jollj Ceramica	+ 1' 24"
4	Costantino Conti (ITA)	Furzi	+ 1' 55"
5	Miguel María Lasa (ESP)	Kas–Kaskol	+ 3' 07"
6	Gianbattista Baronchelli (ITA)	Scic	+ 3' 30"
7	Felice Gimondi (ITA)	Bianchi–Campagnolo	s.t.
8	Walter Riccomi (ITA)	Scic	+ 3' 47"
9	Giuseppe Perletto (ITA)	Magniflex	+ 3' 49"
10	Wladimiro Panizza (ITA)	Brooklyn	+ 3' 52"

== Stage 11 ==
27 May 1975 — Rome to Orvieto, 158 km (98 mi)

Stage 11 result

Rank	Rider	Team	Time
1	Roger De Vlaeminck (BEL)	Brooklyn	3h 55' 07"
2	Miguel María Lasa (ESP)	Kas–Kaskol	+ 3"
3	Luciano Borgognoni (ITA)	Zonca–Santini	s.t.
4	Felice Gimondi (ITA)	Bianchi–Campagnolo	s.t.
5	Rik Van Linden (BEL)	Bianchi–Campagnolo	s.t.
6	Wilmo Francioni (ITA)	Magniflex	s.t.
7	Giovanni Battaglin (ITA)	Jollj Ceramica	s.t.
8	Fausto Bertoglio (ITA)	Jollj Ceramica	s.t.
9	Gianbattista Baronchelli (ITA)	Scic	s.t.
10	Louis Pfenninger (SUI)	Zonca–Santini	s.t.

General classification after Stage 11

Rank	Rider	Team	Time
1	Francisco Galdós (ESP)	Kas–Kaskol	63h 54' 38"
2	Giovanni Battaglin (ITA)	Jollj Ceramica	+ 23"
3	Fausto Bertoglio (ITA)	Jollj Ceramica	+ 1' 24"
4	Costantino Conti (ITA)	Furzi	+ 1' 55"
5	Miguel María Lasa (ESP)	Kas–Kaskol	+ 3' 07"
6	Felice Gimondi (ITA)	Bianchi–Campagnolo	+ 3' 30"
7	Gianbattista Baronchelli (ITA)	Scic	s.t.
8	Walter Riccomi (ITA)	Scic	+ 3' 47"
9	Giuseppe Perletto (ITA)	Magniflex	+ 3' 49"
10	Wladimiro Panizza (ITA)	Brooklyn	+ 3' 52"
