= 1971 UCI Track Cycling World Championships =

- Venue: Varese, Italy
- Date: 1971
- Velodrome: Luigi Ganna Velodrome
- Events: 11

The 1971 UCI Track Cycling World Championships were the World Championship for track cycling. They took place in Varese, Italy in 1971. Eleven events were contested, 9 for men (3 for professionals, 6 for amateurs) and 2 for women.

== Medal summary ==
| Event | Gold | Silver | Bronze |
|---|---|---|---|
Men's Professional Events
| Men's sprint | Leijn Loevesijn; Netherlands | Robert Van Lancker; Belgium | Giordano Turrini; Italy |
| Men's individual pursuit | Dirk Baert; Belgium | Charly Grosskost; France | Hugh Porter; Great Britain |
| Men's motor-paced | Theo Verschueren; Belgium | Jacob Oudkerk; Netherlands | Domenico de Lillo; Italy |
Men's Amateur Events
| Men's 1 km time trial | Eduard Rapp; Soviet Union | Peder Pedersen; Denmark | Pierre Trentin; France |
| Men's sprint | Daniel Morelon; France | Sergeï Kravtsov; Soviet Union | Ivan Kučírek; Czechoslovakia |
| Men's individual pursuit | Martín Emilio Rodríguez; Colombia | Josef Fuchs; Switzerland | Giacomo Bazzan; Italy |
| Men's team pursuit | Italy; Pietro Algeri; Giacomo Bazzan; Giorgio Morbiato; Luciano Borgognoni | East Germany; Thomas Huschke; Heinz Richter; Herbert Richter; Uwe Unterwalder | West Germany; Günter Haritz; Udo Hempel; Peter Vonhof; Jürgen Colombo |
| Men's motor-paced | Horst Gnas; West Germany | Rainer Podlesch; West Germany | Gaby Minneboo; Netherlands |
| Men's tandem | East Germany; Hans-Jürgen Geschke; Werner Otto | West Germany; Jürgen Barth; Rainer Muller | France; Pierre Trentin; Daniel Morelon |
Women's Events
| Women's sprint | Galina Tsareva; Soviet Union | Galina Ermolaeva; Soviet Union | Iva Zajíčková; Czechoslovakia |
| Women's individual pursuit | Tamara Garkuchina; Soviet Union | Keetie Hage; Netherlands | Iva Zajíčková; Czechoslovakia |

== Medal table ==
| Rank | Nation | Gold | Silver | Bronze | Total |
|---|---|---|---|---|---|
| 1 | Soviet Union (URS) | 3 | 2 | 0 | 5 |
| 2 | Belgium (BEL) | 2 | 1 | 0 | 3 |
| 3 | Netherlands (NED) | 1 | 2 | 1 | 4 |
| 3 | West Germany (FRG) | 1 | 2 | 1 | 4 |
| 5 | France (FRA) | 1 | 1 | 2 | 4 |
| 6 | East Germany (GDR) | 1 | 1 | 0 | 2 |
| 7 | Italy (ITA) | 1 | 0 | 3 | 4 |
| 8 | Colombia (COL) | 1 | 0 | 0 | 1 |
| 9 | Denmark (DEN) | 0 | 1 | 0 | 1 |
| 9 | Switzerland (SUI) | 0 | 1 | 0 | 1 |
| 11 | Czechoslovakia (TCH) | 0 | 0 | 3 | 3 |
| 12 | Great Britain (GBR) | 0 | 0 | 1 | 1 |
| Totals (12 entries) | | 11 | 11 | 11 | 33 |

== See also ==
- 1971 UCI Road World Championships
