= Cycling at the 1972 Summer Olympics =

Cycling at the Games of the XX Olympiad
- Cycling pictogram
- Venues: Grünwald; Bundesautobahn 96; Radstadion
- Date: 29 August – 4 September 1972
- Competitors: 359 from 54 nations

The cycling competition at the 1972 Summer Olympics in Munich consisted of two road cycling events and five track cycling events, all for men only.

== Medal summary ==
=== Road cycling ===
Event	Gold	Silver	Bronze
Individual road race	Hennie Kuiper; Netherlands	Clyde Sefton; Australia	no medal awarded
Team time trial	Soviet Union; Valery Yardy; Gennady Komnatov; Valery Likhachov; Boris Shukov	Poland; Ryszard Szurkowski; Edward Barcik; Lucjan Lis; Stanisław Szozda	no medal awarded

=== Track cycling ===
Games	Gold	Silver	Bronze
Individual pursuit	Knut Knudsen; Norway	Xaver Kurmann; Switzerland	Hans Lutz; West Germany
Team pursuit	West Germany; Günther Schumacher; Jürgen Colombo; Günter Haritz; Udo Hempel	East Germany; Uwe Unterwalder; Thomas Huschke; Heinz Richter; Herbert Richter	Great Britain; William Moore; Michael Bennett; Ian Hallam; Ronald Keeble
Sprint	Daniel Morelon; France	John Nicholson; Australia	Omar Pkhakadze; Soviet Union
Tandem	Vladimir Semenets and Igor Tselovalnykov; Soviet Union	Jürgen Geschke and Werner Otto; East Germany	Andrzej Bek and Benedykt Kocot; Poland
Time trial	Niels Fredborg; Denmark	Danny Clark; Australia	Jürgen Schütze; East Germany

== Participating nations ==
359 cyclists from 54 nations competed.

- Argentina (8)
- Australia (10)
- Austria (5)
- Bahamas (2)
- Barbados (3)
- Belgium (14)
- Brazil (2)
- Bulgaria (4)
- Cameroon (4)
- Canada (9)
- Chinese Taipei (1)
- Colombia (10)
- Cuba (6)
- Czechoslovakia (15)

- Denmark (13)
- East Germany (11)
- Ethiopia (5)
- Finland (6)
- France (15)
- Great Britain (11)
- Guyana (1)
- Hungary (4)
- Iran (4)
- Ireland (4)
- Italy (15)
- Jamaica (6)
- Japan (3)

- Lebanon (1)
- Liechtenstein (1)
- Luxembourg (2)
- Malta (4)
- Malawi (2)
- Malaysia (4)
- Mexico (6)
- Netherlands (11)
- New Zealand (8)
- Norway (7)
- Peru (5)
- Philippines (1)
- Poland (12)
- Romania (1)

- San Marino (1)
- Soviet Union (15)
- Spain (8)
- Sweden (5)
- Switzerland (10)
- Thailand (7)
- Togo (3)
- Trinidad and Tobago (6)
- Turkey (6)
- United States (15)
- Uruguay (5)
- West Germany (17)
- Yugoslavia (5)

== Medal table ==
Rank	Nation	Gold	Silver	Bronze	Total
1	Soviet Union	2	0	1	3
2	West Germany	1	0	1	2
3	Denmark	1	0	0	1
3	France	1	0	0	1
3	Netherlands	1	0	0	1
3	Norway	1	0	0	1
7	Australia	0	3	0	3
8	East Germany	0	2	1	3
9	Poland	0	1	1	2
10	Switzerland	0	1	0	1
11	Great Britain	0	0	1	1
Totals (11 entries)		7	7	5	19
