= Cycling at the 1972 Summer Olympics – Men's team pursuit =

Men's cycling team pursuit at the Games of the XX Olympiad
- Venue: Munich, West Germany
- Date: 2–4 September 1972
- Competitors: 90 from 22 nations

Medalists
1st place, gold medalist(s)		Jürgen Colombo, Günter Haritz, Udo Hempel, Günther Schumacher, Peter Vonhof	West Germany
2nd place, silver medalist(s)		Thomas Huschke, Heinz Richter, Herbert Richter, Uwe Unterwalder	East Germany
3rd place, bronze medalist(s)		Michael Bennett, Ian Hallam, Ronald Keeble, William Moore	Great Britain

These are the official results of the men's team pursuit at the 1972 Summer Olympics in Munich, West Germany, held from 2 to 4 September 1972. There were 90 participants from 22 nations.

== Competition format ==
The team pursuit competition consisted of a qualifying round and a 3-round knockout tournament, including a bronze medal race. Each race, in both the qualifying round and the knock-out rounds, consisted of two teams of 4 cyclists each starting from opposite sides of the track. The teams raced for 4,000 metres, attempting to finish with the fastest time (measured by the third rider) and, if possible, catch the other team. For the qualifying round, the eight fastest times overall (regardless of whether the team finished first or second in its heat, though any team that was overtaken was eliminated) earned advancement to the knockout rounds. In the knockout rounds, the winner of each heat advanced to the next round. Teams could change members between rounds.

== Results ==
=== Qualifying round ===
Rank	Cyclists	Nation	Time	Notes
1	Jürgen Colombo; Günter Haritz; Udo Hempel; Günther Schumacher	West Germany	4:23.54	Q
2	Thomas Huschke; Heinz Richter; Herbert Richter; Uwe Unterwalder	East Germany	4:25.48	Q
3	Viktor Bykov; Vladimir Kuznetsov; Anatoly Stepanenko; Aleksandr Yudin	Soviet Union	4:26.53	Q
4	Ad Dekkers; Gerard Kamper; Herman Ponsteen; Roy Schuiten	Netherlands	4:27.30	Q
5	Michael Bennett; Ian Hallam; Ronald Keeble; William Moore	Great Britain	4:28.92	Q
6	Paweł Kaczorowski; Janusz Kierzkowski; Mieczysław Nowicki; Jerzy Głowacki	Poland	4:29.00	Q
7	Martin Steger; Xaver Kurmann; René Savary; Christian Brunner	Switzerland	4:30.56	Q
8	Nikifor Petrov Minchev; Plamen Timchev; Dimo Angelov Tonchev; Ivan Tsvetkov	Bulgaria	4:31.43	Q
9	Pietro Algeri; Giacomo Bazzan; Giorgio Morbiato; Luciano Borgognoni	Italy	4:31.64	
10	Steele Bishop; Danny Clark; Remo Sansonetti; Philip Sawyer	Australia	4:31.85	
11	Zdeněk Dohnal; Jiří Mikšík; Anton Tkáč; Milan Zyka	Czechoslovakia	4:33.39	
12	Leon Daelemans; Roger De Beukelaer; Alex Van Linden; Wilfried Wesemael	Belgium	4:34.26	
13	Gunnar Asmussen; Svend Erik Bjerg; Reno Olsen; Bent Pedersen	Denmark	4:34.78	
14	Paul Brydon; Neil Lyster; John Dean; Blair Stockwell	New Zealand	4:35.11	
15	Bernard Bocquet; Jacques Bossis; Michel Zucarelli; Jean-Jacques Fussien	France	4:35.48	
16	Carlos Miguel Álvarez; Raúl Gómez; Raúl Halket; Ismael Torres	Argentina	4:37.89	
17	David Chauner; John Vande Velde; David Mulica; Jim Ochowicz	United States	4:38.19	
18	Gregorio Aldo Arencibia; Roberto Heredero; Roberto Menéndez; Raúl Marcelo Vázquez	Cuba	4:44.43	
19	Jocelyn Lovell; Brian Keast; Ron Hayman; Ed McRae	Canada	4:48.90	
20	Pat Gellineau; Clive Saney; Anthony Sellier; Vernon Stauble	Trinidad and Tobago	4:56.59	
21	Radcliffe Lawrence; Howard Fenton; Maurice Hugh-Sam; Michael Lecky	Jamaica	4:59.28	
22	Khosro Haghgosha; Mohamed Khodavand; Gholam Hossein Koohi; Behrouz Rahbar	Iran	5:10.80	

=== Quarterfinals ===
==== Quarterfinal 1 ====
Rank	Cyclists	Nation	Time	Notes
1	Michael Bennett; Ian Hallam; Ronald Keeble; William Moore	Great Britain	4:25.23	Q
2	Ad Dekkers; Gerard Kamper; Herman Ponsteen; Roy Schuiten	Netherlands	4:26.11	

==== Quarterfinal 2 ====
Rank	Cyclists	Nation	Time	Notes
1	Bernard Kręczyński; Paweł Kaczorowski; Janusz Kierzkowski; Mieczysław Nowicki	Poland	4:25.72	Q
2	Viktor Bykov; Vladimir Kuznetsov; Anatoly Stepanenko; Aleksandr Yudin	Soviet Union	4:26.75	

==== Quarterfinal 3 ====
Rank	Cyclists	Nation	Time	Notes
1	Thomas Huschke; Heinz Richter; Herbert Richter; Uwe Unterwalder	East Germany	4:23.26	Q
2	Martin Steger; Xaver Kurmann; René Savary; Christian Brunner	Switzerland	4:26.44	

==== Quarterfinal 4 ====
Rank	Cyclists	Nation	Time	Notes
1	Jürgen Colombo; Günter Haritz; Udo Hempel; Günther Schumacher	West Germany	4:24.49	Q
2	Nikifor Petrov Minchev; Plamen Timchev; Dimo Angelov Tonchev; Ivan Tsvetkov	Bulgaria	4:31.55	

=== Semifinals ===
==== Semifinal 1 ====
Rank	Cyclists	Nation	Time	Notes
1	Jürgen Colombo; Günter Haritz; Günther Schumacher; Peter Vonhof	West Germany	–	Q
2	Michael Bennett; Ian Hallam; Ronald Keeble; William Moore	Great Britain	Overtaken	B

==== Semifinal 2 ====
Rank	Cyclists	Nation	Time	Notes
1	Thomas Huschke; Heinz Richter; Herbert Richter; Uwe Unterwalder	East Germany	4:23.14	Q
2	Bernard Kręczyński; Paweł Kaczorowski; Janusz Kierzkowski; Mieczysław Nowicki	Poland	4:26.39	B

=== Finals ===
==== Bronze medal match ====
Rank	Cyclists	Nation	Time
3rd place, bronze medalist(s)	Michael Bennett; Ian Hallam; Ronald Keeble; William Moore	Great Britain	4:23.78
4	Bernard Kręczyński; Paweł Kaczorowski; Janusz Kierzkowski; Mieczysław Nowicki	Poland	4:26.06

==== Final ====
Rank	Cyclists	Nation	Time
1st place, gold medalist(s)	Jürgen Colombo; Günter Haritz; Udo Hempel; Günther Schumacher	West Germany	4:22.14
2nd place, silver medalist(s)	Thomas Huschke; Heinz Richter; Herbert Richter; Uwe Unterwalder	East Germany	4:25.25

== Final classification ==
Rank	Name	Nationality
1st place, gold medalist(s)	Jürgen Colombo; Günter Haritz; Udo Hempel; Günther Schumacher; Peter Vonhof	West Germany
2nd place, silver medalist(s)	Thomas Huschke; Heinz Richter; Herbert Richter; Uwe Unterwalder	East Germany
3rd place, bronze medalist(s)	Michael Bennett; Ian Hallam; Ronald Keeble; William Moore	Great Britain
4	Bernard Kręczyński; Paweł Kaczorowski; Janusz Kierzkowski; Mieczysław Nowicki; Jerzy Głowacki	Poland
5	Nikifor Petrov Minchev; Plamen Timchev; Dimo Angelov Tonchev; Ivan Tsvetkov	Bulgaria
5	Ad Dekkers; Gerard Kamper; Herman Ponsteen; Roy Schuiten	Netherlands
5	Viktor Bykov; Vladimir Kuznetsov; Anatoly Stepanenko; Aleksandr Yudin	Soviet Union
5	Martin Steger; Xaver Kurmann; René Savary; Christian Brunner	Switzerland
9	Pietro Algeri; Giacomo Bazzan; Giorgio Morbiato; Luciano Borgognoni	Italy
10	Steele Bishop; Danny Clark; Remo Sansonetti; Philip Sawyer	Australia
11	Zdeněk Dohnal; Jiří Mikšík; Anton Tkáč; Milan Zyka	Czechoslovakia
12	Leon Daelemans; Roger De Beukelaer; Alex Van Linden; Wilfried Wesemael	Belgium
13	Gunnar Asmussen; Svend Erik Bjerg; Reno Olsen; Bent Pedersen	Denmark
14	Paul Brydon; Neil Lyster; John Dean; Blair Stockwell	New Zealand
15	Bernard Bocquet; Jacques Bossis; Michel Zucarelli; Jean-Jacques Fussien	France
16	Carlos Miguel Álvarez; Raúl Gómez; Raúl Halket; Ismael Torres	Argentina
17	David Chauner; John Vande Velde; David Mulica; Jim Ochowicz	United States
18	Gregorio Aldo Arencibia; Roberto Heredero; Roberto Menéndez; Raúl Marcelo Vázquez	Cuba
19	Jocelyn Lovell; Brian Keast; Ron Hayman; Ed McRae	Canada
20	Pat Gellineau; Clive Saney; Anthony Sellier; Vernon Stauble	Trinidad and Tobago
21	Radcliffe Lawrence; Howard Fenton; Maurice Hugh-Sam; Michael Lecky	Jamaica
22	Khosro Haghgosha; Mohamed Khodavand; Gholam Hossein Koohi; Behrouz Rahbar	Iran
