= Kurmann =

Kurmann is a Swiss surname that may refer to

- Anita Kurmann (1976–2015), Swiss endocrinologist and thyroid surgeon
- Danny Kurmann (born 1966), Swiss ice hockey referee
- Fridolin Kurmann (born 1912), Swiss field hockey player
- Xaver Kurmann (born 1948), Swiss cyclist
