= Cycling at the 1968 Summer Olympics – Men's individual pursuit =

Men's cycling individual pursuit at the Games of the XIX Olympiad
- Venue: Olympic Velodrome, Mexico City
- Date: 17 to 18 October 1968
- Competitors: 28 from 28 nations

Medalists
1st place, gold medalist(s)		Daniel Rébillard	France
2nd place, silver medalist(s)		Mogens Frey	Denmark
3rd place, bronze medalist(s)		Xaver Kurmann	Switzerland

These are the official results of the men's individual pursuit at the 1968 Summer Olympics in Mexico City, Mexico, held on 17 and 18 October 1968. There were 28 participants from 28 nations.

== Competition format ==
The individual pursuit competition consisted of a qualifying round and a 3-round knockout tournament, including a bronze medal race. Each race, in both the qualifying round and the knock-out rounds, consisted of a pair of cyclists starting from opposite sides of the track. The cyclists raced for 4,000 metres, attempting to finish with the fastest time and, if possible, catch the other cyclist. For the qualifying round, the eight fastest times overall (regardless of whether the cyclist finished first or second in his heat, though any cyclist who was overtaken was eliminated) earned advancement to the knockout rounds. In the knockout rounds, the winner of each heat advanced to the next round.

== Results ==
=== Qualifying round ===
Rank	Cyclist	Nation	Time	Notes
1	Xaver Kurmann	Switzerland	4:40.41	Q
2	John Bylsma	Australia	4:41.10	Q
3	Daniel Rébillard	France	4:42.15	Q
4	Mogens Frey	Denmark	4:42.30	Q
5	Cipriano Chemello	Italy	4:43.58	Q
6	Rupert Kratzer	West Germany	4:43.84	Q
7	Radamés Treviño	Mexico	4:44.12	Q
8	Paul Crapez	Belgium	4:44.93	Q
9	Martín Emilio Rodríguez	Colombia	4:45.38	
10	Rajmund Zieliński	Poland	4:46.03	
11	Knut Knudsen	Norway	4:46.70	
12	Juan Alberto Merlos	Argentina	4:47.81	
13	Daniel Yuste	Spain	4:50.36	
14	Jiří Daler	Czechoslovakia	4:50.50	
15	Ian Hallam	Great Britain	4:50.62	
16	Ole Wackström	Finland	4:50.76	
17	Gösta Pettersson	Sweden	4:51.37	
18	David Brink	United States	4:55.40	
19	Vernon Stauble	Trinidad and Tobago	5:07.80	
20	Benjamin Evangelista	Philippines	5:22.12	
21	Tarek Abou Al Dahab	Lebanon	5:35.42	
22	Colin Forde	Barbados	5:35.60	
–	Inocente Lizano	Cuba	4:51.09	Overtaken
–	Fedor den Hertog	Netherlands	4:54.32	Overtaken
–	Emil Rusu	Romania	4:56.45	Overtaken
–	Gwon Jung-hyeon	South Korea	5:09.90	Overtaken
–	Pakanit Boriharnvanakhet	Thailand	5:34.50	Overtaken
–	Denfield McNab	British Honduras	6:12.96	Overtaken

=== Quarterfinals ===
==== Quarterfinal 1 ====
Rank	Cyclist	Nation	Time	Notes
1	Xaver Kurmann	Switzerland	4:45.94	Q
2	Paul Crapez	Belgium	4:49.99	

==== Quarterfinal 2 ====
Rank	Cyclist	Nation	Time	Notes
1	John Bylsma	Australia	4:41.66	Q
2	Radamés Treviño	Mexico	4:42.40	

==== Quarterfinal 3 ====
Rank	Cyclist	Nation	Time	Notes
1	Daniel Rébillard	France	4:39.87	Q
2	Rupert Kratzer	West Germany	4:41.43	

==== Quarterfinal 4 ====
Rank	Cyclist	Nation	Time	Notes
1	Mogens Frey	Denmark	4:37.54	Q
2	Cipriano Chemello	Italy	4:42.29	

=== Semifinals ===
==== Semifinal 1 ====
Rank	Cyclist	Nation	Time	Notes
1	Mogens Frey	Denmark	4:42.05	Q
2	Xaver Kurmann	Switzerland	4:44.26	B

==== Semifinal 2 ====
Rank	Cyclist	Nation	Time	Notes
1	Daniel Rébillard	France	4:41.80	Q
2	John Bylsma	Australia	4:48.73	B

=== Finals ===
==== Bronze medal match ====
Rank	Cyclist	Nation	Time
3rd place, bronze medalist(s)	Xaver Kurmann	Switzerland	4:39.42
4	John Bylsma	Australia	4:41.60

==== Final ====
Rank	Cyclist	Nation	Time
1st place, gold medalist(s)	Daniel Rébillard	France	4:41.71
2nd place, silver medalist(s)	Mogens Frey	Denmark	4:42.43

== Final classification ==
Rank	Name	Nation
1st place, gold medalist(s)	Daniel Rébillard	France
2nd place, silver medalist(s)	Mogens Frey	Denmark
3rd place, bronze medalist(s)	Xaver Kurmann	Switzerland
4	John Bylsma	Australia
5	Cipriano Chemello	Italy
5	Paul Crapez	Belgium
5	Rupert Kratzer	West Germany
5	Radamés Treviño	Mexico
9	Martín Rodríguez	Colombia
10	Rajmund Zieliński	Poland
11	Knut Knudsen	Norway
12	Juan Alberto Merlos	Argentina
13	Daniel Yuste	Spain
14	Jiří Daler	Czechoslovakia
15	Ian Hallam	Great Britain
16	Ole Wackström	Finland
17	Gösta Pettersson	Sweden
18	David Brink	United States
19	Vernon Stauble	Trinidad and Tobago
20	Benjamin Evangelista	Philippines
21	Tarek Abou Al Dahab	Lebanon
22	Colin Forde	Barbados
AC	Inocente Lizano	Cuba
AC	Fedor den Hertog	Netherlands
AC	Emil Rusu	Romania
AC	Gwon Jung-hyeon	South Korea
AC	Pakanit Boriharnvanakhet	Thailand
AC	Denfield McNab	British Honduras
