= Cycling at the 1972 Summer Olympics – Men's individual pursuit =

Men's cycling individual pursuit at the Games of the XX Olympiad
- Venue: Munich, West Germany
- Date: 31 August to 1 September 1972
- Competitors: 28 from 28 nations

Medalists
1st place, gold medalist(s)		Knut Knudsen	Norway
2nd place, silver medalist(s)		Xaver Kurmann	Switzerland
3rd place, bronze medalist(s)		Hans Lutz	West Germany

These are the official results of the Men's individual pursuit at the 1972 Summer Olympics in Munich, West Germany, held on 31 August and 1 September 1972. There were 28 participants from 28 nations.

== Competition format ==
The individual pursuit competition consisted of a qualifying round and a 3-round knockout tournament, including a bronze medal race. Each race, in both the qualifying round and the knock-out rounds, consisted of a pair of cyclists starting from opposite sides of the track. The cyclists raced for 4,000 metres, attempting to finish with the fastest time and, if possible, catch the other cyclist. For the qualifying round, the eight fastest times overall (regardless of whether the cyclist finished first or second in his heat, though any cyclist who was overtaken was eliminated) earned advancement to the knockout rounds. In the knockout rounds, the winner of each heat advanced to the next round.

== Results ==
=== Qualifying round ===
Rank	Cyclist	Nation	Time	Notes
1	Knut Knudsen	Norway	4:49.06	Q
2	John Bylsma	Australia	4:50.06	Q
3	Hans Lutz	West Germany	4:51.33	Q
4	Luciano Borgognoni	Italy	4:52.37	Q
5	Xaver Kurmann	Switzerland	4:54.50	Q
6	Carlos Miguel Álvarez	Argentina	4:55.46	Q
7	Roy Schuiten	Netherlands	4:56.10	Q
8	Luis Díaz	Colombia	4:56.32	Q
9	Thomas Huschke	East Germany	4:57.95	
10	Ian Hallam	Great Britain	4:59.43	
11	Francisco Huerta	Mexico	5:00.93	
12	John Vande Velde	United States	5:01.75	
13	Reno Olsen	Denmark	5:02.00	
14	Mieczysław Nowicki	Poland	5:02.28	
15	Ivan Tsvetkov	Bulgaria	5:02.39	
16	Milan Puzrla	Czechoslovakia	5:02.55	
17	Miguel Espinós	Spain	5:03.26	
18	Wilfried Wesemael	Belgium	5:04.67	
19	Raimo Suikkanen	Finland	5:06.77	
20	Michel Zucarelli	France	5:07.17	
21	Roberto Heredero	Cuba	5:07.70	
22	Ron Hayman	Canada	5:17.51	
23	Vernon Stauble	Trinidad and Tobago	5:17.87	
24	Orlando Bates	Barbados	5:19.68	
25	Khosro Haghgosha	Iran	5:22.98	
26	Michael Lecky	Jamaica	5:29.90	
27	Tarek Abou Al Dahab	Lebanon	5:41.19	
28	Maximo Junta	Philippines	5:53.19	

=== Quarterfinals ===
==== Quarterfinal 1 ====
Rank	Cyclist	Nation	Time	Notes
1	Xaver Kurmann	Switzerland	4:50.54	Q
2	Luciano Borgognoni	Italy	4:52.31	

==== Quarterfinal 2 ====
Rank	Cyclist	Nation	Time	Notes
1	Hans Lutz	West Germany	4:56.17	Q
2	Carlos Miguel Álvarez	Argentina	4:57.09	

==== Quarterfinal 3 ====
Rank	Cyclist	Nation	Time	Notes
1	John Bylsma	Australia	4:50.47	Q
2	Roy Schuiten	Netherlands	4:52.16	

==== Quarterfinal 4 ====
Rank	Cyclist	Nation	Time	Notes
1	Knut Knudsen	Norway	4:47.43	Q
2	Luis Díaz	Colombia	Overtaken	

=== Semifinals ===
==== Semifinal 1 ====
Rank	Cyclist	Nation	Time	Notes
1	Xaver Kurmann	Switzerland	4:47.04	Q
2	John Bylsma	Australia	4:47.41	B

==== Semifinal 2 ====
Rank	Cyclist	Nation	Time	Notes
1	Knut Knudsen	Norway	4:45.57	Q
2	Hans Lutz	West Germany	Overtaken	B

=== Finals ===
==== Bronze medal match ====
Rank	Cyclist	Nation	Time
3rd place, bronze medalist(s)	Hans Lutz	West Germany	4:50.80
4	John Bylsma	Australia	4:54.93

==== Final ====
Rank	Cyclist	Nation	Time
1st place, gold medalist(s)	Knut Knudsen	Norway	4:45.74
2nd place, silver medalist(s)	Xaver Kurmann	Switzerland	4:51.96

== Final classification ==
Rank	Name	Nationality
1st place, gold medalist(s)	Knut Knudsen	Norway
2nd place, silver medalist(s)	Xaver Kurmann	Switzerland
3rd place, bronze medalist(s)	Hans Lutz	West Germany
4	John Bylsma	Australia
5	Carlos Miguel Álvarez	Argentina
5	Luciano Borgognoni	Italy
5	Luis Díaz	Colombia
5	Roy Schuiten	Netherlands
9	Thomas Huschke	East Germany
10	Ian Hallam	Great Britain
11	Francisco Huerta	Mexico
12	John Vande Velde	United States
13	Reno Olsen	Denmark
14	Mieczysław Nowicki	Poland
15	Ivan Tsvetkov	Bulgaria
16	Milan Puzrla	Czechoslovakia
17	Miguel Espinós	Spain
18	Wilfried Wesemael	Belgium
19	Raimo Suikkanen	Finland
20	Michel Zucarelli	France
21	Roberto Heredero	Cuba
22	Ron Hayman	Canada
23	Vernon Stauble	Trinidad and Tobago
24	Orlando Bates	Barbados
25	Khosro Haghgosha	Iran
26	Michael Lecky	Jamaica
27	Tarek Abou Al Dahab	Lebanon
28	Maximo Junta	Philippines
