= Kratzer =

Kratzer may refer to:

== People ==
- Adolf Kratzer (1893–1983), German theoretical physicist
- Alois Kratzer (1907–1990), German ski jumper
- Angelika Kratzer, German semanticist
- Ashley Kratzer (born 1999), American tennis player
- Dan Kratzer (born 1949), American football player
- Evi Kratzer (born 1961), Swiss cross-country skier
- Guy Kratzer (1941–2013), American politician from Pennsylvania
- Leon Kratzer (born 1997), German basketball player
- Nicholas Kratzer (1487?–1550), German mathematician, astronomer, and horologist
- Rupert Kratzer (1945–2013), German cyclist
- Sophie Kratzer (1989–2020), German ice hockey player
- Tobias Kratzer (born 1980), German stage director

== Other ==
- Kratzer (mountain), Bavaria, Germany
- 14262 Kratzer (2000 AC125), a Main-belt Asteroid
