= Cycling at the 1967 Mediterranean Games =

Cycling competition

- Location: Tunis, Tunisia
- Dates: 8–17 September 1967

The cycling events of the 1967 Mediterranean Games were in Tunis, Tunisia.

== Medalists ==
=== Road cycling ===
Games	Gold	Silver	Bronze
Individual road race	Tino Conti (ITA)	Giannino Bianco (ITA)	Mario Giaccone (ITA)
Team road race	Italy (ITA); Tino Conti	Tunisia (TUN)	Spain (ESP); José Gómez
Team time trial	Italy (ITA); Tino Conti; Vittorio Marcelli; Flavio Martini; Benito Pigato	Spain (ESP); José Gómez del Moral; Nemesio Jiménez; Daniel Yuste	Morocco (MAR)

== Medal table ==
Rank	Nation	Gold	Silver	Bronze	Total
1	Italy (ITA)	3	1	1	5
2	Spain (ESP)	0	1	1	2
3	Tunisia (TUN)	0	1	0	1
4	Morocco (MAR)	0	0	1	1
Totals (4 entries)		3	3	3	9
