= 1976 UCI Road World Championships – Men's road race =

Men's Individual Road Race
1976 UCI Road World Championships
- Rainbow jersey

Race details
- Dates: 5 September 1976
- Stages: 1
- Distance: 288 km (179.0 mi)
- Winning time: 7h 06' 10"

Results
	Winner	Freddy Maertens (BEL)	(Belgium)
	Second	Francesco Moser (ITA)	(Italy)
	Third	Tino Conti (ITA)	(Italy)

The men's road race at the 1976 UCI Road World Championships was the 43rd edition of the event. The race took place on Sunday 5 September 1976 in Ostuni, Italy. The race was won by Freddy Maertens of Belgium.

== Final classification ==
General classification (1–10)

Rank	Rider	Time
1st place, gold medalist(s)	Freddy Maertens (BEL)	7h 06' 10"
2nd place, silver medalist(s)	Francesco Moser (ITA)	+ 0"
3rd place, bronze medalist(s)	Tino Conti (ITA)	+ 11"
4	Joop Zoetemelk (NED)	+ 11"
5	Eddy Merckx (BEL)	+ 26"
6	Bernard Hinault (FRA)	+ 26"
7	Felice Gimondi (ITA)	+ 26"
8	Jan Raas (NED)	+ 26"
9	Donald Allan (AUS)	+ 27"
10	Michael Neel (USA)	+ 27"
