= Ad Dekkers =

Ad Dekkers may refer to:

- Ad Dekkers (painter) (1922–2004), Dutch painter
- Ad Dekkers (artist) (1938–1974), Dutch sculptor
- Ad Dekkers (cyclist) (b. 1953), Dutch cyclist
