= Algeri (surname) =

Algeri is a surname. Notable persons of this name include the following:

- Pietro Algeri (born 1950), Italian cyclist
- Vittorio Algeri (born 1953) Italian cyclist and directeur sportif

Algeri is also the Italian name for Algiers
