= Lizano =

Lizano is a Spanish surname. Notable people with the surname include:

- César Lizano (born 1982), Costa Rican long-distance runner
- Inocente Lizano (born 1940), Cuban cyclist
- Saturnino Lizano Gutiérrez (1826–1905), President of Costa Rica
- Susana Lizano (born 1957), Mexican astrophysicist

== Other uses ==
- Lizano sauce, a Costa Rican condiment originally developed by the Lizano company
