= Ismael Torres =

Argentine cyclist

Personal information
- Born: 27 March 1952
- Died: 21 October 2003 (aged 51)

Cycling career
- Sport: Cycling

Ismael Torres (27 March 1952 – 21 October 2003) was an Argentine cyclist. He competed in the team pursuit event at the 1972 Summer Olympics.
