= Christian Brunner =

Swiss cyclist

Personal information
- Born: 2 April 1953 (age 73)

Cycling career
- Sport: Cycling

Christian Brunner (born 2 April 1953) is a former Swiss cyclist. He competed in the 1000m time trial and team pursuit events at the 1972 Summer Olympics.
