= Bernard Bocquet =

French cyclist

Personal information
- Born: 24 March 1949 Meudon, France
- Died: 19 April 2017 (aged 68)

Cycling career
- Sport: Cycling
- Role: Rider

Bernard Bocquet (24 March 1949 – 19 April 2017) was a French cyclist. He competed in the team pursuit event at the 1972 Summer Olympics.

== Bibliography ==
Jean Le Floch, A saga of champions from Poissy, Revue Chronos n°90, CEHA (Circle for Historical and Archaeological Studies) of Poissy et Carrières-sous-Poissy, Spring 2024.
