= Milan Zyka =

Czech cyclist

Personal information
- Born: 30 August 1947 (age 79) Brno, Czechoslovakia

Cycling career
- Sport: Cycling

Milan Zyka (born 30 August 1947) is a former Czech cyclist. He competed in the team pursuit event at the 1972 Summer Olympics.
