= Ivan Tsvetkov (cyclist) =

Bulgarian cyclist (born 1951)

Personal information
- Born: 13 September 1951 (age 75)

Cycling career
- Sport: Cycling

Ivan Tsvetkov (Bulgarian: Иван Цветков, born 13 September 1951) is a former Bulgarian cyclist. He competed in the individual and team pursuit events at the 1972 Summer Olympics.
