= Martin Steger =

Swiss cyclist

Personal information
- Born: 20 October 1948 (age 77) Oberriet, Switzerland

Cycling career
- Sport: Cycling

Martin Steger (born 20 October 1948) is a former Swiss cyclist. He competed in the team pursuit event at the 1972 Summer Olympics and placed fifth.
