= Nikifor Petrov Minchev =

Bulgarian cyclist

Personal information
- Born: 5 January 1950 (age 76) Gabrovo, Bulgaria

Cycling career
- Sport: Cycling

Nikifor Petrov Minchev (Bulgarian: Никифор Петров Минчев, born 5 January 1950) is a former Bulgarian cyclist. He competed in the team pursuit event at the 1972 Summer Olympics.
