= David Mulica =

American cyclist

Personal information
- Born: March 17, 1949 (age 77) Santa Monica, California, United States

Cycling career
- Sport: Cycling

David Mulica (born March 17, 1949) is a former American cyclist. He competed in the team pursuit event at the 1972 Summer Olympics.
