= Roberto Heredero =

Cuban cyclist

Personal information
- Born: 16 December 1950 (age 75)

Cycling career
- Sport: Cycling

Roberto Heredero (born 16 December 1950) is a former Cuban cyclist. He competed in the individual and team pursuit events at the 1972 Summer Olympics.
