= 1975 Giro d'Italia =

Race details
- Dates: 17 May – 7 June 1975
- Stages: 21, including two split stages
- Distance: 3,963 km (2,462 mi)
- Winning time: 111h 31' 24"

Results
Jersey awarded to the overall winner	Winner	Fausto Bertoglio (ITA)	(Jollj Ceramica)
	Second	Francisco Galdós (ESP)	(KAS)
	Third	Felice Gimondi (ITA)	(Bianchi-Campagnolo)
Jersey awarded to the points classification winner	Points	Roger De Vlaeminck (BEL)	(Brooklyn)
Jersey awarded to the mountains classification winner	Mountains	Two riders (Note: Francisco Galdós & Andrés Oliva, both Spanish riders from the KAS team, finished the race with the same number of points in the mountains classification and were both winners.)	
	Team points	Brooklyn	

The 1975 Giro d'Italia was the 58th running of the Giro, one of cycling's Grand Tours. It started in Milan, on 17 May, with a set of split stages and concluded with a summit finish to the Passo dello Stelvio, on 7 June, with another split stage, consisting of an individual time trial and a mass-start stage. A total of 90 riders from nine teams entered the 22-stage race, that was won by Italian Fausto Bertoglio of the Jollj Ceramica team. The second and third places were taken by Spaniard Francisco Galdós and Italian Felice Gimondi, respectively.

Amongst the other classifications that the race awarded, Brooklyn's Roger De Vlaeminck won the points classification and Andrés Oliva and Francisco Galdós of KAS won the mountains classification. Brooklyn finished as the winners of the team points classification. Roger De Vlaeminck won seven stages.

== Teams ==
Nine teams were invited by the race organizers to participate in the 1975 edition of the Giro d'Italia In total, 58 riders were from Italy, while the remaining 37 riders came from: Belgium (10), Spain (10), the Netherlands (7), Switzerland (2), Colombia (1), New Zealand (1), and Norway (1). Each team sent a squad of ten riders, which meant that the race started with a peloton of 90 cyclists.

Of those starting, 21 were riding the Giro d'Italia for the first time. The average age of riders was 27.2 years, ranging from 21–year–old Gianbattista Baronchelli (Scic) to 34–year–old Franco Bitossi (Scic). The team with the youngest average rider age was Bassi Frisol (24), while the oldest was Bianchi-Campagnolo (28). From those that started, 70 made it to the finish on the Passo dello Stelvio.

The teams entering the race were:

- Bianchi-Campagnolo
- Brooklyn
- Vibor
- Bassi Frisol
- Jollj Ceramica
- KAS
- Magniflex
- Scic
- Zonca

The winner of the previous edition, Eddy Merckx, was planning to defend his title, but fell ill two days before the start. His team Molteni had been fully prepared to help Merckx win his sixth Giro title, but without their leader they decided it was useless to start.

== Route and stages ==
The route for the race was revealed on 10 April 1975.

Stage characteristics and winners
Stage	Date	Course	Distance	Type	Winner
1	17 May	Milan to Fiorano Modenese	177 km (110 mi)	Plain stage	Knut Knudsen (NOR)
2	18 May	Modena to Ancona	249 km (155 mi)	Plain stage	Patrick Sercu (BEL)
3	19 May	Ancona to Prati di Tivo	175 km (109 mi)	Stage with mountain(s)	Giovanni Battaglin (ITA)
4	20 May	Teramo to Campobasso	258 km (160 mi)	Stage with mountain(s)	Roger De Vlaeminck (BEL)
5	21 May	Campobasso to Bari	224 km (139 mi)	Plain stage	Rik Van Linden (BEL)
6	22 May	Bari to Castrovillari	213 km (132 mi)	Plain stage	Roger De Vlaeminck (BEL)
7a	23 May	Castrovillari to Padula	123 km (76 mi)	Stage with mountain(s)	Domingo Perurena (ESP)
7b	23 May	Padula to Potenza	80 km (50 mi)	Stage with mountain(s)	Roger De Vlaeminck (BEL)
8	24 May	Potenza to Sorrento	220 km (137 mi)	Stage with mountain(s)	Marcello Osler (ITA)
9	25 May	Sorrento to Frosinone	222 km (138 mi)	Plain stage	Enrico Paolini (ITA)
10	26 May	Frosinone to Tivoli	176 km (109 mi)	Plain stage	Roger De Vlaeminck (BEL)
11	27 May	Rome to Orvieto	158 km (98 mi)	Plain stage	Roger De Vlaeminck (BEL)
12	28 May	Chianciano Terme to Forte dei Marmi	232 km (144 mi)	Plain stage	Patrick Sercu (BEL)
13	29 May	Forte dei Marmi to Forte dei Marmi	38 km (24 mi)	Individual time trial	Giovanni Battaglin (ITA)
	30 May	Rest day			
14	31 May	Il Ciocco to Il Ciocco	13 km (8 mi)	Individual time trial	Fausto Bertoglio (ITA)
15	1 June	Il Ciocco to Arenzano	203 km (126 mi)	Stage with mountain(s)	Franco Bitossi (ITA)
16	2 June	Arenzano to Orta San Giulio	193 km (120 mi)	Plain stage	Fabrizio Fabbri (ITA)
17a	3 June	Omegna to Pontoglio	167 km (104 mi)	Plain stage	Patrick Sercu (BEL)
17b	3 June	Pontoglio to Monte Maddalena	46 km (29 mi)	Stage with mountain(s)	Wladimiro Panizza (ITA)
18	4 June	Brescia to Baselga di Piné	223 km (139 mi)	Stage with mountain(s)	Roger De Vlaeminck (BEL)
19	5 June	Baselga di Piné to Pordenone	175 km (109 mi)	Plain stage	Martín Emilio Rodríguez (COL)
20	6 June	Pordenone to Alleghe	197 km (122 mi)	Stage with mountain(s)	Roger De Vlaeminck (BEL)
21	7 June	Alleghe to Passo dello Stelvio	186 km (116 mi)	Stage with mountain(s)	Francisco Galdós (ESP)
	Total		3,963 km (2,462 mi)		

== Classification leadership ==
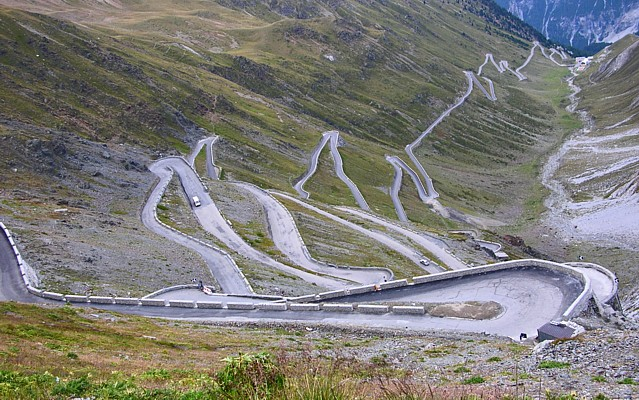
A sample of the 48 hairpin turns near the top of the eastern ramp of the Stelvio Pass, the Cima Coppi (highest elevation point) of the 1975 Giro.

There were three main individual classifications contested in the 1975 Giro d'Italia, as well as a team competition. Three of them awarded jerseys to their leaders. The general classification was the most important and was calculated by adding each rider's finishing times on each stage. The rider with the lowest cumulative time was the winner of the general classification and was considered the overall winner of the Giro. The rider leading the classification wore a pink jersey to signify the classification's leadership.

The second classification was the points classification. Riders received points for finishing in the top positions in a stage finish, with first place getting the most points, and lower placings getting successively fewer points. The rider leading this classification wore a purple (or cyclamen) jersey. The mountains classification was the third classification and its leader was denoted by the green jersey. In this ranking, points were won by reaching the summit of a climb ahead of other cyclists. Each climb was ranked as either first, second or third category, with more points available for higher category climbs. Most stages of the race included one or more categorized climbs, in which points were awarded to the riders that reached the summit first. The Cima Coppi, the race's highest point of elevation, awarded more points than the other first category climbs. The Cima Coppi for this Giro was the Passo dello Stelvio. The first rider to cross the Stelvio was Spanish rider Francisco Galdós.

The team classification awarded no jersey to its leaders. This was calculated by adding together points earned by each rider on the team during each stage through the intermediate sprints, the categorized climbs, stage finishes, etc. The team with the most points led the classification.

There were other minor classifications within the race, including the Campionato delle Regioni classification. This was a replacement for the "traguardi tricolore" classification that was calculated in previous years. The leader wore a blue jersey with colored vertical stripes ("maglia azzurra con banda tricolore verticale"). On every intermediate sprint, the first three riders scored points.

Classification leadership by stage
Stage	Winner	General classification	Points classification	Mountains classification	Campionato delle Regioni	Team classification
1	Knut Knudsen	Knut Knudsen	Knut Knudsen	not awarded	Marcello Osler	not awarded
2	Patrick Sercu	Knut Knudsen	Rik Van Linden	not awarded	Marcello Osler	Jollj Ceramica
3	Giovanni Battaglin	Giovanni Battaglin	Rik Van Linden	Giovanni Battaglin	?	Jollj Ceramica
4	Roger De Vlaeminck	Francisco Galdós	Roger De Vlaeminck & Pierino Gavazzi	Andrés Oliva	?	Brooklyn
5	Rik Van Linden	Francisco Galdós	Rik Van Linden	Andrés Oliva	Marcello Osler	Brooklyn
6	Roger De Vlaeminck	Francisco Galdós	Roger De Vlaeminck	Andrés Oliva	Marcello Osler	Brooklyn
7a	Domingo Perurena	Francisco Galdós	Roger De Vlaeminck	Andrés Oliva	Marcello Osler	Brooklyn
7b	Roger De Vlaeminck	Francisco Galdós	Roger De Vlaeminck	Andrés Oliva	Marcello Osler	Brooklyn
8	Marcello Osler	Francisco Galdós	Roger De Vlaeminck	Andrés Oliva	Marcello Osler	Brooklyn
9	Enrico Paolini	Francisco Galdós	Roger De Vlaeminck	Andrés Oliva	Marcello Osler	Brooklyn
10	Roger De Vlaeminck	Francisco Galdós	Roger De Vlaeminck	Andrés Oliva	Marcello Osler	Brooklyn
11	Roger De Vlaeminck	Francisco Galdós	Roger De Vlaeminck	Andrés Oliva	Marcello Osler	Brooklyn
12	Patrick Sercu	Francisco Galdós	Roger De Vlaeminck	Andrés Oliva	Marcello Osler	Brooklyn
13	Giovanni Battaglin	Giovanni Battaglin	Roger De Vlaeminck	Andrés Oliva	Marcello Osler	Brooklyn
14	Fausto Bertoglio	Fausto Bertoglio	Roger De Vlaeminck	Fausto Bertoglio & Andrés Oliva	Marcello Osler	Brooklyn
15	Franco Bitossi	Fausto Bertoglio	Roger De Vlaeminck	Andrés Oliva	Marcello Osler	Brooklyn
16	Fabrizio Fabbri	Fausto Bertoglio	Roger De Vlaeminck	Andrés Oliva	?	Brooklyn
17a	Patrick Sercu	Fausto Bertoglio	Roger De Vlaeminck	Andrés Oliva	?	Brooklyn
17b	Wladimiro Panizza	Fausto Bertoglio	Roger De Vlaeminck	Fausto Bertoglio	?	Brooklyn
18	Roger De Vlaeminck	Fausto Bertoglio	Roger De Vlaeminck	Andrés Oliva	?	Brooklyn
19	Martín Emilio Rodríguez	Fausto Bertoglio	Roger De Vlaeminck	Andrés Oliva	?	Brooklyn
20	Roger De Vlaeminck	Fausto Bertoglio	Roger De Vlaeminck	Andrés Oliva	Marcello Osler	Brooklyn
21	Francisco Galdós	Fausto Bertoglio	Roger De Vlaeminck	Francisco Galdós & Andrés Oliva	Marcello Osler	Brooklyn
Final		Fausto Bertoglio	Roger De Vlaeminck	Francisco Galdós & Andrés Oliva	Marcello Osler	Brooklyn

== Final standings ==
Legend
Pink jersey	Denotes the winner of the General classification
Purple jersey	Denotes the winner of the Points classification
Green jersey	Denotes the winner of the Mountains classification
Blue jersey	Denotes the winner of the Campionato delle Regioni classification

=== General classification ===
Final general classification (1–10)
Rank	Name	Team	Time
1	Fausto Bertoglio (ITA)	Jollj Ceramica	111h 31' 24"
2	Francisco Galdós (ESP)	KAS	+ 41"
3	Felice Gimondi (ITA)	Bianchi-Campagnolo	+ 6' 18"
4	Roger De Vlaeminck (BEL)	Brooklyn	+ 7' 39"
5	Giuseppe Perletto (ITA)	Magniflex	+ 8' 00"
6	Wladimiro Panizza (ITA)	Brooklyn	+ 8' 13"
7	Walter Riccomi (ITA)	Scic	+ 10' 32"
8	Costantino Conti (ITA)	Furzi	+ 13' 40"
9	Miguel María Lasa (ESP)	KAS	+ 14' 48"
10	Gianbattista Baronchelli (ITA)	Scic	+ 14' 48"

=== Points classification ===
Final points classification (1–5)
	Rider	Team	Points
1	Roger De Vlaeminck (BEL)	Brooklyn	346
2	Fausto Bertoglio (ITA)	Jollj Ceramica	159
3	Felice Gimondi (ITA)	Bianchi-Campagnolo	154
4	Patrick Sercu (BEL)	Brooklyn	148
5	Luciano Borgognoni (ITA)	Zonca	123

=== Mountains classification ===
Final mountains classification (1–10)
	Rider	Team	Points
1	Francisco Galdós (ESP)	KAS	300
1	Andrés Oliva (ESP)	KAS	300
3	Fausto Bertoglio (ITA)	Jollj Ceramica	240
4	Giancarlo Polidori (ITA)	Furzi	150
5	Roger De Vlaeminck (BEL)	Brooklyn	130
6	Giuseppe Perletto (ITA)	Magniflex	120
7	Marcello Osler (ITA)	Brooklyn	110
7	Giacinto Santambrogio (ITA)	Bianchi-Campagnolo	110
7	Wladimiro Panizza (ITA)	Brooklyn	110
10	Giovanni Battaglin (ITA)	Jollj Ceramica	80

=== Campionato delle Regioni classification ===
Final Campionato delle Regioni classification (1–5)
	Rider	Team	Points
1	Marcello Osler (ITA)	Brooklyn	43
2	Giacinto Santambrogio (ITA)	Bianchi-Campagnolo	31
3	Adriano Pella (ITA)	Zonca	25
4	Giancarlo Polidori (ITA)	Furzi	23
5	Patrick Sercu (BEL)	Brooklyn	10

=== Combination classification ===
Final Combination classification (1–5)
	Rider	Team	Points
1	Roger De Vlaeminck (BEL)	Brooklyn	?
2	Fabrizio Fabbri (ITA)	Bianchi-Campagnolo	?
3	Giacinto Santambrogio (ITA)	Bianchi-Campagnolo	?
4	Marcello Osler (ITA)	Brooklyn	?
5	Andrés Oliva (ESP)	KAS	?

=== Team points classification ===
Final team points classification (1–5)
	Team	Points
1	Brooklyn	11,270
2	Jollj Ceramica	6,720
3	KAS	6,200
4	Bianchi-Campagnolo	5,895
5	Scic	3,485

== Doping ==
There was no positive doping test in the Giro of 1975.
