= Luis Díaz (cyclist) =

Colombian cyclist (1945–2021)

Personal information
- Full name: Luis Hernán Díaz Villegas
- Born: 4 November 1945 Buga, Valle del Cauca, Colombia
- Died: 24 November 2021 (aged 76)

Cycling career
- Sport: Cycling

Luis Hernán Díaz Villegas (4 November 1945 – 24 November 2021) was a Colombian cyclist. He reached the quarterfinal in the individual pursuit event at the 1972 Summer Olympics.

Díaz was born in Buga, Valle del Cauca on 4 November 1945. He died from cancer on 24 November 2021, at the age of 76.

== Career ==
1976
1st in Stage 5 Vuelta a Colombia, Tunja (COL)
1st in Stage 12 Vuelta a Colombia, Cali (COL)
1st in Stage 14 Vuelta a Colombia, Medellín (COL)
