= Jerzy Głowacki =

Polish cyclist (1950–2022)

Personal information
- Born: 26 June 1950; Kalisz, Poland
- Died: 11 January 2022 (aged 71); Albuquerque, New Mexico, United States

Jerzy Głowacki (26 June 1950 – 11 January 2022) was a Polish cyclist. He competed in the team pursuit event at the 1972 Summer Olympics.

He died in Albuquerque on 11 January 2022, at the age of 71.
