= Aleksandr Yudin =

Soviet cyclist

Personal information
- Born: 23 August 1949
- Died: 1986 (aged 36–37)

Cycling career
- Sport: Cycling

Aleksandr Yudin (26 October 1949 – 1986) was a Soviet cyclist. He competed in the team pursuit event at the 1972 Summer Olympics.
