= Luciano Borgognoni =

Italian cyclist

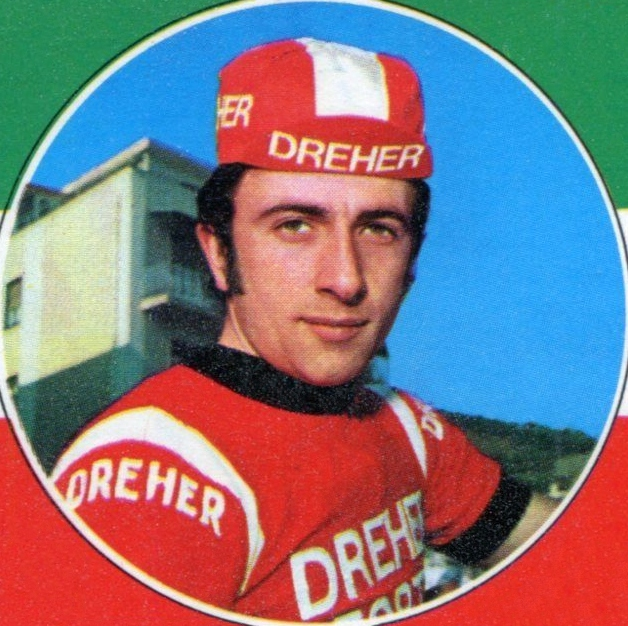
- Borgognoni in 1973

Personal information
- Born: 12 October 1951 Gallarate, Italy
- Died: 2 August 2014 (aged 62) Gallarate, Italy
- Height: 171 cm (5 ft 7 in)
- Weight: 71 kg (157 lb)

Cycling career
- Sport: Cycling
- Disciplines: Road; Track
- Role: Rider

Amateur teams
- 1970–1971: Varese–Ganna
- 1972: Passerini Gum

Professional teams
- 1973–1974: Dreherforte
- 1975: Zonca–Santini
- 1976: Brooklyn
- 1977–1979: Vibor
- 1980–1981: Hoonved–Bottecchia
- 1982: Del Tongo
Medal record
Representing Italy
UCI Track Cycling World Championships
Gold medal – first place	1971 Varese	Team pursuit

Luciano Borgognoni (12 October 1951 – 2 August 2014) was an Italian cyclist. As an amateur he won the 4000 m team pursuit event at the 1971 World Championships and placed fifth and ninth in the individual and team pursuit at the 1972 Summer Olympics, respectively. After the Olympics he became professional road racer and won the Giro del Friuli and one stage in the Giro di Sardegna in 1974. He rode the Giro d’Italia in 1973–82 and won two stages in 1977. He failed to complete the 1976 Tour de France.

== Major results ==
=== Road ===
1971
1st Stages 4 (TTT) & 5 Giro della Valle d'Aosta
1972
1st Giro dei Tre Laghi
1st Stage 6 Giro Ciclistico d'Italia
1974
1st Giro del Friuli
2nd Overall Giro di Sardegna

1st Stage 4

7th Giro di Romagna
8th Tre Valli Varesine
1975
1st GP Cemab
5th Giro del Veneto
5th Coppa Bernocchi
6th Overall Giro di Sardegna
7th Tre Valli Varesine
10th Trofeo Matteotti
1977
1st Stages 2b & 22 Giro d'Italia
1st Milano–Vignola
2nd Giro di Romagna
4th GP Montelupo
8th Overall Tour Méditerranéen
1978
1st Overall (TTT) Cronostaffetta
10th Züri-Metzgete
1979
6th Milan–San Remo

=== Grand Tour general classification results timeline ===
Grand Tour	1973	1974	1975	1976	1977	1978	1979	1980	1981	1982
Giro d'Italia	94	DNF	23	—	53	57	DNF	DNF	54	DNF
Tour de France	—	—	—	DNF	—	—	—	—	—	—
Vuelta a España	—	—	—	—	—	—	—	—	—	—

Legend
—	Did not compete
DNF	Did not finish

=== Track ===
1971
1st Team pursuit, UCI Amateur World Championships (with Giacomo Bazzan, Giorgio Morbiato & Pietro Algeri)
1st Individual pursuit, National Amateur Track Championships
1974
1st Individual pursuit, National Track Championships
1976
1st Individual pursuit, National Track Championships
