= Leon Daelemans =

Belgian cyclist

Personal information
- Born: 18 April 1949 (age 77) Neerpelt, Belgium

Cycling career
- Sport: Cycling

Leon Daelemans (born 18 April 1949) is a former Belgian cyclist. He competed in the team pursuit event at the 1972 Summer Olympics.
