= Denfield McNab =

Belizean cyclist

Personal information
- Born: 4 May 1943 (age 83) Punta Gorda, Belize
- Height: 5 ft 9 in (175 cm)
- Weight: 73 kg (161 lb)

Cycling career
- Sport: Cycling

Denfield Roosevelt McNab (born 4 May 1943) is a former Belizean cyclist. He competed in the individual pursuit at the 1968 Summer Olympics.
