= Paul Crapez =

Belgian cyclist

Personal information
- Born: 17 April 1947 (age 79) Montignies-sur-Roc, Belgium

Cycling career
- Sport: Cycling

Paul Crapez (born 17 April 1947) is a former Belgian cyclist. He competed in the individual pursuit and team pursuit events at the 1968 Summer Olympics.
