= Raúl Halket =

Argentine cyclist (born 1951)

Personal information
- Born: 4 April 1951 (age 75)

Cycling career
- Sport: Cycling

Raúl Halket (born 4 April 1951) is a former Argentine cyclist. He competed in the team pursuit event at the 1972 Summer Olympics.
