= Paweł Kaczorowski (cyclist) =

Polish cyclist

Personal information
- Born: 28 September 1949 (age 77) Łódź, Poland

Cycling career
- Sport: Cycling

Paweł Kaczorowski (born 28 September 1949) is a former Polish cyclist. He competed in the team pursuit event at the 1972 Summer Olympics.
