= Jiří Mikšík =

Czech cyclist

Personal information
- Born: 2 January 1952 (age 74) Brno, Czechoslovakia

Cycling career
- Sport: Cycling

Jiří Mikšík (born 2 January 1952) is a Czech former cyclist. He competed in the team pursuit event at the 1972 Summer Olympics.
