= Roger De Beukelaer =

Belgian cyclist

Personal information
- Born: 16 May 1951 (age 75) Antwerp, Belgium

Cycling career
- Sport: Cycling

Roger De Beukelaer (born 16 May 1951) is a former Belgian cyclist. He competed in the team pursuit event at the 1972 Summer Olympics.
