= Colin Forde (cyclist) =

Barbadian cyclist

Personal information
- Born: 16 September 1949 (age 77) Barbados

Cycling career
- Sport: Cycling

Colin Forde (born 16 September 1949) is a Barbadian former cyclist. He competed in the individual road race and the individual pursuit events at the 1968 Summer Olympics.
