= Raúl Gómez (cyclist) =

Argentine cyclist

Personal information
- Born: 3 April 1945
- Died: 23 April 2010 (aged 65)

Cycling career
- Sport: Cycling

Raúl Alberto Gómez (3 April 1945 – 23 April 2010) was an Argentine cyclist. He competed in the team pursuit event at the 1972 Summer Olympics.

Gómez died on 23 April 2010, at the age of 65.
