= Philip Sawyer (cyclist) =

Australian cyclist

Personal information
- Born: 29 December 1951 (age 74)

Cycling career
- Sport: Cycling

Philip Sawyer (born 29 December 1951) is a former Australian cyclist. He competed in the team pursuit event at the 1972 Summer Olympics.

Sawyer won the 1982 – 2000 metres Marlboro Wangaratta Wheelrace at the Wangaratta Showgrounds, riding off 25 metres.
