= Maximo Junta =

Filipino cyclist

Personal information
- Born: December 2, 1950 (age 75)
- Height: 162 cm (5 ft 4 in)
- Weight: 52 kg (115 lb)

Cycling career
- Sport: Cycling

Maximo Junta Jr. (born December 2, 1950) is a Filipino former cyclist. He competed in the individual road race and individual pursuit events at the 1972 Summer Olympics.
