= Plamen Timchev =

Bulgarian cyclist

Personal information
- Born: 12 July 1951 (age 75) Gabrovo, Bulgaria

Cycling career
- Sport: Cycling

Plamen Timchev (Bulgarian: Пламен Тимчев, born 12 July 1951) is a Bulgarian former cyclist. He competed in the team pursuit event at the 1972 Summer Olympics.
