= Anatoly Stepanenko =

Soviet cyclist

Personal information
- Born: 23 August 1949 (age 77) Karaganda, Kazakh SSR, USSR

Cycling career
- Sport: Cycling

Anatoly Grigorievich Stepanenko (Russian: Анато́лий Григо́рьевич Степане́нко; born 23 August 1949) is a Soviet former cyclist. He competed in the team pursuit event at the 1972 Summer Olympics.
