= Bernard Kręczyński =

Polish cyclist

Personal information
- Born: 28 April 1953 (age 73) Stargard, Poland

Cycling career
- Sport: Cycling

Bernard Kręczyński (born 28 April 1953) is a former Polish cyclist. He competed in the team pursuit event at the 1972 Summer Olympics.
