= Brian Keast =

Canadian cyclist

Personal information
- Born: 27 November 1953 (age 72) Vancouver, British Columbia, Canada

Cycling career
- Sport: Cycling

Brian Keast (born 27 November 1953) is a Canadian former cyclist. He competed in the team pursuit event at the 1972 Summer Olympics.
