= Taghikhan Khodavand =

Iranian cyclist

Personal information
- Full name: Mohammad Taghikhan Khodavand
- Born: March 7, 1950 Tehran, Iran
- Died: Unknown

Cycling career
- Sport: Cycling

Mohammad Taghikhan Khodavand (Persian: محمدتقی‌خان خداوند, born 7 March 1950) was a former Iranian cyclist. He competed in the team time trial and team pursuit events at the 1972 Summer Olympics.
