= Michel Zucarelli =

French cyclist

Personal information
- Born: 30 October 1953 (age 72) Montfermeil, France

Cycling career
- Sport: Cycling

Michel Zucarelli (born 30 October 1953) is a French former cyclist. He competed in the individual and team pursuit events at the 1972 Summer Olympics.
