= Rupert Kratzer =

German cyclist

Personal information
- Born: 16 February 1945 Munich, Nazi Germany
- Died: 23 September 2013 (aged 68) Bayern, Germany

Cycling career
- Sport: Cycling

Rupert Kratzer (16 February 1945 – 23 September 2013) was a German cyclist. He competed in the individual pursuit at the 1968 Summer Olympics.
