= Ronald Keeble =

English cyclist (b.1941)

Ron Keeble
Personal information
- Nationality: British (English)
- Born: 14 January 1941 (age 85) London, England
- Height: 177 cm (5 ft 10 in)
- Weight: 64 kg (141 lb)

Sport
- Club: 34th Nomads CC
Medal record
Representing Great Britain
Men's cycling
Olympic Games
Bronze medal – third place	1972 Munich	Team Pursuit

Ronald James Keeble (born 14 January 1941) is a former British international cyclist who represented Great Britain at two Olympic Games.

== Biography ==
At the 1968 Olympic Games in Mexico City, Keeble participated in the team pursuit.

Keeble represented the England team at the 1970 British Commonwealth Games in Edinburgh, Scotland, where he participated in the scratch race and time trial events.

At the 1972 Olympic Games in Munich, Keeble won the bronze medal in team pursuit with Michael Bennett, Ian Hallam and Willi Moore.
