= Marcello Osler =

Italian cyclist (1945–2023)

Personal information
- Born: 18 August 1945 Pergine Valsugana, Italy
- Died: 21 July 2023 (aged 77)

Cycling career
- Sport: Cycling
- Role: Rider

Marcello Osler (18 August 1945 – 21 July 2023) was an Italian professional racing cyclist.

When an amateur, Osler won several races, notably the Trofeo Papà Cervi. A professional rider from 1973 to 1980, he rode in seven editions of the Giro d'Italia and in the 1976 Tour de France. He won a stage at the 1975 Giro d'Italia, and won the Giro's Campionato delle Regioni classification in 1975 and 1976. In 1976, he was selected as a reserve in the Italian team for the UCI Road World Championships. Between 1978 and 1980 he was domestique of Francesco Moser.

After his retirement, Osler ran a sport store in his hometown. In 2013, he survived a heart attack that left him in a wheelchair. He died on 21 July 2023, at the age of 77.
