= Herbert Richter =

East German cyclist

Personal information
- Born: 26 April 1947 (age 79) Chemnitz, Soviet occupation zone of Germany
- Height: 1.75 m (5 ft 9 in)
- Weight: 68 kg (150 lb)

Cycling career
- Sport: Cycling
Medal record
Representing East Germany
Olympic Games
Silver medal – second place	1972 Munich	Team pursuit
World championships
Silver medal – second place	1970 Leicester	Team pursuit
Silver medal – second place	1971 Varese	Team pursuit

Herbert Richter (born 26 April 1947) is a retired East German track cyclist. He had his best achievements in the 4000m team pursuit event, winning silver medals at the world championships in 1970 and 1971 and at the 1972 Summer Olympics.
