= Daniel Yuste =

Spanish cyclist (1944–2020)

Personal information
- Full name: Daniel Yuste Escolar
- Born: 17 November 1944 Leganés, Spain
- Died: 26 March 2020 (aged 75)

Cycling career
- Sport: Cycling

Professional teams
- 1969: Pepsi-Cola
- 1970: Ignis

Daniel Yuste Escolar (17 November 1944 – 26 March 2020) was a Spanish cyclist. He competed in the individual pursuit at the 1968 Summer Olympics.

Escolar died at the age of 75 on 26 March 2020, due to complications of COVID-19 during the pandemic.
