= Anita Kurmann =

Swiss endocrinologist and thyroid surgeon (1976-2015)

Anita Agatha Kurmann (November 22, 1976 – August 7, 2015) was a Swiss endocrinologist and thyroid surgeon.

== Life ==
Anita studied medicine in Basel and worked at the Inselspital in Bern, then moved to Boston to train in research at the Beth Israel Deaconess hospital, where she was a post-doctoral fellow. She worked with a multi-institution group based at Boston University that was the first to generate thyroid cell progenitors and thyroid follicular organoids from pluripotent stem cells (PSCs) in mice, and thyroid cell progenitors from induced PSCs in humans. This was achieved by establishing the signalling required to create a thyroid lineage, namely BMP4 and FGF2. It was shown that thyroid hormones were secreted by the mice organoids after transplantation into mice.

== Death ==
Kurmann was planning to return to Switzerland to become head of endocrine surgery at the Inselspital, but was killed in a bicycle crash in Boston. As she was riding south on Mass Ave, a flatbed tractor trailer, driven by Matthew Levari, turned right onto Beacon Street in front of her and Anita was run over by the trailer's wheels. The group's paper of which she was co-lead author was dedicated to her memory.

Police investigators concluded that Kurmann failed to recognize the truck was turning and was riding in the truck's blind spot. All large trucks have 4 documented blind spots, the largest of which is on the right side of the vehicle. Though trucks in many European countries have begun to utilize or require a 6 mirror system to eliminate the driver's inability to see in these blindspots and/or advanced collision sensors with automatic braking, no such equipment is required for large trucks driving on America's urban roads.

Following the investigation, prosecutors declined to bring criminal charges against Levari. The Massachusetts Bicycle Coalition (MassBike) advocacy group, however, maintained that charges of involuntary manslaughter or operating to endanger were warranted. While police argued that Kurmann failed to notice Levari's truck despite his activating its turn signal eight seconds prior to making the turn, MassBike maintained that Levari should have been aware of Kurmann, pointing to video evidence showing that Levari had previously passed Kurmann and that she had been riding alongside the truck for at least 16 seconds prior to the crash. Advocates also argued that Levari had violated Massachusetts laws requiring drivers to make right turns only from the right lane and prohibiting unsafe right turns in the path of an oncoming cyclist, and they questioned why the incident was not treated as a hit-and-run despite Levari failing to stop after striking Kurmann and only contacting police later that afternoon while in Pennsylvania. Some argued that the lack of charges reflected a trend of unwillingness to prosecute drivers who kill cyclists and bias in favor of drivers in motor vehicle–bicycle crashes.

Following this crash, the intersection of Beacon Street where it occurred was equipped with advanced stop lines.
