= Emil Rusu =

Romanian cyclist

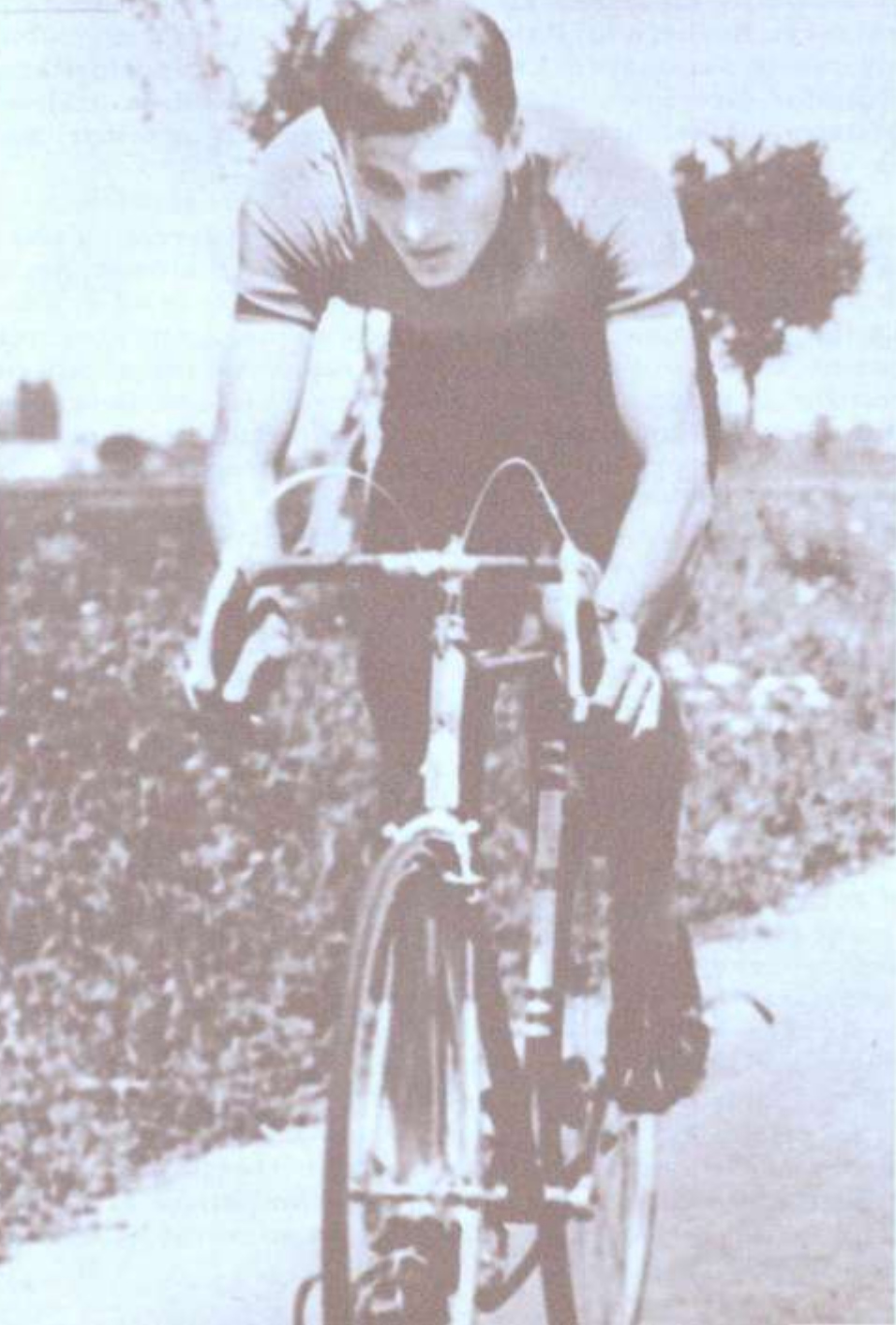

Personal information
- Born: 26 December 1946 (age 79) Bujoreni, Romania

Cycling career
- Sport: Cycling

Emil Rusu (born 26 December 1946) is a Romanian former cyclist. He competed at the 1964 Summer Olympics and the 1968 Summer Olympics.
