= Inocente Lizano =

Cuban cyclist

Personal information
- Born: 28 December 1940 (age 85) Las Villas, Cuba

Cycling career
- Sport: Cycling

Inocente Lizano (born 28 December 1940) is a Cuban former cyclist. He competed in the individual pursuit and the team pursuit events at the 1968 Summer Olympics.
