= William Moore (cyclist) =

British cyclist

Willi Moore
Personal information
- Born: 2 April 1947 (age 79) Liverpool, England
- Height: 182 cm (6 ft 0 in)
- Weight: 67 kg (148 lb)

Sport
- Club: Merseyside Wheelers
Medal record
Men's cycling
Representing Great Britain
Olympic Games
Bronze medal – third place	1972 Munich	Team Pursuit
Representing England
British Commonwealth Games
Gold medal – first place	1974 Christchurch	Team Pursuit
Silver medal – second place	1974 Christchurch	Individual Pursuit

William 'Willi' Moore (born 2 April 1947) is a former British international cyclist who represented Great Britain at the Olympic Games.

== Biography ==
Moore represented the England team at the 1970 British Commonwealth Games in Edinburgh, Scotland, where he participated in the individual pursuit.

At the 1972 Olympic Games in Munich, Moore won the bronze medal in team pursuit with Michael Bennett, Ian Hallam and Ron Keeble.

Two years later he participated in the pursuit disciplines at the 1974 British Commonwealth Games in Christchurch, New Zealand and won a gold medal in the 4,000 metres team pursuit and a silver medal in the 4,000 metres individual pursuit.
