= Svend Erik Bjerg =

Danish cyclist

Personal information
- Born: 16 November 1944 Maribo, Denmark
- Died: 2 August 2023 (aged 78)

Cycling career
- Sport: Cycling

Svend Erik Bjerg (16 November 1944 – 2 August 2023) was a Danish cyclist. He competed at the 1968 Summer Olympics and the 1972 Summer Olympics.
