= Jürgen Colombo =

German cyclist (born 1949)

Personal information
- Born: 2 September 1949 (age 77) Zielona Góra, Polish People’s Republic

Cycling career
- Sport: Cycling
Medal record
Men's cycling
Representing West Germany
Olympic Games
| Gold medal – first place | 1972 Munich | Team Pursuit |

Jürgen Colombo (born 2 September 1949) is a retired track cyclist from West Germany, who won the gold medal in the Men's 4000m Team Pursuit at the 1972 Summer Olympics in Munich, alongside Günther Schumacher, Günter Haritz, and Udo Hempel.
