= Heinz Richter (cyclist) =

German former track cyclist

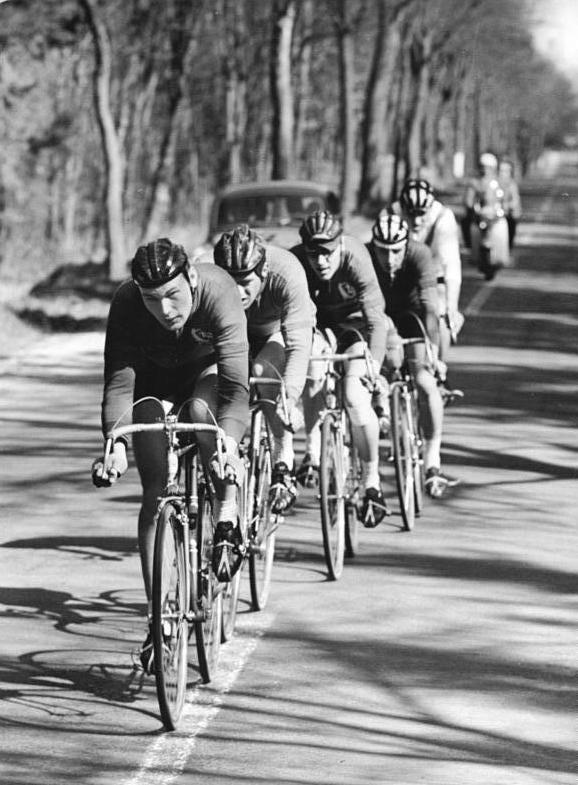
- Heinz Richter (in the front) cycling in 1967

Personal information
- Born: 24 July 1947 (age 79) Zittau, Soviet occupation zone of Germany

Cycling career
- Sport: Cycling
Medal record
Men's cycling
Representing East Germany
Olympic Games
Silver medal – second place	1972 Munich	4000m pursuit

Heinz Richter (born 24 July 1947), is a German former track cyclist, who won the silver medal for East Germany in the 4000m pursuit at the 1972 Summer Olympics in Munich and 13 championships. He competed for the SC Dynamo Berlin / Sportvereinigung (SV) Dynamo.
