= Fabrizio Fabbri =

Italian cyclist (1948–2019)

Personal information
- Born: 28 September 1948 Ferruccia di Agliana, Italy
- Died: 3 June 2019 (aged 70)

Cycling career
- Sport: Cycling
- Discipline: Road
- Role: Rider

Professional teams
- 1970: Filotex
- 1971: Cosatto
- 1972: Van Cauter–Magniflex–de Gribaldy
- 1973: Magniflex
- 1974: Sammontana
- 1975–1976: Bianchi–Campagnolo
- 1977-1979: Sanson

Fabrizio Fabbri (28 September 1948 – 3 June 2019) was an Italian cyclist.

== Major results ==
1970
3rd Gran Premio Industria e Commercio di Prato
1971
2nd Giro dell'Appennino
1972
1st Stage 5 Giro d'Italia
1973
1st Gran Premio Industria e Commercio di Prato
1st Stage 2 Tour de Suisse
2nd Giro dell'Umbria
2nd Coppa Placci
3rd Giro di Toscana
1974
1st Gran Premio Industria e Commercio di Prato
1st Overall Giro di Puglia
2nd Coppa Bernocchi
1975
1st Stage 16 Giro d'Italia
1st Giro dell'Appennino
1st Tre Valli Varesine
2nd Giro dell'Umbria
1976
1st Stage 9 Giro d'Italia
