= Monte Maddalena =

Mountain in Italy

Coordinates: 45°34′N 10°17′E

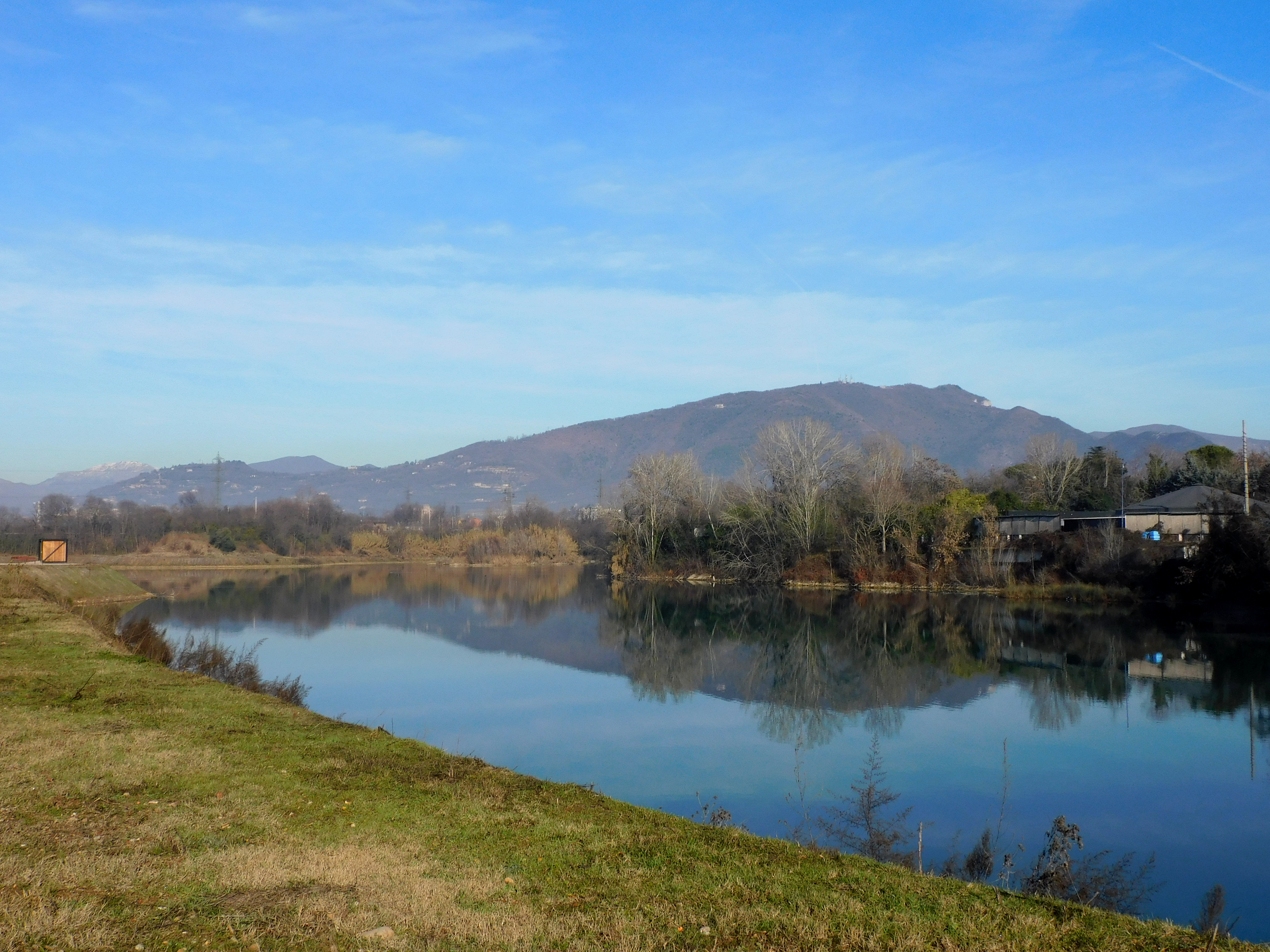

Highest point
- Elevation: 874 m (2,867 ft)

Geography
- Location: Lombardy, Italy

Monte Maddalena is a mountain of Lombardy, Italy, It has an elevation of 874 metres.

Paragliding is a popular sport because of the updrafts from Lake Garda. Overlooking the city of Brescia, Monte Maddalena is also popular for hiking and bicycling.

== Gallery ==
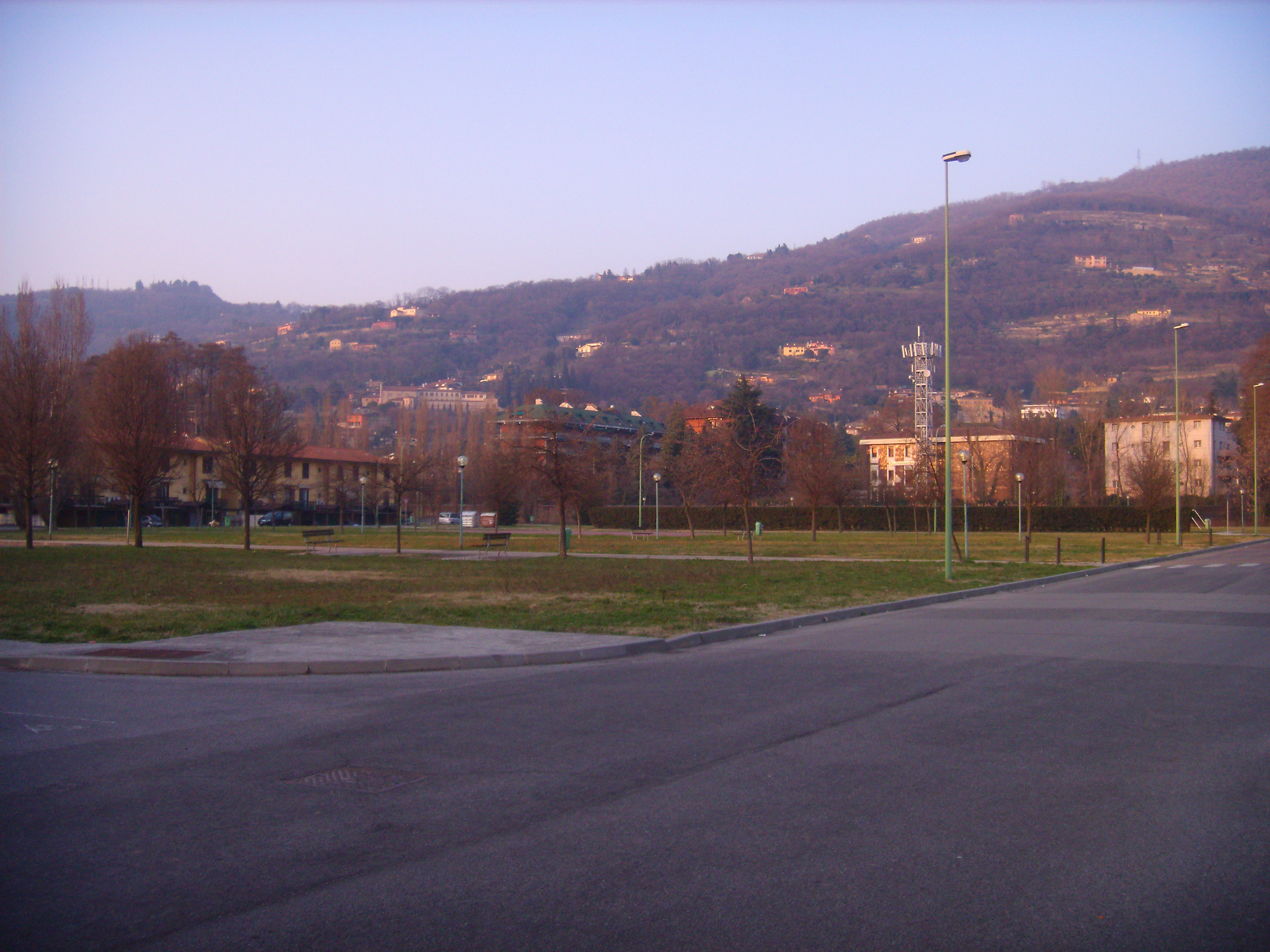
