= 1976 UCI Road World Championships =

- Championships badge

- Venue: Ostuni, Italy
- Date: 4–5 September 1976
- Coordinates: 40°44′N 17°35′E
- Events: 2

The 1976 UCI Road World Championships took place from 4–5 September 1976 in Ostuni, Italy. Only two races took place due to the Montreal Olympics.

In the same period, the 1976 UCI Track Cycling World Championships were organized in Monteroni di Lecce.

== Results ==
Race:	Gold:	Time	Silver:	Time	Bronze :	Time
Men
Men's road race	Freddy Maertens; Belgium	7.06'10"	Francesco Moser; Italy	s.t.	Tino Conti; Italy	+11"
Women
Women's road race	Keetie van Oosten-Hage; Netherlands	-	Luigina Bissoli; Italy	-	Yvonne Reynders; Belgium	-

== Medal table ==
Rank	Nation	Gold	Silver	Bronze	Total
1	Belgium (BEL)	1	0	1	2
2	Netherlands (NED)	1	0	0	1
3	Italy (ITA)	0	2	1	3
Totals (3 entries)		2	2	2	6
