= Pontoglio =

Pontoglio Pontòi
- Comune
- Comune di Pontoglio
- Coat of arms

- Location within Italy Location within Lombardy
- Coordinates: 45°34′N 9°51′E
- Country: Italy
- Region: Lombardy
- Province: Brescia (BS)

Government
  - Mayor: Alessandro Giuseppe Seghezzi

Area
  - Total: 11.22 km^{2} (4.33 sq mi)
- Elevation: 155 m (509 ft)

Population (2011)
  - Total: 7,088
  - Density: 631.7/km^{2} (1,636/sq mi)
- Demonym: Pontogliesi
- Time zone: UTC+1 (CET)
  - Summer (DST): UTC+2 (CEST)
- Postal code: 25037
- Dialing code: 030
- Patron saint: Saint Maria Assunta, Saint Antony
- Saint day: 15 August, 17 January
- Website: Official website

Pontoglio (Brescian: Pontòi) is a comune in the province of Brescia, in Lombardy, Italy. It is situated on the left bank of the river Oglio.
