= Fausto Bertoglio =

Italian cyclist

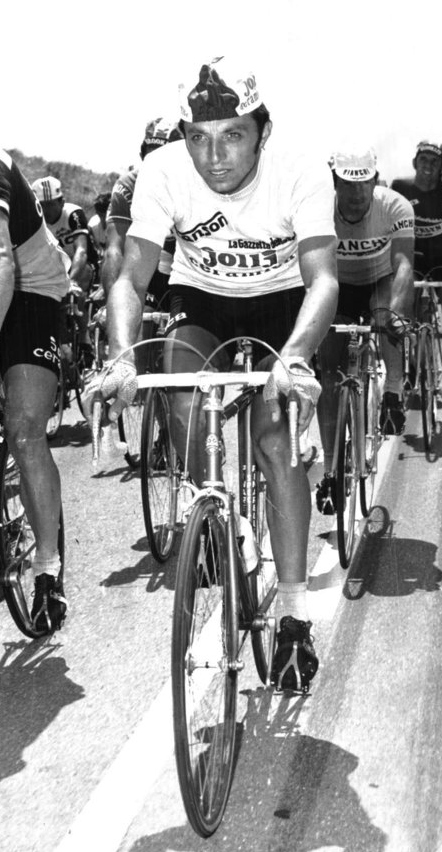
- Bertoglio at the 1975 Giro d'Italia

Personal information
- Full name: Fausto Bertoglio
- Born: 13 January 1949 (age 77) Brescia, Italy

Cycling career
- Sport: Cycling
- Discipline: Road
- Role: Rider

Professional teams
- 1973–1974: Brooklyn
- 1975–1977: Jollj Ceramica
- 1978: Selle Royal–Inoxpran
- 1979: San Giacomo–Mobilificio–Alan
- 1980: Sanson–Campagnolo

Major wins
- Grand Tours Giro d'Italia General classification (1975) 1 individual stage (1975) Stage races Volta a Catalunya (1975)

Fausto Bertoglio (born 13 January 1949) is a retired Italian professional road bicycle racer. The highlight of his career was his overall win in the 1975 Giro d'Italia with the Jollj Ceramica team. It was the first Giro d'Italia victory on a Pinarello bicycle frameset. He also won the 1975 edition of the Volta a Catalunya. He finished third in the 1976 Giro d'Italia and ninth in the 1976 Tour de France.

== Career achievements ==
=== Major results ===
1971
9th Trofeo Alcide Degasperi
1972
1st Overall Settimana Bergamasca
5th Overall Giro Ciclistico d'Italia
1974
10th Overall Tour de Romandie
1975
1st Overall Giro d'Italia

1st Stage 14 (ITT)

1st Overall Volta a Catalunya

1st Stages 5 & 7b (ITT)

2nd Coppa Bernocchi
5th Gran Premio Città di Camaiore
8th Giro del Veneto
10th Giro dell'Emilia
10th Gran Premio di Lugano
1976
1st Coppa Placci
1st Stage 7a (ITT) Volta a Catalunya
3rd Overall Giro d'Italia
5th Overall Giro di Puglia
7th Coppa Bernocchi
9th Overall Tour de France
1978
5th Overall Tour de Romandie
7th Overall Tirreno–Adriatico
10th Overall Giro di Sardegna
1979
7th Overall Giro d'Italia
7th Overall Grand Prix du Midi Libre
10th Milano–Torino

=== Grand Tour general classification results timeline ===
Grand Tour	1973	1974	1975	1976	1977	1978	1979	1980
Vuelta a España	—	—	—	—	—	—	—	—
Giro d'Italia	46	—	1	3	DNF	14	7	29
Tour de France	—	23	—	9	—	—	—	—

Legend
—	Did not compete
DNF	Did not finish
