= Günter Haritz =

German cyclist (1948–2025)

- Haritz during the 1976 Six Days of Munich

Personal information
- Born: 16 October 1948 Heidelberg, Württemberg-Baden, Allied-occupied Germany
- Died: 29 October 2025 (aged 77)

Cycling career
- Sport: Cycling

Professional teams
- 1973–1974: Rokado
- 1975–1977: TI-Raleigh
- 1978: IJsboerke-Gios
- 1979: Kondor
- 1980: Rauler-Gipiemme
- 1981: Citizen-La Hutte
Medal record
Men's cycling
Representing West Germany
Olympic Games
Gold medal – first place	1972 Munich	Team Pursuit

Günter Haritz (16 October 1948 – 29 October 2025) was a road and track cyclist from West Germany who won the gold medal in the Men's 4.000 Team Pursuit at the 1972 Summer Olympics in Munich alongside Günther Schumacher, Jürgen Colombo and Udo Hempel. In 1973, together with Peter Vonhof, Hans Lutz and Günther Schumacher, Haritz won the amateur world title in the team pursuit.

== Career ==
Haritz was a professional cyclist from 1973 to 1982, winning the national road championship in 1974 and coming second and third in 1975 and 1976 respectively and third again in 1979. The chief part of his professional career concerned racing on the track. Haritz rode 83 six-day races, winning 11 of them from 1975 to 1977 during which time he was in the top 5 riders in the He won seven Sixes races with René Pijnen, two with Dietrich Thurau (both of whom were his then teammates with TI–Raleigh), one with Patrick Sercu (the 1975 Six Days of Zürich) and one, in Grenoble, with the Frenchman Bernard Thévenet.

In the 1976 Grenoble Six, Haritz partnered with Bernard Thévenet, winner of the 1975 Tour de France and the 1975 and 1976 editions of the Critérium du Dauphiné Libéré, to claim victory. They finished ahead of Francesco Moser and René Pijnen in second place and Felice Gimondi and Patrick Sercu in third. Other competitiots included Joop Zoetemelk, who finished tenth, and Bernard Hinault, a future five-time Tour de France winner, finished twelfth and last alongside Jacques Bossis.

Corroborating his performances in the Six-Day races in these years, he won the 1975 edition of the European championship Derny racing and in 1976 with Pijnen the European Madison championship in Zurich, beating the Australians Danny Clark and Donald Allan (2nd) and Sercu and Klaus Bugdahl (3rd). In 1977, in Copenhagen with Wilfried Peffgen, he took the bronze medal in the European Madison championship won by the Belgians Patrick Sercu and Eddy Merckx.

At the 1976 Vuelta a España, Haritz tested positive for doping and left the race after the B-test also was positive.

== Death ==
Haritz died from cancer on 29 October 2025 at the age of 77.
