= Ad Dekkers (cyclist) =

Dutch cyclist (1953–2002)

Personal information
- Full name: Adrianus Dekkers
- Born: 1 November 1953 Udenhout, the Netherlands
- Died: 29 July 2002 (aged 48)
- Height: 1.83 m (6 ft 0 in)
- Weight: 76 kg (168 lb)

Cycling career
- Sport: Cycling

Adrianus "Ad" Dekkers (1 November 1953 – 29 July 2002) was a Dutch cyclist who was active between 1972 and 1983. He competed at the 1972 Summer Olympics in the 4 km team pursuit and finished in fifth place. Two years later he won one stage of the Olympia's Tour, finishing second in the overall race.

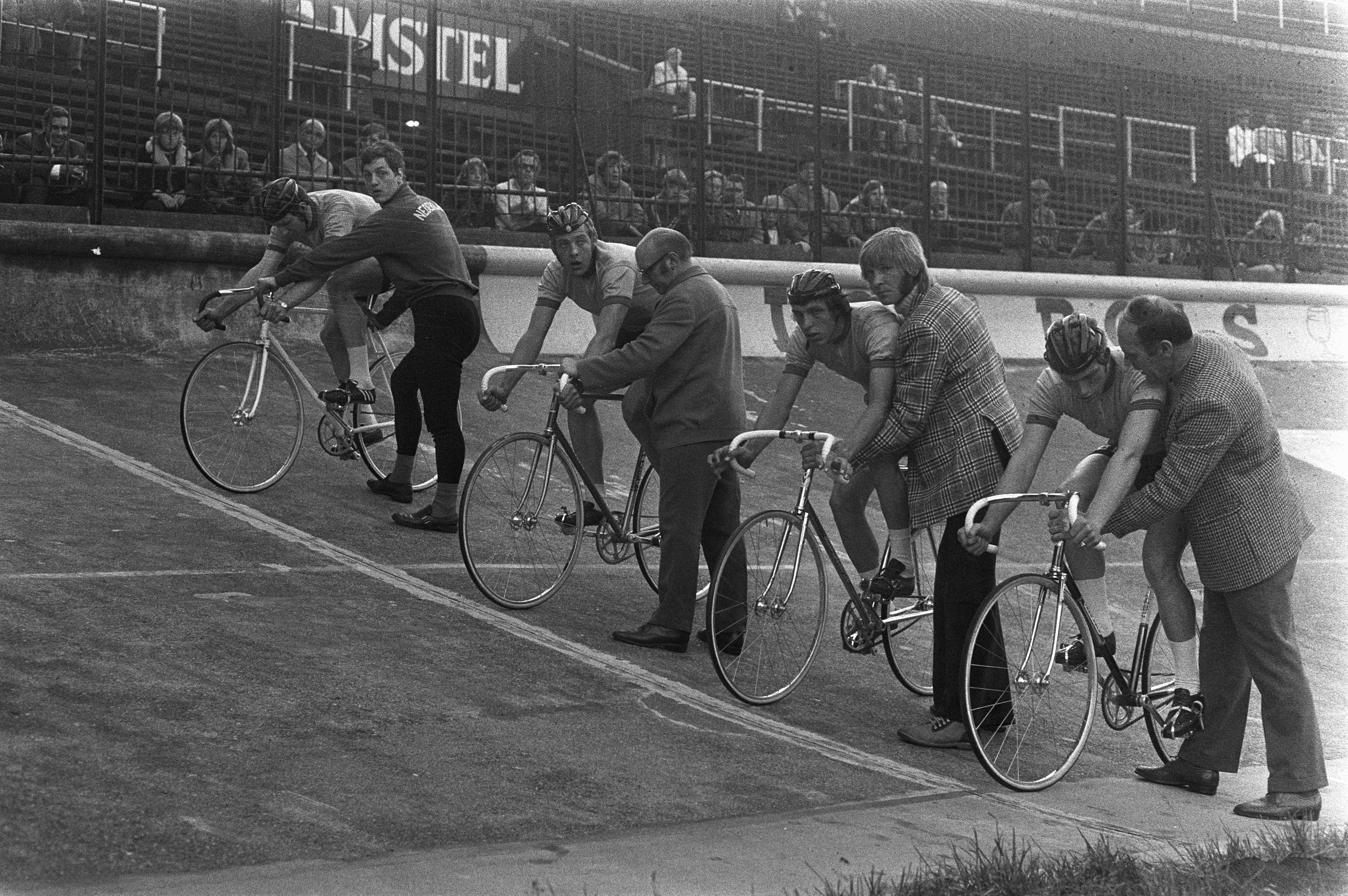
The Dutch Olympic pursuit team 1972, Dekkers is third from left

== See also ==
- List of Dutch Olympic cyclists
