= Tino Conti =

Italian cyclist (1945–2026)

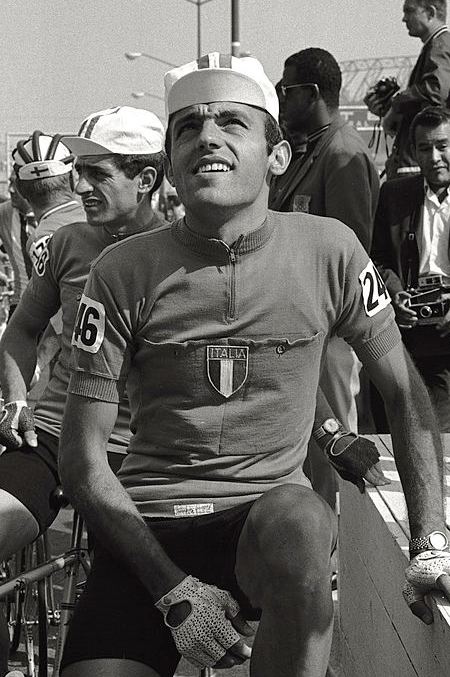
- Conti at the 1968 Olympics

Personal information
- Full name: Costantino Conti
- Nickname: Tino Conti
- Born: 26 September 1945 Nibionno, Italy
- Died: 10 June 2026 (aged 80)

Cycling career
- Sport: Cycling
- Discipline: Road
- Role: Rider

Professional teams
- 1969: Faema
- 1970–1971: Scic
- 1972: Ferretti
- 1973–1974: Zonca
- 1975: Furzi–FT
- 1976: Magniflex–Torpado
- 1977: Zonca–Santini
- 1978: Gis Gelati
Medal record
Representing Italy
Men's road cycling
World Championships
Bronze medal – third place	1976 Ostuni	Road race
Mediterranean Games
Gold medal – first place	1967 Tunis	Road race

Costantino "Tino" Conti (26 September 1945 – 10 June 2026) was an Italian road cyclist who competed in the individual road race at the 1968 Summer Olympics. After that he turned professional and won a bronze medal at the 1976 World Championships. He also rode the Tour de France in 1970 and 1971 and finished within the podium at several major races.

Conti died on 10 June 2026, at the age of 80.

== Major results ==
1967
1st Road race, Mediterranean Games
2nd Overall Tour de l'Avenir

1st Stage 1a

1970
2nd Coppa Agostoni
3rd GP Monaco
3rd Trofeo Matteotti
1971
2nd Tre Valli Varesine
1972
1st Gran Premio Industria e Commercio di Prato
1974
1st Tre Valli Varesine
2nd Gran Premio Industria e Commercio di Prato
2nd Giro del Veneto
2nd Giro del Piemonte
3rd Giro di Lombardia
3rd Giro della Provincia di Reggio Calabria
3rd Gran Premio Industria Belmonte Piceno
3rd Giro dell'Emilia
4th Overall Giro d'Italia
1975
1st Giro di Toscana
1st Gran Premio Industria e Commercio di Prato
1st Stage 3 Giro di Puglia
3rd Road race, National Road Championships
3rd Giro della Provincia di Reggio Calabria
3rd Trofeo Pantalica
3rd Giro di Campania
3rd Trofeo Matteotti
3rd Giro di Puglia
4th Milan–San Remo
8th Overall Giro d'Italia
1976
3rd Road race, UCI Road World Championships
9th Giro di Lombardia
1977
1st Giro della Provincia di Reggio Calabria

== Grand Tour results ==
Tour de France

- 1970: DNF
- 1971: DNF

Giro d'Italia

- 1973: 51st
- 1974: 4th
- 1975: 8th
