= Udo Hempel =

German cyclist (born 1946)

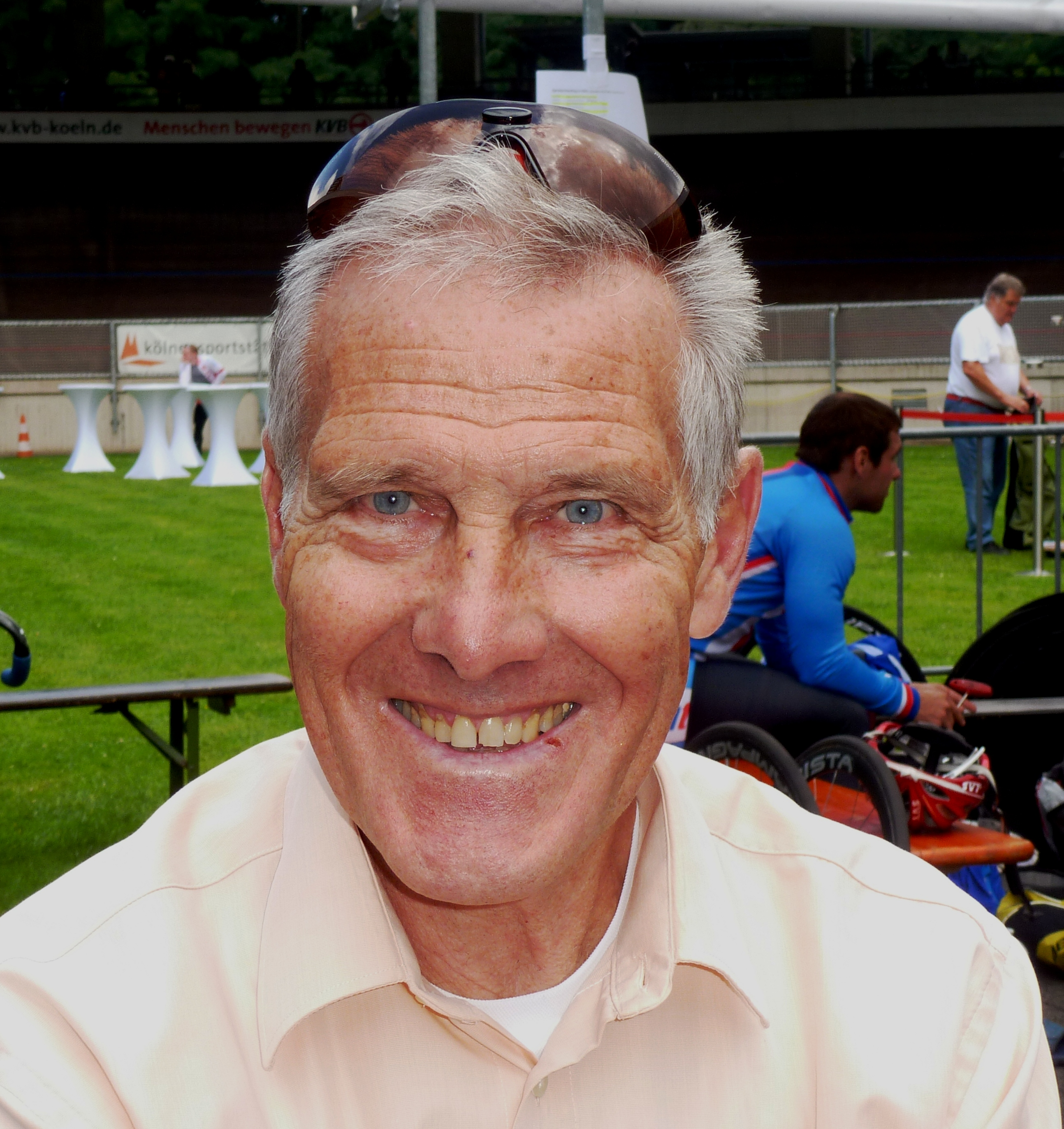
- Hempel in 2012

Personal information
- Full name: Udo Hempel
- Born: 3 November 1946 (age 79) Düsseldorf, Allied-occupied Germany

Cycling career
- Sport: Cycling
- Discipline: Track
- Role: Rider

Professional teams
- 1973–1974: Unknown
- 1975: Rokado
- 1976: Maes-Rokado
- 1977–1982: Quelle-Mars
- 1983: A.B.C.
Medal record
Men's track cycling
Representing West Germany
Olympic Games
Silver medal – second place	1968 Mexico City	Team pursuit
Gold medal – first place	1972 Munich	Team pursuit

Udo Hempel (born 3 November 1946) is a retired road and track cyclist from West Germany, who won the gold medal in the Men's 4.000 Team Pursuit at the 1972 Summer Olympics in Munich, alongside Günther Schumacher, Jürgen Colombo, and Günter Haritz. In the 1968 Summer Olympics, he had already won silver in the same event. He was a professional cyclist from 1973 to 1983, whose best results were on the track.

Hempel was also part of the West German team that won the gold medal in the amateur 4 km pursuit world championship in Leicester in 1970.
