= John Bylsma =

Australian former track cyclist

Personal information
- Full name: John Christopher Bylsma
- Nickname: Hoss
- Born: 1 February 1946 (age 80) Bundaberg, Australia
- Height: 6 ft 2 1/2 in (189 cm)

Cycling career
- Sport: Cycling
- Discipline: Track X Road
- Role: Rider
- Rider type: Pursuitist

Amateur team
- 1962–1972: –

Professional team
- 1973–1975: –
Medal record
British Empire Games
Silver medal – second place	1966 Kingston	Men's Individual Pursuit

John Christopher Bylsma (born 1 February 1946) is an Australian former track cyclist who won a silver medal at the 1966 Commonwealth Games in the 4000 metre individual pursuit. He also competed at the 1968 Summer Olympics and the 1972 Summer Olympics.

== Palmarès ==
Australian Individual Pursuit Champion (Amateur)1965, 1966, 1967, 1968, 1969,1971 & 1972/ Australian Individual Pursuit Champion (Professional) 1973, 1975 1966:Silver Medalist -Pursuit, Cwlth Games Jamaica 1967: 4th World Championships, Amsterdam 1968: 4th Olympic Games, Mexico 1972: 4th Olympic Games, Munich 1965/1975 Winning member of 7 Australian Teams Pursuit Titles

BEST 4000 metre INDIVIDUAL PURSUIT TIMES

1966 - 4min.59.6 sec. qualifying round C'Wealth Games Jamaica - Placing Silver Medal

1967 - 4min 59.43sec - qualifying round World Titles - Amsterdam - placing fourth

1968 4min.59.4sec - qualifying round Australian Titles, Sydney.1st Australian to break 5min in Australia

1968 - 4min.41.1 sec qualifying round Olympic Games Mexico, placing fourth (altitude)

1972 - 4min 53.6sec Final Victorian Titles Australia placing first

1972 =- 4min50.6sec qualifying round Olympic Games, Munich placing fourth

Best 5000 metres pursuit individual 6min.10.6sec. Victorian Titles Australia 19/1/1974 in final Place 1sr

Road Races 1964: 1st Greenvale 100 Kilometre, 1966: 1st Bendigo to Charlton 1968: 1st Melbourne to Castlemaine, 1st Yea Open, 1st City of Adelaide Criterium, 1970: Fastest Time, Melbourne to Colac 1972: 1st Victorian 100 Kilometre Championship 1974: 1st, Fastest & 150Mile Champion, Melbourne to Warrnambool
