= Pietro Algeri =

Italian cyclist

Personal information
- Born: 2 October 1950 (age 76) Bergamo, Italy

Cycling career
- Sport: Cycling

Pietro Algeri (born 2 October 1950) is an Italian former cyclist. He competed in the team pursuit event at the 1972 Summer Olympics.
