= Xaver Kurmann =

Swiss cyclist (born 1948)

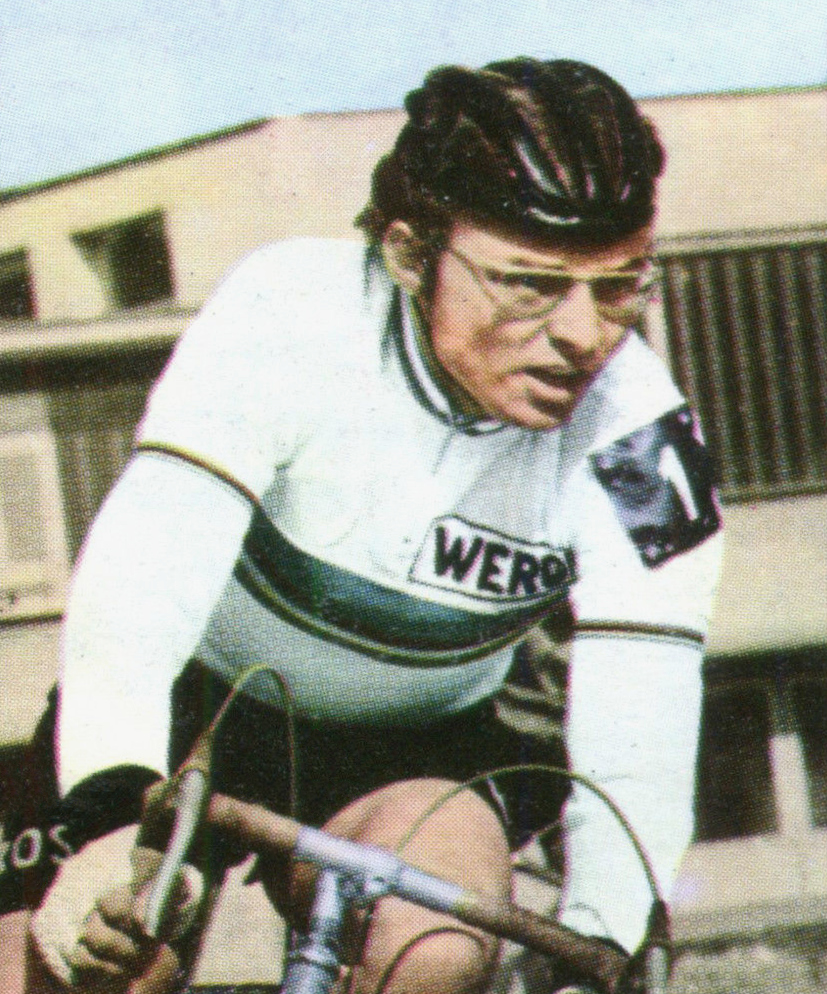

Personal information
- Born: 29 August 1948 (age 78) Emmen, Switzerland
- Height: 178 cm (5 ft 10 in)
- Weight: 71 kg (157 lb)

Cycling career
- Sport: Cycling
- Disciplines: Track, road
Medal record
Representing Switzerland
Men's track cycling
Olympic Games
Bronze medal – third place	1968 Mexico City	Individual pursuit
Silver medal – second place	1972 Munich	Individual pursuit
World Championships
Silver medal – second place	1968 Roms	Individual pursuit
Gold medal – first place	1969 Antwerp	Individual pursuit
Gold medal – first place	1970 Leicester	Individual pursuit
Men's road cycling
World Championships
Bronze medal – third place	1969 Zolder	Team time trial

Xaver Kurmann (born 29 August 1948) is a retired Swiss amateur cyclist. Had his best results in the individual pursuit event on track, winning two world titles and two Olympic medals between 1968 and 1972, but he also won a bronze medal in the 100 km team time trial at the 1969 UCI Road World Championships.
