= Giacomo Bazzan =

Italian cyclist (1950–2019)

Personal information
- Born: 13 January 1950 Vescovana, Italy
- Died: 25 December 2019 (aged 69)

Cycling career
- Sport: Cycling

Giacomo Bazzan (13 January 1950 – 25 December 2019) was an Italian cyclist. He competed in the team pursuit event at the 1972 Summer Olympics.
