= UCI Track Cycling World Championships – Women's individual pursuit =

The UCI Track Cycling World Championships – Women's individual pursuit is the world championship individual pursuit event held annually at the UCI Track Cycling World Championships. Rebecca Twigg of the United States, and Tamara Garkuchina of the Soviet Union are the most successful cyclists in the history of this event, with six world titles apiece. Beryl Burton, with twelve medals including five world titles, is the most decorated cyclist in the event.

== Medalists ==
Championships	Winner	Runner-up	Third
1958 Paris	Ludmilla Kotchetova (URS)	Stella Bail (GBR)	Kathleen Ray (GBR)
1959 Amsterdam	Beryl Burton (GBR)	Elsy Jacobs (LUX)	Lyubov Kozhetova (URS)
1960 Leipzig	Beryl Burton (GBR)	Marie-Therese Naessens (BEL)	Lyubov Zhogina (URS)
1961 Zürich	Yvonne Reynders (BEL)	Beryl Burton (GBR)	Marie-Therese Naessens (BEL)
1962 Milan	Beryl Burton (GBR)	Yvonne Reynders (BEL)	Lidiya Tichomirova (URS)
1963 Rocourt	Beryl Burton (GBR)	Yvonne Reynders (BEL)	Lyubov Kozhetova (URS)
1964 Paris	Yvonne Reynders (BEL)	Beryl Burton (GBR)	Aino Puronen (URS)
1965 San Sebastián	Yvonne Reynders (BEL)	Hannelore Mattig (GDR)	Aino Puronen (URS)
1966 Frankfurt	Beryl Burton (GBR)	Yvonne Reynders (BEL)	Hannelore Mattig (GDR)
1967 Amsterdam	Tamara Garkuchina (URS)	Raisa Obodovskaya (URS)	Beryl Burton (GBR)
1968 Rome	Raisa Obodovskaya (URS)	Beryl Burton (GBR)	Keetie van Oosten-Hage (NED)
1969 Antwerp	Raisa Obodovskaya (URS)	Tamara Garkuchina (URS)	Keetie van Oosten-Hage (NED)
1970 Leicester	Tamara Garkuchina (URS)	Raisa Obodovskaya (URS)	Beryl Burton (GBR)
1971 Varese	Tamara Garkuchina (URS)	Keetie van Oosten-Hage (NED)	Iva Zajíčková (TCH)
1972 Marseille	Tamara Garkuchina (URS)	Keetie van Oosten-Hage (NED)	Lyubov Sadoroynaya (URS)
1973 San Sebastián	Tamara Garkuchina (URS)	Keetie van Oosten-Hage (NED)	Beryl Burton (GBR)
1974 Montreal	Tamara Garkuchina (URS)	Martina Smirnova (URS)	Keetie van Oosten-Hage (NED)
1975 Rocourt	Keetie van Oosten-Hage (NED)	Mary Jane Reoch (USA)	Denise Burton (GBR)
1976 Monteroni di Lecce	Keetie van Oosten-Hage (NED)	Luigina Bissoli (ITA)	Mary Jane Reoch (USA)
1977 San Cristóbal	Vera Kuznezova (URS)	Anne Riemersma (NED)	Karen Strong (CAN)
1978 Munich	Keetie van Oosten-Hage (NED)	Anne Riemersma (NED)	Luigina Bissoli (ITA)
1979 Amsterdam	Keetie van Oosten-Hage (NED)	Anne Riemersma (NED)	Luigina Bissoli (ITA)
1980 Besançon	Nadezhda Kibardina (URS)	Karen Strong (CAN)	Petra de Bruin (NED)
1981 Brno	Nadezhda Kibardina (URS)	Tamara Polyakova (URS)	Jeannie Longo (FRA)
1982 Leicester	Rebecca Twigg (USA)	Connie Carpenter (USA)	Jeannie Longo (FRA)
1983 Zürich	Connie Carpenter (USA)	Cynthia Olavarri (USA)	Jeannie Longo (FRA)
1984 Barcelona	Rebecca Twigg (USA)	Jeannie Longo (FRA)	Rossella Galbiati (ITA)
1985 Bassano del Grappa	Rebecca Twigg (USA)	Jeannie Longo (FRA)	Margaret Maas (USA)
1986 Colorado Springs	Jeannie Longo (FRA)	Rebecca Twigg (USA)	Barbara Ganz (SUI)
1987 Vienna	Rebecca Twigg (USA)	Jeannie Longo (FRA)	Mindee Mayfield (USA)
1988 Ghent	Jeannie Longo (FRA)	Barbara Ganz (SUI)	Mindee Mayfield (USA)
1989 Lyon	Jeannie Longo (FRA)	Petra Rossner (GDR)	Barbara Ganz (SUI)
1990 Maebashi	Leontien van Moorsel (NED)	Madonna Harris (NZL)	Barbara Ganz (SUI)
1991 Stuttgart	Petra Rossner (GER)	Janie Eickhoff (USA)	Marion Clignet (FRA)
1992 Valencia	Not held		
1993 Hamar	Rebecca Twigg (USA)	Marion Clignet (FRA)	Janie Eickhoff (USA)
1994 Palermo	Marion Clignet (FRA)	Svetlana Samochvalova (RUS)	Janie Eickhoff (USA)
1995 Bogotá	Rebecca Twigg (USA)	Antonella Bellutti (ITA)	May Britt Hartwell (NOR)
1996 Manchester	Marion Clignet (FRA)	Lucy Tyler (AUS)	Antonella Bellutti (ITA)
1997 Perth	Judith Arndt (GER)	Natalya Karimova (RUS)	Yvonne McGregor (GBR)
1998 Bordeaux	Lucy Tyler-Sharman (AUS)	Leontien Zijlaard-van Moorsel (NED)	Judith Arndt (GER)
1999 Berlin	Marion Clignet (FRA)	Judith Arndt (GER)	Rasa Mažeikytė (LTU)
2000 Manchester	Yvonne McGregor (GBR)	Judith Arndt (GER)	Yelena Chalykh (RUS)
2001 Antwerp	Leontien Zijlaard-van Moorsel (NED)	Olga Slyusareva (RUS)	Yelena Chalykh (RUS)
2002 Ballerup	Leontien Zijlaard-van Moorsel (NED)	Olga Slyusareva (RUS)	Katherine Bates (AUS)
2003 Stuttgart	Leontien Zijlaard-van Moorsel (NED)	Katie Mactier (AUS)	Olga Slyusareva (RUS)
2004 Melbourne	Sarah Ulmer (NZL)	Katie Mactier (AUS)	Yelena Chalykh (RUS)
2005 Los Angeles	Katie Mactier (AUS)	Katherine Bates (AUS)	Karin Thürig (SUI)
2006 Bordeaux	Sarah Hammer (USA)	Olga Slyusareva (RUS)	Katie Mactier (AUS)
2007 Palma de Mallorca	Sarah Hammer (USA)	Rebecca Romero (GBR)	Katie Mactier (AUS)
2008 Manchester	Rebecca Romero (GBR)	Sarah Hammer (USA)	Katie Mactier (AUS)
2009 Pruszków	Alison Shanks (NZL)	Wendy Houvenaghel (GBR)	Vilija Sereikaitė (LTU)
2010 Ballerup	Sarah Hammer (USA)	Wendy Houvenaghel (GBR)	Vilija Sereikaitė (LTU)
2011 Apeldoorn	Sarah Hammer (USA)	Alison Shanks (NZL)	Vilija Sereikaitė (LTU)
2012 Melbourne	Alison Shanks (NZL)	Wendy Houvenaghel (GBR)	Ashlee Ankudinoff (AUS)
2013 Minsk	Sarah Hammer (USA)	Amy Cure (AUS)	Annette Edmondson (AUS)
2014 Cali	Joanna Rowsell (GBR)	Sarah Hammer (USA)	Amy Cure (AUS)
2015 Yvelines	Rebecca Wiasak (AUS)	Jennifer Valente (USA)	Amy Cure (AUS)
2016 London	Rebecca Wiasak (AUS)	Małgorzata Wojtyra (POL)	Annie Foreman-Mackey (CAN)
2017 Hong Kong	Chloé Dygert (USA)	Ashlee Ankudinoff (AUS)	Kelly Catlin (USA)
2018 Apeldoorn	Chloé Dygert (USA)	Annemiek van Vleuten (NED)	Kelly Catlin (USA)
2019 Pruszków	Ashlee Ankudinoff (AUS)	Lisa Brennauer (GER)	Lisa Klein (GER)
2020 Berlin	Chloé Dygert Owen (USA)	Lisa Brennauer (GER)	Franziska Brauße (GER)
2021 Roubaix	Lisa Brennauer (GER)	Franziska Brauße (GER)	Mieke Kröger (GER)
2022 Saint-Quentin-en-Yvelines	Franziska Brauße (GER)	Bryony Botha (NZL)	Josie Knight (GBR)
2023 Glasgow	Chloé Dygert (USA)	Franziska Brauße (GER)	Bryony Botha (NZL)
2024 Ballerup	Anna Morris (GBR)	Chloé Dygert (USA)	Bryony Botha (NZL)
2025 Santiago	Anna Morris (GBR)	Josie Knight (GBR)	Chloé Dygert (USA)
2026 Shanghai	Millie Couzens (GBR)	Josie Knight (GBR)	Lisa Klein (GER)

== Medal table ==
Rank	Nation	Gold	Silver	Bronze	Total
1	United States	16	9	9	34
2	Soviet Union	12	5	7	24
3	Great Britain	11	10	7	28
4	Netherlands	8	8	4	20
5	France	6	4	4	14
6	Australia	5	6	8	19
7	Germany	4	6	5	15
8	Belgium	3	4	1	8
9	New Zealand	3	3	2	8
10	Russia	0	5	4	9
11	Italy	0	2	4	6
12	East Germany	0	2	1	3
13	Switzerland	0	1	4	5
14	Canada	0	1	2	3
15	Luxembourg	0	1	0	1
15	Poland	0	1	0	1
17	Lithuania	0	0	4	4
18	Czechoslovakia	0	0	1	1
18	Norway	0	0	1	1
Totals (19 entries)		68	68	68	204
