= 1960 UCI Track Cycling World Championships =

- Venue: Leipzig and Chemnitz, East Germany
- Date: 3–14 August 1960
- Velodrome: Alfred-Rosch-Kampfbahn; Chemnitz Velodrome
- Events: 8

The 1960 UCI Track Cycling World Championships were the World Championship for track cycling. They took place in Leipzig and Chemnitz, East Germany from 3 to 14 August 1960. Eight events were contested, 6 for men (3 for professionals, 3 for amateurs) and 2 for women.

In the same period, the 1960 UCI Road World Championships were organized on the Sachsenring and in Leipzig for the women's race, East Germany.

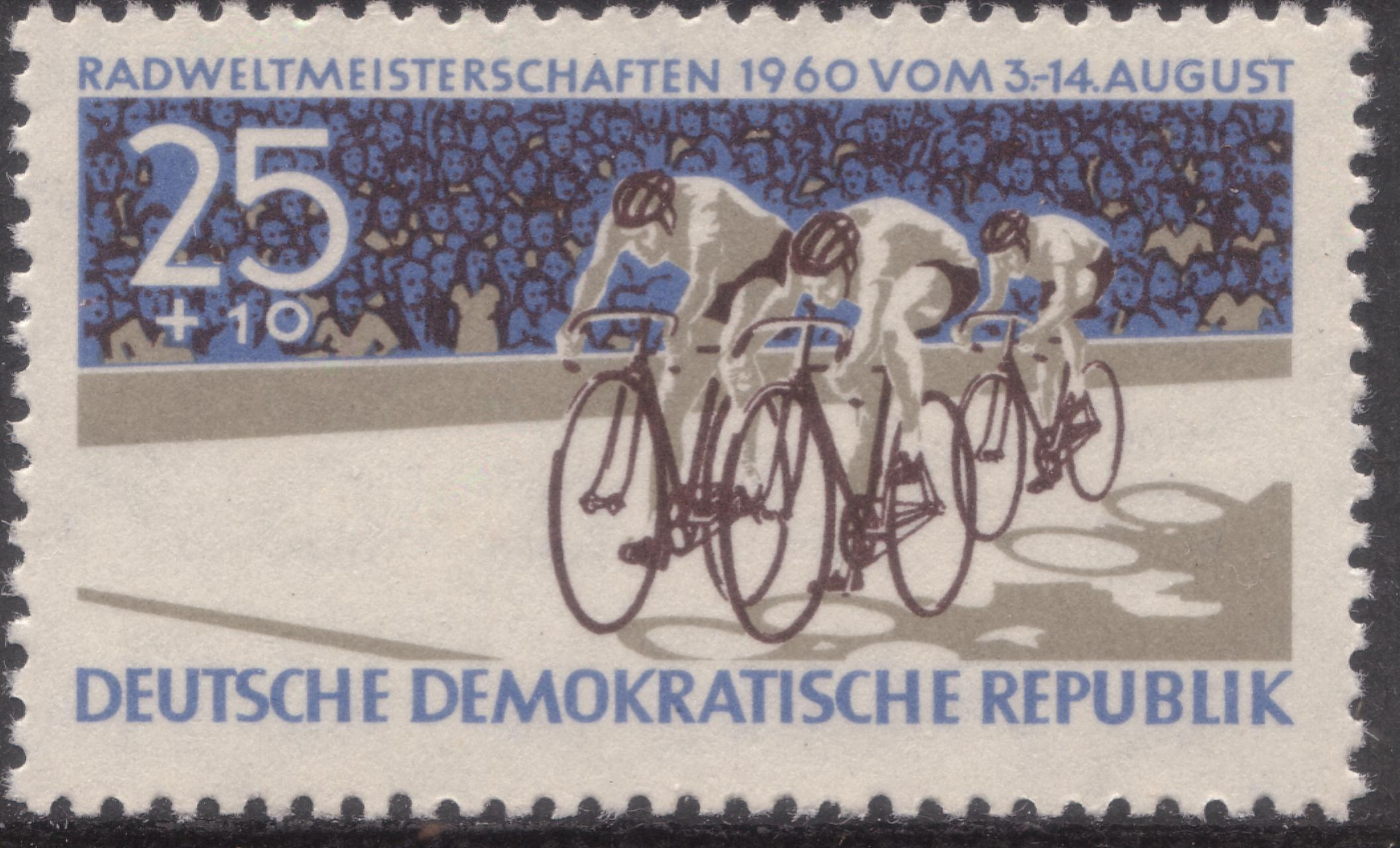
Official stamp of the championships

== Medal summary ==
Event	Gold	Silver	Bronze
Men's Professional Events
Men's sprint	Antonio Maspes; Italy	Oscar Plattner; Switzerland	Jos De Bakker; Belgium
Men's individual pursuit	Rudi Altig; West Germany	Willy Trepp; Switzerland	Ercole Baldini; Italy
Men's motor-paced	Guillermo Timoner; Spain	Martin Wierstra; Netherlands	Norbert Koch; Netherlands
Men's Amateur Events
Men's sprint	Sante Gaiardoni; Italy	Leo Sterckx; Belgium	David Handley; Great Britain
Men's individual pursuit	Marcel Delattre; France	Henk Nijdam; Netherlands	Siegfried Köhler; East Germany
Men's motor-paced	Georg Stoltze; East Germany	Siegfried Wustrow; East Germany	Henk Buis; Netherlands
Women's Events
Women's sprint	Galina Ermolaeva; Soviet Union	Valentina Maksimova; Soviet Union	Jean Dunn; Great Britain
Women's individual pursuit	Beryl Burton; Great Britain	Marie-Thérèse Naessens; Belgium	Lyubov Shogina; Soviet Union

== Medal table ==
Rank	Nation	Gold	Silver	Bronze	Total
1	Italy (ITA)	2	0	1	3
2	East Germany (RDA)	1	1	1	3
2	Soviet Union (URS)	1	1	1	3
4	Great Britain (GBR)	1	0	2	3
5	France (FRA)	1	0	0	1
5	Spain (ESP)	1	0	0	1
5	West Germany (FRG)	1	0	0	1
8	Netherlands (NED)	0	2	2	4
9	Belgium (BEL)	0	2	1	3
10	Switzerland (SUI)	0	2	0	2
Totals (10 entries)		8	8	8	24

== See also ==
- 1960 UCI Road World Championships
