= 1962 UCI Track Cycling World Championships =

- Venue: Milan, Italy
- Date: 24–28 August 1962
- Velodrome: Velodromo Vigorelli
- Events: 9

The 1962 UCI Track Cycling World Championships were the World Championship for track cycling. They took place in Milan, Italy from 24 to 28 August 1962. Nine events were contested, 7 for men (3 for professionals, 4 for amateurs) and 2 for women.

In the same period, the 1962 UCI Road World Championships were organized in Salò, Italy.

== Medal summary ==
Event	Gold	Silver	Bronze
Men's Professional Events
Men's sprint	Antonio Maspes; Italy	Sante Gaiardoni; Italy	Oscar Plattner; Switzerland
Men's individual pursuit	Henk Nijdam; Netherlands	Leandro Faggin; Italy	Peter Post; Netherlands
Men's motor-paced	Guillermo Timoner; Spain	Paul Depaepe; Belgium	Leo Wickihalder; Switzerland
Men's Amateur Events
Men's sprint	Sergio Bianchetto; Italy	Giuseppe Beghetto; Italy	Pierre Trentin; France
Men's individual pursuit	Kaj Jensen; Denmark	Herman Van Loo; Belgium	Jaap Oudkerk; Netherlands
Men's team pursuit	West Germany; Ehrenfried Rudolph; Bernd Rohr; Klaus May; Lothar Claesges	Denmark; Bent Hansen; Preben Isaksson; Kaj E. Jensen; Kurt Vid Stein	Soviet Union; Arnold Belgardt; Leonid Kolumbet; Stanislav Moskvin; Viktor Romanov
Men's motor-paced	Romain De Loof; Belgium	Hans Lauppi; Switzerland	Christian Giscos; France
Women's Events
Women's sprint	Valentina Savina; Soviet Union	Irina Kirichenko; Soviet Union	Jean Dunn; Great Britain
Women's individual pursuit	Beryl Burton; Great Britain	Yvonne Reynders; Belgium	Lidiya Tikhomirova; Soviet Union

== Medal table ==
Rank	Nation	Gold	Silver	Bronze	Total
1	Italy (ITA)	2	3	0	5
2	Belgium (BEL)	1	3	0	4
3	Soviet Union (URS)	1	1	2	4
4	Denmark (DEN)	1	1	0	2
5	Netherlands (NED)	1	0	2	3
6	Great Britain (GBR)	1	0	1	2
7	Spain (ESP)	1	0	0	1
7	West Germany (FRG)	1	0	0	1
9	Switzerland (SUI)	0	1	2	3
10	France (FRA)	0	0	2	2
Totals (10 entries)		9	9	9	27

== See also ==
- 1962 UCI Road World Championships
