= 1959 UCI Track Cycling World Championships =

- Venue: Amsterdam, Netherlands
- Date: 8–13 August 1959
- Velodrome: Olympisch Stadion
- Events: 8

The 1959 UCI Track Cycling World Championships were the World Championship for track cycling. They took place in Amsterdam, Netherlands from 8 to 13 August 1959. Eight events were contested, 6 for men (3 for professionals, 3 for amateurs) and 2 for women.

In the same period, the 1959 UCI Road World Championships were organized in Zandvoort, Netherlands.

== Medal summary ==
Event	Gold	Silver	Bronze
Men's Professional Events
Men's sprint	Antonio Maspes; Italy	Michel Rousseau; France	Jan Derksen; Netherlands
Men's individual pursuit	Roger Rivière; France	Albert Bouvet; France	Jean Brankart; Belgium
Men's motor-paced	Guillermo Timoner; Spain	Walter Bucher; Switzerland	Norbert Koch; Netherlands
Men's Amateur Events
Men's sprint	Valentino Gasparella; Italy	Sante Gaiardoni; Italy	André Gruchet; France
Men's individual pursuit	Rudi Altig; West Germany	Mario Vallotto; Italy	Willy Trepp; Switzerland
Men's motor-paced	Arie van Houwelingen; Netherlands	Bernard Deconinck; France	Lothar Meister; East Germany
Women's Events
Women's sprint	Galina Ermolaeva; Soviet Union	Valentina Maksimova; Soviet Union	Jean Dunn; Great Britain
Women's individual pursuit	Beryl Burton; Great Britain	Elsy Jacobs; Luxembourg	Lyudmilla Kochetova; Soviet Union

== Medal table ==
Rank	Nation	Gold	Silver	Bronze	Total
1	Italy (ITA)	2	2	0	4
2	France (FRA)	1	3	1	5
3	Soviet Union (URS)	1	1	1	3
4	Netherlands (NED)	1	0	2	3
5	Great Britain (GBR)	1	0	1	2
6	Spain (ESP)	1	0	0	1
6	West Germany (FRG)	1	0	0	1
8	Switzerland (SUI)	0	1	1	2
9	Luxembourg (LUX)	0	1	0	1
10	Belgium (BEL)	0	0	1	1
10	East Germany (GDR)	0	0	1	1
Totals (11 entries)		8	8	8	24

== See also ==
- 1959 UCI Road World Championships
