= 1958 UCI Track Cycling World Championships =

- Venue: Paris, France
- Date: 2–7 September 1958
- Velodrome: Parc des Princes
- Events: 8

The 1958 UCI Track Cycling World Championships were the World Championship for track cycling. They took place in Paris, France from 8 to 13 September 1958. Eight events were contested, 6 for men (3 for professionals, 3 for amateurs) and 2 for women.

In the same period, the 1958 UCI Road World Championships were organized in the Reims, France.

== Medal summary ==
Event	Gold	Silver	Bronze
Men's Professional Events
Men's sprint	Michel Rousseau; France	Enzo Sacchi; Italy	Antonio Maspes; Italy
Men's individual pursuit	Roger Rivière; France	Leandro Faggin; Italy	Franco Gandini; Italy
Men's motor-paced	Walter Bucher; Switzerland	Guillermo Timoner; Spain	Wouter Wagtmans; Netherlands
Men's Amateur Events
Men's sprint	Valentino Gasparella; Italy	Sante Gaiardoni; Italy	Dick Ploog; Australia
Men's individual pursuit	Norman Sheil; Great Britain	Philippe Gaudrillet; France	Carlo Simonigh; Italy
Men's motor-paced	Lothar Meister; East Germany	Heinz Wahl; East Germany	Arie Van Houwelingen; Netherlands
Women's Events
Women's sprint	Galina Ermolaeva; Soviet Union	Valentina Maksimova; Soviet Union	Jean Dunn; Great Britain
Women's individual pursuit	Lyudmila Kochetova; Soviet Union	Stella Bail; Great Britain	Kathleen Ray; Great Britain

== Medal table ==
Rank	Nation	Gold	Silver	Bronze	Total
1	France (FRA)	2	1	0	3
1	Soviet Union (URS)	2	1	0	3
3	Italy (ITA)	1	3	3	7
4	Great Britain (GBR)	1	1	2	4
5	East Germany (GDR)	1	1	0	2
6	Switzerland (SUI)	1	0	0	1
7	Spain (ESP)	0	1	0	1
8	Netherlands (NED)	0	0	2	2
9	Australia (AUS)	0	0	1	1
Totals (9 entries)		8	8	8	24

== See also ==
- 1958 UCI Road World Championships
