= 1961 UCI Track Cycling World Championships =

- Venue: Zurich, Switzerland
- Date: 27 August - 13 September 1961
- Velodrome: Oerlikon Velodrome
- Events: 8

The 1961 UCI Track Cycling World Championships were the World Championship for track cycling. They took place in Zurich, Switzerland from 27 August to 1 September 1961. Eight events were contested, 6 for men (3 for professionals, 3 for amateurs) and 2 for women.

In the same period, the 1961 UCI Road World Championships were organized in Bern, Switzerland.

== Medal summary ==
Event	Gold	Silver	Bronze
Men's Professional Events
Men's sprint	Antonio Maspes; Italy	Michel Rousseau; France	Jos De Bakker; Belgium
Men's individual pursuit	Rudi Altig; West Germany	Willy Trepp; Switzerland	Leandro Faggin; Italy
Men's motor-paced	Karl-Heinz Marsell; West Germany	Paul Depaepe; Belgium	Max Meier; Switzerland
Men's Amateur Events
Men's sprint	Sergio Bianchetto; Italy	Giuseppe Beghetto; Italy	Ron Baensch; Australia
Men's individual pursuit	Henk Nijdam; Netherlands	Jacob Oudkerk; Netherlands	Marcel Delattre; France
Men's motor-paced	Leendert Van der Meulen; Netherlands	Siegfried Wustrow; East Germany	Georg Stoltze; East Germany
Women's Events
Women's sprint	Galina Ermolaeva; Soviet Union	Valentina Maksimova; Soviet Union	Jean Dunn; Great Britain
Women's individual pursuit	Yvonne Reynders; Belgium	Beryl Burton; Great Britain	Marie-Thérèse Naessens; Belgium

== Medal table ==
Rank	Nation	Gold	Silver	Bronze	Total
1	Italy (ITA)	2	1	1	4
2	Netherlands (NED)	2	1	0	3
2	West Germany (FRG)	2	1	0	3
4	Belgium (BEL)	1	1	2	4
5	Soviet Union (URS)	1	1	0	2
6	East Germany (RDA)	0	1	1	2
6	France (FRA)	0	1	1	2
6	Great Britain (GBR)	0	1	1	2
6	Switzerland (SUI)	0	1	1	2
10	Australia (AUS)	0	0	1	1
Totals (10 entries)		8	9	8	25

== See also ==
- 1961 UCI Road World Championships
