= Marie-Rose Gaillard =

Belgian cyclist (1944–2022)

- Gaillard in 1962 with the rainbow jersey

Personal information
- Full name: Marie-Rose Gaillard
- Born: 19 August 1944 Liège, Belgium
- Died: 18 June 2022 (aged 77)

Cycling career
- Sport: Cycling
- Role: Rider

Major wins
- One-day races and Classics World Road Race Championship (1962) National Road Race Championships (1966)
Medal record
Representing Belgium
Gold medal – first place	1962 Salò	Road race

Marie-Rose Gaillard (19 August 1944 – 18 June 2022) was a Belgian racing cyclist. She won the Belgian national road race title in 1966.

== Biography ==
Marie-Rose Gaillard began cycling in 1960, after being encouraged to do so by a cycle dealer who saw her riding the bike she had borrowed from her brother. She signed up for the Royal Dolhain Vélo and competed in her first race in Visé. The following year, she was selected for the Belgian team for her first world championship, at Douglas.

She was world road champion in 1962 at the age of 18, in Salò ahead of two of her compatriots Yvonne Reynders, title holder, and Marie-Thérèse Naessens. She competed in four other world championships. Gaillard was tenth in 1963, fourth in 1964, nineteenth in 1965, eighth in 1966. In 1966, she won the Belgian road championship.

Marie-Rose Gaillard co-founded the Ourthe-Amblève Vélo club, of which her nephew Philippe Gilbert was a member.

== Career achievements ==
=== Major results ===
1962
1st UCI World Championships Road race
1963
10th UCI World Championships Road race
1964
4th UCI World Championships Road race
1966
1st National Championships Road race
8th UCI World Championships Road race
