= 1972 UCI Track Cycling World Championships =

- Venue: Marseille, France
- Date: 1972
- Velodrome: Stade Vélodrome
- Events: 6

The 1972 UCI Track Cycling World Championships were the World Championship for track cycling. They took place in Marseille, France, in 1972. Due to the 1972 Summer Olympics only six events were contested, 4 for men (3 for professionals, 1 for amateurs) and 2 for women.

In the same period, the 1972 UCI Road World Championships were organized in Gap.

== Medal summary ==
Event	Gold	Silver	Bronze
Men's Professional Events
Men's sprint	Robert Van Lancker; Belgium	Gordon Johnson; Australia	Giordano Turrini; Italy
Men's individual pursuit	Hugh Porter; Great Britain	Ferdinand Bracke; Belgium	Dirk Baert; Belgium
Men's motor-paced	Theo Verschueren; Belgium	Cees Stam; Netherlands	Dieter Kemper; West Germany
Men's Amateur Events
Men's motor-paced	Horst Gnas; West Germany	Jean Breuer; West Germany	Gaby Minneboo; Netherlands
Women's Events
Women's sprint	Galina Ermolaeva; Soviet Union	Wilhelmina Brinkhof; Netherlands	Sheila Young; United States
Women's individual pursuit	Tamara Garkuchina; Soviet Union	Keetie Hage; Netherlands	Lyubov Zadorojnala; Soviet Union

== Medal table ==
Rank	Nation	Gold	Silver	Bronze	Total
1	Belgium (BEL)	2	1	1	4
2	Soviet Union (URS)	2	0	1	3
3	West Germany (FRG)	1	1	1	3
4	Great Britain (GBR)	1	0	0	1
5	Netherlands (NED)	0	3	1	4
6	Australia (AUS)	0	1	0	1
7	Italy (ITA)	0	0	1	1
7	United States (USA)	0	0	1	1
Totals (8 entries)		6	6	6	18

== See also ==
- 1972 UCI Road World Championships
