= World record progression track cycling – Women's flying 200 m time trial =

This is an overview of the progression of the World track cycling record of the women's flying 200 m time trial as recognised by the Union Cycliste Internationale.

== Progression ==
=== Amateurs (1955–1990) ===
| Time | Cyclist | Location | Track | Date |
|---|---|---|---|---|
| 14"20 | Daisy Franks (GBR) | London (GBR), Herne Hill | Open air | 15 June 1955 |
| 12"30 | Liubov Razouvaeva (URS) | Irkoutsk (URS), St. Dynamo | Open air | 17 July 1955 |
| 13"20 | Karla Gunter (RDA) | Berlin (RFA), Hallenstadion | Indoor | 7 March 1964 |
| 13"178 | Luigina Bissoli (ITA) | Milan (ITA), Palais Des Sports | Indoor | 6 December 1978 |
| 12"685 | Rossella Galbiati (ITA) | Milan (ITA), Palais Des Sports | Indoor | 15 November 1979 |
| 12"163 | Galina Tsareva (URS) | Moscow (URS) | Indoor | 18 January 1980 |
| 12"135 | Galina Tsareva (URS) | Moscow (URS) | Indoor | 25 April 1980 |
| 11"914 | Galina Tsareva (URS) | Moscow (URS) | Indoor | 11 June 1980 |
| 11"753 | Natalia Krouchelnitskaya (URS) | Tbilissi (URS) | Open air | 14 September 1980 |
| 11"547 | Natalia Krouchelnitskaya (URS) | Moscow (URS) | Indoor | 22 April 1982 |
| 11"494 | Erika Salumäe (URS) | Moscow (URS) | Indoor | 14 May 1985 |
| 11"393 | Connie Paraskevin (USA) | Colorado Springs (USA) | Open air | 6 July 1985 |
| 11"489 | Erika Salumäe (URS) | Moscow (URS) | Indoor | 8 July 1986 |
| 11"383 | Isabelle Gautheron (FRA) | Colorado Springs (USA) | Open air | 16 August 1986 |
| 11"373 | Erika Salumäe (URS) | Moscow (URS) | Indoor | 27 May 1987 |
| 11"361 | Galina Tsareva (URS) | Moscow (URS) | Indoor | 8 July 1987 |
| 11"232 | Erika Salumäe (URS) | Moscow (URS) | Indoor | 2 August 1987 |
| 11"210 | Erika Salumäe (URS) | Moscow (URS) | Indoor | 24 August 1988 |
| 11"170 | Erika Salumäe (URS) | Moscow (URS) | Indoor | 1 August 1989 |
| 11"164 | Galina Enukhina (URS) | Moscow (URS) | Indoor | 6 August 1990 |

=== Open (from 1992) ===
| Time | Cyclist | Location | Track | Date | Meet | Ref |
|---|---|---|---|---|---|---|
| 11.101 | Galina Enukhina (RUS) | Moscow (RUS) | Indoor | 4 July 1992 | | |
| 10.831 | Olga Slioussareva (RUS) | Moscow (RUS) | Indoor | 25 April 1993 | | |
| 10.793 | Simona Krupeckaitė (LTU) | Moscow (RUS) | Indoor | 29 May 2010 | | |
| 10.793 | Olga Panarina (BLR) | Astana (KAZ) | Indoor | 5 November 2011 | | |
| 10.782 | Anna Meares (AUS) | Melbourne (AUS) | Indoor | 5 April 2012 | | |
| 10.643 | Miriam Welte (GER) | Colorado Springs (USA) | Indoor | 22 June 2012 | | |
| 10.573 | Tianshi Zhong (CHN) | Aguascalientes (MEX) | Indoor | 18 January 2013 | | |
| 10.384 | Kristina Vogel (GER) | Aguascalientes (MEX) | Indoor | 7 December 2013 | World Cup | |
| 10.154 | Kelsey Mitchell (CAN) | Cochabamba, (BOL) | Indoor | 5 September 2019 | Pan American Championships | |
| 10.108 | Ellesse Andrews (NZL) | Saint-Quentin-en-Yvelines, (FRA) | Indoor | 9 August 2024 | Olympic Games | |
| 10.029 | Lea Friedrich (GER) | Saint-Quentin-en-Yvelines, (FRA) | Indoor | 9 August 2024 | Olympic Games | |
| 9.976 | Yuan Liying (CHN) | Konya (TUR) | Indoor | 15 March 2025 | Nations Cup | |
| 9.759 | Emma Finucane (GBR) | Konya (TUR) | Indoor | 2 February 2026 | European Championships | |
