= UCI Track Cycling World Championships – Women's sprint =

The UCI Track Cycling World Championships – Women's sprint is the world championship sprint event held annually at the UCI Track Cycling World Championships. First held in 1958, the event was dominated until 1980 by Soviet cyclists. From 2000, the event came under German, French and British sway. Galina Yermolayeva and Galina Tsareva of the Soviet Union, and Victoria Pendleton of Great Britain have each won this event on six occasions, the most by any cyclist. French sprinter Félicia Ballanger's five successive victories is the most consecutive titles by an athlete.

== Medalists ==
Championships	Winner	Runner-up	Third
1958 Paris	Galina Yermolayeva; Soviet Union	Valentina Maksimova; Soviet Union	Jean Dunn; Great Britain
1959 Amsterdam	Galina Yermolayeva; Soviet Union	Valentina Maksimova; Soviet Union	Jean Dunn; Great Britain
1960 Leipzig	Galina Yermolayeva; Soviet Union	Valentina Maksimova; Soviet Union	Jean Dunn; Great Britain
1961 Zürich	Galina Yermolayeva; Soviet Union	Valentina Maksimova; Soviet Union	Jean Dunn; Great Britain
1962 Milan	Valentina Savina; Soviet Union	Irina Kirichenko; Soviet Union	Jean Dunn; Great Britain
1963 Rocourt	Galina Yermolayeva; Soviet Union	Irina Kirichenko; Soviet Union	Valentina Savina; Soviet Union
1964 Paris	Irina Kirichenko; Soviet Union	Galina Yermolayeva; Soviet Union	Gisèle Caille; France
1965 San Sebastián	Valentina Savina; Soviet Union	Galina Yermolayeva; Soviet Union	Karin Stüwe; East Germany
1966 Frankfurt	Irina Kirichenko; Soviet Union	Valentina Savina; Soviet Union	Heidi Blobner; East Germany
1967 Amsterdam	Valentina Savina; Soviet Union	Irina Kirichenko; Soviet Union	Galina Yermolayeva; Soviet Union
1968 Rome	Alla Bagiyanz; Soviet Union	Irina Kirichenko; Soviet Union	Galina Yermolayeva; Soviet Union
1969 Antwerp	Galina Tsareva; Soviet Union	Galina Yermolayeva; Soviet Union	Irina Kirichenko; Soviet Union
1970 Leicester	Galina Tsareva; Soviet Union	Galina Yermolayeva; Soviet Union	Valentina Savina; Soviet Union
1971 Varese	Galina Tsareva; Soviet Union	Galina Yermolayeva; Soviet Union	Iva Zajícková; Czech Republic
1972 Marseille	Galina Yermolayeva; Soviet Union	Wilhelmina Brinkhoff; Netherlands	Sheila Young; United States
1973 San Sebastián	Sheila Young; United States	Iva Zajícková; Czech Republic	Galina Yermolayeva; Soviet Union
1974 Montreal	Tamara Piltsikova; Soviet Union	Sue Novara; United States	Galina Tsareva; Soviet Union
1975 Rocourt	Sue Novara; United States	Iva Zajícková; Czech Republic	Sheila Young; United States
1976 Monteroni di Lecce	Sheila Young; United States	Sue Novara; United States	Iva Zajícková; Czech Republic
1977 San Cristóbal	Galina Tsareva; Soviet Union	Sue Novara; United States	Iva Zajícková; Czech Republic
1978 Munich	Galina Tsareva; Soviet Union	Sue Novara; United States	Iva Zajícková; Czech Republic
1979 Amsterdam	Galina Tsareva; Soviet Union	Truus van der Plaat; Netherlands	Sue Novara; United States
1980 Besançon	Sue Novara; United States	Galina Tsareva; Soviet Union	Claudia Lommatzsch; West Germany
1981 Brno	Sheila Young; United States	Claudine Vierstraete; Belgium	Claudia Lommatzsch; West Germany
1982 Leicester	Connie Paraskevin; United States	Sheila Young; United States	Claudia Lommatzsch; West Germany
1983 Zürich	Connie Paraskevin; United States	Claudia Lommatzsch; West Germany	Isabelle Nicoloso; France
1984 Barcelona	Connie Paraskevin; United States	Erika Salumäe; Soviet Union	Zhou Syuine; China
1985 Bassano del Grappa	Isabelle Nicoloso; France	Connie Paraskevin; United States	Natalya Kruchelnitskaya; Soviet Union
1986 Colorado Springs	Christa Rothenburger; East Germany	Erika Salumäe; Soviet Union	Connie Paraskevin; United States
1987 Vienna	Erika Salumäe; Soviet Union	Christa Rothenburger; East Germany	Connie Paraskevin-Young; United States
1988 Ghent	Event not being held		
1989 Lyon	Erika Salumäe; Soviet Union	Galina Yenyuchina; Soviet Union	Isabelle Gautheron; France
1990 Maebashi	Connie Paraskevin-Young; United States	Renee Duprel; United States	Rita Razmaite; Soviet Union
1991 Stuttgart	Ingrid Haringa; Netherlands	Anett Neumann; Germany	Connie Paraskevin-Young; United States
1992 Valencia	Event not being held		
1993 Hamar	Tanya Dubnicoff; Canada	Ingrid Haringa; Netherlands	Nathalie Even; France
1994 Palermo	Galina Yenyuchina; Russia	Félicia Ballanger; France	Oksana Grishina; Russia
1995 Bogotá	Félicia Ballanger; France	Olga Slioussareva; Russia	Erika Salumäe; Estonia
1996 Manchester	Félicia Ballanger; France	Anett Neumann; Germany	Magali Faure; France
1997 Perth	Félicia Ballanger; France	Michelle Ferris; Australia	Oksana Grishina; Russia
1998 Bordeaux	Félicia Ballanger; France	Michelle Ferris; Australia	Tanya Dubnicoff; Canada
1999 Berlin	Félicia Ballanger; France	Michelle Ferris; Australia	Tanya Dubnicoff; Canada
2000 Manchester	Natalya Markovnichenko; Belarus	Lori-Ann Muenzer; Canada	Katrin Meinke; Germany
2001 Antwerp	Svetlana Grankovskaya; Russia	Tammy Thomas; United States	Lori-Ann Muenzer; Canada
2002 Ballerup	Natalya Tsylinskaya; Belarus	Kerrie Meares; Australia	Katrin Meinke; Germany
2003 Stuttgart	Svetlana Grankovskaya; Russia	Natalya Tsylinskaya; Belarus	Nancy Contreras; Mexico
2004 Melbourne	Svetlana Grankovskaya; Russia	Anna Meares; Australia	Lori-Ann Muenzer; Canada
2005 Los Angeles	Victoria Pendleton; Great Britain	Tamilla Abassova; Russia	Anna Meares; Australia
2006 Bordeaux	Natalya Tsylinskaya; Belarus	Victoria Pendleton; Great Britain	Guo Shuang; China
2007 Palma de Mallorca	Victoria Pendleton; Great Britain	Guo Shuang; China	Anna Meares; Australia
2008 Manchester	Victoria Pendleton; Great Britain	Simona Krupeckaitė; Lithuania	Jennie Reed; United States
2009 Pruszków	Victoria Pendleton; Great Britain	Willy Kanis; Netherlands	Simona Krupeckaitė; Lithuania
2010 Ballerup	Victoria Pendleton; Great Britain	Guo Shuang; China	Simona Krupeckaitė; Lithuania
2011 Apeldoorn	Anna Meares; Australia	Simona Krupeckaitė; Lithuania	Victoria Pendleton; Great Britain
2012 Melbourne	Victoria Pendleton; Great Britain	Simona Krupeckaitė; Lithuania	Anna Meares; Australia
2013 Minsk	Becky James; Great Britain	Kristina Vogel; Germany	Lee Wai Sze; Hong Kong
2014 Cali	Kristina Vogel; Germany	Zhong Tianshi; China	Lin Junhong; China
2015 Yvelines	Kristina Vogel; Germany	Elis Ligtlee; Netherlands	Zhong Tianshi; China
2016 London	Zhong Tianshi; China	Lin Junhong; China	Kristina Vogel; Germany
2017 Hong Kong	Kristina Vogel; Germany	Stephanie Morton; Australia	Lee Wai Sze; Hong Kong
2018 Apeldoorn	Kristina Vogel; Germany	Stephanie Morton; Australia	Pauline Grabosch; Germany
2019 Pruszków	Lee Wai Sze; Hong Kong	Stephanie Morton; Australia	Mathilde Gros; France
2020 Berlin	Emma Hinze; Germany	Anastasia Voynova; Russia	Lee Wai Sze; Hong Kong
2021 Roubaix	Emma Hinze; Germany	Lea Friedrich; Germany	Kelsey Mitchell; Canada
2022 Saint-Quentin-en-Yvelines	Mathilde Gros; France	Lea Friedrich; Germany	Emma Hinze; Germany
2023 Glasgow	Emma Finucane; Great Britain	Lea Friedrich; Germany	Ellesse Andrews; New Zealand
2024 Ballerup	Emma Finucane; Great Britain	Hetty van de Wouw; Netherlands	Mina Sato; Japan
2025 Santiago	Hetty van de Wouw; Netherlands	Mina Sato; Japan	Alina Lysenko; Neutral Athlete
2026 Shanghai	Yuan Liying; China	Emma Finucane; Great Britain	Mina Sato; Japan

== Medal table ==
Rank	Nation	Gold	Silver	Bronze	Total
1	Soviet Union	21	18	9	48
2	United States	9	8	7	24
3	Great Britain	9	2	6	17
4	France	7	1	6	14
5	Germany	6	6	5	17
6	Russia	4	3	2	9
7	Belarus	3	1	0	4
8	Netherlands	2	6	0	8
9	China	2	4	4	10
10	Australia	1	8	3	12
11	Canada	1	1	5	7
12	East Germany	1	1	2	4
13	Hong Kong	1	0	3	4
14	Lithuania	0	3	2	5
15	Czech Republic	0	2	4	6
16	West Germany	0	1	3	4
17	Japan	0	1	2	3
18	Belgium	0	1	0	1
19	Estonia	0	0	1	1
19	Individual Neutral Athletes	0	0	1	1
19	Mexico	0	0	1	1
19	New Zealand	0	0	1	1
Totals (22 entries)		67	67	67	201

== See also ==
- UCI Track Cycling World Championships – Women's keirin
- UCI Track Cycling World Championships – Men's sprint
