= 1956 UCI Track Cycling World Championships =

- Venue: Copenhagen, Denmark
- Date: 27 Augustus - 2 September 1956
- Velodrome: Ordrupbanen
- Events: 5

The 1956 UCI Track Cycling World Championships were the World Championship for track cycling. They took place in Copenhagen, Denmark from 27 August to 2 September 1956. Five events for men were contested, 3 for professionals and 2 for amateurs.

Earlier, the 1956 UCI Road World Championships were organized in Copenhagen, from 25 August to 26 August.

== Medal summary ==
Event	Gold	Silver	Bronze
Men's Professional Events
Men's sprint	Antonio Maspes; Italy	Reg Harris; Great Britain	Oscar Plattner; Switzerland
Men's individual pursuit	Guido Messina; Italy	Jacques Anquetil; France	Kay-Werner Nielsen; Denmark
Men's motor-paced	Graham French; Australia	Guillermo Timoner; Spain	Walter Bucher; Switzerland
Men's Amateur Events
Men's sprint	Michel Rousseau; France	Jorge Bátiz; Argentina	Guglielmo Pesenti; Italy
Men's individual pursuit	Ercole Baldini; Italy	Leandro Faggin; Italy	John Geddes; Great Britain

== Medal table ==
Rank	Nation	Gold	Silver	Bronze	Total
1	Italy (ITA)	3	1	1	5
2	France (FRA)	1	1	0	2
3	Australia (AUS)	1	0	0	1
4	Great Britain (GBR)	0	1	1	2
5	Argentina (ARG)	0	1	0	1
5	Spain (ESP)	0	1	0	1
7	Switzerland (SUI)	0	0	2	2
8	Denmark (DEN)	0	0	1	1
Totals (8 entries)		5	5	5	15
