= UCI Track Cycling World Championships – Men's individual pursuit =

The UCI Track Cycling World Championships – Men's individual pursuit is the world championship individual pursuit event held annually at the UCI Track Cycling World Championships. Between its inception and 1992, the men's individual pursuit was separated into two events; one for professionals at 5,000 metres (5,500 yd) and one for amateurs at 4,000 m (4,400 yd). From 1993, all competitors competed in one open event of 4,000 m (4,400 yd). It was first held at the 1939 championships, but had to be abandoned upon the outbreak of World War II, so the first complete competition was at the 1946 championships.

The record number of wins by one rider is six as of 2023, held by Filippo Ganna of Italy.

== Medalists ==
Championships	Winner	Runner-up	Third
1946 Zürich	Gerard Peters; Netherlands	Roger Piel; France	Arne W. Pedersen; Denmark
1947 Paris	Fausto Coppi; Italy	Antonio Bevilacqua; Italy	Hugo Koblet; Switzerland
1948 Amsterdam	Gerrit Schulte; Netherlands	Fausto Coppi; Italy	Antonio Bevilacqua; Italy
1949 Copenhagen	Fausto Coppi; Italy	Lucien Gillen; Luxembourg	Wim van Est; Netherlands
1950 Rocourt	Antonio Bevilacqua; Italy	Wim van Est; Netherlands	Paul Matteoli; France
1951 Milan	Antonio Bevilacqua; Italy	Hugo Koblet; Switzerland	Kay Werner Nielsen; Denmark
1952 Paris	Sid Patterson; Australia	Antonio Bevilacqua; Italy	Lucien Gillen; Luxembourg
1953 Zürich	Sid Patterson; Australia	Kay Werner Nielsen; Denmark	Antonio Bevilacqua; Italy
1954 Cologne	Guido Messina; Italy	Hugo Koblet; Switzerland	Lucien Gillen; Luxembourg
1955 Milan	Guido Messina; Italy	René Strehler; Switzerland	Wim van Est; Netherlands
1956 Copenhagen	Guido Messina; Italy	Jacques Anquetil; France	Kay Werner Nielsen; Denmark
1957 Rocourt	Roger Rivière; France	Albert Bouvet; France	Guido Messina; Italy
1958 Paris	Roger Rivière; France	Leandro Faggin; Italy	Franco Gandini; Italy
1959 Amsterdam	Roger Rivière; France	Albert Bouvet; France	Jean Brankart; Belgium
1960 Leipzig	Rudi Altig; West Germany	Willy Trepp; Switzerland	Ercole Baldini; Italy
1961 Zürich	Rudi Altig; West Germany	Willy Trepp; Switzerland	Leandro Faggin; Italy
1962 Milan	Henk Nijdam; Netherlands	Leandro Faggin; Italy	Peter Post; Netherlands
1963 Rocourt	Leandro Faggin; Italy	Peter Post; Netherlands	Henk Nijdam; Netherlands
1964 Paris	Ferdinand Bracke; Belgium	Leandro Faggin; Italy	Ercole Baldini; Italy
1965 San Sebastián	Leandro Faggin; Italy	Ferdinand Bracke; Belgium	Dieter Kemper; West Germany
1966 Frankfurt	Leandro Faggin; Italy	Ferdinand Bracke; Belgium	Dieter Kemper; West Germany
1967 Amsterdam	Tiemen Groen; Netherlands	Hugh Porter; Great Britain	Leandro Faggin; Italy
1968 Rome	Hugh Porter; Great Britain	Ole Ritter; Denmark	Leandro Faggin; Italy
1969 Antwerp	Ferdinand Bracke; Belgium	Hugh Porter; Great Britain	Peter Post; Netherlands
1970 Leicester	Hugh Porter; Great Britain	Lorenzo Bosisio; Italy	Charly Grosskost; France
1971 Varese	Dirk Baert; Belgium	Charly Grosskost; France	Hugh Porter; Great Britain
1972 Marseille	Hugh Porter; Great Britain	Ferdinand Bracke; Belgium	Dirk Baert; Belgium
1973 San Sebastián	Hugh Porter; Great Britain	René Pijnen; Netherlands	Ferdinand Bracke; Belgium
1974 Montreal	Roy Schuiten; Netherlands	Ferdinand Bracke; Belgium	René Pijnen; Netherlands
1975 Rocourt	Roy Schuiten; Netherlands	Knut Knudsen; Norway	Dirk Baert; Belgium
1976 Monteroni di Lecce	Francesco Moser; Italy	Roy Schuiten; Netherlands	Knut Knudsen; Norway
1977 San Cristóbal	Gregor Braun; West Germany	Knut Knudsen; Norway	Steve Heffernan; Great Britain
1978 Munich	Gregor Braun; West Germany	Roy Schuiten; Netherlands	Jean-Luc Vandenbroucke; Belgium
1979 Amsterdam	Bert Oosterbosch; Netherlands	Francesco Moser; Italy	Herman Ponsteen; Netherlands
1980 Besançon	Tony Doyle; Great Britain	Herman Ponsteen; Netherlands	Hans-Henrik Ørsted; Denmark
1981 Brno	Alain Bondue; France	Hans-Henrik Ørsted; Denmark	Bert Oosterbosch; Netherlands
1982 Leicester	Alain Bondue; France	Hans-Henrik Ørsted; Denmark	Maurizio Bidinost; Italy
1983 Zürich	Steele Bishop; Australia	Robert Dill-Bundi; Switzerland	Hans-Henrik Ørsted; Denmark
1984 Barcelona	Hans-Henrik Ørsted; Denmark	Tony Doyle; Great Britain	Jean-Luc Vandenbroucke; Belgium
1985 Bassano del Grappa	Hans-Henrik Ørsted; Denmark	Tony Doyle; Great Britain	Gregor Braun; West Germany
1986 Colorado Springs	Tony Doyle; Great Britain	Hans-Henrik Ørsted; Denmark	Jesper Worre; Denmark
1987 Vienna	Hans-Henrik Ørsted; Denmark	Jesper Worre; Denmark	Tony Doyle; Great Britain
1988 Ghent	Lech Piasecki; Poland	Tony Doyle; Great Britain	Jesper Worre; Denmark
1989 Lyon	Colin Sturgess; Great Britain	Dean Woods; Australia	Régis Clere; France
1990 Maebashi	Viatcheslav Ekimov; Soviet Union	Francis Moreau; France	Armand de Las Cuevas; France
1991 Stuttgart	Francis Moreau; France	Shaun Wallace; Great Britain	Colin Sturgess; Great Britain
1992 Valencia	Mike McCarthy; United States	Shaun Wallace; Great Britain	Artūras Kasputis; Lithuania
1993 Hamar	Graeme Obree; Great Britain	Philippe Ermenault; France	Chris Boardman; Great Britain
1994 Palermo	Chris Boardman; Great Britain	Francis Moreau; France	Jens Lehmann; Germany
1995 Bogotá	Graeme Obree; Great Britain	Andrea Collinelli; Italy	Stuart O'Grady; Australia
1996 Manchester	Chris Boardman; Great Britain	Andrea Collinelli; Italy	Francis Moreau; France
1997 Perth	Philippe Ermenault; France	Alexei Markov; Russia	Andrea Collinelli; Italy
1998 Bordeaux	Philippe Ermenault; France	Francis Moreau; France	Robert Bartko; Germany
1999 Berlin	Robert Bartko; Germany	Jens Lehmann; Germany	Mauro Trentini; Italy
2000 Manchester	Jens Lehmann; Germany	Stefan Steinweg; Germany	Rob Hayles; Great Britain
2001 Antwerp	Alexander Symonenko; Ukraine	Jens Lehmann; Germany	Stefan Steinweg; Germany
2002 Ballerup	Brad McGee; Australia	Luke Roberts; Australia	Jens Lehmann; Germany
2003 Stuttgart	Bradley Wiggins; Great Britain	Luke Roberts; Australia	Sergi Escobar; Spain
2004 Melbourne	Sergi Escobar; Spain	Rob Hayles; Great Britain	Robert Bartko; Germany
2005 Los Angeles	Robert Bartko; Germany	Sergi Escobar; Spain	Levi Heimans; Netherlands
2006 Bordeaux	Robert Bartko; Germany	Jens Mouris; Netherlands	Paul Manning; Great Britain
2007 Palma de Mallorca	Bradley Wiggins; Great Britain	Robert Bartko; Germany	Sergi Escobar; Spain
2008 Manchester	Bradley Wiggins; Great Britain	Jenning Huizenga; Netherlands	Alexei Markov; Russia
2009 Pruszków	Taylor Phinney; United States	Jack Bobridge; Australia	Dominique Cornu; Belgium
2010 Ballerup	Taylor Phinney; United States	Jesse Sergent; New Zealand	Jack Bobridge; Australia
2011 Apeldoorn	Jack Bobridge; Australia	Jesse Sergent; New Zealand	Michael Hepburn; Australia
2012 Melbourne	Michael Hepburn; Australia	Jack Bobridge; Australia	Westley Gough; New Zealand
2013 Minsk	Michael Hepburn; Australia	Martyn Irvine; Ireland	Stefan Küng; Switzerland
2014 Cali	Alex Edmondson; Australia	Stefan Küng; Switzerland	Marc Ryan; New Zealand
2015 Yvelines	Stefan Küng; Switzerland	Jack Bobridge; Australia	Julien Morice; France
2016 London	Filippo Ganna; Italy	Domenic Weinstein; Germany	Andy Tennant; Great Britain
2017 Hong Kong	Jordan Kerby; Australia	Filippo Ganna; Italy	Kelland O'Brien; Australia
2018 Apeldoorn	Filippo Ganna; Italy	Ivo Oliveira; Portugal	Alexander Evtushenko; Russia
2019 Pruszków	Filippo Ganna; Italy	Domenic Weinstein; Germany	Davide Plebani; Italy
2020 Berlin	Filippo Ganna; Italy	Ashton Lambie; United States	Corentin Ermenault; France
2021 Roubaix	Ashton Lambie; United States	Jonathan Milan; Italy	Filippo Ganna; Italy
2022 Saint-Quentin-en-Yvelines	Filippo Ganna; Italy	Jonathan Milan; Italy	Ivo Oliveira; Portugal
2023 Glasgow	Filippo Ganna; Italy	Daniel Bigham; Great Britain	Jonathan Milan; Italy
2024 Ballerup	Jonathan Milan; Italy	Josh Charlton; Great Britain	Daniel Bigham; Great Britain
2025 Santiago	Josh Charlton; Great Britain	Rasmus Pedersen; Denmark	Anders Johnson; United States
2026 Shanghai	Jonathan Milan; Italy	Frederik Madsen; Denmark	Filippo Ganna; Italy

== Medal table ==
Rank	Nation	Gold	Silver	Bronze	Total
1	Italy	19	13	16	48
2	Great Britain	15	10	9	34
3	Australia	9	6	4	19
4	France	8	9	7	24
5	Netherlands	7	8	9	24
6	Germany	4	6	5	15
7	West Germany	4	1	3	8
8	United States	4	1	1	6
9	Denmark	3	8	7	18
10	Belgium	3	4	7	14
11	Switzerland	1	7	2	10
12	Russia	1	1	2	4
12	Spain	1	1	2	4
14	Poland	1	0	0	1
14	Ukraine	1	0	0	1
16	New Zealand	0	2	2	4
17	Norway	0	2	1	3
18	Portugal	0	1	1	2
19	Ireland	0	1	0	1
20	Luxembourg	0	0	2	2
21	Lithuania	0	0	1	1
Totals (21 entries)		81	81	81	243
