= Jean Dunn (cyclist) =

British track cyclist

Personal information
- Born: c. 1934 (age 91–92)

Sport
- Sport: Track cycling
Medal record
Representing Great Britain
World championships
Bronze medal – third place	1958 Paris	Sprint
Bronze medal – third place	1959 Amsterdam	Sprint
Bronze medal – third place	1960 Leipzig	Sprint
Bronze medal – third place	1961 Zürich	Sprint
Bronze medal – third place	1962 Milan	Sprint

Jean Dunn (born c. 1934) is a retired British track cyclist. She won bronze medals in the sprint at five consecutive world championships in 1958–1962, behind the Soviet riders Galina Ermolaeva and Valentina Maximova-Pantilova.
