= 1962 UCI Road World Championships =

- Location within Italy
- Venue: Salò, Italy
- Date: 31 August-2 September 1962

The 1962 UCI Road World Championships took place from 31 August-2 September 1962 in Salò, Italy. The team time trial made its debut.

In the same period, the 1962 UCI Track Cycling World Championships were organized in Milan, Italy.

== Results ==
| Race: | Gold: | Time | Silver: | Time | Bronze: | Time |
Men
| Men's road race | Jean Stablinski; France | 7 h 43 min 11s | Seamus Elliott; Ireland | + 1 min 22s | Jos Hoevenaars; Belgium | + 1 min 44s |
| Amateurs' road race | Renato Boncioni; Italy | - | Ole Ritter; Denmark | - | Arie den Hartog; Netherlands | - |
| Team time trial | Italy; Mario Maino; Antonio Tagliani; Dino Zandegù; Danilo Grassi | – | Denmark; Ole Ritter; Vagn Bangsburg; Mogens Twilling; Ole Kroier | – | Uruguay; Rubén Etchebarne; Juan José Timón; Vid Cencic; Rene Pezzati | - |
Women
| Women's road race | Marie-Rose Gaillard; Belgium | - | Yvonne Reynders; Belgium | - | Marie-Thérèse Naessens; Belgium | - |

== Medal table ==
| Rank | Nation | Gold | Silver | Bronze | Total |
|---|---|---|---|---|---|
| 1 | Italy (ITA) | 2 | 0 | 0 | 2 |
| 2 | Belgium (BEL) | 1 | 1 | 2 | 4 |
| 3 | France (FRA) | 1 | 0 | 0 | 1 |
| 4 | Denmark (DEN) | 0 | 2 | 0 | 2 |
| 5 | Ireland (IRL) | 0 | 1 | 0 | 1 |
| 6 | Netherlands (NED) | 0 | 0 | 1 | 1 |
| 6 | Uruguay (URU) | 0 | 0 | 1 | 1 |
| Totals (7 entries) | | 4 | 4 | 4 | 12 |
