= 1960 UCI Road World Championships =

- Location within East Germany
- Venue: Sachsenring, East Germany
- Date: 13–14 August 1960
- Coordinates: 50°48′N 12°43′E

The 1960 UCI Road World Championships was the 33rd edition of the UCI Road World Championships.

It took place on from 13 to 14 August 1960 on the Sachsenring for the two men's races, and in Leipzig for the women's race, in East Germany. It was the only time that the Cycling World Championships were organized in the German Democratic Republic.

The road race among professional cyclists (279.3 km or 32 rounds) was won by the Belgian Rik Van Looy, who defeated last year's world champion André Darrigade in a group sprint. In the 61.1 km women's race, Britain's Beryl Burton won. East German Bernhard Eckstein became world amateur champion after a race of 174.6 km (20 rounds).

In the same period, the 1960 UCI Track Cycling World Championships were organized in the Alfred-Rosch-Kampfbahn in Leipzig and the Chemnitz Velodrome in Chemnitz, East Germany.

== Results ==
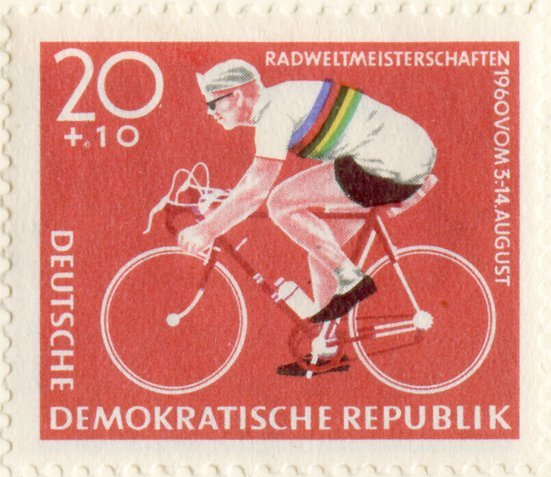
20 Pfennig Stamp of the German Democratic Republic for the Championships

Race:	Gold:	Time	Silver:	Time	Bronze:	Time
Men
Men's road race	Rik Van Looy; Belgium	7 h 47 min 27s	André Darrigade; France	m.t.	Pino Cerami; Belgium	m.t.
Amateurs' road race	Bernhard Eckstein; East Germany	-	Gustav-Adolf Schur; East Germany	-	Willy Vanden Berghen; Belgium	-
Women
Women's road race	Beryl Burton; Great Britain	-	Rosa Sels; Belgium	-	Elisabeth Kleinhaus; East Germany	-

== Medal table ==
Rank	Nation	Gold	Silver	Bronze	Total
1	Belgium (BEL)	1	1	2	4
2	East Germany (DDR)	1	1	1	3
3	Great Britain (GBR)	1	0	0	1
4	France (FRA)	0	1	0	1
Totals (4 entries)		3	3	3	9
