= Giuseppe Beghetto =

Italian cyclist (born 1939)

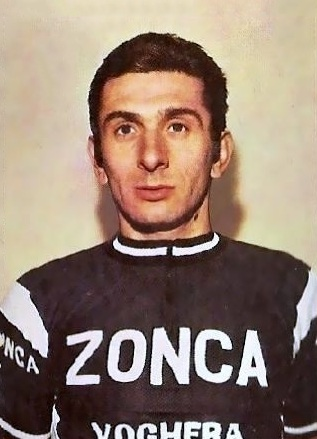
- Giuseppe Beghetto in 1971

Personal information
- Full name: Giuseppe Beghetto
- Born: 8 October 1939 (age 87) Tombolo, Italy

Cycling career
- Sport: Cycling
- Disciplines: Track and road
- Role: Rider

Professional teams
- 1962–1966: Termozeta
- 1967: Ignis
- 1968: Vittadello
- 1969–1970: Ferretti
- 1971–1972: Zonca
- 1973: Supermercato Calzature
Medal record
Representing Italy
Men's track cycling
Olympic Games
Gold medal – first place	1960 Rome	Tandem
World Championships
Silver medal – second place	1961 Zurich	Sprint, amateur
Silver medal – second place	1962 Milan	Sprint, amateur
Gold medal – first place	1965 San Sebastian	Sprint
Gold medal – first place	1966 Frankfurt	Sprint
Silver medal – second place	1967 Amsterdam	Sprint
Gold medal – first place	1968 Rome	Sprint

Giuseppe Beghetto (born 8 October 1939) is a retired Italian cyclist who was active between 1958 and 1971 on the road and track. On the track, he won three gold and three silver medals in the sprint at the world championships of 1961–1968. He also won a gold medal in the tandem event at the 1960 Summer Olympics, together with his sprint rival Sergio Bianchetto, and set world records in the 200 m (11.40) and in 1 km (1:08.40). In 1961 he won the International Champion of Champions sprint at Herne Hill velodrome. On the road, he won two stages of Giro di Sardegna in 1969 and took part in the 1970 Tour de France.

== Personal life ==
His sons, Massimo and Luigi are former professional footballers. His grandson Andrea is a current footballer for Genoa.
