= Bernd Rohr =

German racing cyclist (1937–2022)

Personal information
- Born: 13 November 1937 Mannheim, Baden, Germany
- Died: 5 December 2022 (aged 85) Mannheim, Baden-Württemberg, Germany
- Height: 1.89 m (6 ft 2 in)
- Weight: 83 kg (183 lb)

Cycling career
- Sport: Cycling
- Disciplines: Track; Road
- Role: Rider

Professional teams
- ?–1964: RRC Endspurt Mannheim
- 1964–1968: Ruberg–Caltex, Ruberg-Continental

Bernd Rohr (13 November 1937 – 5 December 2022) was a German racing cyclist. He notably won the amateur team pursuit at the 1962 UCI Track Cycling World Championships alongside Ehrenfried Rudolph, Klaus May, and Lothar Claesges.
