= Michel Rousseau (cyclist) =

French cyclist (1936–2016)

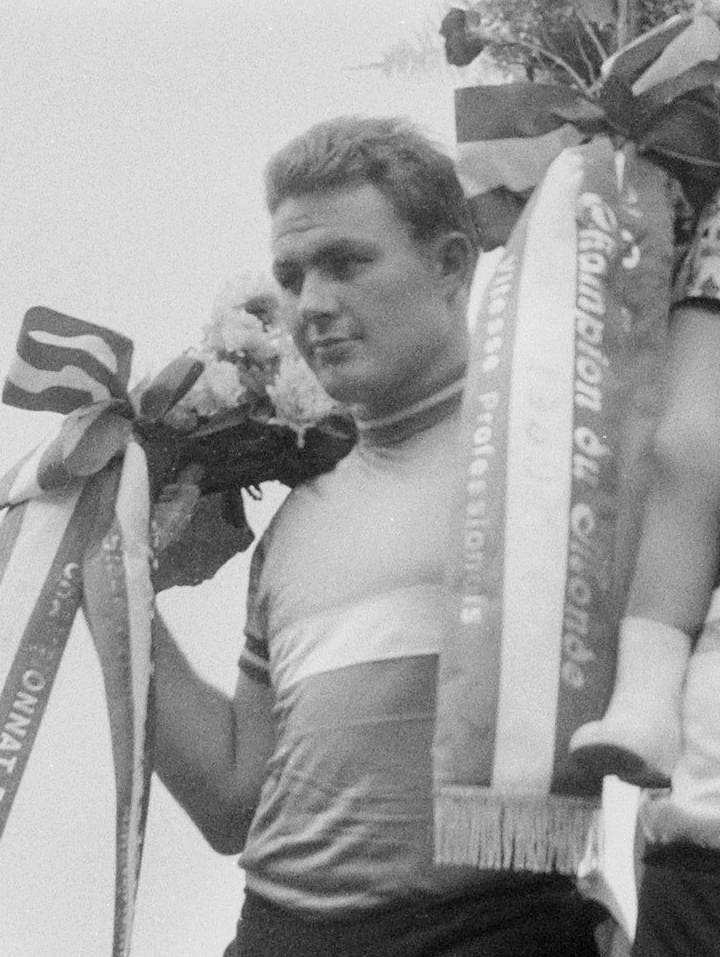
- Michel Rousseau at the 1959 World Championships

Personal information
- Full name: Michel Guy Rousseau
- Born: 5 February 1936 Paris, France
- Died: 23 September 2016 (aged 80) Saint-Yrieix-la-Perche, France

Cycling career
- Sport: Cycling
Medal record
Representing France
Olympic Games
Gold medal – first place	1956 Melbourne	Sprint
World championships
Gold medal – first place	1956 Copenhagen	Sprint
Gold medal – first place	1957 Rocourt	Sprint
Gold medal – first place	1958 Paris	Sprint
Silver medal – second place	1959 Amsterdam	Sprint
Silver medal – second place	1961 Zurich	Sprint

Michel Guy Rousseau (5 February 1936 – 23 September 2016) was a French amateur track cyclist. He won gold medals in the individual sprint at the 1956 Summer Olympics and 1956–1958 world championships, finishing second in 1959 and 1961.

His grandson Cassiel Rousseau is an Australian diver who competed at the 2020 Summer Olympics in the Men's 10 metre platform. Cassiel also competed and claimed gold in the Men's 10 meter platform event in the 2023 World Aquatic Championships, creating history for Australia.
