= Antonio Maspes =

Italian cyclist

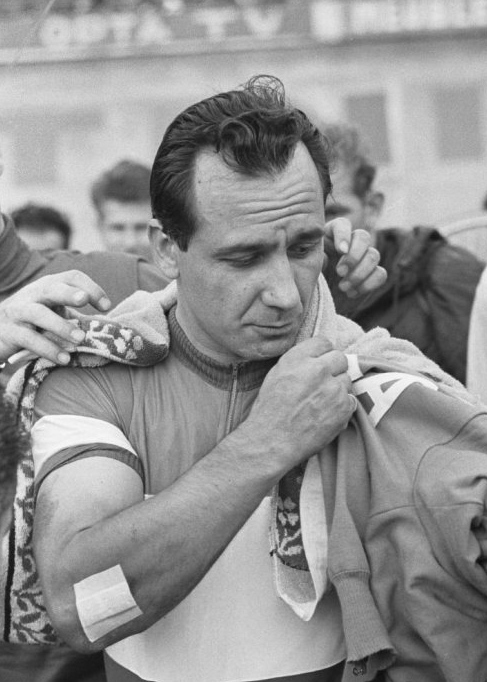
- Maspes in 1963

Personal information
- Full name: Antonio Maspes
- Born: 14 January 1932 Milan, Italy
- Died: 19 October 2000 (aged 68) Milan, Italy

Cycling career
- Sport: Cycling
- Discipline: Track
- Role: Rider
- Rider type: Sprint
Medal record
Representing Italy
Men's track cycling
Olympic Games
Bronze medal – third place	1952 Helsinki	Tandem
World Championships
Gold medal – first place	1955 Milan	Sprint
Gold medal – first place	1956 Copenhagen	Sprint
Gold medal – first place	1959 Amsterdam	Sprint
Gold medal – first place	1960 Leipzig	Sprint
Gold medal – first place	1961 Zürich	Sprint
Gold medal – first place	1962 Milan	Sprint
Gold medal – first place	1964 Paris	Sprint
Silver medal – second place	1963 Rocourt	Sprint
Bronze medal – third place	1958 Paris	Sprint

Antonio Maspes (14 January 1932 – 19 October 2000) was an Italian world champion sprinter cyclist. Maspes was born and died in Milan. Maspes won seven professional world championship sprint titles between 1955 and 1964. He competed in the men's tandem event at the 1952 Summer Olympics, winning a bronze medal. Maspes also had a record five consecutive titles in the Grand Prix de Paris (1960-1964).

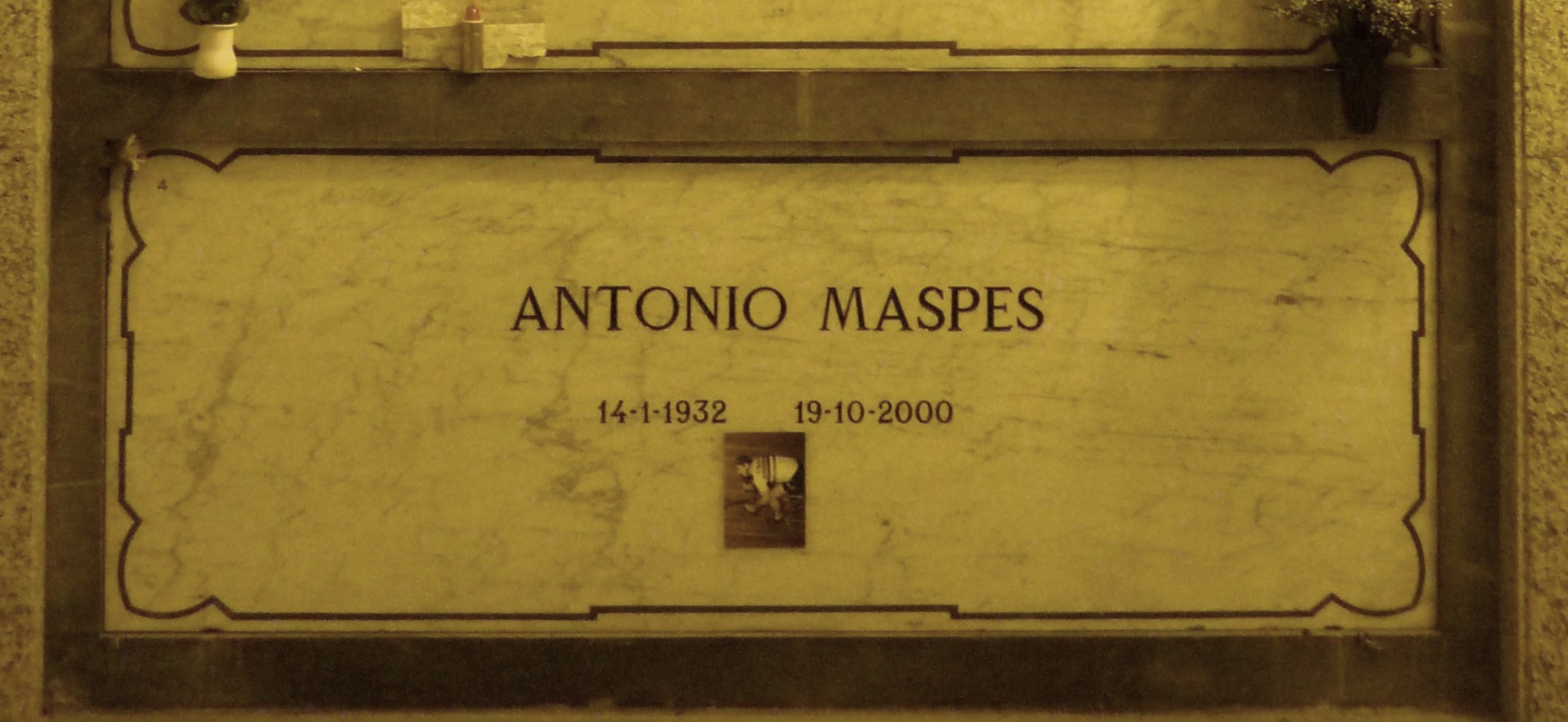
Maspes's grave at the Monumental Cemetery of Milan in 2015

After his death, the Velodromo Vigorelli in Milano, where Maspes began with racing competitions, was renamed into Velodromo Maspes-Vigorelli.

== Palmarès ==
1948
1st, Coppa Caldirola
1949
1st, Sprint, National championship
1952
1st, Sprint, National championship
3rd, Tandem,
1953
1st, Sprint, National championship
1954
3rd, GP de Paris, Sprint
1st, Sprint, National championship
1955
1st, World championship, professional sprint, Milan
1956
3rd, GP de Paris
1st, Sprint, National championship
1st, World championship, professional sprint, Copenhagen
1957
1st, Sprint, National championship
1958
3rd, World championship, professional sprint, Paris
1959
1st, Sprint, National championship
1st, World championship, professional sprint, Amsterdam
1960
1st, GP de Paris, Sprint
1st, Sprint, National championship
1st, World championship, professional sprint, Leipzig
1961
1st, GP de Paris, Sprint
1st, Sprint, National championship
1st, World championship, professional sprint, Zürich
1962
1st, GP de Paris, Sprint
1st, Sprint, National championship
1st, World championship, professional sprint, Milan
1963
1st, GP de Paris, Sprint
1st, Sprint, National championship
2nd, World championship, professional sprint, Rocourt
1964
1st, GP de Paris, Sprint
1st, World championship, professional sprint, Paris
2nd, Sprint, National championship
1965
1st, Sprint, National championship

== See also ==
- Legends of Italian sport - Walk of Fame
