= Bernard Deconinck =

French cyclist (1936–2020)

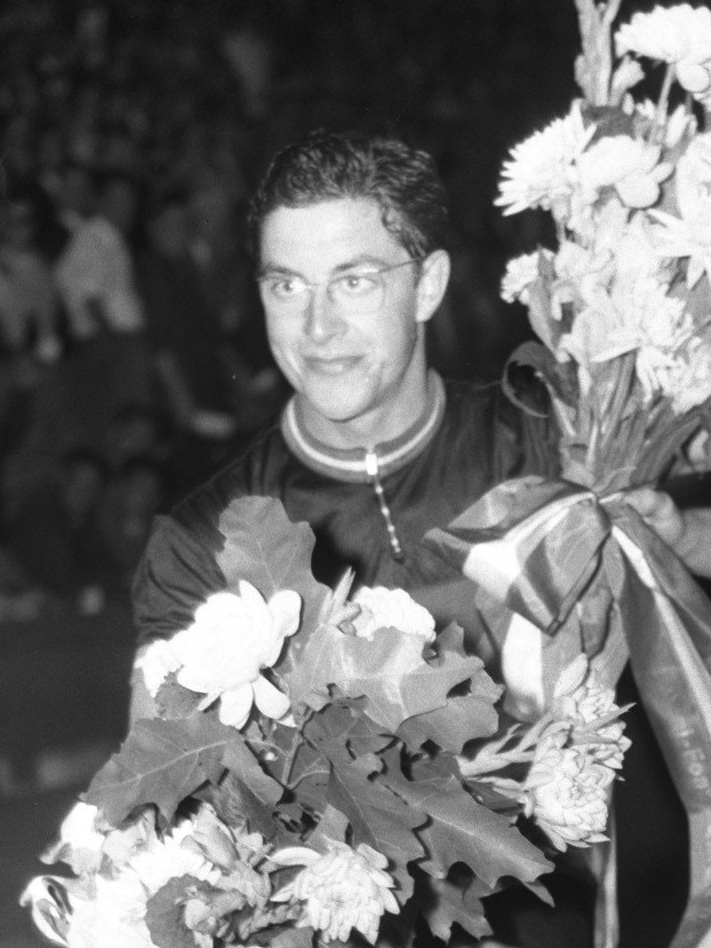
- Deconinck at the 1959 World Championships

Personal information
- Born: 26 April 1936 Lille, France
- Died: 15 April 2020 (aged 83) Cavaillon, France

Sport
- Sport: Track cycling
Medal record
Representing France
World championships
Silver medal – second place	1959 Amsterdam	Motor paced

Bernard Deconinck (26 April 1936 – 15 April 2020) was a French track cyclist who won a silver medal in the motor-paced racing at the 1959 World Championships. His father Henri Deconinck was an elite road cyclist.

Deconinck died in Cavaillon on 15 April 2020 at the age of 83.
