= Valentina Maksimova =

Personal information
- Born: 21 May 1937 (age 89) Tula, Russia

Sport
- Sport: Track cycling
- Club: Spartak Tula
Medal record
Representing the Soviet Union
World championships
Silver medal – second place	1958 Paris	Sprint
Silver medal – second place	1959 Amsterdam	Sprint
Silver medal – second place	1960 Leipzig	Sprint
Silver medal – second place	1961 Zürich	Sprint

Valentina Mikhailovna Maksimova (Russian: Валентина Михайловна Максимова; born 21 May 1937) is a retired Russian track cyclist. She won silver medals in the sprint at four consecutive world championships in 1958–1961, behind Galina Ermolaeva. Between 1953 and 1955 she set seven Soviet records in 200–500 m events.

Maksimova graduated from the Institute of Pedagogy in Tula and then from the Russian State University of Physical Education, Sport, Youth and Tourism, where she also defended a PhD on training sprint cyclists. From 1985 to 1993 she headed the women's section of the Soviet Cycling Federation, and since 1988 was an executive member of the Russian Cycling Federation.
