= Irina Kirichenko =

Soviet cyclist (1937–2020)

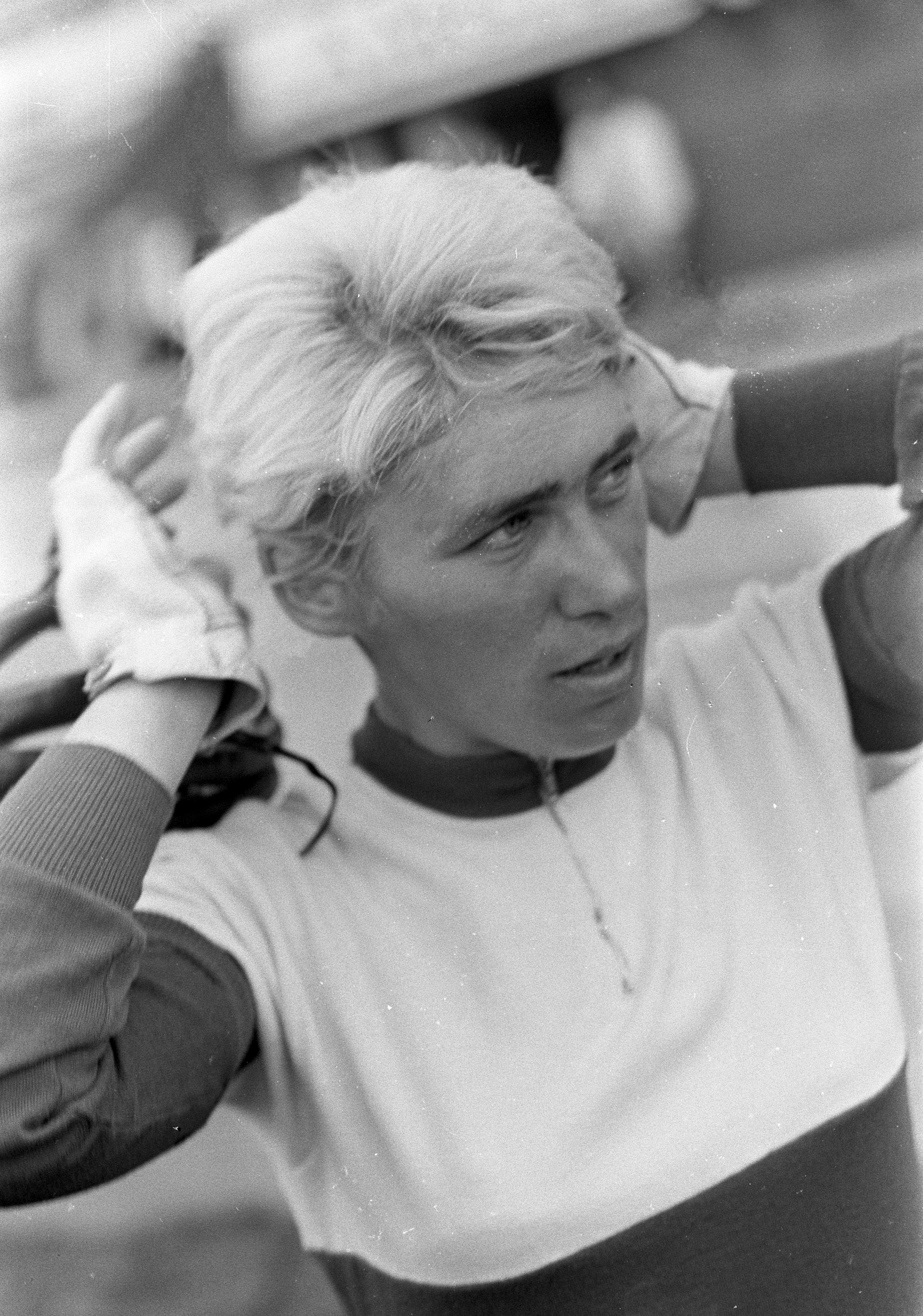
- Irina Kirichenko in 1967

Personal information
- Born: 13 June 1937 Voroshilovgrad, Ukrainian SSR, USSR (now Luhansk, disputed between Ukraine & Russia)
- Died: 11 March 2020 (aged 82)

Sport
- Sport: Cycling
- Club: Dynamo
Medal record
Representing Soviet Union
World Championships
Silver medal – second place	1962 Milan	Individual sprint
Silver medal – second place	1963 Rocourt	Individual sprint
Gold medal – first place	1964 Paris	Individual sprint
Gold medal – first place	1966 Frankfurt	Individual sprint
Silver medal – second place	1967 Amsterdam	Individual sprint
Silver medal – second place	1968 Rome	Individual sprint
Bronze medal – third place	1969 Antwerp	Individual sprint

Irina Ivanovna Kirichenko (Russian: Ири́на Ива́новна Кириче́нко; 13 June 1937 – 11 March 2020) was a Soviet sprint cyclist who won two gold, four silver and one bronze medal at the UCI Track Cycling World Championships in 1962–1969. Between 1960 and 1969 she also won 10 national titles. After retirement from competitions she worked as a cycling coach in Kharkiv.
