= Galina Tsareva =

Soviet sprint cyclist (born 1950)

Personal information
- Born: 19 April 1950 (age 76) Velikie Luki, Russia

Sport
- Sport: Track cycling
- Club: Lokomotiv
Medal record
Representing Soviet Union
World Championships
Gold medal – first place	1969 Antwerp	Individual sprint
Gold medal – first place	1970 Leicester	Individual sprint
Gold medal – first place	1971 Varese	Individual sprint
Bronze medal – third place	1974 Montreal	Individual sprint
Gold medal – first place	1977 San Cristóbal	Individual sprint
Gold medal – first place	1978 Munich	Individual sprint
Gold medal – first place	1979 Amsterdam	Individual sprint
Silver medal – second place	1980 Besançon	Individual sprint

Galina Georgievna Tsareva (Russian: Галина Георгиевна Царева; born 19 April 1950) is a retired Soviet sprint cyclist who dominated the UCI Track Cycling World Championships of 1969–1980, winning 6 gold, 1 silver and 1 bronze medals. Between 1969 and 1987 she won at least 10 national titles. She had an unusually long cycling career and was a candidate for the 1988 Olympic team, when women's track cycling was first introduced to the Olympics.

She married cycling coach Aleksandr Kuznetsov, they have three children. Nikolai (b. 1973) is a Russian cyclist who won a silver medal at the 1996 Olympics; Aleksei is also a competitive cyclist, whereas Svetlana (b. 1985) is a prominent Russian tennis player.

== Major results ==
1969
UCI World Championships

1st Sprint

1970
UCI World Championships

1st Sprint

1971
UCI World Championships

1st Sprint

1974
UCI World Championships

3rd Sprint

1977
UCI World Championships

1st Sprint

1978
UCI World Championships

1st Sprint

1979
UCI World Championships

1st Sprint

1980
UCI World Championships

2nd Sprint

1987
3rd Paris, Sprint
1989
1st Paris, Sprint
