= Denise Burton =

British cyclist (born 1956)

Personal information
- Born: 24 January 1956 (age 70) Leeds, England

Cycling career
- Sport: Cycling
- Disciplines: Road and track
- Role: Rider
Medal record
Representing Great Britain
UCI Track Cycling World Championships
Bronze medal – third place	1975 Rocourt, Belgium	Individual pursuit

Denise Burton-Cole (née Burton; born 24 January 1956) is an English retired cyclist. During the mid-late 1970s she won national titles and a world championship bronze medal in 1975 representing Great Britain.

== Family ==
She is the daughter of racing cyclist Beryl Burton (1937–1996).

== Career ==
=== Cycling ===
Burton followed in her mother's footsteps, participating in road racing, track cycling and time trials.

On the track, she won the British women's national Individual pursuit championship in 1975 and 1976, and took a third place bronze medal in the discipline at the 1975 World Championships in Belgium.

She was UK women's national road race champion in 1976, and was second in 1973, 1975 and 1978. Rivalry between mother and daughter also caused tension: after Denise outsprinted her mother to the 1976 title, her mother refused to shake hands with her on the podium.

In time-trials, she won the WCRA 10-miles and 25-miles championships in 1978. In 1982, with her mother, Burton set a British 10-mile record for women riding a tandem: 21 minutes, 25 seconds.

Burton rode the 1986 Tour de France Féminin, finishing 42nd overall. To prepare for the race, she rode the Tour of Norway and the Tour of Texas. She was due to ride the 1987 Tour, she however had to pull out after an accident resulted in her breaking her back.

=== Media appearances ===
She also appeared in the first all-female edition of the BBC Television series, Superstars in 1977.
