= Valentina Savina =

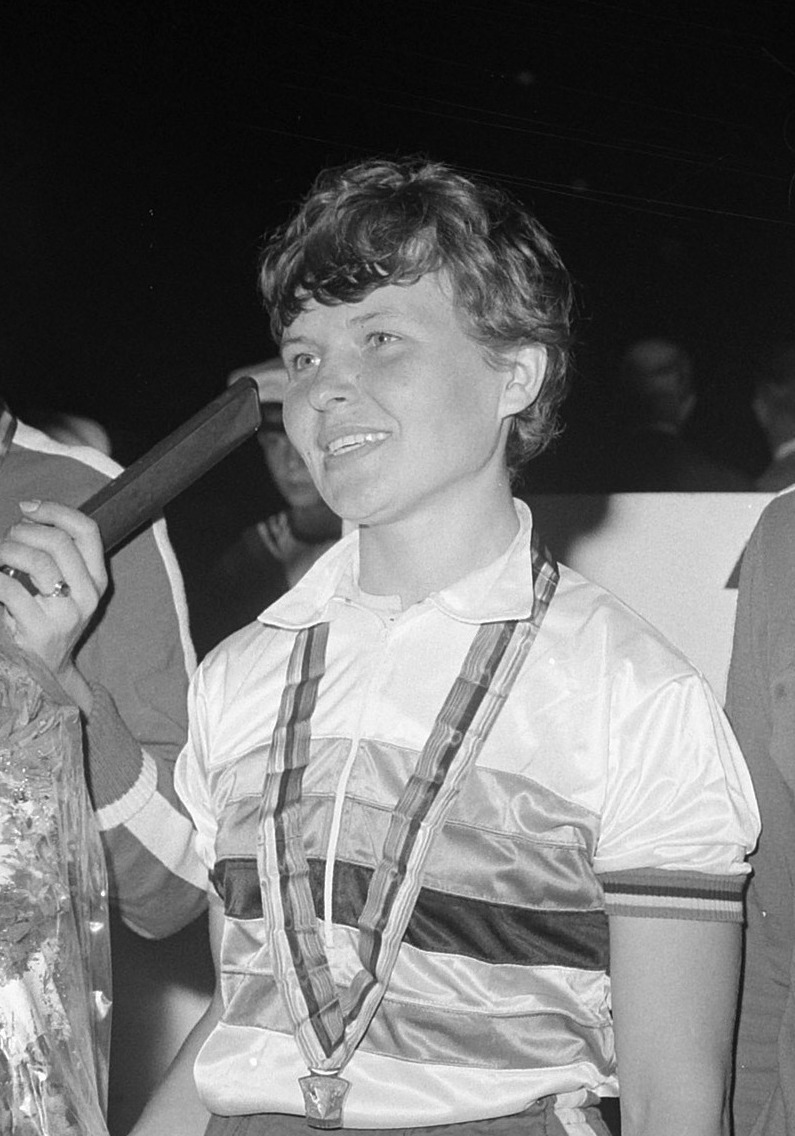
- Valentina Savina in 1967

Personal information
- Born: 1943 (age 82–83)

Sport
- Sport: Track cycling
- Club: Trud
Medal record
Representing Soviet Union
World Championships
Gold medal – first place	1962 Milan	Individual sprint
Bronze medal – third place	1963 Rocourt	Individual sprint
Gold medal – first place	1965 San Sebastián	Individual sprint
Silver medal – second place	1966 Frankfurt	Individual sprint
Gold medal – first place	1967 Amsterdam	Individual sprint
Bronze medal – third place	1970 Leicester	Individual sprint

Valentina Sergeyevna Savina (Russian: Валентина Серге́евна Савина; born 1943) is a retired Soviet sprint cyclist who won three gold, one silver and two bronze medals at the UCI Track Cycling World Championships in 1962–1970. She competed for 16 years and was awarded the Order of the Red Banner of Labour.
