= Willy Trepp =

Swiss cyclist

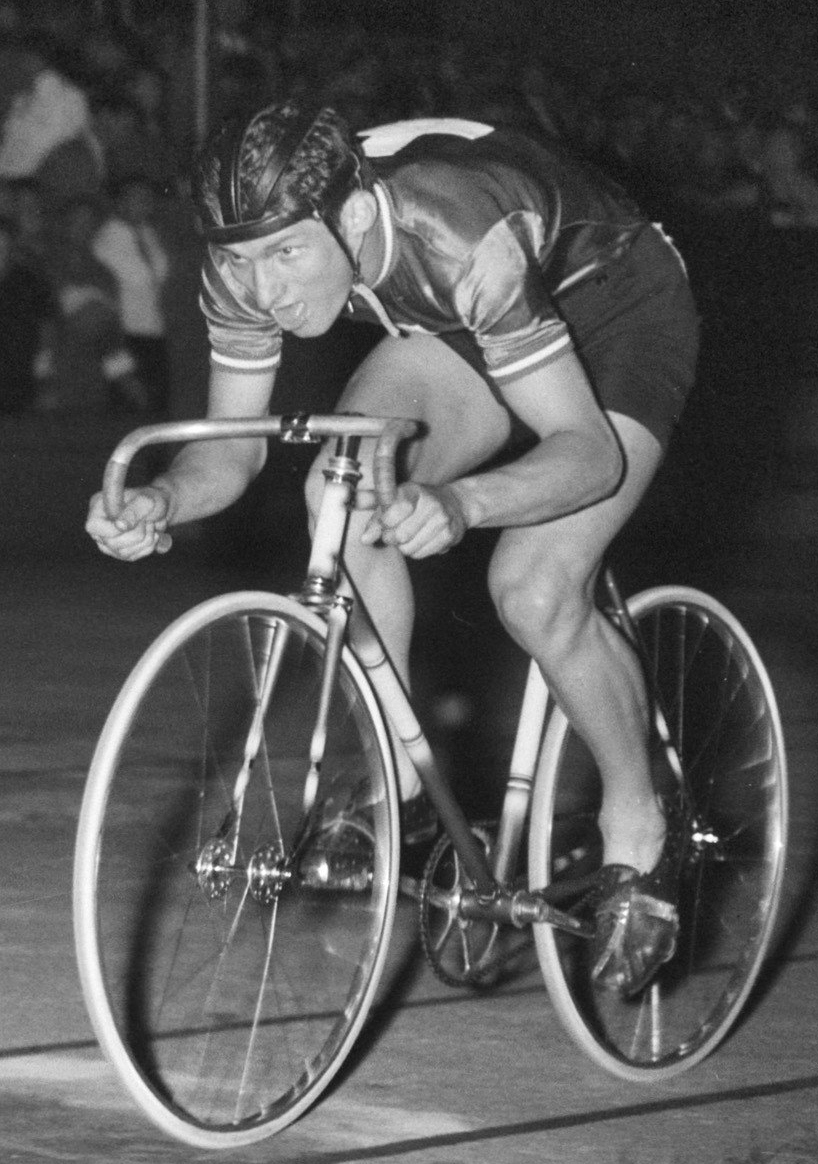
- Willy Trepp at the 1959 World Championships

Personal information
- Born: 23 December 1938 (age 87) Vicosoprano, Switzerland

Sport
- Sport: Track cycling
Medal record
Representing Switzerland
World championships
Bronze medal – third place	1959 Amsterdam	Individual pursuit
Silver medal – second place	1960 Leipzig	Individual pursuit
Silver medal – second place	1961 Zürich	Individual pursuit

Willy Trepp (born 23 December 1938) is a retired Swiss track cyclist. He won two silver and one bronze medals in the individual pursuit at the world championships of 1959–1961, behind Rudi Altig. He also rode in the 1960 Tour de France.

Trepp was the cousin of Ice Hockey player Hans-Martin Trepp.
