= Raisa Obodovskaya =

Soviet cyclist (1948–2012)

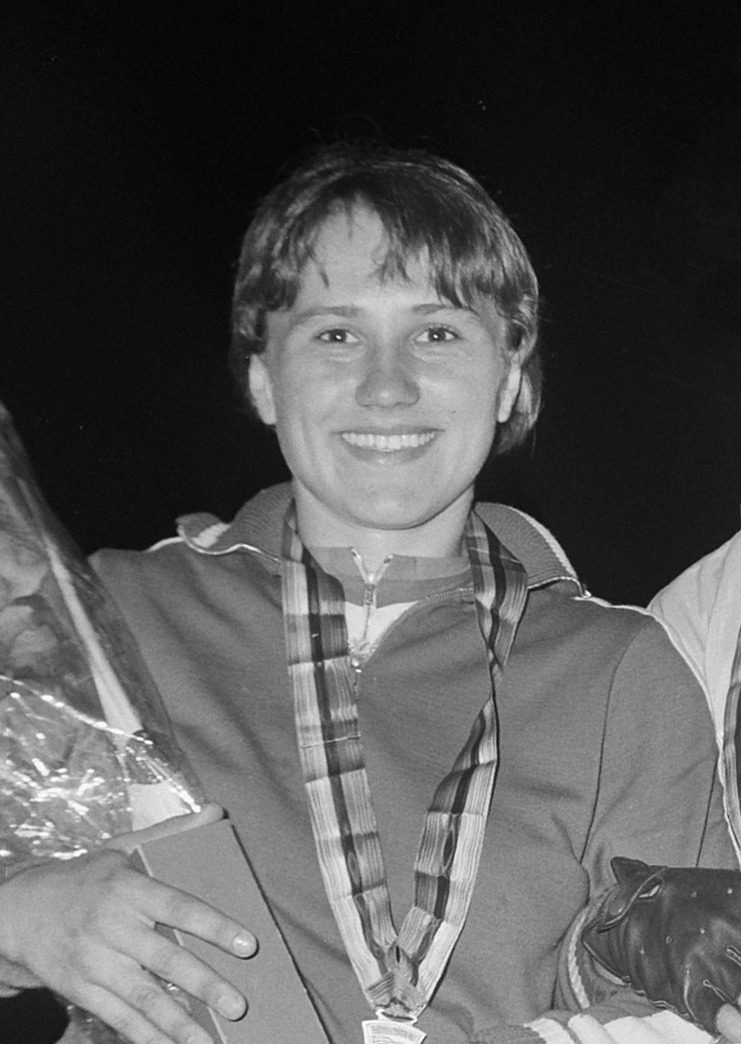
- Raisa Obodovskaya in 1967

Personal information
- Born: 6 August 1948 Merefa, Ukraine
- Died: 30 July 2012 (aged 63)

Sport
- Sport: Cycling
- Club: Avangard
Medal record
Representing the Soviet Union
Track World Championships
Silver medal – second place	1967 Amsterdam	Individual pursuit
Gold medal – first place	1968 Rome	Individual pursuit
Gold medal – first place	1969 Brno	Individual pursuit
Silver medal – second place	1970 Leicester	Individual pursuit
Road World Championships
Bronze medal – third place	1970 Leicester	Road race

Raisa Andreevna Obodovskaya (Russian: Раиса Андреевна Ободовская; 6 August 1948 – 30 July 2012) was a Soviet track and road cyclist. Between 1967 and 1970 she won two gold and two silver medals in the 3 km individual pursuit at world championships, as well as a bronze in the road race in 1970.

In November 1969 she married Yury Gladkov, and later gave birth to daughters Marina and Tanya. She resumed competitions in the late 1970s and won three national titles in road events in 1979–1981. She retired in 1984 and later worked as a director of sports school in Kharkiv.
