= Beryl Burton =

English racing cyclist (1937–1996)

Beryl Burton OBE
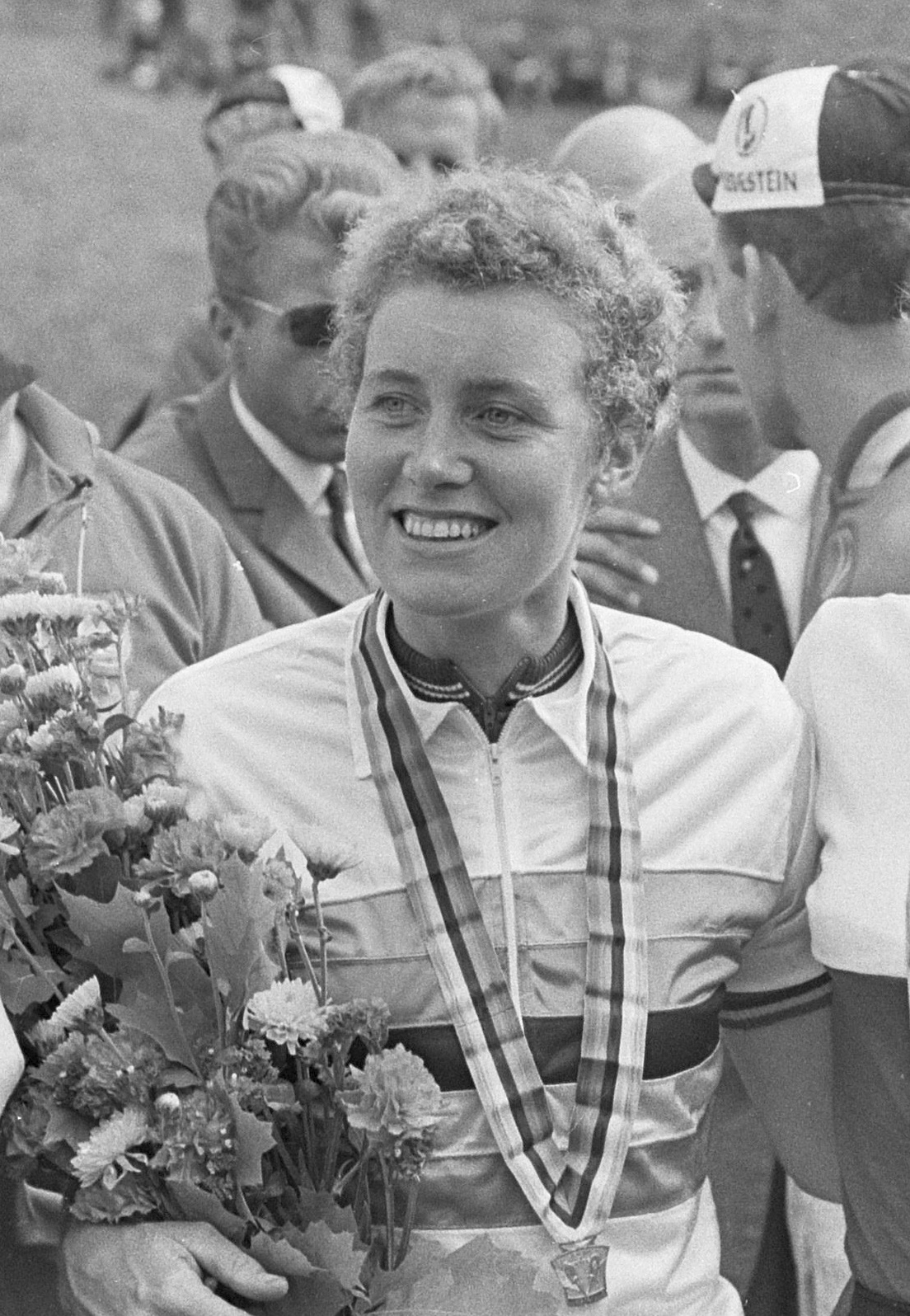
- Burton in 1967

Personal information
- Born: 12 May 1937 Halton, Leeds, England
- Died: 5 May 1996 (aged 58) Yorkshire, England

Cycling career
- Sport: Cycling
- Disciplines: Road and track
- Role: Rider
Medal record
Representing Great Britain
UCI Road World Championships
Gold medal – first place	1960 Sachsenring	Road race
Silver medal – second place	1961 Bern	Road race
Gold medal – first place	1967 Heerlen	Road race
UCI Track Cycling World Championships
Gold medal – first place	1959 Amsterdam	Individual pursuit
Gold medal – first place	1960 Leipzig	Individual pursuit
Silver medal – second place	1961 Zurich	Individual pursuit
Gold medal – first place	1962 Milan	Individual pursuit
Gold medal – first place	1963 Rocourt	Individual pursuit
Silver medal – second place	1964 Paris	Individual pursuit
Gold medal – first place	1966 Frankfurt	Individual pursuit
Bronze medal – third place	1967 Amsterdam	Individual pursuit
Silver medal – second place	1968 Rome	Individual pursuit
Bronze medal – third place	1970 Leicester	Individual pursuit
Bronze medal – third place	1973 San Sebastian	Individual pursuit

Beryl Burton OBE (12 May 1937 – 5 May 1996) was an English racing cyclist who dominated the women's sport, winning more than 90 domestic championships and seven world titles, and setting numerous national records. In 1967, she set a world record for the 12-hour time-trial which exceeded the men's record for two years.

== Early life ==
Burton was born Beryl Charnock in the Halton area of Leeds, West Yorkshire and lived in the nearby Morley area throughout her life, racing mainly for Morley Cycling Club and later Knaresborough CC.

== Cycling ==
She was introduced to cycling through her husband, Charlie Burton, whom she married in 1955. He described her development as a cyclist as follows:

"First of all, she was handy but wasn’t that competent: we used to have to push her round a bit. Slowly she got better. By the second year, she was 'one of the lads' and could ride with us. By the third year, she was going out in front and leading them all. By then it was 1956 and she decided to do a bit of time trialling because I was dabbling at it."

In 1957, she took her first national medal, a silver in the national 100-mile individual time trial championship, and within a few years was competing internationally.

=== International honours ===
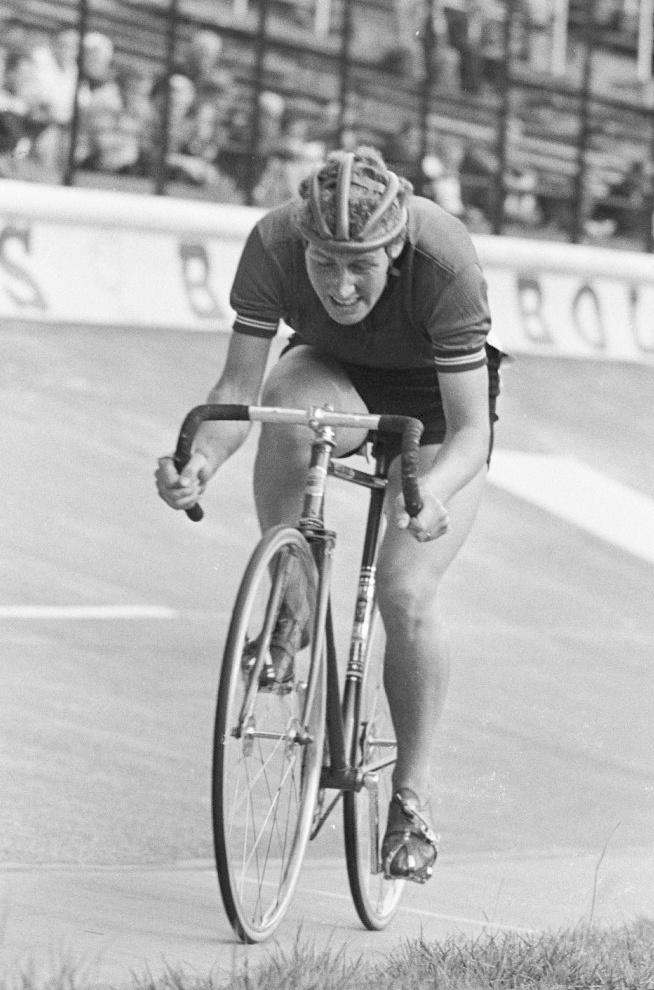
Burton competing on the track in 1967

Burton won the women's world road race championship in 1960 and 1967 and was runner-up in 1961. On the track, she specialised in the individual pursuit, winning world championship medals almost every year across three decades. She was world champion five times (1959, 1960, 1962, 1963 and 1966), silver-medallist three times (1961, 1964 and 1968), and winner of bronze in 1967, 1970 and 1973.

=== Domestic domination ===
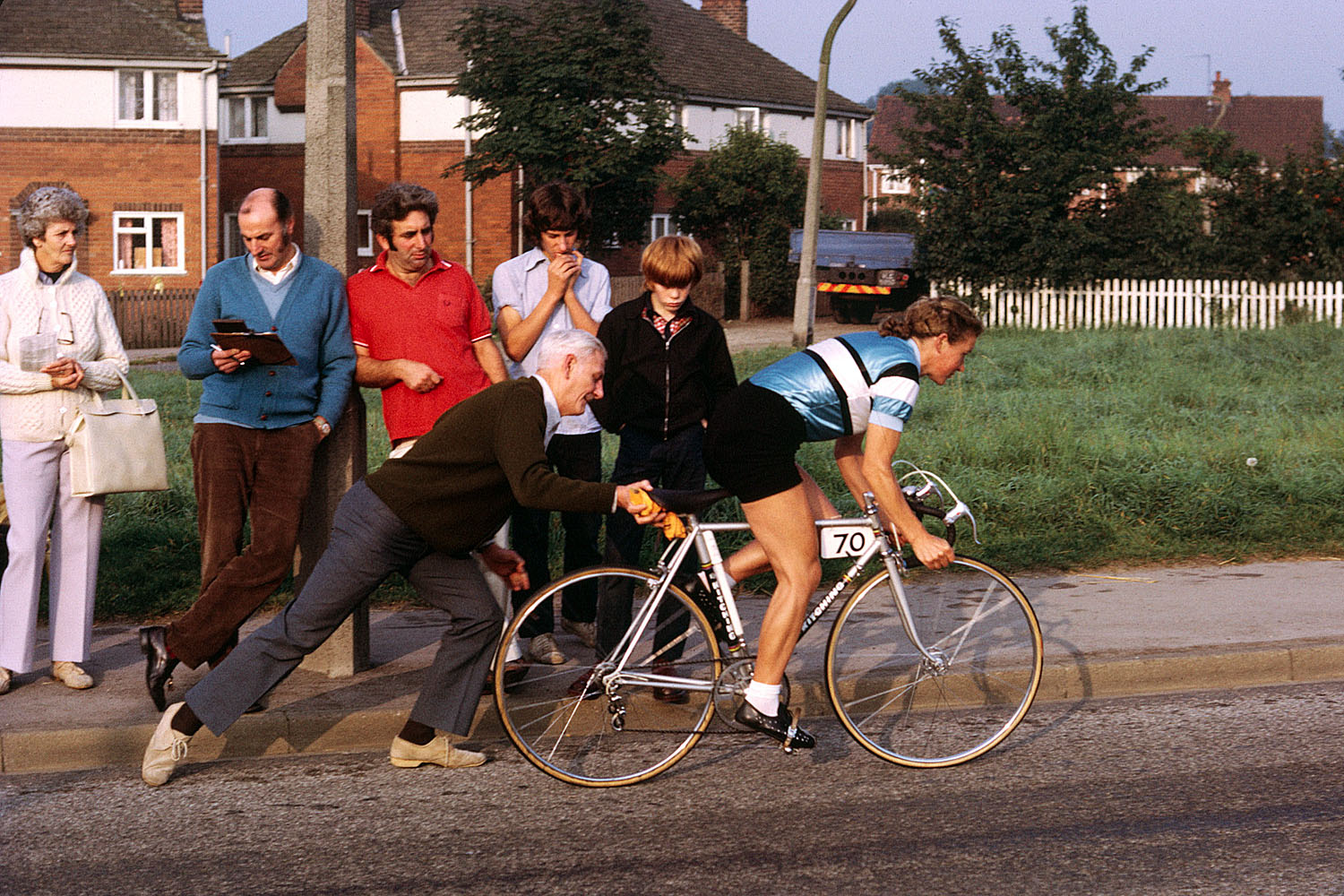
Burton competing in a time trial in Wetherby, West Yorkshire.

In domestic time trial (TT) competition, Burton was almost unbeatable. She won the Road Time Trials Council's British Best All-Rounder Competition for 25 consecutive years from 1959 to 1983. In total, she won 72 national individual time trial titles; she won four at 10 miles (the championship was inaugurated in 1978), 26 at 25 miles, 24 at 50 miles and 18 at 100 miles. Her last national solo time trial titles were achieved in 1986 (at 25 and 50 miles; she was part of the fastest team, Knaresborough CC, in the 50 mile event in 1969).

She also won a further 24 national titles in road racing and on the track: 12 road race championships, and 12 pursuit titles.

=== Record-breaker ===
In 1963, Burton became the first woman to break the hour barrier for the 25-mile time trial, subsequently also going below two hours for the 50-mile TT and four hours for 100 miles against the clock.

In 1967, she set a new 12-hour time trial record of 277.25 miles – a mark that surpassed the men's record of the time by 0.73 miles and was not superseded by a man until 1969. While setting the record, she caught and passed Mike McNamara who was on his way to setting the men's record at 276.52 miles and winning that year's men's British Best All-Rounder. She is reputed to have given him a liquorice allsort as she passed him. As a women's record it wasn't beaten until 2017.

She also set about 50 new national records at 10, 15, 25, 30, 50 and 100-mile distances; her final 10, 25 and 50-mile records each lasted 20 years before being broken, her 100-mile record lasted 28 years, and her 12-hour record stood for 50 years until 2017. Her prowess led to the rare distinction, for a woman, of an invitation to compete in the Grand Prix des Nations in 1967.

In 1982, with her daughter Denise, Burton set a British 10-mile record for women riding a tandem bicycle: 21 minutes, 25 seconds.

== Personal life ==
Despite receiving offers from sponsors, she remained an amateur throughout her career, working on a farm in the Rhubarb Triangle for much of her life.

Her daughter, Denise Burton, was also a top cyclist, winning a bronze in the 1975 world individual pursuit championship. Mother and daughter were both selected to represent Great Britain in the 1972 world championship. In 1973 Beryl won the national road title ahead of Denise. Three years later their positions were reversed. Beryl refused to shake hands with Denise on the podium afterwards, later explaining the incident in her autobiography Personal Best: "I thought Denise had not done her whack in keeping the break away and once again I had 'made the race'… It was not a sporting thing to do… I can only plead I was not myself at the time".

Burton, who had always had a somewhat odd heart arrhythmia, died of heart failure during a social ride, when she was out delivering birthday invitations for her 59th birthday party. Her daughter also suggested that Burton's competitive spirit and drive eventually just wore her body out. Her widower, Charlie, survived until 2023.

== Awards ==
Recognition of her sporting achievements came with her appointment as a Member of the Order of the British Empire (MBE) in the 1964 Birthday Honours, and as an Officer of the Order of the British Empire (OBE) in the 1968 Birthday Honours, in both cases for services to cycling. Burton won UK cycling's top accolade, the Bidlake Memorial Prize, a record three times, in 1959, 1960 and 1967.

== Legacy ==
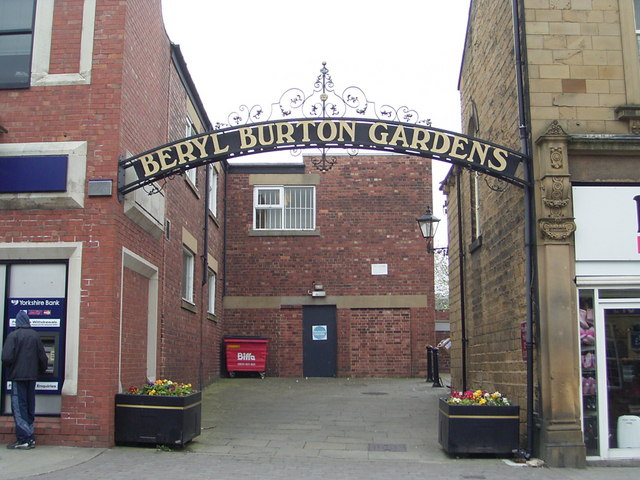

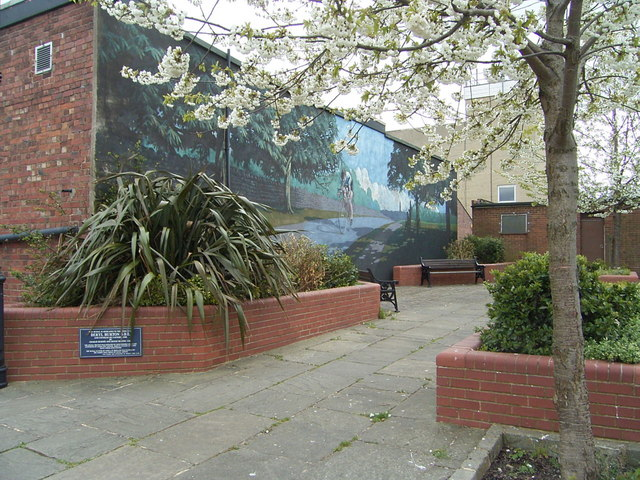
The Beryl Burton Garden in Morley

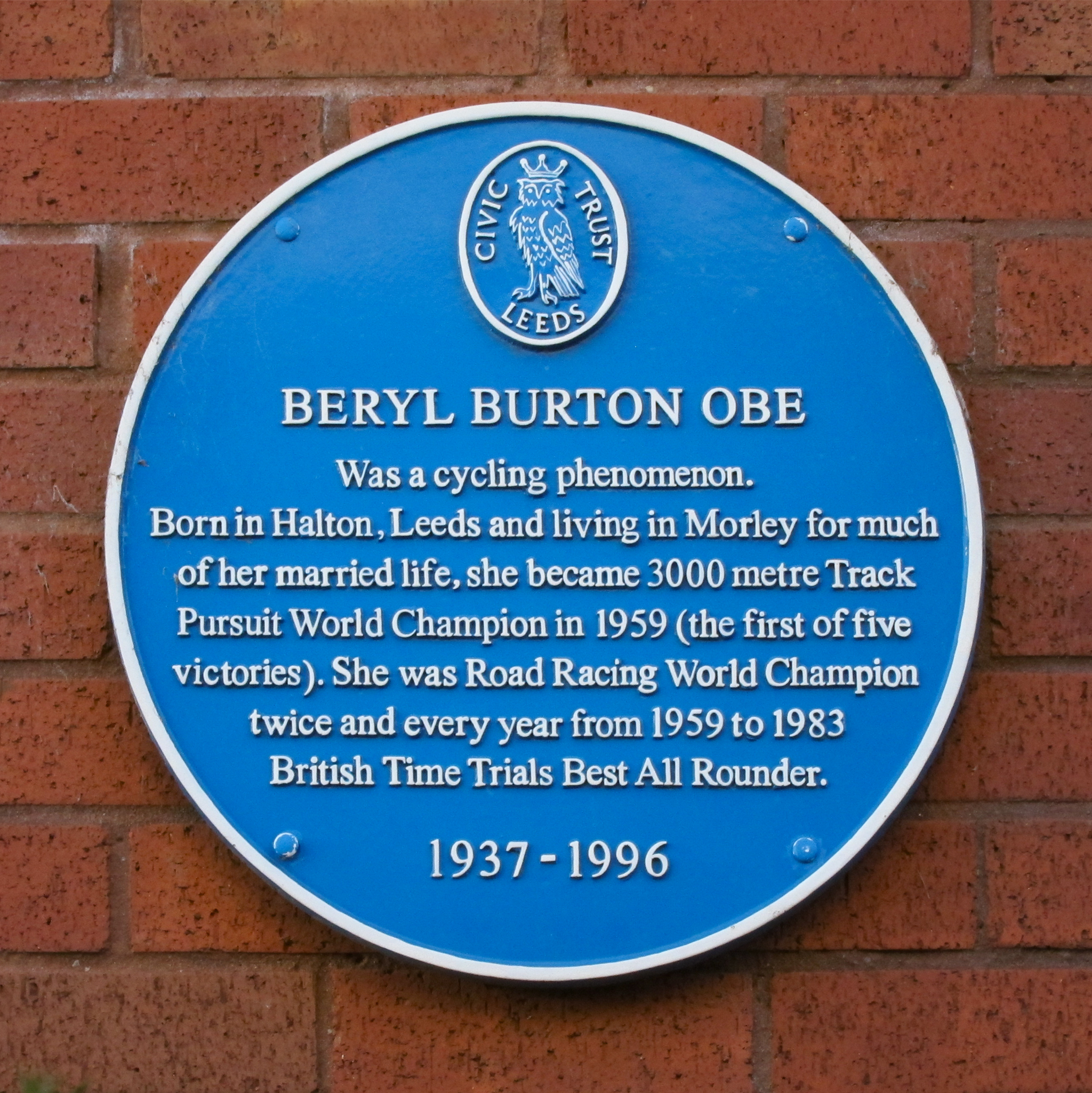

A memorial garden, Beryl Burton Gardens, was established in her home town of Morley and includes a large mural. Morley Cycling Club donated a trophy (previously won 20 times by Burton) to the RTTC for a Champion of Champions competition for women of all ages: the Beryl Burton trophy. The Beryl Burton Cycle Way allows cyclists to travel the 2.8 km between Harrogate and Knaresborough without using the A59 road. A Leeds Civic Trust plaque was added in 2014, unveiled by Maxine Peake who wrote a play about her (see below).

In 2009, she was inducted into the British Cycling Hall of Fame. In 2018 she was named as one of the first two inductees into the Rouleur Hall of Fame, alongside Eddy Merckx.

Her name is one of those featured on the sculpture Ribbons, unveiled in 2024.

Broken Spoke bike co-op in Oxford runs a Beryl's Night in honour of her, a free monthly evening for women and all trans and non-binary people to learn about bikes and use the workshop.

=== Golden Book ===
Burton's career achievements were first celebrated in 1960 when Cycling Weekly awarded her a page in the Golden Book of Cycling. By 1991 her career had developed so far that she was accorded the unique honour of a second 'Golden Book' page.

=== Play ===
On 27 November 2012 a radio play, Beryl: A Love Story on Two Wheels was broadcast by BBC Radio 4, written by and starring Maxine Peake. It included interview snippets with Burton's husband and daughter. This was adapted by Peake for the stage to coincide with the start of the 2014 Tour de France in Leeds, and shown at the West Yorkshire Playhouse in June and July of that year, titled simply Beryl. The play returned for a second run at the same theatre the following summer, followed by an autumn 2015 tour around England. A production of the show is scheduled to take place at the Octagon Theatre, Bolton in September and October 2019. It was revived in September 2023 by Criterion Theatre, a members-run community venue in Coventry.

=== Book ===
A biography, Beryl: In search of Britain's greatest athlete by Jeremy Wilson, was published in 2022 (Pursuit Books, ISBN 978-1788162920). It won the William Hill Sports Book of the Year award for that year.

=== Song ===
The English folk music duo of Belinda O'Hooley and her wife Heidi Tidow, performing as O'Hooley & Tidow, created a song about her titled "Beryl".

=== App ===
The trading name of cycle hire service Beryl is partly named after Burton.
