= Luigina Bissoli =

Italian cyclist

Personal information
- Born: 21 January 1956 (age 70) Vigonza, Italy

Sport
- Sport: Cycling
Medal record
Representing Italy
Road World Championships
Silver medal – second place	1976 Ostuni	Road race
Track World Championships
Silver medal – second place	1976 Monteroni di Lecce	Individual pursuit
Bronze medal – third place	1978 Munich	Individual pursuit
Bronze medal – third place	1979 Amsterdam	Individual pursuit

Luigina Bissoli (born 21 January 1956) is a retired Italian cyclist. She won two silver and two bronze medals at the road and track world championships. Nationally, she won thirteen titles on track and two on the road, in 1975 and 1977. In December 1978 she set three world records, in the 200, 500 and 1,000 m sprint.
