= Yvonne Reynders =

Belgian cyclist (born 1937)

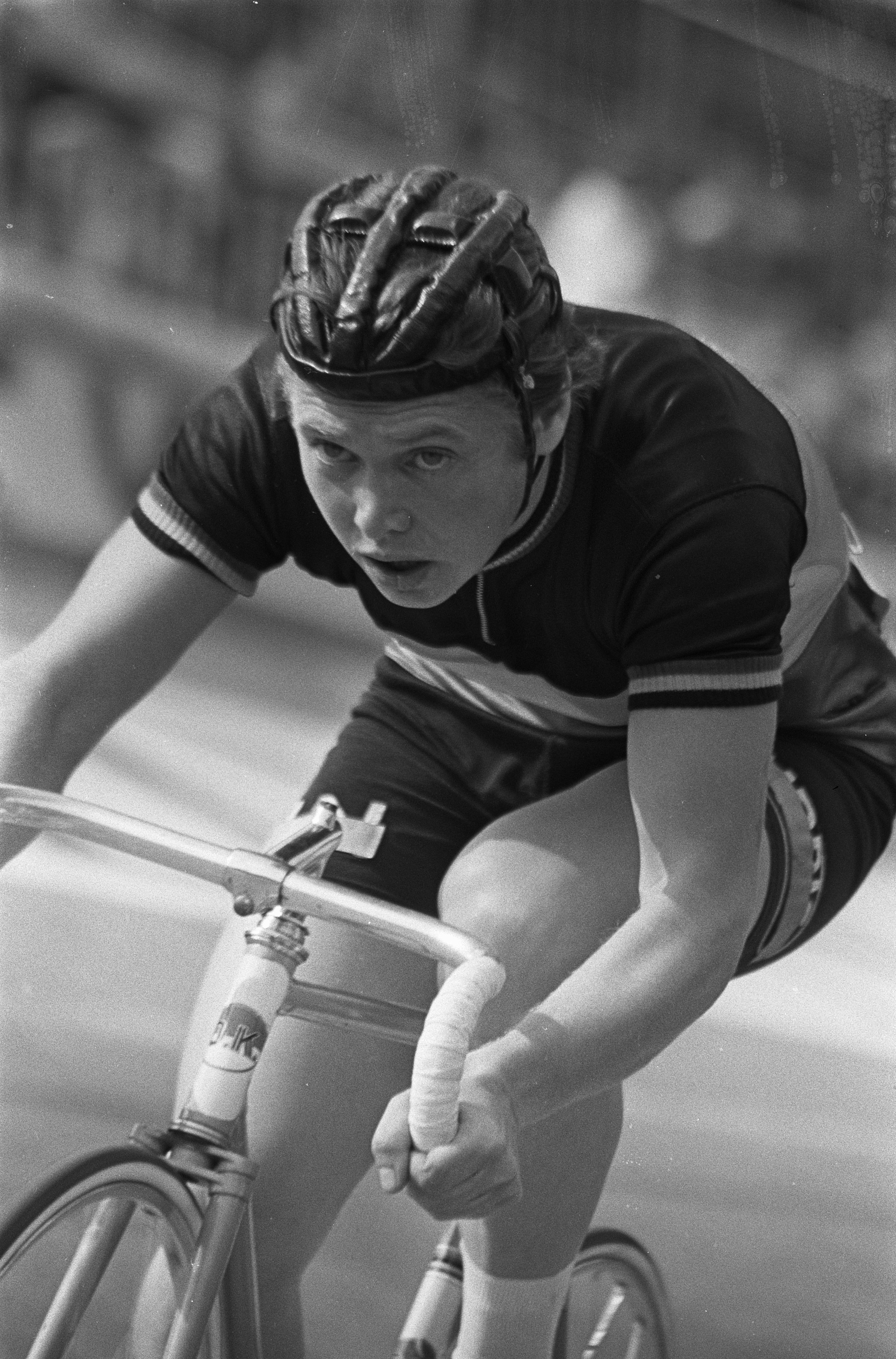
- Yvonne Reynders in 1967

Personal information
- Full name: Yvonne Reynders
- Born: 4 August 1937 (age 89) Schaerbeek, Belgium

Cycling career
- Sport: Cycling
- Disciplines: Road and track
- Role: Rider
Medal record
Representing Belgium
Road World Championships
Gold medal – first place	1959 Zandvoort	Road race
Gold medal – first place	1961 Bern	Road race
Gold medal – first place	1963 Renaix	Road race
Gold medal – first place	1966 Nürburgring	Road race
Silver medal – second place	1962 Salò	Road race
Silver medal – second place	1965 Lasarte-Oria	Road race
Bronze medal – third place	1976 Ostuni	Road race
Track World Championships
Gold medal – first place	1961 Zurich	Individual pursuit
Gold medal – first place	1964 Paris	Individual pursuit
Gold medal – first place	1965 San Sebastián	Individual pursuit
Silver medal – second place	1962 Milan	Individual pursuit
Silver medal – second place	1963 Liège	Individual pursuit
Silver medal – second place	1966 Frankfurt	Individual pursuit

Yvonne Reynders (born 4 August 1937) is a former track and road cyclist from Belgium. With Beryl Burton of Great Britain, Reynders was one of the top female riders of the 1960s, winning 13 medals at world championships, including seven gold medals.

Reynders' first sport was athletics: her heroine was Dutch athlete Fanny Blankers-Koen, who won four sprint golds at the 1948 Summer Olympics. However, after her coaches told her that she did not have the speed on the track to follow in Blankers-Koen's footsteps, she initially switched to the discus, winning two consecutive Belgian junior discus titles in 1955 and 1956. Reynders then switched to cycle racing, having ridden a carrier tricycle when delivering coal in Antwerp after leaving school at the age of 16. In order to lose the muscle mass she had built up as a discus thrower, she developed a weekday routine of riding her race bike 40 km from her home in the Campine to Antwerp, where she did her 8–16 km coal round on her carrier trike in the morning, and then riding another 100–140 km on her racing bicycle along the Scheldt valley before returning home. After six months her weight had reduced from 74 kg to 59.5 kg. She subsequently won ten of the 14 races she entered in her first year, and earned selection to the Belgian national team.

Reynders won her first world road title in 1959. In 1961 she won her second, defeating Burton and Elsy Jacobs, and also won the world individual pursuit title the same year. She won two more road world titles, in 1963 on home ground in the Belgian city of Ronse, and in 1966 at the Nürburgring in West Germany, and another two track rainbow jerseys, in 1964 and 1965. She initially retired from competition in 1967, however she returned to racing in 1976 at the age of 39: she took her final world championship medal, a bronze, at that year's Road World Championships. She retired a second time the following year.

Reynders is a pedicure specialist.
