= Tamara Garkushina =

Russian track cyclist (born 1946)

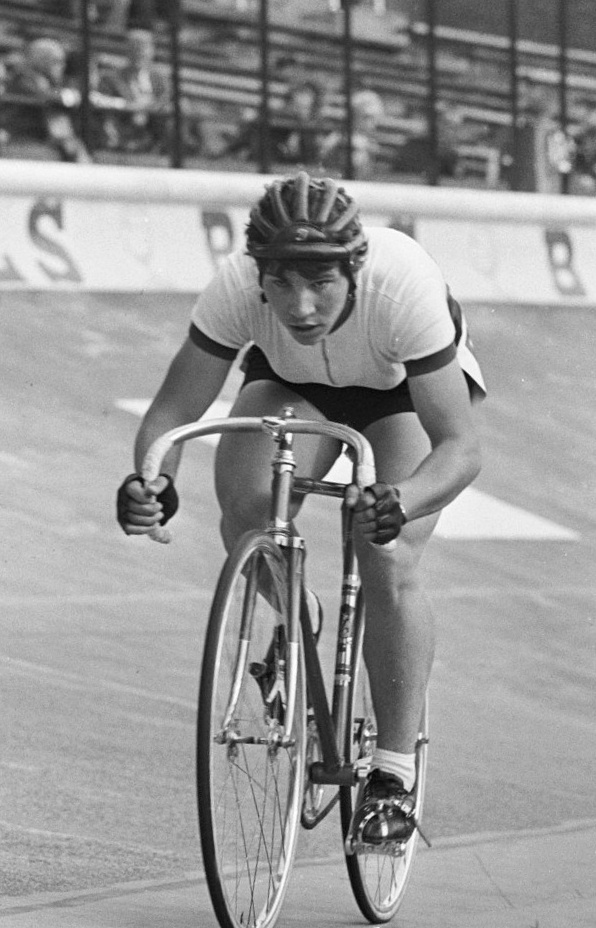
- Tamara Garkushina in 1967

Personal information
- Born: 1 February 1946 (age 80) Lipetsk Oblast, Russia

Sport
- Sport: Cycling
- Club: Dynamo
Medal record
Representing the Soviet Union
WorldChampionships
| Gold medal – first place | 1967 Amsterdam | Individual pursuit |
| Silver medal – second place | 1969 Brno | Individual pursuit |
| Gold medal – first place | 1970 Leicester | Individual pursuit |
| Gold medal – first place | 1971 Varese | Individual pursuit |
| Gold medal – first place | 1972 Marseille | Individual pursuit |
| Gold medal – first place | 1973 San Sebastian | Individual pursuit |
| Gold medal – first place | 1974 Montreal | Individual pursuit |

Tamara Pavlovna Garkushina (Russian: Тамара Павловна Гаркушина; born 1 February 1946) is a retired Russian track cyclist who won six world titles in the 3 km individual pursuit, in 1967 and 1970–1974. She also won more than 30 national titles in the individual and team pursuit events in 1966–1976.

Garkushina was born in a working-class family in a small village in Lipetsk Oblast. After moving to Tula, she graduated with a degree of house painter and decorator and practiced this profession first in Tula (1963–1964) and then in Irkutsk (1964–1965); in parallel, she trained in cycling. After retiring from competition, she worked as a post office clerk (1980–1982) and then as a cycling coach (1982–1985). From 1985 till retirement in 1993 she worked at machinery plants in Tula. In 2010, she became an honorary citizen of the city.
