= Georg Stoltze =

German cyclist (1931–2007)

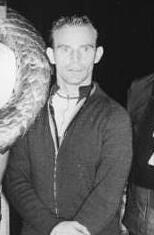
- Stoltze at the podium of the national championships in 1961

Personal information
- Born: 13 February 1931 Erfurt, Germany
- Died: 6 July 2007 (aged 76) Berlin, Germany

Sport
- Sport: Cycling
Medal record
Representing East Germany
UCI Motor-paced World Championships
| Gold medal – first place | 1960 Leipzig | Amateurs |
| Bronze medal – third place | 1961 Zurich | Amateurs |

Georg Stoltze (13 February 1931 – 6 July 2007) was a German cyclist. He won the UCI Motor-paced World Championships in 1960 and finished in third place next year 1961.

Stoltze came from a cycling family. His grandfather, also named George, was one of the founders of the race round the Hainleite. His father, also Georg Stoltze, won a European title in 1928 along with his brother Walter. Stoltze junior was a versatile cyclist, winning more than 250 races on road and track during his career. After retirement he worked for the post office. He died in 2007 after a long illness.
