= Lothar Meister =

German cyclist (1931–2021)

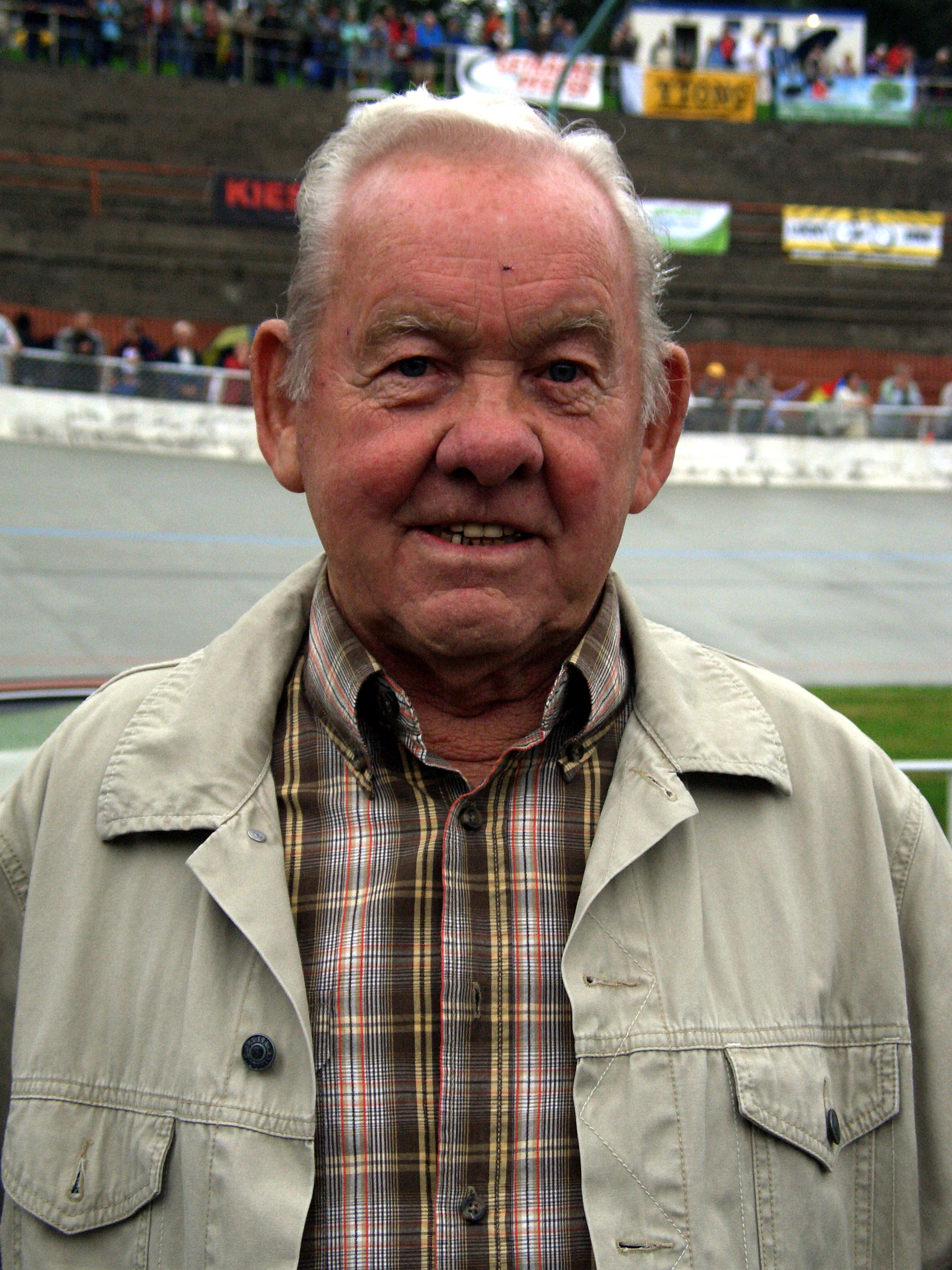
- Meister in 2010

Personal information
- Born: 26 January 1931 Wittenberg, Germany
- Died: 31 January 2021 (age 90)

Sport
- Sport: Motor-paced racing
Medal record
Representing East Germany
Motor-paced World Championships
Gold medal – first place	1958 Leipzig	Amateurs
Bronze medal – third place	1959 Amsterdam	Amateurs

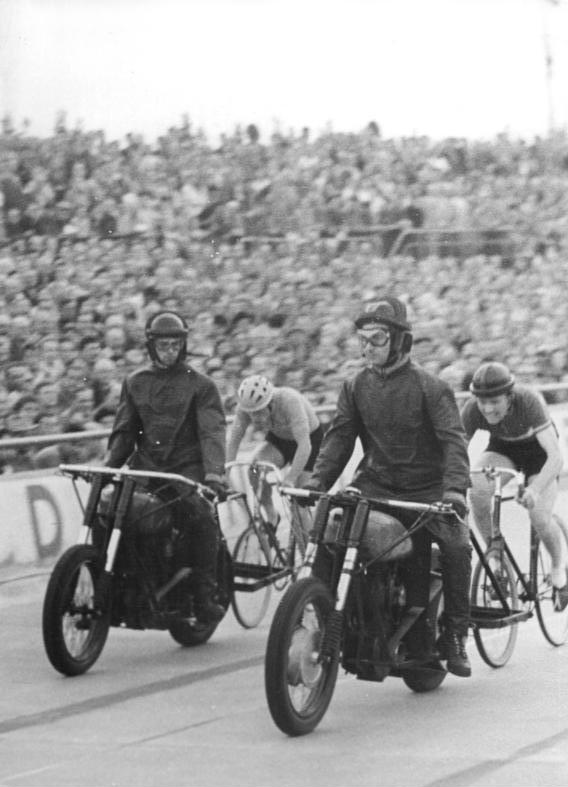
Lothar Meister (right) behind his pacer in 1958

Lothar Meister (26 January 1931 - 31 January 2021) was a German cyclist who was active between 1949 and 1960. He won the UCI Motor-paced World Championships in 1958 and finished in third place the next year.

He should not be confused with another cyclist of the same name who was competing in the same period, in the same area in East Germany (although a few years older, he was known as Lothar Meister II to differentiate between the two).
