= Marcel Delattre =

French cyclist

Personal information
- Born: 17 November 1939 (age 86) Puteaux, France

Cycling career
- Sport: Cycling

Marcel Delattre (born 17 November 1939) is a former French cyclist. He competed in the team pursuit at the 1960 Summer Olympics.
