= Marie-Thérèse Naessens =

Belgian cyclist (born 1939)

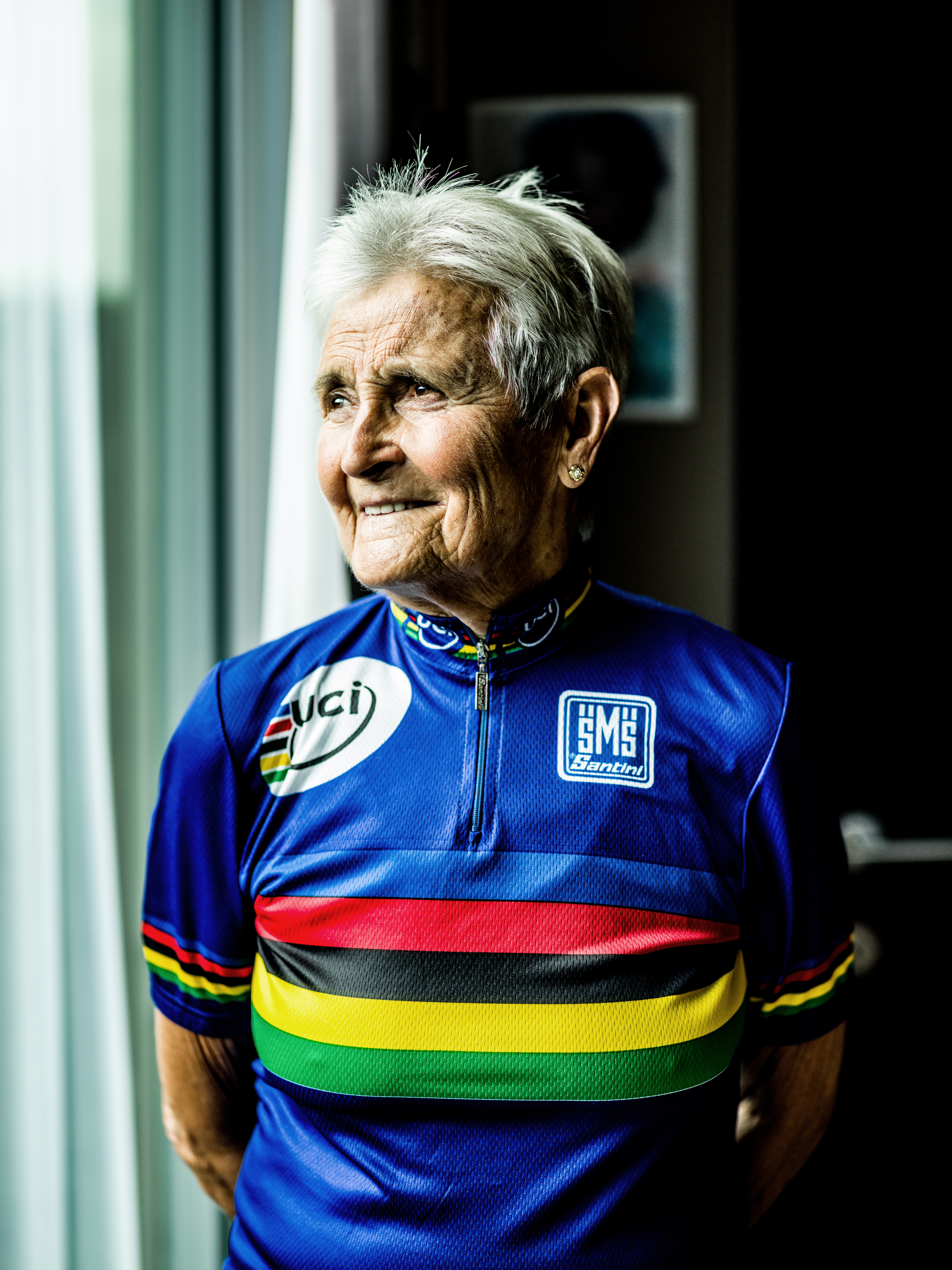

Personal information
- Full name: Marie-Thérèse Naessens
- Born: 12 May 1939 (age 87) Nokere, Belgium

Cycling career
- Sport: Cycling
- Role: Rider
Medal record
Women's track cycling
Representing Belgium
UCI Track World Championships
Silver medal – second place	1960 Leipzig	Individual pursuit
Bronze medal – third place	1961 Zürich	Individual pursuit

Marie-Thérèse Naessens (born 12 May 1939) is a Belgian former racing cyclist. She finished in second place in the Belgian National Road Race Championships in 1965.
