= Guillermo Timoner =

Spanish cyclist (1926–2023)

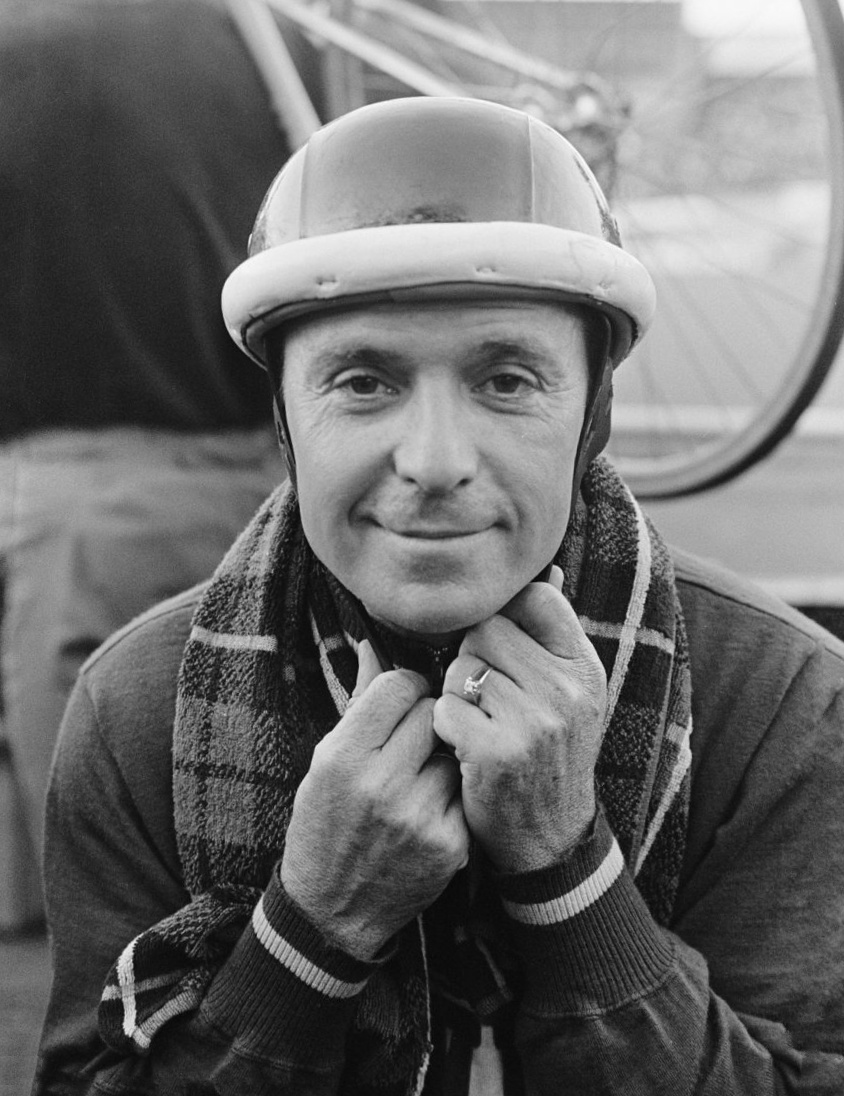
- Timoner in 1966

Personal information
- Born: 24 March 1926 Felanitx, Spain
- Died: 17 August 2023 (aged 97) Madrid, Spain

Sport
- Sport: Cycling
Medal record
Representing Spain
UCI Motor-paced World Championships
Gold medal – first place	1955 Milan	Professionals
Silver medal – second place	1956 Copenhagen	Professionals
Silver medal – second place	1958 Paris	Professionals
Gold medal – first place	1959 Amsterdam	Professionals
Gold medal – first place	1960 Leipzig	Professionals
Gold medal – first place	1962 Milan	Professionals
Gold medal – first place	1964 Paris	Professionals
Gold medal – first place	1965 San Sebastian	Professionals

Guillermo Timoner Obrador (24 March 1926 – 17 August 2023) was a Spanish cyclist. With six gold and two silver medals won in the UCI Motor-paced World Championships between 1955 and 1965 he is one of the most successful motor-paced racers of all times. During his career, which spanned 52 years, he also won 29 national titles in various cycling disciplines.

Before becoming professional cyclist he worked as a carpenter. He won his first competition in 1943 and retired around 1965 to work in commerce. He reappeared as a cyclist in 1983, and in 1984 took part in the World Championships in Barcelona in the masters category. In 1995, aged 69, he won the European Championships, biking a distance of 53.4 km with an average speed of 37.4 km/h.

In 1998 he received the Ramon Llull Award from the government of the Balearic Islands.

Timoner lived in his native Felanitx, Balearic Islands, Spain. His younger brother Antonio is also a former competitive cyclist.

Timoner died in Felanitx on 17 August 2023, at the age of 97.
