= Galina Yermolayeva (cyclist) =

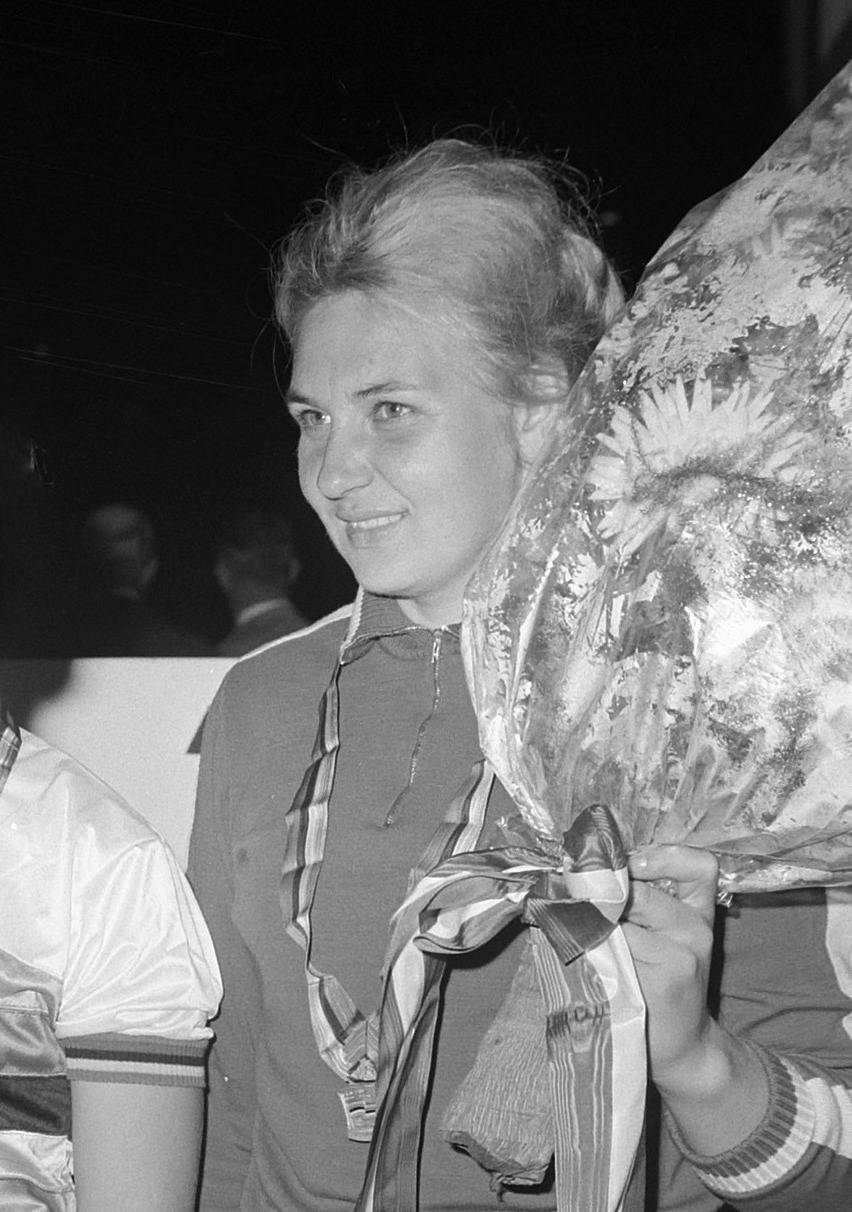
- Galina Yermolayeva in 1967

Personal information
- Born: 4 February 1937 (age 89) Novokhopyorsk, Russia

Sport
- Sport: Cycling
- Club: Trud, CSKA
Medal record
Representing Soviet Union
World Championships
Gold medal – first place	1958 Paris	Individual sprint
Gold medal – first place	1959 Amsterdam	Individual sprint
Gold medal – first place	1960 Leipzig	Individual sprint
Gold medal – first place	1961 Zürich	Individual sprint
Gold medal – first place	1963 Rocourt	Individual sprint
Silver medal – second place	1964 Paris	Individual sprint
Silver medal – second place	1965 San Sebastián	Individual sprint
Bronze medal – third place	1967 Amsterdam	Individual sprint
Bronze medal – third place	1968 Rome	Individual sprint
Silver medal – second place	1969 Antwerp	Individual sprint
Silver medal – second place	1970 Leicester	Individual sprint
Silver medal – second place	1971 Varese	Individual sprint
Gold medal – first place	1972 Marseille	Individual sprint
Bronze medal – third place	1973 San Sebastián	Individual sprint

Galina Vasilievna Yermolayeva (Russian: Галина Васильевна Ермолаева; born 4 February 1937) is a retired Soviet sprint cyclist who dominated the UCI Track Cycling World Championships of 1958–1973, winning 6 gold, 5 silver and 3 bronze medals. Between 1956 and 1973 she also won at least 10 national titles.

She was born in Novokhopyorsk, but after World War II her family moved to Moscow, where her father worked as a taxi driver. As a teenager she competed at the national level in cross-country skiing but then after a frostbite accident changed to cycling. Later for her cycling achievements she was given a car, a personal gift of Leonid Brezhnev.

She graduated in construction engineer and later married Anatoly Vasiliev (Russian: Анатолий Серге́евич Васильев), changing her last name to Vasilieva.
