= Cycling at the 1968 Summer Olympics – Men's team pursuit =

Men's cycling team pursuit at the Games of the XIX Olympiad
- Venue: Olympic Velodrome, Mexico City
- Date: 19-21 October 1968
- Competitors: 84 from 20 nations

Medalists
1st place, gold medalist(s)		Gunnar Asmussen, Reno Olsen, Mogens Frey Jensen, Per Lyngemark, Peder Pedersen	Denmark
2nd place, silver medalist(s)		Udo Hempel, Karl Link, Karl-Heinz Henrichs, Jürgen Kissner, Rainer Podlesch	West Germany
3rd place, bronze medalist(s)		Lorenzo Bosisio, Cipriano Chemello, Luigi Roncaglia, Giorgio Morbiato, Gino Pancino	Italy

These are the official results of the men's team pursuit at the 1968 Summer Olympics in Mexico City, Mexico, held on 19 to 21 October 1968. There were 85 participants from 20 nations.

== Competition format ==
The team pursuit competition consisted of a qualifying round and a 3-round knockout tournament, including a bronze medal race. Each race, in both the qualifying round and the knock-out rounds, consisted of two teams of 4 cyclists each starting from opposite sides of the track. The teams raced for 4,000 metres, attempting to finish with the fastest time (measured by the third rider) and, if possible, catch the other team. For the qualifying round, the eight fastest times overall (regardless of whether the team finished first or second in its heat, though any team that was overtaken was eliminated) earned advancement to the knockout rounds. In the knockout rounds, the winner of each heat advanced to the next round. Teams could change members between rounds.

== Results ==
=== Qualifying round ===
Taiwan (heat 1) and Congo-Kinshasa (heat 2) had teams entered but did not compete.

Rank	Heat	Cyclists	Nation	Time	Notes
1	10	Lorenzo Bosisio; Cipriano Chemello; Luigi Roncaglia; Giorgio Morbiato	Italy	4:16.10	Q
2	11	Stanislav Moskvin; Vladimir Kuznetsov; Mikhail Kolyushev; Viktor Bykov	Soviet Union	4:19.29	Q
3	9	Udo Hempel; Karl Link; Karl-Heinz Henrichs; Rainer Podlesch	West Germany	4:19.90	Q
4	8	Jiří Daler; Pavel Kondr; Milan Puzrla; František Řezáč	Czechoslovakia	4:21.88	Q
5	6	Gunnar Asmussen; Reno Olsen; Mogens Frey Jensen; Per Lyngemark	Denmark	4:23.58	Q
6	8	Wojciech Matusiak; Janusz Kierzkowski; Wacław Latocha; Rajmund Zieliński	Poland	4:23.77	Q
7	11	Bernard Darmet; Daniel Rébillard; Jack Mourioux; Alain van Lancker	France	4:24.45	Q
8	5	Ernest Bens; Ronny Vanmarcke; Willy Debosscher; Paul Crapez	Belgium	4:26.14	Q
9	5	Ernesto Contreras; Juan Alberto Merlos; Roberto Breppe; Carlos Miguel Álvarez	Argentina	4:26.22	
10	7	Heinz Richter; Wolfgang Schmelzer; Rudolf Franz; Manfred Ulbricht	East Germany	4:26.61	
11	7	Piet Hoekstra; Henk Nieuwkamp; Klaas Balk; Joop Zoetemelk	Netherlands	4:27.17	
12	10	Ian Alsop; Harry Jackson; Ian Hallam; Ronald Keeble	Great Britain	4:28.49	
13	9	Walter Richard; Jürgen Schneider; Bruno Hubschmid; Xaver Kurmann	Switzerland	4:28.71	
14	4	Gösta Pettersson; Sture Pettersson; Erik Pettersson; Tomas Pettersson	Sweden	4:30.03	
15	6	Heriberto Díaz; Agustín Alcántara; Adolfo Belmonte; Radamés Treviño	Mexico	4:30.78	
16	3	Luis Saldarriaga; Severo Hernández; Mario Vanegas; Martín Emilio Rodríguez	Colombia	4:31.98	
17	3	David Chauner; Skip Cutting; Steve Maaranen; John Vande Velde	United States	4:32.87	
18	2	Sergio Martínez; Roberto Menéndez; Raúl Marcelo Vázquez; Inocente Lizano	Cuba	4:34.96	
19	4	Robert Farrell; Phillip Richardson; Salim Mohammed; Noel Luces	Trinidad and Tobago	4:48.64	
20	1	Pakanit Boriharnvanakhet; Somchai Chantarasamrit; Boontom Prasongquamdee; Chainarong Sophonpong	Thailand	4:56.80	

=== Quarterfinals ===
==== Quarterfinal 1 ====
Rank	Cyclists	Nation	Time	Notes
1	Lorenzo Bosisio; Cipriano Chemello; Luigi Roncaglia; Giorgio Morbiato	Italy	4:22.48	Q
2	Ernest Bens; Ronny Vanmarcke; Willy Debosscher; Paul Crapez	Belgium	4:26.05	

==== Quarterfinal 2 ====
Rank	Cyclists	Nation	Time	Notes
1	Stanislav Moskvin; Vladimir Kuznetsov; Mikhail Kolyushev; Viktor Bykov	Soviet Union	4:26.63	Q
2	Bernard Darmet; Daniel Rébillard; Jack Mourioux; Alain van Lancker	France	4:30.10	

==== Quarterfinal 3 ====
Rank	Cyclists	Nation	Time	Notes
1	Udo Hempel; Karl Link; Karl-Heinz Henrichs; Rainer Podlesch	West Germany	4:27.14	Q
2	Wojciech Matusiak; Janusz Kierzkowski; Wacław Latocha; Rajmund Zieliński	Poland	4:38.91	

==== Quarterfinal 4 ====
Rank	Cyclists	Nation	Time	Notes
1	Gunnar Asmussen; Reno Olsen; Mogens Frey Jensen; Per Lyngemark	Denmark	4:27.02	Q
2	Jiří Daler; Pavel Kondr; Milan Puzrla; František Řezáč	Czechoslovakia	4:30.76	

=== Semifinals ===
==== Semifinal 1 ====
Rank	Cyclists	Nation	Time	Notes
1	Udo Hempel; Karl Link; Karl-Heinz Henrichs; Jürgen Kissner	West Germany	4:15.76	Q
2	Lorenzo Bosisio; Cipriano Chemello; Luigi Roncaglia; Gino Pancino	Italy	4:16.21	B

==== Semifinal 2 ====
Rank	Cyclists	Nation	Time	Notes
1	Gunnar Asmussen; Reno Olsen; Mogens Frey Jensen; Peder Pedersen	Denmark	4:19.87	Q
2	Dzintars Lācis; Stanislav Moskvin; Vladimir Kuznetsov; Viktor Bykov	Soviet Union	4:20.39	B

=== Finals ===
==== Bronze medal match ====
Rank	Cyclists	Nation	Time
3rd place, bronze medalist(s)	Lorenzo Bosisio; Cipriano Chemello; Luigi Roncaglia; Giorgio Morbiato	Italy	4:18.35
4	Dzintars Lācis; Stanislav Moskvin; Vladimir Kuznetsov; Mikhail Kolyushev	Soviet Union	4:33.39

==== Final ====
West Germany led throughout. At one point, Kissner's hand appeared to touch teammate Henrichs. East Germany (Henrichs was a defector) protested, resulting in West Germany's disqualification. It was initially announced that Italy and the Soviet Union would move up to silver and bronze medals, respectively, but West Germany protested and the judges determined that Italy would retain bronze and the Soviet Union would be in fourth place; however, the silver medal place was at least temporarily vacant. A decision of the FIAC later awarded West Germany the silver medals.

Rank	Cyclists	Nation	Time
1st place, gold medalist(s)	Gunnar Asmussen; Reno Olsen; Mogens Frey Jensen; Per Lyngemark	Denmark	4:22.44
2nd place, silver medalist(s)	Udo Hempel; Karl Link; Karl-Heinz Henrichs; Jürgen Kissner	West Germany	DSQ (4:18.94)

== Final classification ==
Rank	Name	Nationality
1st place, gold medalist(s)	Gunnar Asmussen; Reno Olsen; Mogens Frey Jensen; Per Lyngemark; Peder Pedersen	Denmark
2nd place, silver medalist(s)	Udo Hempel; Karl Link; Karl-Heinz Henrichs; Jürgen Kissner; Rainer Podlesch	West Germany
3rd place, bronze medalist(s)	Lorenzo Bosisio; Cipriano Chemello; Luigi Roncaglia; Giorgio Morbiato; Gino Pancino	Italy
4	Dzintars Lācis; Stanislav Moskvin; Vladimir Kuznetsov; Mikhail Kolyushev; Viktor Bykov	Soviet Union
5	Ernest Bens; Ronny Vanmarcke; Willy Debosscher; Paul Crapez	Belgium
5	Jiří Daler; Pavel Kondr; Milan Puzrla; František Řezáč	Czechoslovakia
5	Bernard Darmet; Daniel Rébillard; Jack Mourioux; Alain van Lancker	France
5	Wojciech Matusiak; Janusz Kierzkowski; Wacław Latocha; Rajmund Zieliński	Poland
9	Pakanit Boriharnvanakhet; Somchai Chantarasamrit; Boontom Prasongquamdee; Chainarong Sophonpong	Thailand
9	Sergio Martínez; Roberto Menéndez; Raúl Marcelo Vázquez; Inocente Lizano	Cuba
9	David Chauner; Skip Cutting; Steve Maaranen; John Vande Velde	United States
9	Gösta Pettersson; Sture Pettersson; Erik Pettersson; Tomas Pettersson	Sweden
9	Heinz Richter; Wolfgang Schmelzer; Rudolf Franz; Manfred Ulbricht	East Germany
9	Luis Saldarriaga; Severo Hernández; Mario Vanegas; Martín Rodríguez	Colombia
9	Robert Farrell; Phillip Richardson; Salim Mohammed; Noel Luces	Trinidad and Tobago
9	Ernesto Contreras; Juan Alberto Merlos; Roberto Breppe; Carlos Miguel Álvarez	Argentina
9	Heriberto Díaz; Agustín Alcántara; Adolfo Belmonte; Radamés Treviño	Mexico
9	Piet Hoekstra; Henk Nieuwkamp; Klaas Balk; Joop Zoetemelk	Netherlands
9	Walter Richard; Jürgen Schneider; Bruno Hubschmid; Xaver Kurmann	Switzerland
9	Ian Alsop; Harry Jackson; Ian Hallam; Ronald Keeble	Great Britain
