= Italy at the 1968 Summer Olympics =

- IOC code: ITA
- NOC: Italian National Olympic Committee

in Mexico City
- Competitors: 167 (152 men, 15 women) in 17 sports
- Flag bearer: Raimondo D'Inzeo
- Medals Ranked 13th: Gold 3 Silver 4 Bronze 9 Total 16

Summer Olympics appearances (overview)
- 1896; 1900; 1904; 1908; 1912; 1920; 1924; 1928; 1932; 1936; 1948; 1952; 1956; 1960; 1964; 1968; 1972; 1976; 1980; 1984; 1988; 1992; 1996; 2000; 2004; 2008; 2012; 2016; 2020; 2024; 2028

Other related appearances
- 1906 Intercalated Games

Italy competed at the 1968 Summer Olympics in Mexico City, Mexico. 167 competitors, 152 men and 15 women, took part in 103 events in 17 sports.

== Medalists ==
=== Gold ===
- Pierfranco Vianelli — Cycling, Men's Individual Road Race
- Klaus Dibiasi — Diving, Men's Platform
- Primo Baran and Renzo Sambo (Bruno Cipolla coxswain) — Rowing, Men's Coxed Pairs

=== Silver ===
- Giordano Turrini — Cycling, Men's 1000m Sprint (Scratch)
- Klaus Dibiasi — Diving, Men's Springboard
- Wladimiro Calarese, Pier-Luigi Chicca, Michele Maffei, Rolando Rigoli, and Cesare Salvadori — Fencing, Men's Sabre Team
- Romano Garagnani — Shooting, Men's Skeet Shooting

=== Bronze ===
- Eddy Ottoz — Athletics, Men's 110m Hurdles
- Giuseppe Gentile — Athletics, Men's triple jump
- Giorgio Bambini — Boxing, Men's Heavyweight
- Lorenzo Bosisio, Cipriano Chemello, Giorgio Morbiato, and Luigi Roncaglia — Cycling, Men's 4000m Team Pursuit
- Giovanni Bramucci, Vittorio Marcelli, Mauro Simonetti, and Pierfranco Vianelli — Cycling, Men's Team Road Race
- Gianluigi Saccaro — Fencing, Men's Épée
- Abramo Albini, Tullio Baraglia, Renato Bosatta, and Pier Angelo Conti — Rowing, Men's Coxless Fours
- Fabio Albarelli — Sailing, Men's Finn
- Franco Cavallo and Camillo Gargano — Sailing, Men's Star

== Basketball ==
Men's Team Competition

- Preliminary Round (Group A)

- Defeated Philippines (91-66)
- Defeated Panama (94-87)
- Defeated Puerto Rico (68-65)
- Defeated Senegal (81-55)
- Lost to Yugoslavia (69-80)
- Lost to United States (61-100)
- Defeated Spain (98-86)

- Classification Matches

- 5th/8th place: Lost to Poland (52-66)
- 7th/8th place: Lost to Spain (72-88)

- Team Roster

- Carlo Recalcati
- Giusto Pellanera
- Gianfranco Lombardi
- Enrico Bovone
- Massimo Masini
- Paolo Vittori
- Gabriele Vianello
- Guido Gatti
- Ottorino Flaborea
- Sauro Bufalini
- Massimo Cosmelli
- Gianluigi Jessi

== Cycling ==
Sixteen cyclists represented Italy in 1968.

Individual road race

- Pierfranco Vianelli
- Giovanni Bramucci
- Flavio Martini
- Tino Conti

Team time trial

- Giovanni Bramucci
- Vittorio Marcelli
- Mauro Simonetti
- Pierfranco Vianelli

Sprint

- Giordano Turrini
- Dino Verzini

1000m time trial

- Gianni Sartori

Tandem

- Walter Gorini
- Luigi Borghetti

Individual pursuit

- Cipriano Chemello

Team pursuit

- Lorenzo Bosisio
- Cipriano Chemello
- Luigi Roncaglia
- Giorgio Morbiato
- Gino Pancino

== Diving ==
Men

Athlete	Event	Preliminary		Final			
Athlete	Event	Points	Rank	Points	Rank	Total	Rank
Franco Cagnotto	3 m springboard	95.92	9 Q	59.78	2	155.70	5
Klaus Dibiasi	3 m springboard	104.68	2 Q	55.06	4	159.74	2nd place, silver medalist(s)
Italo Salice	3 m springboard	87.86	17	Did not advance			
Franco Cagnotto	10 m platform	94.73	5 Q	44.16	10	138.89	8
Klaus Dibiasi	10 m platform	108.04	1 Q	56.14	1	164.18	1st place, gold medalist(s)

Women

Athlete	Event	Preliminary		Final			
Athlete	Event	Points	Rank	Points	Rank	Total	Rank
Bruna Rossi	10 m platform	43.54	21	Did not advance			

== Fencing ==
19 fencers, 14 men and 5 women, represented Italy in 1968.

Men's foil

- Arcangelo Pinelli
- Pasquale La Ragione
- Nicola Granieri

Men's team foil

- Pasquale La Ragione, Alfredo Del Francia, Nicola Granieri, Arcangelo Pinelli, Michele Maffei

Men's épée

- Gianluigi Saccaro
- Gianfranco Paolucci
- Claudio Francesconi

Men's team épée

- Gianfranco Paolucci, Claudio Francesconi, Giovanni Battista Breda, Gianluigi Saccaro, Antonio Albanese

Men's sabre

- Rolando Rigoli
- Wladimiro Calarese
- Cesare Salvadori

Men's team sabre

- Wladimiro Calarese, Rolando Rigoli, Pierluigi Chicca, Michele Maffei, Cesare Salvadori

Women's foil

- Giovanna Masciotta
- Antonella Ragno-Lonzi
- Bruna Colombetti-Peroncini

Women's team foil

- Antonella Ragno-Lonzi, Giulia Lorenzoni, Giovanna Masciotta, Bruna Colombetti-Peroncini, Silvana Sconciafurno

== Modern pentathlon ==
Three male pentathletes represented Italy in 1968.

Individual

- Mario Medda
- Giancarlo Morresi
- Nicolo Deligia

Team

- Mario Medda
- Giancarlo Morresi
- Nicolo Deligia

== Shooting ==
Seven shooters, all men, represented Italy in 1968.

25 m pistol

- Giovanni Liverzani
- Ugo Amicosante

50 m rifle, three positions

- Giuseppe De Chirico

50 m rifle, prone

- Giuseppe De Chirico

Trap

- Galliano Rossini
- Ennio Mattarelli

Skeet

- Romano Garagnani
- Giancarlo Chiono

== Swimming ==
Men's Competition

- Pietro Boscaini, Michele D'Oppido, Franco Del Campo, Franco Chino, Antonio Attanasio, Angelo Tozzi, Giampiero Fossati, and Massimo Sacchi.

Women's Competition

- Mietta Strumolo and Novella Calligaris

== Water polo ==
Men's Team Competition

- Team Roster

- Alberto Alberani
- Eraldo Pizzo
- Mario Cevasco
- Gianni Lonzi
- Enzo Barlocco
- Franco Lavoratori
- Gianni de Magistris
- Alessandro Ghibellini
- Giancarlo Guerrini
- Paolo Ferrando
- Eugenio Merello
