= 1967 UCI Track Cycling World Championships =

- Venue: Amsterdam, Netherlands
- Date: 22–27 August 1967
- Velodrome: Olympic Stadium
- Events: 11

The 1967 UCI Track Cycling World Championships were the World Championship for track cycling. They took place in Amsterdam, Netherlands from 22 to 27 August 1967. Eleven events were contested, 9 for men (3 for professionals, 6 for amateurs) and 2 for women.

In the same period, the 1967 UCI Road World Championships were organized in Heerlen.

== Medal summary ==
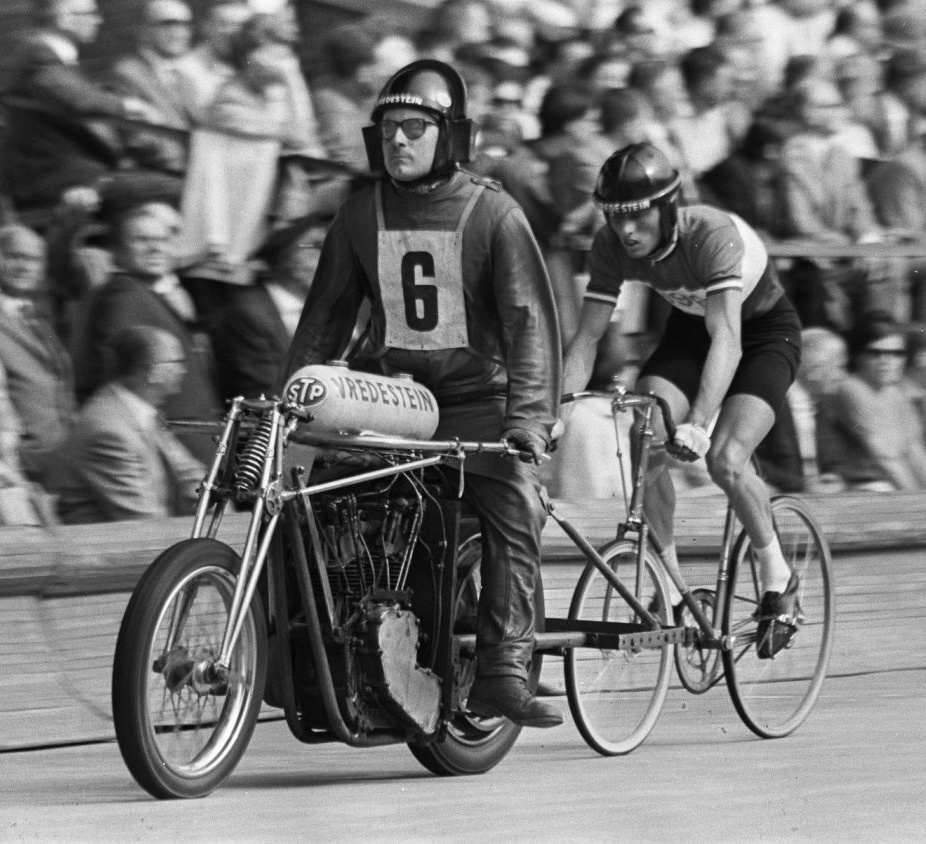
Piet de Wit in the men's amateur motor paced event

Event	Gold	Silver	Bronze
Men's Professional Events
Men's sprint	Patrick Sercu; Belgium	Giuseppe Beghetto; Italy	Angelo Damiano; Italy
Men's individual pursuit	Tiemen Groen; Netherlands	Hugh Porter; Great Britain	Leandro Faggin; Italy
Men's motor-paced	Leo Proost; Belgium	Romain De Loof; Belgium	Domenico de Lillo; Italy
Men's Amateur Events
Men's 1 km time trial	Niels Fredborg; Denmark	Waclaw Latocha; Poland	Roger Gibbon; Trinidad and Tobago
Men's sprint	Daniel Morelon; France	Pierre Trentin; France	Luigi Borghetti; Italy
Men's individual pursuit	Gert Bongers; Netherlands	Mogens Frey; Denmark	Jiří Daler; Czechoslovakia
Men's team pursuit	Soviet Union; Stanislav Moskvin; Mikhail Kolyushev; Viktor Bykov; Dzintars Latsis	Italy; Cipriano Chemello; Antonio Castello; Luigi Roncaglia; Gino Pancini	West Germany; Karl-Heinz Henrichs; Rainer Podlesch; Jürgen Kissner; Karl Link
Men's motor-paced	Piet De Wit; Netherlands	Michail Markov; Soviet Union	Dries Helsloot; Netherlands
Men's tandem	Italy; Bruno Gonzato; Dino Verzini	France; Pierre Trentin; Daniel Morelon	Belgium; Daniel Goens; Robert Van Lancker
Women's Events
Women's sprint	Valentina Savina; Soviet Union	Irina Kiritchenko; Soviet Union	Galina Ermolaeva; Soviet Union
Women's individual pursuit	Tamara Garkuchina; Soviet Union	Raisa Obodovskaya; Soviet Union	Beryl Burton; Great Britain

== Medal table ==
Rank	Nation	Gold	Silver	Bronze	Total
1	Soviet Union (URS)	3	3	1	7
2	Netherlands (NED)	3	0	1	4
3	Belgium (BEL)	2	1	1	4
4	Italy (ITA)	1	2	4	7
5	France (FRA)	1	2	0	3
6	Denmark (DEN)	1	1	0	2
7	Great Britain (GBR)	0	1	1	2
8	Poland (POL)	0	1	0	1
9	Czechoslovakia (TCH)	0	0	1	1
9	Trinidad and Tobago (TRI)	0	0	1	1
9	West Germany (FRG)	0	0	1	1
Totals (11 entries)		11	11	11	33

== See also ==
- 1967 UCI Road World Championships
