= Cycling at the 1968 Summer Olympics =

Cycling at the Games of the XIX Olympiad
- Venues: Satellite Circuit; Agustín Melgar Olympic Velodrome
- Date: 15 –21 October 1968
- Competitors: 329 from 52 nations

The cycling competition at the 1968 Summer Olympics consisted of two road cycling events and five track cycling events, all for men only.

== Medal summary ==
=== Road cycling ===
| Games | Gold | Silver | Bronze |
|---|---|---|---|
| Individual road race | Pierfranco Vianelli; Italy | Leif Mortensen; Denmark | Gösta Pettersson; Sweden |
| Team time trial | Netherlands; Joop Zoetemelk; Fedor den Hertog; Jan Krekels; René Pijnen | Sweden; Sture Pettersson; Tomas Pettersson; Erik Pettersson; Gösta Pettersson | Italy; Pierfranco Vianelli; Giovanni Bramucci; Vittorio Marcelli; Mauro Simonetti |

=== Track cycling ===
| Games | Gold | Silver | Bronze |
|---|---|---|---|
| Pursuit, Individual | Daniel Rebillard; France | Mogens Jensen; Denmark | Xaver Kurmann; Switzerland |
| Pursuit, Team | Denmark; Per Jørgensen; Reno Olsen; Gunnar Asmussen; Mogens Jensen | West Germany; Karl Link; Udo Hempel; Karlheinz Henrichs; Jürgen Kissner | Italy; Luigi Roncaglia; Lorenzo Bosisio; Cipriano Chemello; Giorgio Morbiato |
| Sprint | Daniel Morelon; France | Giurdano Turrini; Italy | Pierre Trentin; France |
| Tandem | Daniel Morelon and Pierre Trentin (FRA) | Leijn Loevesijn and Jan Jansen (NED) | Daniel Goens and Robert van Lancker (BEL) |
| Time trial | Pierre Trentin; France | Niels Fredborg; Denmark | Janusz Kierzkowski; Poland |

== Participating nations ==
329 cyclists from 52 nations competed.

- Argentina (9)
- Australia (9)
- Barbados (4)
- Belgium (15)
- British Honduras (2)
- Canada (6)
- Taiwan (5)
- Colombia (10)
- Congo-Kinshasa (5)
- Costa Rica (5)
- Cuba (6)
- Czechoslovakia (8)
- Denmark (13)

- East Germany (10)
- Ecuador (4)
- El Salvador (5)
- Ethiopia (5)
- Finland (4)
- France (14)
- Great Britain (14)
- Guatemala (4)
- Guyana (1)
- Hungary (7)
- Iraq (1)
- Ireland (3)
- Italy (16)

- Japan (1)
- Lebanon (1)
- Luxembourg (1)
- Madagascar (1)
- Malaysia (2)
- Mexico (12)
- Netherlands (10)
- New Zealand (5)
- Norway (6)
- Philippines (3)
- Poland (10)
- Puerto Rico (1)
- Romania (1)

- San Marino (2)
- South Korea (2)
- Soviet Union (15)
- Spain (7)
- Sweden (6)
- Switzerland (4)
- Thailand (7)
- Trinidad and Tobago (7)
- United States (15)
- Uruguay (5)
- Vietnam (2)
- West Germany (14)
- Yugoslavia (4)

== Medal table ==
| Rank | Nation | Gold | Silver | Bronze | Total |
|---|---|---|---|---|---|
| 1 | France | 4 | 0 | 1 | 5 |
| 2 | Denmark | 1 | 3 | 0 | 4 |
| 3 | Italy | 1 | 1 | 2 | 4 |
| 4 | Netherlands | 1 | 1 | 0 | 2 |
| 5 | Sweden | 0 | 1 | 1 | 2 |
| 6 | West Germany | 0 | 1 | 0 | 1 |
| 7 | Belgium | 0 | 0 | 1 | 1 |
| 7 | Poland | 0 | 0 | 1 | 1 |
| 7 | Switzerland | 0 | 0 | 1 | 1 |
| Totals (9 entries) | | 7 | 7 | 7 | 21 |
