= 1969 UCI Track Cycling World Championships =

- Venue: Antwerp, Belgium; Brno, Czechoslovakia
- Date: 5–9 August 1969
- Velodrome: Sportpaleis; Brno Velodrome
- Events: 11

The 1969 UCI Track Cycling World Championships were the World Championship for track cycling. The events of the men's sprint and the individual pursuit for professionals were held in Antwerp, Belgium the other events took place in Brno, Czechoslovakia. Eleven events were contested, 9 for men (3 for professionals, 6 for amateurs) and 2 for women between 5 and 9 August 1969.

== Medal summary ==
Event	Gold	Silver	Bronze
Men's Professional Events
Men's sprint	Patrick Sercu; Belgium	Robert Van Lancker; Belgium	Sante Gaiardoni; Italy
Men's individual pursuit	Ferdinand Bracke; Belgium	Hugh Porter; Great Britain	Peter Post; Netherlands
Men's motor-paced	Jacob Oudkerk; Netherlands	Theo Verschueren; Belgium	Domenico De Lillo; Italy
Men's Amateur Events
Men's 1 km time trial	Gianni Sartori; Italy	Janusz Kierzkowski; Poland	Klaas Balk; Netherlands
Men's sprint	Daniel Morelon; France	Omar Phakadze; Soviet Union	Peder Pedersen; Denmark
Men's individual pursuit	Xaver Kurmann; Switzerland	Bernard Darmet; France	Daniel Rebillard; France
Men's team pursuit	Soviet Union; Stanislav Moskvin; Vladimir Kuznetsov; Viktor Bykov; Sergeï Kuskov	Italy; Pietro Algeri; Giacomo Bazzan; Giorgio Morbiato; Antonio Castello	France; Claude Buchon; Bernard Darmet; René Grignon; Daniel Rebillard
Men's motor-paced	Bert Boom; Netherlands	Cees Stam; Netherlands	Jörg Peter; Switzerland
Men's tandem	East Germany; Hans-Jürgen Geschke; Werner Otto	West Germany; Jürgen Barth; Rainer Muller	France; Pierre Trentin; Daniel Morelon
Women's Events
Women's sprint	Galina Tsareva; Soviet Union	Galina Ermolaeva; Soviet Union	Irina Kiritchenko; Soviet Union
Women's individual pursuit	Raisa Obodovskaya; Soviet Union	Tamara Garkuchina; Soviet Union	Keetie Hage; Netherlands

== Medal table ==
Rank	Nation	Gold	Silver	Bronze	Total
1	Soviet Union (URS)	3	3	1	7
2	Belgium (BEL)	2	2	0	4
3	Netherlands (NED)	2	1	3	6
4	France (FRA)	1	1	3	5
5	Italy (ITA)	1	1	2	4
6	Switzerland (SUI)	1	0	1	2
7	East Germany (GDR)	1	0	0	1
8	Great Britain (GBR)	0	1	0	1
8	Poland (POL)	0	1	0	1
8	West Germany (FRG)	0	1	0	1
11	Denmark (DEN)	0	0	1	1
Totals (11 entries)		11	11	11	33

== See also ==
- 1969 UCI Road World Championships
