= Denmark at the 1968 Summer Olympics =

- IOC code: DEN (DIN used at these Games)
- NOC: Danish Olympic Committee

in Mexico City
- Competitors: 64 (60 men and 4 women) in 11 sports
- Flag bearer: Erik Hansen
- Medals Ranked 22nd: Gold 1 Silver 4 Bronze 3 Total 8

Summer Olympics appearances (overview)
- 1896; 1900; 1904; 1908; 1912; 1920; 1924; 1928; 1932; 1936; 1948; 1952; 1956; 1960; 1964; 1968; 1972; 1976; 1980; 1984; 1988; 1992; 1996; 2000; 2004; 2008; 2012; 2016; 2020; 2024

Other related appearances
- 1906 Intercalated Games

Denmark competed at the 1968 Summer Olympics in Mexico City, Mexico. 64 competitors, 60 men and 4 women, took part in 53 events in 11 sports.

== Medalists ==
=== Gold ===
- Gunnar Asmussen, Per Lyngemark, Reno Olsen and Mogens Jensen — Cycling, Men's team pursuit

=== Silver ===
- Niels Fredborg — Cycling, Men's 1000 metre time trial
- Mogens Jensen — Cycling, Men's individual pursuit
- Leif Mortensen — Cycling, Men's individual road race
- Aage Birch, Poul Richard Høj Jensen and Niels Markussen — Sailing, Men's Dragon class

=== Bronze ===
- Erik Hansen — Canoeing, Men's K-1 1000 metres
- Peter Christiansen and Ib Ivan Larsen — Rowing, Men's coxless pair
- Harry Jørgensen, Jørn Krab and Preben Krab — Rowing, Men's coxed pair

== Cycling ==
Thirteen cyclists represented Denmark in 1968.

Individual road race

- Leif Mortensen
- Ole Højlund Pedersen
- Jørgen Emil Hansen
- Svend Erik Bjerg

Team time trial

- Verner Blaudzun
- Jørgen Emil Hansen
- Ole Højlund Pedersen
- Leif Mortensen

Sprint

- Niels Fredborg
- Peder Pedersen

1000m time trial

- Niels Fredborg

Tandem

- Per Sarto Jørgensen
- Jørgen Jensen

Individual pursuit

- Mogens Frey Jensen

Team pursuit

- Gunnar Asmussen
- Reno Olsen
- Mogens Frey Jensen
- Per Lyngemark
- Peder Pedersen

== Modern pentathlon ==
One male pentathlete represented Denmark in 1968.

Men's Individual Competition:

- Jørn Steffensen – 4545 points (13th place)

== Sailing ==
Open

Athlete	Event	Race							Net points	Final rank
Athlete	Event	1	2	3	4	5	6	7	Net points	Final rank
Henning Wind	Finn	9	18	10	15	~~23~~	18	19	125	18
Hans Fogh; Niels Jensen; Poul Richard Høj Jensen	Flying Dutchman	6	12	~~DSQ~~	7	12	11	DNF	113.7	16
Paul Elvstrøm; Poul Mik-Meye	Star	3	6	~~10~~	7	5	1	5	50.4	4
Aage Birch; Paul Lindemark Jørgensen; Niels Markussen	Dragon	6	1	2	~~10~~	3	2	2	26.4	Silver medal
William Berntsen; Erik Johansen; Christian Hansen	5.5 Metre	8	11	13	8	13	~~14~~	12	101	13

== Shooting ==
Six shooters, all men, represented Denmark in 1968.

50 m pistol

- Jørgen Gabrielsen
- Niels Dahl

50 m rifle, three positions

- Ole Hviid Jensen
- Per Weichel

50 m rifle, prone

- Ole Hviid Jensen
- Per Weichel

Skeet

- Ernst Pedersen
- Benny Jensen
