= 1966 UCI Track Cycling World Championships =

- Venue: Frankfurt, West Germany
- Date: 22 August - 4 September 1966
- Velodrome: Waldstadion
- Events: 11

The 1966 UCI Track Cycling World Championships were the World Championship for track cycling. They took place in Frankfurt, West Germany from 29 August to 4 September 1966. Eleven events were contested, 9 for men (3 for professionals, 6 for amateurs) and 2 for women.

In the same period, the 1966 UCI Road World Championships were organized at the Nürburgring.

== Medal summary ==
Event	Gold	Silver	Bronze
Men's Professional Events
Men's sprint	Giuseppe Beghetto; Italy	Ron Baensch; Australia	Sante Gaiardoni; Italy
Men's individual pursuit	Leandro Faggin; Italy	Ferdinand Bracke; Belgium	Dieter Kemper; West Germany
Men's motor-paced	Romain De Loof; Belgium	Ehrenfried Rudolph; West Germany	Leo Proost; Belgium
Men's Amateur Events
Men's 1 km time trial	Pierre Trentin; France	Paul Seye; Belgium	Frans Van Den Ruit; Netherlands
Men's sprint	Daniel Morelon; France	Pierre Trentin; France	Omar Phakadze; Soviet Union
Men's individual pursuit	Tiemen Groen; Netherlands	Jiří Daler; Czechoslovakia	Giorgio Ursi; Italy
Men's team pursuit	Italy; Cipriano Chemello; Antonio Castello; Luigi Roncaglia; Gino Pancini	West Germany; Karl-Heinz Henrichs; Herbert Honz; Jürgen Kissner; Karl Link	Soviet Union; Viktor Bykov; Mikhail Kolyushev; Stanislav Moskvin; Leonid Vukolov
Men's motor-paced	Piet De Wit; Netherlands	Bert Romyn; Netherlands	Christian Giscos; France
Men's tandem	France; Daniel Morelon; Pierre Trentin	West Germany; Klaus Kobusch; Martin Stenzel	Italy; Walter Gorini; Giordano Turrini
Women's Events
Women's sprint	Irina Kiritchenko; Soviet Union	Valentina Savina; Soviet Union	Heidi Blobner; East Germany
Women's individual pursuit	Beryl Burton; Great Britain	Yvonne Reynders; Belgium	Hannelore Mattig; East Germany

== Medal table ==
Rank	Nation	Gold	Silver	Bronze	Total
1	France (FRA)	3	1	1	5
2	Italy (ITA)	3	0	3	6
3	Netherlands (NED)	2	1	1	4
4	Belgium (BEL)	1	3	1	5
5	Soviet Union (URS)	1	1	2	4
6	Great Britain (GBR)	1	0	0	1
7	West Germany (FRG)	0	3	1	4
8	Australia (AUS)	0	1	0	1
8	Czechoslovakia (TCH)	0	1	0	1
10	East Germany (RDA)	0	0	2	2
Totals (10 entries)		11	11	11	33

== See also ==
- 1966 UCI Road World Championships
