= 1970 UCI Track Cycling World Championships =

- Venue: Leicester, United Kingdom
- Date: 6–12 August 1970
- Velodrome: Saffron Lane Velodrome
- Events: 11

The 1970 UCI Track Cycling World Championships were the World Championship for track cycling. They took place in Leicester, United Kingdom in 1970. Eleven events were contested, 9 for men (3 for professionals, 6 for amateurs) and 2 for women.

In the same period, the 1970 UCI Road World Championships were also organized in Leicester.

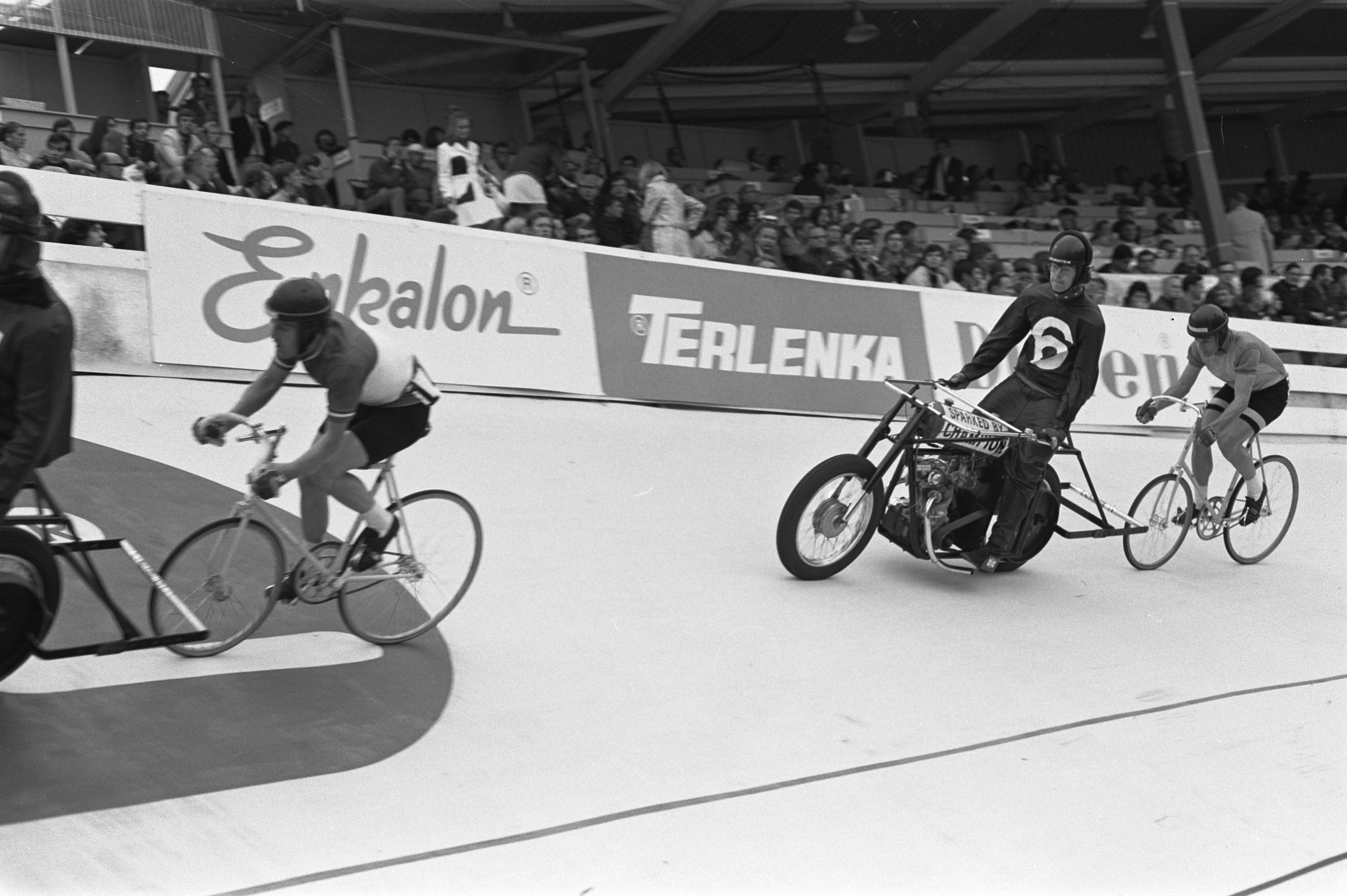
Final of the Men's motor-paced (amateurs)

== Medal summary ==
Event	Gold	Silver	Bronze
Men's Professional Events
Men's sprint	Gordon Johnson; Australia	Sante Gaiardoni; Italy	Leijn Loevesijn; Netherlands
Men's individual pursuit	Hugh Porter; Great Britain	Lorenzo Bosisio; Italy	Charly Grosskost; France
Men's motor-paced	Ehrenfried Rudolph; West Germany	Theo Verschueren; Belgium	Piet de Wit; Netherlands
Men's Amateur Events
Men's 1 km time trial	Niels Fredborg; Denmark	Harry Kent; New Zealand	Anton Tkáč; Czechoslovakia
Men's sprint	Daniel Morelon; France	Peder Pedersen; Denmark	Gérard Quintyn; France
Men's individual pursuit	Xaver Kurmann; Switzerland	Ian Hallam; Great Britain	Viktor Bykov; Soviet Union
Men's team pursuit	West Germany; Günter Haritz; Peter Vonhof; Ernst Claußmeyer; Udo Hempel	East Germany; Thomas Huschke; Heinz Richter; Herbert Richter; Manfred Ulbricht	Soviet Union; Stanislav Moskvin; Vladimir Kuznetsov; Viktor Bykov; Vladimir Semenets
Men's motor-paced	Cees Stam; Netherlands	Horst Gnas; West Germany	Antonio Cerda; Spain
Men's tandem	West Germany; Jürgen Barth; Rainer Muller	East Germany; Hans-Jürgen Geschke; Werner Otto	France; Gérard Quintyn; Daniel Morelon
Women's Events
Women's sprint	Galina Tsareva; Soviet Union	Galina Ermolaeva; Soviet Union	Valentina Savina; Soviet Union
Women's individual pursuit	Tamara Garkuchina; Soviet Union	Raisa Obodovskaya; Soviet Union	Beryl Burton; Great Britain

== Medal table ==
Rank	Nation	Gold	Silver	Bronze	Total
1	West Germany	3	1	0	4
2	Soviet Union	2	2	3	7
3	Great Britain	1	1	1	3
4	Denmark	1	1	0	2
5	France	1	0	3	4
6	Netherlands	1	0	2	3
7	Australia	1	0	0	1
7	Switzerland	1	0	0	1
9	East Germany	0	2	0	2
9	Italy	0	2	0	2
11	Belgium	0	1	0	1
11	New Zealand	0	1	0	1
13	Czechoslovakia	0	0	1	1
13	Spain	0	0	1	1
Totals (14 entries)		11	11	11	33

== See also ==
- 1970 UCI Road World Championships
