= Mogens Frey =

Danish cyclist (born 1941)

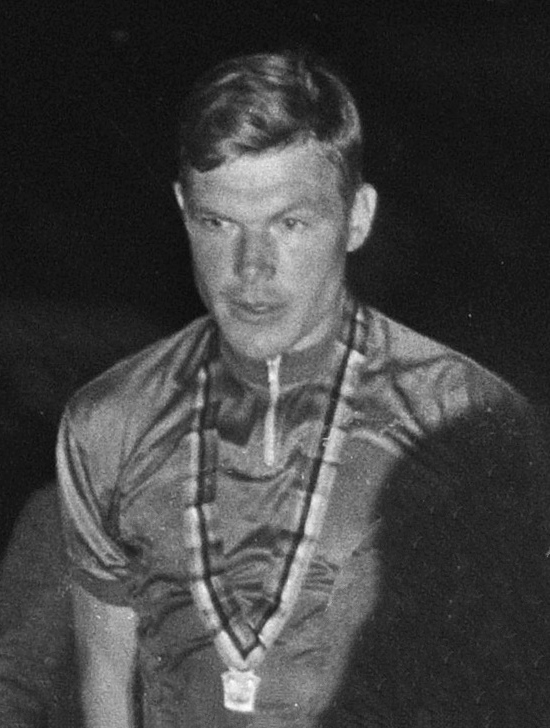
- Mogens Frey at the 1967 World Championships

Personal information
- Full name: Mogens Frey Jensen
- Born: 2 July 1941 (age 85) Glostrup, Denmark

Cycling career
- Sport: Cycling
- Disciplines: Track, road
- Role: Rider

Major wins
- Gold medal 1968 Olympic Games
Medal record
Representing Denmark
Olympic Games
Gold medal – first place	1968 Mexico City	Team pursuit
Silver medal – second place	1968 Mexico City	4000 m individual pursuit
World Track Championships
Silver medal – second place	1967 Amsterdam	Individual track pursuit
Gold medal – first place	1968 Montevideo	Individual track pursuit
World Road Championships
Silver medal – second place	1969 Brno	Team pursuit, road

Mogens Frey Jensen (born 2 July 1941) is a Danish retired amateur cyclist who competed successfully both on the road and on track. He won, along with Gunnar Asmussen, Per Lyngemark and Reno Olsen, a gold medal at the 1968 Summer Olympics in the 4 km team pursuit and finished second individually. However, he is more famous for the way he won stage 9 in the 1970 Tour de France. Here, he defeated his own team captain Joaquim Agostinho. Agostinho was first over the finish line, but was immediately disqualified for putting his hand on Frey's handlebars, thus holding him back in the sprint. It was the only Danish Tour de France stage win until 1983.

Frey also won the individual pursuit event at the 1968 world championships and finished second in 1967 behind Gert Bongers.

== Major results ==
1968
1968 Summer Olympics:

(gold) Team Track Pursuit (with Per Lyngemark, Reno Olsen and Gunnar Asmussen)
(silver) Track Pursuit

World Amateur Track Pursuit Champion
1969
GP ZTS Dubnica nad Vahom
World Amateur Track Pursuit Champion
1970
Tour de France:

Winner stage 9
