= 1968 UCI Track Cycling World Championships =

- Venue: Rome, Italy; Montevideo, Uruguay
- Date: 22–27 August 1968
- Velodrome: Olympic Velodrome; Americo Ricaldoni
- Events: 11

The 1968 UCI Track Cycling World Championships were the World Championship for track cycling. The events for the professional men and women's were held in Rome, Italy. The other events took place in Montevideo, Uruguay. Eleven events were contested, 9 for men (3 for professionals, 6 for amateurs) and 2 for women between 22 and 27 August 1968.

== Medal summary ==
Event	Gold	Silver	Bronze
Men's Professional Events
Men's sprint	Giuseppe Beghetto; Italy	Patrick Sercu; Belgium	Giovanni Pettenella; Italy
Men's individual pursuit	Hugh Porter; Great Britain	Ole Ritter; Denmark	Leandro Faggin; Italy
Men's motor-paced	Leo Proost; Belgium	Piet De Wit; Netherlands	Ehrenfried Rudolph; West Germany
Men's Amateur Events
Men's 1 km time trial	Niels Fredborg; Denmark	Jack Simes; United States	Gianni Sartori; Italy
Men's sprint	Luigi Borghetti; Italy	Niels Fredborg; Denmark	Robert Van Lancker; Belgium
Men's individual pursuit	Mogens Frey; Denmark	Xaver Kurmann; Switzerland	Lorenzo Bosisio; Italy
Men's team pursuit	Italy; Cipriano Chemello; Lorenzo Bosisio; Giorgio Morbiato; Luigi Roncaglia	Argentina; Carlos Miguel Álvarez; Juan Alves; Ernesto Contreras; Juan Alberto Merlos	Sweden; Erik Pettersson; Tomas Pettersson; Gösta Pettersson; Josef Ripfel
Men's motor-paced	Giuseppe Grassi; Italy	Cees Stam; Netherlands	Benny Herger; Switzerland
Men's tandem	Italy; Walter Gorini; Giordano Turrini	Belgium; Daniel Goens; Robert Van Lancker	Japan; Sanji Inoue; Takao Mandarame
Women's Events
Women's sprint	Alla Baguiniantz; Soviet Union	Irina Kiritchenko; Soviet Union	Galina Ermolaeva; Soviet Union
Women's individual pursuit	Raisa Obodovskaya; Soviet Union	Beryl Burton; Great Britain	Keetie van Oosten-Hage; Netherlands

== Medal table ==
Rank	Nation	Gold	Silver	Bronze	Total
1	Italy (ITA)	5	0	4	9
2	Denmark (DEN)	2	2	0	4
3	Soviet Union (URS)	2	1	1	4
4	Belgium (BEL)	1	2	1	4
5	Great Britain (GBR)	1	1	0	2
6	Netherlands (NED)	0	2	1	3
7	Switzerland (SUI)	0	1	1	2
8	Argentina (ARG)	0	1	0	1
8	United States (USA)	0	1	0	1
10	Japan (JPN)	0	0	1	1
10	Sweden (SWE)	0	0	1	1
10	West Germany (FRG)	0	0	1	1
Totals (12 entries)		11	11	11	33

== See also ==
- 1968 UCI Road World Championships
