= Andrea Elle =

German racing cyclist

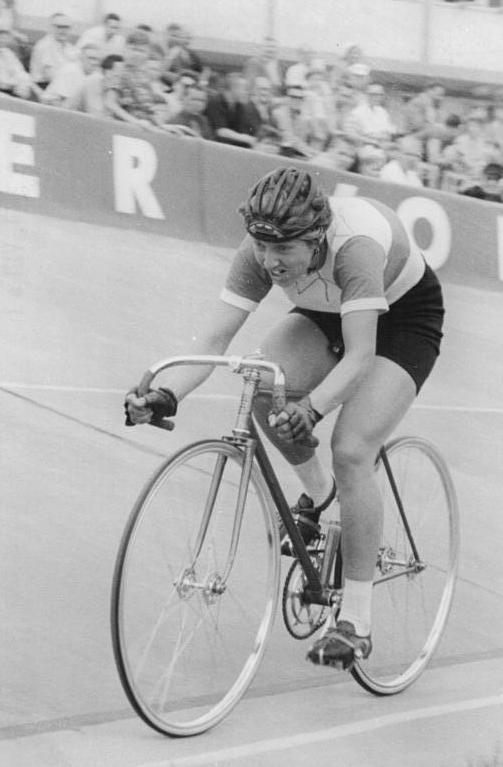
- Elle in 1960

Personal information
- Nationality: German
- Born: 21 March 1940 (age 85); Dresden, Germany
- Spouse: Rudolf Franz

Sport
- Country: Germany
- Sport: Road bicycle racing
- Team: SC Einheit Berlin

Andrea Elle (born 1940) is a former East German road bicycle racer.

== Career ==
Elle started her career as a ballet dancer, handball player, and track and field athlete before eventually settled on cycling.

Elle raced for "SC Einheit Berlin" cycling club. At the 1960 UCI Track Cycling World Championships in Leipzig she placed third in the individual pursuit. In 1963, she won the GDR Road Bicycle Racing championship, after coming second in 1958; the following year, 1959, she was third. She won the GDR track time trial championship in 1960, 1961 and 1964, and placed second in 1962 and 1963. In 1960, she also won the sprint.

== Personal life ==
In 1964, Elle married cyclist Rudolf Franz.

== Sources ==
- Meister-Ehepaar mit hohen Zielen, in: Der Radsportler, hg. v. Deutscher Radsport-Verband der DDR, Ausgabe vom 5. April 1968, Seite 8f.
