= Niels Dahl =

Niels Dahl may refer to:

- Niels Dahl (sport shooter) (born 1937), Danish sport shooter
- Niels Fredrik Dahl (born 1957), Norwegian novelist, lyricist and dramatist
- Niels Lauritz Dahl (1925–2014), Norwegian diplomat
