= Phillip Richardson =

Phillip Richardson may refer to:

- Phillip Richardson (cyclist), Trinidadian cyclist
- Phillip J. S. Richardson, British writer on dancing
- Philip Richardson, British sport shooter and politician
- Philip Richardson (bishop), New Zealand Anglican bishop
- Phil Richardson, member of the Oklahoma House of Representatives
