= Morresi =

Morresi is an Italian surname. Notable people with the surname include:

- Claudio Morresi (born 1962), Argentinean footballer and politician
- Giancarlo Morresi (1944–2019), Italian modern pentathlete
