= Maaranen =

Maaranen is a Finnish surname. Notable people with the surname include:

- Annamari Maaranen (born 1986), Finnish artistic gymnast
- Steve Maaranen (1947–2019), American cyclist
