= Barlocco =

Barlocco is a surname. Notable people with the surname include:

- Enzo Barlocco (born 1944), Italian water polo player
- Luca Barlocco (born 1995), Italian footballer
- Martín Barlocco (born 1977), Uruguayan footballer

Places

- Barlocco Isle, one of the Islands of Fleet, in Galloway, Scotland
