= Rainer Podlesch =

German cyclist (born 1944)

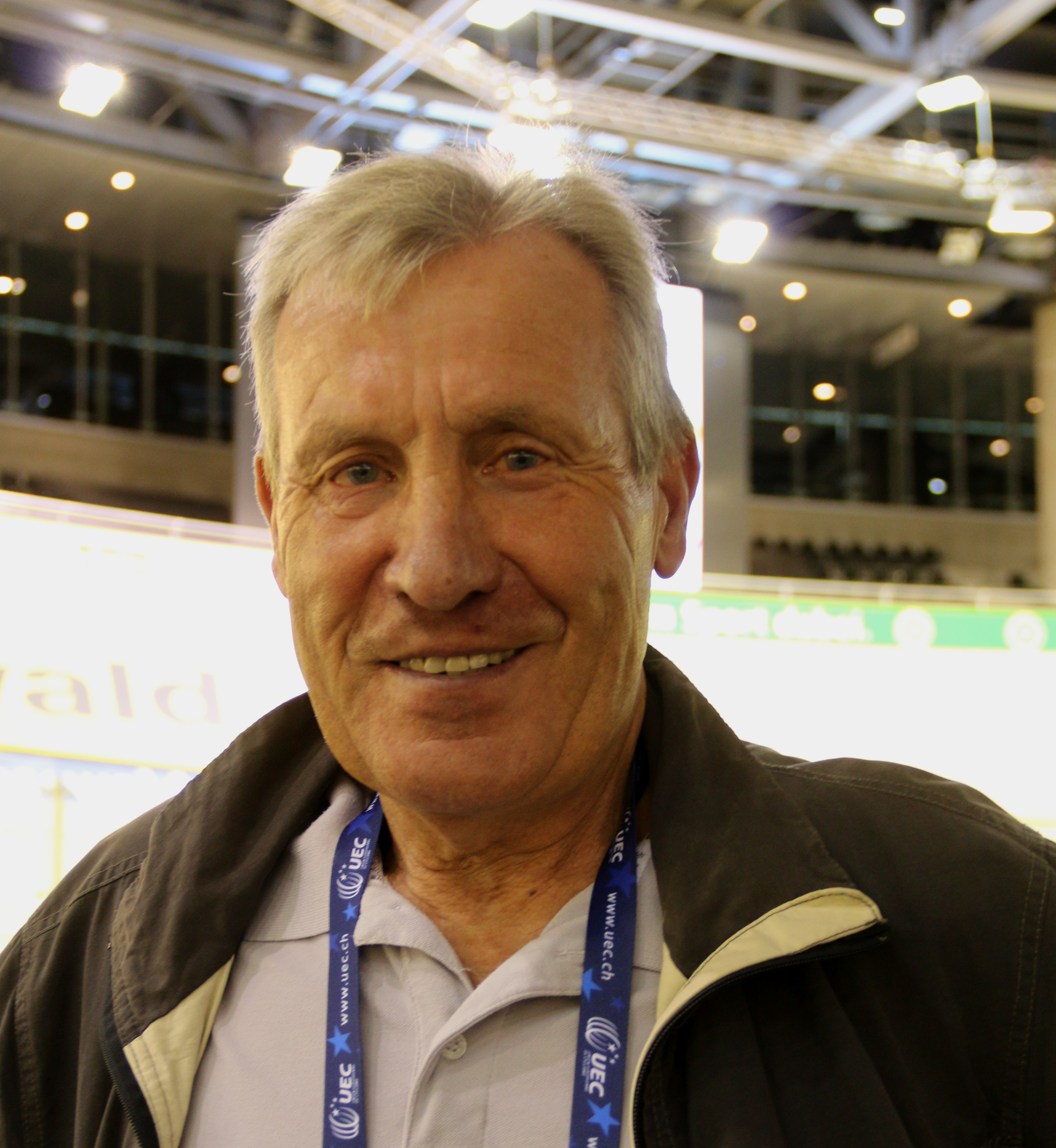
- Podlesch in 2017

Personal information
- Born: 4 November 1944 (age 81) Dobbertin, Nazi Germany
- Height: 1.83 m (6 ft 0 in)
- Weight: 76 kg (168 lb)

Cycling career
- Sport: Cycling
- Disciplines: Cycling, motor-paced racing
Medal record
Representing West Germany
Olympic Games
Silver medal – second place	1968 Mexico City	Team pursuit
Motor-paced World Championships
Silver medal – second place	1971 Varese	Amateur
Silver medal – second place	1973 San Sebastian	Amateur
Bronze medal – third place	1976 Monteroni di Lecce	Amateur
Bronze medal – third place	1977 San Cristòbal	Amateur
Gold medal – first place	1978 Munich	Amateur
Silver medal – second place	1981 Brno	Amateur
Bronze medal – third place	1982 Leicester	Amateur
Gold medal – first place	1983 Zurich	Amateur

Rainer Podlesch (born 4 November 1944) is a retired German cyclist who was active between 1966 and 1983. He won a silver medal at the 1968 Summer Olympics in the 4000 m team pursuit. In this event he competed for the West Germany team in the preliminaries, but was replaced in the final due to injury. At the next Olympics he took part in the 100 km team time trial and finished in 20th place.

He also won eight medals at the UCI Motor-paced World Championships in 1971–1983, including two gold medals in 1978 and 1983.

His son Carsten Podlesch was also a prominent rider in motor-paced racing and won two world titles and his brother Karsten Podlesch competed in motor-paced racing as a pacer.
