= Wacław Latocha =

Polish cyclist

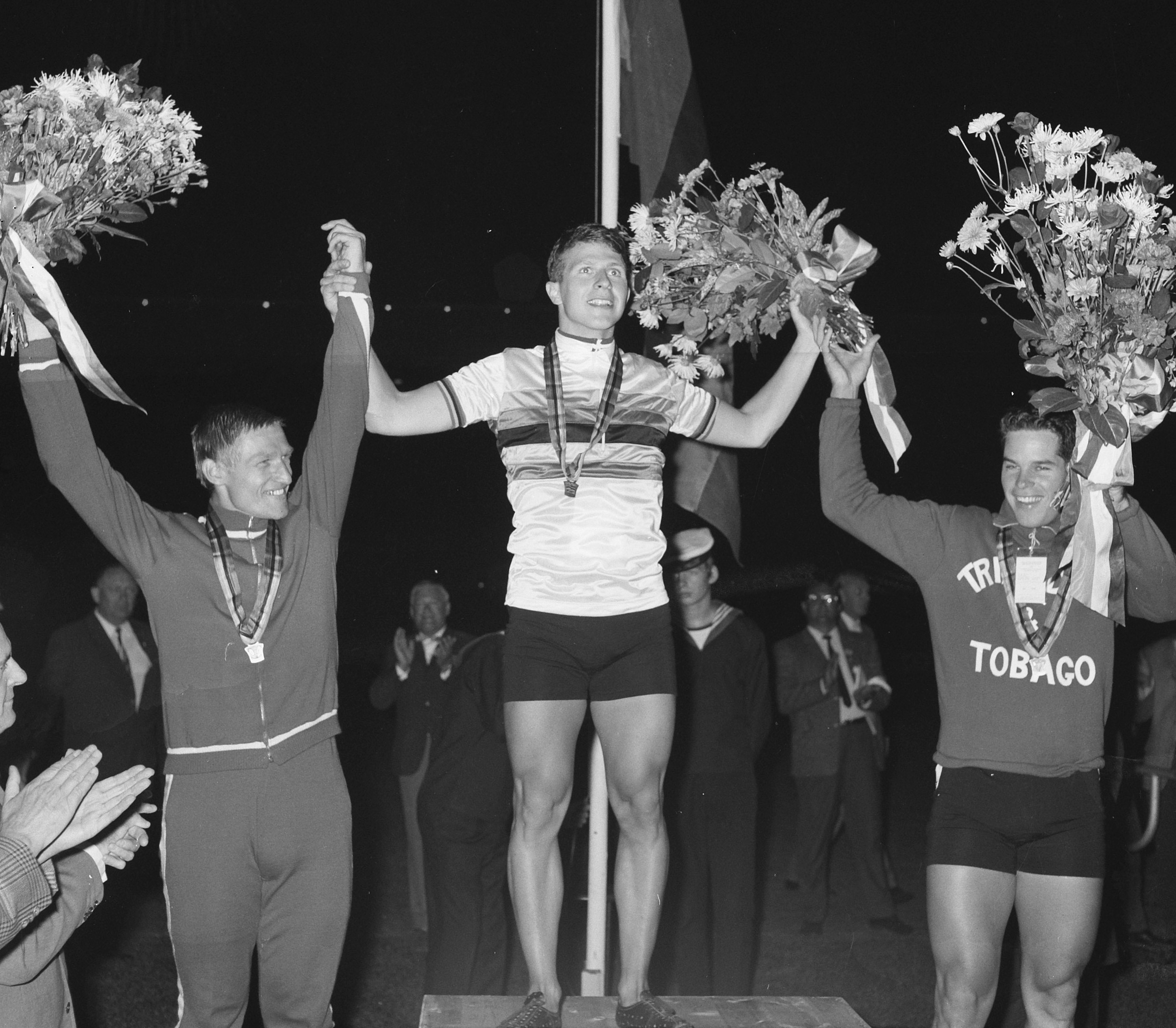
- Waclaw Latocha, Niels Fredborg and Roger Gibbon at the 1967 World Championships

Personal information
- Born: 25 October 1936 Komorniki, Poland
- Died: 27 April 2006 (aged 69) Łódź, Poland
- Height: 1.75 m (5 ft 9 in)
- Weight: 82 kg (181 lb)

Sport
- Sport: Cycling
- Club: Włókniarz Łódź
Medal record
Representing Poland
World Track Championships
Silver medal – second place	1967 Amsterdam	1 km

Wacław Latocha (25 October 1936 – 27 April 2006) was a Polish cyclist. He competed in the 1000m time trial at the 1964 Summer Olympics and in the team pursuit at the 1968 Summer Olympics. He also competed in the 1 km sprint at the 1967 UCI Track Cycling World Championships where he won the silver medal.
