= Ernest Bens =

Belgian cyclist

Personal information
- Born: 5 July 1949 (age 77) Antwerp, Belgium

Cycling career
- Sport: Cycling

Ernest Bens (born 5 July 1949) is a former Belgian cyclist. He competed in the team pursuit at the 1968 Summer Olympics.
