= Severo Hernández =

Colombian cyclist (1940–2022)

Personal information
- Born: 6 November 1940 Guaca, Santander, Colombia
- Died: 15 April 2022 (aged 81)

Cycling career
- Sport: Cycling

Severo Hernández (6 November 1940 – 15 April 2022) was a Colombian cyclist. He competed in the team pursuit at the 1968 Summer Olympics.
