= Wojciech Matusiak =

Polish cyclist (born 1945)

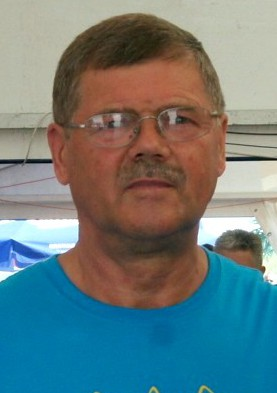

Personal information
- Born: 2 June 1945 (age 81) Sieraków, Poland

Cycling career
- Sport: Cycling

Wojciech Matusiak (born 2 June 1945) is a former Polish cyclist. He competed in the team pursuit at the 1968 Summer Olympics. He won the Tour de Pologne 1969.
