= Willy Debosscher =

Belgian cyclist

Personal information
- Born: 14 February 1943 (age 83) Merelbeke, Belgium

Cycling career
- Sport: Cycling

Willy Debosscher (born 14 February 1943) is a former Belgian cyclist. He competed in the team pursuit at the 1968 Summer Olympics.
