= Boontom Prasongquamdee =

Thai cyclist

Personal information
- Born: 18 August 1946 (age 80) Samut Prakan, Thailand
- Height: 5 ft 9 in (175 cm)
- Weight: 62 kg (137 lb)

Cycling career
- Sport: Cycling

Boontom Prasongquamdee (born 18 August 1946) is a former Thai cyclist. He competed in the team pursuit at the 1968 Summer Olympics.
