= Wolfgang Schmelzer =

East German cyclist

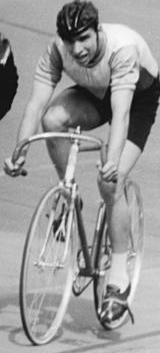
- Wolfgang Schmelzer in 1961

Personal information
- Born: 13 June 1940 (age 86) Berlin, Germany

Cycling career
- Sport: Cycling

Wolfgang Schmelzer (born 13 June 1940) is a German former cyclist. He competed in the team pursuit at the 1968 Summer Olympics.
