= Luis Saldarriaga =

Colombian cyclist

Personal information
- Born: 22 June 1944 (age 82) Medellín, Colombia

Cycling career
- Sport: Cycling

Luis Saldarriaga (born 22 June 1944) is a Colombian former cyclist. He competed in the team pursuit at the 1968 Summer Olympics.
