= Walter Richard =

Swiss cyclist

Personal information
- Born: 13 October 1939 (age 87) Zürich, Switzerland

Cycling career
- Sport: Cycling

Walter Richard (born 13 October 1939) is a former Swiss cyclist. He competed in the team pursuit at the 1968 Summer Olympics.
