= Sergio Martínez (cyclist) =

Cuban cyclist

Personal information
- Nickname: Pipián
- Born: 8 September 1943 Havana, Cuba
- Died: 2 October 1979 (aged 36) Havana, Cuba
- Height: 176 cm (5 ft 9 in)
- Weight: 73 kg (161 lb)

Cycling career
- Sport: Cycling
- Disciplines: Individual road race and team pursuit

Sergio Martínez (8 September 1943 – 2 October 1979) was a Cuban cyclist. He competed in the individual road race and the team pursuit events at the 1968 Summer Olympics.
