= Piet Hoekstra =

Dutch cyclist (born 1947)

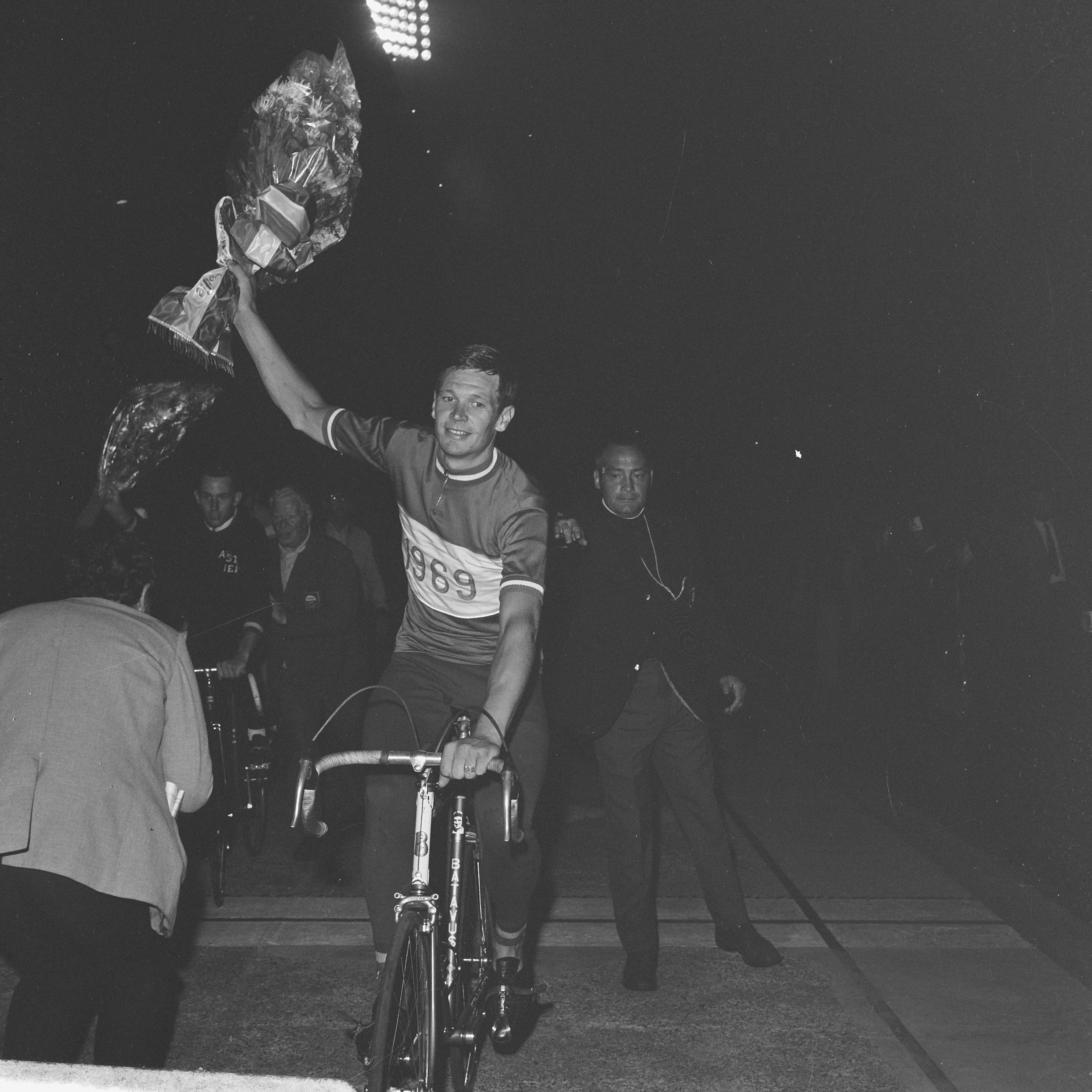
- Hoekstra in 1963

Personal information
- Born: 24 March 1947 (age 79) Leeuwarden, Netherlands

Cycling career
- Sport: Cycling

Piet Hoekstra (born 24 March 1947) is a Dutch former cyclist. He competed in the team pursuit at the 1968 Summer Olympics.

== See also ==
- List of Dutch Olympic cyclists
