= Salim Mohammed =

Trinidad and Tobago cyclist

Personal information
- Born: 9 September 1946 (age 80) Trinidad, Trinidad and Tobago

Cycling career
- Sport: Cycling

Salim Mohammed (born 9 September 1946) is a former Trinidad cyclist. He competed in the team pursuit at the 1968 Summer Olympics.
