= Dzintars Lācis =

Latvian cyclist (1940–1992)

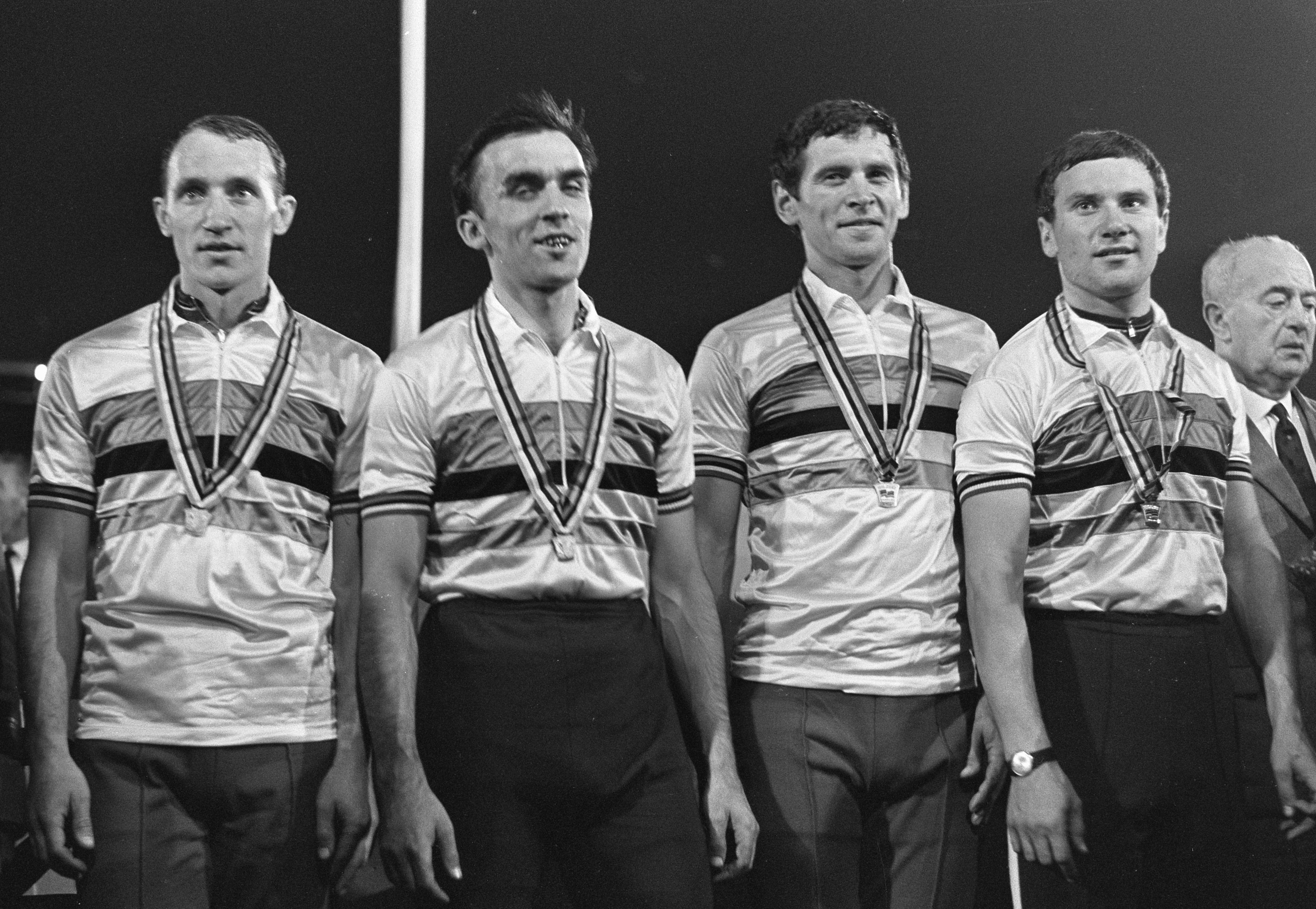
- Stanislav Moskvin, Mikhail Kolyushev, Dzintars Latsis and Viktor Bykov at the 1967 World Championships

Personal information
- Born: 18 July 1940 Jelgava, Latvia
- Died: 17 November 1992 (aged 52) Riga, Latvia
- Height: 1.80 m (5 ft 11 in)
- Weight: 79 kg (174 lb)

Sport
- Sport: Cycling
- Club: Dynamo
Medal record
Representing the Soviet Union
World Track Championships
Gold medal – first place	1967 Amsterdam	Team pursuit

Dzintars Lācis (18 July 1940 – 17 November 1992), also known as Dzintars Latsis (Russian: Дзинтарс Лацис), was a Latvian cyclist. He had competed at the 1964 and 1968 Summer Olympics in the 4 km team pursuit and finished in fifth and fourth place, respectively. He had been part of the Soviet team that won the team pursuit at the 1967 UCI Track Cycling World Championships. Between 1961 and 1969 he won seven Soviet titles in various track (mostly pursuit) events.
