= Pavel Kondr =

Czech cyclist

Personal information
- Born: 25 March 1942 (age 84) Plzeň, Protectorate of Bohemia and Moravia

Cycling career
- Sport: Cycling

Pavel Kondr (born 25 March 1942) is a Czech former cyclist. He competed for Czechoslovakia in the team pursuit at the 1968 Summer Olympics.
