= Brno Velodrome =

Track cycling location in Brno, Czech Republic

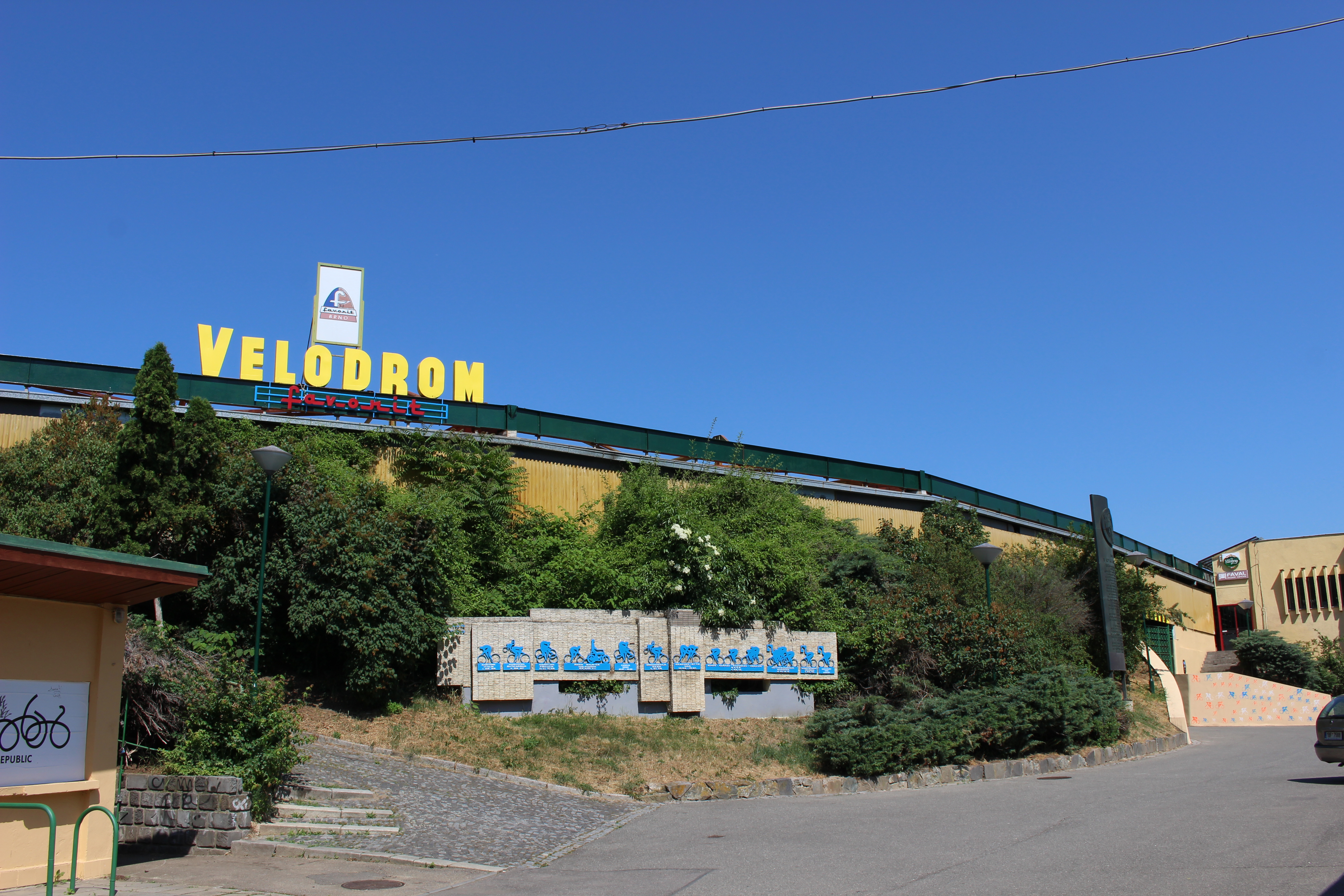
- Interactive map of Brno Velodrome
- Location: Brno, Czech Republic
- Coordinates: 49°11′5.08″N 16°34′44.47″E
- Owner: TJ Favorit Brno
- Surface: concrete
- Field size: length 400m, width 7,4m, max 34 degrees banking

Construction
- Opened: 1889
- Renovated: 1951, 1957, 1967 - 1969
- Expanded: 1967 - 1969

Tenants
- 1969 UCI Track Cycling World Championships; 1981 UCI Track Cycling World Championships; 2001 UEC European Track Championships TJ Favorit Brno

The Brno Velodrome is a velodrome in Brno, Czech Republic. It is a 400 m outdoor covered concrete velodrome with an underpass and lights. The velodrome hosted the 1969 UCI Track Cycling World Championships and 1981 UCI Track Cycling World Championships. The velodrome still has the 1969 look and serves to bicycles club TJ Favorit Brno and it is a site for hosting various concerts and performances. As of 2015 there are still international cycle races taking place.

== See also ==
- List of cycling tracks and velodromes
