= Jürgen Schneider =

Swiss cyclist

Personal information
- Born: 19 December 1949 (age 76) Bern, Switzerland

Cycling career
- Sport: Cycling

Jürgen Schneider (born 19 December 1949) is a Swiss former cyclist. He competed in the team pursuit at the 1968 Summer Olympics.
