= Rudolf Franz =

German cyclist

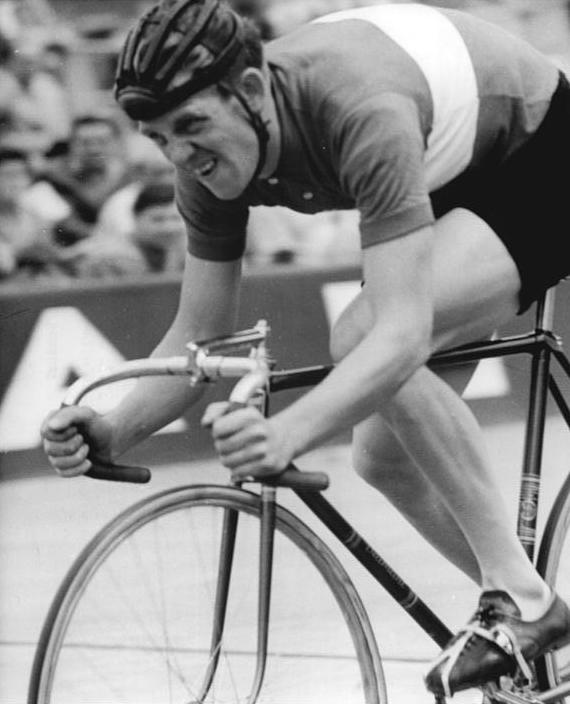

Personal information
- Born: 22 October 1937 Waldenburg, Lower Silesia, Germany (today Wałbrzych, Poland)
- Died: 17 December 2016 (aged 79) Chemnitz, Saxony, Germany

Cycling career
- Sport: Cycling

Rudolf Franz (22 October 1937 – 17 December 2016) was a German cyclist. He competed in the team pursuit at the 1968 Summer Olympics.
