= Paolo Ferrando =

Italian water polo player

Personal information
- Nationality: Italian
- Born: 31 August 1941 (age 83); Genoa, Italy

Sport
- Sport: Water polo

Paolo Ferrando (born 31 August 1941) is an Italian water polo player. He competed in the men's tournament at the 1968 Summer Olympics.
