= Milan Puzrla =

Czechoslovak cyclist (1946–2021)

Personal information
- Born: 18 April 1946 Veselí nad Moravou, Czechoslovakia
- Died: 24 May 2021 (aged 75)

Cycling career
- Sport: Cycling

Milan Puzrla (18 April 1946 – 24 May 2021) was a Czechoslovak cyclist. He competed at the 1968, 1972, and the 1976 Summer Olympics.
