= Henk Nieuwkamp =

Dutch cyclist (born 1942)

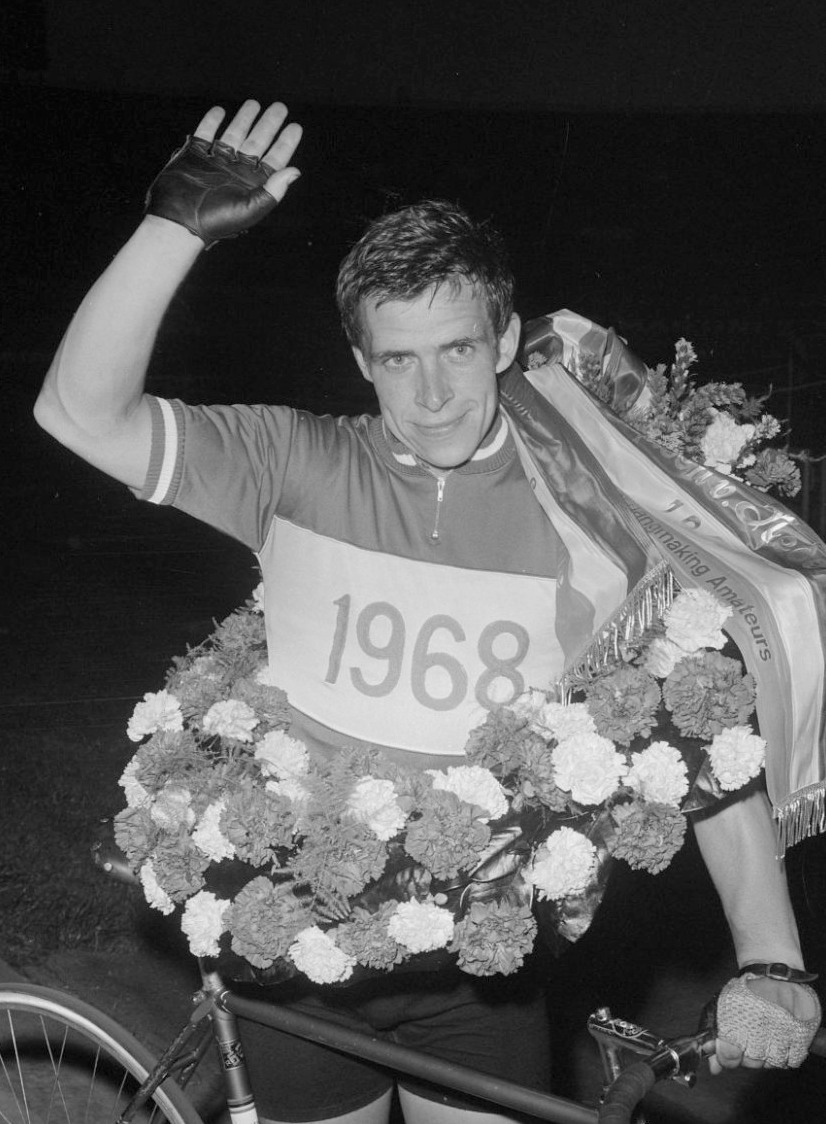
- Henk Nieuwkamp in 1968

Personal information
- Born: 15 July 1942 (age 84) Borne, the Netherlands
- Height: 1.67 m (5 ft 6 in)
- Weight: 67 kg (148 lb)

Sport
- Sport: Cycling

Henricus Everhardus Maria "Henk" Nieuwkamp (born 15 July 1942) is a retired Dutch cyclist who was active between 1959 and 1970. On track he competed at the 1968 Summer Olympics in the 4 km team putsuit. On the road he won the Ronde van Limburg in 1967, as well as individual stages of the Olympia's Tour (1968 and 1970) and Milk Race (1970).

== See also ==
- List of Dutch Olympic cyclists
