= Bernard Darmet =

French cyclist

Personal information
- Born: 19 October 1945 Bouvent, Ain, France
- Died: 6 February 2018 (aged 72)

Cycling career
- Sport: Cycling

Bernard Darmet (19 October 1945 – 6 February 2018) was a French cyclist. He competed in the team pursuit at the 1968 Summer Olympics.
