= John Vande Velde =

American cyclist

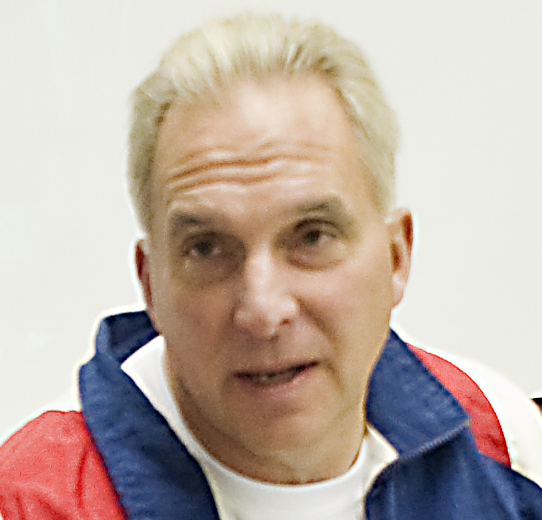
- Vande Velde in 2008

Personal information
- Born: December 27, 1948 (age 77) Chicago, Illinois, United States

Cycling career
- Sport: Cycling

John Vande Velde (born December 27, 1948) is an American track cyclist who competed on velodromes around the world, winning three national championships (4,000 meter Individual Pursuit, 1968-1972), and he competed at the 1968 Summer Olympics and the 1972 Summer Olympics. He was a 2004 inductee into the U.S. Bicycling Hall of Fame.

He grew up in Glen Ellyn, Illinois, racing with the West Suburban Wheelmen, founded in 1959 by family members and friends. His father Al, and Uncles Babe and Henry were active racers from their youth, and John switched his competitive focus from swimming (High School to Cornell University) to cycling. He was one of the youngest members of the 1968 US Olympic Cycling team that went to Mexico City, and a co-captain of the 1972 US Olympic Cycling team in Munich. Following the 1972 Games, he and his teammate Jackie Simes III. turned professional to race Six-Day pro races, soon representing SHIMANO in that European pro race circuit. He and his partner were second in the 1973 Berlin Six-Day.

After retiring from professional cycling, Vande Velde returned to his career, and family's full-time work in road traffic control and management, while staying close to other Olympians involved in promoting some of the largest cycling events in the United States. He and his family constructed a portable wooden velodrome, the Vandedrome, which was used to promote a number of races including in Detroit and Los Angeles.

John is the father of three successful athletes, including Christian Vande Velde.
