= Per Weichel =

Danish sports shooter (born 1942)

Personal information
- Born: 16 April 1942 (age 84) Copenhagen, Denmark

Sport
- Sport: Sports shooting

Per Weichel (born 16 April 1942) is a Danish former sports shooter. He competed at the 1968 Summer Olympics and the 1972 Summer Olympics.
