= Skip Cutting =

American cyclist

Personal information
- Full name: Harry Warren Cutting III
- Born: June 9, 1946 (age 80) Indianapolis, United States
- Height: 183 cm (6 ft 0 in)
- Weight: 80 kg (176 lb)

Cycling career
- Sport: Cycling

Professional team
- Riverside Bicycle Club

Harry Warren "Skip" Cutting III (born June 9, 1946) is a former American cyclist. He competed at the 1964 Summer Olympics and the 1968 Summer Olympics. Cutting is also an artist with works on display with the Art of the Olympians.

Skip was a world-class cyclist whose career spanned more than three decades. He competed in numerous international events including three Olympic Games (did not attend the 1972 games). After finishing his career, Cutting became a world-wide U.S. ambassador for the sport of cycling. Riverside Connection: Winner of Inaugural 45-mile Riverside Bicycle Fiesta (1963) Norte Vista High School (1964) Member of the Riverside Bicycle Club for over 10 years

== Accomplishments ==
- Competed in 28 countries and has no fewer than 297 top-three international finishes
- Brought the Masters World Cup of Cycling Criterium and Track Events to the U.S.
- Held the National Record in the 4,000 meter pursuit (5:21.5) in 1964
- Participated in the 1967 and 1971 Pan American Games
- Member of the 1964, 1968, and 1972 Olympic Teams
- Won the World Masters Road Championship in Austria (1987)
- Silver medalist at the World Masters Games in Denmark (1989)
- U.S. national sprint coach from 1989 to 1990
- Inducted into the U.S. Bicycling Hall of Fame (2002)
- Wore the stars and stripes jersey 11 times as National Champion
