= Phillip Richardson (cyclist) =

Trinidad and Tobago cyclist

Personal information
- Born: 29 January 1949 (age 77) Trinidad, Trinidad and Tobago

Cycling career
- Sport: Cycling

Phillip Richardson (born 29 January 1949) is a Trinidadian former cyclist. He competed in the team pursuit at the 1968 Summer Olympics.
