= Manfred Ulbricht =

German cyclist

Personal information
- Born: 9 September 1947 (age 79) Seelitz, Saxony, Soviet occupation zone in Germany

Cycling career
- Sport: Cycling

Manfred Ulbricht (born 9 September 1947) is a German former cyclist. He competed in the team pursuit at the 1968 Summer Olympics.
