= Giuseppe de Chirico =

Italian sport shooter (1934–2019)

Giuseppe De Chirico
Personal information
- Born: 11 April 1934 Ponza, Italy
- Died: 15 January 2019 (aged 84) Merano, Italy

Sport
- Sport: Sports shooting

Giuseppe De Chirico (11 April 1934 – 15 January 2019) was an Italian sport shooter who competed in the 1968 Summer Olympics, in the 1972 Summer Olympics, and in the 1976 Summer Olympics.
