= Gianni Sartori =

Italian cyclist

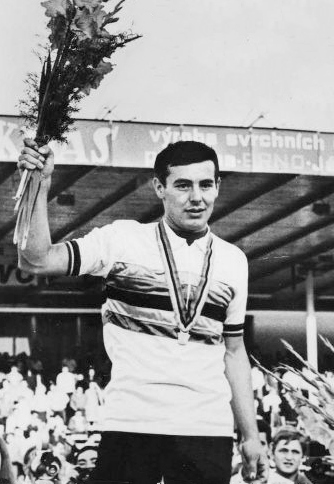

Personal information
- Born: 2 December 1946 (age 79) Pozzoleone, Italy
- Height: 174 cm (5 ft 9 in)
- Weight: 76 kg (168 lb)

Cycling career
- Sport: Cycling
Medal record
Men's cycling
Representing Italy
UCI Track Cycling World Championships
Bronze medal – third place	1968 Rome	1 km time trial
Gold medal – first place	1969 Antwerp	1 km time trial

Gianni Sartori (born 2 December 1946) is a retired Italian track cyclist who specialized in the individual 1000 m time trial. In this event he won the world title in 1969, placing third at the 1968 World Championships and fourth at the 1968 Olympics.
