= David Chauner =

American cyclist (born 1948)

Personal information
- Born: August 4, 1948 (age 78) San Francisco, California, United States

Cycling career
- Sport: Cycling

David Chauner (born August 4, 1948) is an American former cyclist. He competed at the 1968 Summer Olympics and the 1972 Summer Olympics.
