= Steve Maaranen =

American cyclist (1947–2019)

Personal information
- Born: April 14, 1947 Santa Maria, California, United States
- Died: June 16, 2019 (aged 72)

Cycling career
- Sport: Cycling

Steve Maaranen (April 14, 1947 – June 16, 2019) was an American cyclist. He competed in the team pursuit at the 1968 Summer Olympics.
