= Gino Pancino =

Italian cyclist (born 1943)

Personal information
- Born: 11 April 1943 (age 83) Pordenone, Italy

Cycling career
- Sport: Cycling

Amateur team
- 1966–68
Medal record
Men's track cycling
Representing Italy
Olympic Games
Bronze medal – third place	1968 Mexico City	Team pursuit
World Championships
Gold medal – first place	1966 Frankfurt	Team pursuit
Silver medal – second place	1967 Amsterdam	Team pursuit

Gino Pancino (born 11 April 1943) is a retired Italian amateur track cyclist. Competing in the 4000 m team pursuit he won a world title in 1966 and placed second at the 1967 World Championships and third at the 1968 Olympics.
