= Noel Luces =

Trinidadian cyclist

Personal information
- Born: 23 December 1948 Trinidad, Trinidad and Tobago
- Died: 13 March 2012 (aged 63) San Fernando, Trinidad and Tobago

Cycling career
- Sport: Cycling

Noel Luces (23 December 1948 – 13 March 2012) was a Trinidadian cyclist. He competed at the 1968 Summer Olympics.
