= Jürgen Kissner =

German cyclist (1942–2019)

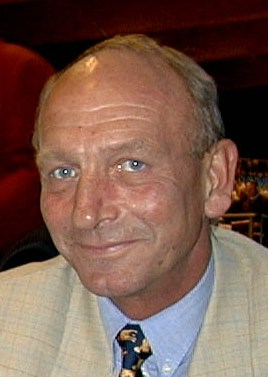
- Jürgen Kißner in 1999

Personal information
- Born: 18 August 1942 Luckau, Nazi Germany
- Died: 18 May 2019 (aged 76) Cologne, Germany

Cycling career
- Sport: Cycling
Medal record
Men's cycling
Representing West Germany
Olympic Games
Silver medal – second place	1968 Mexico City	Team pursuit

Jürgen Kissner (German: Jürgen Kißner, 18 August 1942 – 18 May 2019) was a German cyclist. He won the silver medal in the Team pursuit in the 1968 Summer Olympics.
