= Niels Dahl (sport shooter) =

Danish sports shooter (born 1937)

Personal information
- Born: 1 March 1937 (age 89) Copenhagen, Denmark

Sport
- Sport: Sports shooting

Niels Dahl (born 1 March 1937) is a Danish former sports shooter. He competed at the 1968 Summer Olympics and the 1976 Summer Olympics.
