= Giancarlo Morresi =

Italian modern pentathlete (1944–2019)

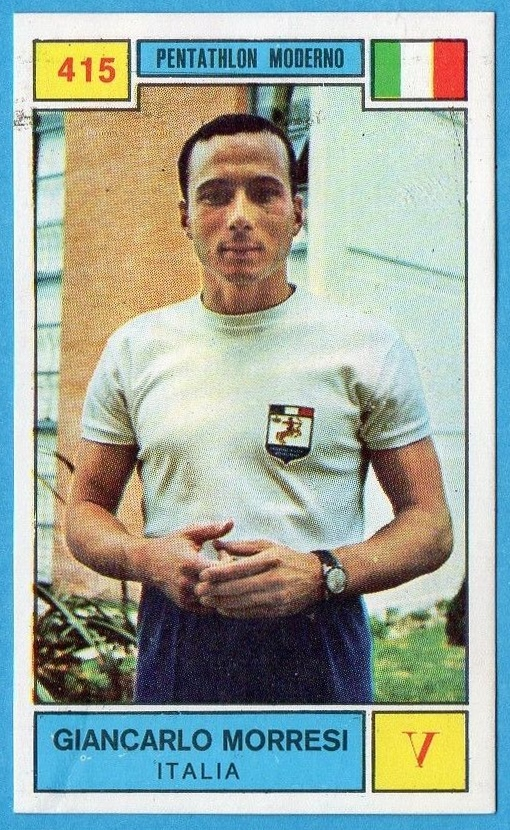

Personal information
- Born: 18 September 1944 (age 81) Rome, Italy
- Died: 30 July 2019 (aged 74)
- Height: 171 cm (5 ft 7 in)
- Weight: 68 kg (150 lb)

Sport
- Sport: Modern pentathlon

Giancarlo Morresi (18 September 1944 – 30 July 2019) was an Italian modern pentathlete. He finished 24th individually and ninth with the team at the 1968 Summer Olympics.
