= Hugh Porter =

British cyclist

Hugh Porter MBE
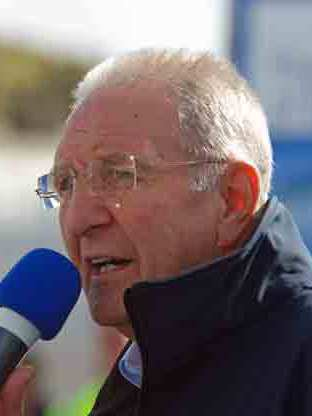
- Porter in 2010

Personal information
- Full name: Hugh William Porter
- Nicknames: Hughie, The Locomotive
- Born: 27 January 1940 (age 86) Wolverhampton, England
- Height: 1.85 m (6 ft 1 in)
- Weight: 71 kg (157 lb)

Cycling career
- Sport: Cycling
- Current team: Retired
- Disciplines: Road & Track
- Role: Rider, Road-Captain
- Rider type: Endurance

Amateur team
- 1956–1966: Wolverhampton Wheelers

Professional teams
- 1967: Condor Mackeson
- 1970s: Bantel

Major wins
- World Championship individual pursuit 1968, 1970, 1972, 1973; Commonwealth Games individual pursuit 1966; UK National individual pursuit, 1963, 1964, 1965; UK National team pursuit, 1959; UK Professional individual pursuit, 1967; Tour of the West, 2 stage wins – 1968; Tour of Britain, 1 stage – 1966, Star Trophy series 1966
Medal record
Men's track cycling
Representing Great Britain
World Championships
Bronze medal – third place	1963 Liège	Pursuit
Silver medal – second place	1967 Amsterdam	Pursuit
Gold medal – first place	1968 Rome	Pursuit
Silver medal – second place	1969 Antwerpen	Pursuit
Gold medal – first place	1970 Leicester	Pursuit
Bronze medal – third place	1971 Varese	Pursuit
Gold medal – first place	1972 Marseille	Pursuit
Gold medal – first place	1973 San Sebastián	Pursuit
Representing England
Commonwealth Games
Gold medal – first place	1966 Kingston	Pursuit

Hugh William Porter MBE (born 27 January 1940) is one of Britain's greatest former professional cyclists, winning four world titles in the individual pursuit as well as a Commonwealth Games gold medal in 1966. He later became a commentator on cycling events, working most notably for BBC Sport and ITV.

== Personal life ==
Porter was born and raised in Wolverhampton and educated at the city's St Peter's Collegiate School. His father, Joe, was a cyclist and at 10, Hugh was taken to the Halesowen Velodrome to watch British sprint world champion Reg Harris.

In his earlier working life outside professional cycling commitments he was employed as a draughtsman at Chubb Locks in Willenhall.

He is married to British Olympic swimming gold medallist, Anita Lonsbrough; they met while travelling to Tokyo for the 1964 Summer Olympics and married in 1965.

== Cycling career ==
=== Junior career ===
Aged 16, Porter began racing as a junior for Wolverhampton Wheelers cycling club, finishing third in his first road race. He also became a regular competitor in weekly track league meetings at Wolverhampton’s Aldersley Stadium cycle track.

=== Senior competition ===
As a senior, he won his first race in July 1958 and by the end of the season another victory and other high placings led to a first-category licence for the 1959 season. First was the highest of three classes dependent on racing successes. Six victories came that season on the road, along with a gold medal on the track as part of his club's team pursuit squad at the national track championships at the Fallowfield Stadium, Manchester. He also won the Midlands title in the individual pursuit, but remained focused on developing as a road racer.

In the early 1960s he represented Great Britain in the Tour of Czechoslovakia in 1961 (26th overall) and in the Tour of Ireland. He also finished second that year in the season-long Star Trophy points competition assessed by results in set races through a season, and 17th in his first ride in the Tour of Britain. A year later he was 20th in the same event, and earned selection for the 1962 world championships in Italy to ride both the road race and team time trial events. However, over-exertion in the time trial led to a poor performance in the road race.

=== First national track title ===
Porter still dabbled in track racing and in 1963 performed well in the individual pursuit at Aldersley Stadium's Easter international meeting, before winning the final 10-mile scratch race. Encouraged, Porter began to consider contesting the national individual pursuit championship. In the meantime, he also raced in the national 25-mile individual time trial championship in Gloucestershire, finishing second. The individual pursuit championship was decided at Fallowfield Stadium; Porter was the fastest qualifier and, although headed in the early stages of the final, soon eased into the lead to beat Harry Jackson and win his first individual national title. Porter then travelled to the Rocourt velodrome, in Belgium, for the 1963 world championship, where he reached the semi-final, to be pipped by 0.18 seconds by Belgian Jean Walschaerts for a place in the final. He won the third-place ride-off to take a bronze medal.

=== Olympic disappointment ===
1964 was dominated by thoughts of the Olympic Games in Tokyo where Porter was already selected to ride the pursuit, though he still defended his British championship, emerging victorious at Herne Hill and shaving almost a second off the championship record. He also tested himself in the national 10-mile time-trial championship, finishing second, and was a member of the Wolverhampton Wheelers squad which won the national team pursuit title. However, while Porter qualified fifth fastest in Tokyo, he was suffering from a cold and was eliminated at the quarter-final stage, and went home without a medal, but he did meet his future wife, fellow Olympian and swimmer Anita Lonsbrough whom he married in Huddersfield on 17 June 1965.

While Porter retained his British individual pursuit title and won several road races, 1965 was otherwise not memorable. He was defeated in the quarter-finals of the world pursuit championship in Spain (a timetable change meant he almost missed the contest, and, without his normal pre-race routine, he was narrowly defeated by Colombian Martin Rodriguez in the fastest race of the event).

=== Commonwealth champion ===
However, 1966 proved more successful. Porter began with 12 successive road race victories, and won a pursuit match in the Good Friday meeting at Herne Hill. He then rode the Tour of Britain, winning one stage, finishing second on three other stages, taking ninth place overall and second place in the points classification. His road victories assured him of victory in the season-long Star Trophy series. Without any further track races, he travelled to Jamaica for the 1966 Commonwealth Games, where he set a games record in qualifying for the semi-final of the individual pursuit, and then beat Australian Jan Bylsma in the final to take the gold medal.

=== First professional steps ===
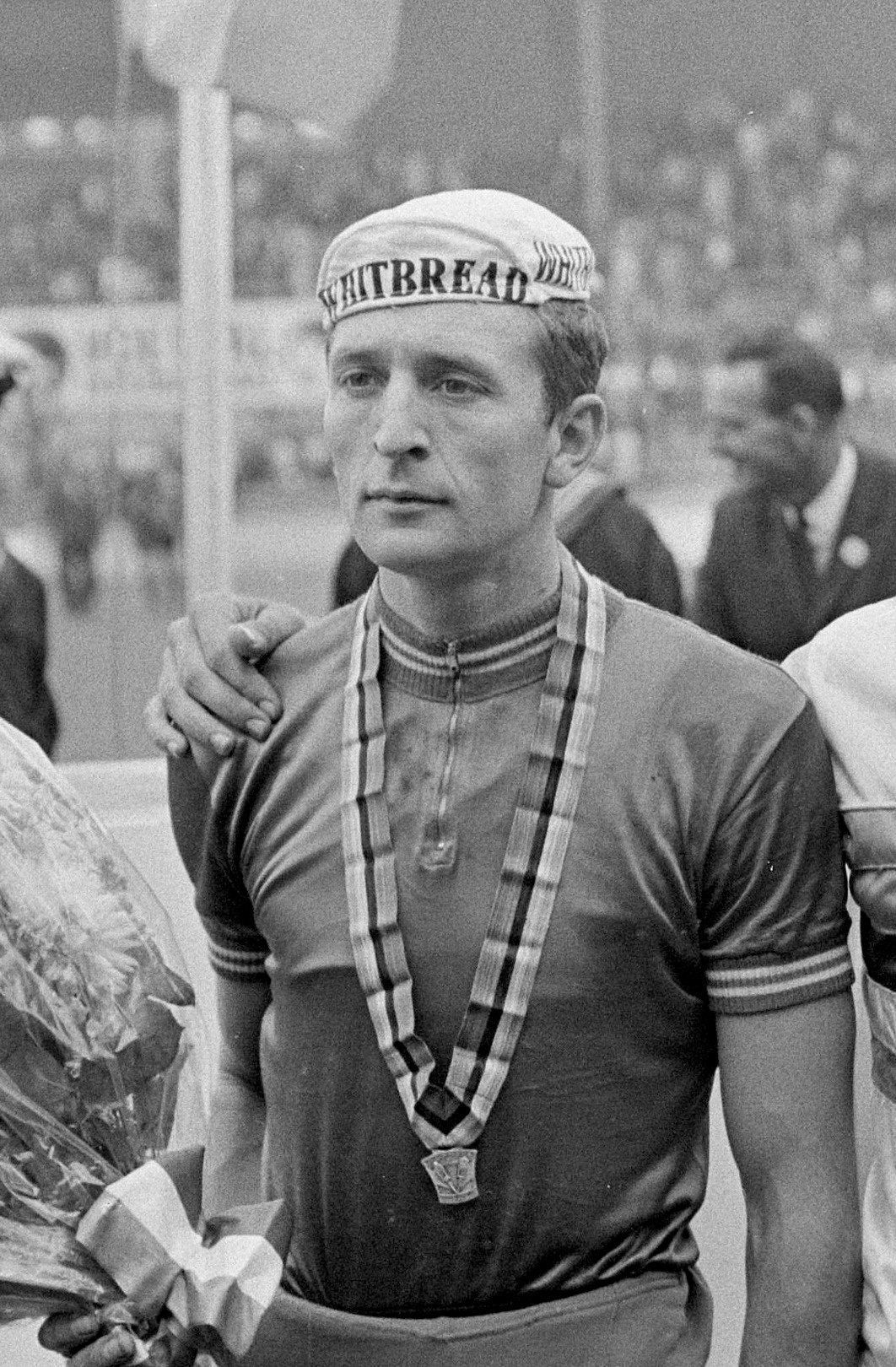
Hugh Porter at the 1967 World Championships

In early 1967 Porter turned professional, riding for the Condor Mackeson team. The step up to the professional ranks meant that in the individual pursuit he was now racing 5,000m instead of 4,000m, but in his first test at the distance, he emerged victorious, beating Dave Bonner to win the professional title in Leicester. Porter was then selected to race in the world professional pursuit event in Amsterdam. Porter qualified for the final, but, unsettled by a puncture to his opponent, Tiemen Groen, that forced a re-run, he was beaten by two seconds. Nonetheless, his silver medal led to contracts from track promoters, including an invitation to ride the London six-day race – his first. He crashed on the fourth day, breaking his collar bone, and missed contracts for other six-day races. However, he recovered and spent much of the winter track-racing in Belgium, finishing the Antwerp six-day before returning to England for the start of the 1968 road season.

=== Professional success ===
Porter began 1968 with a time-trial stage victory and second place overall in a three-day race in Bournemouth, plus two stage wins and sixth overall in the Tour of the West. He was then selected for the British team to ride the Tour de France. Having retained his British pursuit title, he was expected to do well in the prologue time trial – and finished seventh of 120 starters. However, an injury returned and he abandoned on the third stage – a retirement that allowed him to concentrate on the world championship in Rome in late August.

He was the fastest qualifier, and recorded his fastest time of the championship in the quarter final, beating Siegfried Adler, then holder of the world professional indoor hour record. In the final, Porter faced Ole Ritter, later holder of the outdoor hour record, of Denmark and beat him by eight seconds to win his first world title, an achievement that merited the Bidlake Memorial Prize for 1968.

The following year Porter again qualified for the final of the individual pursuit at the Worlds in Antwerp, however he was defeated by Ferdinand Bracke, who started the final quickly and caught Porter within a dozen laps. Porter regained his title in 1970 on home soil when the Worlds were held at Saffron Lane sports centre in Leicester, setting the fastest time in qualifying by seven seconds and beating Lorenzo Bosisio in the final by eleven seconds. At the 1971 Worlds in Varese, Porter finished third, prompting rival Dirk Baert to claim: "Porter is finished, he is an old man". However Porter rebounded the following year to take his third individual pursuit title at the Worlds in Marseille, defeating Bracke, despite Bracke holding a two and a half second lead by lap seven. Porter described this as his "most cherished" world championship: "I beat Bracke, the rider I had the most respect for... He held the Hour record, finished third in the Tour de France and won the Vuelta. He was some rider". In 1973 Porter took his fourth world title in San Sebastian, qualifying fastest and catching Martín Rodríguez in the quarter-finals (gaining revenge for the 1965 Amateur World Championships, also in San Sebastian, where Porter had also qualified fastest but had been knocked out by Rodríguez in the next round) before beating Mogens Frey in the semis and defeating René Pijnen by ten seconds in the final after trailing him with seven laps remaining.

== Commentary work ==
Porter is a TV commentator and public-address commentator at events. He started his broadcasting career at BBC Radio Birmingham. He has often worked for BBC Sport and ITV Sport and has voiced the Olympic and Commonwealth Games (track and road), World Championships (track and road) and World Cup track meetings. He commentated on cycling at every Olympics from the 1984 Games in Los Angeles to the 2012 Games in London.

He commentated on the 2009 Tour of Britain for ITV4, while also public-address commentator. Porter kept referring to the 'stage announcer', which was himself. Porter is a regular at Manchester and Newport velodromes. He is the voice of the Revolution series at Manchester.

He has also worked on the Winter Olympics for the BBC, where he commentated on the speed skating events.

Hugh has joined forces with British Swimming and is now "the voice of British Swimming", commentating at all the major events throughout the year. He is often assisted by his wife Anita Lonsbrough who sits alongside him off-microphone and helps him with his notes.

== Honours ==
=== The Golden Book ===
Porter's achievements were celebrated in 1972 when Cycling Weekly awarded him his own page in the Golden Book of Cycling.

=== Order of the British Empire ===
In the 1973 New Year Honours, Porter was appointed Member of the Order of the British Empire (MBE), for services to cycling.

=== Other honours ===
Porter was presented with an award for Outstanding Contribution to Cycling at the World Track Championships in Manchester in March 2008.

In 2009, he was inducted into the British Cycling Hall of Fame.

Porter was made Freeman of the City of Wolverhampton in 2009 and there is a road named after him in Aldersley, Wolverhampton ("Hugh Porter Way" which leads to Aldersley Leisure Village, where Porter's old club, Wolverhampton Wheelers CC, is based and uses the velodrome). He has also received an honorary degree from the University of Wolverhampton.

Porter is honorary patron of Halesowen Athletic and Cycling Club.

In 2015, Porter was awarded the Outstanding Contribution to Sport award at the Black Country Sport & Physical Activity awards hosted by the Black Country BeActive Partnership where, accompanied by his wife Anita, he received a standing ovation on receiving the honour.
