= Cipriano Chemello =

Italian cyclist

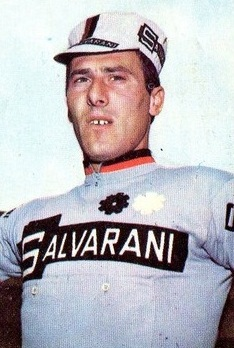

Personal information
- Born: 19 July 1945 Crespano, Italy
- Died: 14 February 2017 (aged 71)
- Height: 1.74 m (5 ft 8 1/2 in)
- Weight: 74 kg (163 lb)

Cycling career
- Sport: Cycling
Medal record
Representing Italy
Summer Olympics
Bronze medal – third place	1968 Mexico City	Team pursuit
Track Cycling World Championships
Gold medal – first place	1966 Frankfurt	Team pursuit
Gold medal – first place	1968 Montevideo	Team pursuit
Silver medal – second place	1965 San Sebastián	Team pursuit
Silver medal – second place	1967 Amsterdam	Team pursuit

Cipriano Chemello (19 July 1945 – 14 February 2017) was an Italian cyclist.

== Biography ==
Chemello won the Olympic bronze medal at the 1968 Summer Olympics in team pursuit with Lorenzo Bosisio, Giorgio Morbiato, and Luigi Roncaglia.

== See also ==
- Italian medals in cycling at the Olympic Games
