= Giovanni Bramucci =

Italian cyclist (1946–2019)

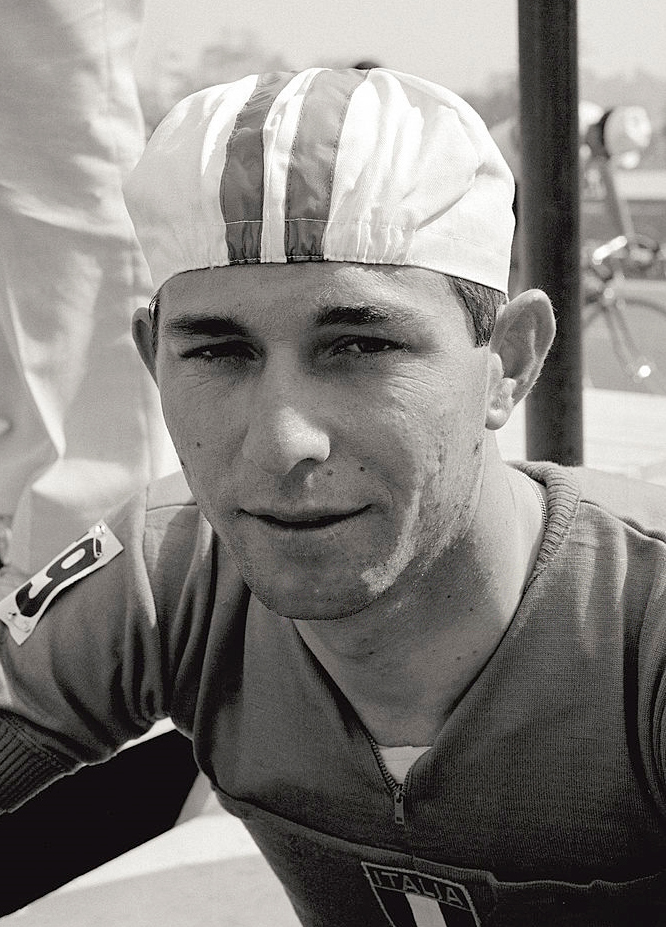
- Giovanni Bramucci at the 1968 Olympics

Personal information
- Born: 15 November 1946 Civitavecchia, Italy
- Died: 26 September 2019 (aged 72) Civitavecchia, Italy
- Height: 1.78 m (5 ft 10 in)
- Weight: 70 kg (150 lb)

Cycling career
- Sport: Cycling
Medal record
Representing Italy
Summer Olympics
Bronze medal – third place	1968 Mexico City	Team time trial
Road Cycling World Championships
Bronze medal – third place	1968 Imola	Team time trial

Giovanni Bramucci (15 November 1946 – 26 September 2019) was an Italian road cyclist. In 1968 he won bronze medals in the team time trial at the 1968 Summer Olympics in Mexico City and UCI Road World Championships. Individually he finished eighth at the Olympics and tenth at the world championships. After that he turned professional, but had little success and retired in 1971.
