= Enzo Barlocco =

Italian water polo player

Personal information
- Nationality: Italian
- Born: 16 February 1944 (age 81); Nervi, Italy

Sport
- Sport: Water polo

Enzo Barlocco (born 16 February 1944) is an Italian water polo player. He competed in the men's tournament at the 1968 Summer Olympics.
