= Gert Bongers =

Dutch cyclist

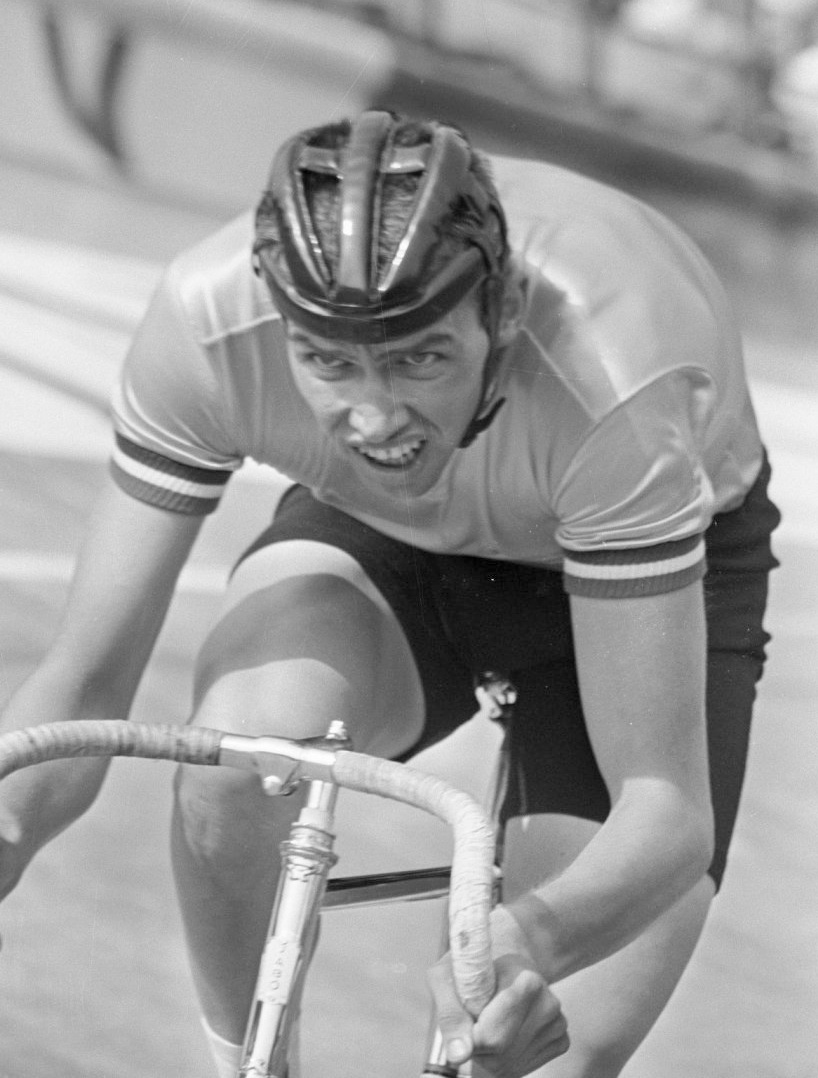
- Gert Bongers in 1967

Personal information
- Born: 22 August 1946 (age 79) Voorst, the Netherlands

Sport
- Sport: Cycling
Medal record
Representing the Netherlands
World Championships
| Gold medal – first place | 1967 Amsterdam | Individual pursuit |

Gert Bongers (born 22 August 1946) is a retired cyclist from the Netherlands. He won the individual pursuit event at the 1967 World championships in 1967 in the Amateurs category. Next year he turned professional and finished second in the individual pursuit in the national championships; he won the national title in this event 1969.

He retired soon and later regretted becoming a professional and thus missing the Olympics. He became a successful businessman and was living in Curaçao.
