= Daniel Rébillard =

French cyclist

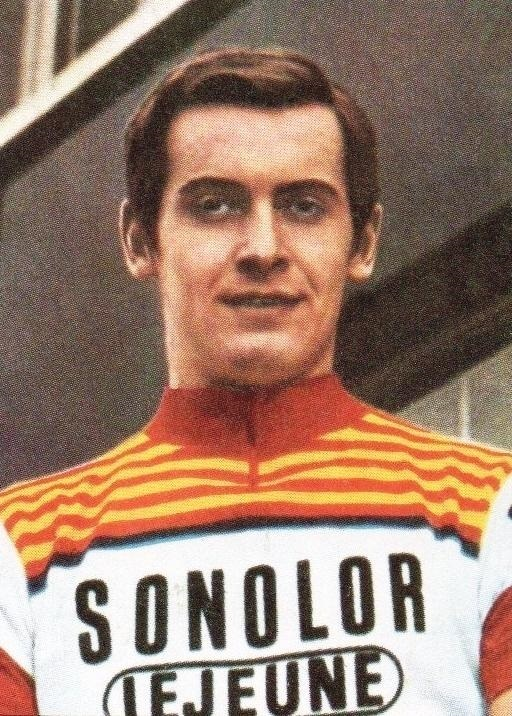
- Daniel Rebillard in 1968

Personal information
- Born: 20 December 1948 (age 77) Tournan-en-Brie
- Height: 1.84 m (6 ft 0 in)
- Weight: 72 kg (159 lb)

Sport
- Sport: Track cycling
- Club: VC Poudrette Maison-Neuve, Lyon
Medal record
Representing France
Olympic Games
Gold medal – first place	1968 Mexico City	Individual pursuit
World Championships
Bronze medal – third place	1969 Antwerpen	Individual pursuit
Bronze medal – third place	1969 Antwerpen	Team pursuit

Daniel Denis Étienne Rébillard (born 20 December 1948) is a retired French cyclist who won a gold medal in the 4000 m individual pursuit at the 1968 Summer Olympics; he finished fifth in the team pursuit event. In 1969 he won individual and team bronze medals in the same events at the amateur world championships. The same year he turned professional, and in 1973 won the national title in the individual pursuit. He rode the 1974 Tour de France, and finished 77th overall.

== Major results ==
1968
1st Individual pursuit, Olympic Games
