= Viktor Bykov =

Soviet cyclist

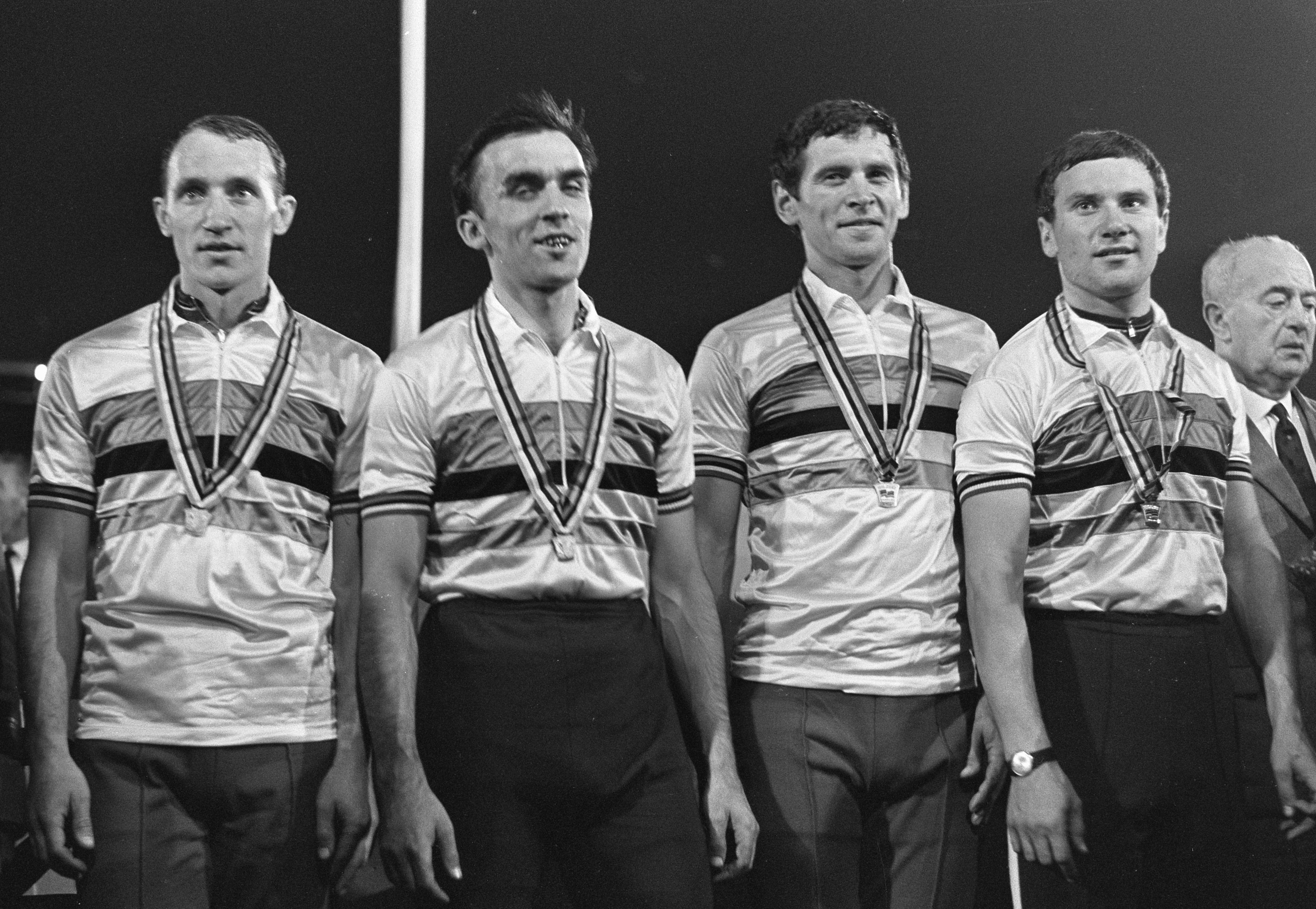
- Stanislav Moskvin, Mikhail Kolyushev, Dzintars Latsis and Viktor Bykov at the 1967 World Championships

Personal information
- Born: 19 February 1945 (age 81) Simferopol, Russian SFSR, Soviet Union
- Height: 1.78 m (5 ft 10 in)
- Weight: 74 kg (163 lb)

Sport
- Sport: Cycling
- Club: Dynamo Minsk
Medal record
Representing the Soviet Union
World Track Championships
Bronze medal – third place	1966 Frankfurt	Team pursuit
Gold medal – first place	1967 Amsterdam	Team pursuit
Gold medal – first place	1969 Antwerpen	Team pursuit
Bronze medal – third place	1970 Leicester	Team pursuit
Bronze medal – third place	1970 Leicester	Individual pursuit

Viktor Nikolayevich Bykov (Russian: Виктор Николаевич Быков; born 19 February 1945) is a retired Soviet cyclist from Ukraine. He competed at the 1968 and 1972 Summer Olympics in the 4 km team pursuit and finished in fourth and fifth place, respectively. He was part of the Soviet teams that won the team pursuit at the 1967 and 1969 UCI Track Cycling World Championships. Between 1965 and 1971 he won six national titles in the 4 km individual and team pursuit.
