= Per Lyngemark =

Danish cyclist (1941–2010)

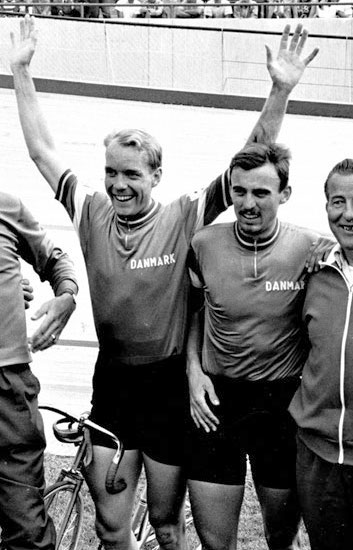
- Lyngemark (left) at the 1968 Olympics

Personal information
- Born: 23 May 1941 Frederiksberg, Denmark
- Died: 2 April 2010 (aged 68)
- Height: 178 cm (5 ft 10 in)
- Weight: 68 kg (150 lb)

Cycling career
- Sport: Cycling
- Discipline: Track cycling

Amateur team
- 1964–1972: DBC, Gentofte
Medal record
Representing DEN
Olympic Games
Gold medal – first place	1968 Mexico City	Team pursuit

Per Pedersen Lyngemark, also known as Per Jørgensen, (23 May 1941 – 2 April 2010) was a Danish amateur track cyclist. Competing in the 4000 m team pursuit he won a gold medal at the 1968 Olympics and the national title in 1968 and 1972.
