= Luigi Roncaglia =

Italian cyclist (born 1943)

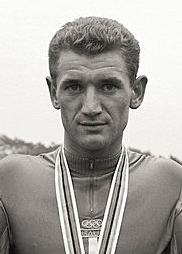
- Roncaglia at the 1964 Olympics

Personal information
- Born: 10 June 1943 (age 83) Roverbella, Italy
- Height: 1.78 m (5 ft 10 in)
- Weight: 77 kg (170 lb)

Cycling career
- Sport: Cycling
Medal record
Representing Italy
Men's track cycling
Olympic Games
Silver medal – second place	1964 Tokyo	Team pursuit
Bronze medal – third place	1968 Mexico City	Team pursuit
World championships
Silver medal – second place	1965 San Sebastian	Team pursuit
Gold medal – first place	1966 Frankfurt	Team pursuit
Silver medal – second place	1967 Amsterdam	Team pursuit
Gold medal – first place	1968 Rome	Team pursuit

Luigi Roncaglia (born 10 June 1943) is a retired Italian cyclist. He competed as an amateur track racer in the team pursuit at the 1964 and 1968 Olympics and at the world championships of 1965–1968, winning a medal on all occasions. He then became a professional road cyclist and won a six-day race in Melbourne in 1970.
