= Giorgio Morbiato =

Italian cyclist (born 1948)

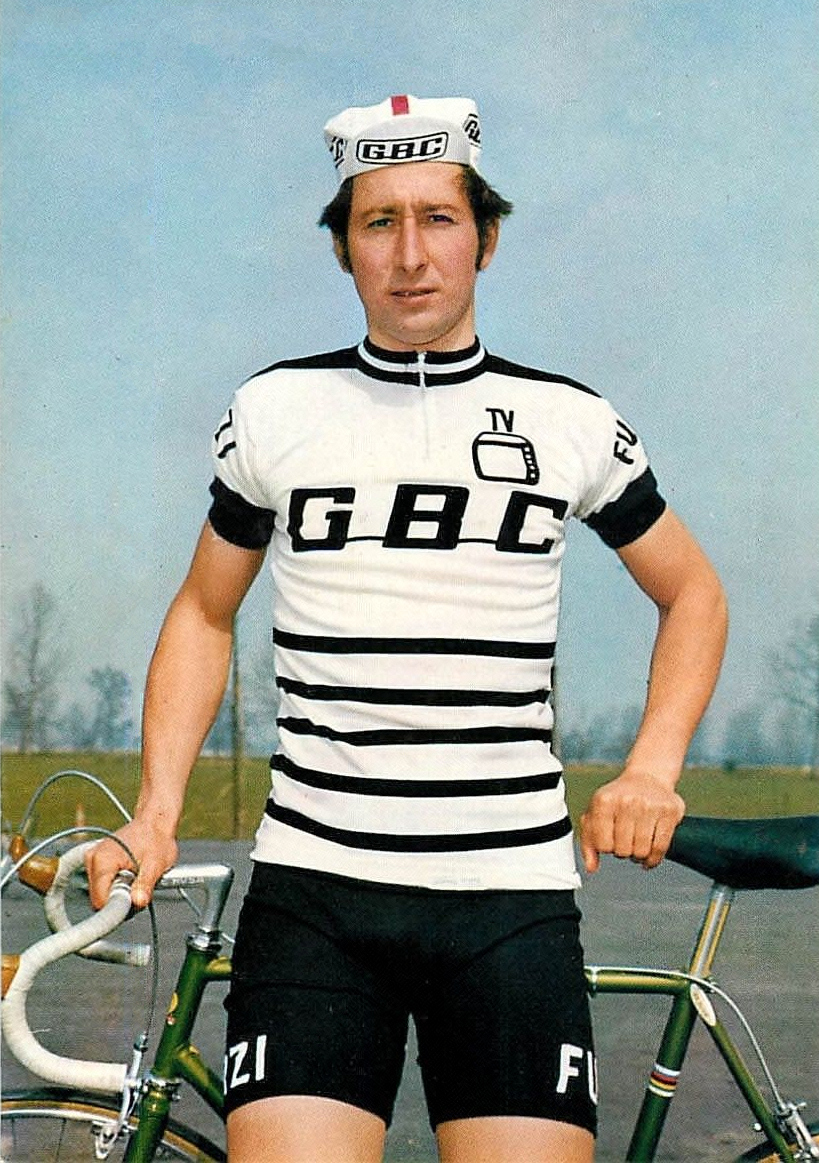

Personal information
- Born: 30 July 1948 Padua, Italy
- Height: 1.82 m (5 ft 11 1/2 in)
- Weight: 76 kg (168 lb)

Cycling career
- Sport: Cycling
Medal record
Representing Italy
Summer Olympics
| Bronze medal – third place | 1968 Mexico City | Team pursuit |
UCI Track Cycling World Championships
| Gold medal – first place | 1968 Rome | Team pursuit |
| Silver medal – second place | 1969 Antwerp | Team pursuit |
| Gold medal – first place | 1971 Varese | Team pursuit |

Giorgio Morbiato (born 30 July 1948) is a retired Italian cyclist who won a bronze medal in the 4000 m team pursuit at the 1968 Olympics and placed ninth in 1972. He also won a world title in this event in 1968 and 1971 and finished second in 1969. After the 1972 Olympics he turned professional and won road races in Cecina and Delhi before retiring in 1974–75.
