= Gunnar Asmussen =

Danish cyclist (born 1944)

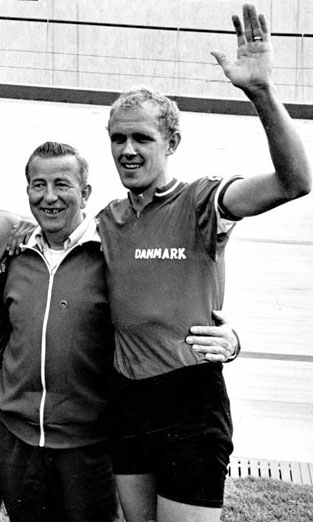
- Asmussen with coach at the 1968 Olympics

Personal information
- Born: 10 May 1944 (age 82) Aarhus, Denmark
- Height: 184 cm (6 ft 0 in)
- Weight: 72 kg (159 lb)

Cycling career
- Sport: Cycling
- Disciplines: Track, road

Amateur team
- 1964–1976: Aarhus Bane – Klub, Århus
Medal record
Representing DEN
Olympic Games
Gold medal – first place	1968 Mexico City	Team pursuit

Gunnar Henry Asmussen (born 10 May 1944) is a Danish retired amateur cyclist. He won a gold medal in the track team pursuit at the 1968 Summer Olympics and placed 13th in 1972. Asmussen held national titles both in the road race (1964–65, 1971) and track team pursuit (1969–71, 1974 and 1976).
