= Vladimir Kuznetsov (cyclist) =

Soviet cyclist (1945–2026)

Personal information
- Born: 13 May 1945 Moscow, Russian SFSR, USSR
- Died: 19 July 2026 (aged 81) Moscow, Russia

Cycling career
- Sport: Cycling

Vladimir Mikhaylovich Kuznetsov (Russian: Владимир Михайлович Кузнецов; 13 May 1945 – 19 July 2026) was a Soviet cyclist. He competed at the 1968 Summer Olympics and the 1972 Summer Olympics.

== Biography ==
Vladimir Mikhaylovich Kuznetsov was born in Moscow on 13 May 1945. He began to actively engage in cycling in early childhood, trained in the capital's voluntary sports society Dynamo. He achieved his first major success on the track in 1968, when he became the USSR champion in the team pursuit and won a silver medal in the individual.

In 1969 he was a member of the gold medal team at the World Championships in team pursuit and in 1970 he was a bronze medalist in the same event at the championships. He became a coach after the end of his competitive career.

Kuznetsov died in July 2026, aged 81.
