= Karl-Heinz Henrichs =

German cyclist

Personal information
- Full name: Karl-Heinz Henrichs
- Born: 1 July 1942 Schermbeck, Nazi Germany
- Died: 3 April 2008 (aged 65) Bocholt, Germany

Cycling career
- Sport: Cycling
- Discipline: Track
- Role: Rider
- Rider type: Sprinter
Medal record
Men's track cycling
Olympic Games
Representing Germany
Gold medal – first place	1964 Tokyo	Team pursuit
Representing West Germany
Silver medal – second place	1968 Mexico City	Team pursuit

Karl-Heinz Henrichs (1 July 1942 – 3 April 2008) was a German racing cyclist. Together with his teammates he won the gold medal in the team pursuit at the 1964 Summer Olympics in Tokyo and the silver medal at the 1968 Summer Olympics in Mexico City.
