= Reno Olsen =

Danish cyclist (born 1947)

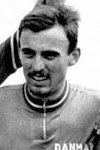
- Olsen at the 1968 Olympics

Personal information
- Born: 19 February 1947 (age 79) Roskilde, Denmark
- Height: 173 cm (5 ft 8 in)
- Weight: 70 kg (154 lb)

Cycling career
- Sport: Cycling

Amateur team
- 1966–1973: DBC Copenhagen, Roskilde Cykle Ring
Medal record
Representing DEN
Olympic Games
Gold medal – first place	1968 Mexico City	Team pursuit

Reno Bent Olsen (born 19 February 1947) is a Danish retired cyclist. Competing in the track team pursuit he won a gold medal at the 1968 Summer Olympics and the national title in 1966–68 and 1971–73. As a road racer he held the individual Danish title in 1972 and 1973 and competed professionally in 1974–75 and 1981–84, but without much success.
