= Lorenzo Bosisio =

Italian cyclist (born 1944)

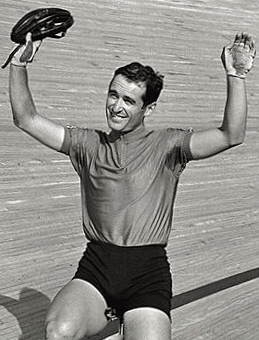
- Lorenzo Bosisio at the 1968 Olympics

Personal information
- Born: 24 September 1944 Marmirolo, Italy
- Height: 1.76 m (5 ft 9 1/2 in)
- Weight: 75 kg (165 lb)

Cycling career
- Sport: Cycling
Medal record
Representing Italy
Summer Olympics
Bronze medal – third place	1968 Mexico City	Team pursuit
World championships (track)
Gold medal – first place	1968 Rome	Team pursuit
Bronze medal – third place	1968 Rome	Individual pursuit
Silver medal – second place	1970 Leicester	Individual pursuit
World championships (road)
Bronze medal – third place	1967 Heerlen	Team time trial

Lorenzo Bosisio (born 24 September 1944) is a retired Italian road and track cyclist. On the road he won a team bronze medal at the 1967 World Championships. Next year he had his best achievements on track, winning an Olympic bronze medal and a world title in the team pursuit, as well as a bronze medal in the individual pursuit at the world championships.

In 1969 Bosisio turned professional and won a silver medal in the individual pursuit at the 1970 World Championships. He had little success on the road, and retired in 1971.
