= Mikhail Kolyushev =

Tajikistani cyclist (1943–2024)

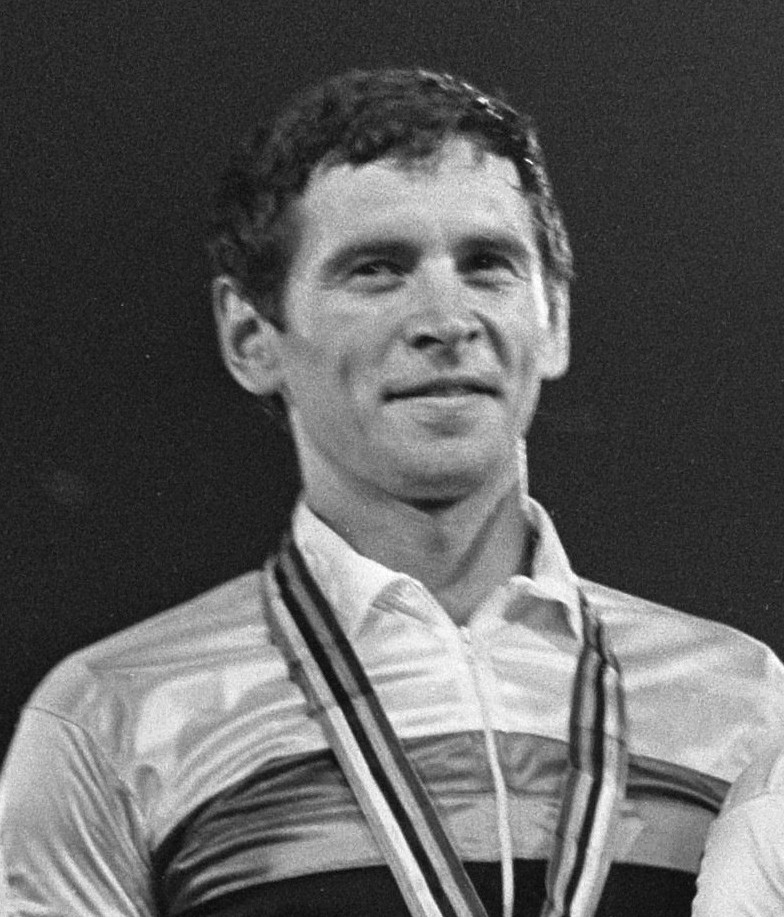
- Kolyushev at the 1967 World Championships

Personal information
- Born: 28 April 1943 Stalinabad, Tajik SSR, USSR
- Died: 9 June 2024 (aged 81)
- Height: 1.84 m (6 ft 0 in)
- Weight: 82 kg (181 lb)

Sport
- Sport: Cycling
- Club: Dynamo Toshkent
Medal record
Representing the Soviet Union
World Track Championships
Gold medal – first place	1965 San Sebastián	Team pursuit
Bronze medal – third place	1966 Frankfurt	Team pursuit
Gold medal – first place	1967 Amsterdam	Team pursuit

Mikhail Ivanovich Kolyushev (Russian: Михаил Иванович Колюшев; 28 April 1943 – 9 June 2024) was a Soviet cyclist from Tajikistan. He trained in the Dushanbe Dynamo voluntary sports society, and later in Tashkent. He competed at the 1968 Summer Olympics in the 4 km team pursuit and finished in fourth place. He was part of the Soviet teams that won the team pursuit at the 1965 and 1967 UCI Track Cycling World Championships. Between 1965 and 1968 Kolyushev won six national titles in various track events and set a world record in the 1 km track time trial (1:01.32, 1967). Kolyushev died on 9 June 2024, at the age of 81.
