= Stanislav Moskvin =

Russian cyclist and coach (1939–2025)

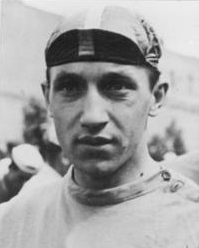
- Moskvin in 1961

Personal information
- Born: 19 January 1939 Oranienbaum, Leningrad Oblast, Russian SFSR, Soviet Union
- Died: 18 December 2025 (aged 86)
- Height: 1.81 m (5 ft 11 in)
- Weight: 80 kg (180 lb)

Sport
- Sport: Cycling
- Club: Burevestnik Leningrad
Medal record
Representing the Soviet Union
Olympic Games
Bronze medal – third place	1960 Rome	Team pursuit
World Championships
Gold medal – first place	1963 Rocourt	Team pursuit
Gold medal – first place	1965 San Sebastian	Team pursuit
Gold medal – first place	1967 Amsterdam	Team pursuit
Gold medal – first place	1969 Antwerp	Team pursuit
Silver medal – second place	1963 Rocourt	Individual pursuit
Silver medal – second place	1965 San Sebastian	Individual pursuit
Bronze medal – third place	1962 Milan	Team pursuit
Bronze medal – third place	1964 Paris	Team pursuit
Bronze medal – third place	1970 Leicester	Team pursuit

Stanislav Vasilyevich Moskvin (Russian: Станислав Васильевич Москвин; 19 January 1939 – 18 December 2025) was a Russian cyclist and cycling coach. He competed at the 1960, 1964 and 1968 Olympics in the 4000 m individual and team pursuit. In 1960, he won a bronze medal in the team competition; in 1964 he finished in fifth place, both individually and with a team, and in 1968 his team finished fourth.

Between 1962 and 1970, he won four world titles with the Soviet team and five silver and bronze medals in the individual and team pursuit. He also won 18 national titles (1958–1969), as well as the Peace Race in 1961 and 1962 in the team competition.

After retirement he coached the national teams of the Soviet Union (1971–1973), Algeria (1974–1980) and Colombia (1995–1999). Between 1980 and 1983, he headed the cycling federation of Saint Petersburg and between 1984 and 1988 the club Burevestnik, for which he competed before. For his achievements, he was awarded the Medal "For Distinguished Labour" and Medal "For Labour Valour".

Moskvin died on 18 December 2025, at the age of 86.
