= Cycling at the 1968 Summer Olympics – Men's sprint =

Cycling at the Olympics

Men's sprint at the Games of the XIX Olympiad
- Venue: Olympic Velodrome, Mexico City
- Dates: 18–19 October 1968
- Competitors: 47 from 28 nations

Medalists
1st place, gold medalist(s)		Daniel Morelon; France
2nd place, silver medalist(s)		Giordano Turrini; Italy
3rd place, bronze medalist(s)		Pierre Trentin; France

The men's sprint was a cycling event held at the 1968 Summer Olympics in Mexico City, Mexico, from 18 to 19 October 1968. There were 47 participants from 28 nations. Each nation was limited to two cyclists. The event was won by Daniel Morelon of France, his second consecutive medal and first gold; it was also France's world-leading sixth victory in the men's sprint. This year, his countryman Pierre Trentin, who had lost the bronze medal match to Morelon four years earlier, won it against Omar Pkhakadze of the Soviet Union. Among the French cyclists was silver medalist Giordano Turrini of Italy, extending that nation's streak of top-two results in the event to six Games.

== Background ==
This was the 14th appearance of the event, which has been held at every Summer Olympics except 1904 and 1912. The only two quarterfinalists from 1964 to return were the French cyclists: Pierre Trentin and Daniel Morelon. Trentin had been favored in 1964, but both had lost in the semifinals, and Morelon had won the bronze medal between them. Morelon would beat Trentin again at the 1966 and 1967 World Championship finals and the 1968 Grand Prix de Paris, though Trentin would prevail in the 1964, 1965, and 1967 Grand Prix competitions. Coming into Mexico City, Morelon was favored, with Trentin expected to challenge him in the final. Also contending were 1965 World Champion Omar Phakadze of the Soviet Union, runner-up Giordano Turrini of Italy, and 1968 runner-up Niels Fredborg of Denmark.

Barbados, Belize, Lebanon, the Philippines, Puerto Rico, South Korea, and Thailand each debuted in the men's sprint; West Germany competed separately for the first time. France made its 14th appearance, the only nation to have competed at every event appearance.

== Competition format ==
This sprint competition involved a series of head-to-head matches. The 1968 competition involved ten rounds: six main rounds (first round, second round, 1/8 finals, quarterfinals, semifinals, and finals) and three repechages after the first three main rounds; the third repechage was a two-round repechage.

- First round: The 51 entrants were divided into 17 heats of 3 cyclists each. Withdrawals left some heats with only 2 competitors. The winner of each heat advanced directly to the second round (17 cyclists), while all other cyclists who competed were sent to the first repechage (30 cyclists).
- First repechage: The 30 cyclists were divided into 12 heats, each with 2 or 3 cyclists. The winner of each heat advanced to the second round (12 cyclists), while all others were eliminated (18 cyclists, including those who did not start).
- Second round: The 29 cyclists who advanced through the first round or first repechage were divided into 10 heats; all heats had 3 cyclists except heat 1, which had only 2. The winner of each heat advanced directly to the third round, the 1/8 finals (10 cyclists), while all others went to the second repechage (19 cyclists).
- Second repechage: The 19 cyclists from the second round were divided into 8 heats, with 2 or 3 cyclists per heat. Winners advanced to the 1/8 finals (8 cyclists), while all others were eliminated (11 cyclists, including those who did not start).
- 1/8 finals: The 18 cyclists who advanced through the first two rounds (including repechages) competed in a 1/8 finals round. There were 6 heats in this round, with 3 cyclists in each. The top cyclist in each heat advanced to the quarterfinals (6 cyclists), while the other 2 in each heat went to the third repechage (12 cyclists).
- Third repechage: This was a two-round repechage. The repechage began with 4 heats of 3 cyclists each. The top cyclist in each heat advanced to the second round, while the other 2 cyclists in each heat were eliminated. The second round of this repechage featured 2 heats of 2 cyclists each, with the winners advancing to the quarterfinals and the losers eliminated.
- Quarterfinals: Beginning with the quarterfinals, all matches were one-on-one competitions held in a best-of-three format. There were 4 quarterfinals, with the winner of each advancing to the semifinals and the loser eliminated.
- Semifinals: The two semifinals provided advancement to the gold medal final for winners and the bronze medal final for losers.
- Finals: Both a gold medal final and a bronze medal final were held.

== Records ==
The sprint records are 200 metre flying time trial records, kept for the qualifying round in later Games as well as for the finish of races.

World record	Omar Pkhakadze (URS)	10.61	Mexico City, Mexico	22 October 1967
Olympic record	Valentino Gasparella (ITA)	11.1	Rome, Italy	29 August 1960

Jan Jansen matched the Olympic record at 11.10 seconds for the last 200 metres in the eighth heat of round 1. Dino Verzini set a new record of 10.87 seconds in the next heat. Roger Gibbon pushed the record to 10.70 seconds in the fifth heat of round 2. Leijn Loevesijn's time of 10.66 seconds in the second heat of the third repechage semifinals was the last record-breaking performance of the event.

== Schedule ==
All times are Central Standard Time (UTC-6)

Date	Time	Round
Friday, 18 October 1968	10:00	Round 1 First repechage Round 2 Second repechage 1/8 finals Third repechage semifinals Third repechage finals
Saturday, 19 October 1968	10:00	Quarterfinals; Semifinals; Finals

== Results ==
=== First round ===
==== First round heat 1 ====
Rank	Cyclist	Nation	Time	Notes
1	Daniel Morelon	France	11.24	Q
2	Juan Reyes	Cuba	–	R
3	Roberto Roxas	Philippines	–	R

==== First round heat 2 ====
Rank	Cyclist	Nation	Time	Notes
1	Pierre Trentin	France	11.61	Q
2	José Jaime Galeano	Colombia	–	R
3	Pakanit Boriharnvanakhet	Thailand	–	R

==== First round heat 3 ====
Rank	Cyclist	Nation	Time	Notes
1	Giordano Turrini	Italy	11.34	Q
2	Sanji Inoue	Japan	–	R
3	Kensley Reece	Barbados	–	R

==== First round heat 4 ====
Rank	Cyclist	Nation	Time	Notes
1	Omar Pkhakadze	Soviet Union	11.30	Q
2	José Pittaro	Argentina	–	R
3	Tarek Abou Al Dahab	Lebanon	–	R

==== First round heat 5 ====
Jürgen Kissner of West Germany was entered in this heat but did not compete.

Rank	Cyclist	Nation	Time	Notes
1	Roger Gibbon	Trinidad and Tobago	11.15	Q
2	Fan Yue-tao	Taiwan	–	R

==== First round heat 6 ====
Rank	Cyclist	Nation	Time	Notes
1	Robert Van Lancker	Belgium	11.37	Q
2	Héctor Urrego	Colombia	–	R
3	Kim Gwang-seon	South Korea	–	R

==== First round heat 7 ====
George Artin of Iraq was entered in this heat but did not compete.

Rank	Cyclist	Nation	Time	Notes
1	Reg Barnett	Great Britain	11.34	Q
2	Bob Boucher	Canada	–	R

==== First round heat 8 ====
Constantin Kabemba of the Cook Islands was entered in this heat but did not compete.

Rank	Cyclist	Nation	Time	Notes
1	Jan Jansen	Netherlands	11.10	Q, =OR
2	Arturo García	Mexico	–	R

==== First round heat 9 ====
Rank	Cyclist	Nation	Time	Notes
1	Dino Verzini	Italy	10.87	Q, OR
2	Leslie King	Trinidad and Tobago	–	R
3	Rolando Guaves	Philippines	–	R

==== First round heat 10 ====
Rank	Cyclist	Nation	Time	Notes
1	Niels Fredborg	Denmark	10.91	Q
2	Jocelyn Lovell	Canada	–	R
3	Kriengsak Varavudhi	Thailand	–	R

==== First round heat 11 ====
Rank	Cyclist	Nation	Time	Notes
1	Leijn Loevesijn	Netherlands	10.92	Q
2	András Baranyecz	Hungary	–	R
3	Tim Mountford	United States	–	R

==== First round heat 12 ====
Rank	Cyclist	Nation	Time	Notes
1	Gordon Johnson	Australia	11.42	Q
2	José Mercado	Mexico	–	R
3	Gwon Jung-hyeon	South Korea	–	R

==== First round heat 13 ====
Ignace Mandjambi of Coogo-Kinshasa was entered in this heat but did not compete.

Rank	Cyclist	Nation	Time	Notes
1	Jürgen Barth	West Germany	11.39	Q
2	Carlos Roqueiro	Argentina	–	R

==== First round heat 14 ====
Rank	Cyclist	Nation	Time	Notes
1	Ivan Kučírek	Czechoslovakia	11.03	Q
2	Ian Alsop	Great Britain	–	R
3	Aubrey Bryce	Guyana	–	R

==== First round heat 15 ====
Rank	Cyclist	Nation	Time	Notes
1	Jackie Simes	United States	11.23	Q
2	Daniel Goens	Belgium	–	R
3	Kenneth Sutherland	British Honduras	–	R

==== First round heat 16 ====
Rank	Cyclist	Nation	Time	Notes
1	Peder Pedersen	Denmark	11.08	Q
2	Sergey Kravtsov	Soviet Union	–	R
3	Edwin Torres	Puerto Rico	–	R

==== First round heat 17 ====
Rank	Cyclist	Nation	Time	Notes
1	Miloš Jelínek	Czechoslovakia	11.40	Q
2	John Nicholson	Australia	–	R
3	Raúl Marcelo Vázquez	Cuba	–	R

=== First repechage ===
Tarek Abou Al Dahab of Lebanon withdrew.

==== First repechage heat 1 ====
Rank	Cyclist	Nation	Time	Notes
1	Sanji Inoue	Japan	11.60	Q
2	Pakanit Boriharnvanakhet	Thailand	–	
3	Héctor Urrego	Colombia	–	

==== First repechage heat 2 ====
Rank	Cyclist	Nation	Time	Notes
1	José Pittaro	Argentina	11.41	Q
2	Roberto Roxas	Philippines	–	
3	Aubrey Bryce	Guyana	–	

==== First repechage heat 3 ====
Rank	Cyclist	Nation	Time	Notes
1	Tim Mountford	United States	11.03	Q
2	Kim Gwang-seon	South Korea	–	
3	José Jaime Galeano	Colombia	–	

==== First repechage heat 4 ====
Rank	Cyclist	Nation	Time	Notes
1	Leslie King	Trinidad and Tobago	11.35	Q
2	Juan Reyes	Cuba	–	
3	Gwon Jung-hyeon	South Korea	–	

==== First repechage heat 5 ====
Rank	Cyclist	Nation	Time	Notes
1	Jocelyn Lovell	Canada	11.30	Q
2	Arturo García	Mexico	–	
3	Rolando Guaves	Philippines	–	

==== First repechage heat 6 ====
Rank	Cyclist	Nation	Time	Notes
1	András Baranyecz	Hungary	11.08	Q
2	Kriengsak Varavudhi	Thailand	–	

==== First repechage heat 7 ====
Rank	Cyclist	Nation	Time	Notes
1	José Mercado	Mexico	11.27	Q
2	Kensley Reece	Barbados	–	

==== First repechage heat 8 ====
Rank	Cyclist	Nation	Time	Notes
1	Carlos Roqueiro	Argentina	11.15	Q
2	Edwin Torres	Puerto Rico	–	

==== First repechage heat 9 ====
Rank	Cyclist	Nation	Time	Notes
1	Ian Alsop	Great Britain	11.19	Q
2	Bob Boucher	Canada	–	

==== First repechage heat 10 ====
Rank	Cyclist	Nation	Time	Notes
1	Daniel Goens	Belgium	11.81	Q
2	Fan Yue-tao	Taiwan	–	

==== First repechage heat 11 ====
Rank	Cyclist	Nation	Time	Notes
1	Sergey Kravtsov	Soviet Union	11.56	Q
2	Raúl Marcelo Vázquez	Cuba	–	

==== First repechage heat 12 ====
Rank	Cyclist	Nation	Time	Notes
1	John Nicholson	Australia	11.09	Q
2	Kenneth Sutherland	British Honduras	–	

=== Second round ===
==== Second round heat 1 ====
Rank	Cyclist	Nation	Time	Notes
1	Daniel Morelon	France	10.94	Q
2	Tim Mountford	United States	–	R

==== Second round heat 2 ====
Rank	Cyclist	Nation	Time	Notes
1	Pierre Trentin	France	10.91	Q
2	Sanji Inoue	Japan	–	R
3	Leslie King	Trinidad and Tobago	–	R

==== Second round heat 3 ====
Rank	Cyclist	Nation	Time	Notes
1	Giordano Turrini	Italy	11.47	Q
2	José Pittaro	Argentina	–	R
3	Jocelyn Lovell	Canada	–	R

==== Second round heat 4 ====
Rank	Cyclist	Nation	Time	Notes
1	Omar Pkhakadze	Soviet Union	11.26	Q
2	Miloš Jelínek	Czechoslovakia	–	R
3	Ian Alsop	Great Britain	–	R

==== Second round heat 5 ====
Rank	Cyclist	Nation	Time	Notes
1	Roger Gibbon	Trinidad and Tobago	10.70	Q, OR
2	Peder Pedersen	Denmark	–	R
3	András Baranyecz	Hungary	–	R

==== Second round heat 6 ====
Rank	Cyclist	Nation	Time	Notes
1	Jackie Simes	United States	10.72	Q
2	Robert Van Lancker	Belgium	–	R
3	Sergey Kravtsov	Soviet Union	–	R

==== Second round heat 7 ====
Rank	Cyclist	Nation	Time	Notes
1	Ivan Kučírek	Czechoslovakia	11.38	Q
2	Reg Barnett	Great Britain	–	R
3	José Mercado	Mexico	–	R

==== Second round heat 8 ====
Rank	Cyclist	Nation	Time	Notes
1	Gordon Johnson	Australia	11.06	Q
2	Jan Jansen	Netherlands	–	R
3	Carlos Roqueiro	Argentina	–	R

==== Second round heat 9 ====
Rank	Cyclist	Nation	Time	Notes
1	Jürgen Barth	West Germany	10.95	Q
2	Dino Verzini	Italy	–	R
3	John Nicholson	Australia	–	R

==== Second round heat 10 ====
Rank	Cyclist	Nation	Time	Notes
1	Niels Fredborg	Denmark	11.09	Q
2	Leijn Loevesijn	Netherlands	–	R
3	Daniel Goens	Belgium	–	R

=== Second repechage ===
==== Second repechage heat 1 ====
Rank	Cyclist	Nation	Time	Notes
1	Sergey Kravtsov	Soviet Union	10.87	Q
2	Sanji Inoue	Japan	–	
–	Miloš Jelínek	Czechoslovakia	DNS	

==== Second repechage heat 2 ====
Rank	Cyclist	Nation	Time	Notes
1	Leslie King	Trinidad and Tobago	11.16	Q
2	José Mercado	Mexico	–	
3	Ian Alsop	Great Britain	–	

==== Second repechage heat 3 ====
Rank	Cyclist	Nation	Time	Notes
1	Tim Mountford	United States	11.31	Q
2	Peder Pedersen	Denmark	–	

==== Second repechage heat 4 ====
Rank	Cyclist	Nation	Time	Notes
1	Robert Van Lancker	Belgium	10.99	Q
2	András Baranyecz	Hungary	–	

==== Second repechage heat 5 ====
Rank	Cyclist	Nation	Time	Notes
1	Reg Barnett	Great Britain	11.01	Q
2	John Nicholson	Australia	–	

==== Second repechage heat 6 ====
Rank	Cyclist	Nation	Time	Notes
1	Jan Jansen	Netherlands	11.13	Q
2	Daniel Goens	Belgium	–	
3	José Pittaro	Argentina	–	

==== Second repechage heat 7 ====
Rank	Cyclist	Nation	Time	Notes
1	Dino Verzini	Italy	11.04	Q
2	Carlos Roqueiro	Argentina	–	

==== Second repechage heat 8 ====
Rank	Cyclist	Nation	Time	Notes
1	Leijn Loevesijn	Netherlands	11.91	Q
2	Jocelyn Lovell	Canada	–	

=== 1/8 finals ===
==== 1/8 final 1 ====
Rank	Cyclist	Nation	Time	Notes
1	Daniel Morelon	France	11.00	Q
2	Leslie King	Trinidad and Tobago	–	R
3	Reg Barnett	Great Britain	–	R

==== 1/8 final 2 ====
Rank	Cyclist	Nation	Time	Notes
1	Pierre Trentin	France	10.96	Q
2	Sergey Kravtsov	Soviet Union	–	R
3	Robert Van Lancker	Belgium	–	R

==== 1/8 final 3 ====
Rank	Cyclist	Nation	Time	Notes
1	Giordano Turrini	Italy	10.96	Q
2	Jürgen Barth	West Germany	–	R
3	Leijn Loevesijn	Netherlands	–	R

==== 1/8 final 4 ====
Rank	Cyclist	Nation	Time	Notes
1	Omar Pkhakadze	Soviet Union	10.94	Q
2	Tim Mountford	United States	–	R
3	Niels Fredborg	Denmark	–	R

==== 1/8 final 5 ====
Rank	Cyclist	Nation	Time	Notes
1	Jan Jansen	Netherlands	11.06	Q
2	Roger Gibbon	Trinidad and Tobago	–	R
3	Gordon Johnson	Australia	–	R

==== 1/8 final 6 ====
Rank	Cyclist	Nation	Time	Notes
1	Dino Verzini	Italy	10.81	Q
2	Jackie Simes	United States	–	R
3	Ivan Kučírek	Czechoslovakia	–	R

=== Third repechage heats ===
==== Third repechage heat 1 ====
Rank	Cyclist	Nation	Time	Notes
1	Jürgen Barth	West Germany	10.98	Q
2	Robert Van Lancker	Belgium	–	
3	Reg Barnett	Great Britain	–	

==== Third repechage heat 2 ====
Rank	Cyclist	Nation	Time	Notes
1	Leijn Loevesijn	Netherlands	10.66	Q, OR
2	Roger Gibbon	Trinidad and Tobago	–	
3	Sergey Kravtsov	Soviet Union	–	

==== Third repechage heat 3 ====
Rank	Cyclist	Nation	Time	Notes
1	Jackie Simes	United States	10.92	Q
2	Niels Fredborg	Denmark	–	
3	Leslie King	Trinidad and Tobago	–	

==== Third repechage heat 4 ====
Rank	Cyclist	Nation	Time	Notes
1	Tim Mountford	United States	10.79	Q
2	Gordon Johnson	Australia	–	
3	Ivan Kučírek	Czechoslovakia	–	

=== Third repechage finals ===
==== Third repechage final 1 ====
Rank	Cyclist	Nation	Time	Notes
1	Jürgen Barth	West Germany	11.30	Q
2	Jackie Simes	United States	–	

==== Third repechage final 2 ====
Rank	Cyclist	Nation	Time	Notes
1	Leijn Loevesijn	Netherlands	11.09	Q
2	Tim Mountford	United States	–	

=== Quarterfinals ===
==== Quarterfinal 1 ====
Rank	Cyclist	Nation	Race 1		Race 2		Race 3		Notes
Rank	Cyclist	Nation	Rank	Time	Rank	Time	Rank	Time	Notes
1	Daniel Morelon	France	1	11.09	1	11.26	—		Q
2	Leijn Loevesijn	Netherlands	2	–	2	–	—		

==== Quarterfinal 2 ====
Rank	Cyclist	Nation	Race 1		Race 2		Race 3		Notes
Rank	Cyclist	Nation	Rank	Time	Rank	Time	Rank	Time	Notes
1	Pierre Trentin	France	1	11.49	1	12.09	—		Q
2	Jürgen Barth	West Germany	2	–	2	–	—		

==== Quarterfinal 3 ====
Rank	Cyclist	Nation	Race 1		Race 2		Race 3		Notes
Rank	Cyclist	Nation	Rank	Time	Rank	Time	Rank	Time	Notes
1	Giordano Turrini	Italy	2	–	1	10.97	1	11.12	Q
2	Jan Jansen	Netherlands	1	10.85	2	–	2	–	

==== Quarterfinal 4 ====
Rank	Cyclist	Nation	Race 1		Race 2		Race 3		Notes
Rank	Cyclist	Nation	Rank	Time	Rank	Time	Rank	Time	Notes
1	Omar Pkhakadze	Soviet Union	2	–	1	11.35	1	10.86	Q
2	Dino Verzini	Italy	1	11.14	2	–	2	–	

=== Semifinals ===
==== Semifinal 1 ====
Rank	Cyclist	Nation	Race 1		Race 2		Race 3		Notes
Rank	Cyclist	Nation	Rank	Time	Rank	Time	Rank	Time	Notes
1	Daniel Morelon	France	2	–	1	10.76	1	10.69	Q
2	Omar Pkhakadze	Soviet Union	1	10.69	2	–	2	–	B

==== Semifinal 2 ====
Rank	Cyclist	Nation	Race 1		Race 2		Race 3		Notes
Rank	Cyclist	Nation	Rank	Time	Rank	Time	Rank	Time	Notes
1	Giordano Turrini	Italy	1	11.76	1	11.24	—		Q
2	Pierre Trentin	France	2	–	2	–	—		B

=== Finals ===
==== Bronze medal match ====
Rank	Cyclist	Nation	Race 1		Race 2		Race 3	
Rank	Cyclist	Nation	Rank	Time	Rank	Time	Rank	Time
3rd place, bronze medalist(s)	Pierre Trentin	France	1	11.57	2	–	1	10.92
4	Omar Pkhakadze	Soviet Union	2	–	1	11.53	2	–

==== Final ====
Rank	Cyclist	Nation	Race 1		Race 2		Race 3	
Rank	Cyclist	Nation	Rank	Time	Rank	Time	Rank	Time
1st place, gold medalist(s)	Daniel Morelon	France	1	11.27	1	10.68	—	
2nd place, silver medalist(s)	Giordano Turrini	Italy	2	–	2	–	—	

== Final classification ==
Rank	Cyclist	Nation
1st place, gold medalist(s)	Daniel Morelon	France
2nd place, silver medalist(s)	Giordano Turrini	Italy
3rd place, bronze medalist(s)	Pierre Trentin	France
4	Omar Pkhakadze	Soviet Union
5	Jürgen Barth	West Germany
5	Jan Jansen	Netherlands
5	Leijn Loevesijn	Netherlands
5	Dino Verzini	Italy
9	Jackie Simes	United States
9	Tim Mountford	United States
9	Robert Van Lancker	Belgium
9	Roger Gibbon	Trinidad and Tobago
9	Niels Fredborg	Denmark
9	Gordon Johnson	Australia
9	Reg Barnett	Great Britain
9	Serhiy Kravtsov	Soviet Union
9	Leslie King	Trinidad and Tobago
9	Ivan Kučírek	Czechoslovakia
9	Sanji Inoue	Japan
9	José Mercado	Mexico
9	Peder Pedersen	Denmark
9	András Baranyecz	Hungary
9	John Nicholson	Australia
9	Daniel Goens	Belgium
9	Carlos Roqueiro	Argentina
9	Jocelyn Lovell	Canada
9	Ian Alsop	Great Britain
9	José Pittaro	Argentina
9	Miloš Jelínek	Czechoslovakia
9	Pakanit Boriharnvanakhet	Thailand
9	Roberto Roxas	Philippines
9	Kim Gwang-seon	South Korea
9	Juan Reyes	Cuba
9	Arturo García	Mexico
9	Kriengsak Varavudhi	Thailand
9	Kensley Reece	Barbados
9	Edwin Torres	Puerto Rico
9	Bob Boucher	Canada
9	Fan Yue-tao	Taiwan
9	Raúl Marcelo Vázquez	Cuba
9	Kenneth Sutherland	British Honduras
9	Héctor Urrego	Colombia
9	Aubrey Bryce	Guyana
9	José Jaime Galeano	Colombia
9	Gwon Jung-hyeon	South Korea
9	Rolando Guaves	Philippines
9	Tarek Abou Al Dahab	Lebanon
