= Cuba at the 1968 Summer Olympics =

- IOC code: CUB
- NOC: Cuban Olympic Committee

in Mexico City
- Competitors: 115 (101 men and 14 women) in 13 sports
- Flag bearer: Héctor Ramírez
- Medals Ranked 31st: Gold 0 Silver 4 Bronze 0 Total 4

Summer Olympics appearances (overview)
- 1900; 1904; 1908–1920; 1924; 1928; 1932–1936; 1948; 1952; 1956; 1960; 1964; 1968; 1972; 1976; 1980; 1984–1988; 1992; 1996; 2000; 2004; 2008; 2012; 2016; 2020; 2024; 2028

Cuba competed at the 1968 Summer Olympics in Mexico City, Mexico. 115 competitors, 101 men and 14 women, took part in 78 events in 13 sports.

== Medalists ==
=== Silver ===
- Enrique Regüeiferos — Boxing, Men's Light Welterweight
- Rolando Garbey — Boxing, Men's Light Middleweight
- Enrique Figuerola, Pablo Montes, Juan Morales, and Hermes Ramirez — Athletics, Men's 4×100 metre relay
- Miguelina Cobián, Marlene Elejarde, Violetta Quesada, and Fulgencia Romay — Athletics, Women's 4×100 metre relay

== Cycling ==
Six cyclists represented Cuba in 1968.

Individual road race

- Sergio Martínez
- Roberto Menéndez
- Ulises Váldez
- Raúl Marcelo Vázquez

Sprint

- Juan Reyes
- Raúl Marcelo Vázquez

1000m time trial

- Raúl Marcelo Vázquez

Tandem

- Juan Reyes
- Ulises Váldez

Individual pursuit

- Inocente Lizano

Team pursuit

- Sergio Martínez
- Roberto Menéndez
- Raúl Marcelo Vázquez
- Inocente Lizano

== Diving ==
Men

Athlete	Event	Preliminary		Final			
Athlete	Event	Points	Rank	Points	Rank	Total	Rank
Alberto Moreno	3 m springboard	76.80	23	Did not advance			
José Luis Ponce	3 m springboard	72.72	26	Did not advance			
Alberto Moreno	10 m platform	78.28	30	Did not advance			
José Luis Ponce	10 m platform	80.02	29	Did not advance			

== Fencing ==
13 fencers, 11 men and 2 women, represented Cuba in 1968.

Men's foil

- Dagoberto Borges
- Jesús Gil
- Orlando Ruíz

Men's team foil

- Eduardo Jhons, Orlando Ruíz, Jesús Gil, Dagoberto Borges

Men's épée

- Gustavo Oliveros
- José Antonio Díaz
- Manuel González

Men's team épée

- Orlando Ruíz, Gustavo Oliveros, Manuel González, José Antonio Díaz

Men's sabre

- Félix Delgado
- Manuel Ortíz
- José Narciso Díaz

Men's team sabre

- Manuel Ortíz, José Narciso Díaz, Joaquin Tack-Fang, Félix Delgado

Women's foil

- Milady Tack-Fang
- Margarita Rodríguez

== Shooting ==
Eight shooters, all men, represented Cuba in 1968.

50 m pistol

- Nelson Oñate
- Arturo Costa

50 m rifle, three positions

- Raúl Llanos
- Sergio Álvarez

50 m rifle, prone

- Silvio Delgado
- Enrique Guedes

Skeet

- Ignacio Huguet
- Delfin Gómez

== Swimming ==
Men

Athlete	Event	Heat		Semifinal		Final	
Athlete	Event	Time	Rank	Time	Rank	Time	Rank
Gregorio Fiallo	100 m freestyle	58.2	=48	Did not advance			
José Martínez	100 m freestyle	1:00.4	57	Did not advance			
Gregorio Fiallo	200 m freestyle	2:10.5	45	—N/a		Did not advance	
José Martínez	200 m freestyle	2:16.1	53	—N/a		Did not advance	
Gregorio Fiallo	400 m freestyle	4:41.5	29	—N/a		Did not advance	
Eliseo Vidal	100 m backstroke	1:06.4	30	Did not advance			
Eliseo Vidal	200 m backstroke	2:21.3	20	—N/a		Did not advance	
José Martínez	200 m medley	2:31.4	35	—N/a		Did not advance	
José Martínez	400 m medley	DSQ		—N/a		Did not advance	

== Water polo ==
Men's Team Competition

- Preliminary Round (Group A)
  - Lost to Soviet Union (4:11)
  - Defeated Brazil (9:2)
  - Tied with United States (6:6)
  - Defeated West Germany (7:6)
  - Defeated Spain (4:3)
  - Lost to Hungary (1:7)
- Classification Matches
  - 5th/8th place: Lost to East Germany (2:8)
  - 7th/8th place: Lost to Netherlands (5:8) → 8th place
- Team Roster
  - Guillermo Canete
  - Guillermo Martínez
  - Ibrahim Rodríguez
  - Jesús Pérez
  - Miguel García
  - Oscar Periche
  - Osvaldo García
  - Roberto Rodríguez
  - Rolando Valdes
  - Ruben Junco
  - Waldimiro Arcos
