= Cycling at the 1968 Summer Olympics – Men's track time trial =

Cycling at the Olympics

Men's track time trial at the Games of the XIX Olympiad
- Venue: Agustin Melgar Olympic Velodrome
- Date: 17 October 1968
- Competitors: 32 from 32 nations
- Winning time: 1:03.91 WR

Medalists
1st place, gold medalist(s)		Pierre Trentin; France
2nd place, silver medalist(s)		Niels Fredborg; Denmark
3rd place, bronze medalist(s)		Janusz Kierzkowski; Poland

The men's track time trial at the 1968 Summer Olympics in Mexico City, Mexico, was held on 17 October 1968. There were 32 participants from 32 nations, with each nation limited to one cyclist. The event was won by Pierre Trentin of France, the nation's first victory in the men's track time trial since 1948 and third overall (breaking a tie with Italy and Australia for most-ever in the event). In a sport where competitors rarely competed at more than one Games, Trentin was only the second man to win multiple medals in the track time trial. Niels Fredborg's silver medal was Denmark's first medal in the event since Willy Hansen's win in 1928; Fredborg would go on to be the only man to win three medals in the event. Poland earned its first ever medal in the time trial with Janusz Kierzkowski's bronze. Italy's four-Games medal streak in the event ended as Gianni Sartori took fourth.

== Background ==
This was the 10th appearance of the event, which had previously been held in 1896 and every Games since 1928. It would be held every Games until being dropped from the programme after 2004. The returning cyclists from the 1964 Games were bronze medalist Pierre Trentin of France, eighth-place finisher Roger Gibbon of Trinidad and Tobago, and thirteenth-place finisher José Mercado of Mexico. The two-time reigning world champion, and favorite in this race, was Niels Fredborg of Denmark. Gianni Sartori, the amateur world record holder, and Trentin were also significant contenders.

Barbados, Lebanon, the Philippines, Puerto Rico, and South Korea each made their debut in the men's track time trial; East and West Germany competed separately for the first time. France and Great Britain each made their 10th appearance, having competed at every appearance of the event.

== Competition format ==
The event was a time trial on the track, with each cyclist competing separately to attempt to achieve the fastest time. Each cyclist raced one kilometre from a standing start.

== Records ==
The following were the world and Olympic records prior to the competition.

World record	Gianni Sartori (ITA)	1:04.61	Mexico City, Mexico	21 October 1967
Olympic record	Sante Gaiardoni (ITA)	1:07.27	Rome, Italy	26 August 1960

The track was fast, and at altitude, and 17 of the 32 cyclists beat the old Olympic record. The first one to do so was Gianni Sartori (the world record holder), who set a time of 1:04.65. He was immediately followed by Niels Fredborg, who matched Sartori's world record of 1:04.61. That Olympic mark held until rider #24, Pierre Trentin, who broke the world record at 1:03.91.

== Schedule ==
All times are Central Standard Time (UTC-6)

Date	Time	Round
Thursday, 17 October 1968	14:00	Final

== Results ==
Rank	Cyclist	Nation	200 m	400 m	600 m	800 m	Time	Notes
1st place, gold medalist(s)	Pierre Trentin	France	16.00	27.80	39.80	52.00	1:03.91	WR
2nd place, silver medalist(s)	Niels Fredborg	Denmark	16.80	28.50	40.20	52.70	1:04.61	
3rd place, bronze medalist(s)	Janusz Kierzkowski	Poland	15.90	27.20	39.40	51.50	1:04.63	
4	Gianni Sartori	Italy	16.60	28.20	40.10	52.40	1:04.65	
5	Roger Gibbon	Trinidad and Tobago	15.70	27.20	39.20	52.00	1:04.66	
6	Leijn Loevesijn	Netherlands	17.10	28.50	40.20	52.70	1:04.84	
7	Jocelyn Lovell	Canada	16.00	27.50	39.90	52.50	1:05.18	
8	Serhiy Kravtsov	Soviet Union	16.80	28.20	40.10	52.60	1:05.21	
9	José Pittaro	Argentina	16.00	27.60	39.70	52.40	1:05.57	
10	Heinz Richter	East Germany	16.30	28.10	39.90	52.70	1:05.61	
11	Herbert Honz	West Germany	16.90	27.30	40.40	52.80	1:05.61	
12	Jackie Simes	United States	16.40	28.10	39.80	52.20	1:05.67	
13	Luis Barruffa	Uruguay	15.90	29.10	40.70	53.30	1:06.27	
14	Hilton Clarke	Australia	16.80	28.60	40.60	53.60	1:06.45	
15	Miloš Jelínek	Czechoslovakia	16.00	27.90	40.00	53.60	1:06.52	
16	Brendan McKeown	Great Britain	17.60	29.30	41.40	54.00	1:06.56	
17	Tibor Lendvai	Hungary	16.30	28.30	40.60	53.50	1:06.65	
18	Dirk Baert	Belgium	16.80	28.70	40.80	54.00	1:07.34	
19	Sanji Inoue	Japan	16.50	28.70	40.90	54.40	1:07.54	
20	Edwin Torres	Puerto Rico	17.20	29.10	41.10	54.70	1:07.65	
21	José Mercado	Mexico	16.80	28.80	41.50	54.80	1:07.97	
22	Jupp Ripfel	Sweden	17.30	29.30	41.90	55.10	1:08.65	
23	Raimo Suikkanen	Finland	17.50	29.80	42.90	56.10	1:08.92	
24	Raúl Marcelo Vázquez	Cuba	17.90	30.20	42.70	54.20	1:08.96	
25	Jorge Hernández	Colombia	16.80	29.00	41.80	55.00	1:09.24	
26	Kim Gwang-seon	South Korea	16.50	28.90	41.90	55.20	1:09.40	
27	Kensley Reece	Barbados	17.20	29.10	41.70	55.60	1:09.90	
28	Rolando Guaves	Philippines	17.20	29.50	42.50	56.20	1:10.02	
29	Pakanit Boriharnvanakhet	Thailand	17.30	29.70	42.80	56.60	1:10.66	
30	Fan Yue-tao	Taiwan	16.70	28.80	42.10	56.70	1:11.13	
31	Aubrey Bryce	Guyana	18.20	30.30	43.70	57.60	1:12.73	
32	Tarek Abou Al Dahab	Lebanon	19.70	33.40	47.60	1:02.40	1:16.18	
