= Cycling at the 1968 Summer Olympics – Men's tandem =

Cycling at the Olympics

Men's cycling tandem at the Games of the XIX Olympiad
- Venue: Olympic Velodrome, Mexico City
- Date: 20–21 October 1968
- Competitors: 28 from 14 nations

Medalists
1st place, gold medalist(s)		Daniel Morelon, Pierre Trentin	France
2nd place, silver medalist(s)		Jan Jansen, Leijn Loevesijn	Netherlands
3rd place, bronze medalist(s)		Daniel Goens, Robert Van Lancker	Belgium

The men's tandem was a cycling event at the 1968 Summer Olympics in Mexico City, Mexico, held on 20 to 21 October 1968. There were 28 participants from 14 nations.

== Competition format ==
This tandem bicycle competition involved a series of head-to-head matches. The 1968 competition involved six rounds: four main rounds (first round, quarterfinals, semifinals, and finals) as well as a two-round repechage after the first round.

- First round: The 14 teams were divided into 7 heats of 2 cyclists each. The winner of each heat advanced directly to the quarterfinal (7 teams); the loser went to the repechage (7 teams).
- Repechage: This was a two-round repechage. The repechage began with 3 heats of 2 or 3 teams each. The top team in each heat advanced to the second round, while the other team or teams in each heat were eliminated. The second round of this repechage featured a single heats of 3 teams, with the winner advancing to the quarterfinals and the losers eliminated.
- Quarterfinals: Beginning with the quarterfinals, all matches were one-on-one competitions and were held in best-of-three format. There were 4 quarterfinals, with the winner of each advancing to the semifinals and the loser eliminated.
- Semifinals: The two semifinals provided for advancement to the gold medal final for winners and to the bronze medal final for losers.
- Finals: Both a gold medal final and a bronze medal final were held.

== Results ==
=== First round ===
==== First round heat 1 ====
Rank	Cyclists	Nation	Time	Notes
1	Luigi Borghetti; Walter Gorini	Italy	10.29	Q
2	Juan Reyes; Ulises Váldez	Cuba	–	R

==== First round heat 2 ====
Rank	Cyclists	Nation	Time	Notes
1	Daniel Morelon; Pierre Trentin	France	10.39	Q
2	Guillermo Mendoza; Julio Munguía	Mexico	–	R

==== First round heat 3 ====
Rank	Cyclists	Nation	Time	Notes
1	Daniel Goens; Robert Van Lancker	Belgium	10.40	Q
2	Jack Disney; Charles Pranke	United States	–	R

==== First round heat 4 ====
Rank	Cyclists	Nation	Time	Notes
1	Miloš Jelínek; Ivan Kučírek	Czechoslovakia	10.14	Q
2	Imants Bodnieks; Igor Tselovalnikov	Soviet Union	–	R

==== First round heat 5 ====
Rank	Cyclists	Nation	Time	Notes
1	Hans-Jürgen Geschke; Werner Otto	East Germany	10.32	Q
2	András Baranyecz; Tibor Lendvai	Hungary	–	R

==== First round heat 6 ====
Rank	Cyclists	Nation	Time	Notes
1	Jan Jansen; Leijn Loevesijn	Netherlands	9.96	Q
2	Jørgen Jensen; Per Sarto Jørgensen	Denmark	–	R

==== First round heat 7 ====
Rank	Cyclists	Nation	Time	Notes
1	Klaus Kobusch; Martin Stenzel	West Germany	10.27	Q
2	Hilton Clarke; Gordon Johnson	Australia	–	R

=== Repechage heats ===
==== Repechage heat 1 ====
Rank	Cyclists	Nation	Time	Notes
1	Imants Bodnieks; Igor Tselovalnikov	Soviet Union	10.33	Q
2	Juan Reyes; Ulises Váldez	Cuba	–	
3	Guillermo Mendoza; Julio Munguía	Mexico	–	

==== Repechage heat 2 ====
Rank	Cyclists	Nation	Time	Notes
1	András Baranyecz; Tibor Lendvai	Hungary	10.23	Q
2	Jørgen Jensen; Per Sarto Jørgensen	Denmark	–	

==== Repechage heat 3 ====
Rank	Cyclists	Nation	Time	Notes
1	Hilton Clarke; Gordon Johnson	Australia	10.26	Q
2	Jack Disney; Charles Pranke	United States	–	

=== Repechage final ===
Rank	Cyclists	Nation	Time	Notes
1	Imants Bodnieks; Igor Tselovalnikov	Soviet Union	10.32	Q
2	András Baranyecz; Tibor Lendvai	Hungary	–	
3	Hilton Clarke; Gordon Johnson	Australia	–	

=== Quarterfinals ===
==== Quarterfinal 1 ====
Rank	Cyclists	Nation	Race 1		Race 2		Race 3		Notes
Rank	Cyclists	Nation	Rank	Time	Rank	Time	Rank	Time	Notes
1	Luigi Borghetti; Walter Gorini	Italy	1	10.03	1	10.21	—N/a		Q
2	Imants Bodnieks; Igor Tselovalnikov	Soviet Union	2	–	2	–	—N/a		

==== Quarterfinal 2 ====
Rank	Cyclists	Nation	Race 1		Race 2		Race 3		Notes
Rank	Cyclists	Nation	Rank	Time	Rank	Time	Rank	Time	Notes
1	Daniel Morelon; Pierre Trentin	France	1	10.01	1	9.93	—N/a		Q
2	Klaus Kobusch; Martin Stenzel	West Germany	2	–	2	–	—N/a		

==== Quarterfinal 3 ====
Rank	Cyclists	Nation	Race 1		Race 2		Race 3		Notes
Rank	Cyclists	Nation	Rank	Time	Rank	Time	Rank	Time	Notes
1	Jan Jansen; Leijn Loevesijn	Netherlands	2	–	1	9.88	1	10.03	Q
2	Miloš Jelínek; Ivan Kučírek	Czechoslovakia	1	10.63	2	–	2	–	

==== Quarterfinal 4 ====
Rank	Cyclists	Nation	Race 1		Race 2		Race 3		Notes
Rank	Cyclists	Nation	Rank	Time	Rank	Time	Rank	Time	Notes
1	Daniel Goens; Robert Van Lancker	Belgium	1	10.25	2	–	1	10.06	Q
2	Hans-Jürgen Geschke; Werner Otto	East Germany	2	–	1	10.17	2	–	

=== Semifinals ===
==== Semifinal 1 ====
Rank	Cyclists	Nation	Race 1		Race 2		Race 3		Notes
Rank	Cyclists	Nation	Rank	Time	Rank	Time	Rank	Time	Notes
1	Jan Jansen; Leijn Loevesijn	Netherlands	2	–	1	10.10	1	10.34	Q
2	Luigi Borghetti; Walter Gorini	Italy	1	9.96	2	–	2	–	B

==== Semifinal 2 ====
Rank	Cyclists	Nation	Race 1		Race 2		Race 3		Notes
Rank	Cyclists	Nation	Rank	Time	Rank	Time	Rank	Time	Notes
1	Daniel Morelon; Pierre Trentin	France	1	10.24	1	10.60	—N/a		Q
2	Daniel Goens; Robert Van Lancker	Belgium	2	–	2	–	—N/a		B

=== Finals ===
==== Bronze medal match ====
Rank	Cyclists	Nation	Race 1		Race 2		Race 3	
Rank	Cyclists	Nation	Rank	Time	Rank	Time	Rank	Time
3rd place, bronze medalist(s)	Daniel Goens; Robert Van Lancker	Belgium	1	10.60	1	11.20	—N/a	
4	Luigi Borghetti; Walter Gorini	Italy	2	–	2	–	—N/a	

==== Final ====
Rank	Cyclists	Nation	Race 1		Race 2		Race 3	
Rank	Cyclists	Nation	Rank	Time	Rank	Time	Rank	Time
1st place, gold medalist(s)	Daniel Morelon; Pierre Trentin	France	1	10.03	1	9.83	—N/a	
2nd place, silver medalist(s)	Jan Jansen; Leijn Loevesijn	Netherlands	2	–	2	–	—N/a	

== Final classification ==
Rank	Name	Nationality
1st place, gold medalist(s)	Daniel Morelon; Pierre Trentin	France
2nd place, silver medalist(s)	Jan Jansen; Leijn Loevesijn	Netherlands
3rd place, bronze medalist(s)	Daniel Goens; Robert Van Lancker	Belgium
4	Walter Gorini; Luigi Borghetti	Italy
5	Klaus Kobusch; Martin Stenzel	West Germany
5	Werner Otto; Hans-Jürgen Geschke	East Germany
5	Ivan Kučírek; Miloš Jelínek	Czechoslovakia
5	Igor Tselovalnikov; Imants Bodnieks	Soviet Union
9	András Baranyecz; Tibor Lendvai	Hungary
10	Gordon Johnson; Hilton Clarke	Australia
11	Juan Reyes; Ulises Váldez	Cuba
11	Per Sarto Jørgensen; Jørgen Jensen	Denmark
11	Jack Disney; Charles Pranke	United States
11	Julio Munguía; Guillermo Mendoza	Mexico
