= Thailand at the 1968 Summer Olympics =

- IOC code: THA
- NOC: National Olympic Committee of Thailand

in Mexico City
- Competitors: 41 in 6 sports
- Medals: Gold 0 Silver 0 Bronze 0 Total 0

Summer Olympics appearances (overview)
- 1952; 1956; 1960; 1964; 1968; 1972; 1976; 1980; 1984; 1988; 1992; 1996; 2000; 2004; 2008; 2012; 2016; 2020; 2024

Thailand competed at the 1968 Summer Olympics in Mexico City, Mexico. 41 competitors, all men, took part in 18 events in 6 sports.

== Boxing ==
Men's Flyweight

- Prapan Duangchaoom

Men's Bantamweight

- Cherdchai Udompaichitkul

Men's Light Welterweight

- Niyom Prasertsom

== Cycling ==
Seven cyclists represented Thailand in 1968.

Individual road race

- Somchai Chantarasamrit
- Suriyong Hemint
- Somkuan Seehapant
- Chainarong Sophonpong

Sprint

- Pakanit Boriharnvanakhet
- Kriengsak Varavudhi

1000m time trial

- Pakanit Boriharnvanakhet

Individual pursuit

- Pakanit Boriharnvanakhet

Team pursuit

- Pakanit Boriharnvanakhet
- Somchai Chantarasamrit
- Boontom Prasongquamdee
- Chainarong Sophonpong

== Shooting ==
Eleven shooters, all men, represented Thailand in 1968.

25 m pistol

- Rangsit Yanothai
- Taweesak Kasiwat

50 m pistol

- Sutham Aswanit
- Amorn Yuktanandana

50 m rifle, three positions

- Charumai Mahawat
- Vinich Chareonsiri

50 m rifle, prone

- Udomsak Theinthong
- Choomphol Chaiyanitr

Trap

- Pavitr Kachasanee
- Dipya Mongkollugsana

Skeet

- Boonkua Lourvanij
