= Raul Vazquez =

Raul Vazquez may refer to:

- Raúl Marcelo Vázquez (born 1948), Cuban cyclist
- Raul Vazquez (physician) (born 1963), Puerto-Rican primary care physician and philanthropist
