= Daniel Morelon =

French cyclist

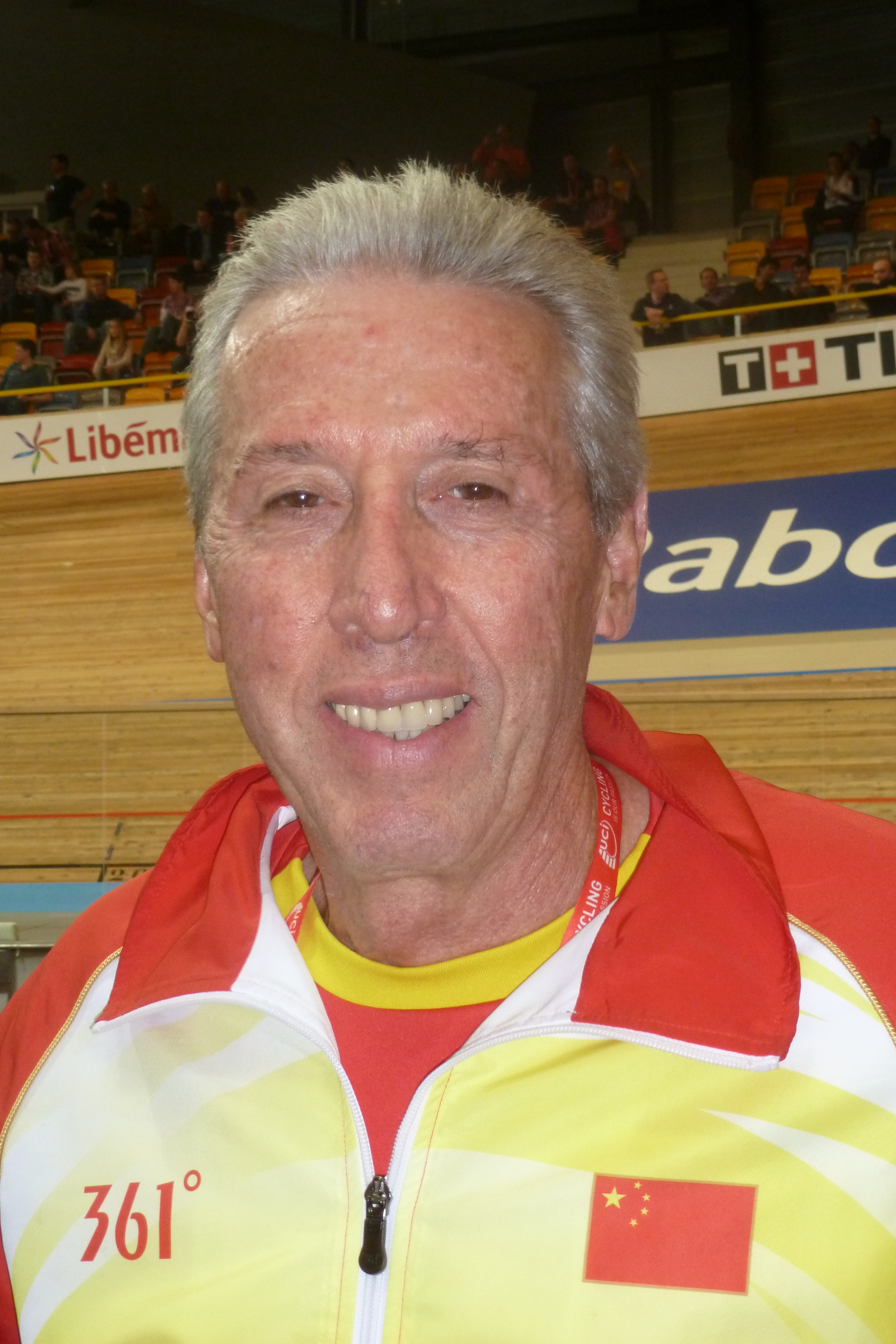
- Morelon in 2011

Personal information
- Born: 24 July 1944 (age 82) Bourg-en-Bresse, France
- Height: 1.81 m (5 ft 11 in)
- Weight: 79 kg (174 lb)

Sport
- Sport: Cycling
Medal record
Representing France
Olympic Games
Gold medal – first place	1968 Mexico City	1 km sprint
Gold medal – first place	1968 Mexico City	2 km tandem
Gold medal – first place	1972 Munich	1 km sprint
Silver medal – second place	1976 Montreal	1 km sprint
Bronze medal – third place	1964 Tokyo	1 km sprint
Track World Championships
Gold medal – first place	1966 Frankfurt	Sprint
Gold medal – first place	1966 Frankfurt	Tandem
Gold medal – first place	1967 Amsterdam	Sprint
Gold medal – first place	1969 Brno	Sprint
Gold medal – first place	1970 Leicester	Sprint
Gold medal – first place	1971 Varese	Sprint
Gold medal – first place	1973 San Sebastian	Sprint
Gold medal – first place	1975 Liege	Sprint
Silver medal – second place	1964 Paris	Sprint
Silver medal – second place	1967 Amsterdam	Tandem
Silver medal – second place	Besançon 1980	Keirin
Bronze medal – third place	1965 San Sebastian	Sprint
Bronze medal – third place	1969 Brno	Tandem
Bronze medal – third place	1970 Leicester	Tandem
Bronze medal – third place	1971 Varese	Tandem
Bronze medal – third place	Besançon 1980	Sprint

Daniel Morelon (born 24 July 1944) is a retired French racing cyclist who was active between 1963 and 1980. He is a triple Olympic champion, eight times world champion, and a Knight of the National Order of Merit (Chevalier de l’Ordre national du Mérite). Morelon was a police officer before becoming a cycling coach.

== Cycling career ==
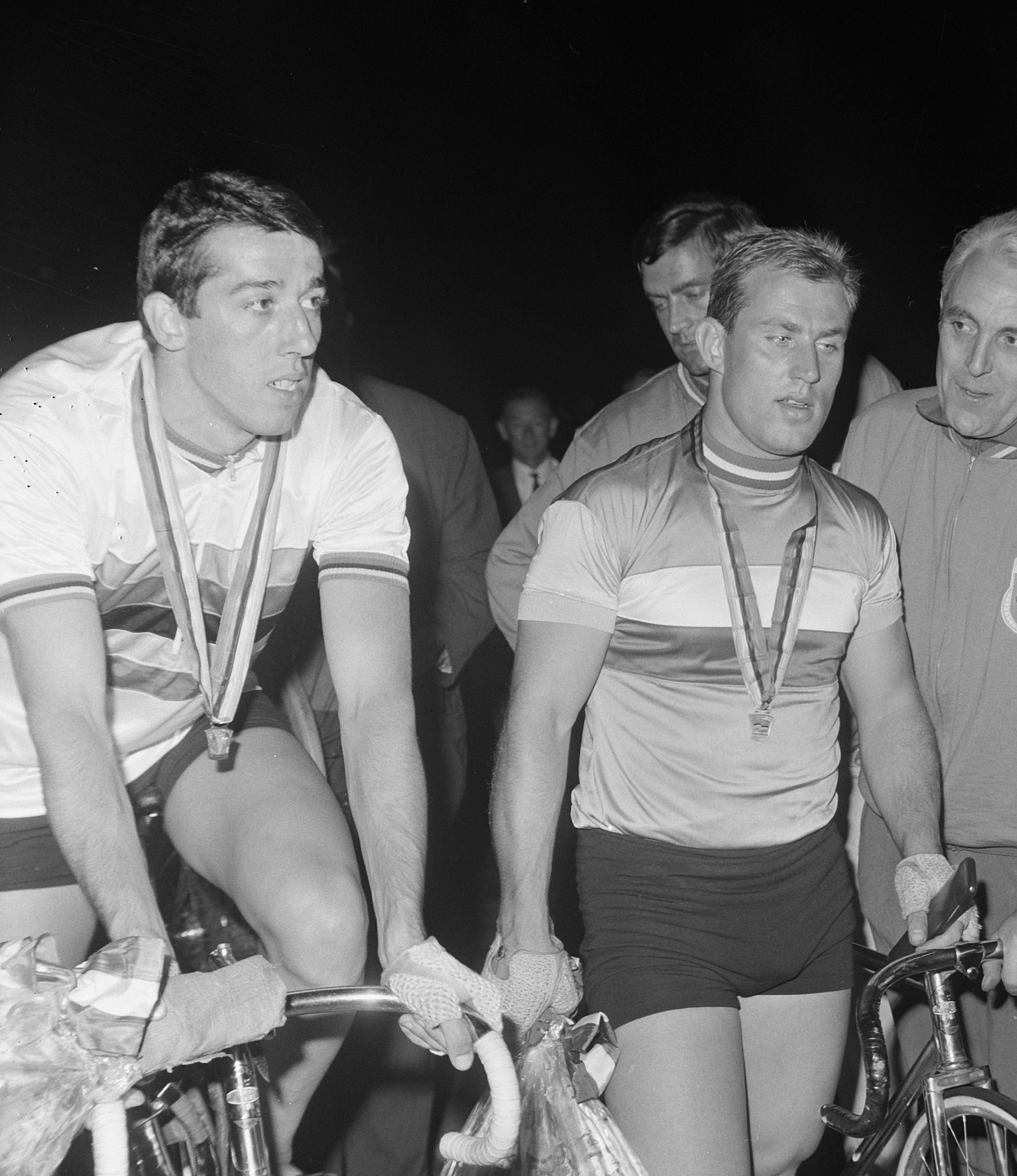
Morelon (left) and Trentin at the 1967 world championships

Morelon came into cycling after going to races with his two brothers. He said:

My father was mad about cycling but he didn't have the chance to race, except a couple of times in secret. It was he who gave the vuris to my elder brothers. At 10, I went to see them racing and I rode 100 km on my mother's bike.

He joined the Vélo Club Bressan at 15. He won 11 races in the youth class and came second nine times out of 25 races. He came third in the national youth championship on the road and moved to the track after a training session in Paris.

I discovered the track by chance, during the Olympic Games in Rome in 1960. I saw Gaiardoni win. I said to myself 'I like that.' My first race on the track was the Rustine kilometre in Paris, in 1962. That was on the Cipale track. I'd never ridden on a track. It was Toto Gérardin who taught me, over a week. I finished second behind Pierre Trentin I remember that I rode all the sprints out of the saddle in the straight. And I fell off. I'd forgotten that you can't freewheel with a fixed gear. I rode the track again the following year and I was contacted for a tournament between France and Germany... in the team pursuit. That wasn't surprising because I was still considered a roadman at that time.

Morelon was called up to the army in November 1963. He joined the national sports institute, INSEP, and began training at an international level.

It was in 1964 that I specialised in the sprint. The click was my victory in the Grand Prix of Copenhagen over Patrick Sercu. I'd beaten the world champion; I could beat anybody in the world.

Morelon and Trentin were matched for the bronze medal in the Olympic Games in Tokyo in 1964. Trentin was unsettled by his disqualification against the Italian, Pettenela, in the semi-final and lost to Morelon after forcing him to a third ride.

The opposition between Trentin and Morelon continued until 1966. Trentin specialised in the kilometre, taking the world championship in 1966. Morelon took the sprint championship. The two then combined to ride the tandem sprint. Trentin said: "I'm the second fastest in the sprint and the fastest in the kilometre. Who's going to beat us on a tandem?"

Morelon took the world title the following year, again ahead of Trentin, but despite Trentin's confidence they failed in the tandem final. In 1966, 1968, 1971 and 1973 he won the International Champion of Champions sprint at Herne Hill velodrome.

The 1968 Olympic Games were at altitude in Mexico. Trentin, suffering from the height, saw Morelon record the best kilometre time in training. The team manager, Louis Gérardin, nevertheless named Trentin for the event and he won in a world record. Two days later, Morelon easily won the sprint against Giordano Turrini. Two days later, Trentin and Morelon won the tandem.

Morelon took his third world title in 1969 and a silver on the tandem. He repeated the performance in 1970, but with Gérard Quintyn as tandem partner. Trentin and Morelon teamed up again for the tandem in 1971, and took the bronze. Morelon won his fifth sprint title.

Morelon was favourite at his third Olympic Games. He disposed of the Australian John Nicholson in two rides, although the second needed a photo-finish. Morelon took further world titles in 1973 and 1975.

At his fourth Olympics, in Montreal, Morelon faced the unknown Slovak Anton Tkáč in the final. He lost the first round after leading but being passed on the line. He won the second and was outridden in the third. The Slovak tried a long sprint, longer than Morelon could believe. "I couldn't believe that he was serious," Morelon said. "I was too far back. I didn't realise what was happening until I was beaten. I told myself there was still a lap and I couldn't believe that it was over." Morelon took the silver, his fifth medal in four Olympics.

Georges Decoeudres, of the Tribune de Lausanne, wrote:

In the first round, where he had easily passed Morelon in the last banking, Anton Tkac beat the track record in 10.89 seconds. In the second round, though, he had to submit to a very attentive Morelon. The Czech started the sprint at 200m from the line but the Frenchman matched him and led with a lap to go. Beaten, the Czech surrendered and waited for the third round. It was a passionate affair. Tkac attacked in the penultimate banking. The Frenchman, left at four metres, gave the impression that he could come back – he immediately started chasing – but the Czech kept his lead right up to the line. Morelon was irremediably beaten and sat up before the finish.

== Retirement and coaching ==
Morelon stopped racing in 1977 and succeeded Gérardin as national coach. In 1980, though, he returned as a professional and took the bronze medal in the sprint and silver in the keirin, as well as winning the European sprint championship. He had previously said: "If I turn professional, I would no longer be able to devote myself exclusively to the sprint, because international matches are rare. Well, I want to stay a sprinter." He was given time off by the sports ministry, his employer as national coach, to train. He told journalists: "Look, you mustn't go away and write that Daniel Morelon, the old champion, is going to fall out of the clouds and run off with all the big prizes. But you can say that, provided I can prepare properly, I will play a more than prominent role in the way the races develop."

In 1990, he became head of the training centre at Hyères, on a new track. A rivalry started between Hyères and the northern training centre in Paris. There, Florian Rousseau was coached by Gérard Quintyn while Morelon trained Laurent Gané at Hyères. The result was a golden age of French sprinting, with all the world championships from 1997 to 2001 and the Olympic Games in 2000.

The revival started with the arrival of Frédéric Magné, Colas and Denys Lemyre, who had been world sprint champion with the juniors. Setting up two centres of training brought a rivalry. After the fall of the Berlin Wall, Gérard went to Germany to find papers on training. "We worked more on muscle-building, made our sessions more methodical, so we had training sessions for speed and others for strength and endurance. But we also worked out our own programme, both Gérard and I adding our personal touches. We also had the luck to fall on an exceptional generation" Magné, Florian Rousseau, Félicia Ballanger Gané. "It was a golden generation for French track racing."

Morelon reached retirement age after the 2005 Olympics in Los Angeles and both he and Quintyn retired. Italy recruited him, but in March 2007 he chose to work with China. "My job is to look after Guo Shuang", he said. "The Chinese federation has invested a lot in her." He took Shuang to two silver medals in the sprint and keirin at world championships but without the same success at the Beijing Olympics.

Rather than move to China, Morelon brought his best riders to train in France. He said it would be his last competition.

== Achievements as trainer ==
- Trainer to Félicia Ballanger at Olympic Games in sprint, 1996 and 2000
- Trainer to Félicia Ballanger at Olympic Games in 500 m, 2000
- Trainer to Nathalie Even-Lancien at Olympic Games in Points race, 1996
- 15 World Champion titles
- 7 Silver World Championship medals
- 6 Bronze World Championship medals

== See also ==
- List of multiple Summer Olympic medalists
