= 1976 UCI Track Cycling World Championships =

- Venue: Monteroni di Lecce, Italy
- Date: 7–10 September 1976
- Velodrome: Ulivi Velodrome
- Events: 7

The 1976 UCI Track Cycling World Championships were the World Championship for track cycling. They took place in Monteroni di Lecce, Italy in 1976. Due to the 1976 Summer Olympics only seven events were contested, 5 for men (3 for professionals, 2 for amateurs) and 2 for women.

In the same period, the 1976 UCI Road World Championships were organized in Ostuni.

== Medal summary ==
| Event | Gold | Silver | Bronze |
|---|---|---|---|
Men's Professional Events
| Men's sprint | John Nicholson; Australia | Giordano Turrini; Italy | Yoshikazu Sugata (菅田順和); Japan |
| Men's individual pursuit | Francesco Moser; Italy | Roy Schuiten; Netherlands | Knut Knudsen; Norway |
| Men's motor-paced | Wilfried Peffgen; West Germany | Cees Stam; Netherlands | Walter Avogradi; Italy |
Men's Amateur Events
| Men's motor-paced | Gaby Minneboo; Netherlands | Bartolome Caldentey; Spain | Rainer Podlesch; West Germany |
| Men's tandem | Poland; Benedykt Kocot; Janusz Kotlinski | Czechoslovakia; Ivan Kučírek; Miloš Jelínek | Soviet Union; Anatoly Iablunowsky; Vladimir Semenets |
Women's Events
| Women's sprint | Sheila Young; United States | Sue Novara; United States | Iva Zajíčková; Czechoslovakia |
| Women's individual pursuit | Keetie van Oosten-Hage; Netherlands | Luigina Bissoli; Italy | Mary Jane Reoch; United States |

== Medal table ==
| Rank | Nation | Gold | Silver | Bronze | Total |
|---|---|---|---|---|---|
| 1 | Netherlands (NED) | 2 | 2 | 0 | 4 |
| 2 | Italy (ITA) | 1 | 2 | 1 | 4 |
| 3 | United States (USA) | 1 | 1 | 1 | 3 |
| 4 | West Germany (FRG) | 1 | 0 | 1 | 2 |
| 5 | Australia (AUS) | 1 | 0 | 0 | 1 |
| 5 | Poland (POL) | 1 | 0 | 0 | 1 |
| 7 | Czechoslovakia (TCH) | 0 | 1 | 1 | 2 |
| 8 | Spain (ESP) | 0 | 1 | 0 | 1 |
| 9 | Japan (JPN) | 0 | 0 | 1 | 1 |
| 9 | Norway (NOR) | 0 | 0 | 1 | 1 |
| 9 | Soviet Union (URS) | 0 | 0 | 1 | 1 |
| Totals (11 entries) | | 7 | 7 | 7 | 21 |

== See also ==
- 1976 UCI Road World Championships
