= Jaroslav Navrátil =

Jaroslav Navrátil may refer to:

- Jaroslav Navrátil (tennis) (born 1957), former tennis player from Czechoslovakia
- Jaroslav Navrátil (footballer) (born 1991), Czech footballer
- Jaroslav Navrátil (sport shooter) (born 1943), Czech Olympic shooter
