= Jørgen Jensen =

Jørgen Jensen may refer to:

- Jørgen Martinius Jensen (1878–1970), Norwegian military officer, sports official, and equestrian
- Jørgen Jensen (soldier) (1891–1922), Danish-born Australian recipient of the Victoria Cross
- Jørgen Jensen (politician) (1920–1987), Danish trade unionist and politician
- Jørgen Jensen (wrestler) (1939-1995), Danish Olympic wrestler
- Jørgen Jensen (runner) (1944–2009), long-distance runner from Denmark
- Jørgen Jensen (cyclist) (1947–2015), Danish Olympic cyclist
- Jørgen Juul Jensen (born 1965), Danish football player

== See also ==
- Jensen (surname)
