= Pittaro =

Pittaro is a surname. Notable people with the surname include:

- Chris Pittaro (born 1961), American baseball player
- José Pittaro (born 1946), Argentine cyclist
- Sonny Pittaro, American baseball coach
  - Sonny Pittaro Field in New Jersey, U.S.
