= Alberto Moreno (disambiguation) =

Alberto Moreno (born 1992) is a Spanish footballer.

Alberto Moreno may also refer to:

- Jorge Alberto Negrete Moreno (1911–1953), Mexican singer and actor
- Alberto Moreno (politician) (born 1941), Peruvian politician
- Alberto Moreno (diver) (born 1950), Cuban diver
- Luis Alberto Moreno (born 1953), Colombian businessman and politician
- Julio Alberto Moreno Casas (born 1958), Spanish footballer
- Tito (footballer, born May 1985), full name Alberto Ortiz Moreno, Spanish footballer
- Carlos Sánchez (Colombian footballer), (born 1986; full name Carlos Alberto Sánchez Moreno), Colombian footballer
- Jesús Alberto Moreno Salas (born 1990), Mexican footballer
- Junior Alberto Moreno (born 2000), Venezuelan footballer
- Alberto Moreno, member of rock group Museo Rosenbach
