= Juan Reyes =

Juan Reyes may refer to:

- Juan Francisco Reyes (1938–2019), Vice President of Guatemala, 2000–2004
- Juan Francisco Reyes (soldier) (1749–1809), Spanish soldier and colonial politician
- Juan D. Reyes (born 1968), Republican politician and attorney in New York City
- Juan Ignacio Reyes (born 1981), Paralympic swimmer
- Juan Pablo Reyes (born 1985), Ecuadorian footballer
- Juan Carlos Reyes (governor) (died 2007), de facto Federal Interventor of Córdoba, Argentina, 1970
- Juan Carlos Reyes (footballer) (born 1976), retired Uruguayan footballer
- Juan Reyes (cyclist) (born 1944), Cuban Olympic cyclist
