= Shooting at the 1968 Summer Olympics – Mixed 50 metre rifle three positions =

Sports shooting at the Olympics

Mixed 50 metre rifle three positions at the Games of the XIX Olympiad
- Venue: Mexico City, Mexico
- Date: 21 October 1968
- Competitors: 62 from 35 nations

Medalists
1st place, gold medalist(s)		Bernd Klingner	West Germany
2nd place, silver medalist(s)		John Writer	United States
3rd place, bronze medalist(s)		Vitaly Parkhimovich	Soviet Union

The Mixed 50 metre rifle three positions event was a shooting sports event held as part of the Shooting at the 1968 Summer Olympics programme. It was the fifth appearance of the event. The competition was held on 21 October 1968 at the shooting ranges in Mexico City. 62 shooters from 35 nations competed.

== Results ==
Place	Shooter	Total
1	Bernd Klingner (FRG)	1157
2	John Writer (USA)	1156
3	Vitaly Parkhimovich (URS)	1154
4	John Foster (USA)	1153
5	José González (MEX)	1152
6	Gerry Ouellette (CAN)	1151
7	Peter Kohnke (FRG)	1151
8	Kurt Müller (SUI)	1151
9	Bjørn Bakken (NOR)	1150
10	Vladimir Konyakhin (URS)	1147
11	Slobodan Paunović (YUG)	1147
12	Nicolae Rotaru (ROU)	1146
13	László Hammerl (HUN)	1146
14	Guido Loacker (AUT)	1146
15	Frans Lafortune (BEL)	1145
16	Raúl Llanos (CUB)	1145
17	Uto Wunderlich (GDR)	1145
18	Sven Johansson (SWE)	1144
19	Elling Øvergård (NOR)	1144
20	Kurt Johansson (SWE)	1143
21	Martsel Koen (BUL)	1142
22	Ole Hviid Jensen (DEN)	1140
23	Ion Olărescu (ROU)	1140
24	Jerzy Nowicki (POL)	1140
25	Ryszard Fandier (POL)	1139
26	Hartmut Sommer (GDR)	1138
27	Mendbayaryn Jantsankhorloo (MGL)	1136
28	Don Tolhurst (AUS)	1136
29	Jan Kůrka (TCH)	1136
30	Peter Ruch (SUI)	1135
31	Vladimir Grozdanović (YUG)	1134
32	Wolfram Waibel, Sr. (AUT)	1133
33	Simo Morri (FIN)	1133
34	Adolfo Feliciano (PHI)	1133
35	Ferenc Petrovácz (HUN)	1132
36	Jaakko Minkkinen (FIN)	1132
37	Giuseppe De Chirico (ITA)	1130
38	Alf Mayer (CAN)	1127
39	Jaroslav Navrátil (TCH)	1127
40	Per Weichel (DEN)	1127
41	Henry Herscovici (ISR)	1124
42	Luis del Cerro (ESP)	1123
43	Sergio Álvarez (CUB)	1122
44	Wu Tao-yan (TPE)	1121
45	Emiliyan Vergov (BUL)	1119
46	José María Pigrau (ESP)	1117
47	Olegario Vázquez (MEX)	1116
48	Yondonjamtsyn Batsükh (MGL)	1114
49	José Lei (HKG)	1112
50	Leopoldo Ang (PHI)	1098
51	Zelig Shtroch (ISR)	1095
52	Juan Llabot (VEN)	1094
53	Otto Brolo (GUA)	1092
54	Mehmet Dursun (TUR)	1081
55	Edmar de Salles (BRA)	1077
56	Leonel Fernández (GUA)	1068
57	Hugo Chamberlain (CRC)	1064
58	Charumai Mahawat (THA)	1054
59	Helio Castro (ESA)	1046
60	Vinich Chareonsiri (THA)	1037
61	Pan Kou-ang (TPE)	1020
62	Juan Antonio Valencia (ESA)	1013
