= Honz =

Honz is a German surname. Notable people with the surname include:

- Herbert Honz (born 1942), German cyclist
- Karl Honz (born 1951), West German sprinter
