= Bernd Klingner =

German sport shooter

Personal information
- Born: 28 January 1940 (age 86) Oberlichtenau, Germany

Sport
- Sport: Sport shooting
Medal record
Men's shooting
Representing West Germany
Olympic Games
Gold medal – first place	1968 Mexico City	Small-bore Rifle, 3 Positions

Bernd Klingner (born 28 January 1940) is a German sport shooter who won a gold medal at the 1968 Summer Olympics in the small bore rifle, three positions event. He also competed at the 1960 Summer Olympics and the 1972 Summer Olympics.
