= Rolando Guaves =

Filipino cyclist

Personal information
- Born: January 8, 1945 (age 81) Aloran, Misamis Occidental, Philippine Commonwealth
- Height: 165 cm (5 ft 5 in)
- Weight: 59 kg (130 lb)

Cycling career
- Sport: Cycling

Rolando Guaves (born January 8, 1945) is a Filipino former cyclist. He competed in the sprint and the 1000m time trial at the 1968 Summer Olympics.
