= Edwin Torres (cyclist) =

Puerto Rican cyclist

Personal information
- Born: 29 December 1946 (age 79) Humacao, Puerto Rico

Cycling career
- Sport: Cycling

Edwin Torres (born 29 December 1946) is a former Puerto Rican cyclist. He competed in the sprint and the 1000m time trial at the 1968 Summer Olympics.
