= András Baranyecz =

Hungarian cyclist

Personal information
- Born: 23 February 1946 Budapest, Hungary
- Died: 5 January 2010 (aged 63)
- Height: 5 ft 11 in (180 cm)
- Weight: 72 kg (159 lb)

Cycling career
- Sport: Cycling

András Baranyecz (23 February 1946 – 5 January 2010) was a Hungarian cyclist. He competed in the men's sprint and the men's tandem events at the 1968 Summer Olympics.
