= Luis Barruffa =

Uruguayan cyclist (1946–2021)

Personal information
- Born: 11 February 1946 Montevideo, Uruguay
- Died: 8 February 2021 (aged 74)

Cycling career
- Sport: Cycling

Luis Barruffa (11 February 1946 – 8 February 2021) was a Uruguayan cyclist. He competed in the 1000m time trial at the 1968 Summer Olympics.
