= Aubrey Bryce =

Guyanese cyclist

Personal information
- Born: 10 July 1949 (age 77) Demerara, Guyana

Cycling career
- Sport: Cycling

Aubrey Bryce (born 10 July 1949) is a Guyanese former cyclist. He competed in the sprint and the 1000m time trial at the 1968 Summer Olympics.
