= Bob Boucher (cyclist) =

Canadian cyclist and speed skater (born 1943)

Personal information
- Born: 12 June 1943 (age 83) Halifax, Nova Scotia, Canada

Cycling career
- Sport: Cycling

Robert Boucher (born 12 June 1943) is a Canadian former cyclist and speed skater.

In December 1962, he went to Europe as part of the national team composing of eight Canadian speed skaters, for a six-week training project in Sweden. At that time he lived in Winnipeg. He competed in the cycling sprint event at the 1968 Summer Olympics and the 500m speed skating event at the 1968 Winter Olympics.

Boucher was inducted into the Manitoba Sports Hall of Fame in 1994 for speed skating.
