= Héctor Urrego =

Colombian cyclist

Personal information
- Born: 5 February 1945 (age 81) Bogotá, Colombia
- Height: 5 ft 7 in (170 cm)
- Weight: 71 kg (157 lb)

Cycling career
- Sport: Cycling

Héctor Urrego (born 5 February 1945) is a former Colombian cyclist, turned journalist. He competed in the men's sprint at the 1968 Summer Olympics.
