= Harrie Jansen =

Dutch cyclist

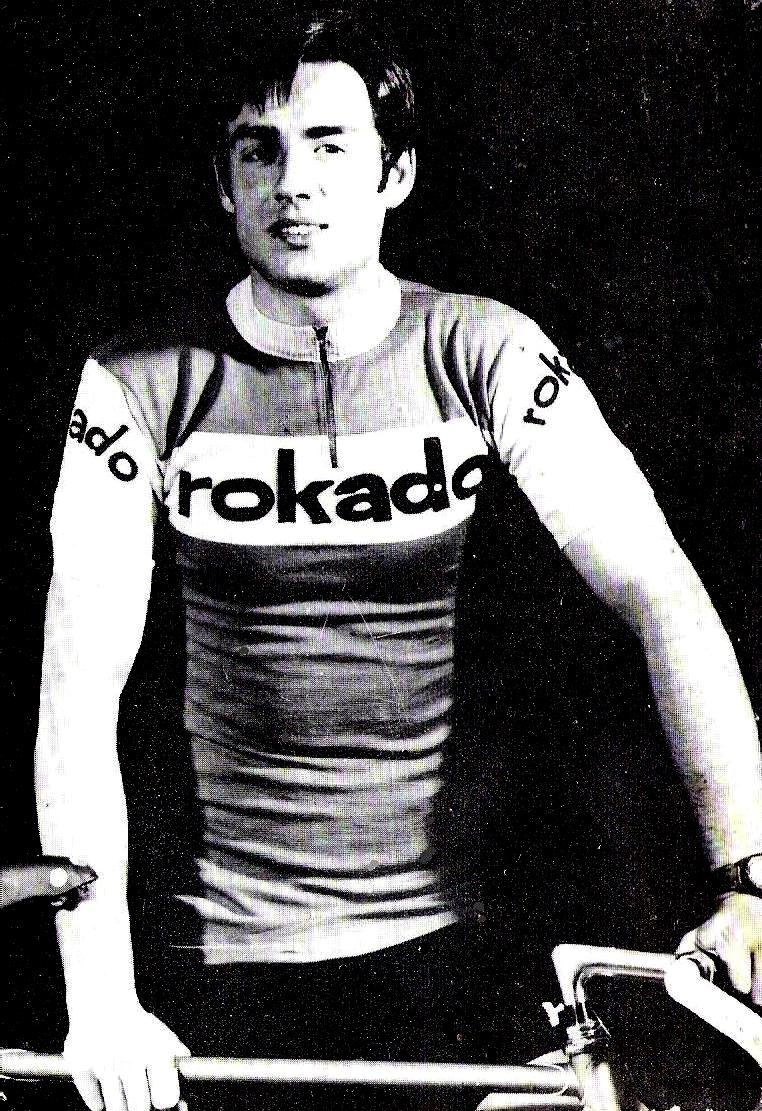
- Harrie Jansen, 1972

Personal information
- Born: 25 January 1947 (age 79) Amsterdam, Netherlands

Cycling career
- Sport: Cycling

Harrie Jansen (born 25 January 1947) is a former Dutch racing cyclist.

He was born in Amsterdam and is a brother of Jan Jansen. At the 1968 Summer Olympics he finished 24th in the road race.

== See also ==
- List of Dutch Olympic cyclists
