= Kenneth Sutherland (cyclist) =

Belizean cyclist

Personal information
- Born: 23 April 1943 (age 83) Belize City, Belize

Cycling career
- Sport: Cycling

Kenneth Charles Sutherland (born 23 April 1943) is a former Belizean cyclist. He competed in the sprint event at the 1968 Summer Olympics.
