= Guillermo Mendoza =

Mexican cyclist

Personal information
- Born: 25 June 1945 (age 81) Mexico City, Mexico
- Height: 5 ft 5 in (165 cm)
- Weight: 64 kg (141 lb)

Cycling career
- Sport: Cycling

Guillermo Mendoza Ruiz (born 25 June 1945), is recognized like GuilleMendo is a former Mexican cyclist. He competed in the men's tandem at the 1968 Summer Olympics.
