= Bruno Gonzato =

Italian cyclist

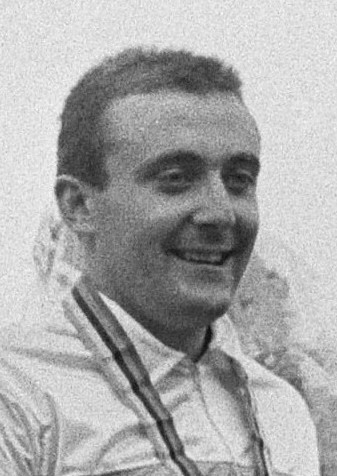
- Bruno Gonzato at the 1967 World Championships

Personal information
- Born: 20 May 1944 (age 82) Schio, Italy

Sport
- Sport: Cycling
Medal record
Representing Italy
World Championships
Gold medal – first place	1967 Amsterdam	Tandem

Bruno Gonzato (born 20 March 1944) is a retired Italian track cyclist. In 1967, he won the tandem events at the national and World Championships, together with Dino Verzini; they also finished second at the 1969 Italian Championships.
