= Janusz Kierzkowski =

Polish cyclist (1947–2011)

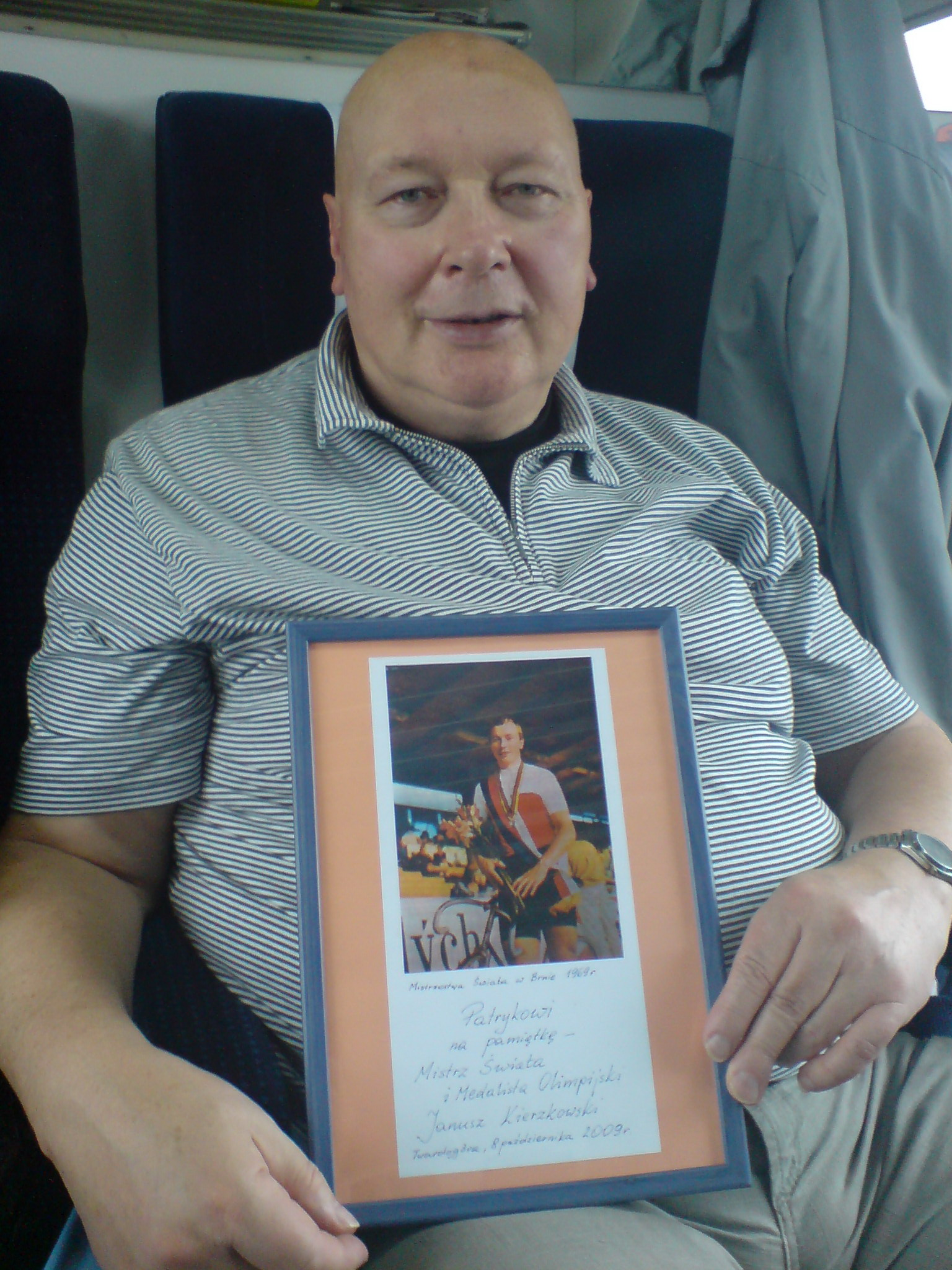
- Janusz Kierzkowski in 2009

Personal information
- Born: 26 February 1947 Borek, Poland
- Died: 19 August 2011 (aged 64) Wrocław, Poland
- Height: 6 ft 1 in (185 cm)
- Weight: 88 kg (194 lb)

Cycling career
- Sport: Cycling
Medal record
Janusz Kierzkowski
Medal record
Men's cycling
Representing Poland
Olympic Games
Bronze medal – third place	1968 Mexico City	1000m time trial

Janusz Kazimierz Kierzkowski (26 February 1947 – 19 August 2011) was a Polish cyclist. He won a bronze medal in the 1000m time trial at the 1968 Summer Olympics.
