= Tibor Lendvai =

Hungarian cyclist (1940–2023)

Personal information
- Born: 1 February 1940 Budapest, Hungary
- Died: 1 August 2023 (aged 83)
- Height: 6 ft 0 in (183 cm)
- Weight: 77 kg (170 lb)

Cycling career
- Sport: Cycling

Tibor Lendvai (1 February 1940 – 1 August 2023) was a Hungarian cyclist. He competed in the 1000m time trial and the men's tandem events at the 1968 Summer Olympics.

Lendvai died on 1 August 2023, at the age of 83.
