= Julio Munguía =

Mexican cyclist

Personal information
- Born: 25 April 1942 (age 84) Mexico City, Mexico
- Height: 5 ft 6 in (168 cm)
- Weight: 65 kg (143 lb)

Cycling career
- Sport: Cycling

Julio Munguía (born 25 April 1942) is a former Mexican cyclist. He competed in the men's tandem at the 1968 Summer Olympics.
