= Kensley Reece =

Barbadian cyclist

Personal information
- Full name: Alva Kensley Reece
- Born: 26 June 1945 (age 81) Barbados
- Height: 170 cm (5 ft 7 in)
- Weight: 68 kg (150 lb)

Cycling career
- Sport: Cycling

Alva Kensley Reece (born 26 June 1945) is a former Barbadian road and track cyclist. He was the national record holder.

Reece is one of the athletes who competed in multiple sports at the Summer Olympic games. He competed at the 1968 Summer Olympics as a road cyclist in the men's individual road race and as a track cyclist in the men's sprint and men's track time trial. He set a new national record at the 1968 Olympics, where he was part of Barbados's first ever independent Olympic team. At the 1972 Summer Olympics he also competed in both road cycling and track cycling events.

He later coached Charles Pile.
