= Martin Stenzel =

German cyclist

Personal information
- Born: 18 July 1946 (age 80) Bad Landeck, Schlesien
- Height: 5 ft 11 in (180 cm)
- Weight: 80 kg (180 lb)

Cycling career
- Sport: Cycling

Martin Stenzel (born 18 July 1946) is a former German cyclist. He competed in the men's tandem at the 1968 Summer Olympics.
