= Peter Ruch =

Swiss sports shooter (born 1941)

Personal information
- Born: 8 April 1941 (age 85) Bern, Switzerland

Sport
- Sport: Sports shooting

Peter Ruch (born 8 April 1941) is a Swiss former sports shooter. He competed in the 50 metre rifle three positions event at the 1968 Summer Olympics.
