= Roberto Roxas =

Filipino cyclist

Personal information
- Born: April 15, 1946 (age 80) Rizal, Philippines
- Height: 163 cm (5 ft 4 in)
- Weight: 56 kg (123 lb)

Cycling career
- Sport: Cycling

Roberto Roxas (born April 15, 1946) is a former Filipino cyclist. He competed in the sprint event at the 1968 Summer Olympics.
