= Arturo García (cyclist, born 1946) =

Mexican cyclist

Personal information
- Full name: Arturo García Tapia
- Born: 23 October 1946 (age 79) Mexico City, Mexico
- Height: 5 ft 7 in (170 cm)
- Weight: 66 kg (146 lb)

Cycling career
- Sport: Cycling

Arturo García (born 23 October 1946) is a former Mexican cyclist. He competed in the men's sprint at the 1968 Summer Olympics.
