= Leonel Fernández (sport shooter) =

Guatemalan sports shooter

Personal information
- Born: 14 April 1934 (age 92) Guatemala City, Guatemala

Sport
- Sport: Sports shooting

Leonel Fernández (born 14 April 1934) is a Guatemalan former sports shooter. He competed in the 50 metre rifle three positions event at the 1968 Summer Olympics.
