= Fan Yue-tao =

Taiwanese cyclist

Personal information
- Full name: 范 岳導, Pinyin: Fàn Yuè-dǎo
- Born: 28 October 1949 (age 76) Taoyuan, Taiwan

Cycling career
- Sport: Cycling

Fan Yue-tao (born 28 October 1949) is a former Taiwanese cyclist. He competed in the sprint and the 1000m time trial at the 1968 Summer Olympics.
