= Hilton Clarke (cyclist, born 1944) =

Australian cyclist (born 1944)

Personal information
- Born: 3 September 1944 (age 82) Melbourne, Australia

Cycling career
- Sport: Cycling
Medal record
British Empire Games
Silver medal – second place	1966 Kingston	Men's 10 mile Scratch

Hilton Clarke (born 3 September 1944) is an Australian former cyclist. He competed in the tandem and the 1000m time trial at the 1968 Summer Olympics. He has won 17 Australian titles. Hilton has three sons - Troy, Hilton Jnr. and Jonathan - all of whom have raced at the elite level. He is a member of Carnegie Caulfield Cycling Club.

== Racing career ==
=== Australian Titles ===
1966
1000m Time Trial (Amateur)
4km Team Pursuit (Amateur)

1967
1000m Time Trial (Amateur)
10 mile Scratch Race (Amateur)
4km Team Pursuit (Amateur)

1968
1000m Time Trial (Amateur)
4km Team Pursuit (Amateur)

1969
4km Team Pursuit (Pro)

1970
1 mile Scratch Race (Pro)
5 mile Scratch Race (Pro)

1971
5 mile Scratch Race (Pro)

1972
5 mile Scratch Race (Pro)

1974
1000m Time Trial (Pro)
Madison (Pro)

1975
4km Team Pursuit (Pro)

1976
10km Scratch Race (Pro)
4km Team Pursuit (Pro)
