= Charles Pranke =

American cyclist (1936–1990)

Personal information
- Born: February 8, 1936 Chicago, Illinois, U.S.
- Died: June 8, 1990 (aged 54) Missoula, Montana, U.S.
- Height: 5 ft 7 in (170 cm)
- Weight: 77 kg (170 lb)

Cycling career
- Sport: Cycling

Professional team
- ?: Montrose Cycling Club

Charles Pranke (February 8, 1936 – June 8, 1990) was an American cyclist and bodybuilder. He competed in the men's tandem at the 1968 Summer Olympics.

Pranke died on June 8, 1990, at the age of 54.
