= Carlos Roqueiro =

Argentine cyclist

Personal information
- Born: 23 October 1944 (age 81) Buenos Aires, Argentina

Cycling career
- Sport: Cycling

Carlos Roqueiro (born 23 October 1944) is an Argentine former cyclist. He competed in the sprint event at the 1968 Summer Olympics.
