= Sanji Inoue =

Japanese cyclist (born 1948)

Personal information
- Born: 10 March 1948 (age 78) Tokyo, Japan

Cycling career
- Sport: Cycling

Sanji Inoue (井上 三次, Inoue Sanji; born 10 March 1948) is a Japanese former cyclist. He competed in the sprint and the 1000m time trial at the 1968 Summer Olympics.
