= Slobodan Paunović =

Yugoslav sports shooter

Personal information
- Born: 15 March 1944 (age 82) Bečevica, Yugoslavia

Sport
- Sport: Sports shooting

Slobodan Paunović (born 15 March 1944) is a Yugoslav former sports shooter. He competed in the 50 metre rifle three positions event at the 1968 Summer Olympics.
