= Raul Vazquez (physician) =

Puerto-Rican physician

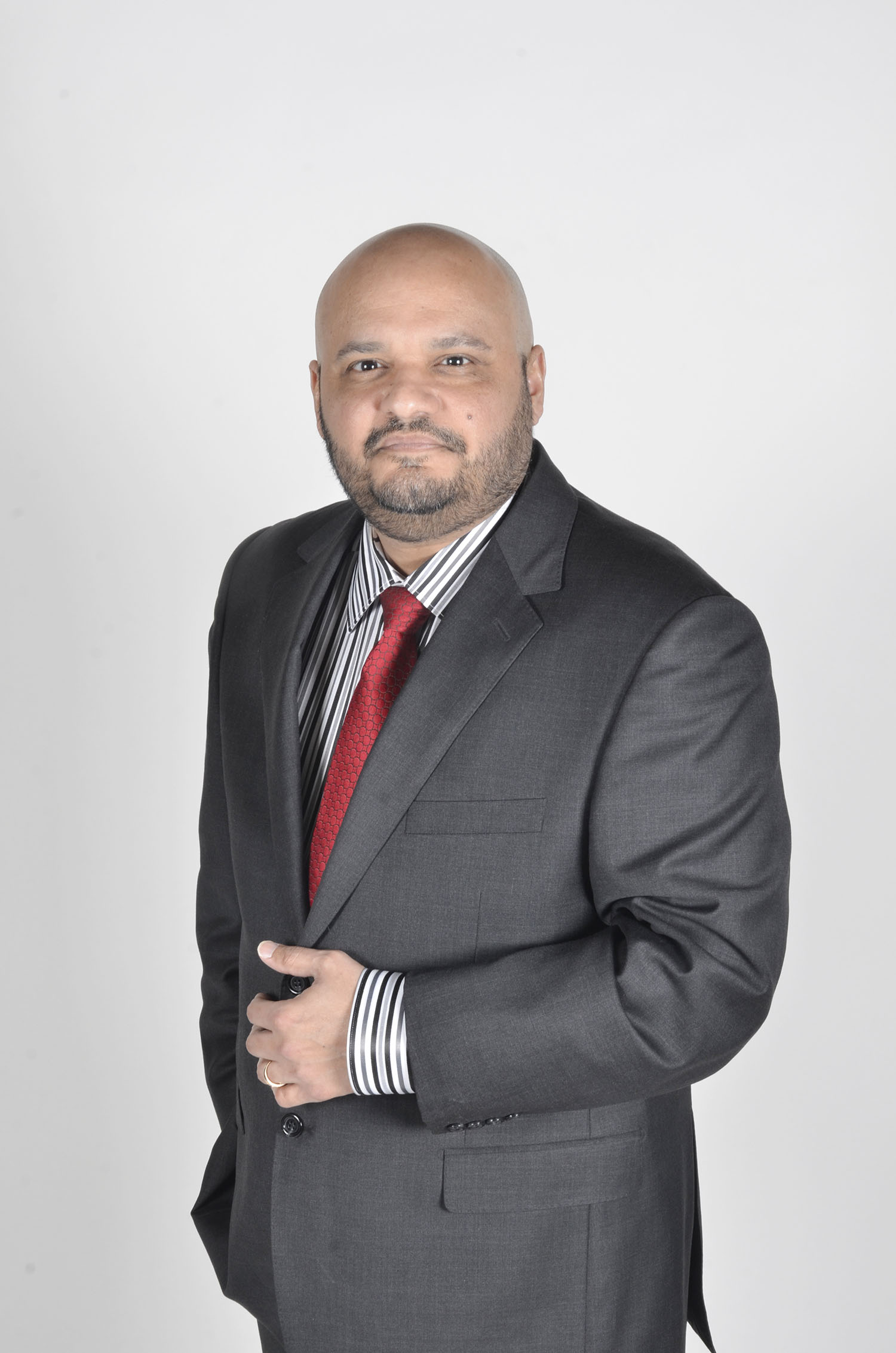
Dr. Raul Vazquez

Raul Vazquez (born January 12, 1963), is a Puerto-Rican primary care physician, philanthropist, the founder and chief executive officer of the Greater Buffalo United Accountable Healthcare Network, and the founder and president of Urban Family Practice P.C. and Westside Urgent Care in Buffalo, New York.

== Early life ==
Vazquez was born in the South Bronx, New York, to a single mother. He was raised with two younger brothers. Vazquez often accompanied his uncle on trips to the local hospital emergency room, and felt distressed because neither the staff nor the physician could understand his uncle's Spanish. From that point, he had aspired to become a doctor, and vowed to alleviate that barrier by becoming a doctor for the misunderstood and underrepresented people.

== Education ==
Vazquez was the first in his family to graduate from high school. After being selected by ten out of eleven medical schools, he attended Fordham University, where he received his undergraduate degree in 1985. In 1989, he obtained his Medical Degree from the State University of New York at Buffalo, where he received a Regents Scholarship. From 1989 to 1992, Vazquez completed a family medicine residency program at Deaconess Hospital and Buffalo General Hospital in Buffalo, New York.

== Career ==
Vazquez is board certified and is a Fellow of the American Academy of Family Physicians. He has held several administrative and staff physician responsibilities at Sheehan Memorial Hospital, Buffalo Columbus Hospital, and Kaleida Health Systems. He also holds an associate clinical professorship from The State University of New York at Buffalo's Department of Family Medicine. He has been linked to pharmaceutical corporations such as Pfizer, GlaxoWellcome, Eli Lilly and Company, and Merck & Co. as a speaker on the use of medications to treat various medical conditions.

On August 5, 1996, Vazquez opened Urban Family Practice P.C., a private family practice. In October 2003, Urban Family Practice moved to a fully computerized medical facility built on the Lower West Side of Buffalo, New York. In 2009, Vazquez founded and currently serves as the president of Westside Urgent Care. In 2012, the New York State Department of Health approved the designation of Urban Family Practice P.C. as a Provider-led Medicaid Health Home, as part of a second phase of health home implementations for the state.

In 2008, he co-founded the Raul and Toni Vazquez Foundation, Inc. to protect and enhance the abilities of non-profit health care organizations to serve society and their individual communities. Through research, public education, and advocacy, the foundation seeks to enhance the performance of non-profit health care organizations in carrying out their unique roles and responsibilities.

In 2009, Vazquez founded and incorporated the Greater Buffalo United Independent Physician Association, later known as the Greater Buffalo United Accountable Healthcare Network or GBUAHN where he currently serves as president and chief executive officer. Both Vazquez's companies employ over 100 people in the Buffalo Metropolitan area. As an advocate for the minority community of Western New York, Vazquez has been overcoming biases against communities of color through the funding of care by both Urban Family Practice P.C. and GBUAHN. GBUAHN became part of the Rite Aid Alliance, a program designed to increase patient compliance with and understanding of doctors' orders, resulting in better health outcomes. GBUAHN is one of Rite Aid's first partners in Buffalo, New York.

In 2016, Vazquez founded the Greater Buffalo United Accountable Care Organization or GBUACO.

On April 4, 2025, the New York Attorney General filed an order to show cause to compel Dr. Vazquez to answer questions under oath involving an investigation into fraudulent Medicaid billing practices. Dr. Vazquez and his Greater Buffalo United Accountable Healthcare Network both were sent an investigatory subpoena on November, 3, 2022. But Dr. Vazquez, according to the attorney general, "willfully and unlawfully" refused to honor the subpoena.

The Medicaid Fraud Control Unit and the NYSAG said they have "strong" evidence that GBUAHN billed Medicaid for services it did not provide, falsified records, enrolled Medicaid members who did not want to be in GBUAHN, and failed to "disenroll" Medicaid members.

in 2014, the Medicaid Fraud Control Unit launched an investigation of GBUAHN regarding compliance with regulations for Healthy Homes, a group of healthcare and service providers who assist Medicaid patients to ensure they attend all appointments and get the appropriate treatment.

== Awards and honors ==
On June 6, 2016, Dr. Vazquez was appointed to the Statewide Multicultural Advisory Committee (SMAC).

On November 21, 2015, Dr. Vazquez and his wife Toni were awarded the Buffalo Urban League Family Life Award

In June 2009, Vazquez was nominated by Governor David Paterson, and approved by the New York State Senate to serve as a member of the NYS Medicaid Advisory Committee. In June 2012, Governor Andrew M. Cuomo nominated, and the NYS Senate approved Vazquez to serve on the Minority Health Council.

Other awards and honors include:

- 2015 Hispanos Unidos de Buffalo "Accepting the Challenge" Award
- 2015 Buffalo 612 C-Level Executive Award (Healthcare)
- 2015 Buffalo Business First Health Care Champions Award
- 2012 Community Leader Award in Healthcare from the National Federation for Just Communities of Western New York.
- The State of New York University at Buffalo Department of Family Medicine Certificate of Appreciation
- City of Buffalo Community Service Award
- Recognition Award from the New York State Association of Black and Puerto Rican Legislators, Inc.
- Hispanic Heritage Month Celebration Hispanic of the Year Award
- Small Business Award from the New York State Assembly
- Medical Sector Small Business of the Year from M&T Bank
- Community Service Award from the Hispanic Women's League
- Hispanic Heritage Award from the Hispanic United of Buffalo
- The Cora P. Mohoney Award from Grassroots Inc.
- Outstanding Community Service Award from Los Tainos
- The National Hispanic Heritage Achievement Award
- The Family Medicine Department of Teaching Award from The State University of New York at Buffalo School of Medicine
- The Health Award from the Hispanic Conference of Western New York
- NAACP's Medgar Evers Award of Distinction -Trailblazer
- Lupus Alliance LEAN Forward Award
- Business First of Buffalo “Who's Who in Health Care”
- Peter Sheehan Diabetes Care Foundation Recognition of Excellence Award
- Awarded 233rd most powerful person in Western New York by Power 250, 2020

== Board membership ==
Vazquez has served on the board of directors for numerous diverse organizations, including:

- Health Care Advisory Panel
- Promesa Inc.
- HEALTHeLINK
- Upstate New York Transplant Services (UNYTS)
- Hispanic United of Buffalo (HUB)
- The Buffalo and Erie County Public Library
- WNED Television
- Bryant & Stratton College

== Mobile application developments ==
A strong advocate of using technological resources to advance healthcare, Vazquez has developed several iPhone and Android Applications.

- Patient-Centered Medical Home (PCMH) Tutor Application
- The Urban Family Practice Application
- The GBUAHN Application
- The GBUACO Application

== Personal life ==
Vazquez lives in suburban Buffalo, New York, with his wife Toni. They have been married since 1994 and have four children, Raul III, Nadia, Nina, and Saul. Vazquez is of Puerto Rican descent, and is fluent in English and Spanish.
