= José Luis Ponce =

Cuban diver

Personal information
- Born: 17 May 1949 (age 75); Mantilla, Cuba

Sport
- Sport: Diving

José Luis Ponce (born 17 May 1949) is a Cuban diver. He competed in two events at the 1968 Summer Olympics.
