= Guillermo Cañete =

Cuban water polo player (born 1949)

Personal information
- Born: 11 July 1949 (age 75); Havana, Cuba

Sport
- Sport: Water polo

Guillermo Cañete (born 11 July 1949) is a Cuban water polo player. He competed at the 1968 Summer Olympics and the 1972 Summer Olympics.
