= Herbert Honz =

German cyclist

Personal information
- Born: 6 September 1942 (age 84) Baden-Württemberg, Germany

Cycling career
- Sport: Cycling

Herbert Honz (born 6 September 1942) is a former German cyclist. He competed in the 1000m time trial at the 1968 Summer Olympics.
