= José María Pigrau =

Spanish sports shooter

Personal information
- Born: 24 September 1942 (age 83) Barcelona, Spain

Sport
- Sport: Sports shooting

José María Pigrau (born 24 September 1942) is a Spanish former sports shooter. He competed at the 1968, 1976 and the 1984 Summer Olympics.
