= Leijn Loevesijn =

Dutch cyclist (born 1949)

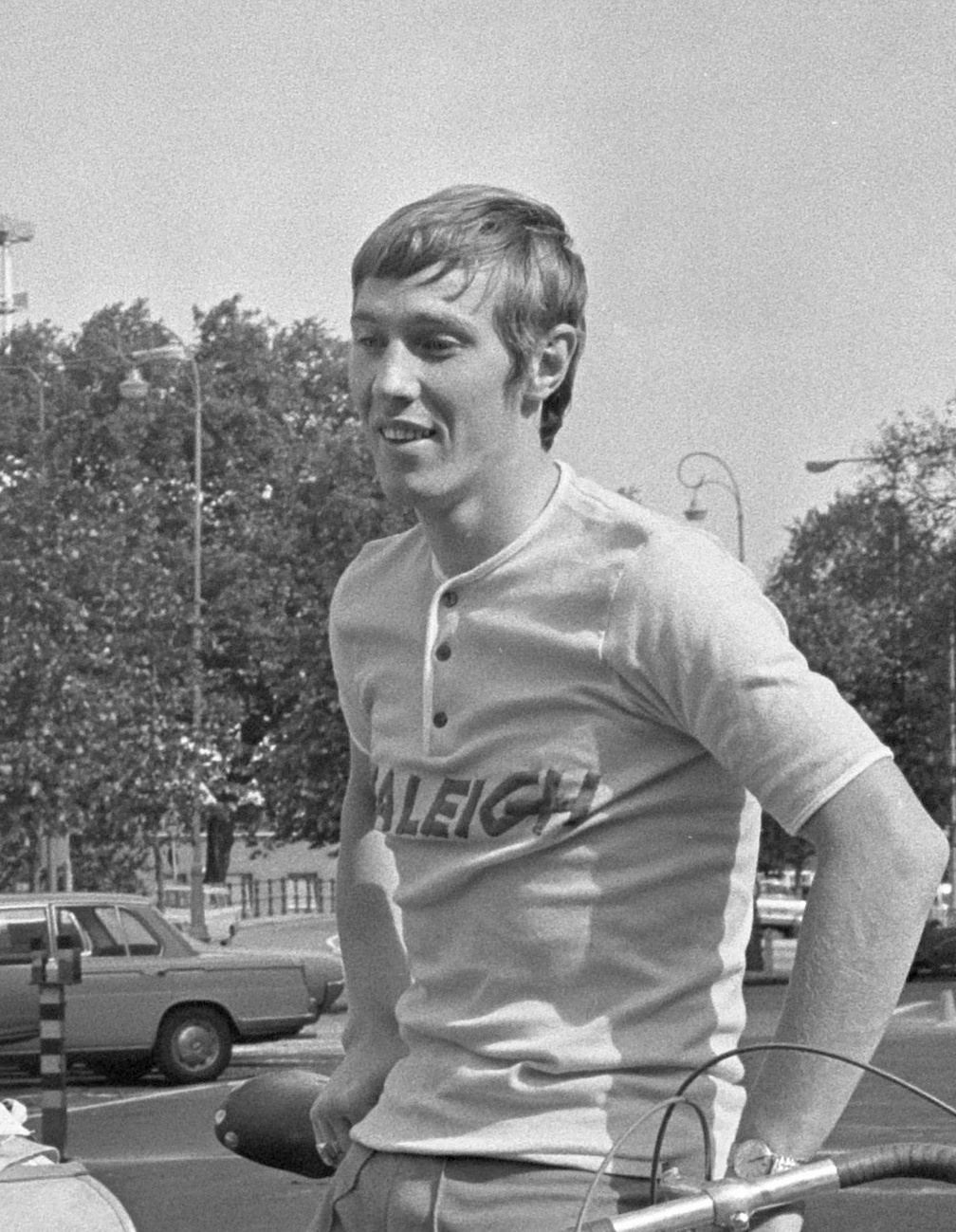
- Leijn Loevesijn in 1971

Personal information
- Born: 2 January 1949 (age 77) Amsterdam, The Netherlands
- Height: 1.76 m (5 ft 9 in)
- Weight: 75 kg (165 lb)

Sport
- Sport: Cycling
- Club: SC Cottbus
Medal record
Olympic Games
Silver medal – second place	1968 Mexico City	Tandem
World championships
Gold medal – first place	1971 Varese	Sprint
Bronze medal – third place	1970 Leicester	Sprint

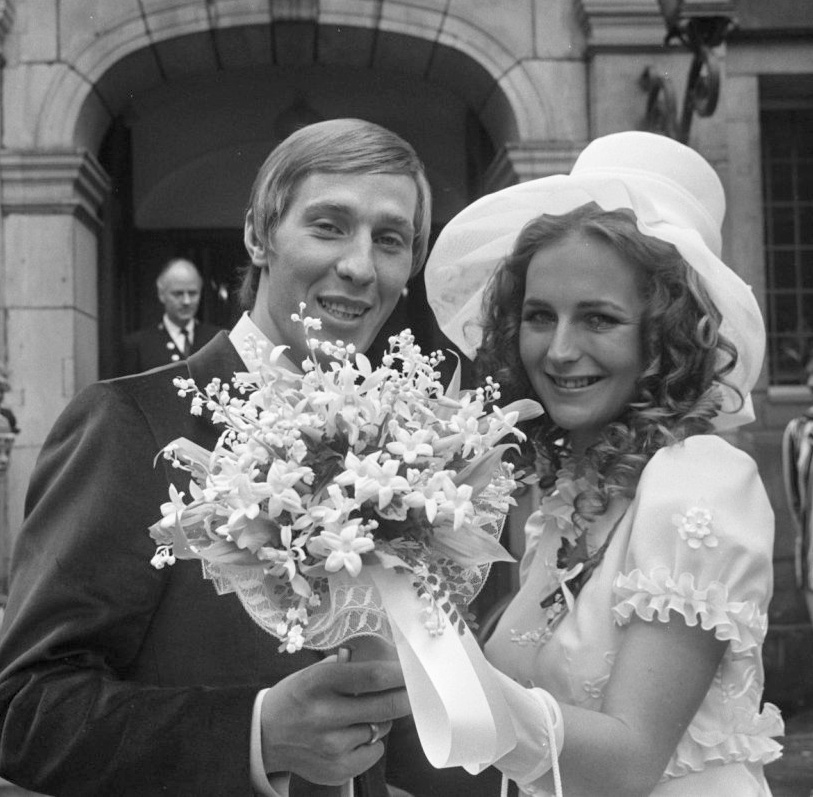
Loevesijn marries Ineke Vink in August 1972

Leijn Loevesijn (born 2 January 1949) is a former Dutch cyclist.

At the 1968 Summer Olympics Loevesijn, together with Jan Jansen won a silver medal in the 2000 metres tandem race, and finished fifth at the sprint race and sixth in the time trial. At the Track Cycling World Championships he won a bronze medal in the sprint in 1970 and a gold medal in the sprint in 1971. Between 1968 and 1976 he won 11 national titles in sprint disciplines.

After that he became a professional. In 1971 he was World Champion Sprint. He was the first Dutch World Champion since Jan Derksen in 1957, and it would take until 2004 before Theo Bos would succeed him. Loevesijn was eight times in a row Dutch Champion sprint en won the "Grote Prijs van Amsterdam" three times.

He ended his career as a professional cyclist in 1976. Afterwards, he tried to combine his cycling activities with his work but in vain. Until his retirement in 2014 Leijn Loevesijn performed as a planning engineer with the water management and sewage services of the city of Amsterdam. Currently he is indirectly involved in cycling.

== Teams ==
- 1969: Batavus - Continental - Alcina
- 1970: Flandria - Mars
- 1971: TI - Carlton
- 1972: Raleigh
- 1973: Raleigh
- 1974: TI - Raleigh
- 1975: G.G.M.C. - Eskagé
- 1976: G.G.M.C. - Eskagé
- 1979: individual

== Victories ==
1968

- NK 1 km timetrial, amateurs
- NK Tandem, amateurs; with Jan Jansen
- 2e in Olympic Games, Tandem; with Jan Jansen

1969

- NK Baan, Sprint, Profs
- NK track race (50 km)

1970

- NK Baan, Sprint, Profs

1971

- NK Baan, Sprint, Profs
- World Champion track, Sprint, Elite

1972

- NK Baan, Sprint, Profs

1973'

- NK Baan, Sprint, Profs

1974

- NK Baan, Sprint, Profs

1975

- NK Baan, Sprint, Profs

1976

- NK Baan, Sprint, Profs

== See also ==
- List of Dutch Olympic cyclists
