= Jørgen Jensen (cyclist) =

Danish cyclist (1947–2015)

Personal information
- Born: 6 January 1947 Odense, Denmark
- Died: 4 March 2015 (aged 68) Odense, Denmark
- Height: 5 ft 9 in (175 cm)
- Weight: 74 kg (163 lb)

Cycling career
- Sport: Cycling

Jørgen Jensen (6 January 1947 – 4 March 2015) was a Danish cyclist. He competed in the men's tandem at the 1968 Summer Olympics. For several years he was the chairman of Odense Ishockey Klub. He died in 2015.
