= Tim Mountford =

American cyclist (1946–2026)

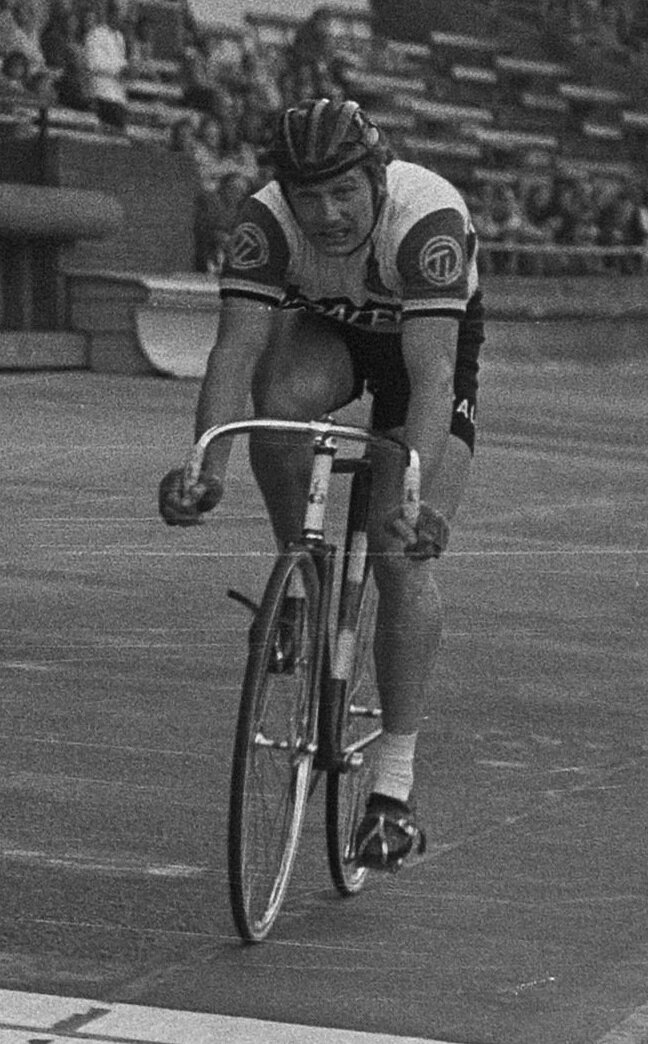
- Mountford in 1972

Personal information
- Full name: Timothy Howard Mountford
- Born: April 2, 1946 Los Angeles, California, U.S.
- Died: June 8, 2026 (aged 80)

Cycling career
- Sport: Cycling

Timothy Howard Mountford (April 2, 1946 – June 8, 2026) was an American cyclist. He competed at the 1964 Summer Olympics and the 1968 Summer Olympics. Mountford died on June 8, 2026, at the age of 80.
