= Luigi Borghetti =

Italian cyclist

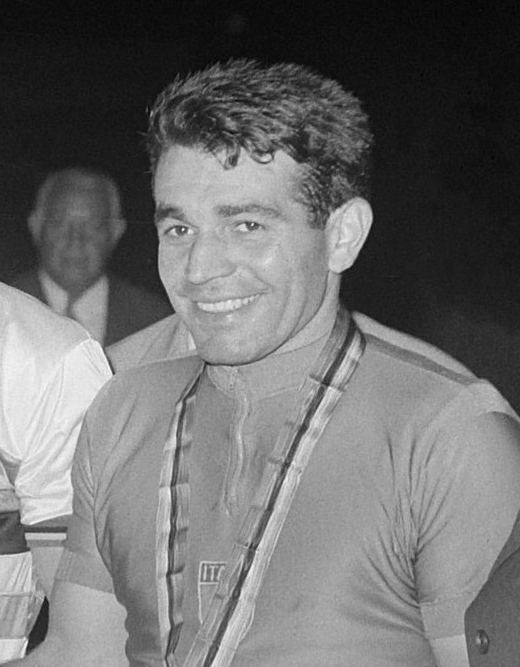
- Luigi Borghetti in 1967

Personal information
- Born: 31 January 1943 (age 83) Rho, Lombardy, Italy
- Height: 1.71 m (5 ft 7 in)
- Weight: 73 kg (161 lb)

Sport
- Sport: Cycling
Medal record
Representing Italy
Track World Championships
Bronze medal – third place	1967 Amsterdam	Sprint
Gold medal – first place	1968 Montevideo	Sprint

Luigi Borghetti (born 31 January 1943) is a retired Italian cyclist who was active between 1967 and 1977. He competed at the 1968 Summer Olympics in the 2 km tandem event and finished in fourth place together with Walter Gorini. The same year he won the world sprint title.
