= Jesús Pérez (water polo) =

Cuban water polo player (born 1948)

Personal information
- Nationality: Cuban
- Born: 8 December 1948 (age 76)

Sport
- Sport: Water polo

Jesús Pérez (born 8 December 1948) is a Cuban water polo player. He competed at the 1968 Summer Olympics, the 1972 Summer Olympics and the 1976 Summer Olympics.
