= Gregorio Fiallo =

Cuban swimmer (born 1952)

Personal information
- Born: 4 February 1952 (age 74) Havana, Cuba

Sport
- Sport: Swimming

Gregorio Fiallo (born 4 February 1952) is a Cuban former swimmer. He competed in three events at the 1968 Summer Olympics.
