= Charumai Mahawat =

Thai sports shooter (born 1934)

Personal information
- Born: 10 March 1934 (age 92) Bangkok, Thailand

Sport
- Sport: Sports shooting

Charumai Mahawat (born 10 March 1934) is a Thai former sports shooter. He competed in the 50 metre rifle three positions event at the 1968 Summer Olympics. He also competed at the 1966 Asian Games and won a bronze medal in team event.
