= José Martínez (Cuban swimmer) =

Cuban swimmer (born 1952)

Personal information
- Born: 7 July 1952 (age 74) Camagüey, Cuba

Sport
- Sport: Swimming

José Martínez (born 7 July 1952) is a Cuban former swimmer. He competed in four events at the 1968 Summer Olympics.
