= Robert Van Lancker =

Belgian cyclist

Robert Vanlancker
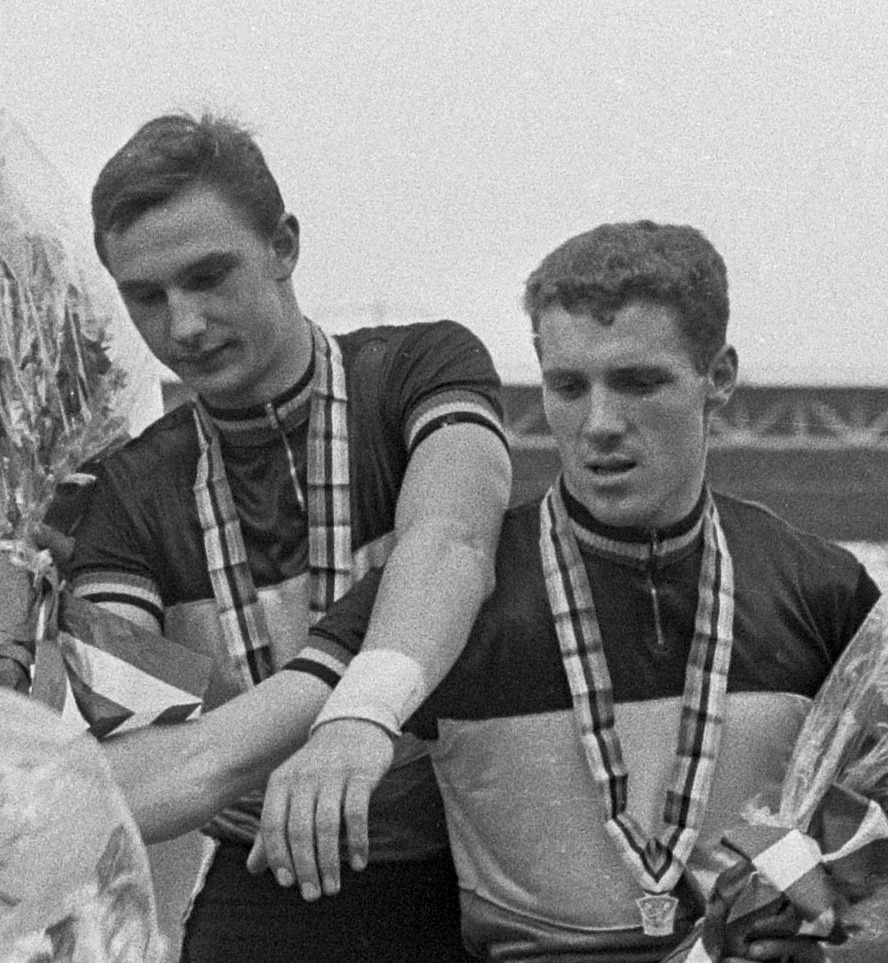
- Daniel Goens and Robert Vanlancker (right) at the 1967 World Championships

Personal information
- Born: 11 December 1946 (age 79) Grâce-Berleur, Liège, Belgium
- Height: 1.73 m (5 ft 8 in)
- Weight: 74 kg (163 lb)

Sport
- Sport: Cycling
Medal record
Representing Belgium
Olympic Games
Bronze medal – third place	1968 Mexico City	Tandem
World Championships
Gold medal – first place	1972 Marseille	Sprint
Gold medal – first place	1973 San Sebastián	Sprint
Silver medal – second place	1968 Rome	Tandem
Silver medal – second place	1969 Antwerp	Sprint
Silver medal – second place	1971 Varese	Sprint
Bronze medal – third place	1967 Amsterdam	Tandem
Bronze medal – third place	1968 Rome	Sprint
Bronze medal – third place	1974 Montreal	Sprint

Robert Vanlancker (born 11 December 1946) is a Belgian track cyclist who mostly competed in sprint and tandem events (together with Daniel Goens), in which he won eight medals at the world championships between 1967 and 1974. At the 1968 Summer Olympics he won a bronze medal in the tandem and failed to reach the final in the individual sprint. Next year he turned professional and competed until 1976.
