= Ulises Váldez =

Cuban cyclist

Personal information
- Born: 14 April 1948 (age 78) Las Villas, Cuba

Cycling career
- Sport: Cycling

Ulises Váldez (born 14 April 1948) is a Cuban former cyclist. He competed in the individual road race and the tandem events at the 1968 Summer Olympics.
