= Jürgen Barth (cyclist) =

German cyclist (1943–2011)

Personal information
- Born: 12 May 1943 Berlin, Germany
- Died: 17 January 2011 (aged 67) Raubling, Germany

Cycling career
- Sport: Cycling

Jürgen Barth (12 May 1943 – 17 January 2011) was a German cyclist. He competed at the 1968 Summer Olympics and the 1972 Summer Olympics.
