= Giordano Turrini =

Italian cyclist (born 1942)

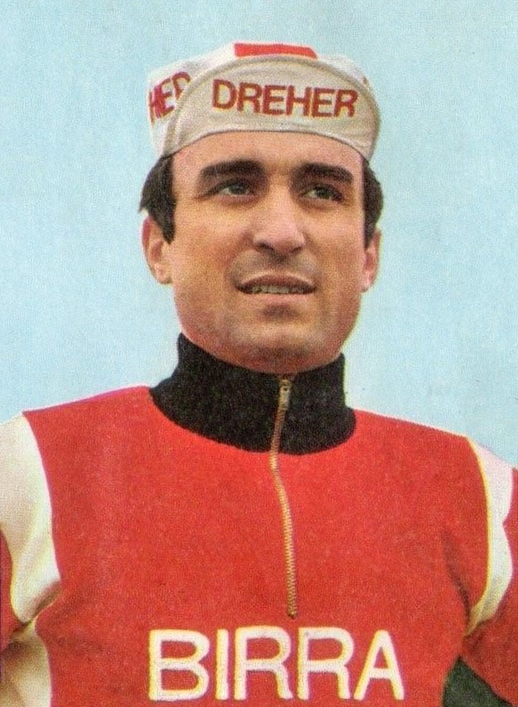
- Turrini in 1971

Personal information
- Full name: Giordano Turrini
- Born: 28 March 1942 (age 84) Anzola dell'Emilia, Italy
- Height: 1.71 m (5 ft 7 in)
- Weight: 72 kg (159 lb)

Cycling career
- Sport: Cycling
- Discipline: Track
- Role: Rider
- Rider type: Sprint

Professional teams
- 1969: Ferretti
- 1970: Sellière-Cima
- 1971–1972: Dreher
- 1973–1977: Brooklyn
- 1978–1979: Sanson
- 1980–1981: Lambrusco-Giacobazzi
- 1981: Zonca
Medal record
Men's track cycling
Representing Italy
Olympic Games
Silver medal – second place	1968 Mexico City	Individual sprint
World championships
Silver medal – second place	1965 San Sebastián	Sprint
Bronze medal – third place	1966 Frankfurt	Tandem
Gold medal – first place	1968 Rome	Tandem
Bronze medal – third place	1971 Varese	Sprint
Bronze medal – third place	1972 Marseille	Sprint
Silver medal – second place	1973 San Sebastián	Sprint
Silver medal – second place	1976 Monteroni di Lecce	Sprint

Giordano Turrini (born 28 March 1942) is a retired Italian track cyclist who won silver medals in the individual sprint at the 1965 World Championships and 1968 Olympics. In 1968 he also won a world title in the tandem, together with Walter Gorini. After that he turned professional and won two bronze and two silver medals in the sprint at world championships. He retired in 1981.
