= Jaroslav Navrátil (sport shooter) =

Czech sport shooter

Personal information
- Born: 1 July 1943 (age 83) Přerov, Protectorate of Bohemia and Moravia

Sport
- Sport: Sport shooting

Jaroslav Navrátil (born 1 July 1943) is a Czech former sport shooter. He competed in the 50 metre rifle three positions event at the 1968 Summer Olympics.
