= José Pittaro =

Argentine cyclist

Personal information
- Born: 23 July 1946 (age 80) San Miguel de Tucumán, Argentina

Cycling career
- Sport: Cycling

José Pittaro (born 23 July 1946) is a former Argentine cyclist. He competed in the sprint and the 1000m time trial at the 1968 Summer Olympics.
