= Jan Jansen (cyclist) =

Dutch track cyclist

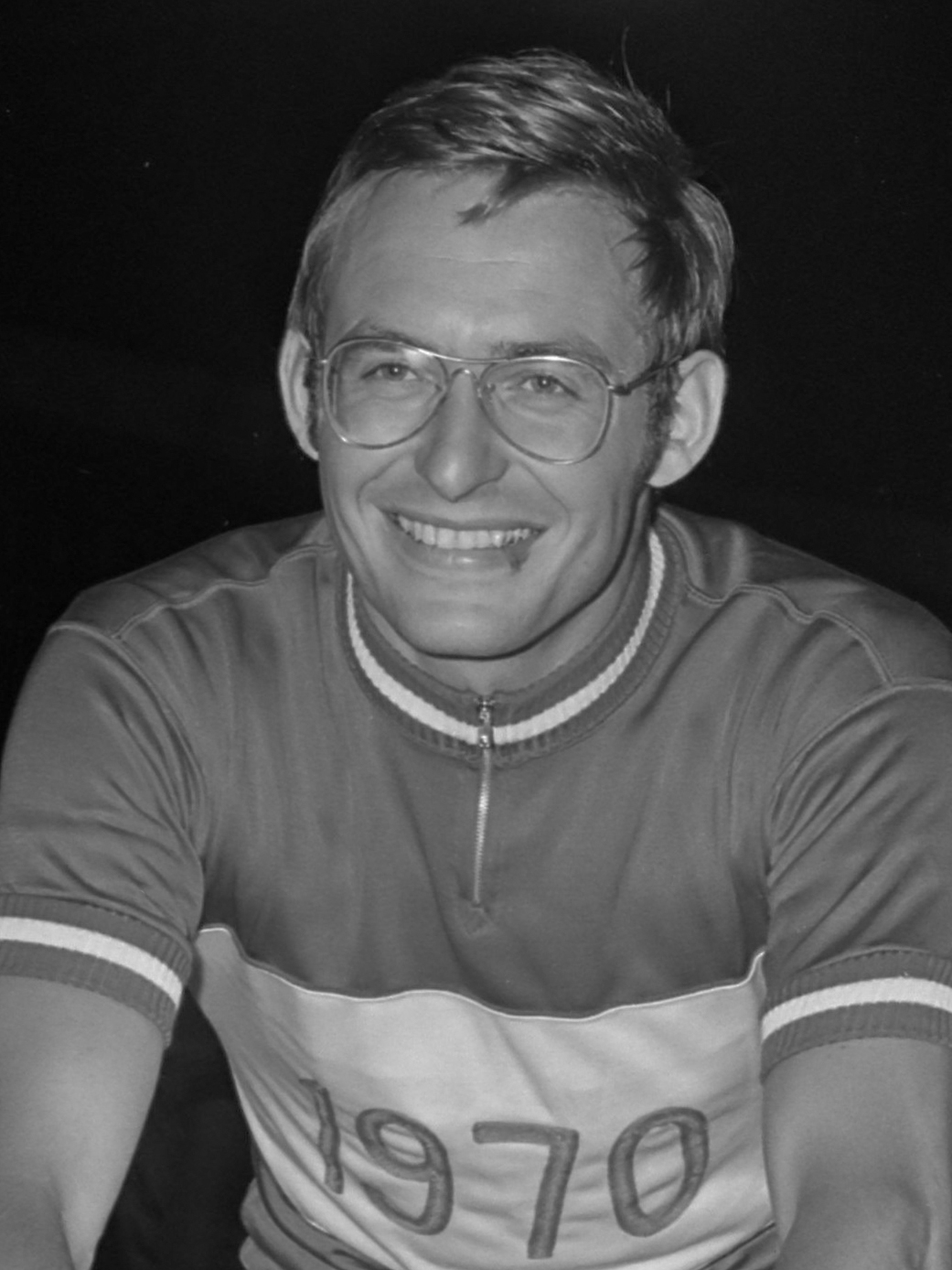
- Jan Jansen (1970)

Personal information
- Born: 26 February 1945 (age 81) Basdorf, Hessen, Germany,

Cycling career
- Sport: Cycling
Medal record
Representing NED
Men's cycling
Olympic Games
Silver medal – second place	1968 Mexico City	Tandem

Johannes Hendrikus "Jan" Jansen (born 26 February 1945) is a former Dutch track cyclist.

He was born in Basdorf. He is a brother of Harrie Jansen. At the 1968 Summer Olympics he won a silver medal in the 2000 metres tandem race, and finished fifth at the sprint race.

== See also ==
- List of Dutch Olympic cyclists
