= Daniel Goens =

Belgian cyclist (born 1948)

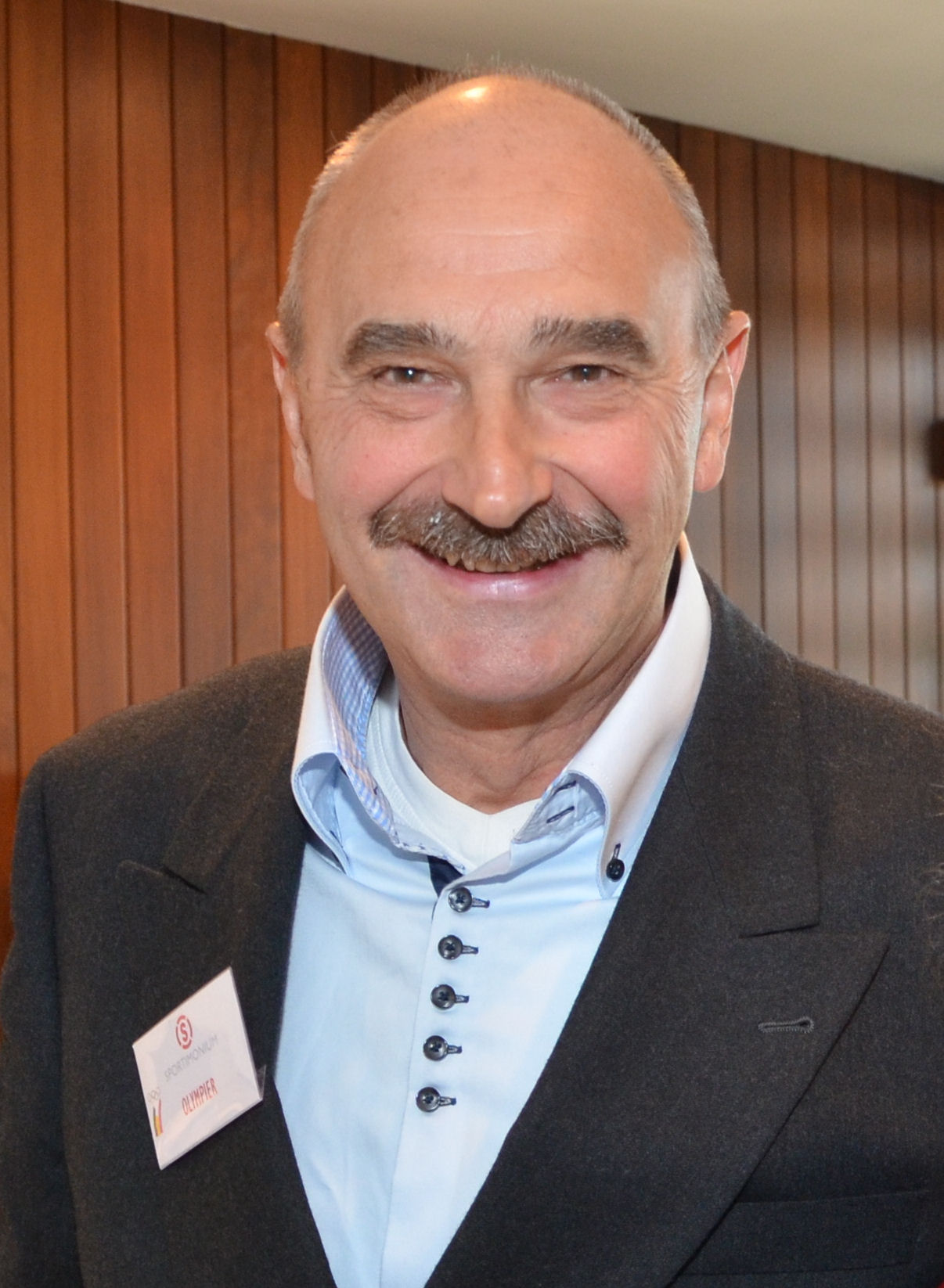
- Daniel Goens in 2012

Personal information
- Born: 15 September 1948 (age 77) Brussels, Belgium
- Height: 1.85 m (6 ft 1 in)
- Weight: 78 kg (172 lb)

Sport
- Sport: Cycling
Medal record
Representing Belgium
Olympic Games
Bronze medal – third place	1968 Mexico City	Tandem
World Championships
Silver medal – second place	1968 Rome	Tandem
Bronze medal – third place	1967 Amsterdam	Tandem

Daniel Goens (born 15 September 1948) is a retired Belgian track cyclist who was most successful in the tandem, together with Robert Van Lancker. In this event, they won bronze medals at the 1968 Summer Olympics and 1967 World Championships, and a silver medal at the 1968 World Championships.
