= Joaquin Tack-Fang =

Cuban fencer

Personal information
- Born: 23 September 1946 (age 79) Guantánamo, Cuba

Sport
- Sport: Fencing

Joaquin Tack-Fang (born 23 September 1946) is a Cuban fencer. He competed in the team sabre event at the 1968 Summer Olympics.
