= Vinich Chareonsiri =

Thai sports shooter

Personal information
- Born: 10 August 1936 (age 89) Prachinburi, Thailand

Sport
- Sport: Sports shooting

Vinich Chareonsiri (born 10 August 1936) is a Thai former sports shooter. He competed in the 50 metre rifle three positions event at the 1968 Summer Olympics.
