= Dino Verzini =

Italian cyclist

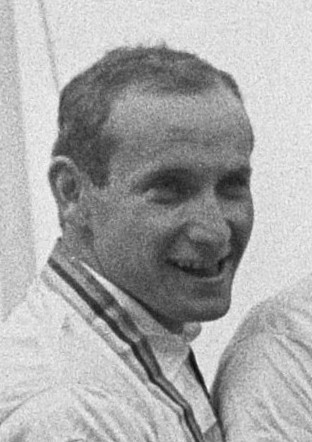
- Dino Verzini at the 1967 World Championships

Personal information
- Born: 26 November 1943 (age 82) Zevio, Italy
- Height: 1.69 m (5 ft 7 in)
- Weight: 69 kg (152 lb)

Sport
- Sport: Cycling
Medal record
Representing Italy
World Championships
Gold medal – first place	1967 Amsterdam	Tandem

Dino Verzini (born 26 November 1943) is a retired Italian track cyclist who specialized in the sprint and tandem events. He was a national sprint champion in 1966 and 1968 and finished fifth at the 1968 Summer Olympics. In 1967 he won the tandem event at the national and World Championships, together with Bruno Gonzato; they also finished second at the 1969 Italian Championships.

After 1969, Verzini changed his tandem partners several times, and at the 1972 Summer Olympics rode with Giorgio Rossi, finishing in ninth place.

After retiring from competitions Verzini founded the company Nuova Tandem, which makes welding and mechanical supplies for lift trucks. Verzini's father, Tullio Verzini, was also a cyclist and competed in the Giro d’Italia in 1926 and 1928–29.
