= Sergio Álvarez (sport shooter) =

Cuban sports shooter

Personal information
- Born: 12 August 1948 (age 77) Havana, Cuba

Sport
- Sport: Sports shooting

Sergio Álvarez (born 12 August 1948) is a Cuban former sports shooter. He competed in the 50 metre rifle three positions event at the 1968 Summer Olympics.
