= Eliseo Vidal =

Cuban swimmer (born 1951)

Personal information
- Born: 19 February 1951 (age 75) Vedado, Cuba

Sport
- Sport: Swimming

Eliseo Vidal (born 19 February 1951) is a Cuban former swimmer. He competed in two events at the 1968 Summer Olympics.
