= Jackie Simes =

American cyclist

Personal information
- Born: November 20, 1942 (age 83) Harrington Park, New Jersey, United States

Cycling career
- Sport: Cycling

Jackie Simes (born November 20, 1942) is an American track cyclist. He competed in the sprint event at the 1960, 1964 and 1968 Summer Olympics, and in the 1968 time trial. He was also the 1964 National Champion and was second in 1961 and 1963.
