= Osvaldo García =

Cuban water polo player (born 1950)

Personal information
- Nationality: Cuban
- Born: 18 December 1950 (age 75)

Sport
- Sport: Water polo

Osvaldo García (born 18 December 1950) is a Cuban water polo player. He competed at the 1968 Summer Olympics, the 1972 Summer Olympics and the 1976 Summer Olympics.
