= Walter Gorini =

Italian cyclist

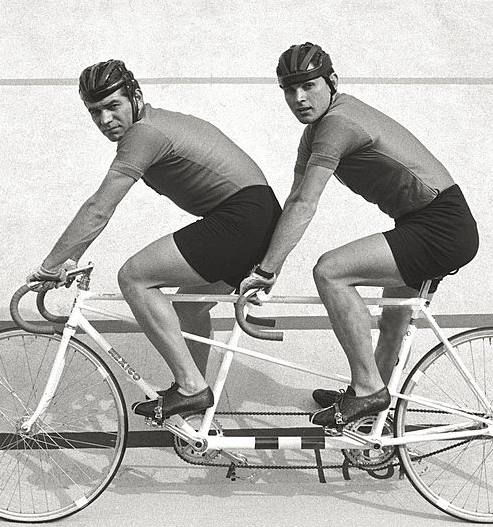
- Luigi Borghetti and Walter Gorini (right) at the 1968 Olympics

Personal information
- Born: 29 August 1944 (age 81) Cotignola, Italy
- Height: 1.72 m (5 ft 8 in)
- Weight: 71 kg (157 lb)

Sport
- Sport: Cycling
Medal record
Representing Italy
Track World Championships
Bronze medal – third place	1966 Frankfurt	Tandem
Gold medal – first place	1968 Rome	Tandem

Walter Gorini (born 29 August 1944) is a retired Italian track cyclist who was active between 1966 and 1967. He won one bronze and one gold medals in the tandem at the world championships of 1966 and 1968, respectively (both with Giordano Turrini); he finished fourth in this event at the 1968 Summer Olympics (with Luigi Borghetti).
