= Juan Reyes (cyclist) =

Personal information
- Born: 16 May 1944 (age 82) Havana, Cuba
- Height: 5 ft 6 in (168 cm)
- Weight: 65 kg (143 lb)

Cycling career
- Sport: Cycling

Juan Reyes (born 16 May 1944) is a former Cuban cyclist. He competed in the men's sprint and the men's tandem events at the 1968 Summer Olympics.
