= José Mercado (cyclist) =

Mexican cyclist (1938–2013)

Personal information
- Full name: José Mercado Escareño
- Born: 1938-05-29 Guadalajara, Mexico
- Died: December 8, 2013 (aged 75)
- Height: 174 cm (5 ft 9 in)
- Weight: 70 kg (154 lb)

Cycling career
- Sport: Cycling

José Mercado Escareño (29 May 1938 – 8 December 2013) was a Mexican cyclist. The Mexican sprint champion for nine straight years in the 1960s and 1970s, he competed at the 1964 Summer Olympics in Tokyo and placed 13th in the 1000m time trial. In 1966, he placed 2nd in both the 1000m and Sprint events at the Central American and Caribbean Sports Games in San Juan, Puerto Rico. At the 1968 Summer Olympics in Mexico City, he placed 21st in the 1000m time trial. He later became a cycling coach in Guadalajara and at the University of Guadalajara.
