= Sergey Kravtsov (cyclist) =

Ukrainian cyclist (born 1948)

Personal information
- Born: 15 February 1948 (age 78) Kharkiv, Ukrainian SSR, Soviet Union
- Height: 1.84 m (6 ft 0 in)
- Weight: 74 kg (163 lb)

Sport
- Sport: Cycling
- Club: Dynamo Kharkiv
Medal record
Representing the Soviet Union
World championships
Silver medal – second place	1971 Varese	Sprint
Silver medal – second place	1974 Montreal	Sprint

Sergey Tarasovich Kravtsov (Russian: Серге́й Тарасович Кравцов; Ukrainian: Сергій Тарасович Кравцов; born 15 February 1948) is a retired Ukrainian cyclist. He competed at the 1968, 1972 and 1976 Summer Olympics in four events in total. His best achievement was fifth place in the sprint in 1976. He won two silver medals in this event at the world championships in 1971 and 1974. In 1974, he also won the Grand Prix de Copenhagen, a major international track competition of those years.
