= John Nicholson (cyclist) =

Australian cyclist (born 1949)

Personal information
- Born: 22 June 1949 (age 77) Melbourne, Australia

Cycling career
- Sport: Cycling
- Current team: Retired
- Discipline: Track
- Role: Rider
- Rider type: Sprinter
Medal record
Representing AUS
Men's cycling
Olympic Games
Silver medal – second place	1972 Munich	Individual sprint
World Championships
Gold medal – first place	1975 Rocourt	Sprint
Gold medal – first place	1976 Monteroni di Lecce	Sprint
Silver medal – second place	1974 Montreal	Sprint
Bronze medal – third place	1977 San Cristóbal	Sprint
Commonwealth Games
Gold medal – first place	1970 Edinburgh	Individual sprint
Gold medal – first place	1974 Christchurch	Individual sprint
Silver medal – second place	1974 Christchurch	Time Trial

John Nicholson (born 22 June 1949) is a former cyclist from Australia.

He competed for Australia in the 1972 Summer Olympics held in Munich, Germany in the individual sprint event where he finished in second place. He also competed at the 1968 Summer Olympics. He won Gold at the 1970 Commonwealth Games and the 1974 Commonwealth Games also in the sprint. He turned professional in 1975 and won the world championships in that year and also in 1976. In 1975 he won the International Champion of Champions sprint at Herne Hill velodrome.

Nicholson was inducted into the Sport Australia Hall of Fame in 1986.

Nicholson is currently (2009) the president and a life member of the Blackburn Cycling Club in Melbourne, Australia.
