= Gordon Johnson (cyclist) =

Australian cyclist

Personal information
- Born: 1 August 1946 (age 80) Essendon, Victoria, Australia

Cycling career
- Sport: Cycling
Medal record
Men's cycling
Representing AUS
Commonwealth Games
Gold medal – first place	1970 Edinburgh	Tandem
Silver medal – second place	1970 Edinburgh	Sprint

Gordon Johnson (born 1 August 1946) is an Australian former cyclist. He competed at the 1964 Summer Olympics and the 1968 Summer Olympics. Despite being an Australian he became the British track champion, winning the British National Individual Sprint Championships in 1971.

Son of Tassy Johnson.
