= Alberto Moreno (diver) =

Cuban diver

Personal information
- Born: 2 May 1950; Havana, Cuba
- Died: 13 September 2016 (aged 66)

Sport
- Sport: Diving

Alberto Moreno (2 May 1950 – 13 September 2016) was a Cuban diver. He competed in two events at the 1968 Summer Olympics.
