= Ivan Kučírek =

Czech cyclist (1946–2022)

Personal information
- Born: 25 November 1946 Břeclav, Czechoslovakia
- Died: 5 February 2022 (aged 75) Břeclav, Czech Republic

Cycling career
- Sport: Cycling

Ivan Kučírek (25 November 1946 – 5 February 2022) was a Czech cyclist. He competed at the 1964, 1968 and 1972 Summer Olympics. His sporting career began with TJ Favorit Brno.

Kučírek died in Břeclav on 5 February 2022, at the age of 75.
