= Pakanit Boriharnvanakhet =

Thai cyclist (born 1949)

Personal information
- Born: 22 July 1949 (age 77) Chiang Mai, Thailand
- Height: 5 ft 8 in (173 cm)
- Weight: 60 kg (130 lb)

Cycling career
- Sport: Cycling

Pakanit Boriharnvanakhet (born 22 July 1949) is a former Thai cyclist. He competed in four events at the 1968 Summer Olympics.
