= Raúl Marcelo Vázquez =

Cuban cyclist

Personal information
- Born: 16 January 1948 (age 78)

Cycling career
- Sport: Cycling

Raúl Marcelo Vázquez (born 16 January 1948) is a Cuban former cyclist. He competed at the 1968, 1972 and the 1976 Summer Olympics.
