= Miloš Jelínek =

Czech cyclist

Personal information
- Born: 10 March 1947 (age 79) Brno, Czechoslovakia
- Height: 5 ft 7 in (170 cm)
- Weight: 73 kg (161 lb)

Cycling career
- Sport: Cycling

Miloš Jelínek (born 10 March 1947) is a former Czech cyclist. He competed in three cycling events at the 1968 Summer Olympics.
