= Fencing at the 1964 Summer Olympics – Men's sabre =

Men's sabre at the Games of the XVIII Olympiad
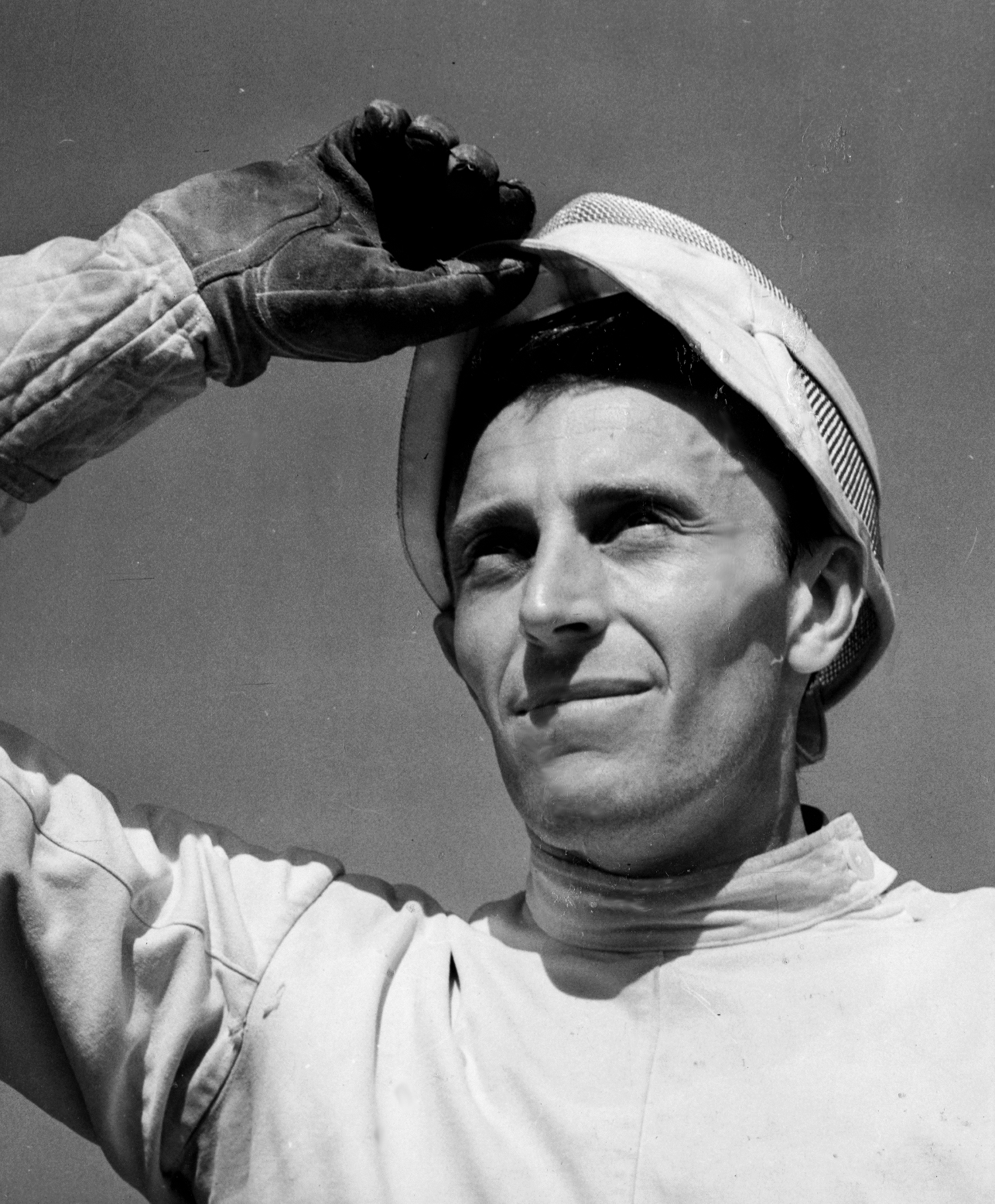
- Tibor Pézsa (1967)
- Venue: Waseda University Memorial Hall
- Dates: October 19–20
- Competitors: 52 from 21 nations

Medalists
1st place, gold medalist(s)		Tibor Pézsa	Hungary
2nd place, silver medalist(s)		Claude Arabo	France
3rd place, bronze medalist(s)		Umyar Mavlikhanov	Soviet Union

The men's sabre was one of eight fencing events on the fencing at the 1964 Summer Olympics programme. It was the fifteenth appearance of the event. The competition was held from October 19 to 20, 1964. 52 fencers from 21 nations competed. Nations had been limited to three fencers each since 1928. The event was won by Tibor Pézsa, the final of nine straight Games in which a Hungarian fencer won the event. The silver medal went to Claude Arabo of France, with Umyar Mavlikhanov of the Soviet Union taking bronze.

== Background ==
This was the 15th appearance of the event, which is the only fencing event to have been held at every Summer Olympics. Four of the eight finalists from 1960 returned: bronze medalist Wladimiro Calarese of Italy, fourth-place finisher Claude Arabo of France, sixth-place finisher (and 1956 silver medalist) Jerzy Pawłowski of Poland (who, in 1968, would finally break the Hungarian run of nine straight gold medals in the event), and eighth-place finisher Yakov Rylsky of the Soviet Union. Rylsky had won three of the last five world championships (1958, 1961, and 1963). Pawłowski was the only other world champion present; he had won in 1957. Hungary, dominant in men's sabre since 1908, was finally thought vulnerable to the rising stars of Poland and the Soviet Union; the French champion, Arabo, was also a strong contender.

Ireland, Iran, Malaysia, and the Netherlands Antilles each made their debut in the men's sabre. Italy made its 13th appearance in the event, most of any nation, having missed the inaugural 1896 event and the 1904 Olympics.

== Competition format ==
The 1964 tournament introduced a hybrid pool-play and knockout format. The competition began with two rounds of pool play. In each round, the fencers were divided into pools to play a round-robin within the pool. Bouts were to five touches. Barrages were used to break ties necessary for advancement. The competition then shifted to knockout rounds. These rounds used a single-elimination tournament format to reduce the remaining field from 24 to 16, then from 16 to 8, then from 8 to 4. There were also classification semifinals and a fifth-place match for the quarterfinal losers. Bouts in these knockout rounds were to 10 touches. The four quarterfinal winners then resumed pool play once again for the final. Standard sabre rules were used.

- Round 1: There were 8 pools of 6 or 7 fencers each. The top 4 fencers in each pool advanced to round 2.
- Round 2: There were 4 pools of 8 fencers each. The top 4 fencers in each pool advanced to the knockout rounds.
- Knockout rounds: The 16 fencers were seeded into a truncated single-elimination tournament. Two knockout rounds were held, finishing with the quarterfinals.
- Classification: There were knockout-style classification matches for 5th place (two 5th–8th semifinals and a 5th/6th match).
- Final: The final pool had 4 fencers.

== Schedule ==
All times are Japan Standard Time (UTC+9)

Date	Time	Round
Monday, 19 October 1964	8:30	Round 1 Round 2
Wednesday, 14 October 1964	17:30; 17:30	Round of 16; Quarterfinals; Classification 5–8; Final

== Results ==
=== Round 1 ===
==== Round 1 pool A ====
Rank	Fencer	Nation	Wins	Losses	Notes
1	Yakov Rylsky	Soviet Union	4	1	Q
2	Pierluigi Chicca	Italy	4	1	Q
3	Ioan Drimba	Romania	3	2	Q
4	Rafael González	Argentina	2	3	B
4	Ignacio Posada	Colombia	2	3	B
6	Michael Ryan	Ireland	0	5	

Barrage A

Rank	Fencer	Nation	Wins	Losses	Notes
4	Ignacio Posada	Colombia	1	0	Q
5	Rafael González	Argentina	0	1	

==== Round 1 pool B ====
Rank	Fencer	Nation	Wins	Losses	Notes
1	Jerzy Pawlowsky	Poland	6	0	Q
2	Eugene Hamori	United States	5	1	Q
3	Cesare Salvadori	Italy	4	2	Q
4	Octavian Vintila	Romania	3	3	Q
5	Jan Boutmy	Netherlands Antilles	2	4	
6	Loc Nguyen The	Vietnam	1	5	
7	Ronnie Theseira	Malaysia	0	6	

==== Round 1 pool C ====
Rank	Fencer	Nation	Wins	Losses	Notes
1	Andrzej Piatkowski	Poland	5	0	Q
2	Wladimiro Calarese	Italy	4	1	Q
3	Thomas Orley	United States	3	2	Q
4	Shibata Seiji	Japan	2	3	Q
5	Robert Foxcroft	Canada	1	5	
6	Houshmand Almasi	Iran	0	6	

==== Round 1 pool D ====
Rank	Fencer	Nation	Wins	Losses	Notes
1	Peter Bakonyi	Hungary	5	0	Q
2	Attila Keresztes	United States	4	1	Q
3	J. Theuerkauff	United Team of Germany	3	2	Q
4	Teruhiro Kitao	Japan	2	3	Q
5	Emilio Echeverri	Colombia	1	5	
6	Nasser Madani	Iran	0	5	

==== Round 1 pool E ====
Rank	Fencer	Nation	Wins	Losses	Notes
1	Mark Rakita	Soviet Union	6	0	Q
2	Jacques Lefevre	France	5	1	Q
3	Funamizu Mitsuyuki	Japan	4	2	Q
4	Dieter Wellman	United Team of Germany	3	3	Q
5	Richard Oldcorn	Great Britain	2	4	
6	Bijan Zarnegar	Iran	1	5	
7	Xuan Tran Van	Vietnam	0	6	

==== Round 1 pool F ====
Rank	Fencer	Nation	Wins	Losses	Notes
1	Marcel Parent	France	5	0	Q
2	Emil Ochyra	Poland	4	1	Q
3	Walter Kostner	United Team of Germany	3	2	Q
4	Alexander Leckie	Great Britain	2	3	Q
5	Henry Sommerville	Australia	1	4	
6	J. Bouchier-Hayes	Ireland	0	5	

==== Round 1 pool G ====
Rank	Fencer	Nation	Wins	Losses	Notes
1	Attila Kovacs	Hungary	6	0	Q
2	Claude Arabo	France	5	1	Q
3	Arnold Cooperman	Great Britain	3	3	Q
4	Yves Brasseur	Belgium	2	4	B
4	Alexander Martonffy	Australia	2	4	B
4	Enrique Penabella	Cuba	2	4	B
7	Juan Frecia	Argentina	1	5	

Barrage G

Rank	Fencer	Nation	Wins	Losses	Notes
4	Enrique Penabella	Cuba	2	0	Q
5	Yves Brasseur	Belgium	0	1	
6	Alexander Martonffy	Australia	0	1	

==== Round 1 pool H ====
Rank	Fencer	Nation	Wins	Losses	Notes
1	Tănase Mureșanu	Romania	6	0	Q
2	Umar Mavlikhanov	Soviet Union	5	1	Q
3	Tibor Pézsa	Hungary	3	3	Q
4	Alberto Lanteri	Argentina	3	3	Q
5	John Andru	Canada	2	4	
6	Les Tornallyay	Australia	1	5	
7	Humberto Posada	Colombia	1	5	

=== Round 2 ===
==== Round 2 pool A ====
Rank	Fencer	Nation	Wins	Losses	Notes
1	Yakov Rylsky	Soviet Union	6	1	Q
2	Dieter Wellman	United Team of Germany	5	2	Q
3	Tibor Pézsa	Hungary	4	3	Q
4	Marcel Parent	France	4	3	Q
5	Wladimiro Calarese	Italy	3	4	
6	Attila Keresztes	United States	3	4	
7	Funamizu Mitsuyuki	Japan	2	5	
8	Octavian Vintila	Romania	1	6	

==== Round 2 pool B ====
Rank	Fencer	Nation	Wins	Losses	Notes
1	Jerzy Pawlowski	Poland	6	1	Q
2	Umar Mavlikhanov	Soviet Union	5	2	Q
3	Attila Kovacs	Hungary	5	2	Q
4	Jacques Lefevre	France	4	3	Q
5	Ioan Drimba	Romania	3	4	
6	Gudrum Theuerkauff	United Team of Germany	3	4	
7	Shibata Seiji	Japan	1	6	
8	Alexander Leckie	Great Britain	1	6	

==== Round 2 pool C ====
Rank	Fencer	Nation	Wins	Losses	Notes
1	Mark Rakita	Soviet Union	7	0	Q
2	Claude Arabo	France	6	1	Q
3	Walter Kostner	United Team of Germany	4	3	Q
4	Pierluigi Chicca	Italy	4	3	Q
5	Thomas Orley	United States	3	4	
6	Andrzej Piatkowski	Poland	3	4	
7	Alberto Lanteri	Argentina	1	6	
8	Ketao Teruhiro	Japan	0	7	

==== Round 2 pool D ====
Rank	Fencer	Nation	Wins	Losses	Notes
1	Emil Ochyra	Poland	7	0	Q
2	Peter Bakonyi	Hungary	5	2	Q
3	Cesare Salvadori	Italy	4	3	Q
4	Tanase Muresan	Romania	4	3	Q
5	Eugene Hamori	United States	3	4	
6	Arnold Cooperman	Great Britain	2	5	
7	Humberto Posada	Colombia	2	5	
8	Enrique Penabella	Cuba	1	6	

=== Knockout rounds ===
The winner of each group advanced to the final pool, while the runner-up moved into a 5th-place semifinal.

==== Group 1 ====
Round of 16
Yakov Rylsky (URS)	10
Jacques Lefevre (FRA)	6
Walter Kostner (EUA)	10
Jerzy Pawlowski (POL)	9

Quarterfinals
Yakov Rylsky (URS)	10
Walter Kostner (EUA)	5

==== Group 2 ====
Round of 16
Tibor Pézsa (HUN)	10
Mark Rakita (URS)	6
Marcel Parent (FRA)	10
Tanase Muresan (ROU)	7

Quarterfinals
Tibor Pézsa (HUN)	10
Marcel Parent (FRA)	7

==== Group 3 ====
Round of 16
Umar Mavlikhanov (URS)	10
Peter Bakonyi (HUN)	9
Emil Ochyra (POL)	10
Cesare Salvadori (ITA)	6

Quarterfinals
Umar Mavlikhanov (URS)	10
Emil Ochyra (POL)	9

==== Group 4 ====
Round of 16
Claude Arabo (FRA)	10
Pierluigi Chicca (ITA)	4
Dieter Wellman (EUA)	10
Attila Kovacs (HUN)	9

Quarterfinals
Claude Arabo (FRA)	10
Dieter Wellman (EUA)	6

=== Fifth place semifinal ===
Fifth place semifinals
Emil Ochyra (POL)	10
Walter Kostner (EUA)	5
Dieter Wellman (EUA)	9
Marcel Parent (FRA)	10

Fifth place match
Emil Ochyra (POL)	10
Marcel Parent (FRA)	5

=== Final ===
Rank	Fencer	Nation	Wins	Losses	Notes
1	Claude Arabo	France	2	1	GB
1	Tibor Pézsa	Hungary	2	1	GB
3	Umar Mavlikhanov	Soviet Union	1	2	BB
3	Yakov Rylsky	Soviet Union	1	2	BB

Bronze medal barrage

Rank	Fencer	Nation	Wins	Losses
3rd place, bronze medalist(s)	Umar Mavlikhanov	Soviet Union	1	0
4	Yakov Rylsky	Soviet Union	0	1

Gold medal barrage

Rank	Fencer	Nation	Wins	Losses
1st place, gold medalist(s)	Tibor Pézsa	Hungary	1	0
2nd place, silver medalist(s)	Claude Arabo	France	0	1

== Sources ==
- Tokyo Organizing Committee (1964). The Games of the XVIII Olympiad: Tokyo 1964, vol. 2.
