= Fencing at the 1964 Summer Olympics – Men's team sabre =

Men's team sabre at the Games of the XVIII Olympiad
- Venue: Waseda Memorial Hall
- Dates: October 22 – 23
- Competitors: 61 from 13 nations

Medalists
1st place, gold medalist(s)		Umyar Mavlikhanov; Mark Rakita; Yakov Rylsky; Boris Melnikov; Nugzar Asatiani	Soviet Union
2nd place, silver medalist(s)		Wladimiro Calarese; Giampaolo Calanchini; Pierluigi Chicca; Mario Ravagnan; Cesare Salvadori	Italy
3rd place, bronze medalist(s)		Jerzy Pawłowski; Ryszard Zub; Andrzej Piątkowski; Emil Ochyra; Wojciech Zabłocki	Poland

The men's team sabre was one of eight fencing events on the fencing at the 1964 Summer Olympics programme. It was the twelfth appearance of the event. The competition was held from October 22 – 23 1964. 61 fencers from 13 nations competed.

== Results ==
=== Round 1 ===
Ties between teams were broken by individual victories (in parentheses), then by touches received.

Pool A
1.	Soviet Union	1-0 (12)	Q2
2.	United States	1-0 (9)	Q2
3.	Japan	0-2 (6)

Pool B
1.	France	2-0 (23)	Q2
2.	Romania	2-0 (19)	Q2
3.	Great Britain	0-2 (8)
4.	Australia	0-2 (5)

Pool C
1.	Italy	1-0 (15)	Q2
2.	Hungary	1-0 (9)	Q2
3.	Argentina	0-2 (3)

Pool D
1.	Poland	2-0 (16)	Q2
2.	United Team of Germany	2-0 (9)	Q2
3.	Iran	0-2 (3)

=== Championship rounds ===
Quarter-finals
Poland	9
United Team of Germany	6
Soviet Union	9
United States	4
France	8
Romania	6
Italy	9
Hungary	7

Semi-finals
Poland	7
Soviet Union	9
France	7
Italy	8

Final
Soviet Union	9
Italy	6
Third place
Poland	8
France	8

==== Fifth place semifinal ====
Fifth place semifinals
Romania	0
Hungary	9
United Team of Germany	9
United States	5

Fifth place match
Hungary	9
United Team of Germany	3

== Rosters ==
Argentina

- Rafael González
- Juan Carlos Frecia
- Julian Velásquez
- Alberto Lanteri

Australia

- Alexander Martonffy
- Les Tornallyay
- Paul Rizzuto
- Brian McCowage
- Henry Sommerville

France

- Jean-Ernest Ramez
- Jacques Lefèvre
- Claude Arabo
- Marcel Parent
- Robert Fraisse

Germany

- Dieter Wellmann
- Klaus Allisat
- Walter Köstner
- Jürgen Theuerkauff
- Percy Borucki

Great Britain

- Richard Oldcorn
- Sandy Leckie
- Ralph Cooperman
- Michael Howard
- Bill Hoskyns

Hungary

- Péter Bakonyi
- Miklós Meszéna
- Attila Kovács
- Zoltán Horváth
- Tibor Pézsa

Iran

- Houshmand Almasi
- Bizhan Zarnegar
- Shahpour Zarnegar
- Nasser Madani

Italy

- Wladimiro Calarese
- Giampaolo Calanchini
- Pierluigi Chicca
- Mario Ravagnan
- Cesare Salvadori

Japan

- Fujio Shimizu
- Teruhiro Kitao
- Seiji Shibata
- Mitsuyuki Funamizu

Poland

- Jerzy Pawłowski
- Ryszard Zub
- Andrzej Piątkowski
- Emil Ochyra
- Wojciech Zabłocki

Romania

- Attila Csipler
- Octavian Vintilă
- Tănase Mureșanu
- Ion Drîmbă

Soviet Union

- Umyar Mavlikhanov
- Mark Rakita
- Yakov Rylsky
- Boris Melnikov
- Nugzar Asatiani

United States

- Alfonso Morales
- Robert Blum
- Gene Hámori
- Attila Keresztes
- Thomas Orley

== Sources ==
- Tokyo Organizing Committee (1964). The Games of the XVIII Olympiad: Tokyo 1964, vol. 2.
