= Fencing at the 1968 Summer Olympics – Men's sabre =

Fencing at the Olympics

Men's sabre at the Games of the XIX Olympiad
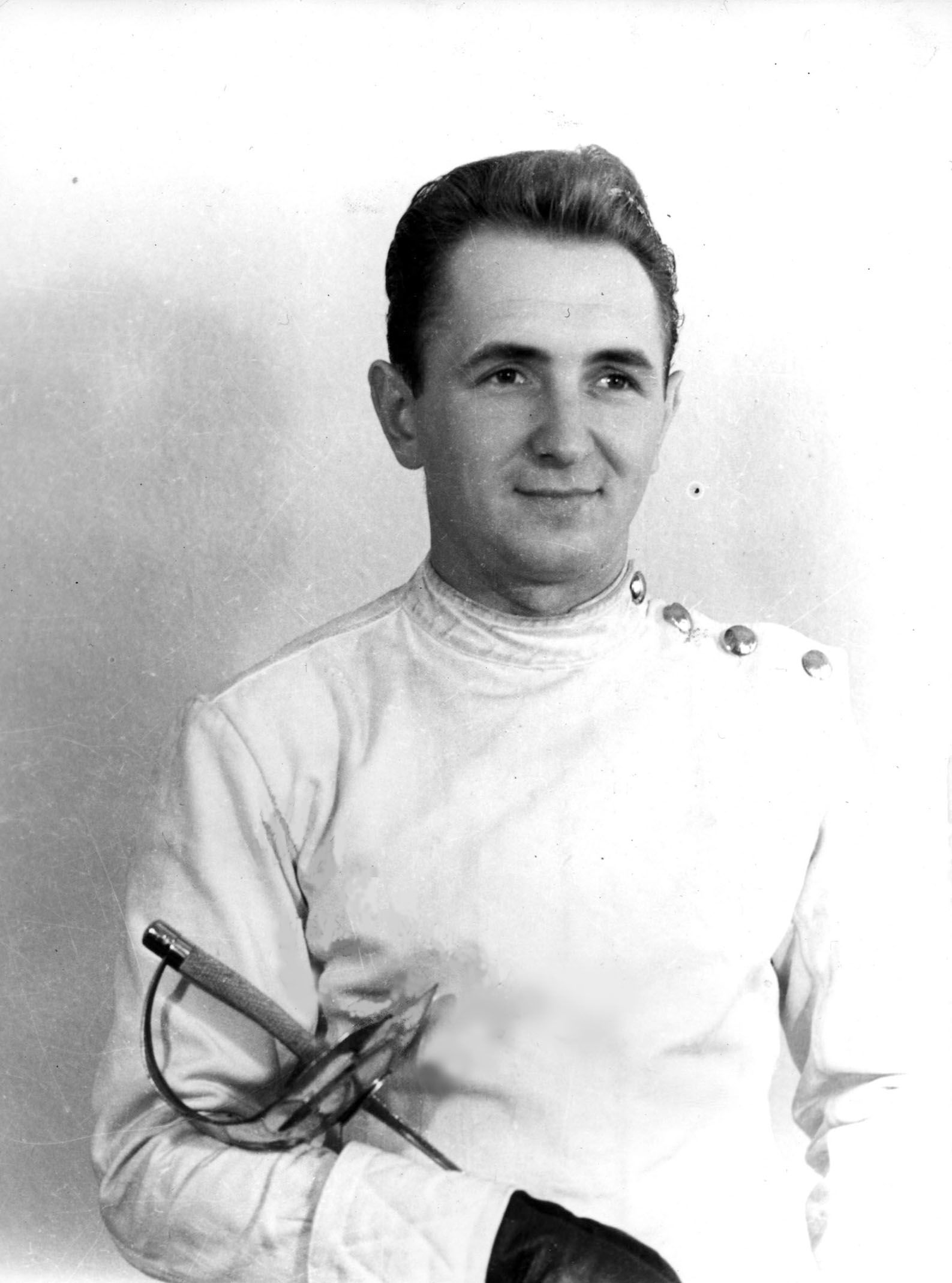
- Jerzy Pawłowski
- Venue: Fernando Montes de Oca Fencing Hall
- Dates: 16–17 October
- Competitors: 40 from 16 nations

Medalists
1st place, gold medalist(s)		Jerzy Pawłowski	Poland
2nd place, silver medalist(s)		Mark Rakita	Soviet Union
3rd place, bronze medalist(s)		Tibor Pézsa	Hungary

The men's sabre was one of eight fencing events on the fencing at the 1968 Summer Olympics programme. It was the sixteenth appearance of the event. The competition was held from 16 to 17 October 1968. 40 fencers from 16 nations competed. Nations had been limited to three fencers each since 1928. The event was won by Jerzy Pawłowski of Poland, breaking a nine-Games string of Hungarian victories in the event. Hungary's best result in the event was Tibor Pézsa's bronze; Pézsa beat Pawłowski in the final pool but the Hungarian lost two other bouts while the Pole was otherwise flawless. Mark Rakita of the Soviet Union lost only to Pawłowski in the final pool, forcing another bout to break the tie between them for gold and silver; that barrage bout was decided by a single point as Pawłowski beat Rakita 5–4.

Pawłowski and Pézsa were the sixth and seventh men to win multiple medals in the individual men's sabre. Pawłowski's gold medal was Poland's first in the event, tying the nation with Cuba, France, Greece, and Italy for second-most all-time, behind Hungary's 11.

== Background ==
This was the 16th appearance of the event, which is the only fencing event to have been held at every Summer Olympics. Six of the eight quarterfinalists from 1964 returned: gold medalist Tibor Pézsa of Hungary, silver medalist Claude Arabo of France, bronze medalist Umar Mavlikhanov of the Soviet Union, fifth-place finisher Emil Ochyra of Poland, sixth-place finisher Marcel Parent of France, and seventh-place finisher Walter Kostner of the United Team of Germany (now competing for West Germany).

The only time that Hungary had competed in the men's sabre event and not won the gold medal was 1900 (Hungarians placed fourth and fifth that Games). Hungary had not competed in the event in 1896 or 1904. Beginning in 1908, the Hungarians were unbeatable. Coming into the 1968 Games, Hungary had won 9 straight gold medals and 11 of the past 12—missing the gold medal only in 1920 when the nation was not invited to the Games following World War I. Pézsa, defending Olympic champion and 1967 world championship bronze medalist, was the nation's strongest hope of keeping that streak alive, but he faced stiff competition. Jerzy Pawłowski of Poland had taken the Olympic bronze medal in 1956, won the world championship in 1957, placed sixth at the 1960 Olympics, finished in the top 16 at the 1964 Olympics, won the world championship again in 1965 and 1966, and finished second in the world championship in 1967. Mark Rakita of the Soviet Union was the reigning world champion, winning over Pawłowski and Pézsa.

West Germany, competing separately for the first time, made its debut in the men's sabre. Italy made its 14th appearance in the event, most of any nation, having missed the inaugural 1896 event and the 1904 St. Louis Games.

== Competition format ==
The 1968 tournament continued to use a mix of pool play and knockout rounds, but with substantial changes from 1964. The first two rounds were round-robin pool play, followed by a knockout round, finishing with another pool for the final. Early-round barrages were eliminated and the knockout round was a modified double elimination round.

- Round 1: 6 pools, with 6 or 7 fencers in each pool. The top 4 fencers in each pool advanced, cutting the field from 40 to 24.
- Round 2: 4 pools, with 6 fencers per pool. Again, the top 4 fencers advanced, reducing the number of remaining fencers from 24 to 16.
- Knockout round: This was a modified double-elimination tournament. The 16 fencers were divided into 4 groups of 4. The winner of the "winners bracket" in each group advanced to the final pool. The winner of the "losers bracket" from each group faced the winner of a different group's "losers bracket," with the winner of that match advancing to the final pool as well. The knockout round winnowed the fencers from 16 to 6.
- Final round: A final pool with the 6 remaining fencers determined the medals and 4th through 6th place. A barrage was used if necessary.

== Schedule ==
All times are Central Standard Time (UTC-6)

Date	Time	Round
Wednesday, 16 October 1968	8:30	Round 1 Round 2
Thursday, 17 October 1968		Knockout rounds Final

== Results ==
=== Round 1 ===
==== Round 1 Pool A ====
Pos	Fencer	W	L	TF	TA	Notes	JP	AM	WK	SP	FD	CO
1	Jerzy Pawłowski (POL)	5	0	25	13	Q		1–0	1–0	1–0	1–0	1–0
2	Alfonso Morales (USA)	4	1	24	14	Q	0–1		1–0	1–0	1–0	1–0
3	Walter Köstner (FRG)	2	3	19	17	Q	0–1	0–1		0–1	1–0	1–0
4	Serge Panizza (FRA)	2	3	18	19	Q	0–1	0–1	1–0		0–1	1–0
5	Félix Delgado (CUB)	1	4	14	23		0–1	0–1	0–1	1–0		0–1
6	Colm O'Brien (IRL)	1	4	10	24		0–1	0–1	0–1	0–1	1–0	

Source: Official Report, vol. 3, p. 644

==== Round 1 Pool B ====
Pos	Fencer	W	L	TF	TA	Notes	UM	CS	MP	VC	RO	AL	JND
1	Umyar Mavlikhanov (URS)	5	1	29	15	Q		0–1	1–0	1–0	1–0	1–0	1–0
2	Cesare Salvadori (ITA)	5	1	28	18	Q	1–0		1–0	1–0	1–0	0–1	1–0
3	Marcel Parent (FRA)	3	3	22	21	Q	0–1	0–1		1–0	0–1	1–0	1–0
4	Vicente Calderón (MEX)	3	3	20	22	Q	0–1	0–1	0–1		1–0	1–0	1–0
5	Richard Oldcorn (GBR)	3	3	24	23		0–1	0–1	1–0	0–1		1–0	1–0
6	Alberto Lanteri (ARG)	2	4	20	25		0–1	1–0	0–1	0–1	0–1		1–0
7	José Narciso Díaz (CUB)	0	6	11	30		0–1	0–1	0–1	0–1	0–1	0–1	

Source: Official Report, vol. 3, p. 644

==== Round 1 Pool C ====
Pos	Fencer	W	L	TF	TA	Notes	CA	TP	PW	JN	JA	JB	JCF
1	Claude Arabo (FRA)	6	0	30	9	Q		1–0	1–0	1–0	1–0	1–0	1–0
2	Tibor Pézsa (HUN)	5	1	26	12	Q	0–1		1–0	1–0	1–0	1–0	1–0
3	Paul Wischeidt (FRG)	4	2	24	20	Q	0–1	0–1		1–0	1–0	1–0	1–0
4	Józef Nowara (POL)	3	3	21	19	Q	0–1	0–1	0–1		1–0	1–0	1–0
5	John Andru (CAN)	2	4	16	24		0–1	0–1	0–1	0–1		1–0	1–0
6	Jan Boutmy (AHO)	1	5	15	29		0–1	0–1	0–1	0–1	0–1		1–0
7	Juan Carlos Frecia (ARG)	0	6	11	30		0–1	0–1	0–1	0–1	0–1	0–1	

Source: Official Report, vol. 3, p. 644

==== Round 1 Pool D ====
Pos	Fencer	W	L	TF	TA	Notes	MR	WC	AO	SL	RQ	WF	NTL
1	Mark Rakita (URS)	6	0	30	11	Q		1–0	1–0	1–0	1–0	1–0	1–0
2	Wladimiro Calarese (ITA)	5	1	29	15	Q	0–1		1–0	1–0	1–0	1–0	1–0
3	Alex Orban (USA)	4	2	25	15	Q	0–1	0–1		1–0	1–0	1–0	1–0
4	Sandy Leckie (GBR)	3	3	23	20	Q	0–1	0–1	0–1		1–0	1–0	1–0
5	Román Quinos (ARG)	2	4	18	22		0–1	0–1	0–1	0–1		1–0	1–0
6	William Fajardo (MEX)	1	5	10	25		0–1	0–1	0–1	0–1	0–1		1–0
7	Nguyễn The Loc (VIE)	0	6	3	30		0–1	0–1	0–1	0–1	0–1	0–1	

Source: Official Report, vol. 3, p. 644

==== Round 1 Pool E ====
Pos	Fencer	W	L	TF	TA	Notes	VN	TK	RC	AK	VD	GC	FF
1	Vladimir Nazlymov (URS)	6	0	30	14	Q		1–0	1–0	1–0	1–0	1–0	1–0
2	Tamás Kovács (HUN)	4	2	25	16	Q	0–1		1–0	1–0	1–0	0–1	1–0
3	Rodney Craig (GBR)	3	3	23	21	Q	0–1	0–1		1–0	0–1	1–0	1–0
4	Anthony Keane (USA)	3	3	21	22	Q	0–1	0–1	0–1		1–0	1–0	1–0
5	Volker Duschner (FRG)	3	3	20	25		0–1	0–1	1–0	0–1		1–0	1–0
6	Gustavo Chapela (MEX)	2	4	20	25		0–1	1–0	0–1	0–1	0–1		1–0
7	Fionbarr Farrell (IRL)	0	6	14	30		0–1	0–1	0–1	0–1	0–1	0–1	

Source: Official Report, vol. 3, p. 644

==== Round 1 Pool F ====
Pos	Fencer	W	L	TF	TA	Notes	PB	EO	RR	YB	MO	JBH
1	Péter Bakonyi (HUN)	4	1	24	9	Q		0–1	1–0	1–0	1–0	1–0
2	Emil Ochyra (POL)	4	1	23	15	Q	1–0		0–1	1–0	1–0	1–0
3	Rolando Rigoli (ITA)	4	1	22	16	Q	0–1	1–0		1–0	1–0	1–0
4	Yves Brasseur (BEL)	2	3	17	19	Q	0–1	0–1	0–1		1–0	1–0
5	Manuel Ortiz (CUB)	1	4	13	22		0–1	0–1	0–1	0–1		1–0
6	John Bouchier-Hayes (IRL)	0	5	7	25		0–1	0–1	0–1	0–1	0–1	

Source: Official Report, vol. 3, p. 644

=== Round 2 ===
==== Round 2 Pool A ====
Pos	Fencer	W	L	TF	TA	Notes	JP	WC	TK	SP	AO	RC
1	Jerzy Pawłowski (POL)	4	1	24	14	Q		0–1	1–0	1–0	1–0	1–0
2	Wladimiro Calarese (ITA)	3	2	21	18	Q	1–0		0–1	0–1	1–0	1–0
3	Tamás Kovács (HUN)	3	2	18	19	Q	0–1	1–0		1–0	0–1	1–0
4	Serge Panizza (FRA)	3	2	23	21	Q	0–1	1–0	0–1		1–0	1–0
5	Alex Orban (USA)	2	3	20	20		0–1	0–1	1–0	0–1		1–0
6	Rodney Craig (GBR)	0	5	11	25		0–1	0–1	0–1	0–1	0–1	

Source: Official Report, vol. 3, p. 644

==== Round 2 Pool B ====
Pos	Fencer	W	L	TF	TA	Notes	TP	MR	MP	RR	EO	VC
1	Tibor Pézsa (HUN)	4	1	23	16	Q		1–0	1–0	0–1	1–0	1–0
2	Mark Rakita (URS)	3	2	23	14	Q	0–1		0–1	1–0	1–0	1–0
3	Marcel Parent (FRA)	3	2	23	16	Q	0–1	1–0		0–1	1–0	1–0
4	Rolando Rigoli (ITA)	3	2	19	18	Q	1–0	0–1	1–0		0–1	1–0
5	Emil Ochyra (POL)	2	3	15	19		0–1	0–1	0–1	1–0		1–0
6	Vicente Calderón (MEX)	0	5	5	25		0–1	0–1	0–1	0–1	0–1	

Source: Official Report, vol. 3, p. 644

==== Round 2 Pool C ====
Pos	Fencer	W	L	TF	TA	Notes	VN	CA	CS	PW	AK	YB
1	Vladimir Nazlymov (URS)	5	0	25	14	Q		1–0	1–0	1–0	1–0	1–0
2	Claude Arabo (FRA)	3	2	21	15	Q	0–1		0–1	1–0	1–0	1–0
3	Cesare Salvadori (ITA)	3	2	21	17	Q	0–1	1–0		0–1	1–0	1–0
4	Paul Wischeidt (FRG)	3	2	22	20	Q	0–1	0–1	1–0		1–0	1–0
5	Anthony Keane (USA)	1	4	14	21		0–1	0–1	0–1	0–1		1–0
6	Yves Brasseur (BEL)	0	5	9	25		0–1	0–1	0–1	0–1	0–1	

Source: Official Report, vol. 3, p. 644

==== Round 2 Pool D ====
Pos	Fencer	W	L	TF	TA	Notes	PB	AM	UM	JN	WK	SL
1	Péter Bakonyi (HUN)	4	1	22	15	Q		1–0	0–1	1–0	1–0	1–0
2	Alfonso Morales (USA)	3	2	21	14	Q	0–1		1–0	0–1	1–0	1–0
3	Umyar Mavlikhanov (URS)	3	2	20	16	Q	1–0	0–1		1–0	0–1	1–0
4	Józef Nowara (POL)	2	3	19	17	Q	0–1	1–0	0–1		0–1	1–0
5	Walter Köstner (FRG)	2	3	15	23		0–1	0–1	1–0	1–0		0–1
6	Sandy Leckie (GBR)	1	4	11	23		0–1	0–1	0–1	0–1	1–0	

Source: Official Report, vol. 3, p. 644

=== Double elimination rounds ===
==== Winners brackets ====
===== Winners group 1 =====
Round of 16		Round of 8
Vladimir Nazlymov (URS)	W
Serge Panizza (FRA)	L	Vladimir Nazlymov (HUN)	W
Alfonso Morales (USA)	W	Alfonso Morales (USA)	L
Wladimiro Calarese (ITA)	L

===== Winners group 2 =====
Round of 16		Round of 8
Tibor Pézsa (HUN)	W
Paul Wischeidt (FRG)	L	Tibor Pézsa (HUN)	W
Marcel Parent (FRA)	L	Mark Rakita (URS)	L
Mark Rakita (URS)	W

===== Winners group 3 =====
Round of 16		Round of 8
Claude Arabo (FRA)	L
Józef Nowara (POL)	W	Józef Nowara (POL)	L
Rolando Rigoli (ITA)	W	Rolando Rigoli (ITA)	W
Péter Bakonyi (HUN)	L

===== Winners group 4 =====
Round of 16		Round of 8
Umyar Mavlikhanov (URS)	W
Cesare Salvadori (ITA)	L	Umyar Mavlikhanov (URS)	L
Tamás Kovács (HUN)	L	Jerzy Pawłowski (POL)	W
Jerzy Pawłowski (POL)	W

==== Losers brackets ====
===== Losers group 1 =====
Round of 4
Serge Panizza (FRA)	W
Wladimiro Calarese (ITA)	L
Paul Wischeidt (FRG)	L
Marcel Parent (FRA)	W

Round of 4
Serge Panizza (FRA)	W
Alfonso Morales (USA)	L
Marcel Parent (FRA)	L
Mark Rakita (URS)	W

Round of 2
Serge Panizza (FRA)	L
Mark Rakita (URS)	W

===== Losers group 2 =====
Round of 4
Claude Arabo (FRA)	W
Péter Bakonyi (HUN)	L
Cesare Salvadori (ITA)	L
Tamás Kovács (HUN)	W

Round of 4
Claude Arabo (FRA)	L
Józef Nowara (POL)	W
Tamás Kovács (HUN)	L
Umyar Mavlikhanov (URS)	W

Round of 2
Józef Nowara (POL)	W
Umyar Mavlikhanov (URS)	L

=== Final round ===
Pos	Fencer	W	L	TF	TA	Notes	JP	MR	TP	VN	RR	JN
1	Jerzy Pawłowski (POL)	4	1	22	18	B		1–0	0–1	1–0	1–0	1–0
1	Mark Rakita (URS)	4	1	24	16	B	0–1		1–0	1–0	1–0	1–0
3rd place, bronze medalist(s)	Tibor Pézsa (HUN)	3	2	20	16		1–0	0–1		0–1	1–0	1–0
4	Vladimir Nazlymov (URS)	3	2	21	17		0–1	0–1	1–0		1–0	1–0
5	Rolando Rigoli (ITA)	1	4	11	21		0–1	0–1	0–1	0–1		1–0
6	Józef Nowara (POL)	0	5	15	25		0–1	0–1	0–1	0–1	0–1	

Source: Official Report, vol. 3, p. 645

Barrage

Pos	Fencer	W	L	TF	TA	JP	MR
1st place, gold medalist(s)	Jerzy Pawłowski (POL)	1	0	5	4		5–4
2nd place, silver medalist(s)	Mark Rakita (URS)	0	1	4	5	4–5	

Source: Official Report, vol. 3, p. 645
