= Fencing at the 1968 Summer Olympics – Men's team sabre =

Men's team sabre at the Games of the XIX Olympiad
- Venue: Fernando Montes de Oca Fencing Hall
- Dates: 20 – 21 October
- Competitors: 56 from 12 nations

Medalists
1st place, gold medalist(s)		Umyar Mavlikhanov; Mark Rakita; Viktor Sidyak; Vladimir Nazlymov; Eduard Vinokurov	Soviet Union
2nd place, silver medalist(s)		Wladimiro Calarese; Rolando Rigoli; Pierluigi Chicca; Michele Maffei; Cesare Salvadori	Italy
3rd place, bronze medalist(s)		Tibor Pézsa; Miklós Meszéna; János Kalmár; Péter Bakonyi; Tamás Kovács	Hungary

The men's team sabre was one of eight fencing events on the fencing at the 1968 Summer Olympics programme. It was the thirteenth appearance of the event. The competition was held from 20 to 21 October 1968. 56 fencers from 12 nations competed.

== Results ==
=== Round 1 ===
Ties between teams were broken by individual victories (in parentheses), then by touches received.

Pool A
1.	Soviet Union	2-0 (24:2)	Q2
2.	Great Britain	1-1 (12:4)	Q2
3.	Mexico	0-2 (6:26)

Pool B
1.	Hungary	2-0 (29:3)	Q2
2.	West Germany	1-1 (17:15)	Q2
3.	Ireland	0-2 (2:30)

Pool C
1.	Italy	2-0 (24:3)	Q2
2.	United States	1-1 (13:14)	Q2
3.	Argentina	0-2 (6:26)

Pool D
1.	France	2-0 (22:10)	Q2
2.	Poland	1-1 (20:12)	Q2
3.	Cuba	0-2 (6:26)

=== Championship rounds ===
Quarter-finals
Soviet Union	9
Great Britain	1
France	9
Poland	2
Italy	8
United States	6
Hungary	9
West Germany	4

Semi-finals
Soviet Union	9
France	4
Italy	9
Hungary	6

Final
Soviet Union	9
Italy	7
Third place
Hungary	9
France	5

==== Fifth place semifinal ====
Fifth place semifinals
Poland	9
Great Britain	2
United States	9
West Germany	7

Fifth place match
Poland	9
United States	5

== Rosters ==
Argentina

- Román Quinos
- Juan Carlos Frecia
- Guillermo Saucedo
- Alberto Lanteri

Cuba

- Manuel Ortiz
- José Narciso Díaz
- Joaquin Tack-Fang
- Félix Delgado

France

- Marcel Parent
- Claude Arabo
- Bernard Vallée
- Serge Panizza
- Jean-Ernest Ramez

Great Britain

- Sandy Leckie
- Rodney Craig
- David Acfield
- Richard Oldcorn

Hungary

- Tibor Pézsa
- Miklós Meszéna
- János Kalmár
- Péter Bakonyi
- Tamás Kovács

Ireland

- Colm O'Brien
- Fionbarr Farrell
- Michael Ryan
- John Bouchier-Hayes

Italy

- Wladimiro Calarese
- Rolando Rigoli
- Pierluigi Chicca
- Michele Maffei
- Cesare Salvadori

Mexico

- William Fajardo
- Gustavo Chapela
- Héctor Abaunza
- Vicente Calderón
- Román Gómez

Poland

- Jerzy Pawłowski
- Józef Nowara
- Franciszek Sobczak
- Zygmunt Kawecki
- Emil Ochyra

Soviet Union

- Umyar Mavlikhanov
- Mark Rakita
- Viktor Sidyak
- Vladimir Nazlymov
- Eduard Vinokurov

United States

- Alex Orban
- Alfonso Morales
- Anthony Keane
- Robert Blum
- Thomas Balla

West Germany

- Percy Borucki
- Walter Köstner
- Paul Wischeidt
- Klaus Allisat
- Volker Duschner
