= Iran at the 1964 Summer Olympics =

- IOC code: IRI (IRN used at these Games)
- NOC: National Olympic Committee of Iran

in Tokyo, Japan
- Competitors: 63 in 10 sports
- Flag bearer: Nosratollah Shahmir
- Medals Ranked 34th: Gold 0 Silver 0 Bronze 2 Total 2

Summer Olympics appearances (overview)
- 1900; 1904–1936; 1948; 1952; 1956; 1960; 1964; 1968; 1972; 1976; 1980–1984; 1988; 1992; 1996; 2000; 2004; 2008; 2012; 2016; 2020; 2024; 2028

Iran competed at the 1964 Summer Olympics in Tokyo, Japan. 63 athletes represented Iran in the 1964 Olympics.

== Competitors ==
Sport	Men	Women	Total
Aquatics, Diving	1		1
Aquatics, Swimming	1		1
Athletics	5	3	8
Boxing	5		5
Cycling, Road	4		4
Fencing	4		4
Football	17		17
Gymnastics, Artistic	1	1	2
Shooting	4		4
Weightlifting	5		5
Wrestling	12		12
Total	59	4	63

== Medal summary ==
=== Medal table ===
Sport	Gold	Silver	Bronze	Total
Wrestling			2	2
Total	0	0	2	2

=== Medalists ===
Medal	Name	Sport	Event
Bronze	Ali Akbar Heidari	Wrestling	Men's freestyle 52 kg
Bronze	Mohammad Ali Sanatkaran	Wrestling	Men's freestyle 78 kg

== Results by event ==
=== Aquatics ===
==== Diving ====
Men

Athlete	Event	Preliminary		Final		
Athlete	Event	Score	Rank	Score	Total	Rank
Manouchehr Fasihi	3 m springboard	67.20	26	Did not advance		

==== Swimming ====
Men

Athlete	Event	Heats		Semifinals		Final	
Athlete	Event	Time	Rank	Time	Rank	Time	Rank
Heidar Shonjani	100 m freestyle	1:02.1	66	Did not advance			

=== Athletics ===
Men

Athlete	Event	1st round			2nd round			Semifinal			Final		Rank
Athlete	Event	Heat	Time	Rank	Heat	Time	Rank	Heat	Time	Rank	Time	Rank	Rank
Akbar Babakhanloo	100 m	6	11.1	8	Did not advance								63
Abdolvahab Shahkhoreh	200 m	5	22.3	7	Did not advance								48
Hossein Ghafourizadeh	400 m	7	50.8	8	Did not advance								50
Ebrahim Yazdanpanah	800 m	1	1:54.7	6				Did not advance					39
Ebrahim Yazdanpanah	1500 m	2	3:54.8	8				Did not advance					34
Ebrahim Yazdanpanah	5000 m	2	Did not start								Did not advance		—

Athlete	Event	Qualification round		Final	
Athlete	Event	Result	Rank	Result	Rank
Jalal Keshmiri	Discus throw	45.24	27	Did not advance	

Women

Athlete	Event	1st round			2nd round			Semifinal			Final		Rank
Athlete	Event	Heat	Time	Rank	Heat	Time	Rank	Heat	Time	Rank	Time	Rank	Rank
Simin Safamehr	100 m	2	13.2	7	Did not advance								43

Athlete	Event	Qualification round		Final	
Athlete	Event	Result	Rank	Result	Rank
Nazli Bayat Makoo	High jump	No mark		Did not advance	
Simin Safamehr	Long jump	5.06	31	Did not advance	
Juliet Geverkof	Shot put	9.17	16	Did not advance	
Juliet Geverkof	Discus throw	30.05	21	Did not advance	

=== Boxing ===
Men

Athlete	Event	Round of 64	Round of 32	Round of 16	Quarterfinal	Semifinal	Final	Rank
Nasser Aghaei	51 kg		Choh (KOR); L Disqualification	Did not advance				17
Sadegh Aliakbarzadeh	54 kg		Fabila (MEX); L 2–3	Did not advance				17
Hassan Pakandam	60 kg	Bye	Pilichev (BUL); L RSC	Did not advance				17
Keramat Nadimi	63.5 kg	Bye	Gopalan (MAS); W RSC	da Silva (BRA); L 2–3	Did not advance			9
Mahmoud Mahmoudpour	67 kg		Hamada (JPN); L 0–5	Did not advance				17

=== Cycling ===
==== Road ====
Men

Athlete	Event	Time	Rank
Davoud Akhlaghi	Road race	Did not finish	
Mashallah Aminsorour	Road race	−1 lap	72
Esmaeil Hosseini	Road race	−1 lap	78
Akbar Poudeh	Road race	−1 lap	80
Davoud Akhlaghi; Mashallah Aminsorour; Esmaeil Hosseini; Akbar Poudeh	Team time trial	2:43:39.16	22

=== Fencing ===
Men

Athlete	Event	1st round		2nd round		3rd round	4th round	Quarterfinal	Final	Rank
Athlete	Event	Pools	Rank	Pools	Rank	3rd round	4th round	Quarterfinal	Final	Rank
Houshmand Almasi	Individual épée	Pellegrino (ITA); L 1–5	Pool E 9	Did not advance						65
Houshmand Almasi	Individual épée	Bar (SUI); L 1–5	Pool E 9	Did not advance						65
Houshmand Almasi	Individual épée	Vergara (CHI); L 1–5	Pool E 9	Did not advance						65
Houshmand Almasi	Individual épée	Hecke (EUA); L 4–5	Pool E 9	Did not advance						65
Houshmand Almasi	Individual épée	Bourquard (FRA); L 2–5	Pool E 9	Did not advance						65
Houshmand Almasi	Individual épée	Tamayo (COL); L 3–5	Pool E 9	Did not advance						65
Houshmand Almasi	Individual épée	Abrahamsson (SWE); L 3–5	Pool E 9	Did not advance						65
Houshmand Almasi	Individual épée	Han (KOR); W 5–4	Pool E 9	Did not advance						65
Houshmand Almasi	Individual foil	Granieri (ITA); L 0–5	Pool E 6	Did not advance						46
Houshmand Almasi	Individual foil	Tabuchi (JPN); L 3–5	Pool E 6	Did not advance						46
Houshmand Almasi	Individual foil	Revenu (FRA); L 1–5	Pool E 6	Did not advance						46
Houshmand Almasi	Individual foil	Abdelrahman (EGY); L 1–5	Pool E 6	Did not advance						46
Houshmand Almasi	Individual foil	Andru (CAN); L 4–5	Pool E 6	Did not advance						46
Houshmand Almasi	Individual sabre	Shibata (JPN); L 2–5	Pool C 6	Did not advance			Did not advance			41
Houshmand Almasi	Individual sabre	Piątkowski (POL); L 0–5	Pool C 6	Did not advance			Did not advance			41
Houshmand Almasi	Individual sabre	Orley (USA); L 1–5	Pool C 6	Did not advance			Did not advance			41
Houshmand Almasi	Individual sabre	Foxcroft (CAN); L 3–5	Pool C 6	Did not advance			Did not advance			41
Houshmand Almasi	Individual sabre	Calarese (ITA); L 2–5	Pool C 6	Did not advance			Did not advance			41
Bijan Zarnegar	Individual épée	Jacobs (GBR); L 3–5	Pool C 8	Did not advance						57
Bijan Zarnegar	Individual épée	Nielaba (POL); L 0–5	Pool C 8	Did not advance						57
Bijan Zarnegar	Individual épée	Serp (ARG); L 1–5	Pool C 8	Did not advance						57
Bijan Zarnegar	Individual épée	Kostava (URS); L 0–5	Pool C 8	Did not advance						57
Bijan Zarnegar	Individual épée	Lindwall (SWE); L 1–5	Pool C 8	Did not advance						57
Bijan Zarnegar	Individual épée	Gemayel (LIB); L 3–5	Pool C 8	Did not advance						57
Bijan Zarnegar	Individual épée	Bouchier (IRL); L 2–5	Pool C 8	Did not advance						57
Bijan Zarnegar	Individual foil	Courtillat (FRA); L 0–5	Pool F 6	Did not advance						46
Bijan Zarnegar	Individual foil	Hoskyns (GBR); L 2–5	Pool F 6	Did not advance						46
Bijan Zarnegar	Individual foil	Nannini (ARG); L 1–5	Pool F 6	Did not advance						46
Bijan Zarnegar	Individual foil	Ryan (IRL); L 4–5	Pool F 6	Did not advance						46
Bijan Zarnegar	Individual foil	Drîmbă (ROU); L 1–5	Pool F 6	Did not advance						46
Bijan Zarnegar	Individual sabre	Lefèvre (FRA); L 1–5	Pool E 6	Did not advance			Did not advance			41
Bijan Zarnegar	Individual sabre	Tran (VIE); W 5–2	Pool E 6	Did not advance			Did not advance			41
Bijan Zarnegar	Individual sabre	Oldcorn (GBR); L 1–5	Pool E 6	Did not advance			Did not advance			41
Bijan Zarnegar	Individual sabre	Funamizu (JPN); L 2–5	Pool E 6	Did not advance			Did not advance			41
Bijan Zarnegar	Individual sabre	Rakita (URS); L 1–5	Pool E 6	Did not advance			Did not advance			41
Bijan Zarnegar	Individual sabre	Wellmann (EUA); L 1–5	Pool E 6	Did not advance			Did not advance			41
Shahpour Zarnegar	Individual épée	Saccaro (ITA); L 1–5	Pool D 8	Did not advance						57
Shahpour Zarnegar	Individual épée	Trost (AUT); L 1–5	Pool D 8	Did not advance						57
Shahpour Zarnegar	Individual épée	Gonsior (POL); L 2–5	Pool D 8	Did not advance						57
Shahpour Zarnegar	Individual épée	Haukler (ROU); L 4–5	Pool D 8	Did not advance						57
Shahpour Zarnegar	Individual épée	Anger (USA); L 2–5	Pool D 8	Did not advance						57
Shahpour Zarnegar	Individual épée	Andru (CAN); L 4–5	Pool D 8	Did not advance						57
Shahpour Zarnegar	Individual épée	Saykali (LIB); L 0–5	Pool D 8	Did not advance						57
Nasser Madani	Individual foil	Echeverri (COL); W 5–3	Pool D 4 Q	Szabó (HUN); L 2–5	Pool E 4 Q	Drîmbă (ROU); L 4–10	Did not advance			17
Nasser Madani	Individual foil	Brecht (EUA); L 2–5	Pool D 4 Q	Axelrod (USA); L 2–5, W 5–3 B	Pool E 4 Q	Drîmbă (ROU); L 4–10	Did not advance			17
Nasser Madani	Individual foil	Szabó (HUN); L 3–5	Pool D 4 Q	Parulski (POL); L 2–5	Pool E 4 Q	Drîmbă (ROU); L 4–10	Did not advance			17
Nasser Madani	Individual foil	Midler (URS); L 2–5	Pool D 4 Q	Jay (GBR); W 5–3, W 5–4 B	Pool E 4 Q	Drîmbă (ROU); L 4–10	Did not advance			17
Nasser Madani	Individual foil	Foxcroft (CAN); W 5–0	Pool D 4 Q	Courtillat (FRA); W 5–3, L 0–5 B	Pool E 4 Q	Drîmbă (ROU); L 4–10	Did not advance			17
Nasser Madani	Individual sabre	Keresztes (USA); L 0–5	Pool D 6	Did not advance			Did not advance			41
Nasser Madani	Individual sabre	Kitao (JPN); L 3–5	Pool D 6	Did not advance			Did not advance			41
Nasser Madani	Individual sabre	Theuerkauff (EUA); L 1–5	Pool D 6	Did not advance			Did not advance			41
Nasser Madani	Individual sabre	Echeverri (COL); L 3–5	Pool D 6	Did not advance			Did not advance			41
Nasser Madani	Individual sabre	Bakonyi (HUN); L 3–5	Pool D 6	Did not advance			Did not advance			41

Athlete	Event	1st round		2nd round	Quarterfinal	Semifinal	Final	Rank
Athlete	Event	Pools	Rank	2nd round	Quarterfinal	Semifinal	Final	Rank
Houshmand Almasi; Nasser Madani; Bijan Zarnegar; Shahpour Zarnegar	Team épée	Italy; L 0–16	Pool C 4	Did not advance				11
Houshmand Almasi; Nasser Madani; Bijan Zarnegar; Shahpour Zarnegar	Team épée	Hungary; L 1–14	Pool C 4	Did not advance				11
Houshmand Almasi; Nasser Madani; Bijan Zarnegar; Shahpour Zarnegar	Team foil	Soviet Union; L 0–10	Pool D 3		Did not advance			9
Houshmand Almasi; Nasser Madani; Bijan Zarnegar; Shahpour Zarnegar	Team foil	United Team of Germany; L 2–14	Pool D 3		Did not advance			9
Houshmand Almasi; Nasser Madani; Bijan Zarnegar; Shahpour Zarnegar	Team sabre	United Team of Germany; L 3–9	Pool D 3		Did not advance			9
Houshmand Almasi; Nasser Madani; Bijan Zarnegar; Shahpour Zarnegar	Team sabre	Poland; L 0–16	Pool D 3		Did not advance			9

=== Football ===
Men

Squad list	First round		Quarterfinal	Semifinal	Final	Rank
Squad list	Group A	Rank	Quarterfinal	Semifinal	Final	Rank
Aziz Asli; Mansour Amirasefi; Ali Mirzaei; Mostafa Arab; Hassan Habibi; Ebrahim Latifi; Abdollah Saedi; Kambozia Jamali; Jalal Talebi; Gholam Hossein Nourian; Hossein Khodaparast; Karam Nayyerloo; Gholam Hossein Fanaei; Fariborz Esmaeili; Dariush Mostafavi; Parviz Ghelichkhani; Mohammad Bayati; Coach: Hossein Fekri	Germany; L 0–4	4	Did not advance			13
Aziz Asli; Mansour Amirasefi; Ali Mirzaei; Mostafa Arab; Hassan Habibi; Ebrahim Latifi; Abdollah Saedi; Kambozia Jamali; Jalal Talebi; Gholam Hossein Nourian; Hossein Khodaparast; Karam Nayyerloo; Gholam Hossein Fanaei; Fariborz Esmaeili; Dariush Mostafavi; Parviz Ghelichkhani; Mohammad Bayati; Coach: Hossein Fekri	Mexico; D 1–1	4	Did not advance			13
Aziz Asli; Mansour Amirasefi; Ali Mirzaei; Mostafa Arab; Hassan Habibi; Ebrahim Latifi; Abdollah Saedi; Kambozia Jamali; Jalal Talebi; Gholam Hossein Nourian; Hossein Khodaparast; Karam Nayyerloo; Gholam Hossein Fanaei; Fariborz Esmaeili; Dariush Mostafavi; Parviz Ghelichkhani; Mohammad Bayati; Coach: Hossein Fekri	Romania; L 0–1	4	Did not advance			13

=== Gymnastics ===
Men

Athlete	Event	FX	PH	SR	VT	PB	HB	Total	Rank
Jalal Bazargan	Individual all-around	14.95	15.15	15.80	18.35	16.85	15.25	96.35	118

Athlete	Event	Qualification				Final		
Athlete	Event	Compulsory	Optional	Total	Rank	Score	Total	Rank
Jalal Bazargan	Floor	7.45	7.50	14.95	123	Did not advance		
Jalal Bazargan	Pommel horse	7.55	7.60	15.15	113	Did not advance		
Jalal Bazargan	Rings	7.30	8.50	15.80	116	Did not advance		
Jalal Bazargan	Vault	9.05	9.30	18.35	103	Did not advance		
Jalal Bazargan	Parallel bars	8.15	8.70	16.85	116	Did not advance		
Jalal Bazargan	Horizontal bar	7.80	7.45	15.25	116	Did not advance		

Women

Athlete	Event	VT	UB	BB	FX	Total	Rank
Jamileh Sorouri	Individual all-around	12.666	8.000	15.233	14.033	49.932	82

Athlete	Event	Qualification				Final		
Athlete	Event	Compulsory	Optional	Total	Rank	Score	Total	Rank
Jamileh Sorouri	Vault	5.733	6.933	12.666	81	Did not advance		
Jamileh Sorouri	Uneven bars	3.000	5.000	8.000	82	Did not advance		
Jamileh Sorouri	Balance beam	7.233	8.000	15.233	81	Did not advance		
Jamileh Sorouri	Floor	6.500	7.533	14.033	83	Did not advance		

=== Shooting ===
Men

Athlete	Event	Score	Rank
Nosratollah Momtahen	25 m rapid fire pistol	Did not start	
Nosratollah Momtahen	50 m pistol	490	52
Mohammad Jafar Kalani	50 m rifle 3 positions	Did not start	
Mohammad Jafar Kalani	50 m rifle prone	576	64
Nasser Sharifi	50 m rifle 3 positions	1018	53
Gholam Hossein Mobasser	50 m rifle prone	579	61

=== Weightlifting ===
Men

Athlete	Event	Press	Snatch	Clean & Jerk	Total	Rank
Mohammad Nassiri	56 kg	105.0	85.0	120.0	310.0	15
Ali Rajabi Eslami	56 kg	100.0	100.0	130.0	330.0	10
Parviz Jalayer	67.5 kg	120.0	120.0	155.0	395.0	7
Reza Esteki	82.5 kg	120.0	132.5	167.5	420.0	12
Manouchehr Boroumand	+90 kg	155.0	140.0	170.0	465.0	12

=== Wrestling ===
Men's freestyle

Athlete	Event	1st round	2nd round	3rd round	4th round	5th round	Final round	Rank
Ali Akbar Heidari	52 kg	Din (PAK); D Points	Liang (MAS); W Fall	Zafiropoulos (GRE); W Points	Simons (USA); D Points	Yanılmaz (TUR); W Points	Did not advance	3rd place, bronze medalist(s)
Abdollah Khodabandeh	57 kg	Georgiev (BUL); D Points	Anwary (AFG); W Points	Akbaş (TUR); L Points	Did not advance			9
Ebrahim Seifpour	63 kg	Jutila (CAN); L Fall	Meehan (NZL); W Fall	Yoon (KOR); W Fall	Tovar (MEX); W Points	Khokhashvili (URS); L Points	Did not advance	6
Abdollah Movahed	70 kg	Stephenson (GBR); W Points	Marsh (AUS); W Points	Chung (KOR); W Points	Horiuchi (JPN); D Points	Valchev (BUL); D Points	Did not advance	5
Mohammad Ali Sanatkaran	78 kg	Heinze (EUA); W Points	Watanabe (JPN); W Points	Bajkó (HUN); W Points	Afzal (PAK); W DSQP	Dermendzhiev (BUL); W Points	Sagaradze (URS); D Points	3rd place, bronze medalist(s)
Mohammad Ali Sanatkaran	78 kg	Heinze (EUA); W Points	Watanabe (JPN); W Points	Bajkó (HUN); W Points	Afzal (PAK); W DSQP	Dermendzhiev (BUL); W Points	Ogan (TUR); D Points	3rd place, bronze medalist(s)
Mansour Mehdizadeh	87 kg	Hollósi (HUN); W Points	Brand (USA); D Points	Kobelt (SUI); W Points	Güngör (TUR); W Points	Gardzhev (BUL); W Points	Did not advance	4
Gholamreza Takhti	97 kg	Vígh (HUN); W Points	Buck (GBR); W Fall	Mane (IND); W Fall	Ayık (TUR); L Points	Mustafov (BUL); D Points	Did not advance	4

Men's Greco-Roman

Athlete	Event	1st round	2nd round	3rd round	4th round	5th round	Final round	Rank
Ahmad Khoshouei	52 kg	Mewis (BEL); L Points	Bozkurt (TUR); L Points	Did not advance			Did not advance	12
Siavash Shafizadeh	57 kg	Knitter (POL); L Points	Švec (TCH); L Fall	Did not advance				15
Rasoul Mirmalek	63 kg	Mansour (EGY); W Points	Olsson (SWE); D Points	Bolocan (ROU); D Points	Ballery (FRA); W Points	Did not advance		6
Hossein Mollaghasemi	70 kg	Burke (USA); D Points	Tapio (FIN); L Fall	Did not advance				14
Asghar Zoghian	78 kg	Bye	Shin (KOR); W Points	Schiermeyer (FRA); L Points	Țăranu (ROU); L Points	Did not advance		7
