= Fencing at the 1964 Summer Olympics =

Fencing at the Games of the XVIII Olympiad

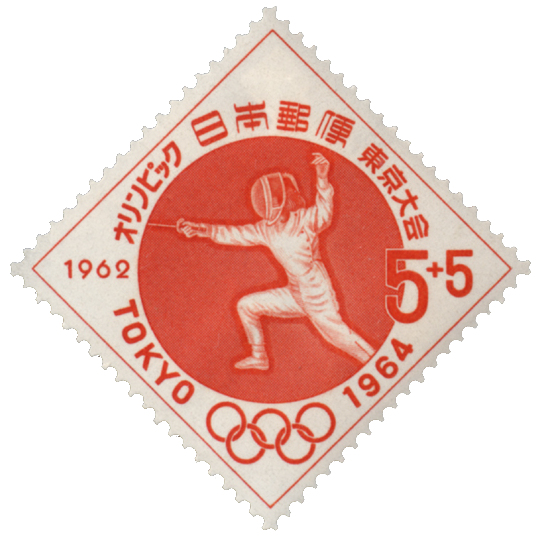
Fencing at the 1964 Olympics on a stamp of Japan

At the 1964 Summer Olympics in Tokyo, eight events in fencing were contested. Men competed in both individual and team events for each of the three weapon types (épée, foil and sabre), but women competed only in foil events.

== Medal summary ==
=== Men's events ===
Games	Gold	Silver	Bronze
Individual épée	Grigory Kriss; Soviet Union	Henry Hoskyns; Great Britain	Guram Kostava; Soviet Union
Team épée	Hungary; Árpád Bárány; Tamás Gábor; István Kausz; Győző Kulcsár; Zoltán Nemere	Italy; Giovan Battista Breda; Giuseppe Delfino; Gianfranco Paolucci; Alberto Pellegrino; Gianluigi Saccaro	France; Claude Bourquard; Claude Brodin; Jacques Brodin; Yves Dreyfus; Jack Guittet
Individual foil	Egon Franke; Poland	Jean Claude Magnan; France	Daniel Revenu; France
Team foil	Soviet Union; Viktor Zhdanovich; Yuri Sharov; Yuri Sisikin; German Sveshnikov; Mark Midler	Poland; Witold Woyda; Zbigniew Skrudlik; Ryszard Parulski; Egon Franke; Janusz Rozycki	France; Jacky Courtillat; Jean-Claude Magnan; Christian Noël; Daniel Revenu; Pierre Rodocanachi
Individual sabre	Tibor Pézsa; Hungary	Claude Arabo; France	Umar Mavlikhanov; Soviet Union
Team sabre	Soviet Union; Boris Melnikov; Nugzar Asatiani; Mark Rakita; Yakov Rylsky; Umar Mavlikhanov	Italy; Giampaolo Calanchini; Wladimiro Calarese; Pier-Luigi Chicca; Mario Ravagnan; Cesare Salvadori	Poland; Emil Ochyra; Jerzy Pawłowski; Ryszard Zub; Andrzej Piatkowski; Wojciech Zabłocki

=== Women's events ===
Games	Gold	Silver	Bronze
Individual foil	Ildikó Újlaky-Rejtő; Hungary	Helga Mees; United Team of Germany	Antonella Ragno; Italy
Team foil	Hungary; Paula Marosi; Katalin Juhász; Judit Ágoston; Lídia Dömölky; Ildikó Újlaky-Rejtő	Soviet Union; Lyudmila Shishova; Valentina Prudskova; Valentina Rastvorova; Tatyana Samusenko; Galina Gorokhova	United Team of Germany; Heidi Schmid; Helga Mees; Rosemarie Scherberger; Gudrun Theuerkauff

== Medal table ==
Rank	Nation	Gold	Silver	Bronze	Total
1	Hungary	4	0	0	4
2	Soviet Union	3	1	2	6
3	Poland	1	1	1	3
4	France	0	2	3	5
5	Italy	0	2	1	3
6	United Team of Germany	0	1	1	2
7	Great Britain	0	1	0	1
Totals (7 entries)		8	8	8	24

== Participating nations ==
A total of 259 fencers (203 men and 56 women) from 30 nations competed at the Tokyo Games:

- Argentina (11)
- Australia (18)
- Austria (5)
- Belgium (2)
- Canada (3)
- Chile (3)
- Colombia (5)
- Cuba (2)
- Egypt (5)
- France (20)
- United Team of Germany (19)
- Great Britain (13)
- Hungary (20)
- Iran (4)
- Ireland (2)
- Italy (20)
- Japan (15)
- Lebanon (4)
- Luxembourg (2)
- Malaysia (1)
- Netherlands Antilles (1)
- Northern Rhodesia (1)
- Poland (15)
- Romania (11)
- South Korea (5)
- Soviet Union (20)
- Sweden (7)
- Switzerland (5)
- United States (18)
- Vietnam (2)

== Sources ==
- Tokyo Organizing Committee (1964). The Games of the XVIII Olympiad: Tokyo 1964, vol. 2.
