= France at the 1964 Summer Olympics =

- IOC code: FRA
- NOC: French Olympic Committee

in Tokyo
- Competitors: 138 in 14 sports
- Flag bearer: Michel Macquet
- Medals Ranked 21st: Gold 1 Silver 8 Bronze 6 Total 15

Summer Olympics appearances (overview)
- 1896; 1900; ~~1904~~; 1908; 1912; 1920; 1924; 1928; 1932; 1936; 1948; 1952; 1956; 1960; 1964; 1968; 1972; 1976; 1980; 1984; 1988; 1992; 1996; 2000; 2004; 2008; 2012; 2016; 2020; 2024; 2028

Other related appearances
- 1906 Intercalated Games

France competed at the 1964 Summer Olympics in Tokyo, Japan. 138 competitors, 118 men and 20 women, took part in 89 events in 14 sports.

== Medalists ==
=== Gold ===
- Pierre Jonquères d'Oriola — Equestrian, Jumping Individual Competition

=== Silver ===
- Maryvonne Dupureur — Athletics, Women's 800 metres
- Joseph Gonzales — Boxing, Men's Light Middleweight
- Jean Boudehen and Michel Chapuis — Canoeing, Men's C2 1000 m Canadian Pairs
- Pierre Jonquères d'Oriola, Janou Lefebvre, and Guy Lefrant — Equestrian, Jumping Team Competition
- Jean-Claude Magnan — Fencing, Men's Foil Individual
- Claude Arabo — Fencing, Men's Sabre Individual
- Jean-Claude Darouy, Georges Morel, and Jacques Morel — Rowing, Men's Coxed Pairs
- Kiki Caron — Swimming, Women's 100 m Backstroke

=== Bronze ===
- Paul Genevay, Bernard Laidebeur, Claude Piquemal, and Jocelyn Delecour — Athletics, Men's 4×100 metres Relay
- Daniel Morelon — Cycling, Men's 1000 m Sprint (Scratch)
- Pierre Trentin — Cycling, Men's 1000 m Time Trial
- Daniel Revenu — Fencing, Men's Foil Individual
- Jacky Courtillat, Jean-Claude Magnan, Christian Noël, Daniel Revenu, and Pierre Rodocanachi — Fencing, Men's Foil Team
- Claude Bourquard, Claude Brodin, Jacques Brodin, Yves Dreyfus, and Jack Guittet — Fencing, Men's Épée Team

== Athletics ==
Men's 4×100 metres Relay

- Paul Genevay, Bernard Laidebeur, Claude Piquemal, and Jocelyn Delecour → Bronze Medal

== Cycling ==
14 cyclists represented France in 1964.

Individual road race

- Francis Bazire
- Lucien Aimar
- Bernard Guyot
- Christian Raymond

Team time trial

- Marcel-Ernest Bidault
- Georges Chappe
- André Desvages
- Jean-Claude Wuillemin

Sprint

- Daniel Morelon
- Pierre Trentin

1000m time trial

- Pierre Trentin

Tandem

- Daniel Morelon
- Pierre Trentin

Individual pursuit

- Robert Varga

Team pursuit

- Robert Varga
- Christian Cuch
- Joseph Pare
- Jacques Suire

== Fencing ==
20 fencers, 15 men and 5 women, represented France in 1964.

Men's foil

- Jean-Claude Magnan
- Daniel Revenu
- Jacky Courtillat

Men's team foil

- Jean-Claude Magnan, Daniel Revenu, Jacky Courtillat, Pierre Rodocanachi, Christian Noël

Men's épée

- Claude Bourquard
- Jack Guittet
- Yves Dreyfus

Men's team épée

- Claude Brodin, Yves Dreyfus, Claude Bourquard, Jack Guittet, Jacques Brodin

Men's sabre

- Claude Arabo
- Marcel Parent
- Jacques Lefèvre

Men's team sabre

- Jean-Ernest Ramez, Jacques Lefèvre, Claude Arabo, Marcel Parent, Robert Fraisse

Women's foil

- Cathérine Rousselet-Ceretti
- Brigitte Gapais-Dumont
- Annick Level

Women's team foil

- Cathérine Rousselet-Ceretti, Marie-Chantal Depetris-Demaille, Brigitte Gapais-Dumont, Annick Level, Colette Revenu

== Rowing ==
France had 22 male rowers participate in five rowing events in 1960.

Men's double sculls – 6th place
René Duhamel, Bernard Monnereau

Men's coxed pair – 2nd place ( Silver medal)
Jacques Morel, Georges Morel, Jean-Claude Darouy

Men's coxless four – 10th place
Jean-Pierre Drivet, Roger Chatelain, Philippe Malivoire, Émile Clerc

Men's coxed four – 4th place
Yves Fraisse, Claude Pache, Gérard Jacquesson, Michel Dumas, Jean-Claude Darouy

Men's eight – 7th place
André Fevret, Pierre Maddaloni, André Sloth, Joseph Moroni, Robert Dumontois, Jean-Pierre Grimaud, Bernard Meynadier, Michel Viaud, Alain Bouffard

== Shooting ==
Four shooters represented France in 1964.

25 m pistol

- Jean Renaux

50 m pistol

- Jean Renaux

50 m rifle, prone

- Pierre Guy

Trap

- Claude Foussier
- Michel Prévost

== Swimming ==
Men

Athlete	Event	Heat		Semifinal		Final	
Athlete	Event	Time	Rank	Time	Rank	Time	Rank
Jean-Pascal Curtillet	100 m freestyle	56.2	=28	Did not advance			
Alain Gottvallès	100 m freestyle	55.2	=7 Q	54.3	=3 Q	54.2	5
Gérard Gropaiz	100 m freestyle	55.8	=18 Q	55.7	=15	Did not advance	
Francis Luyce	400 m freestyle	4:33.2	=29	—N/a		Did not advance	
Robert Christophe	200 m backstroke	2:22.5	24	Did not advance			
Alain Gottvallès; Gérard Gropaiz; Pierre Canavèse; Jean-Pascal Curtillet; Robert Christophe	4 × 100 m freestyle relay	3:42.1	6 Q	—N/a		DSQ	
Jean-Pascal Curtillet; Pierre Canavèse; Francis Luyce; Alain Gottvallès	4 × 200 m freestyle relay	8:17.0	6 Q	—N/a		8:08.7	6

Women

Athlete	Event	Heat		Semifinal		Final	
Athlete	Event	Time	Rank	Time	Rank	Time	Rank
Monique Piétri	100 m freestyle	1:05.8	33	Did not advance			
Françoise Borie	100 m backstroke	1:11.8	=15	—N/a		Did not advance	
Kiki Caron	100 m backstroke	1:08.5	1 Q	—N/a		1:07.9	2nd place, silver medalist(s)
