= France at the 1968 Summer Olympics =

- IOC code: FRA
- NOC: French Olympic Committee

in Mexico City
- Competitors: 200 (169 men, 31 women) in 16 sports
- Flag bearer: Kiki Caron
- Medals Ranked 6th: Gold 7 Silver 3 Bronze 5 Total 15

Summer Olympics appearances (overview)
- 1896; 1900; 1904; 1908; 1912; 1920; 1924; 1928; 1932; 1936; 1948; 1952; 1956; 1960; 1964; 1968; 1972; 1976; 1980; 1984; 1988; 1992; 1996; 2000; 2004; 2008; 2012; 2016; 2020; 2024

Other related appearances
- 1906 Intercalated Games

France competed at the 1968 Summer Olympics in Mexico City, Mexico. 200 competitors, 169 men and 31 women, took part in 107 events in 16 sports.

== Medalists ==
=== Gold ===
- Colette Besson — Athletics, Women's 400 metres
- Daniel Morelon — Cycling, Men's 1000m Sprint (Scratch)
- Pierre Trentin — Cycling, Men's 1000m Time Trial
- Daniel Rebillard — Cycling, Men's 4000m Individual Pursuit
- Daniel Morelon and Pierre Trentin — Cycling, Men's 2000m Tandem
- Jean-Jacques Guyon — Equestrian, Three-Day Event Individual
- Gilles Berolatti, Jacques Dimont, Jean-Claude Magnan, Christian Noël, and Daniel Revenu — Fencing, Men's Foil Team

=== Silver ===
- Pierre Jonquères d'Oriola, Janou Lefebvre and Marcel Rozier — Equestrian, Jumping Team
- Daniel Robin — Wrestling, Men's Greco-Roman Welterweight
- Daniel Robin — Wrestling, Men's Freestyle Welterweight

=== Bronze ===
- Roger Bambuck, Jocelyn Delecour, Gérard Fenouil, and Claude Piquemal — Athletics, Men's 4 × 100 m Relay
- Pierre Trentin — Cycling, Men's 1000m Sprint (Scratch)
- Daniel Revenu — Fencing, Men's Foil Individual
- Raoul Gueguen, Jean-Pierre Guidicelli, and Lucien Guiguet — Modern Pentathlon, Men's Team Competition
- Alain Mosconi — Swimming, Men's 400m Freestyle

== Cycling ==
Fourteen cyclists represented France in 1968.

Individual road race

- Stéphan Abrahamian
- Alain Vasseur
- Daniel Ducreux
- Jean-Pierre Paranteau

Team time trial

- Jean-Pierre Boulard
- Robert Bouloux
- Jean-Pierre Danguillaume
- Claude le Chatellier

Sprint

- Daniel Morelon
- Pierre Trentin

1000m time trial

- Pierre Trentin

Tandem

- Daniel Morelon
- Pierre Trentin

Individual pursuit

- Daniel Rébillard

Team pursuit

- Bernard Darmet
- Daniel Rébillard
- Jack Mourioux
- Alain van Lancker

== Fencing ==
20 fencers, 15 men and 5 women, represented France in 1968.

Men's foil

- Daniel Revenu
- Christian Noël
- Jean-Claude Magnan

Men's team foil

- Jean-Claude Magnan, Daniel Revenu, Christian Noël, Gilles Berolatti, Jacques Dimont

Men's épée

- Jean-Pierre Allemand
- Jacques La Degaillerie
- Claude Bourquard

Men's team épée

- François Jeanne, Claude Bourquard, Yves Boissier, Jacques La Degaillerie, Jean-Pierre Allemand

Men's sabre

- Serge Panizza
- Marcel Parent
- Claude Arabo

Men's team sabre

- Marcel Parent, Claude Arabo, Bernard Vallée, Serge Panizza, Jean-Ernest Ramez

Women's foil

- Brigitte Gapais-Dumont
- Marie-Chantal Depetris-Demaille
- Cathérine Rousselet-Ceretti

Women's team foil

- Cathérine Rousselet-Ceretti, Brigitte Gapais-Dumont, Marie-Chantal Depetris-Demaille, Claudette Herbster-Josland, Annick Level

== Modern pentathlon ==
Three male pentathletes represented France in 1968. The team won the bronze medal.

Individual

- Raoul Gueguen
- Lucien Guiguet
- Jean-Pierre Giudicelli

Team

- Raoul Gueguen
- Lucien Guiguet
- Jean-Pierre Giudicelli

== Shooting ==
Eight shooters, all men, represented France in 1968.

50 m pistol

- Louis Vignaud
- Paul Musso

50 m rifle, prone

- Jean-Luc Loret
- André Noël

Trap

- Pierre Candelo
- Michel Carrega

Skeet

- Alain Plante
- Jean-Paul Faber
