= Hungary at the 1964 Summer Olympics =

- IOC code: HUN
- NOC: Hungarian Olympic Committee

in Tokyo
- Competitors: 182 (150 men and 32 women) in 17 sports
- Flag bearer: Gergely Kulcsár
- Medals Ranked 6th: Gold 10 Silver 7 Bronze 5 Total 22

Summer Olympics appearances (overview)
- 1896; 1900; 1904; 1908; 1912; 1920; 1924; 1928; 1932; 1936; 1948; 1952; 1956; 1960; 1964; 1968; 1972; 1976; 1980; 1984; 1988; 1992; 1996; 2000; 2004; 2008; 2012; 2016; 2020; 2024; 2028

Other related appearances
- 1906 Intercalated Games

Hungary competed at the 1964 Summer Olympics in Tokyo, Japan. 182 competitors, 150 men and 32 women, took part in 111 events in 17 sports.

== Medalists ==
=== Gold ===
- Árpád Bárány, Tamás Gábor, István Kausz, Győző Kulcsár, and Zoltán Nemere — Fencing, Men's Épée Team Competition
- Tibor Pézsa — Fencing, Men's Sabre Individual
- Ildikó Rejtő — Fencing, Women's Foil Individual
- Paula Marosi, Katalin Juhász, Judit Ágoston, Lídia Dömölky, and Ildikó Rejtő — Fencing, Women's Foil Team Competition
- Ferenc Török — Modern Pentathlon, Men's Individual Competition
- László Hammerl — Shooting, Men's Small-bore Rifle, prone
- Imre Polyák — Wrestling, Men's Greco-Roman Featherweight
- István Kozma — Wrestling, Men's Greco-Roman Heavyweight
- Ferenc Bene, Tibor Csernai, János Farkas, József Gelei, Kálmán Ihász, Sándor Katona, Imre Komora, Ferenc Nógrádi, Dezső Novák, Árpád Orbán, Károly Palotai, Antal Szentmihályi, Gusztáv Szepesi, and Zoltán Varga — Football (soccer), Men's Team Competition
- Miklós Ambrus, András Bodnár, Ottó Boros, Zoltán Dömötör, László Felkai, Dezső Gyarmati, Tivadar Kanizsa, György Kárpáti, János Konrád, Mihály Mayer, Dénes Pócsik, and Péter Rusorán — Water Polo, Men's Team Competition

=== Silver ===
- Gyula Zsivótzky — Athletics, Men's Hammer Throw
- Gergely Kulcsár — Athletics, Men's Javelin Throw
- Márta Rudas — Athletics, Women's Javelin Throw
- Mihály Hesz — Canoeing, Men's K1 1000m Kayak Singles
- Katalin Makray — Gymnastics, Women's Uneven Bars
- Imre Földi — Weightlifting, Men's Bantamweight
- Géza Tóth — Weightlifting, Men's Light Heavyweight

=== Bronze ===
- Vilmos Varju — Athletics, Men's Shot Put
- Anikó Ducza — Gymnastics, Women's Floor Exercises
- Imre Nagy, Ferenc Török and Ottó Török — Modern Pentathlon, Men's Team Competition
- László Hammerl — Shooting, Men's Small-bore Rifle, Three Positions
- Győző Veres — Weightlifting, Men's Light Heavyweight

== Cycling ==
Seven cyclists represented Hungary in 1964.

Individual road race

- János Juszkó
- András Mészáros
- Antal Megyerdi
- László Mahó

Team time trial

- János Juszkó
- András Mészáros
- László Mahó
- Ferenc Stámusz

Sprint

- Richárd Bicskey
- Ferenc Habony

1000m time trial

- Ferenc Habony

Tandem

- Richárd Bicskey
- Ferenc Habony

== Fencing ==
20 fencers, 15 men and 5 women, represented Hungary in 1964. Hungarian fencers topped the medal table for the event, with four gold.

Men's foil

- Jenő Kamuti
- Sándor Szabó
- József Gyuricza

Men's team foil

- Jenő Kamuti, László Kamuti, József Gyuricza, Sándor Szabó, Béla Gyarmati

Men's épée

- Zoltán Nemere
- Győző Kulcsár
- István Kausz

Men's team épée

- Győző Kulcsár, Zoltán Nemere, Tamás Gábor, István Kausz, Árpád Bárány

Men's sabre

- Tibor Pézsa
- Attila Kovács
- Péter Bakonyi

Men's team sabre

- Péter Bakonyi, Miklós Meszéna, Attila Kovács, Zoltán Horváth, Tibor Pézsa

Women's foil

- Ildikó Ságiné Ujlakyné Rejtő
- Katalin Nagyné Juhász
- Lídia Sákovicsné Dömölky

Women's team foil

- Ildikó Ságiné Ujlakyné Rejtő, Lídia Sákovicsné Dömölky, Katalin Nagyné Juhász, Judit Ágoston-Mendelényi, Paula Marosi

== Modern pentathlon ==
Three male pentathletes represented Hungary in 1964. Ferenc Török won an individual gold and the team won bronze.

Individual

- Ferenc Török
- Imre Nagy
- Ottó Török

Team

- Ferenc Török
- Imre Nagy
- Ottó Török

== Shooting ==
Eight shooters represented Hungary in 1964. László Hammerl won gold in the 50 m rifle, prone and won the bronze in the 50 m rifle, three positions.

25 m pistol

- Szilárd Kun
- Gábor Balla

50 m pistol

- Lajos Kelemen
- Ferenc Gönczi

300 m rifle, three positions

- Zoltán Sándor
- Imre Simkó

50 m rifle, three positions

- László Hammerl
- Tibor Jakosits

50 m rifle, prone

- László Hammerl
- Tibor Jakosits

== Volleyball ==
Men's Team Competition

- Round Robin

- Lost to Czechoslovakia (3-2)
- Defeated Japan (3-0)
- Defeated United States (3-0)
- Lost to Soviet Union (0-3)
- Lost to Brazil (2-3)
- Lost to Romania (1-3)
- Defeated Netherlands (3-1)
- Defeated South Korea (3-2)
- Lost to Bulgaria (1-3) → Sixth place

- Team Roster

- Bela Czafik
- Vilmos Ivancso
- Csabas Lantos
- Gabor Bodo
- István Molnar
- Otto Prouza
- Ferenc Tuske
- Tibor Florián
- Laszlo Galos
- Antal Kangyerka
- Mihaly Tatar
- Ferenc Janosi
