= Zarnegar =

Zarnegar (Persian: زرنگار) may refer to:

== Computing ==
- Zarnegar (word processor)

== Places ==
- Zarnegar Park, in Afghanistan

== People with the surname ==
- Bijan Zarnegar (1940–2017), Iranian fencer
- Esfandiar Zarnegar (born 1942), Iranian fencer
- Shahpour Zarnegar (1929–2022), Iranian fencer
