= Marcel Parent =

Marcel Parent may refer to:

- Marcel Parent (fencer) (born 1934), fencer from France
- Marcel Parent (politician) (1932-2024), member of the National Assembly of Quebec
