= Boutmy =

Boutmy is a surname. Notable people with the surname include:

- Émile Boutmy (1835–1906), French political scientist and sociologist
- Jan Boutmy (born 1930), Dutch fencer
- Joop Boutmy (1894–1972), Dutch footballer
- Josse Boutmy (1697–1779), Belgian composer
