= Ochyra (surname) =

Ochyra is a surname. Notable people with the surname include:

- Emil Ochyra (1936–1980), Polish fencer
- Ryszard Ochyra (born 1949), Polish bryologist
