= Jakosits =

Jakosits is a surname. Notable people with the surname include:

- Michael Jakosits (born 1970), German sport shooter
- Tibor Jakosits (born 1938), Hungarian sport shooter
