= Róbert Varga =

Róbert Varga may refer to:

- Róbert Varga (footballer) (born 1986), Hungarian footballer
- Róbert Varga (tennis) (born 1988), Hungarian tennis player
- Robert Varga (cyclist) (born 1941), French cyclist
- Róbert Varga (ice hockey)
