= Canavese (surname) =

Canavese or Canavèse is an Italian surname. Notable people with the surname include:

- Antonin Canavese (1929 – 2016), French racing cyclist
- Dominique Canavèse (1923 – 2006), French racing cyclist
- Pierre Canavèse (born 1945), French former freestyle swimmer

== See also ==
- Canavese (disambiguation)
- Canavesi
