= Canavese (disambiguation) =

Canavese may refer to:

- Canavese, a subalpine geographical and historical area of North-West Italy which lies today within the Province of Turin in Piedmont.
- Canavese (wine) or Piemonte, the range of Italian wines made in the province of Piedmont in the northwestern corner of Italy.
- F.C. Canavese, was an Italian association football club located in San Giusto Canavese, Piedmont.
- Canavese (surname), surname
