= Canavesi =

Canavesi is a surname. Notable people with the surname include:

- Adhemar Canavesi (1903–1984), Uruguayan footballer
- Jorge Canavesi (1920–2016), Argentine basketball player and coach
- Severino Canavesi (1911–1990), Italian cyclist

== See also ==
- Canavese (surname)
