= Cuba at the 1964 Summer Olympics =

- IOC code: CUB
- NOC: Cuban Olympic Committee

in Tokyo
- Competitors: 27 (25 men and 2 women) in 6 sports
- Flag bearer: Ernesto Varona
- Medals Ranked 30th: Gold 0 Silver 1 Bronze 0 Total 1

Summer Olympics appearances (overview)
- 1900; 1904; 1908–1920; 1924; 1928; 1932–1936; 1948; 1952; 1956; 1960; 1964; 1968; 1972; 1976; 1980; 1984–1988; 1992; 1996; 2000; 2004; 2008; 2012; 2016; 2020; 2024

Cuba competed at the 1964 Summer Olympics in Tokyo, Japan. Twenty-seven competitors, twenty-five men and two women, took part in twenty-four events in six sports. Cuba won one silver medal, by Enrique Figuerola in the 100 metre sprint, behind 28 countries with multiple medals, three with a single gold medal, tied for 30th with Argentina, Pakistan and the Philippines with a single silver each. Weightlifter Ernesto Varona was the flagbearer.

== Medalists ==
Medal	Name	Sport	Event	Date
Silver	Enrique Figuerola	Athletics	Men's 100 m	October 15

== Athletics ==
Bob Hayes was the heavy favorite in the 100 metres, not having lost a race from 1962 onward and having broken the world record for the 100-yard dash in 1963. The Olympic final was no different; he won with a time of 10.0 seconds. Enrique Figuerola and Canadian Harry Jerome finished with identical times of 10.2 seconds, but Figuerola edged Jerome to take the silver medal.

Miguelina Cobián became the first Cuban woman to reach the final of an Olympic sprint event, finishing in 5th place in the 100 metres. She also ran in the 200 metres.

Lázaro Aristides Betancourt competed in the 110 metres hurdles, but did not reach the podium.

== Boxing ==
Rafael Carbonell fought as a flyweight, Fermin Espinosa as a bantamweight, Roberto Caminero as a featherweight, Bienvenido Hita as a lightweight, Félix Betancourt as a light welterweight and Virgilio Jiménez as a welterweight.

== Fencing ==
Two fencers, one man and one woman, represented Cuba in 1964.

Enrique Penabella placed 5th in the men's foil event and 8th in the men's sabre, while Mireya Rodríguez competed in the women's foil.

== Gymnastics ==
Carlos García, Andrés González, Pablo Hernández, Félix Padron, Héctor Ramírez and Octavio Suárez participated in all seven individual events—all around, floor exercise, horizontal bar, parallel bars, pommel horse, rings and vault—as well as the team competition.

== Rowing ==
Cuba sent teams to compete in the four-oared and eight-oared shells with coxswain, with Roberto Ojeda serving as the coxswain for both events. Norge Marrero was a member of the eight-man crew.

== Weightlifting ==
Ernesto Varona competed in the heavyweight class, placing 15th.
