= Rolando Rigoli =

Italian fencer (born 1940)

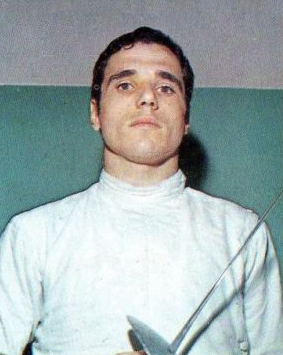
- Rolando Rigoli c. 1968

Personal information
- Born: 3 October 1940 (age 85) Livorno, Italy
- Height: 1.75 m (5 ft 9 in)
- Weight: 75 kg (165 lb)

Sport
- Sport: Fencing
Medal record
Representing Italy
Olympic Games
Gold medal – first place	1972 Munich	Team sabre
Silver medal – second place	1968 Mexico City	Team sabre
Mediterranean Games
Gold medal – first place	1971 Izmir	Individual sabre

Rolando Rigoli (born 3 October 1940) is a retired Italian fencer. He competed at the 1968 and 1972 Olympics in the individual and team sabre events and won a silver and a gold team medal, respectively. He also competed at the 1971 Mediterranean Games where he won a gold medal in the individual sabre event.
