= Mohammad Jafar Kalani =

Iranian sport shooter

- Born: 1 May 1928 (age 97); Iran
- Occupation: Olympic athlete
- Known for: Rifle record holder

Mohammad Jafar Kalani (Persian: محمدجعفر کلانی; born 1 May 1928) was the Iranian record holder in the small rifle 50m prone shooting category, with a record of 591 (out of a maximum of 600).

== Shooting career ==
He started shooting at the age of 33, when most sportsmen in this field retire. He was a member of the Iranian shooting team at the 1964 Tokyo Olympics and in 1967, he matched the Asian record in 50 m prone category that was set in the Bangkok Asian Olympics with a score of 585. He was the Iranian record holder for 11 years.

== Later life ==
He spent most of his career working for sports-related organisations. As well as working in Tarbiate Badani physical education organization, he was the Head of the accounting department for football, weightlifting, and wrestling federations in Iran. He was the organiser of the 1974 Munich Olympics readiness camp and many other camps for different sports. After retiring in 1975, he continued to work part-time with football, shooting and horse riding federations.
