= Simin Safamehr =

Iranian sprinter (born 1947)

Personal information
- Nationality: Iranian
- Born: 14 June 1947
- Died: 2016 (aged 68) Tehran, Iran

Sport
- Sport: Sprinting
- Event(s): 100 metres, long jump

Achievements and titles
- Personal best(s): 13.2 (100 m); 5.06 m (Long jump)

Simin Safamehr (Persian: سیمین صفامهر; 14 June 1947 – March 2016) was an Iranian sprinter. She competed in the women's 100 metres and women's long jump at the 1964 Summer Olympics. She was the first woman to represent Iran at the Olympics.
