= Jean Renaux =

French sports shooter (1933–2018)

Personal information
- Born: 25 June 1933 Marseille, France
- Died: 11 February 2018 (aged 84)

Sport
- Sport: Sports shooting

Jean Renaux (25 June 1933 – 11 February 2018) was a French sports shooter. He competed at the 1960 Summer Olympics and the 1964 Summer Olympics.
