= Giampaolo Calanchini =

Italian fencer (1937–2007)

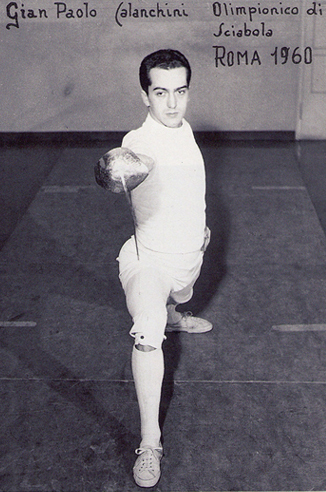
- Giampaolo Calanchini in 1960

Personal information
- Born: 4 February 1937 Ferrara, Italy
- Died: 19 March 2007 (aged 70) Bologna, Italy
- Height: 1.78 m (5 ft 10 in)
- Weight: 73 kg (161 lb)

Sport
- Sport: Fencing
- Club: Virtus Bologna
Medal record
Representing Italy
Olympic Games
Bronze medal – third place	1960 Rome	Sabre, team
Silver medal – second place	1964 Tokyo	Sabre, team
World championships
Silver medal – second place	1965 Paris	Sabre, team

Giampaolo Calanchini (4 February 1937 – 19 March 2007) was an Italian fencer. He won a bronze medal in the team sabre at the 1960 Summer Olympics and a silver in the same event at the 1964 Summer Olympics.
