= László Hammerl =

Hungarian sport shooter (1942–2024)

- Hammerl in 1965

Personal information
- Born: 15 February 1942 Budapest, Hungary
- Died: 3 May 2024 (aged 82) Budapest

Sport
- Sport: Sport shooting
Medal record
Men's shooting
Representing Hungary
Olympic Games
| Gold medal – first place | 1964 Tokyo | 50 metre rifle prone |
| Silver medal – second place | 1968 Mexico City | 50 metre rifle prone |
| Bronze medal – third place | 1964 Tokyo | 50 metre rifle three |

László Hammerl (15 February 1942 – 3 May 2024) was a Hungarian sport shooter and Olympic champion. He won a gold medal in the 50 metre rifle prone event at the 1964 Summer Olympics in Tokyo. In 2004, he was selected as one of Hungary's original dozen Athletes of the Nation.

== Personal life ==
Hammerl was born in Budapest on 15 February 1942. He was married to Éva Fórián. He died in Budapest on 3 May 2024, at the age of 82.
