= Boris Melnikov (fencer) =

Russian fencer (1938–2022)

Personal information
- Born: Boris Borisovich Melnikov; 16 May 1938 Leningrad, RSFSR, Soviet Union
- Died: 5 February 2022 (aged 83) Saint Petersburg, Russia

Sport
- Sport: Fencing
Medal record
Men's fencing
Representing Soviet Union
Olympic Games
Gold medal – first place	1964 Tokyo	Team sabre
World Championships
Gold medal – first place	1965 Paris	Team sabre
Gold medal – first place	1967 Montreal	Team sabre
Summer Universiade
Silver medal – second place	1963 Porto Alegre	Team sabre
Bronze medal – third place	1963 Porto Alegre	Individual sabre

Boris Borisovich Melnikov (Russian: Борис Борисович Мельников; 16 May 1938 – 5 February 2022) was a Russian fencer. He won a gold medal in the team sabre event at the 1964 Summer Olympics.

Melnikov died in Saint Petersburg on 5 February 2022, at the age of 83.
