= Mihály Tatár =

Hungarian volleyball player

Personal information
- Nationality: Hungarian
- Born: 4 July 1937 (age 87); Káloz, Hungary

Sport
- Sport: Volleyball

Mihály Tatár (born 4 July 1937) is a Hungarian volleyball player. He competed in the men's tournament at the 1964 Summer Olympics.
