= Mario Ravagnan =

Italian fencer (1930–2006)

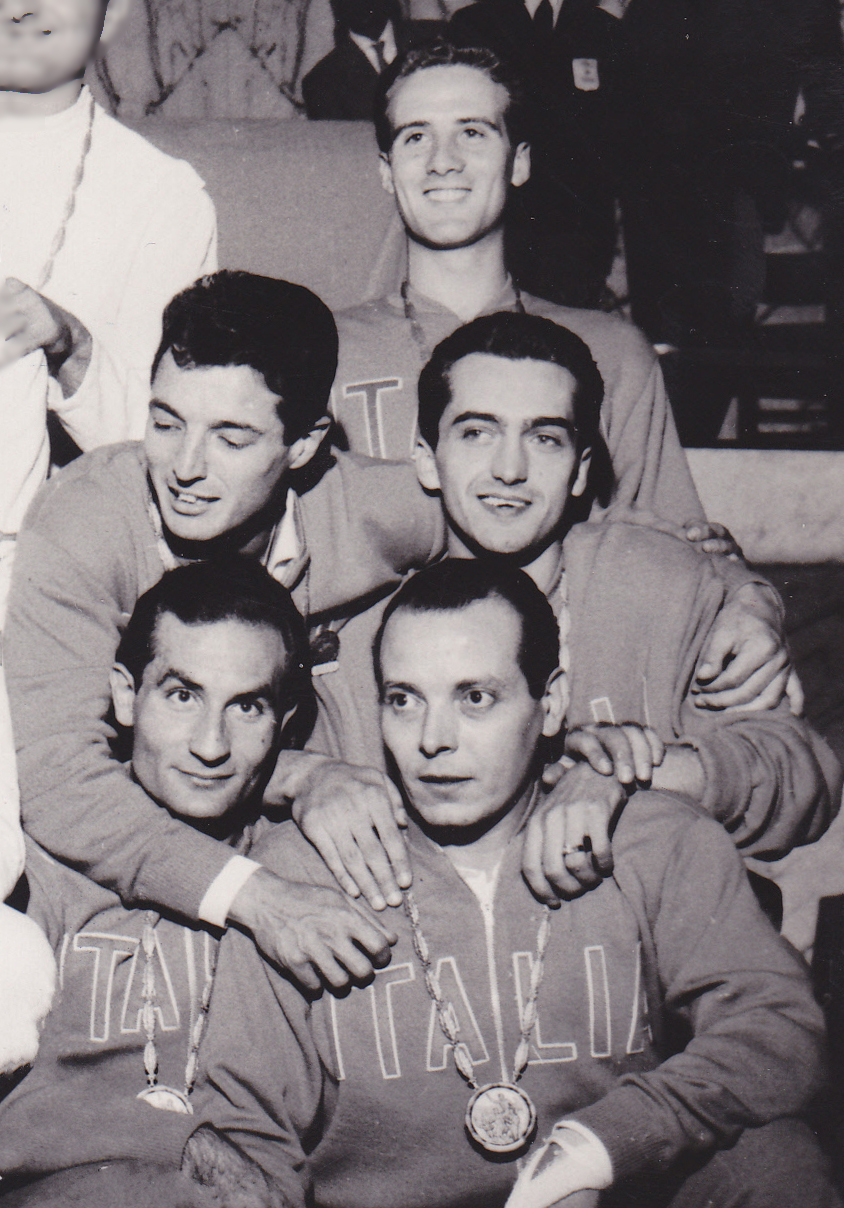
- Italian sabre team at the 1960 Olympics, Ravagnan is top-left

Personal information
- Born: 18 December 1930 Padua, Italy
- Died: 13 December 2006 (aged 75) Turin, Italy
- Height: 1.80 m (5 ft 11 in)
- Weight: 73 kg (161 lb)

Sport
- Sport: Fencing
- Club: Club Scherma Torino
Medal record
Representing Italy
Olympic Games
Silver medal – second place	1964 Tokyo	Team sabre
Bronze medal – third place	1960 Rome	Team sabre
Summer Universiade
Silver medal – second place	1959 Turin	Team sabre

Mario Ravagnan (18 December 1930 – 13 December 2006) was an Italian fencer. He won a bronze medal in the team sabre event at the 1960 Summer Olympics and a silver in the same event at the 1964 Summer Olympics.
