= Vicente Calderón (fencer) =

Mexican fencer (born 1948)

Personal information
- Born: Vicente Calderón Ramírez; 15 December 1948 (age 77) Mexico City, Mexico

Sport
- Sport: Fencing

Vicente Calderón Ramírez (born 15 December 1948) is a Mexican foil and sabre fencer. He competed at the 1968 and 1972 Summer Olympics.
