= Alexander Martonffy =

Australian fencer

Personal information
- Born: 7 May 1919

Sport
- Sport: Fencing
- Club: VRI Fencing Club
Medal record
Fencing
Representing Australia
British Empire (and Commonwealth) Games
Silver medal – second place	1958 Cardiff	Men's Team Sabre

Alexander Martonffy (born 7 May 1919) was an Australian fencer. He competed at the 1956 and 1964 Summer Olympics. He was a longstanding member of the Melbourne-based VRI Fencing Club.
