= Pierre Canavèse =

French swimmer

Personal information
- Born: 10 September 1945 (age 80)

Sport
- Sport: Swimming

Pierre Canavèse (born 10 September 1945) is a French former freestyle swimmer. He competed in two events at the 1964 Summer Olympics.
