= Percy Borucki =

German fencer

Personal information
- Born: 22 July 1929 Katowice, Second Polish Republic

Sport
- Sport: Fencing

Percy Borucki (born 22 July 1929) is a German fencer. He represented the United Team of Germany at the 1964 Summer Olympics and West Germany at the 1968 Summer Olympics in the team sabre events.
