= Pierluigi Chicca =

Italian fencer (1937–2017)

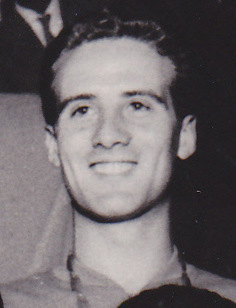

Personal information
- Born: 22 December 1937 Livorno, Italy
- Died: 18 June 2017 (aged 79) Rome, Italy
- Height: 1.84 m (6 ft 0 in)
- Weight: 70 kg (154 lb)

Sport
- Sport: Fencing
- Club: Club Scherma Torino
Medal record
Representing Italy
Olympic Games
Silver medal – second place	1964 Tokyo	Sabre, team
Silver medal – second place	1968 Mexico City	Sabre, team
Bronze medal – third place	1960 Rome	Sabre, team
World Championships
Silver medal – second place	1965 Paris	Sabre, team

Pierluigi Chicca (22 December 1937 – 18 June 2017) was an Italian fencer. He competed at the 1960, 1964 and 1968 Olympics in the individual and team sabre events and won a team bronze medal in 1960 and team silver medals in 1964 and 1968.
