= Volker Duschner =

German fencer (1945–2022)

Personal information
- Born: 12 October 1945 Schörfling am Attersee, Austria
- Died: 13 June 2022 (aged 76) Tauberbischofsheim, Germany

Sport
- Sport: Fencing

Volker Duschner (12 October 1945 – 13 June 2022) was a German fencer. He competed at the 1968 and 1972 Summer Olympics.
