= Umyar Mavlikhanov =

Russian fencer (1937–1999)

Personal information
- Born: 24 September 1937 Moscow, Russian SFSR, Soviet Union
- Died: 14 July 1999 (aged 61)

Sport
- Sport: Fencing
Medal record
Men's fencing
Representing Soviet Union
Olympic Games
Gold medal – first place	1964 Tokyo	Sabre, team
Gold medal – first place	1968 Mexico City	Sabre, team
Bronze medal – third place	1964 Tokyo	Sabre, individual

Umyar Mavlikhanov (Russian: Умяр Абдуллович Мавлиханов; 24 September 1937 – 14 July 1999) was a Soviet fencer. He won gold in the team sabre events at the 1964 and 1968 Summer Olympics and a bronze in the individual sabre in 1964.
