= Robert Varga (cyclist) =

French cyclist

Personal information
- Born: 23 September 1941 Échirolles, France
- Died: 30 November 2023 (aged 82) Vannes, France

Cycling career
- Sport: Cycling

Robert Varga (23 September 1941 – 30 November 2023) was a former French cyclist. He competed in the individual and team pursuit events at the 1964 Summer Olympics.
