= José Narciso Díaz =

Cuban fencer (born 1950)

Personal information
- Born: 31 October 1950 (age 75) Artemisa, Cuba

Sport
- Sport: Fencing

José Narciso Díaz (born 31 October 1950) is a Cuban fencer. He competed in the individual and team sabre events at the 1968 Summer Olympics.
