= Klaus Allisat =

German fencer (born 1938)

Personal information
- Born: 8 May 1938 (age 88) Berlin, Nazi Germany

Sport
- Sport: Fencing

Klaus Allisat (born 8 May 1938) is a German fencer. He represented the United Team of Germany at the 1964 Summer Olympics and West Germany at the 1968 Summer Olympics in the team sabre events.
