= Rafael González (fencer) =

Argentine fencer (1920–2007)

Personal information
- Born: 29 April 1920 Buenos Aires, Argentina
- Died: 21 August 2007 (aged 87)

Sport
- Sport: Fencing

Rafael González (29 April 1920 – 21 August 2007) was an Argentine fencer. He competed at the 1960 and 1964 Summer Olympics.
