= Anthony Keane =

American fencer

Personal information
- Born: June 30, 1928 New York, New York, U.S.
- Died: April 17, 2016 (aged 87)

Sport
- Sport: Fencing

Anthony Keane (June 30, 1928 – April 17, 2016) was an American fencer. He competed in the individual and team sabre events at the 1968 Summer Olympics.
