= Tibor Jakosits =

Hungarian sports shooter

Personal information
- Born: 18 March 1938 (age 88) Budapest, Hungary

Sport
- Sport: Sports shooting

Tibor Jakosits (born 18 March 1938) is a Hungarian former sports shooter. He competed in two events at the 1964 Summer Olympics.
