= Félix Delgado =

Cuban fencer

Personal information
- Born: 5 February 1949 (age 77) Oriente, Cuba

Sport
- Sport: Fencing

Félix Delgado (born 5 February 1949) is a Cuban fencer. He competed in the individual and team sabre events at the 1968 Summer Olympics.
