= Yves Brasseur =

Belgian fencer

Personal information
- Nationality: Belgian
- Born: 26 February 1943 Ghent, Belgium
- Died: 11 August 2005 (aged 62) Gent

Sport
- Sport: Fencing
- Club: Sint-Michielsgilde, Gent

Achievements and titles
- Olympic finals: Mexico 1964 and Tokyo 1968

Yves Brasseur (26 February 1943 – 11 August 2005) was a Belgian fencer. He competed in the individual sabre events at the 1964 and 1968 Summer Olympics. The Challenge Yves Brasseur has been organized to celebrate his memory and takes place every year in Gent.
