= Octavian Vintilă =

Romanian fencer (1938–2024)

Personal information
- Born: 22 June 1938 Ploieşti, Romania
- Died: 20 April 2024 (aged 85)

Sport
- Sport: Fencing

Octavian Vintilă (22 June 1938 – 20 April 2024) was a Romanian fencer. He competed at the 1964 and 1972 Summer Olympics. He died on 20 April 2024, at the age of 85.
