= Henry Sommerville =

Australian fencer

Personal information
- Born: 7 July 1928
- Died: 6 October 2010 (aged 82)

Sport
- Sport: Fencing

Henry Sommerville (7 July 1928 – 6 October 2010) was an Australian fencer. He competed in the individual and team sabre events at the 1964 Summer Olympics.
