= Enrique Penabella =

Cuban fencer (born 1938)

Personal information
- Born: November 24, 1938 (age 87)

Sport
- Sport: Fencing

Enrique Penabella (born 24 November 1938) is a Cuban fencer. He competed in the individual foil and sabre events at the 1964 Summer Olympics.
