= Teruhiro Kitao =

Japanese fencer

Personal information
- Born: 5 June 1937 (age 89)

Sport
- Sport: Fencing

Teruhiro Kitao (北尾 光弘, Kitao Teruhiro; born 5 June 1937) is a Japanese fencer. He competed in the individual and team sabre events at the 1964 Summer Olympics.
