= Andrzej Piątkowski =

Polish fencer (1934–2010)

Personal information
- Born: 22 October 1934 Warsaw, Poland
- Died: 11 June 2010 (aged 75)

Sport
- Sport: Fencing
Medal record
Men's fencing
Representing Poland
| Silver medal – second place | 1956 Melbourne | Team sabre |
| Silver medal – second place | 1960 Rome | Team sabre |
| Bronze medal – third place | 1964 Tokyo | Team sabre |

Andrzej Ryszard Piątkowski (22 October 1934 – 11 June 2010) was a Polish sabreur who won three medals at the 1956, 1960 and 1964 Summer Olympics.
