= Alfonso Morales (fencer) =

American fencer

Personal information
- Born: May 19, 1937 (age 89) Douglas, Arizona, United States

Sport
- Sport: Fencing

Alfonso Morales (born May 19, 1937) is an American fencer. He competed in the individual and team sabre events at the 1960, 1964, 1968 and 1972 Summer Olympics.

== See also ==
- List of USFA Division I National Champions
- List of NCAA fencing champions
