= Tibor Pézsa =

Hungarian fencer (born 1935)

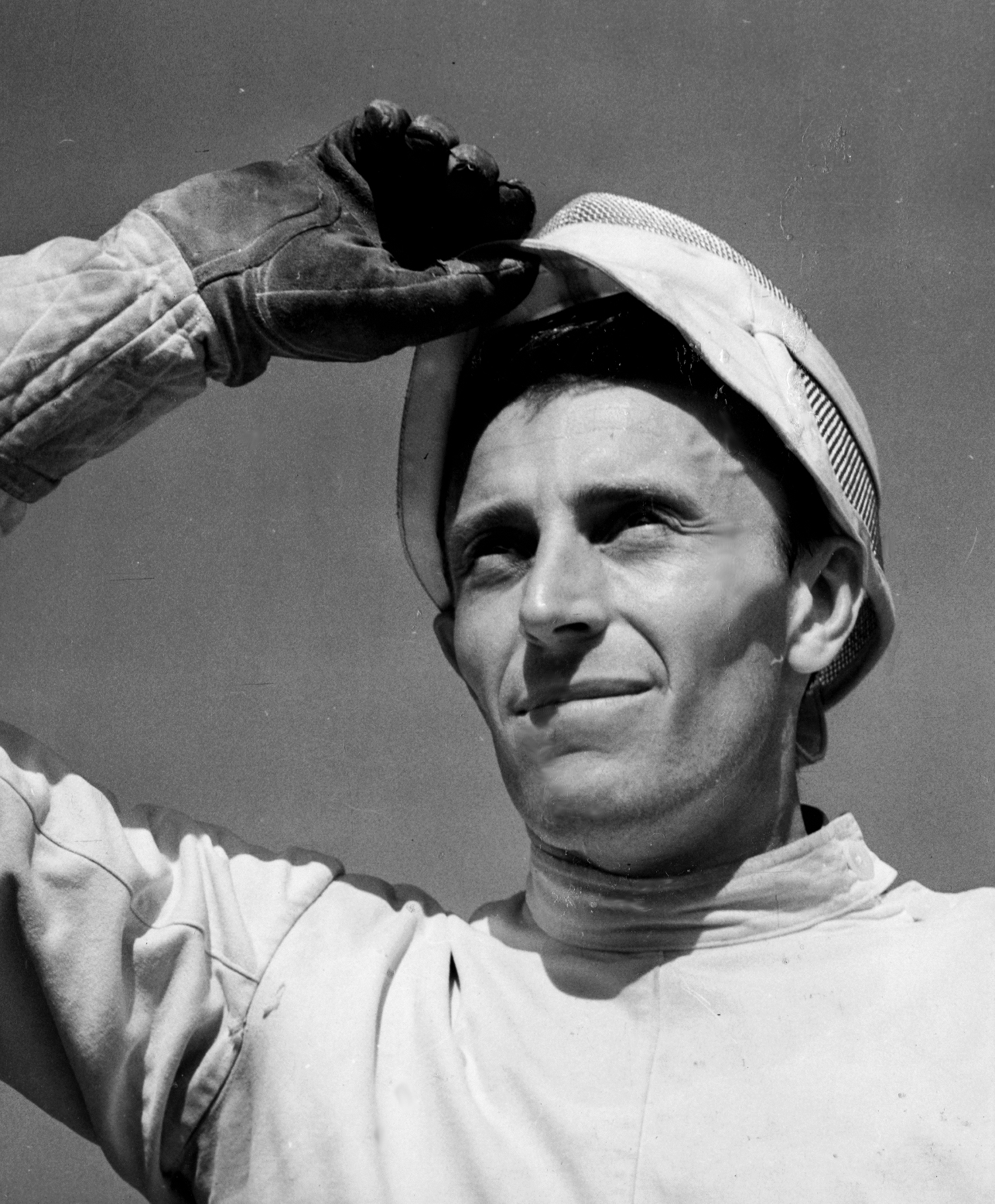
- Tibor Pézsa in 1967

Personal information
- Born: 15 November 1935 (age 90) Esztergom, Hungary
- Height: 191 cm (6 ft 3 in)
- Weight: 85 kg (187 lb)

Sport
- Sport: Fencing
- Club: Bp. Honvéd
Medal record
Representing Hungary
Olympic Games
Gold medal – first place	1964 Tokyo	Sabre individual
Bronze medal – third place	1968 Mexico City	Sabre individual
Bronze medal – third place	1968 Mexico City	Sabre team
Bronze medal – third place	1972 Munich	Sabre team
World Championships
Gold medal – first place	1966 Moscow	Sabre team
Gold medal – first place	1970 Ankara	Sabre individual
Silver medal – second place	1962 Buenos Aires	Sabre team
Silver medal – second place	1966 Moscow	Sabre individual
Silver medal – second place	1967 Montreal	Sabre team
Silver medal – second place	1970 Ankara	Sabre team
Silver medal – second place	1971 Vienna	Sabre team
Bronze medal – third place	1963 Gdańsk	Sabre team
Bronze medal – third place	1967 Montreal	Sabre individual
Summer Universiade
Gold medal – first place	1959 Turin	Sabre team
Gold medal – first place	1961 Sofia	Sabre team
Gold medal – first place	1963 Porto Alegre	Sabre individual
Gold medal – first place	1963 Porto Alegre	Sabre team
Bronze medal – third place	1961 Sofia	Sabre individual

Tibor Pézsa (born 15 November 1935) is a retired Hungarian fencer. He competed in the individual and team sabre events at the 1964, 1968 and 1972 Olympics and won one gold and three bronze medals; he won nine more medals at the World Championships in 1962–1971.
