= Houshmand Almasi =

Iranian fencer (1928–2016)

Personal information
- Born: 30 March 1928
- Died: 17 December 2016 (aged 88) Geneva, Switzerland

Sport
- Sport: Fencing

Houshmand Almasi (Persian: هوشمند الماسی; 30 March 1928 – 17 December 2016) was an Iranian fencer. He competed in the individual and team foil, épée and sabre events at the 1964 Summer Olympics.

Colonel Almasi, president of the Iranian Fencing Federation, submitted the proposed Constitution of Asian Fencing Confederation to the FIE Congress which was held during the 1972 Munich Olympic Games in Germany. Subsequently, he became the first president of AFC.
