= Thomas Orley =

American fencer

Personal information
- Born: February 21, 1934 Budapest, Hungary
- Died: July 3, 2008 (aged 74) Bern, Switzerland

Sport
- Sport: Fencing

Szabolcs Thomas Orley (February 21, 1934 – July 3, 2008) was an American fencer. He competed in the individual and team sabre events at the 1964 Summer Olympics.

== See also ==
- List of USFA Division I National Champions
