= Claude Bourquard =

French fencer (born 1937)

Personal information
- Born: 5 March 1937 (age 89) Belfort, France

Sport
- Sport: Fencing
Medal record
Men's fencing
Representing France
Olympic Games
Bronze medal – third place	1964 Tokyo	Épée, team
Mediterranean Games
Gold medal – first place	1959 Beirut	Team épée
Silver medal – second place	1963 Naples	Individual épée

Claude Bourquard (born 5 March 1937) was a French fencer. He founded Asmb escrime, a fencing club in Besançon.

== Career ==
He competed at the 1964 Summer Olympics in Tokyo, Japan, where he won a bronze medal in the team épée event. He also competed at the Mediterranean Games in 1959, winning a gold medal in the team épée event, and in 1963, winning a silver medal in the individual épée event.

== See also ==
Fencing at the 1964 Summer Olympics
