= Jerzy Pawłowski =

Polish fencer and double agent

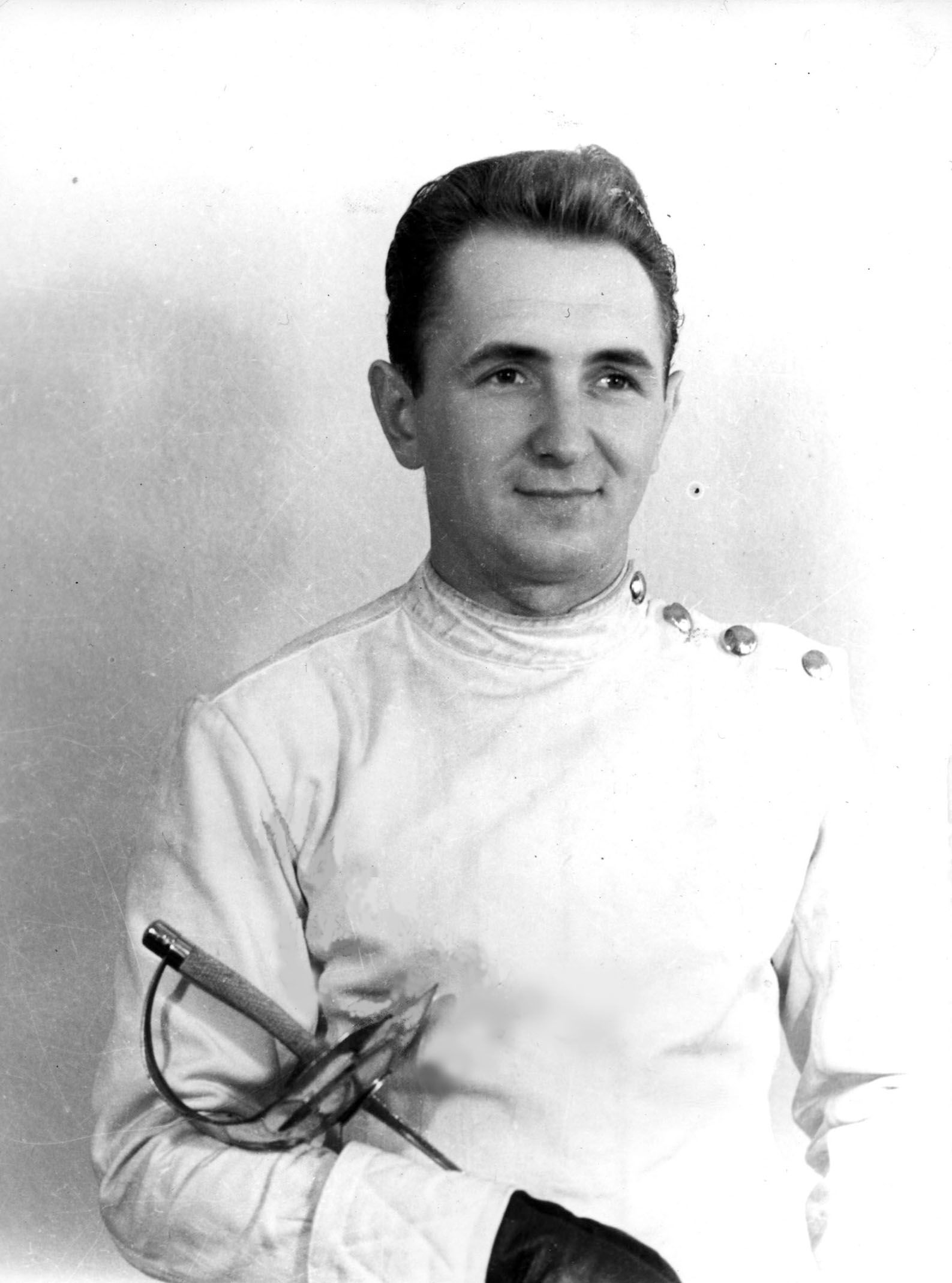
- Pawłowski in 1968

Personal information
- Born: 25 October 1932 Warsaw, Poland
- Died: 11 January 2005 (aged 72) Warsaw, Poland
- Height: 1.74 m (5 ft 9 in)
- Weight: 74 kg (163 lb)

Sport
- Sport: Fencing
- Club: Ogniwo Warszawa; Gwardia Warszawa; Legia Warszawa
Medal record
Representing Poland
| Event | 1st | 2nd | 3rd |
|---|---|---|---|
| Olympic Games | 1 | 3 | 1 |
| World Fencing Championships | 7 | 6 | 5 |
| Total | 8 | 9 | 6 |
Olympic Games
| Gold medal – first place | 1968 Mexico City | Sabre individual |
| Silver medal – second place | 1956 Melbourne | Sabre individual |
| Silver medal – second place | 1956 Melbourne | Sabre team |
| Silver medal – second place | 1960 Rome | Sabre team |
| Bronze medal – third place | 1964 Tokyo | Sabre team |
World Fencing Championships
| Gold medal – first place | 1957 Paris | Sabre individual |
| Gold medal – first place | 1959 Budapest | Sabre team |
| Gold medal – first place | 1961 Turin | Sabre team |
| Gold medal – first place | 1962 Buenos Aires | Sabre team |
| Gold medal – first place | 1963 Gdansk | Sabre team |
| Gold medal – first place | 1965 Moscow | Sabre individual |
| Gold medal – first place | 1966 Moscow | Sabre individual |
| Silver medal – second place | 1954 Luxembourg | Sabre team |
| Silver medal – second place | 1962 Buenos Aires | Sabre individual |
| Silver medal – second place | 1963 Gdansk | Sabre individual |
| Silver medal – second place | 1967 Montreal | Sabre individual |
| Silver medal – second place | 1969 Havana | Sabre team |
| Silver medal – second place | 1971 Viena | Sabre individual |
| Bronze medal – third place | 1953 Brussels | Sabre team |
| Bronze medal – third place | 1957 Paris | Sabre team |
| Bronze medal – third place | 1958 Philadelphia | Sabre team |
| Bronze medal – third place | 1959 Budapest | Sabre individual |
| Bronze medal – third place | 1970 Ankara | Sabre team |

Jerzy Władysław Pawłowski (Polish pronunciation: [ˈjɛʐɨ pavˈwɔfskʲi]; 25 October 1932 – 11 January 2005) was a Polish fencer and double agent. He is regarded among the most successful Polish fencers in history having won 5 Olympic medals as well as seven gold medals at the World Fencing Championships. He was awarded the Polish Sports Personality of the Year title twice, in 1957 and 1968.

== Biography highlights ==
While a major in the Polish Army, Pawłowski won the gold medal in the individual saber event at the 1968 Summer Olympics in Mexico City, the first non-Hungarian in 48 years to win an Olympic sabre gold medal. He took part in a total of six Olympic Games from 1952 to 1972, garnering additionally three silver medals and a bronze at the 1956, 1960 and 1964 Summer Olympics.

In 1967 the International Fencing Federation declared him the best fencer of all time.

He was arrested on 24 April 1975, and on 8 April 1976, was sentenced by a military court in Warsaw to 25 years of prison, 10 years suspension of civic rights, demotion to private, forfeiture of all his property for having committed espionage since 1964 on behalf of an unnamed NATO country, and his name was erased from Polish sporting records. He had in fact been a double agent for the U.S. CIA from 1964, and for Polish intelligence from 1950.

Ten years later, he was to have been included in one of the spy exchanges at Berlin's Glienicke Bridge but chose to remain in Poland and spent the rest of his life as a painter and faith healer in Warsaw, where he died.

== Life and career ==
Pawlowski was born in Warsaw in a family of a car mechanic and studied law at university there. He had a brother named Henryk Pawlowski. Together with his father, he took part in the Warsaw Uprising of 1944. Jerzy joined the army, eventually rising to the rank of major. He took to fencing comparatively late, as a 16-year-old, concentrating on sabre. By 1953 he was runner-up in the world under-21 championships and was part of the team that took bronze at the senior world championships, Poland's first such success since 1934. At the next championships, he came fourth in the individual event behind three Hungarians, who had long exerted a stranglehold on sabre fencing.

At the 1956 Olympics, Pawlowski took silver, and the following year won the world title outright, a success he would repeat in 1965 and 1966, as well as winning gold at the 1968 Olympic Games. In 1959 the Polish team, with Pawlowski its spearhead, finally upset the Hungarians to win the gold medal, which they did again in 1961, 1962 and 1963. Pawlowski was slightly built and about five feet nine inches tall, but he was graceful.

By the 1970s the lightning-fast tearaway had been replaced by a supreme technician with the footwork of a dancer. A rival team manager reckoned Pawlowski had eight different ways of moving forward – each calculated to induce a different reaction. One team mate recalls Pawlowski's lessons with his Hungarian coach, Janos Kevey, their blades moving so fast that even an experienced onlooker could not follow the action. Kevey took to teaching Pawlowski with sabres in each hand: "Why waste time?" he would say. Pawlowski just got faster.

He was not only a hero among fencers. His book on the Olympics, Trud olimpijskiego zlota (The Burden of Olympic Gold, 1973), his regular appearances on television and his talks to sports clubs and army units made him popular all over Poland. He received the highest decorations the state could bestow, and under his auspices fencing grew into one of his country's most popular sports. He was made president of Polish fencing while still an active team member.

In the mid-1960s, when he was completing his law studies, he drove around in a Mercedes 300 – the same car as the country's prime minister. He lived in the centre of Warsaw in a five-room apartment full of antique furniture, expensive books and good paintings. He spoke several languages with ease, and his mischievous charm won him friends worldwide.

Pawlowski seemed never-ageing. In all, he was a world finalist 17 times. In 1973 he reached the final (that is, a round-robin of six fencers) for the last time, aged 42, and only narrowly missed a medal, nearly 20 years after his first. But the following year he was eliminated in the quarter-finals, and never represented his country again.

Then he simply disappeared, "as if he had fallen through the earth", as a Polish reporter put it. News leaked out over that summer that he had been arrested "for crimes against the interests of the state". It leaked out that during 1974 a NATO spy had confessed that one of his five co-agents was "Pawel" – Pawlowski's principal nickname (although he had several others, including "Gracz", "The Card Player", because of his fondness for poker). Just before he was taken into custody, Pawlowski had been pronounced the most outstanding sportsman his country had produced in more than a decade. Time magazine called him "the undisputed sports hero of Poland". Thus, as Neue Zürcher Zeitung put it, "the news of his arrest shocked the Polish public, especially the army and young people, for whom he was almost a national idol". Almost immediately, influential figures in the government and in the army tried to cover up the affair, but the Russian representative to the Warsaw Pact High Command demanded the death penalty. Pawlowski was interrogated for two and a half months and eventually put on trial by a military tribunal, meeting in secret. It gave him a sentence that had no standing under Polish law – 25 years' imprisonment, for espionage "on behalf of an undesignated Nato country". There was talk that Pawlowski avoided death because he used to go shooting – he was a fine marksman – with Wojciech Jaruzelski, the Polish premier; but the court declared that he had been spared because he had admitted his crimes, revealed his contacts and provided a detailed account of his spying activities.

Another of his friends, the acclaimed writer Jerzy Kosinski, introduced the affair into his 1977 novel Blind Date, which tells of "JP . . . the greatest fencer of all time", who is arrested and taken to a "military fortress", where he has his fencing arm broken by his interrogator. In the absence of official versions this totally fictitious description became accepted as an accurate account.

Pawlowski's arrest had immediate repercussions. A number of other officers were tried and sentenced on similar charges. Some 120 Polish fencers were interrogated. Several senior officers were replaced, and even the head of the Polish Navy was relieved of his post. As to what secrets a sportsman could have access, Pawlowski knew several senior officers as friends and moved in exalted circles; he was said to have passed on radar codes for military aircraft. His celebrity gave him little leverage in prison. According to his own account, there were seven men in his cell, paedophiles, psychopaths and mentally deranged prisoners – "the worst types – people on the edge of society". He was allowed 112 Polish zloty (under one GBP) a week, one letter a month, two parcels a year. He took up watercolours, first painting with his prison toothbrush, and became so adept that he was later to exhibit his work widely. He also became unofficial lawyer to the other inmates, helping them with their letters to the authorities. One prisoner who was serving a life sentence for murder became Pawlowski's chess partner. He suffered from head pains, and one day Pawlowski laid his hands on the man's head. The migraines never returned. After his pardon and release in June 1985 Pawlowski practised his healing gifts at one of Warsaw's main hospitals.

By then in his mid-fifties, he also took up fencing again. Soon after he was freed, he went to one of the main Warsaw clubs, challenged the young bloods and won nearly every fight. A few weeks later he entered a classification tournament and just missed the final. Next was the Polish national championships; but parents of young fencers complained that they did not want their sons shaking hands with a traitor. That was the last time he attempted to fence in competition.

He was married three times, lastly to Iwonka, his wife for over 40 years. After her husband was taken into custody, she was told that her work as an obstetrician would be imperilled unless she filed for divorce. She refused, and soon after lost her job. Only after Pawlowski's release did she start working again.

When Pawlowski first got out of prison, he tried to clear his name, planning to take on the minister who had been in charge of investigating him. For a while the government did nothing, but after Pawlowski started making speeches proclaiming his innocence his trial papers were released, and in 1991 a leading magazine, Prawo i Zycie ("Law and Life"), revealed that since August 1955 Pawlowski had been spying for the state against his own team mates – telling the security services which athletes were planning to defect, who supported Israel in the Middle East war, who might be open to approaches. His spying ceased abruptly in March 1962, when it was judged that he was using his position "for personal gain". These and similar articles were even more damaging than the original charges. In 1994 Pawlowski wrote a second, self-justifying book, Najdluzszy Pojedynek (My Longest Duel), exclusively about his days as a spy. As a young boy he had been part of the 1944 Warsaw uprising, he wrote, and that same wish for freedom had remained his motivation. He also detailed "countermeasures" against him by the KGB, including two assassination attempts.

In 2000, he considered legal action against two journalists who he considered had libelled him, and was only persuaded to remain silent when he was told that the government had evidence that while in jail he had agreed to spy against Solidarity prisoners. Thereafter he kept to his painting, his healing work, and his memories. Before his arrest, Pawlowski had fame, unlimited travel, and a pampered life in Poland. He was a Polish zloty billionaire, with money from part-share of a restaurant and from a sheep farm he owned. So what made him spy? "My heart is Polish, my mind American," he would say; but East European fencers laughed at the idea of his motive being ideological: "With Jerzy it was always money." "Jerzy always liked to take risks," a long-time friend and rival explained: Gambling made life more interesting, made the adrenalin run – and if that could be combined with getting more money and hurting the Russians so much the better. But taking risks was at the heart of it: it's what made him such a good fencer.

== See also ==
- List of Poles
- List of athletes with the most appearances at Olympic Games
