= Jan Boutmy =

Dutch fencer (born 1930)

Personal information
- Born: 10 December 1930 (age 95) Netherlands

Sport
- Sport: Fencing

Jan Adolf Boutmy Prins (born 10 December 1930) is a Dutch Antillean fencer. He competed in the individual sabre events at the 1964 and 1968 Summer Olympics. His father, Dop, founded the Netherlands Antilles Fencing Federation.
