= Cesare Salvadori =

Italian fencer (1941–2021)

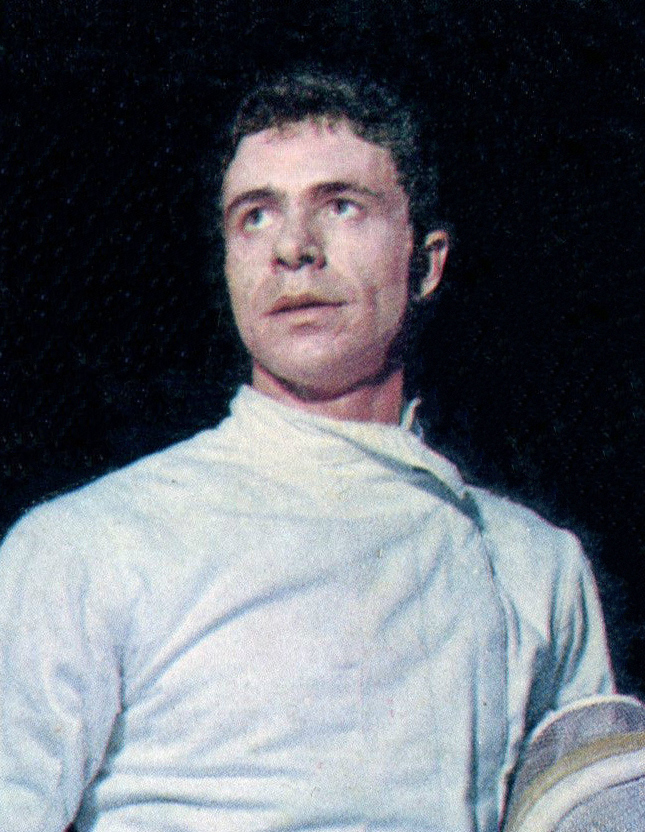
- Cesare Salvadori c. 1968

Personal information
- Born: 22 September 1941 Turin, Italy
- Died: 8 August 2021 (aged 79) Turin, Italy
- Height: 1.70 m (5 ft 7 in)
- Weight: 66 kg (146 lb)

Sport
- Sport: Fencing
- Club: Club Scherma Torino
Medal record
Representing Italy
Olympic Games
Gold medal – first place	1972 Munich	Team sabre
Silver medal – second place	1964 Tokyo	Team sabre
Silver medal – second place	1968 Mexico City	Team sabre
World Championships
Silver medal – second place	1965 Paris	Team sabre
Bronze medal – third place	1971 Vienna	Team sabre
Bronze medal – third place	1973 Gothenburg	Team sabre
Summer Universiade
Gold medal – first place	1967 Tokyo	Team sabre
Silver medal – second place	1967 Tokyo	Individual sabre
Bronze medal – third place	1963 Porto Alegre	Team sabre
Bronze medal – third place	1970 Turin	Team sabre

Cesare Salvadori (22 September 1941 – 8 August 2021) was an Italian sabre fencer. He won a gold and two silver medals with the Italian team at the 1964, 1968, and 1972 Olympics. His best individual achievement at the Summer Games was ninth place in 1964.
