= Michael Ryan (fencer) =

Irish fencer

Personal information
- Born: 26 July 1943 (age 82) Galway, Ireland

Sport
- Sport: Fencing

Michael Ryan (born 26 July 1943) is an Irish épée, foil and sabre fencer. He competed at the 1964 and 1968 Summer Olympics.
