= Serge Panizza =

French fencer

Personal information
- Born: 19 November 1942 Paris, France
- Died: 24 March 2016 (aged 73)

Sport
- Sport: Fencing

Serge Panizza (19 November 1942 – 24 March 2016) was a French sabre fencer. He competed at the 1968 and 1972 Summer Olympics.
