= Dieter Wellmann =

German fencer

Personal information
- Born: Dieter Wellmann; 7 December 1942 (age 83) Szászrégen, Kingdom of Hungary (now Reghin, Romania)

Sport
- Country: Germany, West Germany
- Sport: Fencing
- Retired: Yes

Achievements and titles
- Olympic finals: 1964, 1968, 1972

Dieter Wellmann (born 7 December 1942) is a German fencer. He represented the United Team of Germany in 1964 and West Germany in 1968 and 1972.
