= Shahpour Zarnegar =

Iranian fencer (1929–2022)

Personal information
- Born: 25 March 1929 Kermanshah, Iran
- Died: 12 September 2022 (aged 93) Tehran, Iran

Sport
- Sport: Fencing

Shahpour Zarnegar (Persian: شاپور زرنگار; 25 March 1929 – 12 September 2022) was an Iranian épée, foil and sabre fencer. He competed in four events at the 1964 Summer Olympics.

Shahpur (Shapur) Zarangar, the former official of the Fencing Federation, died in the morning September 12, 2022.

Shahpour Zarangar was born in 1929 in the city of Kermanshah and was a retired police officer, a former member of the academic faculty of Iran Police University and a former member and then coach and head coach of Iran's national fencing teams in the 1970s and 1980s. In 1958 Shahpur Zarangar joined the community of enthusiasts and athletes in fencing in Iran. Shahpur Zarangar established the first provincial fencing team in Kermanshah in 1959.

He was one of the 4 fencers sent to the 1964 Tokyo Olympics. He was also a member of the national team in the 1966 world fencing competition in Moscow.

It was almost after these matches that Shahpour Zarangar became a coach. In 1967, in order to complete his professional knowledge and education in the field of fencing together with another national coach (Bijan Zarangar), he succeeded in obtaining a scholarship and continued his education and received a master's degree in this field of sports in France and at the National Institute of Sports, France in Paris. These two fencers obtained the highest academic ranks among 31 French students and 13 non-French students of the same period, and after the end of this period, the said educational institution gave them a special appreciation and recognized their talent and discipline as an exceptional phenomenon. After his return, Shahpour Zarangar, accompanied by three Iranian and Russian coaches, put the national fencing teams under serious and detailed training. During the six years until the 1974 Asian Games in Tehran, many preparatory competitions were organized inside and outside of Iran. The result of these activities was Iran's leadership of fencing in the Asian continent. This success was achieved in a situation where Iran faced strong rivals such as China and Japan during this period. The medals won in all three disciplines of fencing improved the general ranking of Iranian sports; as Iran's sports ranked after Japan and higher than China. Acting vice president of Iran Fencing Federation and secretary and responsible for the federation's education committee in the 1990s and 2000s were among his last official positions in the federation. One of the activities of Shahpur Zarangar in recent years was the publication of two practical guidebooks for Flore fencing instructors.
