= Attila Kovács (fencer) =

Hungarian fencer (1939–2010)

Personal information
- Born: 30 December 1939 Budapest, Hungary
- Died: 10 November 2010 (aged 70) Budapest, Hungary

Sport
- Sport: Fencing
Medal record
Representing Hungary
World Championships
Gold medal – first place	1973 Gothenburg	Team sabre
Silver medal – second place	1967 Montreal	Team sabre
Bronze medal – third place	1963 Gdansk	Team sabre
Bronze medal – third place	1969 Havana	Team sabre
Summer Universiade
Gold medal – first place	1959 Turin	Team sabre
Gold medal – first place	1961 Sofia	Team sabre
Gold medal – first place	1963 Porto Alegre	Team sabre
Bronze medal – third place	1965 Budapest	Team sabre

Attila Kovács (30 December 1939 – 10 November 2010) was a Hungarian fencer. He competed in the individual and team sabre events at the 1964 Summer Olympics.
