= Mark Rakita =

Soviet fencer

Personal information
- Born: 22 July 1938 (age 87) Moscow, Russian SFSR, Soviet Union

Sport
- Sport: Fencing
Medal record
Men's fencing
Representing Soviet Union
Olympic Games
Gold medal – first place	1964 Tokyo	Team sabre
Gold medal – first place	1968 Mexico City	Team sabre
Silver medal – second place	1968 Mexico City	Individual sabre
Silver medal – second place	1972 Munich	Team sabre

Mark Semenovich Rakita (Russian: Марк Семенович Ракита; born July 22, 1938) is a two-time Olympic champion sabreur and coach from the Soviet era.

== Early life ==
Rakita was born in Moscow, USSR, and is Jewish.

== Fencing career ==
Rakita started fencing when he was 14. He would practice for three to six hours per day. A 1969 graduate of The Daghestan State Pedagogical Institute, Rakita earned the title of Master of the Sport (Fencing) in 1964. He trained at the Armed Forces sports society. He trained under Olympian David Tishler.

=== World championships ===
Rakita was one of the Soviet Union's top sabre fencers in the 1960s. As a member of the Soviet national team, he won the world championship in the team sabre in 1965, 1967, 1969, and 1971. He won bronze medals with the team in 1962 and 1963.

Rakita was also the world champion in individual sabre in 1967, and finished second in 1971.

=== Olympics ===
Rakita participated in three Olympic Games. At the 1964 Summer Olympics, he won a gold medal in team sabre and competed in the individual event. At the 1968 Summer Olympics, he won a silver medal in the individual event and won gold in the team event. At the 1972 Summer Olympics, he competed in the team event, and won a silver medal.

=== World championships ===
- 1967 Individual Sabre (Gold)
- 1967 Team Sabre (Gold)
- 1971 Individual Sabre (Silver)

== Later life ==
Rakita coached the Russian fencing team for 17 years, and four of his students won Olympic medals.

At the 2001 Maccabiah Games, Rakita coached Sergei Sharikov and Maria Mazina to gold medals.

In 2004, he was honorary president of Maccabi Russia.

In an interview in New York, Mark Rakita discussed his long-time feud with former friend/teammate turned nemesis Vladimir Nazlymov, stating, "As far as I'm concerned, he no longer exists!" Rakita also emphasized Nazlymov's Crimean Tatar heritage and called him a traitor for having moved to the United States.

Amid the ban on Russia at the 2024 Summer Olympics, which led to most Russian athletes not participating, Rakita remarked that "we should respon in a way that makes the Americans feel pain".

== Hall of Fame ==
In 1988, Rakita was inducted into the International Jewish Sports Hall of Fame.

== See also ==
- List of select Jewish fencers
- List of Jewish Olympic medalists
