= Seiji Shibata =

Japanese fencer

Personal information
- Born: 3 February 1938 (age 88)

Sport
- Sport: Fencing

Seiji Shibata (柴田 征二, Shibata Seiji; born 3 February 1938) is a Japanese fencer. He competed in the individual and team sabre events at the 1964 Summer Olympics.
