= Alberto Lanteri =

Argentine fencer (born 1938)

Personal information
- Born: 11 January 1938 (age 88) La Plata, Argentina
- Height: 178 cm (5 ft 10 in)
- Weight: 69 kg (152 lb)

Sport
- Country: Argentina
- Sport: Fencing
Medal record
Fencing
Representing Argentina

Alberto Lanteri (born 11 January 1938) is an Argentine fencer. He competed at the 1964 and 1968 Summer Olympics.
