= John Bouchier-Hayes =

Irish fencer (born 1944)

Personal information
- Born: 17 December 1944 (age 81) Dublin, Ireland

Sport
- Sport: Fencing

John Bouchier-Hayes (born 17 December 1944) is an Irish épée, foil, and sabre fencer. He competed at the 1964, 1968 and 1972 Summer Olympics.

From a family of 11 siblings, Bouchier-Hayes took up fencing four years before the Tokyo Olympics after having broken his leg while playing rugby with St Conleth's College. The injury left him hospitalised for a year and ruled out a return to contact sports, so he followed St Conleth’s tradition in fencing.

Bouchier-Hayes was coached by Patrick Duffy, an early Irish fencing Olympian who had competed in the 1948 and 1952 Olympic Games.
