= Bijan Zarnegar =

Iranian fencer (1940–2017)

Personal information
- Born: March 25, 1940 Kermanshah, Iran
- Died: April 21, 2017 (aged 77) Tehran, Iran

Sport
- Sport: Fencing

Bijan Zarnegar (Persian: بیژن زرنگار, 25 March 1940 in Kermanshah, Iran – 21 April 2017 in Tehran, Iran) was an Iranian practitioner of fencing.

He started fencing when he was 18 years old in Tehran while studying at the Police University in Tehran. He worked as a police officer while he was practicing fencing. He competed in the individual and team foil, épée and sabre events at the 1964 Summer Olympics.

He died in 2017 in Tehran.
