= Wladimiro Calarese =

Italian fencer (1930–2005)

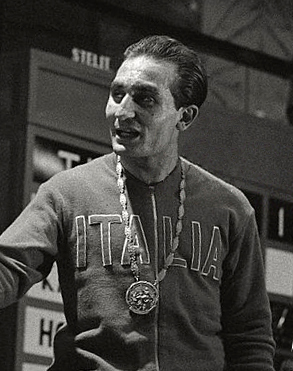
- Wladimiro Calarese at the 1960 Olympics

Personal information
- Born: 3 October 1930 Messina, Italy
- Died: 13 August 2005 (aged 74) Dayton, Ohio, United States
- Height: 1.69 m (5 ft 7 in)
- Weight: 77 kg (170 lb)

Sport
- Sport: Fencing
Medal record
Representing Italy
Olympic Games
Silver medal – second place	1964 Tokyo	Team sabre
Silver medal – second place	1968 Mexico City	Team sabre
Bronze medal – third place	1960 Rome	Team sabre
Bronze medal – third place	1960 Rome	Individual sabre
World Championships
Silver medal – second place	1965 Paris	Team sabre
Bronze medal – third place	1963 Gdańsk	Individual sabre
Mediterranean Games
Gold medal – first place	1955 Barcelona	Team sabre
Gold medal – first place	1963 Naples	Team sabre
Summer Universiade
Gold medal – first place	1959 Turin	Individual sabre
Bronze medal – third place	1959 Turin	Team sabre

Wladimiro Calarese (3 October 1930 – 13 August 2005) was an Italian sabre fencer. He won two bronze medals at the 1960 Summer Olympics and two silver medals, at the 1964 and 1968 Summer Olympics. He also competed at the Mediterranean Games in 1955 and 1963 winning gold medals in the team sabre events.

After retiring from competitions Calarese attained a PhD at New York University and until his death in 2005 lived in the United States. He spent most of his career as a researcher at the Wright-Patterson Air Force Base, but also taught fencing at Wright State University.

In 2009, an international sabre tournament was held in his honour in Palermo, which was attended by the world's best sabre competitors.
