= Walter Köstner =

German fencer (born 1936)

Personal information
- Born: 28 June 1936 (age 90) Bayreuth, Nazi Germany

Sport
- Sport: Fencing

Walter Köstner (born 28 June 1936) is a German fencer. He represented the United Team of Germany in 1960 and 1964 and West Germany in 1968.
