= Juan Carlos Frecia =

Argentine fencer (1930–2025)

Personal information
- Born: 9 July 1930 Buenos Aires, Argentina
- Died: 10 February 2025 (aged 94)

Sport
- Sport: Fencing

Juan Carlos Frecia (9 July 1930 – 10 February 2025) was an Argentine fencer. He competed in the individual and team sabre events at the 1964 and 1968 Summer Olympics. Frecia died on 10 February 2025, at the age of 94.
