= Péter Bakonyi (fencer, born 1938) =

Hungarian fencer

Personal information
- Born: Péter Buchwald; 17 February 1938 (age 88) Budapest, Hungary

Fencing career
- Sport: Fencing
- Country: Hungary
- Weapon: Sabre
- Club: Bp. Honvéd
Medal record
Men's sabre
Representing Hungary
| Event | 1st | 2nd | 3rd |
|---|---|---|---|
| Olympic Games | 0 | 0 | 2 |
| World Championships | 1 | 3 | 4 |
| Total | 1 | 3 | 6 |
Olympic Games
| Bronze medal – third place | 1968 Mexico City | Team |
| Bronze medal – third place | 1972 Munich | Team |
World Championships
| Gold medal – first place | 1966 Moscow | Team |
| Silver medal – second place | 1962 Buenos Aires | Team |
| Silver medal – second place | 1967 Montreal | Team |
| Silver medal – second place | 1971 Vienna | Team |
| Bronze medal – third place | 1961 Turin | Team |
| Bronze medal – third place | 1963 Gdańsk | Team |
| Bronze medal – third place | 1969 Havana | Individual |
| Bronze medal – third place | 1969 Havana | Team |
Summer Universiade
| Gold medal – first place | 1961 Sofia | Individual |
| Gold medal – first place | 1961 Sofia | Team |
| Gold medal – first place | 1963 Porto Alegre | Team |
| Gold medal – first place | 1965 Budapest | Team |
| Silver medal – second place | 1963 Porto Alegre | Individual |
| Silver medal – second place | 1965 Budapest | Individual |

Péter Bakonyi (Buchwald) (born 17 February 1938) is a Hungarian Olympic sabre fencer. He won two Olympic bronze medals, and one World Championship gold medal.

== Biography ==
He was born in Budapest, Hungary, and is Jewish.

In 1966, fencing for Hungary, he won the gold medal in the men's team sabre at the Fencing World Championships.

He won bronze medals for Hungary in the team sabre events at the 1968 and 1972 Summer Olympics. In 1969, he won bronze medals in the individual sabre and team sabre in the Senior Fencing World Championships.

In 2000, he won the gold medal in the Men's Sabre 60+ at the Veteran World Championships.

== See also ==
- List of select Jewish fencers
- List of Jewish Olympic medalists
