= Emil Ochyra =

Polish fencer (1936–1980)

Personal information
- Born: 12 July 1936 Rozbórz, Poland
- Died: 26 May 1980 (aged 43) Warsaw, Poland

Sport
- Sport: Fencing
Medal record
Men's fencing
Representing Poland
Olympic Games
Silver medal – second place	1960 Rome	Team sabre
Bronze medal – third place	1964 Tokyo	Team sabre
World Championships
Gold medal – first place	1959 Budapest	Team sabre
Gold medal – first place	1961 Turin	Team sabre
Gold medal – first place	1962 Buenos Aires	Team sabre
Gold medal – first place	1963 Gdansk	Team sabre
Silver medal – second place	1961 Turin	Individual sabre
Summer Universiade
Silver medal – second place	1959 Turin	Individual sabre
Bronze medal – third place	1959 Turin	Team sabre

Emil Antoni Ochyra (12 July 1936 – 26 May 1980) was a Polish fencer. He won a silver medal in the team sabre event at the 1960 Summer Olympics and a bronze in the same event at the 1964 Summer Olympics.
