= Claude Arabo =

French fencer (1937–2013)

Personal information
- Born: 3 October 1937 Nice, France
- Died: 2 July 2013 (aged 75)

Sport
- Sport: Fencing
Medal record
Men's fencing
Representing France
Olympic Games
Silver medal – second place	1964 Tokyo	Individual sabre
Mediterranean Games
Bronze medal – third place	1963 Naples	Individual sabre

Claude Arabo (3 October 1937 – 2 July 2013) was a French fencer. He won a bronze medal in the individual sabre event at the 1963 Mediterranean Games and a silver medal in the individual sabre event at the 1964 Summer Olympics.
