= Marcel Parent (fencer) =

French fencer (born 1934)

Personal information
- Born: 25 October 1934 (age 91) Paris, France

Sport
- Sport: Fencing
Medal record
Mediterranean Games
Silver medal – second place	1955 Barcelona	Team sabre

Marcel Parent (born 25 October 1934) is a French sabre fencer. He competed at the 1960, 1964 and 1968 Summer Olympics. He also competed at the 1955 Mediterranean Games where he won a silver medal in the team sabre event.
