= Fencing at the 1960 Summer Olympics – Men's épée =

Fencing at the Olympics

Men's épée at the Games of the XVII Olympiad
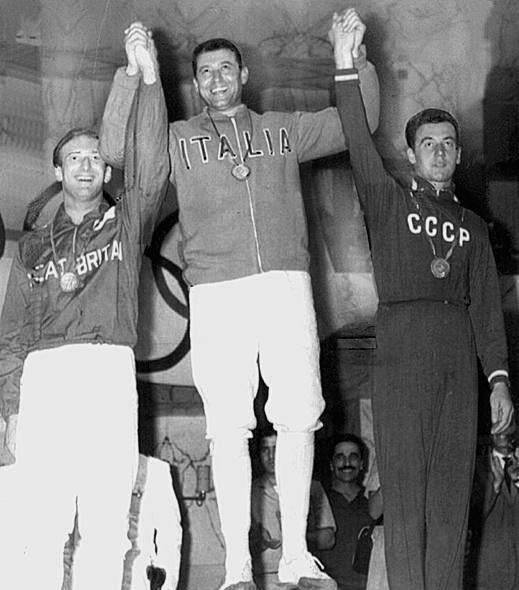
- Allan Jay, Giuseppe Delfino and Bruno Habārovs
- Venue: Palazzo dei Congressi
- Dates: 5–6 September
- Competitors: 79 from 32 nations

Medalists
1st place, gold medalist(s)		Giuseppe Delfino; Italy
2nd place, silver medalist(s)		Allan Jay; Great Britain
3rd place, bronze medalist(s)		Bruno Habārovs; Soviet Union

The men's épée was one of eight fencing events on the fencing at the 1960 Summer Olympics programme. It was the thirteenth appearance of the event. The competition was held from 5 to 6 September 1960. 79 fencers from 32 nations competed. Each nation was limited to three fencers. The event was won by Giuseppe Delfino of Italy, the nation's sixth consecutive victory in the men's épée (twice as many all-time as the nation with the next most, France with three). Delfino, who had taken silver in 1956, was the seventh man to win multiple medals in the event. Silver went to Allan Jay of Great Britain and bronze to Bruno Habārovs of the Soviet Union, the first-ever medal in the event for both nations. It was the first time during Italy's gold-medal streak that the nation did not have a second medalist as well.

== Background ==
This was the 13th appearance of the event, which was not held at the first Games in 1896 (with only foil and sabre events held) but has been held at every Summer Olympics since 1900.

Two of the eight finalists from the 1956 Games returned: silver medalist Giuseppe Delfino of Italy and eighth-place finisher Rolf Wiik of Finland. The other two members of Italy's 1956 medal-sweeping squad (gold medalist Carlo Pavesi and bronze medalist Edoardo Mangiarotti) competed in the team event, but not the individual. The reigning (1959) World Champion was Bruno Habārovs of the Soviet Union, with Allan Jay of Great Britain second and Giuseppe Delfino third. The previous World Champions, Armand Mouyal of France (1957) and Bill Hoskyns of Great Britain (1958), were also competing in Rome.

Lebanon, Monaco, Morocco, New Zealand, and Tunisia each made their debut in the event. Belgium and the United States each appeared for the 12th time, tied for most among nations.

== Competition format ==
The competition used a pool play format, with each fencer facing the other fencers in the pool in a round robin. There were significant changes from previous tournaments, however. The competition expanded to five rounds for the first time. Bouts were to 5 touches (an innovation retained from 1956), except that now (for the first time) ties were not permitted so that double-touches for the 5th and subsequent points resulted in the match continuing until one fencer won a point. Barrages were used to break ties necessary for advancement. However, only as much fencing was done as was necessary to determine advancement, so some bouts never occurred if the fencers advancing from the pool could be determined. Byes for team event finalists were eliminated; all fencers started in the first round. The competition involved 5 rounds:

- Round 1: 12 pools, 6 or 7 fencers to a pool, top 3 advance (total 36 advancing)
- Round 2: 6 pools, 6 fencers to a pool, top 4 advance (total 24 advancing)
- Quarterfinals: 4 pools, 6 fencers to a pool, top 3 advance (total 12 advancing)
- Semifinals: 2 pools, 6 fencers to a pool, top 4 advance (total 8 advancing)
- Final: 1 pool, 8 fencers

== Schedule ==
All times are Central European Time (UTC+1)

Date	Time	Round
Monday, 5 September 1960	8:30; 15:00	Round 1 Round 2
Tuesday, 6 September 1960	8:30; 13:00; 15:00	Quarterfinals; Semifinals; Final

== Results ==
=== Round 1 ===
The top three fencers in each pool advanced.

==== Round 1 Pool A ====
With Gonsior and Echeverry tied for 3rd place at 3–2, the two men fenced each other again for the right to advance. Echeverry had won the initial bout between the two in pool play, but Gonsior won the rematch 5–4 and advanced to the next round along with Guittet and Pickworth.

Pos	Fencer	W	L	TF	TA	Qual.	JG	BP	BG	EE	RB	CE
1	Jack Guittet (FRA)	4	1	23	10	Q		3–5	5–3	5–1	5–1	5–0
2	Brian Pickworth (NZL)	4	1	21	14	Q	5–3		1–5	5–2	5–3	5–1
3	Bohdan Gonsior (POL)	3	2	22	16	B	3–5	5–1		4–5	5–2	5–3
4	Emilio Echeverry (COL)	3	2	18	19	B	1–5	2–5	5–4		5–2	5–3
5	Raoul Barouch (TUN)	1	4	13	23		1–5	3–5	2–5	2–5		5–3
6	Charles El-Gressy (MAR)	0	5	10	25		0–5	1–5	3–5	3–5	3–5	

Source: Official Report, p. 790
Legend: Blue = left column team win; Yellow = draw; Red = top row team win.

Barrage

Pos	Fencer	W	L	TF	TA	Qual.	BG	EE
1	Bohdan Gonsior (POL)	1	0	5	4	Q		5–4
2	Emilio Echeverry (COL)	0	1	4	5		4–5	

Source: Official Report, p. 790
Legend: Blue = left column team win; Yellow = draw; Red = top row team win.

==== Round 1 Pool B ====
Vasin of Yugoslavia was entered in this pool, but did not start. The bout between Sákovics and Achten was cancelled as unnecessary.

Pos	Fencer	W	L	TF	TA	Qual.	JS	RA	JF	KC	HL	TVX
1	József Sákovics (HUN)	4	0	20	11	Q			5–4	5–2	5–4	5–1
2	Roger Achten (BEL)	4	0	20	11	Q			5–4	5–1	5–4	5–2
3	José Ferreira (POR)	3	2	23	19	Q	4–5	4–5		5–3	5–4	5–2
4	Kaj Czarnecki (FIN)	2	3	16	21		2–5	1–5	3–5		5–4	5–2
5	Hans Lagerwall (SWE)	1	4	21	21		4–5	4–5	4–5	4–5		5–1
6	Trần Văn Xuan (VIE)	0	5	8	25		1–5	2–5	2–5	2–5	1–5	

Source: Official Report, p. 791
Legend: Blue = left column team win; Yellow = draw; Red = top row team win.

==== Round 1 Pool C ====
Pos	Fencer	W	L	TF	TA	Qual.	KT	AP	DM	RM	GC	CP	AS
1	Kazuhiko Tabuchi (JPN)	5	1	26	23	Q		5–3	1–5	5–4	5–4	5–3	5–4
2	Alberto Pellegrino (ITA)	4	2	26	17	Q	3–5		3–5	5–1	5–0	5–3	5–3
3	David Micahnik (USA)	4	2	23	16	Q	5–1	5–3		5–2	2–5	1–5	5–0
4	Raúl Martínez (ARG)	3	3	22	19		4–5	1–5	2–5		5–1	5–2	5–1
5	George Carpenter (IRL)	3	3	20	23		4–5	0–5	5–2	1–5		5–4	5–2
6	Claudio Polledri (SUI)	2	4	22	24		3–5	3–5	5–1	2–5	4–5		5–3
7	Abderrahman Sebti (MAR)	0	6	13	30		4–5	3–5	0–5	1–5	2–5	3–5	

Source: Official Report, p. 791
Legend: Blue = left column team win; Yellow = draw; Red = top row team win.

==== Round 1 Pool D ====
The Kausz–Martínez and Saykali–Ramos bouts were cancelled; neither could affect qualification.

Pos	Fencer	W	L	TF	TA	Qual.	IK	GBB	JP	MS	BR	MM
1	István Kausz (HUN)	4	0	20	10	Q		5–2	5–3	5–3	5–2	
2	Giovanni Battista Breda (ITA)	3	2	19	12	Q	2–5		2–5	5–1	5–0	5–1
3	John Pelling (GBR)	3	2	20	16	Q	3–5	5–2		5–2	5–2	2–5
4	Michel Saykali (LIB)	1	3	11	18		3–5	1–5	2–5			5–3
5	Benito Ramos (MEX)	1	3	9	18		2–5	0–5	2–5			5–3
6	Manuel Martínez (ESP)	1	3	12	17			1–5	5–2	3–5	3–5	

Source: Official Report, p. 791
Legend: Blue = left column team win; Yellow = draw; Red = top row team win.

==== Round 1 Pool E ====
With a three-way tie for 3rd place, a barrage was conducted to assign the final advancement place. In the initial pool play, the three tied fencers had each gone 1–1 against the others (Dehez beat Spinella, who beat Pakarinen, who beat Dehez). In the barrage, Dehez again defeated Spinella, though it was a closer match the second time. Dehez then also beat Pakarinen to avenge his group loss. Because the two victories for Dehez ensured his qualification over the other two fencers, Spinella and Pakarinen did not face each other in the barrage.

Pos	Fencer	W	L	TF	TA	Qual.	GD	PG	FD	RS	KP	LK
1	Giuseppe Delfino (ITA)	5	0	25	9	Q		5–0	5–2	5–3	5–2	5–2
2	Paul Gnaier (EUA)	3	2	19	20	Q	0–5		5–3	4–5	5–3	5–4
3	François Dehez (BEL)	2	3	16	19	B	2–5	1–5		5–1	3–5	5–3
4	Ralph Spinella (USA)	2	3	16	23	B	3–5	5–4	1–5		5–4	2–5
5	Kalevi Pakarinen (FIN)	2	3	19	18	B	2–5	3–5	5–3	4–5		5–0
6	Leif Klette (NOR)	1	4	14	22		2–5	4–5	3–5	5–2	0–5	

Source: Official Report, p. 792
Legend: Blue = left column team win; Yellow = draw; Red = top row team win.

Barrage

Pos	Fencer	W	L	TF	TA	Qual.	FD	RS	KP
1	François Dehez (BEL)	2	0	10	6	Q		5–4	5–2
2	Ralph Spinella (USA)	0	1	4	5		4–5		
3	Kalevi Pakarinen (FIN)	0	1	2	5		2–5		

Source: Official Report, p. 792
Legend: Blue = left column team win; Yellow = draw; Red = top row team win.

==== Round 1 Pool F ====
Three bouts were cancelled as they would not affect qualification.

Pos	Fencer	W	L	TF	TA	Qual.	BH	JK	JAD	RS	AH	CB	JS
1	Bruno Habārovs (URS)	5	0	26	11	Q			6–5	5–2	5–1	5–1	5–2
2	Janusz Kurczab (POL)	4	1	22	17	Q			1–5	5–3	5–2	6–5	5–2
3	Jules Amez-Droz (SUI)	4	2	28	20	Q	5–6	5–1		5–3	5–2	3–5	5–3
4	Robert Schiel (LUX)	2	3	18	19		2–5	3–5	3–5			5–3	5–1
5	Abbes Harchi (MAR)	2	3	15	16		1–5	2–5	2–5			5–4	5–0
6	Christopher Bland (IRL)	1	4	18	24		1–5	5–6	5–3	3–5	4–5		
7	John Simpson (AUS)	0	5	8	25		2–5	2–5	3–5	1–5	0–5		

Source: Official Report, p. 792
Legend: Blue = left column team win; Yellow = draw; Red = top row team win.

==== Round 1 Pool G ====
There was a three-way tie for 2nd place, so a barrage was held to determine the two fencers who would advance along with the leader, Jay. Annabi lost each of the first two bouts of the barrage, making the third bout unnecessary.

Pos	Fencer	W	L	TF	TA	Qual.	AJ	DF	BOR	AA	AM	GO	JD
1	Allan Jay (GBR)	5	1	29	15	Q		5–1	6–5	3–5	5–2	5–1	5–1
2	Dieter Fänger (EUA)	4	2	25	16	B	1–5		4–5	5–4	5–0	5–2	5–0
3	Berndt-Otto Rehbinder (SWE)	4	2	24	17	B	5–6	5–4		5–0	1–5	3–0	5–2
4	Ali Annabi (TUN)	4	2	24	21	B	5–3	4–5	0–5		5–4	5–4	5–0
5	Abelardo Menéndez (CUB)	2	4	19	25		2–5	0–5	5–1	4–5		3–5	5–4
6	Gilbert Orengo (MON)	2	4	17	27		1–5	2–5	0–5	4–5	5–3		5–4
7	Jaime Duque (COL)	0	6	11	30		1–5	0–5	2–5	0–5	4–5	4–5	

Source: Official Report, p. 792
Legend: Blue = left column team win; Yellow = draw; Red = top row team win.

Barrage

Pos	Fencer	W	L	TF	TA	Qual.	DF	BOR	AA
1	Dieter Fänger (EUA)	1	0	5	2	Q			5–2
2	Berndt-Otto Rehbinder (SWE)	1	0	5	3	Q			5–3
3	Ali Annabi (TUN)	0	2	5	10		2–5	3–5	

Source: Official Report, p. 792
Legend: Blue = left column team win; Yellow = draw; Red = top row team win.

==== Round 1 Pool H ====
Gruber of Venezuela was entered in this pool but withdrew before competition began. After a three-way tie for 3rd place in the round-robin, a barrage was held. Neuber defeated both Dwinger and Fujimaki to guarantee his advancement; the latter two did not fence each other.

Pos	Fencer	W	L	TF	TA	Qual.	AC	JF	GN	MD	SF	HB
1	Arnold Chernushevich (URS)	5	0	25	9	Q		5–1	5–2	5–2	5–2	5–2
2	José Fernandes (POR)	4	1	21	13	Q	1–5		5–2	5–2	5–3	5–1
3	Georg Neuber (EUA)	2	3	19	19	B	2–5	2–5		5–6	5–1	5–2
4	Max Dwinger (NED)	2	3	18	21	B	2–5	2–5	6–5		3–5	5–1
5	Sonosuke Fujimaki (JPN)	2	3	16	19	B	2–5	3–5	1–5	5–3		5–1
6	Henri Bini (MON)	0	5	7	25		2–5	1–5	2–5	1–5	1–5	

Source: Official Report, p. 793
Legend: Blue = left column team win; Yellow = draw; Red = top row team win.

Barrage

Pos	Fencer	W	L	TF	TA	Qual.	GN	MD	SF
1	Georg Neuber (EUA)	2	0	10	8	Q		5–4	5–4
2	Max Dwinger (NED)	0	1	4	5		4–5		
3	Sonosuke Fujimaki (JPN)	0	1	4	5		4–5		

Source: Official Report, p. 793
Legend: Blue = left column team win; Yellow = draw; Red = top row team win.

==== Round 1 Pool I ====
The Kostava–Wiik bout was cancelled as unnecessary; both fencers would advance regardless of the result. Similarly, the Ramadan–Roldán and Soeratman–Díez bouts would not have given any of those fencers enough wins to reach 3rd place and were cancelled.

Pos	Fencer	W	L	TF	TA	Qual.	AB	GK	RW	MR	AR	AS	JD
1	Alberto Balestrini (ARG)	6	0	30	16	Q		5–3	5–2	5–2	5–4	5–1	5–4
2	Guram Kostava (URS)	4	1	23	14	Q	3–5			5–3	5–2	5–0	5–4
3	Rolf Wiik (FIN)	4	1	22	13	Q	2–5			5–2	5–3	5–0	5–3
4	Mohamed Ramadan (LIB)	2	3	17	20		2–5	3–5	2–5			5–2	5–3
5	Ángel Roldán (MEX)	1	4	16	24		4–5	2–5	3–5			2–5	5–4
6	Andreas Soeratman (INA)	1	4	8	22		1–5	0–5	0–5	2–5	5–2		
7	Jesús Díez (ESP)	0	5	18	25		4–5	4–5	3–5	3–5	4–5		

Source: Official Report, p. 793
Legend: Blue = left column team win; Yellow = draw; Red = top row team win.

==== Round 1 Pool J ====
Glos and Margolis tied for 3rd and fenced off; Margolis had won the initial bout, but Glos was the victor in the barrage and earned advancement to the next round.

Pos	Fencer	W	L	TF	TA	Qual.	AG	EG	WG	JM	NB	TO	JdA
1	Adalbert Gurath Jr. (ROU)	5	1	27	15	Q		5–3	2–5	5–1	5–1	5–2	5–3
2	Eddi Gutenkauf (LUX)	5	1	28	19	Q	3–5		5–3	5–4	5–2	5–4	5–1
3	Wiesław Glos (POL)	4	2	24	14	B	5–2	3–5		1–5	5–1	5–0	5–1
4	James Margolis (USA)	4	2	25	18	B	1–5	4–5	5–1		5–2	5–2	5–3
5	Norbert Brami (TUN)	1	5	13	28		1–5	2–5	1–5	2–5		2–5	5–3
6	Tsugeo Ozawa (JPN)	1	5	13	28		2–5	4–5	0–5	2–5	5–3		0–5
7	José de Albuquerque (POR)	1	5	16	25		3–5	1–5	1–5	3–5	3–5	5–0	

Source: Official Report, p. 793
Legend: Blue = left column team win; Yellow = draw; Red = top row team win.

Barrage

Pos	Fencer	W	L	TF	TA	Qual.	WG	JM
1	Wiesław Glos (POL)	1	0	5	3	Q		5–3
2	James Margolis (USA)	0	1	3	5		3–5	

Source: Official Report, p. 793
Legend: Blue = left column team win; Yellow = draw; Red = top row team win.

==== Round 1 Pool K ====
There was a three-way tie for 3rd, requiring a barrage. Hoskyns won the first two bouts against Theisen and Stone, making the third bout between those two fencers irrelevant.

Pos	Fencer	W	L	TF	TA	Qual.	YD	IO	BH	RT	RS	MS	PC
1	Yves Dreyfus (FRA)	5	1	32	22	Q		5–3	5–3	5–2	7–6	5–6	5–2
2	Ibrahim Osman (LIB)	4	2	26	25	Q	3–5		3–5	5–4	5–3	5–4	5–4
3	Bill Hoskyns (GBR)	3	3	23	23	B	3–5	5–3		5–3	3–5	2–5	5–2
4	Roger Theisen (LUX)	3	3	24	25	B	2–5	4–5	3–5		5–3	5–4	5–3
5	Richard Stone (AUS)	3	3	28	27	B	6–7	3–5	5–3	3–5		6–5	5–2
6	Michel Steininger (SUI)	2	4	24	28		6–5	4–5	5–2	4–5	5–6		3–5
7	Pedro Cabrera (ESP)	1	5	18	28		2–5	4–5	2–5	3–5	2–5	5–3	

Source: Official Report, p. 794
Legend: Blue = left column team win; Yellow = draw; Red = top row team win.

Barrage

Pos	Fencer	W	L	TF	TA	Qual.	BH	RT	RS
1	Bill Hoskyns (GBR)	2	0	10	6	Q		5–3	5–3
2	Roger Theisen (LUX)	0	1	3	5		3–5		
3	Richard Stone (AUS)	0	1	3	5		3–5		

Source: Official Report, p. 794
Legend: Blue = left column team win; Yellow = draw; Red = top row team win.

==== Round 1 Pool L ====
Abrahamsson and Almada tied for 3rd and fenced off; Abrahamsson repeated his round-robin victory over Almada to advance to the next round. The bout between Mouyal and Gábor was cancelled as unnecessary.

Pos	Fencer	W	L	TF	TA	Qual.	AM	TG	GA	AA	RVDD	KH	TK
1	Armand Mouyal (FRA)	5	0	26	10	Q			5–2	6–5	5–1	5–1	5–1
2	Tamás Gábor (HUN)	4	1	22	17	Q			5–4	2–5	5–3	5–2	5–3
3	Göran Abrahamsson (SWE)	3	3	25	24	B	2–5	4–5		5–4	5–2	4–5	5–3
4	Antonio Almada (MEX)	3	3	26	23	B	5–6	5–2	4–5		2–5	5–4	5–1
5	René Van Den Driessche (BEL)	2	4	19	26		1–5	3–5	2–5	5–2		3–5	5–4
6	Keith Hackshall (AUS)	2	4	21	27		1–5	2–5	5–4	4–5	5–3		4–5
7	Tom Kearney (IRL)	1	5	17	29		1–5	3–5	3–5	1–5	4–5	5–4	

Source: Official Report, p. 794
Legend: Blue = left column team win; Yellow = draw; Red = top row team win.

Barrage

Pos	Fencer	W	L	TF	TA	Qual.	GA	AA
1	Göran Abrahamsson (SWE)	1	0	5	3	Q		5–3
2	Antonio Almada (MEX)	0	1	3	5		3–5	

Source: Official Report, p. 794
Legend: Blue = left column team win; Yellow = draw; Red = top row team win.

=== Round 2 ===
The top four fencers in each pool advanced.

==== Round 2 Pool A ====
The Guittet–Breda bout was unnecessary and not fenced.

Pos	Fencer	W	L	TF	TA	Qual.	GN	JG	GBB	AJ	JF	DM
1	Georg Neuber (EUA)	4	1	23	15	Q		5–3	3–5	5–1	5–4	5–2
2	Jack Guittet (FRA)	3	1	18	10	Q	3–5			5–3	5–1	5–1
3	Giovanni Battista Breda (ITA)	3	1	18	11	Q	5–3			5–1	3–5	5–2
4	Allan Jay (GBR)	2	3	15	19	Q	1–5	3–5	1–5		5–1	5–3
5	José Ferreira (POR)	1	4	16	24		4–5	1–5	5–3	1–5		5–6
6	David Micahnik (USA)	1	4	14	25		2–5	1–5	2–5	3–5	6–5	

Source: Official Report, p. 795
Legend: Blue = left column team win; Yellow = draw; Red = top row team win.

==== Round 2 Pool B ====
Two bouts (Sákovics–Glos and Pellegrino–Pickworth) were cancelled as unnecessary to determine advancement.

Pos	Fencer	W	L	TF	TA	Qual.	JS	AP	WG	RA	AB	BP
1	József Sákovics (HUN)	4	0	21	13	Q		5–4		6–5	5–3	5–1
2	Alberto Pellegrino (ITA)	3	1	19	12	Q	4–5		5–3	5–3	5–1	
3	Wiesław Glos (POL)	3	1	18	11	Q		3–5		5–0	5–3	5–3
4	Roger Achten (BEL)	2	3	18	22	Q	5–6	3–5	0–5		5–3	5–3
5	Alberto Balestrini (ARG)	1	4	15	21		3–5	1–5	3–5	3–5		5–1
6	Brian Pickworth (NZL)	0	4	8	20		1–5		3–5	3–5	1–5	

Source: Official Report, p. 795
Legend: Blue = left column team win; Yellow = draw; Red = top row team win.

==== Round 2 Pool C ====
Two bouts (Abrahamsson–Kostava and Delfino–Dehez) were cancelled as unnecessary for determining advancement.

Pos	Fencer	W	L	TF	TA	Qual.	DF	GA	GD	GK	KT	FD
1	Dieter Fänger (EUA)	4	1	26	22	Q		3–5	5–1	7–6	6–5	5–3
2	Göran Abrahamsson (SWE)	3	1	17	12	Q	5–3		2–5		5–3	5–1
3	Giuseppe Delfino (ITA)	3	1	16	13	Q	1–5	5–2		5–4	5–2	
4	Guram Kostava (URS)	2	2	20	19	Q	6–7		4–5		5–3	5–4
5	Kazuhiko Tabuchi (JPN)	1	4	18	22		5–6	3–5	2–5	3–5		5–1
6	François Dehez (BEL)	0	4	9	20		3–5	1–5		4–5	1–5	

Source: Official Report, p. 795
Legend: Blue = left column team win; Yellow = draw; Red = top row team win.

==== Round 2 Pool D ====
The Rehbinder–Fernandes bout was cancelled as unnecessary for determining advancement. Dreyfus and Wiik each finished at 2–3; the Official Report does not mention a barrage or how the tie between the two for 4th place was otherwise broken.

Pos	Fencer	W	L	TF	TA	Qual.	BOR	AC	TG	YD	RW	JF
1	Berndt-Otto Rehbinder (SWE)	4	0	20	13	Q		5–4	5–3	5–2	5–4	
2	Arnold Chernushevich (URS)	3	2	22	19	Q	4–5		5–4	5–4	3–5	5–1
3	Tamás Gábor (HUN)	3	2	24	22	Q	3–5	4–5		5–4	7–6	5–2
4	Yves Dreyfus (FRA)	2	3	20	20	Q	2–5	4–5	4–5		5–3	5–2
5	Rolf Wiik (FIN)	2	3	23	23		4–5	5–3	6–7	3–5		5–3
6	José Fernandes (POR)	0	4	8	20			1–5	2–5	2–5	3–5	

Source: Official Report, p. 797
Legend: Blue = left column team win; Yellow = draw; Red = top row team win.

==== Round 2 Pool E ====
The Habārovs–Gnaier and Pelling–Gutenkauf bouts were cancelled as unnecessary for determining advancement.

Pos	Fencer	W	L	TF	TA	Qual.	IK	BH	PG	BG	JP	EG
1	István Kausz (HUN)	3	2	22	12	Q		3–5	4–5	5–1	5–1	5–0
2	Bruno Habārovs (URS)	3	1	19	15	Q	5–3			6–5	3–5	5–2
3	Paul Gnaier (EUA)	3	1	16	14	Q	5–4			1–5	5–2	5–3
4	Bohdan Gonsior (POL)	3	2	21	17	Q	1–5	5–6	5–1		5–1	5–4
5	John Pelling (GBR)	1	3	9	18		1–5	5–3	2–5	1–5		
6	Eddi Gutenkauf (LUX)	0	4	9	20		0–5	2–5	3–5	4–5		

Source: Official Report, p. 797
Legend: Blue = left column team win; Yellow = draw; Red = top row team win.

==== Round 2 Pool F ====
Amez-Droz and Mouyal tied for 4th at 2–3 and fenced off in a barrage for advancement. Mouyal, who had won the round-robin bout against Amez-Droz, won again in the barrage.

Pos	Fencer	W	L	TF	TA	Qual.	JK	AG	BH	AM	JAD	IO
1	Janusz Kurczab (POL)	4	1	20	11	Q		0–5	5–0	5–1	5–2	5–3
2	Adalbert Gurath Jr. (ROU)	3	2	20	17	Q	5–0		0–5	5–2	6–5	4–5
3	Bill Hoskyns (GBR)	3	2	20	18	Q	0–5	5–0		6–5	4–5	5–3
4	Armand Mouyal (FRA)	2	3	18	21	B	1–5	2–5	5–6		5–3	5–2
5	Jules Amez-Droz (SUI)	2	3	20	23	B	2–5	5–6	5–4	3–5		5–3
6	Ibrahim Osman (LIB)	1	4	16	24		3–5	5–4	3–5	2–5	3–5	

Source: Official Report, p. 797
Legend: Blue = left column team win; Yellow = draw; Red = top row team win.

Barrage

Pos	Fencer	W	L	TF	TA	Qual.	AM	JAD
1	Armand Mouyal (FRA)	1	0	5	3	Q		5–3
2	Jules Amez-Droz (SUI)	0	1	3	5		3–5	

Source: Official Report, p. 797
Legend: Blue = left column team win; Yellow = draw; Red = top row team win.

=== Quarterfinals ===
The top three fencers in each pool advanced.

==== Quarterfinal A ====
There was a three-way tie for 2nd place, resulting in a barrage for the 2 available advancement spots. Kurczab lost both of the first two bouts, rendering the third bout (between Habārovs and Jay) unnecessary.

Pos	Fencer	W	L	TF	TA	Qual.	GBB	BH	AJ	JK	TG	GA
1	Giovanni Battista Breda (ITA)	4	1	25	20	Q		6–5	4–5	5–2	5–4	5–4
2	Bruno Habārovs (URS)	3	2	24	24	B	5–6		6–5	2–5	6–5	5–3
3	Allan Jay (GBR)	3	2	21	21	B	5–4	5–6		5–3	5–3	1–5
4	Janusz Kurczab (POL)	3	2	20	18	B	2–5	5–2	3–5		5–2	5–4
5	Tamás Gábor (HUN)	1	4	19	23		4–5	5–6	3–5	2–5		5–2
6	Göran Abrahamsson (SWE)	1	4	18	21		4–5	3–5	5–1	4–5	2–5	

Source: Official Report, p. 799
Legend: Blue = left column team win; Yellow = draw; Red = top row team win.

Barrage

Pos	Fencer	W	L	TF	TA	Qual.	BH	AJ	JK
1	Bruno Habārovs (URS)	1	0	5	1	Q			5–1
2	Allan Jay (GBR)	1	0	5	0	Q			5–0
3	Janusz Kurczab (POL)	0	2	1	10		1–5	0–5	

Source: Official Report, p. 799
Legend: Blue = left column team win; Yellow = draw; Red = top row team win.

==== Quarterfinal B ====
The Dreyfus–Kostava bout was cancelled as unnecessary to determining advancement.

Pos	Fencer	W	L	TF	TA	Qual.	AP	YD	GK	BG	GN	BH
1	Alberto Pellegrino (ITA)	4	1	24	14	Q		5–3	5–1	5–2	4–5	5–3
2	Yves Dreyfus (FRA)	3	1	18	10	Q	3–5			5–1	5–3	5–1
3	Guram Kostava (URS)	3	1	16	16	Q	1–5			5–3	5–4	5–4
4	Bohdan Gonsior (POL)	2	3	16	19		2–5	1–5	3–5		5–2	5–2
5	Georg Neuber (EUA)	2	3	19	22		5–4	3–5	4–5	2–5		5–3
6	Bill Hoskyns (GBR)	0	5	13	25		3–5	1–5	4–5	2–5	3–5	

Source: Official Report, p. 799
Legend: Blue = left column team win; Yellow = draw; Red = top row team win.

==== Quarterfinal C ====
The Glos–Guittet bout was cancelled as unnecessary to determining advancement.

Pos	Fencer	W	L	TF	TA	Qual.	GD	IK	BOR	PG	WG	JG
1	Giuseppe Delfino (ITA)	5	0	25	13	Q		5–1	5–4	5–1	5–4	5–3
2	István Kausz (HUN)	3	2	19	20	Q	1–5		5–3	3–5	5–4	5–3
3	Berndt-Otto Rehbinder (SWE)	3	2	23	20	Q	4–5	3–5		5–1	6–5	5–4
4	Paul Gnaier (EUA)	2	3	16	20		1–5	5–3	1–5		4–5	5–2
5	Wiesław Glos (POL)	1	3	18	20		4–5	4–5	5–6	5–4		
6	Jack Guittet (FRA)	0	4	12	20		3–5	3–5	4–5	2–5		

Source: Official Report, p. 799
Legend: Blue = left column team win; Yellow = draw; Red = top row team win.

==== Quarterfinal D ====
There was a four-way tie for 1st place, so a barrage was needed between those four fencers to determine the three who would advance. Chernushevich lost to all three of the other fencers, making him the one from the barrage not to advance.

Pos	Fencer	W	L	TF	TA	Qual.	AM	RA	JS	AC	AG	DF
1	Armand Mouyal (FRA)	3	2	24	22	B		6–5	5–3	5–6	5–3	3–5
2	Roger Achten (BEL)	3	2	23	21	B	5–6		3–5	5–3	5–3	5–4
3	József Sákovics (HUN)	3	2	22	20	B	3–5	5–3		5–4	4–5	5–3
4	Arnold Chernushevich (URS)	3	2	25	25	B	6–5	3–5	4–5		6–5	6–5
5	Adalbert Gurath Jr. (ROU)	2	3	21	23		3–5	3–5	5–4	5–6		5–3
6	Dieter Fänger (EUA)	1	4	20	24		5–3	4–5	3–5	5–6	3–5	

Source: Official Report, p. 800
Legend: Blue = left column team win; Yellow = draw; Red = top row team win.

Barrage

Pos	Fencer	W	L	TF	TA	Qual.	AM	RA	JS	AC
1	Armand Mouyal (FRA)	2	1	15	10	Q		5–6	5–4	5–0
2	Roger Achten (BEL)	2	0	11	8	Q	6–5			5–3
3	József Sákovics (HUN)	1	1	9	9	Q	4–5			5–4
4	Arnold Chernushevich (URS)	0	3	7	15		0–5	3–5	4–5	

Source: Official Report, p. 800
Legend: Blue = left column team win; Yellow = draw; Red = top row team win.

=== Semifinals ===
The top four fencers in each pool advanced.

==== Semifinal A ====
Achten and Pellegrino tied at 2–3 and had to fence-off. Pellegrino had won the round-robin bout, but Achten won the barrage.

Pos	Fencer	W	L	TF	TA	Qual.	AJ	BH	AM	RA	AP	IK
1	Allan Jay (GBR)	4	1	23	12	Q		3–5	5–1	5–1	5–4	5–1
2	Bruno Habārovs (URS)	3	2	18	21	Q	5–3		5–4	2–5	1–5	5–4
3	Armand Mouyal (FRA)	3	2	21	21	Q	1–5	4–5		6–5	5–3	5–3
4	Roger Achten (BEL)	2	3	19	21	B	1–5	5–2	5–6		3–5	5–3
5	Alberto Pellegrino (ITA)	2	3	21	19	B	4–5	5–1	3–5	5–3		4–5
6	István Kausz (HUN)	1	4	16	24		1–5	4–5	3–5	3–5	5–4	

Source: Official Report, p. 801
Legend: Blue = left column team win; Yellow = draw; Red = top row team win.

Barrage

Pos	Fencer	W	L	TF	TA	Qual.	RA	AP
1	Roger Achten (BEL)	1	0	5	4	Q		5–4
2	Alberto Pellegrino (ITA)	0	1	4	5		4–5	

Source: Official Report, p. 801
Legend: Blue = left column team win; Yellow = draw; Red = top row team win.

==== Semifinal B ====
There was a three-way tie for 4th place, necessitating a barrage for the last advancement place. When the three fencers again tied at 1–1, they were ranked by fewest touches received, giving Breda the victory within the barrage.

Pos	Fencer	W	L	TF	TA	Qual.	JS	YD	GD	GBB	GK	BOR
1	József Sákovics (HUN)	3	2	23	18	Q		4–5	5–2	5–3	4–5	5–3
2	Yves Dreyfus (FRA)	3	2	21	23	Q	5–4		6–5	0–5	5–3	5–6
3	Giuseppe Delfino (ITA)	3	2	24	25	Q	2–5	5–6		5–4	6–5	6–5
4	Giovanni Battista Breda (ITA)	2	3	19	18	B	3–5	5–0	4–5		5–3	2–5
5	Guram Kostava (URS)	2	3	21	23	B	5–4	3–5	5–6	3–5		5–3
6	Berndt-Otto Rehbinder (SWE)	2	3	22	23	B	3–5	6–5	5–6	5–2	3–5	

Source: Official Report, p. 801
Legend: Blue = left column team win; Yellow = draw; Red = top row team win.

Barrage

Pos	Fencer	W	L	TF	TA	Qual.	GBB	GK	BOR
1	Giovanni Battista Breda (ITA)	1	1	9	6	Q		5–1	4–5
2	Guram Kostava (URS)	1	1	6	7		1–5		5–2
3	Berndt-Otto Rehbinder (SWE)	1	1	7	9		5–4	2–5	

Source: Official Report, p. 801
Legend: Blue = left column team win; Yellow = draw; Red = top row team win.

=== Final ===
The final pool resulted in 3 sets of ties: Delfino and Jay at 5–2 for gold and silver, Habārovs and Sákovics at 4–3 for bronze and 4th place, and Achten, Dreyfus, and Mouyal at 3–4 for 5th through 7th place. The medal ties were broken via barrage. Delfino, who had defeated Jay 6–5 in the round-robin, defeated him again 5–2 in the barrage to take the gold medal. Both bouts between Habārovs and Sákovics went past five touches due to double-hits; Sákovics won in the round-robin 7–6, but Habārovs prevailed in the barrage 8–7.

The three-way tie for 5th, 6th, and 7th places was broken not by a barrage, but by tie-breakers within the round-robin results. The fencer with the fewest touches received in victories was ranked best; this was Achten (to take 5th place), whose wins had been 5–1, 5–3, and 5–4 (8 touches received). Dreyfus and Mouyal each had received 9 touches in their victories (Dreyfus won by 6–5, 5–1, and 5–3 scores; all three of Mouyal's victories were 5–3). The next tie-breaker was touches given in losses. Dreyfus here prevailed, taking 6th place; he had scored 2, 5, 4, and 3 touches (14 total) in his losses, while Mouyal had given 5, 2, 2, and 1 (10 total) in his.

Pos	Fencer	W	L	TF	TA	Qual.	GD	AJ	BH	JS	RA	YD	AM	GBB
1	Giuseppe Delfino (ITA)	5	2	39	32	GB		6–5	5–2	5–6	7–6	5–6	6–5	5–2
2	Allan Jay (GBR)	5	2	32	23	GB	5–6		2–5	5–2	5–4	5–2	5–2	5–2
3	Bruno Habārovs (URS)	4	3	32	31	BB	2–5	5–2		6–7	5–4	6–5	3–5	5–3
4	József Sákovics (HUN)	4	3	32	30	BB	6–5	2–5	7–6		5–2	3–5	5–2	4–5
5	Roger Achten (BEL)	3	4	31	30		6–7	4–5	4–5	2–5		5–4	5–1	5–3
6	Yves Dreyfus (FRA)	3	4	30	30		6–5	2–5	5–6	5–3	4–5		3–5	5–1
7	Armand Mouyal (FRA)	3	4	25	30		5–6	2–5	5–3	2–5	1–5	5–3		5–3
8	Giovanni Battista Breda (ITA)	1	6	19	34		2–5	2–5	3–5	5–4	3–5	1–5	3–5	

Source: Official Report, p. 803
Legend: Blue = left column team win; Yellow = draw; Red = top row team win.

Barrages for gold and bronze

Pos	Fencer	W	L	TF	TA	GD	AJ	BH	JS
1st place, gold medalist(s)	Giuseppe Delfino (ITA)	1	0	5	2		5–2		
2nd place, silver medalist(s)	Allan Jay (GBR)	0	1	2	5	2–5			
3rd place, bronze medalist(s)	Bruno Habārovs (URS)	1	0	8	7				8–7
4	József Sákovics (HUN)	0	1	7	8			7–8	

Source: Official Report, p. 803
Legend: Blue = left column team win; Yellow = draw; Red = top row team win.

== Overall standings ==
Rank	Fencer	Nation	Round 1	Round 2	Quarterfinals	Semifinals	Final
1st place, gold medalist(s)	Giuseppe Delfino	Italy	1	3	1	3	1
2nd place, silver medalist(s)	Allan Jay	Great Britain	1	4	3	1	2
3rd place, bronze medalist(s)	Bruno Habārovs	Soviet Union	1	2	2	2	3
4	József Sákovics	Hungary	1	1	3	1	4
5	Roger Achten	Belgium	2	4	2	4	5
6	Yves Dreyfus	France	1	4	2	2	6
7	Armand Mouyal	France	1	4	1	3	7
8	Giovanni Battista Breda	Italy	2	3	1	4	8
9	Alberto Pellegrino	Italy	2	2	1	5	Did not advance
9	Guram Kostava	Soviet Union	2	4	3	5	Did not advance
11	István Kausz	Hungary	1	1	2	6	Did not advance
11	Berndt-Otto Rehbinder	Sweden	3	1	3	6	Did not advance
13	Janusz Kurczab	Poland	2	1	4	did not advance	
13	Bohdan Gonsior	Poland	3	4	4	did not advance	
13	Paul Gnaier	United Team of Germany	2	3	4	did not advance	
13	Arnold Chernushevich	Soviet Union	1	2	4	did not advance	
17	Tamás Gábor	Hungary	2	3	5	did not advance	
17	Georg Neuber	United Team of Germany	3	1	5	did not advance	
17	Wiesław Glos	Poland	3	3	5	did not advance	
17	Adalbert Gurath Jr.	Romania	1	2	5	did not advance	
21	Göran Abrahamsson	Sweden	3	2	6	did not advance	
21	Bill Hoskyns	Great Britain	3	3	6	did not advance	
21	Jack Guittet	France	1	2	6	did not advance	
21	Dieter Fänger	United Team of Germany	2	1	6	did not advance	
25	José Ferreira	Portugal	3	5	did not advance		
25	Alberto Balestrini	Argentina	1	5	did not advance		
25	Kazuhiko Tabuchi	Japan	1	5	did not advance		
25	Rolf Wiik	Finland	3	5	did not advance		
25	John Pelling	Great Britain	3	5	did not advance		
25	Jules Amez-Droz	Switzerland	3	5	did not advance		
31	David Micahnik	United States	3	6	did not advance		
31	Brian Pickworth	New Zealand	2	6	did not advance		
31	François Dehez	Belgium	3	6	did not advance		
31	José Fernandes	Portugal	2	6	did not advance		
31	Eddi Gutenkauf	Luxembourg	2	6	did not advance		
31	Ibrahim Osman	Lebanon	2	6	did not advance		
37	Emilio Echeverry	Colombia	4	did not advance			
37	Kaj Czarnecki	Finland	4	did not advance			
37	Raúl Martínez	Argentina	4	did not advance			
37	Michel Saykali	Lebanon	4	did not advance			
37	Ralph Spinella	United States	4	did not advance			
37	Robert Schiel	Luxembourg	4	did not advance			
37	Ali Annabi	Tunisia	4	did not advance			
37	Max Dwinger	Netherlands	4	did not advance			
37	Mohamed Ramadan	Lebanon	4	did not advance			
37	James Margolis	United States	4	did not advance			
37	Roger Theisen	Luxembourg	4	did not advance			
37	Antonio Almada	Mexico	4	did not advance			
49	Raoul Barouch	Tunisia	5	did not advance			
49	Hans Lagerwall	Sweden	5	did not advance			
49	George Carpenter	Ireland	5	did not advance			
49	Benito Ramos	Mexico	5	did not advance			
49	Kalevi Pakarinen	Finland	5	did not advance			
49	Abbes Harchi	Morocco	5	did not advance			
49	Abelardo Menéndez	Cuba	5	did not advance			
49	Sonosuke Fujimaki	Japan	5	did not advance			
49	Ángel Roldán	Mexico	5	did not advance			
49	Norbert Brami	Tunisia	5	did not advance			
49	Richard Stone	Australia	5	did not advance			
49	René Van Den Driessche	Belgium	5	did not advance			
61	Charles El-Gressy	Morocco	6	did not advance			
61	Trần Văn Xuan	Vietnam	6	did not advance			
61	Claudio Polledri	Switzerland	6	did not advance			
61	Manuel Martínez	Spain	6	did not advance			
61	Leif Klette	Norway	6	did not advance			
61	Christopher Bland	Ireland	6	did not advance			
61	Gilbert Orengo	Monaco	6	did not advance			
61	Henri Bini	Monaco	6	did not advance			
61	Andreas Soeratman	Indonesia	6	did not advance			
61	Tsugeo Ozawa	Japan	6	did not advance			
61	Michel Steininger	Switzerland	6	did not advance			
61	Keith Hackshall	Australia	6	did not advance			
73	Abderrahman Sebti	Morocco	7	did not advance			
73	John Simpson	Australia	7	did not advance			
73	Jaime Duque	Colombia	7	did not advance			
73	Jesús Díez	Spain	7	did not advance			
73	José de Albuquerque	Portugal	7	did not advance			
73	Pedro Cabrera	Spain	7	did not advance			
73	Tom Kearney	Ireland	7	did not advance			
