= Fencing at the 1960 Summer Olympics – Men's team épée =

Men's team épée at the Games of the XVII Olympiad
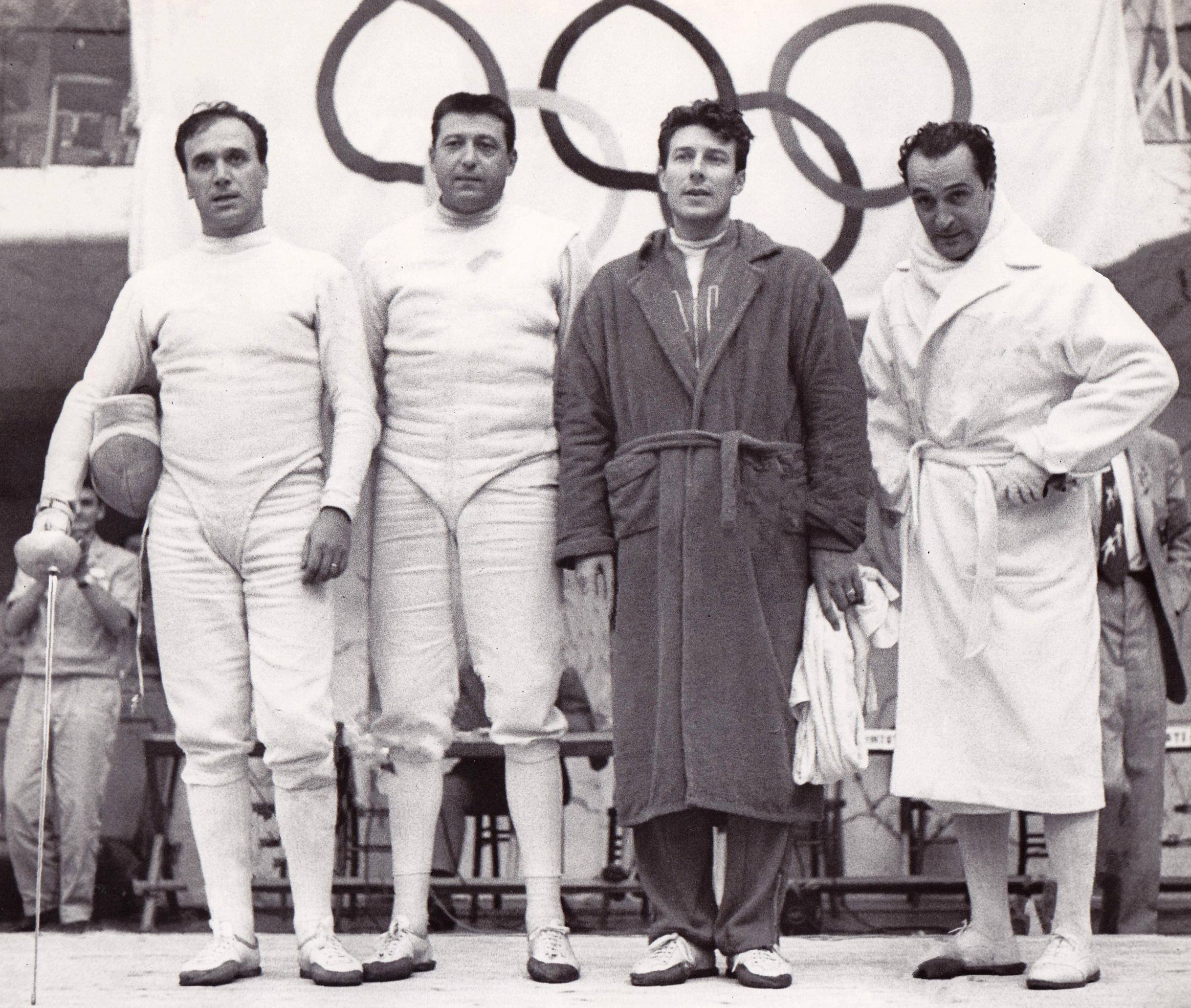
- Carlo Pavesi, Giuseppe Delfino, Alberto Pellegrino and Edoardo Mangiarotti
- Venue: Palazzo dei Congressi
- Dates: 9 September
- Competitors: 105 from 21 nations

Medalists
1st place, gold medalist(s)		Edoardo Mangiarotti; Giuseppe Delfino; Carlo Pavesi; Alberto Pellegrino; Fiorenzo Marini; Gianluigi Saccaro	Italy
2nd place, silver medalist(s)		Allan Jay; Michael Howard; John Pelling; Bill Hoskyns; Raymond Harrison; Michael Alexander	Great Britain
3rd place, bronze medalist(s)		Guram Kostava; Bruno Habārovs; Arnold Chernushevich; Valentin Chernikov; Aleksandr Pavlovsky	Soviet Union

The men's team épée was one of eight fencing events on the fencing at the 1960 Summer Olympics programme. It was the eleventh appearance of the event. The competition was held on 9 September 1960. 105 fencers from 21 nations competed.

== Competition format ==
The competition combined pool play with knockout rounds, a change from prior tournaments which used pool play all the way through. The first round consisted of pools, with the 21 teams entered in the competition divided into 7 pools of 3 teams. The top 2 teams in each pool after a round-robin advanced. The 14 teams remaining after the pool play competed in a four-round single-elimination bracket, with a bronze medal match between the semifinal losers. The winners of the first 2 pools received byes in the round of 16.

Each team match consisted of each of the four fencers on one team facing each fencer on the other team, for a maximum of 16 total bouts. An 8–8 tie would be resolved by touches received in victories. Bouts were to 5 touches (except that bouts would continue until there was a winner and would not end on a double-touch). Only as much fencing was done as was necessary to determine pool placement (in the first round) or the winning team (in the knockout rounds), so not all matches went to the full 16 bouts but instead stopped early (typically when one team had 9 bouts won).

== Rosters ==
Australia

- Ivan Lund
- Richard Stone
- John Humphreys
- John Simpson
- Keith Hackshall

Belgium

- Pierre Francisse
- René Van Den Driessche
- Jacques Debeur
- Roger Achten
- François Dehez

Finland

- Kaj Czarnecki
- Kurt Lindeman
- Rolf Wiik
- Kalevi Pakarinen

France

- Armand Mouyal
- Yves Dreyfus
- Claude Brodin
- Christian d'Oriola
- Jack Guittet
- Gérard Lefranc

Germany

- Paul Gnaier
- Fritz Zimmermann
- Dieter Fänger
- Georg Neuber
- Helmut Anschütz
- Walter Köstner

Great Britain

- Allan Jay
- Michael Howard
- John Pelling
- Bill Hoskyns
- Raymond Harrison
- Michael Alexander

Hungary

- József Marosi
- Tamás Gábor
- István Kausz
- József Sákovics
- Árpád Bárány

Ireland

- George Carpenter
- Christopher Bland
- Brian Hamilton
- Tom Kearney

Italy

- Edoardo Mangiarotti
- Giuseppe Delfino
- Carlo Pavesi
- Alberto Pellegrino
- Fiorenzo Marini
- Gianluigi Saccaro

Japan

- Heizaburo Okawa
- Tsugeo Ozawa
- Sonosuke Fujimaki
- Kazuhiko Tabuchi

Lebanon

- Ibrahim Osman
- Mohamed Ramadan
- Michel Saykali
- Hassan El-Said

Luxembourg

- Roger Theisen
- Edy Schmit
- Robert Schiel
- Rudy Kugeler
- Eddi Gutenkauf

Mexico

- Benito Ramos
- Ángel Roldán
- Antonio Almada
- Sergio Escobedo
- José Pérez

Morocco

- Abbes Harchi
- Abderrahman Sebti
- Charles Ben Itah
- Abderraouf El-Fassy
- Mohamed Ben Joullon

Poland

- Bohdan Gonsior
- Jerzy Strzałka
- Wiesław Glos
- Janusz Kurczab
- Andrzej Kryński

Portugal

- José Ferreira
- Manuel Borrego
- José Fernandes
- José de Albuquerque

Soviet Union

- Guram Kostava
- Bruno Habārovs
- Arnold Chernushevich
- Valentin Chernikov
- Aleksandr Pavlovsky

Spain

- Pedro Cabrera
- Manuel Martínez
- Jesús Díez
- Joaquín Moya

Sweden

- Hans Lagerwall
- Göran Abrahamsson
- Ulf Ling-Vannérus
- Berndt-Otto Rehbinder
- Carl-Wilhelm Engdahl
- Orvar Lindwall

Switzerland

- Hans Bässler
- Jules Amez-Droz
- Paul Meister
- Charles Ribordy
- Claudio Polledri
- Michel Steininger

United States

- James Margolis
- Roland Wommack
- David Micahnik
- Henry Kolowrat Jr.
- Ralph Spinella

== Results ==
=== Round 1 ===
==== Pool A ====
The United States defeated Portugal, as did Italy. This eliminated Portugal; the United States and Italy faced off to determine their placing within the group. Italy took first in the group with a win over the United States.

Pos	Team	W	L	BW	BL	Qual.	ITA	USA	POR
1	Italy	2	0	18	9	Q		9–2	9–7
2	United States	1	1	12	15	Q	2–9		10–6
3	Portugal	0	2	13	19		7–9	6–10	

Source: Official Report, p. 804
Legend: Blue = home team win; Yellow = draw; Red = away team win.

==== Pool B ====
Japan and Hungary each defeated Mexico, then faced off for place within the group. Hungary won to take first place and a bye in the round of 16.

Pos	Team	W	L	BW	BL	Qual.	HUN	JPN	MEX
1	Hungary	2	0	18	9	Q		9–4	14–2
2	Japan	1	1	12	15	Q	4–9		9–7
3	Mexico	0	2	13	19		2–14	7–9	

Source: Official Report, p. 805
Legend: Blue = home team win; Yellow = draw; Red = away team win.

==== Pool C ====
Switzerland and the Soviet Union each defeated Lebanon, though in both cases the bouts were tied at 8–8 and touches received (in victories) were necessary to determine the match winner (Switzerland won 23 touches received to 26; the Soviet Union won 18 to 25). Switzerland and the Soviet Union then faced off for place within the group, with the Soviets winning.

Pos	Team	W	L	BW	BL	Qual.	URS	SUI	LIB
1	Soviet Union	2	0	17	9	Q		9–1	8.25–8.18
2	Switzerland	1	1	9	17	Q	1–9		8.26–8.23
3	Lebanon	0	2	16	16		8.18–8.25	8.23–8.26	

Source: Official Report, p. 806
Legend: Blue = home team win; Yellow = draw; Red = away team win.

==== Pool D ====
Finland and France each defeated Ireland, then faced off for place within the group. France won to take first place.

Pos	Team	W	L	BW	BL	Qual.	FRA	FIN	IRL
1	France	2	0	21	6	Q		9–2	12–4
2	Finland	1	1	14	13	Q	2–9		12–4
3	Ireland	0	2	8	24		4–12	4–12	

Source: Official Report, p. 807
Legend: Blue = home team win; Yellow = draw; Red = away team win.

==== Pool E ====
Luxembourg and Great Britain each defeated Morocco, then faced off for place within the group. Great Britain won to take first place (Great Britain's touches-received lead was great enough that the match was stopped at 8–7; even had Luxembourg won the 16th bout, Great Britain would have the tied-breaker).

Pos	Team	W	L	BW	BL	Qual.	GBR	LUX	MAR
1	Great Britain	2	0	23	8	Q		8–7	15–1
2	Luxembourg	1	1	19	12	Q	7–8		12–4
3	Morocco	0	2	5	27		1–15	4–12	

Source: Official Report, p. 808
Legend: Blue = home team win; Yellow = draw; Red = away team win.

==== Pool F ====
Sweden and Germany each defeated Australia, then faced off for place within the group. Germany won to take first place.

Pos	Team	W	L	BW	BL	Qual.	EUA	SWE	AUS
1	United Team of Germany	2	0	22	10	Q		9–7	13–3
2	Sweden	1	1	18	14	Q	7–9		11–5
3	Australia	0	2	8	24		3–13	5–11	

Source: Official Report, p. 809
Legend: Blue = home team win; Yellow = draw; Red = away team win.

==== Pool G ====
Belgium and Poland each defeated Spain, then faced off for place within the group. They tied, 8–8 with 61 touches received each.

Pos	Team	W	L	BW	BL	Qual.	BEL	POL	ESP
1	Belgium	1.5	0.5	17	15	Q		8–8	9–7
1	Poland	1.5	0.5	17	15	Q	8–8		9–7
3	Spain	0	2	14	18		7–9	7–9	

Source: Official Report, p. 810
Legend: Blue = home team win; Yellow = draw; Red = away team win.

=== Elimination rounds ===
Round of 16
F2	Sweden	9
G1	Belgium	4
D2	Finland	5
F1	United Team of Germany	9
B2	Japan	0
C1	Soviet Union	9
E2	Poland	8 (62)
G2	Luxembourg	8 (61)
A2	United States	5
E1	Great Britain	9
C2	Switzerland	8 (64)
D1	France	8 (66)

Quarter-finals
Sweden	3
A1	Italy	9
United Team of Germany	2
Soviet Union	9
Luxembourg	2
B1	Hungary	9
Great Britain	9
Switzerland	5

Semi-finals
Italy	9
Soviet Union	6
Hungary	7
Great Britain	8

Finals
Italy	9
Great Britain	5
Third place
Soviet Union	9
Hungary	5

== Final classification ==
Rank	Nation
1st place, gold medalist(s)	Italy
2nd place, silver medalist(s)	Great Britain
3rd place, bronze medalist(s)	Soviet Union
4	Hungary
5	United Team of Germany
5	Luxembourg
5	Sweden
5	Switzerland
9	Belgium
9	Finland
9	France
9	Japan
9	Poland
9	United States
15	Australia
15	Ireland
15	Lebanon
15	Mexico
15	Morocco
15	Portugal
15	Spain
