= Fencing at the 1964 Summer Olympics – Men's épée =

Olympic fencing event

Men's épée at the Games of the XVIII Olympiad
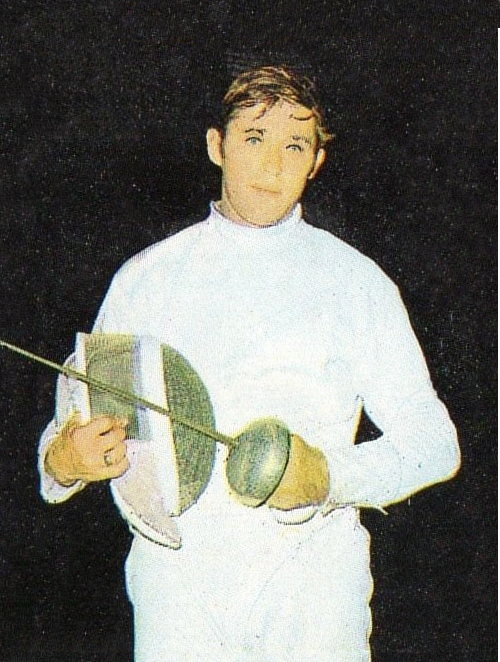
- Grigory Kriss (1972)
- Venue: Waseda University Memorial Hall
- Dates: 18–19 October
- Competitors: 65 from 25 nations

Medalists
1st place, gold medalist(s)		Grigory Kriss; Soviet Union
2nd place, silver medalist(s)		Bill Hoskyns; Great Britain
3rd place, bronze medalist(s)		Guram Kostava; Soviet Union

The men's épée was one of eight fencing events on the fencing at the 1964 Summer Olympics programme. It was the fourteenth appearance of the event. The competition was held from October 18 to 19 1964. 65 fencers from 25 nations competed. Each nation was limited to three fencers. The event was won by Grigory Kriss of the Soviet Union, the nation's first gold medal in the event after a bronze four years earlier. The Soviets also took bronze, with Guram Kostava finishing in third place. Between the two was silver medalist Bill Hoskyns of Great Britain; it was the second consecutive Games with a British silver medalist in the event. Italy's six-Games gold medal streak in the men's individual épée ended with the nation missing the podium entirely; Gianluigi Saccaro finished fourth after losing the bronze-medal barrage to Kostava.

== Background ==
This was the 14th appearance of the event, which was not held at the first Games in 1896 (with only foil and sabre events held) but has been held at every Summer Olympics since 1900.

Four of the eight finalists from the 1960 Games returned, including all three medalists: gold medalist (and 1956 silver medalist) Giuseppe Delfino of Italy, silver medalist Allan Jay of Great Britain, bronze medalist Bruno Habārovs of the Soviet Union, and sixth-place finisher Yves Dreyfus of France. The field included the previous five World Champions: Bill Hoskyns of Great Britain (1958), Habārovs (1959), Jack Guittet of France (1961), István Kausz of Hungary (1962), and Roland Losert of Austria (1963, the reigning champion).

Malaysia and South Korea each made their debut in the event. Belgium and the United States each appeared for the 13th time, tied for most among nations.

== Competition format ==
The competition underwent a significant format change from prior Games. Rather than exclusively pool play, the format now featured a mix of pool play and single-elimination brackets. It was the first time, other than the odd "extra final" round in 1928, that bracket play was used in the event. The format began with two rounds of pool play that narrowed the field to 24 fencers, continued with three rounds of knockout brackets that reduced the competitors to 4, and finished with a final pool featuring those fencers. A ranking bracket was also used for the four quarterfinal losers, placing them 5th, 6th, and 7th (two fencers, with no 7th/8th match). Barrages were used to break ties where necessary for advancement out of pools. Pool round bouts were to 5 touches, with double-losses possible. Knockout round bouts were to 10 touches.

- Round 1: 8 pools, 8 or 9 fencers to a pool, top 5 advance (total 40 advancing)
- Round 2: 6 pools, 6 or 7 fencers to a pool, top 4 advance (total 24 advancing)
- Round of 24: Single-elimination. 16 of the 24 fencers competed, with 8 others having a bye.
- Round of 16: Single-elimination. The 8 winners of the round of 24 faced the 8 fencers who had a bye.
- Quarterfinals: Single-elimination, with losers to a consolation bracket. The winners advanced to the final pool.
- 5th–8th bracket: Quarterfinal losers competed in two 5th–8th semifinals, with the winners playing a 5th/6th final.
- Final pool: The four quarterfinal winners competed in a round-robin final pool.

== Schedule ==
All times are Japan Standard Time (UTC+9)

Date	Time	Round
Sunday, 18 October 1964	8:30	Round 1 Round 2
Monday, 19 October 1964	8:30 17:30	Round of 24; Round of 16; Quarterfinals; Classification 5–8; Final

== Results ==
=== Round 1 ===
==== Round 1 pool A ====
Rank	Fencer	Nation	Wins	Losses	Notes
1	Hans Lagfrwall	Sweden	6	1	Q
2	Bruno Habārovs	Soviet Union	6	1	Q
3	Roland Losert	Austria	5	2	Q
4	Claudio Polledri	Switzerland	4	3	Q
5	John Humphreys	Australia	4	3	Q
6	Zelmar Casco	Argentina	2	5	
7	Kim Man Shik	South Korea	1	6	
8	Ronnie Theseira	Malaysia	0	7	

==== Round 1 pool B ====
Rank	Fencer	Nation	Wins	Losses	Notes
1	Grigory Kriss	Soviet Union	6	1	Q
2	Paul Gnaier	United Team of Germany	5	2	Q
3	Yves Dreyfus	France	4	3	Q
4	Hassan Sayd	Lebanon	4	3	Q
5	Rene van den Driessche	Belgium	3	4	B
5	Okawa Heizaburo	Japan	3	4	B
7	Xuan Tran Van	Vietnam	1	6	
8	Michael Ryan	Ireland	1	6	

Barrage

Rank	Fencer	Nation	Wins	Losses	Notes
5	Okawa Heizaburo	Japan	1	0	Q
6	Rene van den Driessche	Belgium	0	1	

==== Round 1 pool C ====
Rank	Fencer	Nation	Wins	Losses	Notes
1	Peter Jacobs	Great Britain	6	1	Q
2	Henryk Nielaba	Poland	5	2	Q
3	Guram Kostava	Soviet Union	5	2	Q
4	Orvar Lindwall	Sweden	4	3	Q
5	J. Bouchier-Hayes	Ireland	3	4	B
5	Joseph Gemayel	Lebanon	3	4	B
7	Francisco Serp	Argentina	2	5	
8	Bijan Zarnegar	Iran	0	7	

Barrage

Rank	Fencer	Nation	Wins	Losses	Notes
5	J. Bouchier-Hayes	Ireland	1	0	Q
6	Joseph Gemayel	Lebanon	0	1	

==== Round 1 pool D ====
Rank	Fencer	Nation	Wins	Losses	Notes
1	Bogdan Gonsior	Poland	6	1	Q
2	Michel Saikali	Lebanon	5	2	Q
3	Rudolf Trost	Austria	5	2	Q
4	Gianluigi Saccaro	Italy	4	3	Q
5	Stefan Haukler	Romania	4	3	Q
6	Frank Anger	United States	3	4	
7	John Andru	Canada	1	6	
8	Shahpour Zarnegar	Iran	0	7	

==== Round 1 pool E ====
Rank	Fencer	Nation	Wins	Losses	Notes
1	Claude Bourquard	France	7	1	Q
2	Alberto Pellegrino	Italy	6	2	Q
2	Walter Bar	Switzerland	6	2	Q
4	Goran Abrahamson	Sweden	5	3	Q
5	Dietrich Hecke	United Team of Germany	5	3	Q
6	Hahn Myung Seok	South Korea	3	5	
7	Sergio Vergara	Chile	2	6	
8	Didier Tamayo	Colombia	1	7	
9	Houshmand Almasi	Iran	1	7	

==== Round 1 pool F ====
Rank	Fencer	Nation	Wins	Losses	Notes
1	Franz Rompza	United Team of Germany	6	1	Q
2	Gyoyo Kulcsar	Hungary	5	2	Q
3	Giuseppe Delfino	Italy	4	3	Q
4	Allan Jay	Great Britain	4	3	Q
5	Marcus Leyrer	Austria	3	4	B
5	Ivan Lund	Australia	3	4	B
7	Robert Foxcroft	Canada	2	5	
8	Ernesto Sastre	Colombia	0	7	

Barrage

Rank	Fencer	Nation	Wins	Losses	Notes
5	Marcus Leyrer	Austria	1	0	Q
6	Ivan Lund	Australia	0	1	

==== Round 1 pool G ====
Rank	Fencer	Nation	Wins	Losses	Notes
1	Tabuchi Kazuhiko	Japan	5	2	Q
2	Jack Guittet	France	5	2	Q
3	Michel Steininger	Switzerland	4	3	Q
4	Istvan Kausz	Hungary	4	3	Q
5	David Micahnik	United States	4	3	Q
6	Russ Hobby	Australia	3	4	
7	Sergio Jimenez	Chile	2	5	
8	Emilio Echeverri	Colombia	1	6	

==== Round 1 pool H ====
Rank	Fencer	Nation	Wins	Losses	Notes
1	Bill Hoskyns	Great Britain	6	1	Q
2	Zoltan Nemere	Hungary	6	1	Q
3	Paul Pesthy	United States	4	3	Q
4	Shin Doo Ho	South Korea	4	3	Q
5	Wieslaw Glos	Poland	4	3	Q
6	Araki Toshiaki	Japan	3	4	
7	Aquiles Gloffka	Chile	1	6	
8	Jesus Taboada	Argentina	0	7	

=== Round 2 ===
==== Round 2 pool A ====
Rank	Fencer	Nation	Wins	Losses	Notes
1	Gyozo Kulcsar	Hungary	5	1	Q
2	Hans Lagfrwall	Sweden	4	2	Q
3	Hassan Sayd	Lebanon	3	3	Q
4	Giuseppe Delfino	Italy	3	3	Q
5	Wieslaw Glos	Poland	2	4	
6	J. Bouchier-Hayes	Ireland	1	5	
7	Tabuchi Kazuhiko	Japan	1	5	

==== Round 2 pool B ====
Rank	Fencer	Nation	Wins	Losses	Notes
1	Grigory Kriss	Soviet Union	4	2	Q
2	Bill Hoskyns	Great Britain	4	2	Q
3	Alberto Pellegrino	Italy	4	2	Q
4	Goran Abrahamson	Sweden	3	3	B
4	David Micahnik	United States	3	3	B
6	Istvan Kausz	Hungary	2	4	
7	Yves Dreyfus	France	1	5	

Barrage

Rank	Fencer	Nation	Wins	Losses	Notes
4	Goran Abrahamson	Sweden	1	0	Q
5	David Micahnik	United States	0	1	

==== Round 2 pool C ====
Rank	Fencer	Nation	Wins	Losses	Notes
1	Gianluigi Saccaro	Italy	4	2	Q
2	Jack Guittet	France	4	2	Q
3	Michel Steininger	Switzerland	4	2	Q
4	Paul Gnaier	United Team of Germany	3	3	Q
5	Marcus Leyrer	Austria	2	4	
6	Peter Jacobs	Great Britain	1	5	
7	Shin Doo Ho	South Korea	1	5	

==== Round 2 pool D ====
Rank	Fencer	Nation	Wins	Losses	Notes
1	Bogdan Gonsior	Poland	4	2	Q
2	Rudolf Trost	Austria	4	2	Q
3	Zoltan Nemere	Hungary	4	2	Q
4	Dietrich Hecke	United Team of Germany	3	3	Q
5	Bruno Habārovs	Soviet Union	2	4	
6	Okawa Heizaburo	Japan	2	4	
7	Claudio Polledri	Switzerland	2	4	

==== Round 2 pool E ====
Rank	Fencer	Nation	Wins	Losses	Notes
1	Roland Losert	Austria	5	0	Q
2	Claude Bourquard	France	3	2	Q
3	Guram Kostava	Soviet Union	3	2	Q
4	Orvar Lindwall	Sweden	2	3	Q
5	Stefan Haukler	Romania	0	5	
6	Michel Saikali	Lebanon	0	5	

==== Round 2 pool F ====
Rank	Fencer	Nation	Wins	Losses	Notes
1	Henryk Nielaba	Poland	4	1	Q
2	Franz Rompza	United Team of Germany	4	1	Q
3	Walter Bar	Switzerland	2	3	B
3	John Humphreys	Australia	2	3	B
3	Allan Jay	Great Britain	2	3	B
6	Paul Pesthy	United States	1	4	

Barrage

Rank	Fencer	Nation	Wins	Losses	Notes
3	Walter Bar	Switzerland	1	0	Q
4	John Humphreys	Australia	1	0	Q
5	Allan Jay	Great Britain	0	2	

=== Knockout rounds ===
The winner of each group advanced to the final pool, while the runner-up moved into a 5th-place semifinal.

==== Group 1 ====
Round of 24
Goran Abrahamson (SWE)	10
Rudolf Trost (AUT)	9
Dietrich Hecke (EUA)	10
Alberto Pellegrino (ITA)	9

Round of 16
Grigory Kriss (URS)	10
Goran Abrahamson (SWE)	9
Bogdan Gonsior (POL)	10
Dietrich Hecke (EUA)	5

Quarterfinals
Grigory Kriss (URS)	10
Bogdan Gonsior (POL)	3

==== Group 2 ====
Round of 24
Zoltan Nemere (HUN)	10
Giuseppe Delfino (ITA)	8
Jack Guittet (FRA)	10
Walter Bar (SUI)	9

Round of 16
Bill Hoskyns (GBR)	10
Zoltan Nemere (HUN)	7
Franz Rompza (EUA)	10
Jack Guittet (FRA)	10

Quarterfinals
Bill Hoskyns (GBR)	10
Franz Rompza (EUA)	5

==== Group 3 ====
Round of 24
Guram Kostava (URS)	10
Michel Steininger (SUI)	5
Orvar Lindwall (SWE)	10
Hassan Sayd (LIB)	3

Round of 16
Guram Kostava (URS)	10
Roland Losert (AUT)	9
Orvar Lindwall (SWE)	10
Gyozo Kulcsar (HUN)	6

Quarterfinals
Guram Kostava (URS)	10
Orvar Lindwall (SWE)	3

==== Group 4 ====
Round of 24
Gianluigi Saccaro (ITA)	10
Paul Gnaier (EUA)	4
Henryk Nielaba (POL)	10
John Humphreys (AUS)	5

Round of 16
Gianluigi Saccaro (ITA)	10
Hans Lagfrwall (SWE)	4
Claude Bourquard (FRA)	10
Henryk Nielaba (POL)	7

Quarterfinals
Gianluigi Saccaro (ITA)	10
Claude Bourquard (FRA)	8

=== Fifth place semifinal ===
Fifth place semifinals
Bogdan Gonsior (POL)	10
Orvar Lindwall (SWE)	7
Franz Rompza (EUA)	8
Claude Bourquard (FRA)	10

Fifth place match
Bogdan Gonsior (POL)	10
Claude Bourquard (FRA)	3

=== Final ===
Rank	Fencer	Nation	Wins	Losses	Notes
1	Bill Hoskyns	Great Britain	2	1	GB
1	Grigory Kriss	Soviet Union	2	1	GB
3	Guram Kostava	Soviet Union	1	2	BB
3	Gianluigi Saccaro	Italy	1	2	BB

Gold medal barrage

Rank	Fencer	Nation	Wins	Losses
1st place, gold medalist(s)	Grigory Kriss	Soviet Union	1	0
2nd place, silver medalist(s)	Bill Hoskyns	Great Britain	0	1

Bronze medal barrage

Rank	Fencer	Nation	Wins	Losses
3rd place, bronze medalist(s)	Guram Kostava	Soviet Union	1	0
4	Gianluigi Saccaro	Italy	0	1

== Sources ==
- Tokyo Organizing Committee (1964). The Games of the XVIII Olympiad: Tokyo 1964, vol. 2.
