= Fencing at the 1964 Summer Olympics – Men's team épée =

Men's team épée at the Games of the XVIII Olympiad
- Venue: Waseda Memorial Hall
- Dates: October 20–21
- Competitors: 86 from 18 nations

Medalists
1st place, gold medalist(s)		Győző Kulcsár; Zoltán Nemere; Tamás Gábor; István Kausz; Árpád Bárány	Hungary
2nd place, silver medalist(s)		Giuseppe Delfino; Alberto Pellegrino; Gianluigi Saccaro; Gianfranco Paolucci; Giovanni Battista Breda	Italy
3rd place, bronze medalist(s)		Claude Brodin; Yves Dreyfus; Claude Bourquard; Jack Guittet; Jacques Brodin	France

The men's team épée was one of eight fencing events on the fencing at the 1964 Summer Olympics programme. It was the twelfth appearance of the event. The competition was held October 20–21, 1964, with 86 fencers from 18 nations competing.

== Results ==
=== Round 1 ===
Ties between teams were broken by individual victories (in parentheses), then by touches received.

Pool A
1.	Soviet Union	2-0 (24)	Q2
2.	Switzerland	2-0 (21)	Q2
3.	Argentina	0-2 (6)
4.	Lebanon	0-2 (4)

Pool B
1.	Austria	2-0 (24)	Q2
2.	Sweden	2-0 (23)	Q2
3.	Australia	0-2 (6)
4.	Colombia	0-2 (3)

Pool C
1.	Italy	2-0 (25)	Q2
2.	Hungary	2-0 (25)	Q2
3.	Japan	0-2 (6)
4.	Iran	0-2 (1)

Pool D
1.	United Team of Germany	1-1 (17)	Q2
2.	Great Britain	1-1 (16)	Q2
3.	United States	1-1 (14)

Pool E
1.	Poland	1-0 (14)	Q2
2.	France	1-0 (9)	Q2
3.	United States	0-2 (2)

=== Championship rounds ===
Round of 16
Hungary	8
Austria	1
Switzerland	8
Great Britain	4

Quarter-finals
Hungary	8
Soviet Union	4
France	8
United Team of Germany	4
Italy	9
Poland	6
Sweden	9
Switzerland	1

Semi-finals
Hungary	9
France	3
Italy	8
Sweden	2

Final
Hungary	8
Italy	3
Third place
France	8
Sweden	8

==== Fifth place semifinal ====
Fifth place semifinals
Poland	9
Switzerland	5
United Team of Germany	8
Soviet Union	3

Fifth place match
Poland	8 (66)
United Team of Germany	8 (62)

== Rosters ==
Argentina

- Félix Galimi
- Zelmar Casco
- Jesús Taboada
- Francisco Serp

Australia

- Russell Hobby
- John Humphreys
- Imants Terrauds
- Ivan Lund
- Ian Bowditch

Austria

- Udo Birnbaum
- Herbert Polzhuber
- Roland Losert
- Rudolf Trost
- Marcus Leyrer

Colombia

- Emilio Echeverry
- Ernesto Sastre
- Dibier Tamayo
- Humberto Posada

France

- Claude Brodin
- Yves Dreyfus
- Claude Bourquard
- Jack Guittet
- Jacques Brodin

Great Britain

- Bill Hoskyns
- John Pelling
- Peter Jacobs
- Michael Howard
- Allan Jay

Germany

- Franz Rompza
- Max Geuter
- Volkmar Würtz
- Paul Gnaier
- Haakon Stein

Hungary

- Győző Kulcsár
- Zoltán Nemere
- Tamás Gábor
- István Kausz
- Árpád Bárány

Iran

- Houshmand Almasi
- Nasser Madani
- Bizhan Zarnegar
- Shahpour Zarnegar

Italy

- Giuseppe Delfino
- Alberto Pellegrino
- Gianluigi Saccaro
- Gianfranco Paolucci
- Giovanni Battista Breda

Japan

- Toshiaki Araki
- Katsutada Minatoi
- Kazuhiko Tabuchi
- Heizaburo Okawa
- Takeshi Teshima

Lebanon

- Michel Saykali
- Joseph Gemayel
- Hassan El-Said
- Ibrahim Osman

Poland

- Henryk Nielaba
- Mikołaj Pomarnacki
- Bogdan Gonsior
- Bohdan Andrzejewski
- Jerzy Pawłowski

South Korea

- Sin Du-Ho
- Kim Chang-Hwan
- Han Myeong-Seok
- Kim Man-Sig

Soviet Union

- Bruno Habārovs
- Guram Kostava
- Yury Smolyakov
- Grigory Kriss
- Aleksey Nikanchikov

Switzerland

- Claudio Polledri
- Paul Meister
- Walter Bar
- Jean Gontier
- Michel Steininger

Sweden

- Ivar Genesjö
- Orvar Lindwall
- Hans Lagerwall
- Göran Abrahamsson
- Carl-Wilhelm Engdahl

United States

- Paul Pesthy
- Frank Anger
- David Micahnik
- Larry Anastasi

== Sources ==
- Tokyo Organizing Committee (1964). The Games of the XVIII Olympiad: Tokyo 1964, vol. 2.
