= Sweden at the 1960 Summer Olympics =

- IOC code: SWE (SVE used at these Games)
- NOC: Swedish Olympic Committee

in Rome
- Competitors: 134 (115 men and 19 women) in 15 sports
- Flag bearer: William Grut
- Medals Ranked 16th: Gold 1 Silver 2 Bronze 3 Total 6

Summer Olympics appearances (overview)
- 1896; 1900; 1904; 1908; 1912; 1920; 1924; 1928; 1932; 1936; 1948; 1952; 1956; 1960; 1964; 1968; 1972; 1976; 1980; 1984; 1988; 1992; 1996; 2000; 2004; 2008; 2012; 2016; 2020; 2024

Other related appearances
- 1906 Intercalated Games

Sweden, the previous host of the Equestrian events at the 1956 Summer Olympics in Stockholm, competed at the 1960 Summer Olympics in Rome, Italy. 134 competitors, 115 men and 19 women, took part in 100 events in 15 sports.

== Medalists ==
Medal	Name	Sport	Event
Gold	Sven-Olov Sjödelius, Gert Fredriksson	Canoeing	Men's K2 1000 m
Silver	John Ljunggren	Athletics	Men's 50 km Walk
Silver	Jane Cederqvist	Swimming	Women's 400 m Freestyle
Bronze	Gert Fredriksson	Canoeing	Men's K1 1000 m
Bronze	Gustav Freij	Wrestling (Greco-Roman)	Men's Lightweight
Bronze	Hans Antonsson	Wrestling	Men's Freestyle Middleweight

== Cycling ==
Four cyclists, all male, represented Sweden in 1960.

Individual road race

- Gunnar Göransson
- Osvald Johansson
- Owe Adamson
- Gösta Pettersson

Team time trial

- Owe Adamson
- Gunnar Göransson
- Osvald Johansson
- Gösta Pettersson

== Diving ==
Men

Athlete	Event	Preliminary		Semi-final				Final			
Athlete	Event	Points	Rank	Points	Rank	Total	Rank	Points	Rank	Total	Rank
Johnny Hellström	3 m springboard	51.91	14 Q	39.40	9	91.31	13	Did not advance			
Göran Lundqvist	3 m springboard	52.36	13 Q	38.87	10	91.23	14	Did not advance			
Göran Lundqvist	10 m platform	52.32	8 Q	38.54	9	90.86	11	Did not advance			
Toivo Öhman	10 m platform	50.97	15 Q	38.53	10	89.50	12	Did not advance			

Women

Athlete	Event	Preliminary		Final			
Athlete	Event	Points	Rank	Points	Rank	Total	Rank
Birte Hanson	10 m platform	53.03	4 Q	24.40	12	77.43	12

== Fencing ==
Seven fencers, six men and one woman, represented Sweden in 1960.

Men's foil

- Hans Lagerwall
- Orvar Lindwall
- Göran Abrahamsson

Men's épée

- Berndt-Otto Rehbinder
- Göran Abrahamsson
- Hans Lagerwall

Men's team épée

- Hans Lagerwall, Göran Abrahamsson, Ulf Ling-Vannérus, Berndt-Otto Rehbinder, Carl-Wilhelm Engdahl, Orvar Lindwall

Women's foil

- Christina Lagerwall

== Modern pentathlon ==
Three male pentathletes represented Sweden in 1960.

Individual

- Per-Erik Ritzén
- Sture Ericson
- Björn Thofelt

Team

- Per-Erik Ritzén
- Sture Ericson
- Björn Thofelt

== Rowing ==
Sweden had 12 male rowers participate in four out of seven rowing events in 1960.

Men's coxless pair

- Gösta Eriksson
- Lennart Hansson

Men's coxed pair

- Gösta Eriksson
- Lennart Hansson
- Owe Lostad (cox)

Men's coxed four

- Rune Andersson
- Lars-Eric Gustafsson
- Ulf Gustafsson
- Kjell Hansson
- Owe Lostad (cox)

Men's eight

- Rune Andersson
- Bengt-Åke Bengtsson
- Åke Berntsson
- Lars-Eric Gustafsson
- Ulf Gustafsson
- Kjell Hansson
- Per Hedenberg
- Ralph Hurtig
- Owe Lostad (cox)
- Sture Baatz (round one)

== Shooting ==
Nine shooters represented Sweden in 1960.

25 m pistol

- Jan Wallén
- Stig Berntsson

50 m pistol

- Torsten Ullman
- Leif Larsson

300 m rifle, three positions

- Anders Kvissberg
- Kurt Johansson

50 m rifle, three positions

- Anders Kvissberg
- Walther Fröstell

50 m rifle, prone

- Anders Kvissberg
- Kurt Johansson

Trap

- Rune Andersson
- Carl Beck-Friis

== Swimming ==
Men

Athlete	Event	Heat		Semifinal		Final	
Athlete	Event	Time	Rank	Time	Rank	Time	Rank
Per-Ola Lindberg	100 m freestyle	57.1	12 Q	56.4	6 Q	57.1	8
Bengt Nordwall	100 m freestyle	58.5	27	Did not advance			
Per-Olof Ericsson	400 m freestyle	4:41.2	22	—N/a		Did not advance	
Sven-Göran Johansson	400 m freestyle	4:35.6	14	—N/a		Did not advance	
Lars-Erik Bengtsson	1500 m freestyle	18:19.7	11	—N/a		Did not advance	
Bengt-Olov Almstedt	100 m backstroke	1:05.9	=20	Did not advance			
Tommie Lindström	200 m breaststroke	2:42.8	18	Did not advance			
Bernt Nilsson	200 m breaststroke	2:45.7	23	Did not advance			
Håkan Bengtsson	200 m butterfly	2:25.0	17	Did not advance			
Sven-Göran Johansson; Lars-Erik Bengtsson; Bengt Nordwall; Per-Ola Lindberg; Bengt-Olov Almstedt	4 × 200 m freestyle	8:30.6	=7 Q	—N/a		8:31.0	6

Women

Athlete	Event	Heat		Semifinal		Final	
Athlete	Event	Time	Rank	Time	Rank	Time	Rank
Karin Larsson	100 m freestyle	1:06.3	16 Q	1:06.5	16	Did not advance	
Inger Thorngren	100 m freestyle	1:06.1	15 Q	1:05.5	=13	Did not advance	
Jane Cederqvist	400 m freestyle	4:55.6	2 Q	—N/a		4:53.9	2nd place, silver medalist(s)
Bibbi Segerström	400 m freestyle	4:57.6	=5 Q	—N/a		5:02.4	8
Barbro Eriksson	200 m breaststroke	2:59.8	14	—N/a		Did not advance	
Karin Larsson	100 m butterfly	1:15.0	14	—N/a		Did not advance	
Kristina Larsson	100 m butterfly	1:13.0	8 Q	—N/a		1:13.6	7
Inger Thorngren; Karin Larsson; Kristina Larsson; Bibbi Segerström	4 × 100 m freestyle	4:27.3	6 Q	—N/a		4:25.1	6
