= Belgium at the 1960 Summer Olympics =

- IOC code: BEL
- NOC: Belgian Olympic Committee

in Rome
- Competitors: 101 (93 men and 8 women) in 16 sports
- Flag bearer: André Nelis
- Medals Ranked 26th: Gold 0 Silver 2 Bronze 2 Total 4

Summer Olympics appearances (overview)
- 1900; 1904; 1908; 1912; 1920; 1924; 1928; 1932; 1936; 1948; 1952; 1956; 1960; 1964; 1968; 1972; 1976; 1980; 1984; 1988; 1992; 1996; 2000; 2004; 2008; 2012; 2016; 2020; 2024

Other related appearances
- 1906 Intercalated Games

Belgium competed at the 1960 Summer Olympics in Rome, Italy. 101 competitors, 93 men and 8 women, took part in 64 events in 16 sports.

== Medalists ==
=== Silver ===
- Roger Moens – Athletics, Men's 800 metres
- Leo Sterckx – Cycling, Men's sprint

=== Bronze ===
- Willy van den Berghen – Cycling, Men's individual road race
- André Nelis – Sailing, Men's Finn class

== Athletics ==
Key

- Note–Ranks given for track events are within the athlete's heat only
- Q = Qualified for the next round
- q = Qualified for the next round as a fastest loser

Men
Track & road events

Athlete	Event	Heat		Quarterfinal		Semifinal		Final	
Athlete	Event	Result	Rank	Result	Rank	Result	Rank	Result	Rank
Romain Poté	100 m	11.0	5	Did not advance					
Jean-Pierre Barra	200 m	22.3	4	Did not advance					
Romain Poté	200 m	22.1	4	Did not advance					
Lodewijk De Clerck	400 m	48.4	7	—N/a				Did not advance	
Marcel Lambrechts	400 m	49.5	5	—N/a				Did not advance	
Jos Lambrechts	800 m	1:49.24	3 Q	DNS		Did not advance			
Roger Moens	800 m	1:50.73	1 Q	1:48.69	1 Q	1:47.49	2 Q	1:46.55	2nd place, silver medalist(s)
Roger Moens	1500 m	—N/a				DNS		Did not advance	
Hedwig Leenaert	5000 m	14:25.81	6	—N/a				Did not advance	
Eugène Allonsius	5000 m	14:37.20	6	—N/a				Did not advance	
Hedwig Leenaert	10,000 m	—N/a						DNS	
Marcel Lambrechts	400 m hurdles	53.5	5	—N/a		Did not advance			
Gaston Roelants	3000 m steeplechase	8:49.52	3	—N/a				8:47.45	4
Marcel Lambrechts; Jos Lambrechts; Lodewijk De Clerck; Roger Moens	4 × 400 m relay	3:15.26	4	—N/a		Did not advance			
Aurèle Vandendriessche	Marathon	—N/a						DNF	

Field events

Athlete	Event	Qualification		Final	
Athlete	Event	Result	Rank	Result	Rank
Romain Poté	Long jump	6.92	38	Did not advance	
Raymond Van Dijck	Pole vault	4.00	23	Did not advance	

Combined events – Decathlon

Athlete	Event	100 m	LJ	SP	HJ	400 m	110 m H	DT	PV	JT	1500 m	Final	Rank
Léopold Marien	Result	11.5	6.62	11.44	1.75	50.5	15.5	34.28	3.30	44.71	4:40.0	5919	18
Léopold Marien	Points	737	672	535	711	807	694	477	438	434	414	5919	18

== Cycling ==
13 cyclists, all men, represented Belgium in 1960.

Individual road race

- Willy Vanden Berghen
- Benoni Beheyt
- Robert Lelangue
- Joseph Geurts

Team time trial

- Benoni Beheyt
- Willy Monty
- Willy Vanden Berghen
- Yvan Covent

Sprint

- Leo Sterckx
- Gilbert De Rieck

1000m time trial

- Jean Govaerts

Team pursuit

- Romain De Loof
- Barthélemy Gillard
- Frans Melckenbeeck
- Charles Rabaey

== Fencing ==
15 fencers, 12 men and 3 women, represented Belgium in 1960.

Men's foil

- André Verhalle
- Franck Delhem
- Jacques Debeur

Men's team foil

- Jacques Debeur, André Verhalle, François Dehez, Franck Delhem

Men's épée

- Roger Achten
- François Dehez
- René Van Den Driessche

Men's team épée

- Pierre Francisse, René Van Den Driessche, Jacques Debeur, Roger Achten, François Dehez

Men's sabre

- Marcel Van Der Auwera
- José Van Baelen
- Gustave Ballister

Men's team sabre

- José Van Baelen, Gustave Ballister, Marcel Van Der Auwera, François Heywaert, Roger Petit

Women's foil

- Jacqueline Appart
- Marie Melchers
- Claude Wallet

== Modern pentathlon ==
One male pentathlete represented Belgium in 1960.

Individual

- Arsène Pint

== Rowing ==
Belgium had 5 male rowers participate in two out of seven rowing events in 1960.

Men's double sculls

- Gérard Higny
- Jean-Marie Lemaire

Men's coxed pair

- Roland Bollenberg
- Edgard Luca
- Étienne Pollet

== Shooting ==
Three shooters represented Belgium in 1960.

50 m pistol

- Marcel Lafortune

50 m rifle, three positions

- Jacques Lafortune
- Frans Lafortune

50 m rifle, prone

- Frans Lafortune
- Jacques Lafortune

== Swimming ==
Men

Athlete	Event	Heat		Swim-Off		Semifinal		Final	
Athlete	Event	Time	Rank	Time	Rank	Time	Rank	Time	Rank
Herman Verbauwen	100 m backstroke	1:05.0	15 Q	—N/a		1:06.2	15	Did not advance	
Gilbert Desmit	200 m breaststroke	2:42.4	=15 QSO	2:41.1	2 Q	2:41.8	13	Did not advance	

Women

Athlete	Event	Heat		Final	
Athlete	Event	Time	Rank	Time	Rank
Anne Van Parijs	100 m backstroke	1:20.4	27	Did not advance	
