= Gérard Lefranc =

French fencer (1935–2025)

Personal information
- National team: French military national fencing team French national fencing team
- Born: 7 May 1935 Calais, France
- Died: 23 June 2025 (aged 90)
- Height: 198 cm (6 ft 6 in)
- Weight: 78 kg (172 lb)

Sport
- Sport: Fencing

Gérard Lefranc (French: [ʒeʁaʁ ləfʁɑ̃]; 7 May 1935 – 23 June 2025) was a French fencer. He became the champion of the French Armed Forces in 1957 and subsequently won medals at many competitions. An épée fencer, he was a national champion and also won several team titles. As a member of the French national team, he won four medals at the World Fencing Championships, including a gold in 1962. He also competed in the team épée event at the 1960 Summer Olympics, but failed to medal. Later in life he ran his family's industrial business.

== Biography ==
Lefranc was born on 7 May 1935 in Calais, France. After World War II, he began competing in fencing at Jean-Jaurès high school in Calais. He trained further while at the École nationale professionelle, learning under Master Henri. A member of the Calais Fencing Club, he performed well in local competitions and was later invited to the French military national team by 1957. As a member of Calais, he was a five-time Northern France champion in the team épée event while being a three-time Northern France champion in the individual épée.

Lefranc was the champion of the French Armed Forces in 1957, national champion in the épée, and helped the French team win the 1957 international military championship. He contributed to France's team bronze medal at the 1958 World Fencing Championships and won another bronze in the team event at the 1959 World Fencing Championships. At the national championships, Lefranc won team titles in 1960, 1961, 1964 and 1966, while winning the national épée title in 1961, placing third in 1958 and 1962, and second in 1965. He participated in the team épée event for France at the 1960 Summer Olympics, but the team was defeated by Switzerland in the second round and thus did not medal. In 1961, he won silver in the team event at the 1961 World Fencing Championships and also defeated Giuseppe Delfino, reigning Olympic champion, for the title at the New York Fencing Club championship. He then was part of the French team that won the gold medal at the 1962 World Fencing Championships, and two years later, he won silver in the individual event at the European Cup.

Lefranc later retired to run his family's business, which provided industrial parts for power transmission. He also "fell in love with carnival" and "found a place for himself in the carnival-goers". Standing at over 2 metres (6 ft 7 in), he was known locally as the "Green Giant". He was honored as a knight of the Ordre national du Mérite. On 10 September 2017, his fencing club renovated their fencing hall and named it in his honor. He died on 23 June 2025, at the age of 90.
