= Adalbert Gurath =

Adalbert Gurath may refer to:

- Adalbert Gurath, Sr. (born 1915), fencer who represented Romania at the 1952 Summer Olympics
- Adalbert Gurath, Jr. (born 1942), son of above, who fenced for Romania at the 1960 Summer Olympics
