= Valentin Chernikov =

Soviet fencer (1937–2002)

Personal information
- Born: 1 April 1937 Yerevan, Armenian SSR, Soviet Union
- Died: 5 January 2002 (aged 64) Nizhny Novgorod, Russia

Sport
- Sport: Fencing
Medal record
Men's fencing
Representing Soviet Union
Olympic Games
Bronze medal – third place	1960 Rome	Épée, team
World Fencing Championships
Silver medal – second place	1959 Budapest	Épée, team
Gold medal – first place	1961 Turin	Épée, team
Bronze medal – third place	1962 Buenos Aires	Épée, team

Valentin Chernikov (Armenian: Վալենտին Չեռնիկով, 1 April 1937, Yerevan – 5 January 2002, Nizhny Novgorod) was a Soviet Olympic fencer. He won a bronze medal in the team épée event at the 1960 Summer Olympics. He also won the gold medal at the 1961 World Fencing Championships in the team épée.
