= Fujimaki =

Fujimaki (written: 藤巻 or 藤牧) is a Japanese surname. Notable people with the surname include:

- Eriko Fujimaki (藤巻 恵理子, born 1974), Japanese voice actress
- Shogo Fujimaki (藤牧 祥吾, born 1989), Japanese footballer
- Sonosuke Fujimaki (藤巻 惣之助, born 1939), Japanese fencer
- Tadatoshi Fujimaki (藤巻 忠俊, born 1982), Japanese manga artist

== See also ==
- Fujioka Fujimaki, a Japanese folk band
