= Sergio Jimenez =

Sergio Jimenez may refer to:

- Sergio Jiménez (1937–2007), Mexican actor
- Sérgio Jimenez (born 1984), Brazilian racecar driver
- Sergio Jiménez (fencer) (born 1940), Chilean Olympic fencer
