= Raymond Harrison =

British fencer (1929–2000)

Personal information
- Born: 4 August 1929 Northolt, London, England
- Died: 2000 (aged 70–71)

Sport
- Sport: Fencing
Medal record
Men's fencing
Representing United Kingdom
Olympic Games
| Silver medal – second place | 1960 Rome | Épée, team |

Raymond Harrison (4 August 1929 – 2000) was a British fencer. He won a silver medal in the team épée event at the 1960 Summer Olympics.
