= István Kausz =

Hungarian fencer (1932–2020)

Personal information
- Born: 18 August 1932 Budapest, Hungary
- Died: 3 June 2020 (aged 87) Budapest, Hungary

Sport
- Sport: Fencing
Medal record
Representing Hungary
Olympic Games
Gold medal – first place	1964 Tokyo	Team épée
World Championships
Gold medal – first place	1959 Budapest	Team épée
Gold medal – first place	1962 Buenos Aires	Individual épée
Silver medal – second place	1957 Paris	Team épée
Silver medal – second place	1958 Philadelphia	Team épée
Bronze medal – third place	1963 Gdansk	Team épée
Summer Universiade
Gold medal – first place	1959 Turin	Individual épée
Bronze medal – third place	1959 Turin	Team épée

István Kausz (18 August 1932 – 3 June 2020) was a Hungarian fencer. He won a gold medal in the team épée event at the 1964 Summer Olympics.

Born in Budapest, Kausz competed for Budapest Vasas Sports Club before moving to Budapest Progress and then finally moving to OSC in 1957 until 1970 when he retired. Kausz started out as a modern pentathlete, he would later just concentrate on the Épée form of fencing.

Kausz was part of the Hungarian team that won the épée team gold at the 1959 World Fencing Championships, which was held in his home city of Budapest, the following year he competed in the 1960 Summer Olympics. In the individual épée event, Kausz managed to get through three rounds before finishing last in his semi-final group, in the team épée, the team reached the semi-finals before losing to Great Britain and then lost to the Soviet Union team in the contest for the bronze medal.

In between his Olympic appearances, Kausz won the individual gold medal at the 1962 World Fencing Championships.

At the 1964 Summer Olympics, Kausz only managed to reach the second round in the individual épée, but in the team épée, with fellow countrymen, Győző Kulcsár, Zoltán Nemere, Tamás Gábor and Árpád Bárány, went all the way to the final and beat the Italian team to win the gold medal.

During his sporting years Kausz also managed to earn a degree in medicine and would later become a doctor for the Hungarian swimming team, and was part of the Hungarian Olympic medical team for six summer Olympics.
