= Aleksandr Pavlovsky =

Soviet fencer (1936–1977)

Personal information
- Born: 14 July 1936 Minsk, Belarusian SSR, Soviet Union
- Died: 4 July 1977 (aged 40)

Sport
- Sport: Fencing
Medal record
Men's fencing
Representing Soviet Union
Olympic Games
Bronze medal – third place	1960 Rome	Épée, team

Aleksandr Pavlovsky (Russian: Александр Анатольевич Павловский; 14 July 1936 – 4 July 1977) was a Soviet fencer. He won a bronze in the team épée event at the 1960 Summer Olympics.
