= Michael Alexander (diplomat) =

British diplomat

Sir Michael Alexander
Personal information
- Born: 19 June 1936 Winchester, Hampshire, England
- Died: 1 June 2002 (aged 65) London, England

Sport
- Sport: Fencing
Medal record
Men's fencing
Representing United Kingdom
Olympic Games
Silver medal – second place	1960 Rome	Épée, team

Sir Michael O'Donel Bjarne Alexander GCMG (19 June 1936 – 1 June 2002) was a British diplomat. He was the foreign policy secretary to Margaret Thatcher and the UK ambassador to NATO.

Alexander was the son of Hugh Alexander, the Anglo-Irish mathematician famed for his work at Bletchley Park. Michael spent much of his youth in his father's native Ireland. He was educated at Foyle College in Derry and, later, at St Paul's School, London, and King's College, Cambridge. He competed as a fencer for Great Britain at the 1960 Summer Olympics, winning a silver medal in the team épée event.

Alexander also served as Permanent Representative on the North Atlantic Council and Ambassador to Austria.
