= Bruno Habārovs =

Soviet fencer (1939–1994)

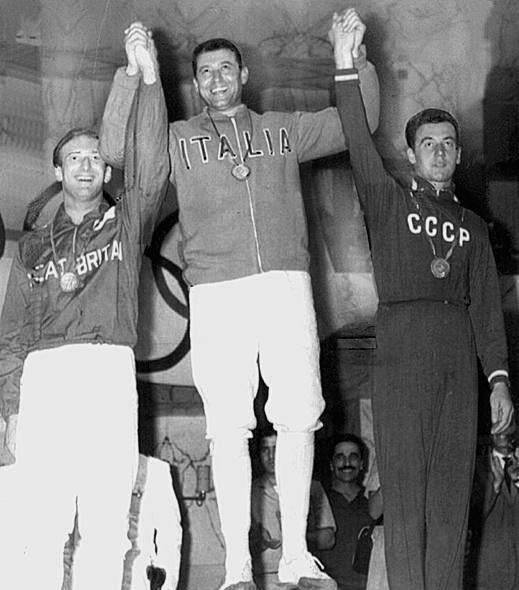
- Habārovs (right) at the 1960 Olympics

Personal information
- Born: 30 April 1939 Riga, Latvia
- Died: 29 August 1994 (aged 55) Riga, Latvia
- Height: 187 cm (6 ft 2 in)
- Weight: 78 kg (172 lb)

Sport
- Sport: Fencing
- Club: Dynamo Riga
Medal record
Representing Soviet Union
Olympic Games
Bronze medal – third place	1960 Rome	Individual épée
Bronze medal – third place	1960 Rome	Team épée
World Championships
Gold medal – first place	1959 Budapest	Individual épée
Gold medal – first place	1961 Turin	Team épée
Silver medal – second place	1959 Budapest	Team épée
Bronze medal – third place	1962 Buenos Aires	Team épée
Bronze medal – third place	1965 Paris	Team épée
Summer Universiade
Silver medal – second place	1965 Budapest	Individual épée
Silver medal – second place	1965 Budapest	Team épée

Bruno Habārovs (30 April 1939 – 29 August 1994) was a Latvian fencer. He competed for the Soviet Union in the individual and team épée at the 1960 and 1964 Olympics and won bronze medals in both events in 1960. Between 1959 and 1965, he won five épée medals at the world championships, including the individual gold in 1959.
