= Gilbert Orengo =

Monegasque fencer (1934–1990)

Personal information
- Born: 10 March 1934 Monaco
- Died: 1990 (aged 55–56)

Sport
- Sport: Fencing

Gilbert Orengo (10 March 1934 – 1990) was a Monegasque fencer. He competed in the individual foil and épée events at the 1960 Summer Olympics.
