= Sven-Göran Johansson =

Swedish swimmer (born 1943)

Personal information
- Born: 29 April 1943 (age 83) Västerås, Sweden

Sport
- Sport: Swimming

Sven-Göran Johansson (born 29 April 1943) is a Swedish former freestyle swimmer. He competed in two events at the 1960 Summer Olympics.

Johansson represented Västerås SS.
