= Henri Bini =

Monegasque fencer (1931–2014)

Personal information
- Born: 11 May 1931 Monaco
- Died: 28 November 2014 (aged 83)

Sport
- Sport: Fencing

Henri Bini (11 May 1931 – 28 November 2014) was a Monegasque fencer. He competed in the individual foil and épée events at the 1960 Summer Olympics.
