= Dietrich Hecke =

German fencer

Personal information
- Born: 13 February 1935 (age 91) Aachen, Germany

Sport
- Sport: Fencing

Dietrich Hecke (born 13 February 1935) is a German fencer. He represented the United Team of Germany at the 1964 Summer Olympics in the individual épée event.
