= Andrzej Kryński =

Polish fencer

Personal information
- Born: 16 July 1931 Piastów, Poland

Sport
- Sport: Fencing

Andrzej Kryński (16 July 1931 – 16 September 2011) was a Polish former fencer. He competed in the team épée event at the 1960 Summer Olympics.
