= Giovanni Battista Breda =

Italian fencer (1931–1992)

Personal information
- Born: 21 July 1931 Melegnano, Italy
- Died: 13 July 1992 (aged 60)

Sport
- Sport: Fencing
Medal record
Men's fencing
Representing Italy
Olympic Games
Silver medal – second place	1964 Tokyo	Épée, team
Mediterranean Games
Bronze medal – third place	1963 Naples	Individual épée

Giovanni Battista Breda (21 July 1931 – 13 July 1992) was an Italian fencer. He won a silver medal in the team épée event at the 1964 Summer Olympics. He also won a bronze medal at the 1963 Mediterranean Games in the individual épée event.
