= Arnold Chernushevich =

Soviet fencer (1933–1991)

Personal information
- Born: 15 January 1933 Minsk, Belarusian SSR, Soviet Union
- Died: 2 September 1991 (aged 58)

Sport
- Sport: Fencing
Medal record
Men's fencing
Representing Soviet Union
Olympic Games
Bronze medal – third place	1960 Rome	Épée, team

Arnold Chernushevich (Russian: Арнольд Петрович Чернушевич; 15 January 1933 – 2 September 1991) was a Soviet Olympic fencer. He won a bronze medal in the team épée event at the 1960 Summer Olympics.
