= Norbert Brami =

Tunisian fencer (born 1937)

Personal information
- Born: 12 February 1937 (age 89) Tunis, Tunisia

Sport
- Sport: Fencing
Medal record
Mediterranean Games
Bronze medal – third place	1959 Beirut	Individual épée

Norbert Brami (Arabic: نوربرت برامى; born 12 February 1937) is a Tunisian fencer. He competed in the individual foil and épée events at the 1960 Summer Olympics, winning one of nine bouts. He also competed at the 1959 Mediterranean Games where he won a bronze medal in the individual épée event.
