= John Pelling (fencer) =

British fencer (1936–2023)

Personal information
- Nationality: British (English)
- Born: 27 May 1936 London, England
- Died: 14 June 2023 (aged 87)
- Height: 178 cm (5 ft 10 in)
- Weight: 66 kg (146 lb)

Sport
- Sport: Fencing
- Event: Épée
- Club: Grosvenor Fencing Club
Medal record
Men's fencing
Representing Great Britain
Olympic Games
Silver medal – second place	1960 Rome	épée team
Representing England
British Empire & Commonwealth Games
Gold medal – first place	1962 Perth	épée team
Silver medal – second place	1962 Perth	épée individual
Gold medal – first place	1966 Kingston	épée team
Silver medal – second place	1966 Kingston	épée individual

John Albert Pelling (27 May 1936 – 14 June 2023) was a British fencer. He won a silver medal at the 1960 Rome in the épée team event. Pelling died on 14 June 2023, at the age of 87.

== Biography ==
Pelling won a silver medal in the team épée event at the 1960 Summer Olympics.

He represented England and won a gold medal and silver medal in the épée events at the 1962 British Empire and Commonwealth Games in Perth, Western Australia.

Pelling represented the England team at the 1966 British Empire and Commonwealth Games in Kingston, Jamaica, where he participated in the épée events. He won a gold medal in the team épée with Peter Jacobs and Bill Hoskyns, in addition to an individual silver.

Pelling was a twice British fencing champion, winning the épée title at the British Fencing Championships in 1961 and 1965.
