= Adalbert Gurath Sr. =

Romanian fencer

Personal information
- Born: 7 July 1915 Kolozsvár, Austria-Hungary (today Cluj-Napoca, Romania)
- Died: 9 October 1990 (aged 75)

Sport
- Sport: Fencing

Adalbert Gurath Sr. (7 July 1915 – 9 October 1990) was a Romanian fencer. He competed in the individual sabre event at the 1952 Summer Olympics. His son Adalbert Gurath Jr. also represented Romania in fencing at the Olympics.
