= Yves Dreyfus =

French fencer (1931–2021)

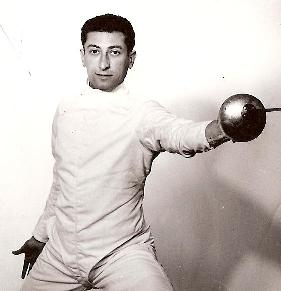
- Yves Dreyfus (1963)

Personal information
- Full name: Yves Jean Jacques Dreyfus
- Nickname: aka Yves Doucet
- Nationality: French
- Born: 17 May 1931 Clermont-Ferrand, France
- Died: 16 December 2021 (aged 90) Ceyrat, Puy-de-Dôme France
- Height: 179 cm (5 ft 10 in)
- Weight: 67 kg (148 lb) (Olympics)

Fencing career
- Sport: Fencing
- Weapon: épée
- Hand: left-handed
Medal record
Men's fencing
Representing France
Men's fencing
Olympic Games
Bronze medal – third place	1956 Melbourne	Epee team
Bronze medal – third place	1964 Tokyo	Epee team
Maccabiah Games
Gold medal – first place	1961 Israel	Individual Epee
Gold medal – first place	1977 Israel	Individual Epee
Gold medal – first place	1977 Israel	Team Epee
Mediterranean Games
Gold medal – first place	1963 Naples	Individual épée

Yves Dreyfus (17 May 1931 – 16 December 2021) was a French epee fencer who won two bronze medals as part of the French Olympic épée team, one in 1956 and one in 1964.

== Life and career ==
Dreyfus was born in Clermont-Ferrand, France, to Raoul Andre Dreyfus and Nelly Caroline Haas on May 17, 1931, and was Jewish. He survived the Nazi occupation of France as a child despite being Jewish by taking the name Yves Doucet. In 1955, he was married to Marie Lise Levy.

=== Olympics ===
Dreyfus was a three-time Olympian for France and won two bronze medals in épée, one in 1956 and one in 1964, competing well but not medaling in 1960.

==== 1956 ====
At the 1956 Olympics in Melbourne at the age of 25 he won a bronze medal in team épée. The French Team defeated Great Britain, but lost to Hungary and Italy.

==== 1960 ====
Though making a good showing, at the 1960 Olympics in Rome at the age of 29 he came in 6th in individual épée but was eliminated in the final round, though he survived the first, and second rounds, as well as the quarter finals, semi-finals and finals. Italian Giuseppe Delfino took the gold in epee, and Alan Jay of Britain the silver. American Albert Axelrod, another Jewish competitor but in Foil, won the bronze in individual competition that year. Dreyfus tied for 9th with the French épée team, putting him out of medal contention.

==== 1964 ====
At the 1964 Olympics in Tokyo at the age of 33 he fenced in the individual épée and won a bronze medal in the team épée. The French epee team defeated Germany in the Quarter Finals, but lost to Hungary 9-3 in the semi-finals. 1960's fencing power Hungary took the team gold with frequent rival Italy the silver.

=== World championships ===
He took an individual bronze in the 1954 World Championships in Luxembourg, taking a total of nine medals in those games. In 1962, he took a bronze individual medal in the World Championships in Buenos Aires. In July 1963, he took a silver medal in the individual épée competition at World Championships at Gdansk, Poland, narrowly defeating Couram Kostava of Russia. At only 19, Romand Locert of Austria won the individual epee gold.

He took team medals in the World Championships, fencing in épée, securing Gold in 1962, 1965, and 1966, and taking silver in 1961, 1963 and 1967. In 1965 at the Paris Worlds, he defeated Henry Hoskyns of Great Britain in the final epee match to help lead his team to the gold, with the British team taking the silver, and the Russian team the bronze.

=== Mediterranean Games, French nationals ===
He won a gold medal at the 1963 Mediterranean Games in the individual épée event. In 1964, he won the French national championship in épée.

=== Maccabiah Games ===
He won a gold medal in individual épée at the 1961 Maccabiah Games. He competed for France at the 1965 Maccabiah Games. He won gold medals in both individual epee and team epee at the 1977 Maccabiah Games.

== Honors ==
In 1966, he was decorated by General Charles de Gaulle. In 1967, he was given the National Order of Merit by the French Council of Ministers. He later became a Master of Arms.

In 2017, he received the Fair Play Award from Alain Calmat, given by the French Association for Sport Without Violence and For Fair Play. Calmat was a Jewish Olympic Figure Skater and World Champion, and lived a life of public service.

Dreyfus died on 16 December 2021, at the age of 90 in Ceyrat, Puy-de-Dôme, France. He wrote three books on fencing in his career, and participated in Masters Fencing as late as 2001.

== See also ==
- List of select Jewish fencers
- List of Jewish Olympic medalists
