= Max Dwinger =

Dutch fencer (born 1943)

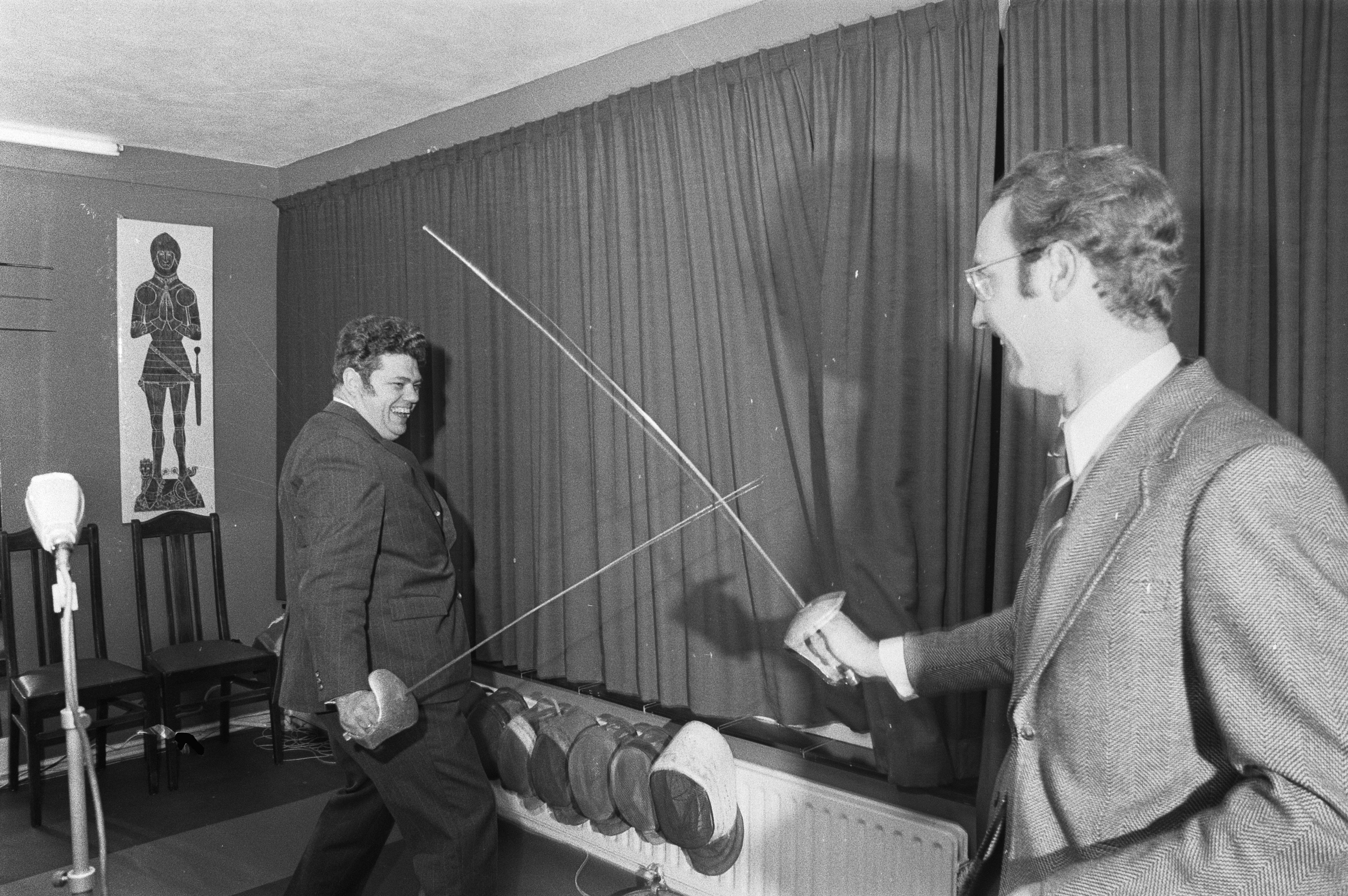
- Henk Vonhoff with Max Dwinger (r.)

Personal information
- Born: 5 December 1943 (age 82) Amsterdam, Netherlands

Sport
- Sport: Fencing

Max Dwinger (born 5 December 1943) is a Dutch fencer. He competed in the individual épée event at the 1960 Summer Olympics. His grandfather fenced at the 1908 Summer Olympics.
