= Ali Annabi =

Tunisian fencer (born 1939)

Personal information
- Full name: Mohamed Ali Annabi
- Born: 6 November 1939 (age 86) Berlin, Germany
- Height: 184 cm (6 ft 0 in)
- Weight: 70 kg (154 lb)

Sport
- Country: Tunisia
- Sport: Fencing
- Event(s): Épée, sabre

Ali Annabi (Arabic: علي عنابي; born 6 November 1939) is a Tunisian fencer. He competed in the individual sabre and épée events at the 1960 Summer Olympics.
