= Osvald Johansson =

Swedish cyclist

Personal information
- Full name: Karl Teodor Osvald Johansson
- Born: 7 October 1932 Uppsala, Sweden
- Died: 20 February 1975 (aged 42) Stockholm, Sweden

Cycling career
- Sport: Cycling

Karl Teodor Osvald Johansson (7 October 1932 – 20 February 1975) was a Swedish cyclist. He competed in the individual road race and team time trial events at the 1960 Summer Olympics.

Johansson represented Djurgårdens IF. He won the 1955 Swedish championship in roadrace.
