= Gunnar Göransson =

Swedish cyclist

Personal information
- Born: 14 July 1933 Norrköping, Sweden
- Died: 22 April 2012 (aged 78) Norrköping, Sweden

Cycling career
- Sport: Cycling

Gunnar Wilhelm Göransson (14 July 1933 – 22 April 2012) was a Swedish cyclist. He competed at the 1956 and 1960 Summer Olympics.

Göransson represented CK Antilopen and Djurgårdens IF. He won the 1958 Swedish championship in roadrace for CK Antilopen.
