= Adalbert Gurath Jr. =

Romanian fencer

Personal information
- Born: 28 April 1942 (age 84) Cluj-Napoca, Romania
- Height: 182 cm (6 ft 0 in)
- Weight: 74 kg (163 lb)

Sport
- Sport: Fencing

Adalbert "Béla" Gurath Jr. (born 28 April 1942) is a retired Romanian fencer. He competed in the individual épée event at the 1960 Summer Olympics. His father, Adalbert Gurath Sr., also represented Romania in fencing at the Olympics.
