= Jules Amez-Droz =

Swiss fencer

Personal information
- Born: 30 June 1921 Zurich, Switzerland
- Died: August 2012 (aged 91)

Sport
- Sport: Fencing

Jules Amez-Droz (30 June 1921 – August 2012) was a Swiss épée and sabre fencer. He competed at the 1952 and 1960 Summer Olympics.
