= Kaj Czarnecki =

Finnish fencer (1936–2018)

Personal information
- Born: 10 September 1936 Helsinki, Finland
- Died: 13 January 2018 (aged 81)

Sport
- Sport: Fencing

Kaj Czarnecki (10 September 1936 – 13 January 2018) was a Finnish fencer. He competed in the individual and team épée events at the 1960 Summer Olympics.
