= Walter Bar =

Swiss fencer

Personal information
- Born: 5 July 1938 (age 88)

Sport
- Sport: Fencing

Walter Bar (born 5 July 1938) is a Swiss fencer. He competed in the individual and team épée events at the 1964 Summer Olympics.
