= Ralph Spinella =

American fencer (1923–2021)

Personal information
- Born: May 8, 1923 Waterbury, Connecticut, U.S.
- Died: October 7, 2021 (aged 98) Waterbury, Connecticut, U.S.

Sport
- Sport: Fencing

Ralph Spinella (May 8, 1923 – October 7, 2021) was an American fencer. He competed in the individual and team épée events at the 1960 Summer Olympics. He went on to coach the fencing club at Trinity College in Hartford, CT.
