= Richard Stone (fencer) =

Australian fencer

Richard Charles Stone
Personal information
- Born: 15 September 1926 London, England
- Died: 5 June 2006 (aged 79) Toowoomba, Australia

Sport
- Sport: Fencing

Richard Charles Stone (15 September 1926 – 5 June 2006) was an Australian fencer. He competed in the individual épée event at the 1956 Summer Olympics and the individual and team épée events at the 1960 Summer Olympics. In later life he was a sportsmaster at the Church of England Grammar School in Brisbane (now the Anglican Church Grammar School).
