= Alberto Pellegrino =

Italian fencer (1930–1996)

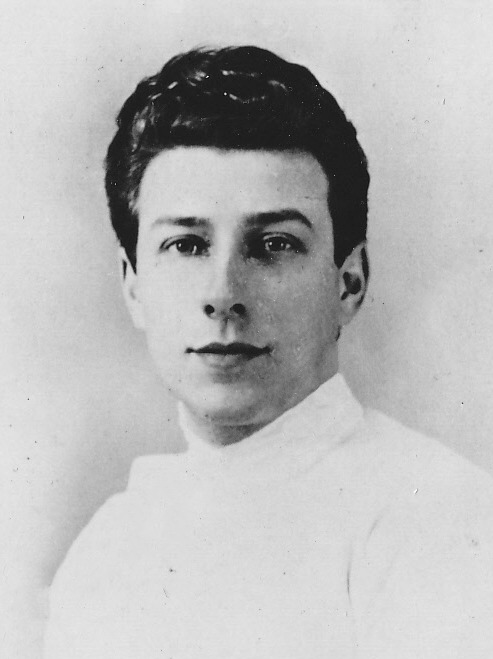

Personal information
- Born: 20 May 1930 Tunis, Tunisia
- Died: 9 March 1996 (aged 65) Milan, Italy
- Height: 1.77 m (5 ft 10 in)
- Weight: 74 kg (163 lb)

Sport
- Sport: Fencing
- Club: SS Cassa di Risparmio, Milan
Medal record
Representing Italy
Olympic Games
Gold medal – first place	1956 Melbourne	Team épée
Gold medal – first place	1960 Rome	Team épée
Silver medal – second place	1960 Rome	Team foil
Silver medal – second place	1964 Tokyo	Team épée
World Championships
Gold medal – first place	1955 Rome	Team épée
Gold medal – first place	1957 Paris	Team épée
Bronze medal – third place	1957 Paris	Team foil
Gold medal – first place	1958 Philadelphia	Team épée
Bronze medal – third place	1958 Philadelphia	Team foil
Summer Universiade
Gold medal – first place	1959 Turin	Team épée

Alberto Pellegrino (20 May 1930 – 9 March 1996) was an Italian fencer. He won two gold and two silver medals with the Italian épée and foil teams at the 1956, 1960 and 1964 Olympic Games.
