= José de Albuquerque =

Portuguese fencer (born 1935)

Personal information
- Born: 20 April 1935 (age 91) Lisbon, Portugal

Sport
- Sport: Fencing

José de Albuquerque (born 20 April 1935) is a Portuguese fencer. He competed in the individual and team épée events at the 1960 Summer Olympics.
