= George Carpenter (fencer) =

Irish fencer

Personal information
- Born: 23 September 1908 Adrigole, Republic of Ireland
- Died: 13 August 2005 (aged 96) Kinsale, Republic of Ireland

Sport
- Sport: Fencing

George Carpenter (23 September 1908 – 13 August 2005) was an Irish épée fencer. He competed at the 1952 and 1960 Summer Olympics.
