= Dieter Fänger =

German fencer

Personal information
- Born: 12 October 1925 Wuppertal, Germany
- Died: 8 March 2016 (aged 90)

Sport
- Sport: Fencing

Dieter Fänger (12 October 1925 – 8 March 2016) was a German fencer. He represented the United Team of Germany at the 1960 Summer Olympics in the individual and team épée events.
