= Pierre Francisse =

Belgian fencer (1924–2012)

Personal information
- Nationality: Belgian
- Born: 11 November 1924 Hainaut, Belgium
- Died: 17 February 2012 (aged 87) Rixensart, Belgium

Sport
- Country: Belgium
- Sport: Fencing

Achievements and titles
- Olympic finals: 1960

Pierre Francisse (11 November 1924 – 17 February 2012) was a Belgian fencer. He competed in the team épée event at the 1960 Summer Olympics.

Francisse had participated in the 1948 (London) Olympics in a track event, but was wounded in Korea severely enough not to be able to compete again. He then took up fencing, and made the Belgian Olympic team at the 1960 Rome Olympic Games. He last served in the First Regiment Guides (Armor), retiring as a colonel.

He served as a lieutenant in the Belgian United Nations Command in the Korean War.
