= Manuel Martínez (fencer) =

Spanish fencer (born 1939)

Personal information
- Born: 6 April 1939 (age 87) Valencia, Spain

Sport
- Sport: Fencing
Medal record
Mediterranean Games
Bronze medal – third place	1959 Beirut	Team épée

Manuel Martínez (born 6 April 1939) is a Spanish fencer. He competed in the individual and team épée events at the 1960 Summer Olympics. He also competed at the 1959 Mediterranean Games where he won a bronze medal in the team épée event.
