= Marcus Leyrer =

Austrian fencer

Personal information
- Born: 13 April 1929
- Died: 22 February 2017 (aged 87)

Sport
- Sport: Fencing

Marcus Leyrer (13 April 1929 – 22 February 2017) was an Austrian fencer. He competed in the individual and team épée events at the 1964 Summer Olympics.
