= Abbes Harchi =

Moroccan fencer (born 1936)

Personal information
- Born: 11 May 1936 (age 90) Casablanca, Morocco

Sport
- Sport: Fencing

Abbes Harchi (Arabic: عباس حرشي; born 11 May 1936) is a Moroccan épée and foil fencer. He competed in three events at the 1960 Summer Olympics.
