= Eddi Gutenkauf =

Luxembourgish fencer (1928–2024)

Personal information
- Born: 6 February 1928 Ettelbruck, Luxembourg
- Died: 19 December 2024 (aged 96)

Sport
- Sport: Fencing

Eddi Gutenkauf (6 February 1928 – 19 December 2024) was a Luxembourgish fencer. He competed in the individual and team épée events at the 1960 Summer Olympics. Gutenkauf died on 19 December 2024, at the age of 96.
