= Ángel Roldán =

Mexican fencer (1915–1977)

Personal information
- Born: 18 January 1915 Mexico City, Mexico
- Died: 17 October 1977 (aged 62)

Sport
- Sport: Fencing

Ángel Roldán (18 January 1915 – 17 October 1977) was a Mexican fencer. He competed in the individual and team épée events at the 1960 Summer Olympics.
