= Tsugeo Ozawa =

Japanese fencer

Personal information
- Born: 6 February 1935 (age 91) Tokyo, Japan

Sport
- Sport: Fencing

Tsugeo Ozawa (Japanese: 小沢 嗣央; born 6 February 1935) is a Japanese épée, foil and sabre fencer. He competed in five events at the 1960 Summer Olympics.
