= José Ferreira (fencer) =

Portuguese fencer (1923–2013)

Personal information
- Full name: José da Silva Pinto Ferreira
- Born: 7 May 1923 Lisbon, Portugal
- Died: 1 July 2013 (aged 90)

Sport
- Sport: Fencing

José da Silva Pinto Ferreira (7 May 1923 – 1 July 2013) was a Portuguese épée and sabre fencer. He competed at the 1952 and 1960 Summer Olympics. Ferreira died on 1 July 2013, at the age of 90.
