= John Simpson (fencer) =

Australian fencer

Personal information
- Born: 16 May 1927 Sydney, Australia
- Died: 1 June 2016 (aged 89)

Sport
- Sport: Fencing
Medal record
Fencing
Representing Australia
British Empire (and Commonwealth) Games
Bronze medal – third place	1958 Cardiff	Men's Team Epee

John Neville Simpson (16 May 1927 – 1 June 2016) was an Australian fencer. He competed in the individual and team épée events at the 1960 Summer Olympics.
