= 1961 World Fencing Championships =

International fencing competition

1961 World Championships in Fencing
- Host city: Turin, Italy

The 1961 World Fencing Championships were held in Turin, Italy.

== Medal table ==
Rank	Nation	Gold	Silver	Bronze	Total
1	Soviet Union (URS)	4	2	2	8
2	Poland (POL)	2	1	2	5
3	France (FRA)	1	1	0	2
4	West Germany (FRG)	1	0	0	1
5	Hungary (HUN)	0	3	2	5
6	Sweden (SWE)	0	1	1	2
7	Romania (ROU)	0	0	1	1
Totals (7 entries)		8	8	8	24

== Medal summary ==
=== Men's events ===
Event	Gold	Silver	Bronze
Individual Foil	(Polish People's Republic) Ryszard Parulski	(Hungarian People's Republic) Jenő Kamuti	(Soviet Union) Mark Midler
Team Foil	Soviet Union	(Hungarian People's Republic) Hungary	(Polish People's Republic) Poland
Individual Sabre	(Soviet Union) Yakov Rylsky	(Polish People's Republic) Emil Ochyra	(Polish People's Republic) Wojciech Zabłocki
Team Sabre	(Polish People's Republic) Poland	Soviet Union	(Hungarian People's Republic) Hungary
Individual Épée	(France) Jack Guittet	(Sweden) Hans Lagerwall	(Hungarian People's Republic) Tamás Gábor
Team Épée	Soviet Union	France	Sweden

=== Women's events ===
Event	Gold	Silver	Bronze
Individual Foil	(West Germany) Heidi Schmid	(Soviet Union) Alexandra Zabelina	(Soviet Union) Valentina Rastvorova
Team Foil	Soviet Union	(Hungarian People's Republic) Hungary	Romania
