= Janusz Kurczab =

Polish fencer (1937–2015)

Personal information
- Born: 6 September 1937 Warsaw, Poland
- Died: 11 April 2015 (aged 77)

Sport
- Sport: Fencing

Janusz Kurczab (6 September 1937 – 11 April 2015) was a Polish fencer, mountaineer and expedition leader. He competed in the individual and team épée events at the 1960 Summer Olympics. Expert in the history of Himalayism, editor of the online climbing website wspinanie.pl. Responsible for the creation of a Central Mountain Archives in the multimedia mountain center "Crown of the Earth" (pl. Centrum Górskie Korona Ziemi) in Zawoja.

Kurczab led a Polish expedition in 1976 that tackled the Northeast ridge of K2. However, the team was not able to summit due to poor weather conditions and failing health among several expedition members.

Beyond his Himalayan expeditions, Kurczab made significant contributions to climbing in the High Tatras and the Alps. In 1962, he was part of the team that established a new route up the Kazalnica pillar in the Tatras, and in 1971 he participated in the first winter ascent of the Grand Pilier d'Angle on Mont Blanc. He later devoted much of his work to documenting and popularising the history of Polish mountaineering, writing numerous books and articles on climbing. His publications included Filar Kazalnicy (1976), Shispare: Góra wyśniona (1976) and Ostatnia bariera. Wyprawa na K2, drugi szczyt świata (1980).
