= Allan Jay =

British fencer (1931–2023)

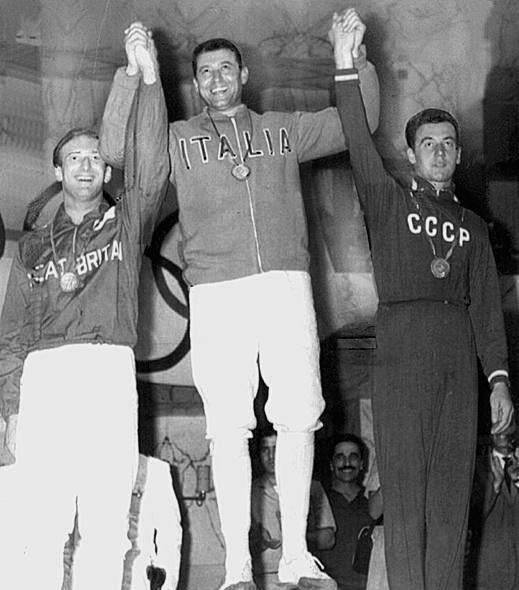
- Jay (left) at the 1960 Olympics

Personal information
- Nationality: British (English)
- Born: 30 June 1931 London, England
- Died: 5 March 2023 (aged 91)
- Height: 175 cm (5 ft 9 in)
- Weight: 80 kg (176 lb)

Sport
- Sport: Fencing
- Events: foil, Épée
- Club: Salle Paul Fencing Club
Medal record
Olympic Games
Representing Great Britain
| Silver medal – second place | 1960 Rome | Épée |
| Silver medal – second place | 1960 Rome | Team épée |
British Empire (and Commonwealth) Games
Representing Australia
| Gold medal – first place | 1950 Auckland | Team épée |
Representing England
| Gold medal – first place | 1954 Vancouver | Team épée |
| Gold medal – first place | 1954 Vancouver | Team foil |
| Bronze medal – third place | 1954 Vancouver | Foil |
| Gold medal – first place | 1958 Cardiff | Team épée |
| Bronze medal – third place | 1958 Cardiff | Épée |
| Gold medal – first place | 1962 Perth | Team foil |
| Silver medal – second place | 1962 Perth | Foil |
| Gold medal – first place | 1966 Kingston | Foil |
| Gold medal – first place | 1966 Kingston | Team foil |

Allan Louis Neville Jay MBE (30 June 1931 – 5 March 2023) was a British five-time-Olympian foil and épée fencer, and world champion.

== Early life ==
Jay was born in London, England, and was Jewish. His father died fighting in World War II in 1943. He attended Cheltenham College from 1944 to 1948. He spent much of his childhood in Australia. After 1950 he returned to Britain to study law at the University of Oxford, and later worked as a solicitor while serving as fencing official with the Fédération Internationale d'Escrime. Jay and his wife Carole have two children.

== Fencing career ==
Jay competed internationally in 1950 for Australia. He was a five times British champion winning five titles at the British Fencing Championships, épée champion in 1952, 1959, 1960, and 1961, and foil champion in 1963. Jay competed in five Olympics in both épée and foil, winning silver medals at the 1960 Rome Olympics in individual and team épée. He was Great Britain's flag bearer in the 1964 Olympic Games.

At the World Fencing Championships, Jay won a bronze medal in team foil in 1955, a bronze medal in individual foil in 1957, and a gold medal in individual foil while also winning a silver medal in individual épée in 1959, becoming the first British world champion in foil and the last fencer to win two individual medals in one year.

Jay won a gold medal in épée at the 1950 Maccabiah Games. He won three gold medals while fencing both foil and épée (where he won the gold medal in 1953, defeating American Ralph Goldstein in the final) at each of the 1953 Maccabiah Games and the 1957 Maccabiah Games. He is a member of the International Jewish Sports Hall of Fame, having been elected in 1985.

His last Commonwealth Games appearance came when Jay represented the England team at the 1966 British Empire and Commonwealth Games in Kingston, Jamaica, where he participated in the foil events. He won double gold medal in the individual foil and team foil, the latter with Graham Paul and Bill Hoskyns.

== Death ==
Jay died from COVID-19 on 5 March 2023, at the age of 91.

== See also ==
- List of athletes with the most appearances at Olympic Games
- List of select Jewish fencers
- List of Jewish Olympic medalists
