= Pedro Cabrera =

Spanish fencer

Personal information
- Born: 26 April 1927 Valencia, Spain

Sport
- Sport: Fencing
Medal record
Mediterranean Games
Bronze medal – third place	1959 Beirut	Team épée

Pedro Cabrera (born 26 April 1927) is a Spanish fencer. He competed in the individual and team épée events at the 1960 Summer Olympics. He competed at the 1959 Mediterranean Games where he won a bronze medal in the team épée event.
