= Jesús Díez =

Spanish fencer (1931–2003)

Personal information
- Full name: Jesús Díez Pinillos
- Born: 31 May 1931 Madrid, Spain
- Died: 28 March 2003 (aged 71)

Sport
- Country: Spain
- Sport: Fencing
Medal record
Mediterranean Games
Bronze medal – third place	1959 Beirut	Team épée

Jesús Díez Pinillos (31 May 1931 – 28 March 2003) was a Spanish epee, foil and sabre fencer. He competed in four events at the 1960 Summer Olympics. He competed at the 1959 Mediterranean Games where he won a bronze medal in the team épée event.
