= Georg Neuber =

German fencer (1925–2022)

Personal information
- Born: 11 December 1925 Königsberg, Germany
- Died: 6 April 2022 (aged 96)

Sport
- Sport: Fencing

Georg Neuber (11 December 1925 – 6 April 2022) was a German fencer. He represented the United Team of Germany at the 1960 Summer Olympics in the individual and team épée events.

Neuber died on 6 April 2022, at the age of 96.
