= José Fernandes (fencer) =

Portuguese fencer

Personal information
- Born: 12 September 1934 (age 91) Lisbon, Portugal

Sport
- Sport: Fencing

José Fernandes (born 12 September 1934) is a Portuguese épée and sabre fencer. He competed in three events at the 1960 Summer Olympics.
