= Guram Kostava =

Soviet fencer (1937–2024)

Personal information
- Born: 18 June 1937 Tbilisi, Georgian SSR, USSR
- Died: 20 June 2024 (aged 87)

Sport
- Sport: Fencing
Medal record
Men's fencing
Representing Soviet Union
Olympic Games
| Bronze medal – third place | 1960 Rome | Épée, team |
| Bronze medal – third place | 1964 Tokyo | Épée, individual |

Guram Kostava (Georgian: გურამ კოსტავა; 18 June 1937 – 20 June 2024) was a Soviet fencer. Kostava won a bronze in the team épée event at the 1960 Summer Olympics and another one in the individual épée event at the 1964 Summer Olympics. Kostava died on 20 June 2024, at the age of 87.
