= James Margolis =

American fencer (1936–2025)

Personal information
- Full name: James Arthur Margolis
- Born: July 17, 1936 New York, New York, U.S.
- Died: May 13, 2025 (aged 88) White Plains, New York, U.S.

Sport
- Sport: Fencing
- Event: Epee
- College team: Columbia University

James Arthur Margolis (July 17, 1936 – May 13, 2025) was an American Olympic épée fencer.

== Early life ==
Margolis was born in New York, New York, and is Jewish. His brother Don also fenced for Columbia University, coming in third in the NCAA nationals in épée in 1963. He later lived in Teaneck, New Jersey.

== Fencing career ==
He fenced for the Columbia Lions fencing team. Margolis was the 1957 NCAA épée champion, as well as the 1957 IFA champion, fencing as a junior for Columbia University, from which he graduated in 1958. He was All-Ivy League in 1957 and 1958, All-American in 1957, and Eastern Champion in épée in 1957. He then joined the U.S. Navy, and became a Lieutenant.

In 1960, Margolis placed third in epee at the Amateur Fencers League of America (AFLA) national tournament.

Margolis also competed on behalf of the United States in the individual and team épée events at the 1960 Summer Olympics in Rome. He was the Ivy League's first Olympian in fencing.

He competed in the 1960 Pan American Games. Margolis won a gold medal in team épée at the 1963 Pan American Games.

Margolis was inducted into the Columbia University Athletics Hall of Fame.

After his fencing career concluded, Margolis worked in the life insurance business for 40 years, and served as manager at the Brookline Emergency Food Pantry, a food shelter for individuals, families, and seniors in need.

== Death ==
Margolis died on May 13, 2025 in White Plains, New York, at the age of 88.

== See also ==
- List of NCAA fencing champions
