= Keith Hackshall =

Australian fencer

Personal information
- Born: 23 December 1927 Sydney, Australia
- Died: 21 February 1992 (aged 64) Kogarah Bay, Australia

Sport
- Sport: Fencing

Keith Hackshall (23 December 1927 – 21 February 1992) was an Australian fencer. He competed at the 1956 and 1960 Summer Olympics.
