= Sergio Jiménez (fencer) =

Chilean fencer

Personal information
- Born: October 19, 1940 (age 85)

Sport
- Sport: Fencing

Sergio Jiménez (born 19 October 1940) is a Chilean fencer. He competed in the individual épée event at the 1964 Summer Olympics.
