= Kalevi Pakarinen =

Finnish fencer

Personal information
- Born: 27 November 1935 Helsinki, Finland
- Died: 19 May 1999 (aged 63) Helsinki, Finland

Sport
- Sport: Fencing

Kalevi Pakarinen (27 November 1935 – 19 May 1999) was a Finnish fencer. He competed in the individual and team épée events at the 1960 Summer Olympics.
