= François Dehez =

Belgian fencer

Personal information
- Born: 6 November 1931 Sainte-Marie-Chevigny, Belgium
- Died: 18 July 2017 (aged 85) Evere, Belgium

Sport
- Sport: Fencing

François Dehez (6 November 1931 – 18 July 2017) was a Belgian fencer. He competed at the 1956 and 1960 Summer Olympics.
