= Wiesław Glos =

Polish fencer (1936–2021)

Personal information
- Born: 12 September 1936 Kraków, Poland
- Died: 6 January 2021 (aged 84) Kraków, Poland

Sport
- Sport: Fencing
Medal record
Representing Poland
Summer Universiade
Silver medal – second place	1959 Turin	Team épée

Wiesław Albin Glos (12 September 1936 – 6 January 2021) was a Polish fencer. He competed at the 1960 and 1964 Summer Olympics.
