= Berndt-Otto Rehbinder =

Swedish fencer (1918–1974)

Personal information
- Born: 1 May 1918 Karlskrona, Sweden
- Died: 12 December 1974 (aged 56) Norrbotten, Sweden

Sport
- Sport: Fencing
Medal record
Men's fencing
Representing Sweden
Olympic Games
Silver medal – second place	1952 Helsinki	Épée, team

Berndt-Otto Rehbinder (1 May 1918 – 12 December 1974) was a Swedish fencer. He won a silver medal in the team épée event at the 1952 Summer Olympics.
