= Sonosuke Fujimaki =

Japanese fencer

Personal information
- Born: 10 January 1939 (age 87) Kanagawa Prefecture, Japan

Sport
- Sport: Fencing

Sonosuke Fujimaki (Japanese: 藤巻 惣之助; born 10 January 1939) is a Japanese épée and sabre fencer. He competed in four events at the 1960 Summer Olympics.
