= Carl-Wilhelm Engdahl =

Swedish fencer

Personal information
- Born: 16 July 1926 Växjö, Sweden
- Died: 13 October 2012 (aged 86) Nyköping, Sweden

Sport
- Sport: Fencing

Carl-Wilhelm Engdahl (16 July 1926 – 13 October 2012) was a Swedish fencer. He competed in the team épée events at the 1960 and 1964 Summer Olympics.
