= Giuseppe Delfino =

Italian fencer (1921–1999)

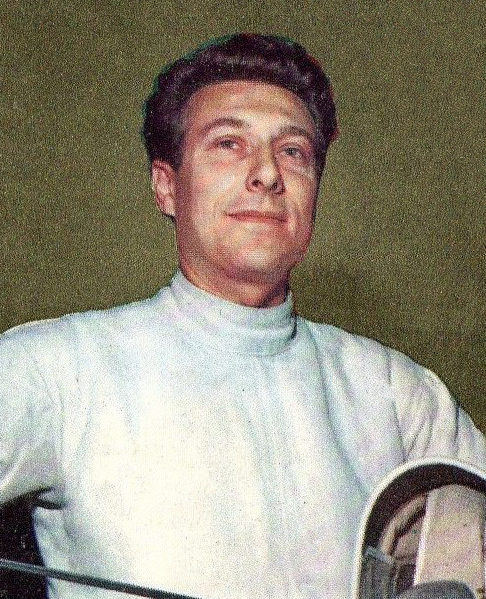

Personal information
- Born: 22 November 1921 Turin, Italy
- Died: 10 August 1999 (aged 77) Turin, Italy

Sport
- Country: Italy
- Sport: Fencing
Medal record
Men's fencing
Olympic Games
Gold medal – first place	1952 Helsinki	Épée Team
Gold medal – first place	1956 Melbourne	Épée Team
Gold medal – first place	1960 Rome	Épée Individual
Gold medal – first place	1960 Rome	Épée Team
Silver medal – second place	1956 Melbourne	Épée Individual
Silver medal – second place	1964 Tokyo	Épée Team
Mediterranean Games
Silver medal – second place	1955 Barcelona	Individual épée
Silver medal – second place	1955 Barcelona	Team épée

Giuseppe Delfino (22 November 1921 – 10 August 1999) was an Italian fencer and Olympic champion in épée competition.

== Biography ==
He won a gold medal in the épée individual event at the 1960 Summer Olympics in Rome. He won Olympic gold medals in the épée team events in 1952, 1956 and 1960, and silver in 1964.

He also competed at the 1955 Mediterranean Games where he won silver medals in the individual and team épée events.

== See also ==
- Italian athletes with most Olympic medals
- Italian fencer multiple medallists at the Olympics
- Legends of Italian sport - Walk of Fame

Summer Olympics
Preceded by Edoardo Mangiarotti	Flag bearer for Italy; 1964 Tokyo	Succeeded by Raimondo D'Inzeo
