= John Humphreys (fencer) =

Australian fencer

Personal information
- Nationality: Australian
- Born: 15 March 1932 Springsure, Queensland, Australia
- Died: 14 September 2017 (aged 85)
- Height: 183 cm (6 ft 0 in)
- Weight: 85 kg (187 lb)

Sport
- Country: Australia
- Sport: Fencing
- Retired: Yes
Medal record
Fencing
Representing Australia
British Empire Games
Silver medal – second place	1962 Perth	Men's Team Epee
Silver medal – second place	1966 Kingston	Men's Team Foil
Bronze medal – third place	1966 Kingston	Men's Team Epee

John Douglas Humphreys (15 March 1932 – 14 September 2017) was an Australian fencer. He competed at the 1960 and 1964 Summer Olympics.
