= Roger Achten =

Belgian fencer

Personal information
- Born: 20 December 1927 Herzele, Belgium
- Died: 10 April 2004 (aged 76) Hasselt, Belgium

Sport
- Sport: Fencing

Roger Achten (20 December 1927 – 10 April 2004) was a Belgian fencer. He competed in the individual and team épée events at the 1956 and 1960 Summer Olympics.
