= Bill Hoskyns =

British fencer (1931–2013)

Bill Hoskyns MBE
Personal information
- Nationality: British (English)
- Born: 19 March 1931 London, England
- Died: 4 August 2013 (aged 82)

Sport
- Sport: Fencing
- Event(s): Épée, Sabre
- Club: Lansdowne Club
Medal record
Men's fencing
Representing Great Britain
Olympic Games
Silver medal – second place	1960 Rome	Team épée
Silver medal – second place	1964 Tokyo	Individual épée
Representing England
British Empire & Commonwealth Games
Gold medal – first place	1958 Cardiff	épée individual
Gold medal – first place	1958 Cardiff	épée team
Gold medal – first place	1958 Cardiff	sabre individual
Gold medal – first place	1958 Cardiff	sabre team
Gold medal – first place	1966 Kingston	épée individual
Gold medal – first place	1966 Kingston	épée team
Gold medal – first place	1966 Kingston	foil team
Silver medal – second place	1966 Kingston	foil individual
Gold medal – first place	1970 Edinburgh	épée individual
Gold medal – first place	1970 Edinburgh	épée team

Henry William Furse Hoskyns MBE (19 March 1931 – 4 August 2013) was a British fencer who appeared at six Olympic Games.,

== Biography ==
Hoskyns, born in London won two silver medals in 1960 and 1964 Olympic Games. No British fencer has won an Olympic medal since. He competed with all three weapons (doing so in the 1956 and 1964 Olympics) but he was especially effective at Épée, where he was 1958 World Champion. He is one of only five fencers to compete in at least six Olympic Games.

He was eight times British champion, winning three foil, four epee and one sabre title at the British Fencing Championships. Only Edgar Seligman had previously achieved winning the British title with the three different weapons and his great rival, Allan Jay failed to win the sabre title.

During the time (1950 to 1970) that fencing was a sport at the Commonwealth Games, Hoskyns won nine gold (four individual) and one silver medal. He won four golds for the England team at the 1958 British Empire and Commonwealth Games in Cardiff, Wales.

He also three gold medals and one silver at the 1966 British Empire and Commonwealth Games and double gold at the 1970 Commonwealth Games.

At the 1960 Summer Olympics in Rome, he was part of the British silver medal-winning épée team. At the 1964 Summer Olympics in Tokyo, Hoskyns won silver in the épée, losing to Soviet fencer Grigory Kriss in the final.

== See also ==
- List of athletes with the most appearances at Olympic Games
