= David Micahnik =

American fencer

Personal information
- Born: 5 November 1938 Hazleton, Pennsylvania, U.S.
- Died: 4 January 2025 (aged 86)

Sport
- Country: USA
- Sport: Fencing
- Event: Epee
- College team: University of Pennsylvania Quakers

David Micahnik (born November 5, 1938) was an American fencer and fencing coach. He was born in Hazleton, Pennsylvania.

== Biography ==
Micahnik attended the University of Pennsylvania (1959), fencing for the University of Pennsylvania Quakers, and was a first-team All-Ivy selection in epee as a senior. He was the 1960 U.S. National Champion.

He competed in the individual and team épée events at the 1960, 1964 and 1968 Summer Olympics.

Micahnik won the individual epee title and took second in foil, and won gold medals with the epee and foil teams, at the 1965 Maccabiah Games. He again won the individual and team gold medals in epee at the 1969 Maccabiah Games. He coached the U.S. fencing teams at the 1985 Maccabiah Games and the 1993 Maccabiah Games.

== Halls of fame ==
Micahnik is a member of the USFA Hall of Fame. He is also a member of the Philadelphia Jewish Sports Hall of Fame and Penn Athletics Hall of Fame.
