= Jack Guittet =

French fencer (1930–2025)

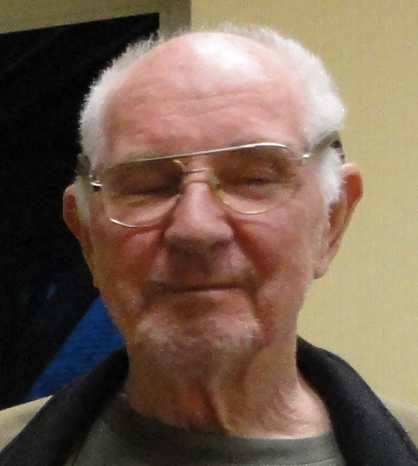

Personal information
- Born: Jacques Guittet; 12 January 1930 Casablanca, French protectorate in Morocco
- Died: 16 January 2025 (aged 95) Mignaloux-Beauvoir, France

Sport
- Sport: Fencing
Medal record
Men's fencing
Representing France
Olympic Games
Bronze medal – third place	1964 Tokyo	Épée, team
Mediterranean Games
Gold medal – first place	1959 Beirut	Individual épée
Gold medal – first place	1959 Beirut	Team épée
Gold medal – first place	1959 Beirut	Team foil

Jack Guittet (12 January 1930 – 16 January 2025) was a French fencer. He won a bronze medal in the team épée event at the 1964 Summer Olympics. He also competed at the 1959 Mediterranean Games where he won gold medals in the individual épée and team épée and foil events. He was president of the French Fencing Federation from 1977 to 1981. Guittet died on 16 January 2025, at the age of 95.
