= René Van Den Driessche =

Belgian fencer (born 1928)

Personal information
- Born: 14 August 1928 Uccle, Belgium

Sport
- Sport: Fencing

René Van Den Driessche (born 14 August 1928) is a Belgian fencer. He competed at the 1960 and 1964 Summer Olympics.
