= Claudio Polledri =

Swiss fencer

Personal information
- Born: 7 January 1936 Lugano, Switzerland
- Died: 13 September 2002 (aged 66)

Sport
- Sport: Fencing

Claudio Polledri (7 January 1936-13 September 2002) was a Swiss épée and foil fencer. He competed at the 1960 and 1964 Summer Olympics.
