= Göran Abrahamsson =

Swedish fencer (1931–2018)

Personal information
- Born: 19 September 1931 Gothenburg, Sweden
- Died: 6 March 2018 (aged 86) Gothenburg, Sweden

Sport
- Sport: Fencing
Medal record
Representing Sweden
World Championships
Silver medal – second place	1962 Buenos Aires	Team épée
Bronze medal – third place	1961 Turin	Team épée
Summer Universiade
Bronze medal – third place	1959 Turin	Individual épée

Karl Göran Abrahamsson (19 September 1931 – 6 March 2018) was a Swedish épée and foil fencer. He competed at the 1960 and 1964 Summer Olympics.

== Awards ==
- (Sweden) Swedish Fencing Federation Royal Medal of Merit in gold (Svenska fäktförbundets kungliga förtjänstmedalj i guld) (2002)
