= Paul Gnaier =

German fencer

Personal information
- Born: 8 March 1926 Baden-Württemberg, Weimar Republic
- Died: 25 November 2013 (aged 87)

Sport
- Sport: Fencing

Paul Karl Rudolf Gnaier (8 March 1926 – 25 November 2013) was a German fencer and sports official. He represented the United Team of Germany in 1960 and 1964 and West Germany in 1968.
