= Hans Lagerwall =

Swedish fencer (1941–2022)

Personal information
- Born: 1 March 1941 Gothenburg, Sweden
- Died: 5 October 2022 (aged 81) Gothenburg, Sweden

Sport
- Sport: Fencing

Hans Lagerwall (1 March 1941 – 5 October 2022) was a Swedish épée and foil fencer. He competed at the 1960 and 1964 Summer Olympics. Lagerwall died on 5 October 2022, at the age of 81.
