= Fencing at the 1968 Summer Olympics – Men's épée =

Fencing at the Olympics

Men's épée at the Games of the XIX Olympiad
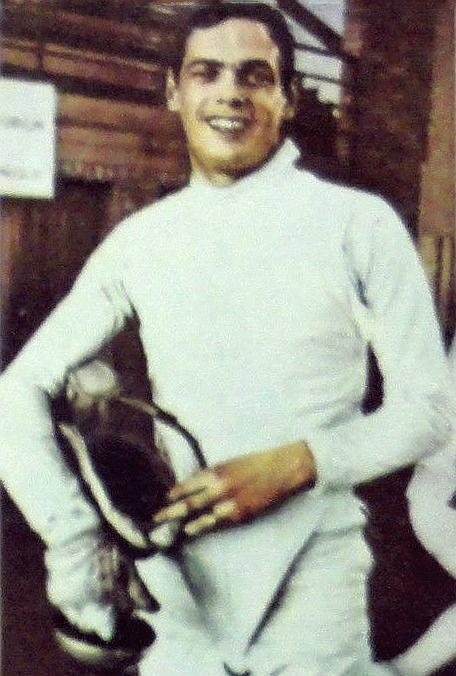
- Győző Kulcsár (1970)
- Venue: Fernando Montes de Oca Fencing Hall
- Dates: 21–22 October
- Competitors: 72 from 28 nations

Medalists
1st place, gold medalist(s)		Győző Kulcsár; Hungary
2nd place, silver medalist(s)		Grigory Kriss; Soviet Union
3rd place, bronze medalist(s)		Gianluigi Saccaro; Italy

The men's épée was one of eight fencing events on the fencing at the 1968 Summer Olympics programme. It was the fifteenth appearance of the event. The competition was held from 21 to 22 October 1968. 72 fencers from 28 nations competed. Each nation was limited to three fencers. The event was won by Győző Kulcsár of Hungary, the nation's first medal in the men's individual épée. Defending gold medalist Grigory Kriss of the Soviet Union took silver, becoming the eighth man to win multiple medals in the event and extending the Soviet podium streak to three Games. Italy returned to the podium as well after a one-Games absence broke its six-Games gold medal streak, with Gianluigi Saccaro (who came within a barrage of a medal in 1964) earning bronze.

== Background ==
This was the 15th appearance of the event, which was not held at the first Games in 1896 (with only foil and sabre events held) but has been held at every Summer Olympics since 1900.

Seven of the eight quarterfinalists from the 1964 Games returned: gold medalist Grigory Kriss of the Soviet Union, silver medalist Bill Hoskyns of Great Britain, fourth-place finisher Gianluigi Saccaro of Italy, fifth-place finisher Bogdan Gonsior of Poland, sixth-place finisher Claude Bourquard of France, and seventh-place finishers Orvar Lindwall of Sweden and Franz Rompza of the United Team of Germany (now competing for West Germany). Hoskyns (1958) was a former World Champion, as were Roland Losert of Austria (1963) and Zoltán Nemere of Hungary (1965); Kriss would win in 1971. The two-time reigning World Champion (1966 and 1967) was Aleksey Nikanchikov of the Soviet Union.

Puerto Rico made its debut in the event. East Germany and West Germany competed separately for the first time. Belgium and the United States each appeared for the 14th time, tied for most among nations.

== Competition format ==
The 1968 tournament continued to use a mix of pool play and knockout rounds, but with substantial changes from 1964. The first two rounds were round-robin pool play, followed by a knockout round, finishing with another pool for the final. Early-round barrages were eliminated and the knockout round was a modified double elimination round.

- Round 1: 12 pools, with 6 or 7 fencers in each pool (one pool had 5 due to a withdrawal). The top 4 fencers in each pool advanced, cutting the field from 72 to 48.
- Round 2: 8 pools, with 6 fencers per pool. Again, the top 4 fencers advanced, reducing the number of remaining fencers from 48 to 32.
- Knockout round: This was a modified double-elimination tournament. The 32 fencers were divided into 4 groups of 8. The winner of the "winners bracket" in each group advanced to the final pool. The winner of the "losers bracket" from each group faced the winner of a different group's "losers bracket," with the winner of that match advancing to the final pool as well. The knockout round winnowed the fencers from 32 to 6.
- Final round: A final pool with the 6 remaining fencers determined the medals and 4th through 6th place. A barrage was used if necessary.

== Schedule ==
All times are Central Standard Time (UTC-6)

Date	Time	Round
Monday, 21 October 1968	8:00	Round 1 Round 2
Tuesday, 22 October 1968	10:00	Knockout rounds Final

== Results ==
=== Round 1 ===
==== Round 1 Pool A ====
Pos	Fencer	W	L	TF	TA	Qual.	AN	HP	EF	KD	AZE	MR
1	Aleksey Nikanchikov (URS)	5	0	25	9	Q		1–0	1–0	1–0	1–0	1–0
2	Herbert Polzhuber (AUT)	4	1	24	17	Q	0–1		1–0	1–0	1–0	1–0
3	Ernesto Fernández (MEX)	2	3	15	18	Q	0–1	0–1		1–0	0–1	1–0
4	Klaus Dumke (GDR)	2	3	19	21	Q	0–1	0–1	0–1		1–0	1–0
5	Ahmed Zein El-Abidin (EGY)	2	3	17	21		0–1	0–1	1–0	0–1		1–0
6	Michael Ryan (IRL)	0	5	11	25		0–1	0–1	0–1	0–1	0–1	

Source: Official Report, vol. 3, p. 641

==== Round 1 Pool B ====
Pos	Fencer	W	L	TF	TA	Qual.	FR	DM	GK	PB	AC	JAD
1	Franz Rompza (FRG)	5	0	25	15	Q		1–0	1–0	1–0	1–0	1–0
2	David Micahnik (USA)	3	2	19	16	Q	0–1		0–1	1–0	1–0	1–0
3	Grigory Kriss (URS)	3	2	20	18	Q	0–1	1–0		1–0	1–0	0–1
4	Peter Bakonyi (CAN)	2	3	21	19	Q	0–1	0–1	0–1		1–0	1–0
5	Ali Chekr (LIB)	1	4	14	21		0–1	0–1	0–1	0–1		1–0
6	José Antonio Díaz (CUB)	1	4	13	23		0–1	0–1	1–0	0–1	0–1	

Source: Official Report, vol. 3, p. 641

==== Round 1 Pool C ====
Pos	Fencer	W	L	TF	TA	Qual.	RL	OV	JLD	SF	JP	DA
1	Roland Losert (AUT)	5	0	25	10	Q		1–0	1–0	1–0	1–0	1–0
2	Omar Vergara (ARG)	3	2	20	17	Q	0–1		1–0	0–1	1–0	1–0
3	Jacques La Degaillerie (FRA)	2	3	16	18	Q	0–1	0–1		1–0	1–0	0–1
4	Silvio Fernández (VEN)	2	3	16	19	Q	0–1	1–0	0–1		0–1	1–0
5	José Pinheiro (POR)	2	3	15	23		0–1	0–1	0–1	1–0		1–0
6	Darío Amaral (BRA)	1	4	17	22		0–1	0–1	1–0	0–1	0–1	

Source: Official Report, vol. 3, p. 641

==== Round 1 Pool D ====
Pos	Fencer	W	L	TF	TA	Qual.	CF	GP	VP	SH	RH	FdS	JMP
1	Csaba Fenyvesi (HUN)	6	0	30	11	Q		1–0	1–0	1–0	1–0	1–0	1–0
2	Gianfranco Paolucci (ITA)	4	2	26	21	Q	0–1		1–0	1–0	1–0	0–1	1–0
3	Valeriano Pérez (MEX)	3	3	25	22	Q	0–1	0–1		0–1	1–0	1–0	1–0
4	Ștefan Haukler (ROU)	3	3	24	23	Q	0–1	0–1	1–0		0–1	1–0	1–0
5	Russell Hobby (AUS)	3	3	23	23		0–1	0–1	0–1	1–0		1–0	1–0
6	Francisco da Silva (POR)	2	4	20	24		0–1	1–0	0–1	0–1	0–1		1–0
7	José Miguel Pérez (PUR)	0	6	6	30		0–1	0–1	0–1	0–1	0–1	0–1	

Source: Official Report, vol. 3, p. 642

==== Round 1 Pool E ====
Pos	Fencer	W	L	TF	TA	Qual.	MC	RT	BA	AB	KK	GJ
1	Michel Constandt (BEL)	4	1	23	14	Q		1–0	0–1	1–0	1–0	1–0
2	Rudolf Trost (AUT)	4	1	24	21	Q	0–1		1–0	1–0	1–0	1–0
3	Bohdan Andrzejewski (POL)	3	2	23	17	Q	1–0	0–1		0–1	1–0	1–0
4	Alexandre Bretholz (SUI)	2	3	19	23	Q	0–1	0–1	1–0		0–1	1–0
5	Khalil Kallas (LIB)	1	4	18	22		0–1	0–1	0–1	1–0		0–1
6	Graeme Jennings (AUS)	1	4	14	24		0–1	0–1	0–1	0–1	1–0	

Source: Official Report, vol. 3, p. 642

==== Round 1 Pool F ====
Pos	Fencer	W	L	TF	TA	Qual.	RJ	BG	PL	FB	BR	GO
1	Ralph Johnson (GBR)	4	1	20	14	Q		1–0	0–1	1–0	1–0	1–0
2	Bogdan Gonsior (POL)	3	2	20	13	Q	0–1		1–0	1–0	0–1	1–0
3	Peter Lötscher (SUI)	3	2	21	16	Q	1–0	0–1		1–0	1–0	0–1
4	Florent Bessemans (BEL)	2	3	15	19	Q	0–1	0–1	0–1		1–0	1–0
5	Bill Ronald (AUS)	2	3	18	20		0–1	1–0	0–1	0–1		1–0
6	Guillermo Obeid (ARG)	1	4	12	24		0–1	0–1	1–0	0–1	0–1	

Source: Official Report, vol. 3, p. 642

==== Round 1 Pool G ====
Pos	Fencer	W	L	TF	TA	Qual.	GK	HPS	HN	SN	JdA	AB
1	Győző Kulcsár (HUN)	5	0	25	12	Q		1–0	1–0	1–0	1–0	1–0
2	Hans-Peter Schulze (GDR)	4	1	23	17	Q	0–1		1–0	1–0	1–0	1–0
3	Henryk Nielaba (POL)	2	3	18	16	Q	0–1	0–1		0–1	1–0	1–0
4	Stephen Netburn (USA)	2	3	18	21	Q	0–1	0–1	1–0		1–0	0–1
5	João de Abreu (POR)	1	4	15	22		0–1	0–1	0–1	0–1		1–0
6	Alberto Balestrini (ARG)	1	4	13	24		0–1	0–1	0–1	1–0	0–1	

Source: Official Report, vol. 3, p. 642

==== Round 1 Pool H ====
Pos	Fencer	W	L	TF	TA	Qual.	PP	GS	OL	CC	DM	TM
1	Paul Pesthy (USA)	4	1	20	16	Q		1–0	1–0	0–1	1–0	1–0
2	Gianluigi Saccaro (ITA)	3	2	20	11	Q	0–1		0–1	1–0	1–0	1–0
3	Orvar Lindwall (SWE)	3	2	21	16	Q	0–1	1–0		1–0	0–1	1–0
4	Carlos Couto (BRA)	3	2	17	16	Q	1–0	0–1	0–1		1–0	1–0
5	Dag Midling (NOR)	2	3	15	22		0–1	0–1	1–0	0–1		1–0
6	Tănase Mureșanu (ROU)	0	5	13	25		0–1	0–1	0–1	0–1	0–1	

Source: Official Report, vol. 3, p. 642

==== Round 1 Pool I ====
Pos	Fencer	W	L	TF	TA	Qual.	BH	HF	JPA	MC	DS	MG
1	Bill Hoskyns (GBR)	4	1	21	19	Q		1–0	1–0	1–0	0–1	1–0
2	Harry Fiedler (GDR)	3	2	19	14	Q	0–1		0–1	1–0	1–0	1–0
3	Jean-Pierre Allemand (FRA)	3	2	22	16	Q	0–1	1–0		0–1	1–0	1–0
4	Magdy Conyd (CAN)	3	2	19	17	Q	0–1	0–1	1–0		1–0	1–0
5	Dicki Sörensen (SWE)	2	3	17	18		1–0	0–1	0–1	0–1		1–0
6	Manuel González (CUB)	0	5	11	25		0–1	0–1	0–1	0–1	0–1	

Source: Official Report, vol. 3, p. 642

==== Round 1 Pool J ====
Pos	Fencer	W	L	TF	TA	Qual.	ZN	LEL	GO	CO	CB	FP
1	Zoltán Nemere (HUN)	4	1	21	13	Q		0–1	1–0	1–0	1–0	1–0
2	Lars-Erik Larsson (SWE)	4	1	24	14	Q	1–0		1–0	1–0	0–1	1–0
3	Gustavo Oliveros (CUB)	2	3	18	20	Q	0–1	0–1		1–0	0–1	1–0
4	Colm O'Brien (IRL)	2	3	18	21	Q	0–1	0–1	0–1		1–0	1–0
5	Claude Bourquard (FRA)	2	3	19	22		0–1	1–0	1–0	0–1		0–1
6	Félix Piñero (VEN)	1	4	14	24		0–1	0–1	0–1	0–1	1–0	

Source: Official Report, vol. 3, p. 642

==== Round 1 Pool K ====
John Bouchier-Hayes of Ireland was entered in this pool but did not compete.

Pos	Fencer	W	L	TF	TA	Qual.	FZ	JvK	MS	CF	GW
1	Fritz Zimmermann (FRG)	3	1	17	14	Q		–0	1–0	0–1	1–0
2	Jan von Koss (NOR)	2	2	18	14	Q	0–1		0–1	1–0	1–0
3	Michel Steininger (SUI)	2	2	18	16	Q	0–1	1–0		0–1	1–0
4	Claudio Francesconi (ITA)	2	2	15	16	Q	1–0	0–1	1–0		0–1
5	Gerry Wiedel (CAN)	1	3	10	18		0–1	0–1	0–1	1–0	

Source: Official Report, vol. 3, p. 642

==== Round 1 Pool L ====
Pos	Fencer	W	L	TF	TA	Qual.	DJ	VM	NH	CC	AR	AV
1	Dieter Jung (FRG)	4	1	23	10	Q		0–1	1–0	1–0	1–0	1–0
2	Viktor Modzolevsky (URS)	3	2	23	16	Q	1–0		0–1	1–0	0–1	1–0
3	Nick Halsted (GBR)	3	2	20	21	Q	0–1	1–0		0–1	1–0	1–0
4	Carlos Calderón (MEX)	2	3	14	22	Q	0–1	0–1	1–0		1–0	0–1
5	Arthur Ribeiro (BRA)	2	3	18	23		0–1	1–0	0–1	0–1		1–0
6	Alberto Varela (URU)	1	4	16	22		0–1	0–1	0–1	1–0	0–1	

Source: Official Report, vol. 3, p. 642

=== Round 2 ===
==== Round 2 Pool A ====
Pos	Fencer	W	L	TF	TA	Qual.	AN	JPA	GS	PB	HF	VP
1	Aleksey Nikanchikov (URS)	4	1	25	15	Q		0–1	1–0	1–0	1–0	1–0
2	Jean-Pierre Allemand (FRA)	4	1	24	15	Q	1–0		0–1	1–0	1–0	1–0
3	Gianluigi Saccaro (ITA)	3	2	22	18	Q	0–1	1–0		0–1	1–0	1–0
4	Peter Bakonyi (CAN)	2	3	18	21	Q	0–1	0–1	1–0		1–0	0–1
5	Harry Fiedler (GDR)	1	4	14	21		0–1	0–1	0–1	0–1		1–0
6	Valeriano Pérez (MEX)	1	4	10	23		0–1	0–1	0–1	1–0	0–1	

Source: Official Report, vol. 3, p. 642

==== Round 2 Pool B ====
Pos	Fencer	W	L	TF	TA	Qual.	HPS	HN	FR	MS	LEL	SF
1	Hans-Peter Schulze (GDR)	5	0	25	13	Q		1–0	1–0	1–0	1–0	1–0
2	Henryk Nielaba (POL)	3	2	22	16	Q	0–1		1–0	1–0	0–1	1–0
3	Franz Rompza (FRG)	2	3	18	17	Q	0–1	0–1		0–1	1–0	1–0
4	Michel Steininger (SUI)	2	3	19	20	Q	0–1	0–1	1–0		1–0	0–1
5	Lars-Erik Larsson (SWE)	2	3	16	22		0–1	1–0	0–1	0–1		1–0
6	Silvio Fernández (VEN)	1	4	11	23		0–1	0–1	0–1	1–0	0–1	

Source: Official Report, vol. 3, p. 642

==== Round 2 Pool C ====
Pos	Fencer	W	L	TF	TA	Qual.	BG	PL	KD	NH	JvK	RL
1	Bogdan Gonsior (POL)	5	0	25	10	Q		1–0	1–0	1–0	1–0	1–0
2	Peter Lötscher (SUI)	3	2	19	19	Q	0–1		1–0	1–0	1–0	0–1
3	Klaus Dumke (GDR)	2	3	21	20	Q	0–1	0–1		0–1	1–0	1–0
4	Nick Halsted (GBR)	2	3	18	22	Q	0–1	0–1	1–0		0–1	1–0
5	Jan von Koss (NOR)	2	3	16	23		0–1	0–1	0–1	1–0		1–0
6	Roland Losert (AUT)	1	4	18	23		0–1	1–0	0–1	0–1	0–1	

Source: Official Report, vol. 3, p. 642

==== Round 2 Pool D ====
Pos	Fencer	W	L	TF	TA	Qual.	VM	CF	SH	BA	RT	GO
1	Viktor Modzolevsky (URS)	4	1	23	13	Q		0–1	1–0	1–0	1–0	1–0
2	Csaba Fenyvesi (HUN)	4	1	24	19	Q	1–0		0–1	1–0	1–0	1–0
3	Ștefan Haukler (ROU)	3	2	19	20	Q	0–1	1–0		1–0	0–1	1–0
4	Bohdan Andrzejewski (POL)	2	3	20	19	Q	0–1	0–1	0–1		1–0	1–0
5	Rudolf Trost (AUT)	1	4	19	22		0–1	0–1	1–0	0–1		0–1
6	Gustavo Oliveros (CUB)	1	4	13	25		0–1	0–1	0–1	0–1	1–0	

Source: Official Report, vol. 3, p. 642

==== Round 2 Pool E ====
Pos	Fencer	W	L	TF	TA	Qual.	OL	MC	DJ	AB	GP	CO
1	Orvar Lindwall (SWE)	4	1	24	19	Q		1–0	1–0	0–1	1–0	1–0
2	Michel Constandt (BEL)	3	2	23	18	Q	0–1		0–1	1–0	1–0	1–0
3	Dieter Jung (FRG)	3	2	21	19	Q	0–1	1–0		1–0	0–1	1–0
4	Alexandre Bretholz (SUI)	3	2	22	21	Q	1–0	0–1	0–1		1–0	1–0
5	Gianfranco Paolucci (ITA)	2	3	22	18		0–1	0–1	1–0	0–1		1–0
6	Colm O'Brien (IRL)	0	5	8	25		0–1	0–1	0–1	0–1	0–1	

Source: Official Report, vol. 3, p. 642

==== Round 2 Pool F ====
Pos	Fencer	W	L	TF	TA	Qual.	ZN	SN	JLD	RJ	CC	OV
1	Zoltán Nemere (HUN)	4	1	22	13	Q		0–1	1–0	1–0	1–0	1–0
2	Stephen Netburn (USA)	3	2	20	17	Q	1–0		1–0	0–1	0–1	1–0
3	Jacques La Degaillerie (FRA)	3	2	20	18	Q	0–1	0–1		1–0	1–0	1–0
4	Ralph Johnson (GBR)	2	3	19	19	Q	0–1	1–0	0–1		1–0	0–1
5	Carlos Calderón (MEX)	2	3	15	21		0–1	1–0	0–1	0–1		1–0
6	Omar Vergara (ARG)	1	4	16	24		0–1	0–1	0–1	1–0	0–1	

Source: Official Report, vol. 3, p. 642

==== Round 2 Pool G ====
Pos	Fencer	W	L	TF	TA	Qual.	GK	EF	FB	FZ	CF	DM
1	Győző Kulcsár (HUN)	5	0	25	12	Q		1–0	1–0	1–0	1–0	1–0
2	Ernesto Fernández (MEX)	3	2	20	18	Q	0–1		1–0	0–1	1–0	1–0
3	Florent Bessemans (BEL)	2	3	18	20	Q	0–1	0–1		1–0	0–1	1–0
4	Fritz Zimmermann (FRG)	2	3	18	22	Q	0–1	1–0	0–1		1–0	0–1
5	Claudio Francesconi (ITA)	2	3	21	23		0–1	0–1	1–0	0–1		1–0
6	David Micahnik (USA)	1	4	15	22		0–1	0–1	0–1	1–0	0–1	

Source: Official Report, vol. 3, p. 642

==== Round 2 Pool H ====
Pos	Fencer	W	L	TF	TA	Qual.	GK	CC	HP	BH	PP	MC
1	Grigory Kriss (URS)	4	1	25	14	Q		0–1	1–0	1–0	1–0	1–0
2	Carlos Couto (BRA)	4	1	22	19	Q	1–0		0–1	1–0	1–0	1–0
3	Herbert Polzhuber (AUT)	3	2	21	18	Q	0–1	1–0		1–0	0–1	1–0
4	Bill Hoskyns (GBR)	2	3	21	19	Q	0–1	0–1	0–1		1–0	1–0
5	Paul Pesthy (USA)	2	3	19	19		0–1	0–1	1–0	0–1		1–0
6	Magdy Conyd (CAN)	0	5	6	25		0–1	0–1	0–1	0–1	0–1	

Source: Official Report, vol. 3, p. 642

=== Double elimination rounds ===
==== Winners brackets ====
===== Winners group 1 =====
Round of 32
Győző Kulcsár (HUN)	W
Florent Bessemans (BEL)	L
Peter Lötscher (SUI)	L
Ralph Johnson (GBR)	W
Michel Constandt (BEL)	L
Stephen Netburn (USA)	W
Jacques La Degaillerie (FRA)	W
Dieter Jung (FRG)	L

Round of 16
Győző Kulcsár (HUN)	W
Ralph Johnson (GBR)	L
Stephen Netburn (USA)	L
Jacques La Degaillerie (FRA)	W

Round of 8
Győző Kulcsár (HUN)	W
Jacques La Degaillerie (FRA)	L

===== Winners group 2 =====
Round of 32
Bogdan Gonsior (POL)	W
Nick Halsted (GBR)	L
Ștefan Haukler (ROU)	L
Grigory Kriss (URS)	W
Jean-Pierre Allemand (FRA)	W
Fritz Zimmermann (FRG)	L
Michel Steininger (SUI)	L
Hans-Peter Schulze (GDR)	W

Round of 16
Bogdan Gonsior (POL)	L
Grigory Kriss (URS)	W
Jean-Pierre Allemand (FRA)	W
Hans-Peter Schulze (GDR)	L

Round of 8
Grigory Kriss (URS)	W
Jean-Pierre Allemand (FRA)	L

===== Winners group 3 =====
Round of 32
Aleksey Nikanchikov (URS)	W
Klaus Dumke (GDR)	L
Bill Hoskyns (GBR)	L
Gianluigi Saccaro (ITA)	W
Orvar Lindwall (SWE)	L
Henryk Nielaba (POL)	W
Alexandre Bretholz (SUI)	L
Zoltán Nemere (HUN)	W

Round of 16
Aleksey Nikanchikov (URS)	L
Gianluigi Saccaro (ITA)	W
Henryk Nielaba (POL)	W
Zoltán Nemere (HUN)	L

Round of 8
Gianluigi Saccaro (ITA)	W
Henryk Nielaba (POL)	L

===== Winners group 4 =====
Round of 32
Viktor Modzolevsky (URS)	W
Ernesto Fernández (MEX)	L
Bohdan Andrzejewski (POL)	L
Franz Rompza (FRG)	W
Herbert Polzhuber (AUT)	W
Carlos Couto (BRA)	L
Peter Bakonyi (CAN)	L
Csaba Fenyvesi (HUN)	W

Round of 16
Viktor Modzolevsky (URS)	W
Franz Rompza (FRG)	L
Herbert Polzhuber (AUT)	W
Csaba Fenyvesi (HUN)	L

Round of 8
Viktor Modzolevsky (URS)	W
Herbert Polzhuber (AUT)	L

==== Losers brackets ====
===== Losers group 1 =====
Round of 8
Florent Bessemans (BEL)	L
Peter Lötscher (SUI)	W
Michel Constandt (BEL)	W
Dieter Jung (FRG)	L
Nick Halsted (GBR)	W
Ștefan Haukler (ROU)	L
Fritz Zimmermann (FRG)	W
Michel Steininger (SUI)	L

Round of 8
Peter Lötscher (SUI)	W
Ralph Johnson (GBR)	L
Michel Constandt (BEL)	L
Stephen Netburn (USA)	W
Nick Halsted (GBR)	L
Bogdan Gonsior (POL)	W
Fritz Zimmermann (FRG)	W
Hans-Peter Schulze (GDR)	L

Round of 4
Peter Lötscher (SUI)	W
Stephen Netburn (USA)	L
Bogdan Gonsior (POL)	W
Fritz Zimmermann (FRG)	L

Round of 4
Peter Lötscher (SUI)	W
Jacques La Degaillerie (FRA)	L
Bogdan Gonsior (POL)	L
Jean-Pierre Allemand (FRA)	W

Round of 2
Peter Lötscher (SUI)	L
Jean-Pierre Allemand (FRA)	W

===== Losers group 2 =====
Round of 8
Klaus Dumke (GDR)	W
Bill Hoskyns (GBR)	L
Orvar Lindwall (SWE)	W
Alexandre Bretholz (SUI)	L
Ernesto Fernández (MEX)	L
Bohdan Andrzejewski (POL)	W
Carlos Couto (BRA)	L
Peter Bakonyi (CAN)	W

Round of 8
Klaus Dumke (GDR)	L
Aleksey Nikanchikov (URS)	W
Orvar Lindwall (SWE)	L
Zoltán Nemere (HUN)	W
Bohdan Andrzejewski (POL)	L
Franz Rompza (FRG)	W
Peter Bakonyi (CAN)	L
Csaba Fenyvesi (HUN)	W

Round of 4
Aleksey Nikanchikov (URS)	W
Zoltán Nemere (HUN)	L
Franz Rompza (FRG)	L
Csaba Fenyvesi (HUN)	W

Round of 4
Aleksey Nikanchikov (URS)	L
Henryk Nielaba (POL)	W
Csaba Fenyvesi (HUN)	L
Herbert Polzhuber (AUT)	W

Round of 2
Henryk Nielaba (POL)	L
Herbert Polzhuber (AUT)	W

=== Final round ===
Pos	Fencer	W	L	TF	TA	Qual.	GKu	GKr	GS	VM	AZE	JPA
1	Győző Kulcsár (HUN)	4	1	24	14	B		0–1	1–0	1–0	1–0	1–0
1	Grigory Kriss (URS)	4	1	25	19	B	1–0		0–1	1–0	1–0	1–0
1	Gianluigi Saccaro (ITA)	4	1	21	19	B	0–1	1–0		1–0	1–0	1–0
4	Viktor Modzolevsky (URS)	2	3	20	23		0–1	0–1	0–1		1–0	1–0
5	Herbert Polzhuber (AUT)	1	4	17	24		0–1	0–1	0–1	0–1		1–0
6	Jean-Pierre Allemand (FRA)	0	5	17	25		0–1	0–1	0–1	0–1	0–1	

Source: Official Report, vol. 3, p. 643

Barrage

Pos	Fencer	W	L	TF	TA	GKu	GKr	GS
1st place, gold medalist(s)	Győző Kulcsár (HUN)	2	0	10	5		1–0	1–0
2nd place, silver medalist(s)	Grigory Kriss (URS)	0	2	8	10	0–1		0–1
3rd place, bronze medalist(s)	Gianluigi Saccaro (ITA)	0	2	7	10	0–1	0–1	

Source: Official Report, vol. 3, p. 643
