= Fencing at the 1968 Summer Olympics – Men's team épée =

Men's team épée at the Games of the XIX Olympiad
- Venue: Fernando Montes de Oca Fencing Hall
- Dates: 24 – 25 October
- Competitors: 91 from 20 nations

Medalists
1st place, gold medalist(s)		Zoltán Nemere; Győző Kulcsár; Pál B. Nagy; Csaba Fenyvesi; Pál Schmitt	Hungary
2nd place, silver medalist(s)		Grigory Kriss; Viktor Modzolevsky; Iosif Vitebsky; Aleksey Nikanchikov; Yury Smolyakov	Soviet Union
3rd place, bronze medalist(s)		Bohdan Andrzejewski; Michał Butkiewicz; Bogdan Gonsior; Henryk Nielaba; Kazimierz Barburski	Poland

The men's team épée was one of eight fencing events on the fencing at the 1968 Summer Olympics programme. It was the thirteenth appearance of the event. The competition was held from 24 to 25 October 1968. 91 fencers from 20 nations competed. For the first time in 60 years, Italy failed to finish in the top three positions.

== Rosters ==
Argentina

- Guillermo Saucedo
- Alberto Balestrini
- Guillermo Obeid
- Omar Vergara

Australia

- Russell Hobby
- Peter Macken
- Graeme Jennings
- Bill Ronald
- Duncan Page

Austria

- Udo Birnbaum
- Roland Losert
- Herbert Polzhuber
- Frank Battig

Brazil

- Arthur Ribeiro
- Darío Amaral
- José Maria Pereira
- Carlos Couto

Canada

- Peter Bakonyi
- John Andru
- Magdy Conyd
- Gerry Wiedel

Cuba

- Orlando Ruíz
- Gustavo Oliveros
- Manuel González
- José Antonio Díaz

East Germany

- Bernd Uhlig
- Klaus Dumke
- Harry Fiedler
- Hans-Peter Schulze

France

- François Jeanne
- Claude Bourquard
- Yves Boissier
- Jacques La Degaillerie
- Jean-Pierre Allemand

Great Britain

- Nick Halsted
- Teddy Bourne
- Bill Hoskyns
- Ralph Johnson
- Peter Jacobs

Hungary

- Zoltán Nemere
- Győző Kulcsár
- Pál B. Nagy
- Csaba Fenyvesi
- Pál Schmitt

Ireland

- John Bouchier-Hayes
- Fionbarr Farrell
- Michael Ryan
- Colm O'Brien

Italy

- Gianfranco Paolucci
- Claudio Francesconi
- Giovanni Battista Breda
- Gianluigi Saccaro
- Antonio Albanese

Mexico

- Carlos Calderón
- Valeriano Pérez
- Jorge Castillejos
- Ernesto Fernández

Poland

- Bohdan Andrzejewski
- Michał Butkiewicz
- Bogdan Gonsior
- Henryk Nielaba
- Kazimierz Barburski

Portugal

- Hélder Reis
- José Pinheiro
- João de Abreu
- Francisco da Silva

Soviet Union

- Grigory Kriss
- Viktor Modzolevsky
- Iosif Vitebsky
- Aleksey Nikanchikov
- Yury Smolyakov

Sweden

- Dicki Sörensen
- Orvar Lindwall
- Carl von Essen
- Lars-Erik Larsson
- Rolf Edling

Switzerland

- Denys Chamay
- Peter Lötscher
- Christian Kauter
- Alexandre Bretholz
- Michel Steininger

United States

- Paul Pesthy
- Stephen Netburn
- David Micahnik
- Daniel Cantillon
- Robert Beck

West Germany

- Dieter Jung
- Franz Rompza
- Fritz Zimmermann
- Max Geuter
- Paul Gnaier

== Results ==
=== Round 1 ===
==== Pool A ====
Pos	Team	W	L	BW	BL	Qual.	URS	ITA	USA	POR
1	Soviet Union	3	0	33	11	Q		10–4	10–5	13–2
2	Italy	2	1	29	17	Q	4–10		10–6	15–1
3	United States	0	2	11	20		5–10	6–10		
4	Portugal	0	2	3	28		2–13	1–15		

Source: Official Report, vol. 3, pp. 650–52

==== Pool B ====
Pos	Team	W	L	BW	BL	Qual.	HUN	AUT	MEX	AUS
1	Hungary	3	0	33	9	Q		8–3	11–4	14–2
2	Austria	2	1	25	18	Q	3–8		10–6	12–4
3	Mexico	1	2	18	28		4–11	6–10		8–7
4	Australia	0	3	13	34		2–14	4–12	7–8	

Source: Official Report, vol. 3, pp. 650–52

==== Pool C ====
Pos	Team	W	L	BW	BL	Qual.	POL	GDR	CAN	ARG
1	Poland	3	0	35	13	Q		9–7	10–6	16–0
2	East Germany	2	1	34	14	Q	7–9		14–2	13–3
3	Canada	0	2	8	24		6–10	2–14		
4	Argentina	0	2	3	29		0–16	3–13		

Source: Official Report, vol. 3, pp. 650–52

==== Pool D ====
Pos	Team	W	L	BW	BL	Qual.	FRG	SWE	SUI	IRL
1	West Germany	3	0	35	8	Q		9–2	11–5	15–1
2	Sweden	2	1	26	16	Q	2–9		11–4	13–3
3	Switzerland	0	2	9	22		5–11	4–11		
4	Ireland	0	2	4	28		1–15	3–13		

Source: Official Report, vol. 3, pp. 650–52

==== Pool E ====
Pos	Team	W	L	BW	BL	Qual.	GBR	FRA	BRA	CUB
1	Great Britain	3	0	33	12	Q		9–4	10–6	14–2
2	France	2	1	30	14	Q	4–9		13–3	13–2
3	Brazil	0	2	9	23		6–10	3–13		
4	Cuba	0	2	4	27		2–14	2–13		

Source: Official Report, vol. 3, pp. 650–52

=== Elimination rounds ===
Main bracket

Round of 16
A2	Italy	8
B2	Austria	2
C2	East Germany	8 (58)
D2	Sweden	8 (59)

Quarterfinals
A2	Italy	0
A1	Soviet Union	7
D1	West Germany	9
E1	Great Britain	5
C2	East Germany	3
B1	Hungary	9
C1	Poland	9
E2	France	7

Semifinals
A1	Soviet Union	9
D1	West Germany	3
B1	Hungary	9
C1	Poland	5

Final
A1	Soviet Union	4
B1	Hungary	7
Bronze
D1	West Germany	6
C1	Poland	9

Consolation

Consol. semifinals
A2	Italy	9
E1	Great Britain	4
C2	East Germany	8
E2	France	4

5th/6th
A2	Italy	6
C2	East Germany	9

== Final ranking ==
Rank	Nation
1st place, gold medalist(s)	Hungary
2nd place, silver medalist(s)	Soviet Union
3rd place, bronze medalist(s)	Poland
4	West Germany
5	East Germany
6	Italy
7	France
7	Great Britain
9	Austria
9	Sweden
11	Brazil
11	Canada
11	Mexico
11	Switzerland
11	United States
16	Argentina
16	Australia
16	Cuba
16	Ireland
16	Portugal
