= Fencing at the 1968 Summer Olympics =

Fencing at the Games of the XIX Olympiad

At the 1968 Summer Olympics in Mexico City, eight events in fencing were contested. Men competed in both individual and team events for each of the three weapon types (épée, foil and sabre), but women competed only in foil events.

== Medal summary ==
=== Men's events ===
Games	Gold	Silver	Bronze
Individual épée	Győző Kulcsár; Hungary	Grigory Kriss; Soviet Union	Gianluigi Saccaro; Italy
team épée	Hungary; Csaba Fenyvesi; Zoltan Nemere; Pál Schmitt; Gyözö Kulcsar; Pal Nagy	Soviet Union; Grigory Kriss; Iosif Vitebsky; Aleksei Nikanchikov; Yuri Smolyakov; Viktor Modzalevsky	Poland; Bogdan Andrzejewski; Michał Butkiewicz; Bogdan Gonsior; Henryk Nielaba; Kazimierz Barburski
individual foil	Ion Drîmbă; Romania	Jenő Kamuti; Hungary	Daniel Revenu; France
team foil	France; Daniel Revenu; Gilles Berolatti; Christian Noël; Jean-Claude Magnan; Jacques Dimont	Soviet Union; German Sveshnikov; Yuri Sharov; Vasili Stankovich; Viktor Putyatin; Yuri Sisikin	Poland; Witold Woyda; Zbigniew Skrudlik; Ryszard Parulski; Egon Franke; Adam Lisewski
individual sabre	Jerzy Pawłowski; Poland	Mark Rakita; Soviet Union	Tibor Pézsa; Hungary
team sabre	Soviet Union; Vladimir Nazlymov; Viktor Sidyak; Eduard Vinokurov; Mark Rakita; Umar Mavlikhanov	Italy; Wladimiro Calarese; Michele Maffei; Cesare Salvadori; Pierluigi Chicca; Rolando Rigoli	Hungary; Tamás Kovács; János Kalmár; Péter Bakonyi; Miklós Meszéna; Tibor Pézsa

=== Women's events ===
Games	Gold	Silver	Bronze
individual foil	Elena Belova; Soviet Union	Pilar Roldán; Mexico	Ildikó Újlaky-Rejtő; Hungary
team foil	Soviet Union; Aleksandra Zabelina; Tatyana Samusenko; Elena Belova; Galina Gorokhova; Svetlana Tširkova	Hungary; Lidia Dömölki-Sakovics; Ildikó Bóbis; Ildikó Újlaky-Rejtő; Maria Jarmy; Paula Marosi-Foldesi	Romania; Ecaterina Iencic-Stahl; Ileana Gyulai-Drimba-Jenei; Maria Vicol; Olga Orban-Szabo; Ana Dersidan-Ene-Pascu

== Medal table ==
Rank	Nation	Gold	Silver	Bronze	Total
1	Soviet Union	3	4	0	7
2	Hungary	2	2	3	7
3	Poland	1	0	2	3
4	France	1	0	1	2
4	Romania	1	0	1	2
6	Italy	0	1	1	2
7	Mexico	0	1	0	1
Totals (7 entries)		8	8	8	24

== Participating nations ==
A total of 275 fencers (217 men and 58 women) from 34 nations competed at the Mexico City Games:

- Argentina (10)
- Australia (5)
- Austria (5)
- Belgium (3)
- Brazil (4)
- Canada (5)
- Cuba (13)
- East Germany (4)
- Egypt (4)
- France (20)
- Great Britain (17)
- Hungary (20)
- Ireland (4)
- Italy (19)
- Japan (5)
- Lebanon (3)
- Luxembourg (1)
- Mexico (14)
- Netherlands Antilles (3)
- Norway (2)
- Paraguay (1)
- Peru (1)
- Poland (20)
- Portugal (4)
- Puerto Rico (1)
- Romania (10)
- Soviet Union (20)
- Sweden (6)
- Switzerland (5)
- United States (20)
- Uruguay (1)
- Venezuela (4)
- Vietnam (1)
- West Germany (20)

== Sources ==
- "Olympic Medal Winners". International Olympic Committee.
