= Poland at the 1968 Summer Olympics =

- IOC code: POL
- NOC: Polish Olympic Committee

in Mexico City, Mexico October 12, 1968 – October 27, 1968
- Competitors: 177 in 16 sports
- Flag bearer: Waldemar Baszanowski
- Medals Ranked 11th: Gold 5 Silver 2 Bronze 11 Total 18

Summer Olympics appearances (overview)
- 1924; 1928; 1932; 1936; 1948; 1952; 1956; 1960; 1964; 1968; 1972; 1976; 1980; 1984; 1988; 1992; 1996; 2000; 2004; 2008; 2012; 2016; 2020; 2024

Other related appearances
- Russian Empire (1900, 1912); Austria (1908–1912)

Poland competed at the 1968 Summer Olympics in Mexico City, Mexico. 177 competitors, 140 men and 37 women, took part in 112 events in 16 sports.

== Medalists ==
=== Gold ===
- Irena Szewińska — Athletics, Women's 200 metres
- Jerzy Kulej — Boxing, Men's Light Welterweight
- Jerzy Pawłowski — Fencing, Men's Sabre Individual
- Józef Zapędzki — Shooting, Men's Rapid-Fire Pistol
- Waldemar Baszanowski — Weightlifting, Men's Lightweight

=== Silver ===
- Artur Olech — Boxing, Men's Flyweight
- Józef Grudzień — Boxing, Men's Lightweight

=== Bronze ===
- Irena Szewińska — Athletics, Women's 100 metres
- Hubert Skrzypczak — Boxing, Men's Light Flyweight
- Stanisław Dragan — Boxing, Men's Light Heavyweight
- Janusz Kierzkowski — Cycling, Men's 1000m Time Trial
- Zbigniew Skrudlik, Witold Woyda, Egon Franke, Adam Lisewski, and Ryszard Parulski — Fencing, Men's Foil Team Competition
- Henryk Nielaba, Bohdan Gonsior, Michał Butkiewicz, Bohdan Andrzejewski, and Kazimierz Barburski — Fencing, Men's Épée Team Competition
- Elżbieta Porzec, Zofia Szczęśniewska, Wanda Wiecha, Barbara Hermela-Niemczyk, Krystyna Ostromęcka, Krystyna Krupa, Jadwiga Książęk, Józefa Ledwig, Krystyna Jakubowska, Lidia Chmielnicka, Krystyna Czajkowska, and Halina Aszkiełowicz — Volleyball, Women's Team Competition
- Henryk Trębicki — Weightlifting, Men's Bantamweight
- Marian Zieliński — Weightlifting, Men's Lightweight
- Norbert Ozimek — Weightlifting, Men's Light Heavyweight
- Marek Gołąb — Weightlifting, Men's Middle Heavyweight

== Athletics ==
Men
Track & road events

Athlete	Event	Heat		Quarterfinal		Semifinal		Final	
Athlete	Event	Result	Rank	Result	Rank	Result	Rank	Result	Rank
Andrzej Badeński	400 m	45.52	1 Q	45.60	2 Q	45.50	3 Q	45.42	7
Jan Balachowski	400 m	46.23	2 Q	46.33	5	Did not advance			
Roland Brehmer	5000 m	15:13.8	10	Did not advance					
Roland Brehmer	10000 m	DNS		Did not advance					
Jan Cych	3000 m steeplechase	9:50.78	11	—N/a				Did not advance	
Marian Dudziak	100 m	10.46	3 Q	10.32	5	Did not advance			
Jerzy Maluśki	1500 m	3:54.83	9	Did not advance					
Wiesław Maniak	100 m	10.49	4	Did not advance					
Zenon Nowosz	100 m	10.57	5	Did not advance					
Edward Romanowski	200 m	20:95	3 Q	20:85	3 Q	20:80	6	Did not advance	
Mieczysław Rutyna	20 km walk	—N/a						1:47:29	26
Mieczysław Rutyna	50 km walk	—N/a						4:58:03.8	22
Henryk Szordykowski	800 m	1:47.48	2 Q	—N/a		DNS		Did not advance	
Henryk Szordykowski	1500 m	3:59.34	3 Q	—N/a		3:54.24	4 Q	3:46.69	7
Wilhelm Weistand	400 m hurdles	50.7	5	Did not advance					
Jan Werner	400 m	45.97	1 Q	45.63	1 Q	45.75	5	Did not advance	
Wiesław Maniak; Edward Romanowski; Zenon Nowosz; Marian Dudziak	4×100 m relay	40.27	3 Q	—N/a		38.99	4 Q	39.22	8
Stanisław Grędziński; Jan Balachowski; Jan Werner; Andrzej Badeński	4×400 m relay	3:03.02	1 Q	—N/a				3:00.58	4

Field events

Athlete	Event	Qualification		Final	
Athlete	Event	Distance	Position	Distance	Position
Lech Gajdziński	Discus throw	54.92	18	Did not advance	
Jan Jaskólski	Triple jump	16.04	14	Did not advance	
Władysław Komar	Shot Put	19.09	9 Q	19.28	6
Władysław Nikiciuk	Javelin throw	81.00	8 Q	85.70	4
Edmund Piątkowski	Discus throw	58.24	12 Q	59.40	7
Janusz Sidło	Javelin throw	80.12	10 Q	80.58	7
Andrzej Stalmach	Long jump	7.70	15 Q	7.94	8
Józef Szmidt	Triple jump	16.19	11 Q	16.89	7

Women
Track & road events

Athlete	Event	Heat		Quarterfinal		Semifinal		Final	
Athlete	Event	Result	Rank	Result	Rank	Result	Rank	Result	Rank
Danuta Straszyńska	80 m hurdles	10.7	3 Q	—N/a		10.5	3 Q	10.6	6
Teresa Sukniewicz	80 m hurdles	10.7	2 Q	—N/a		10.9	6	Did not advance	
Irena Szewińska	100 m	11.3	1 Q	11.1	1 Q	11.3	1 Q	11.1	Bronze medal
Irena Szewińska	200 m	23.2	1 Q	—N/a		23.2	3 Q	22.5 WR	Gold medal
Elżbieta Żebrowska	80 m hurdles	10.8	2Q	—N/a		10.6	4 Q	10.6	7
Danuta Straszyńska; Mirosława Sarna; Urszula Jóźwik; Irena Szewińska	4×100 m relay	53.00	7	Did not advance					

Field events

Athlete	Event	Qualification		Final	
Athlete	Event	Distance	Position	Distance	Position
Daniela Jaworska	Javelin throw	—N/a		56.06	5
Lucyna Krawcewicz	Javelin throw	—N/a		51.54	12
Mirosława Sarna	Long jump	6.44	5 Q	6.47	5
Irena Szewińska	Long jump	6.19	16	Did not advance	

== Basketball ==
=== Group B ===
Qualified for the semifinals

Team	W	L	PF	PA	PD	Pts
Soviet Union	7	0	642	408	+234	14
Brazil	6	1	561	418	+143	13
Mexico	5	2	493	443	+50	12
Poland	4	3	473	504	−31	11
Bulgaria	3	4	456	478	−22	10
Cuba	2	5	514	532	−18	9
South Korea	1	6	453	530	−77	8
Morocco	0	7	355	634	−279	7

13 October

Soviet Union	91–50	Poland

Palacio de los Deportes, Mexico City

14 October

Poland	77–67	South Korea

Palacio de los Deportes, Mexico City

15 October

Poland	78–75	Cuba

Palacio de los Deportes, Mexico City

16 October

Poland	51–88	Brazil

Palacio de los Deportes, Mexico City

18 October

Morocco	48–85	Poland

Palacio de los Deportes, Mexico City

19 October

Bulgaria	67–69	Poland

Palacio de los Deportes, Mexico City

20 October

Mexico	68–63	Poland

Palacio de los Deportes, Mexico City

19 October

Bulgaria	67–69	Poland

Palacio de los Deportes, Mexico City

20 October

Mexico	68–63	Poland

Palacio de los Deportes, Mexico City

=== Classification brackets ===
==== 5th–8th Place ====
22 October

Italy	52–66	Poland

Palacio de los Deportes, Mexico City

==== 5th-6th Place ====
25 October

Mexico	75–65	Poland

Palacio de los Deportes, Mexico City

== Boxing ==
Men

Athlete	Event	1 Round	2 Round	3 Round	Quarterfinals	Semifinals	Final	
Athlete	Event	Opposition Result	Opposition Result	Opposition Result	Opposition Result	Opposition Result	Rank	
Hubert Skrzypczak	Light Flyweight	—N/a	Mohamed Sohem (EGY); W 5-0	Tahar Aziz (MAR); W 4-1	Joseph Donovan (AUS); W 3-2	Jee Yong-Ju (KOR); W 1-4	Did not advance	Bronze medal
Artur Olech	Flyweight	—N/a	BYE	Constantin Ciuca (ROU); W 3-2	Nikolay Novikov (URS); W TKO	Leo Rwabwogo (UGA); W 3-2	Ricardo Delgado (MEX); L 0-5	Silver medal
Jan Gałązka	Bantamweight	BYE	Domingo Casco Catalina (ARG); L 2-3	Did not advance				
Jan Wadas	Featherweight	—N/a	Ivan Mihailov (BUL); L 1-4	Did not advance				
Józef Grudzień	Lightweight	Su-Lung Ho (TPE); W 5-0	Roberto Caminero Perez (CUB); W 5-0	Anthony Quinn (IRL); W 4-1	Enzo Petriglia (ITA); W 5-0	Zvonimir Vujin (YUG); W 5-0	Ronnie Harris (USA); L 0-5	Silver medal
Jerzy Kulej	Light-Welterweight	BYE	János Kajdi (HUN); W 3-2	Gianbattista Capretti (ITA); W 4-1	Peter Tiepold (GDR); W 3-2	Arto Nilsson (FIN); W 5-0	Enrique Regüeiferos (CUB); W 3-2	Gold medal
Marian Kasprzyk	Welterweight	BYE	Armando Muniz (USA); L 1-4	Did not advance				
Witold Stachurski	Light Middleweight	—N/a	Janos Covaci (ROU); L 2-3	Did not advance				
Wiesław Rudkowski	Middleweight	—N/a	BYE	Charles Amos (GUY); W RSC	Aleksei Kiselyov (URS); L 0-5	Did not advance		5
Stanislaw Dragan	Light Heavyweight	—N/a	BYE	Jorge Clemente (PUR); W WO	Walter Facchinetti (ITA); W 4-1	Ion Monea (ROU); L 1-4	Did not advance	Bronze medal
Lucjan Trela	Heavyweight	—N/a		George Foreman (USA); L 1-4	Did not advance			

== Canoeing ==
=== Sprint ===
Men

Athlete	Event	Heats		Repechages		Semifinals		Final	
Athlete	Event	Time	Rank	Time	Rank	Time	Rank	Time	Rank
Władysław Szuszkiewicz	K-1 1000 m	4:03.4	1 Q	BYE		4:05.72	1 Q	4:06.36	4
Ewald Janusz; Rafal Piszcz; Władysław Zieliński; Ryszard Marchlik	K-4 1000 m	3:21.7	3 Q	BYE		3:21.29	3 Q	3:22.10	8

Women

Athlete	Event	Heats		Semifinals		Final	
Athlete	Event	Time	Rank	Time	Rank	Time	Rank
Stanisława Szydłowska	K-1 500 m	2:12.1	5 q	2:15.32	4	Did not advance	
Izabella Antonowicz; Jadwiga Doering	K-2 500 m	2:06.8	5 q	2:03.48	1 Q	2:04.20	9

== Cycling ==
Ten cyclists represented Poland in 1968.

=== Road ===
Athlete	Event	Time	Rank
Marian Kegel	Men's road race	4:44:00	10
Kazimierz Jasiński	Men's road race	5:08:25	59
Zygmunt Hanusik	Men's road race	5:20:59	62
Zenon Czechowski	Men's road race	DNF	
Andrzej Bławdzin; Zenon Czechowski; Jan Magiera; Marian Kegel	Team time trial	2:14:40.98	6

=== Track ===
1000m time trial

Athlete	Event	Time	Rank
Janusz Kierzkowski	Men's 1000m time trial	1:04.63	Bronze medal

Pursuit

Athlete	Event	Qualification		Round of 16	Quarterfinals	Semifinals	Final	
Athlete	Event	Time	Rank	Opposition Time	Opposition Time	Opposition Time	Opposition Time	Rank
Rajmund Zieliński	Men's individual pursuit	4:46.03	10	—N/a	Did not advance			10
Wojciech Matusiak; Janusz Kierzkowski; Wacław Latocha; Rajmund Zieliński	Team pursuit	—N/a		Czechoslovakia (TCH); L 4:23.77 Q	West Germany (FRG); L 4:38.91	Did not advance		5

== Diving ==
Men

Athlete	Event	Preliminaries		Final			
Athlete	Event	Points	Rank	Points	Rank	Total	Rank
Jerzy Kowalewski	3 m springboard	79.97	21	Did not advance			
Jerzy Kowalewski	10 m platform	85.08	22	Did not advance			
Wlodzimierz Mejsak	10 m platform	89.41	13	Did not advance			
Jakub Puchow	3 m springboard	88.65	15	Did not advance			
Jakub Puchow	10 m platform	85.14	21	Did not advance			

Women

Athlete	Event	Preliminaries		Final			
Athlete	Event	Points	Rank	Points	Rank	Total	Rank
Bogusława Pietkiewicz	3 m springboard	76.45	20	Did not advance			
Bogusława Pietkiewicz	10 m platform	49.53	4 Q	45.56	8	95.09	5
Elżbieta Wierniuk	3 m springboard	87.62	9 Q	34.80	12	122.42	11
Elżbieta Wierniuk	10 m platform	47.26	15	Did not advance			

== Equestrian ==
=== Show jumping ===
Athlete	Horse	Event	Qualification		Final	
Athlete	Horse	Event	Penalties	Rank	Penalties	Rank
Marian Kozicki	Braz	Individual	28.00	35	Did not advance	
Antoni Pacyński	Cyrrus	Individual	37.25	38	Did not advance	
Piotr Wawryniuk	Farys	Individual	52.75	39	Did not advance	
Marian Kozicki; Antoni Pacyński; Piotr Wawryniuk	See above	Team	123.50	12	223,25	11

== Fencing ==
20 fencers, 15 men and 5 women, represented Poland in 1968.

=== Men ===
Athlete	Event	Round 1		Round 2		Quarterfinal		Semifinal		Final	
Athlete	Event	Opposition Result	Rank	Opposition Result	Rank	Opposition Result	Rank	Opposition Result	Rank	Opposition Result	Rank
Bohdan Andrzejewski	Men's épée		3 Q		4 Q		4	Did not advance			13
Bogdan Gonsior	Men's épée		3 Q		3 Q		5	Did not advance			17
Henryk Nielaba	Men's épée		2 Q		1 Q		4	Did not advance			
Henryk Nielaba; Michał Butkiewicz; Bogdan Gonsior; Bohdan Andrzejewski; Kazimierz Barburski	Team épée	Argentina; W 16-0; Canada; W 10-6; East Germany; W 9-7	1 Q	—N/a		France; W 9-7		Hungary; L 5-9		West Germany; W 9-6	Bronze medal
Adam Lisewski	Men's foil		2 Q		2 Q		1 Q		6	Did not advance	11
Ryszard Parulski	Men's foil		1 Q		4 Q		2 Q		5	Did not advance	9
Witold Woyda	Men's foil		1 Q		1 Q		3 Q		2 Q		
Witold Woyda; Zbigniew Skrudlik; Ryszard Parulski; Egon Franke; Adam Lisewski	Team foil	Venezuela; W 10-6; Argentina; W 11-5; Hungary; W 9-4	1 Q	—N/a		Germany; W 9-4		France; L 7-9		Romania; W 9-3	Bronze medal
Józef Nowara	Men's sabre		1 Q		2 Q		2 Q		1 Q		6
Emil Ochyra	Men's sabre		1 Q		1 Q		1 Q		4 Q		5
Jerzy Pawłowski	Men's sabre		2 Q		1 Q	Rylsky (URS) W 5-4; Ferrari (ITA) L 2-5; Horváth (HUN) L 1-5; Van Der Auwera (BEL) L 4-5; Morales (USA) W 5-3	4	Did not advance			
Emil Ochyra; Jerzy Pawłowski; Józef Nowara; Franciszek Sobczak; Zygmunt Kawecki	Team sabre	Cuba; W 13-3; France; L 7-9	2 Q	—N/a		France; L 2-9		Great Britain; W 9-2		United States; W 9-5	5

=== Women ===
Athlete	Event	Round 1		Round 2		Round 3		Round 4		Quarterfinal	Semifinal	Final	
Athlete	Event	Opposition Result	Rank	Opposition Result	Rank	Opposition Result	Rank	Opposition Result	Rank	Opposition Result	Opposition Result	Opposition Result	Rank
Halina Balon	Women's foil			Did not advance									
Elżbieta Franke-Cymerman	Women's foil			Did not advance									
Kamilla Składanowska	Women's foil			Did not advance									
Halina Balon; Kamilla Składanowska; Elżbieta Franke-Cymerman; Elżbieta Pawlas; Wanda Fukała-Kaczmarczyk	Team foil	Soviet Union; L 4-12; Romania; L 10-6	3	—N/a						Did not advance			7

== Gymnastics ==
=== Artistic ===
Men

Athlete	Event	Final Standings								Apparatus Final							
Athlete	Event	Apparatus						Total	Rank	Apparatus						Total	Rank
Athlete	Event	F	PH	R	V	PB	HB	Total	Rank	F	PH	R	V	PB	HB	Total	Rank
Andrzej Gonera	All-around	17.80	17.95	18.30	18.25	18.55	18.40	109.25	38	Did not advance							
Jerzy Kruża	All-around	17.85	18.10	17.70	18.15	18.10	18.25	108.15	53	Did not advance							
Mikołaj Kubica	All-around	18.50	19.00	18.75	18.70	19.05	18.80	112.80	13	Did not advance							
Sylwester Kubica	All-around	18.45	18.40	17.80	18.05	18.70	18.40	109.80	31	Did not advance							
Wilhelm Kubica	All-around	18.55	19.10 Q	18.60	18.55	19.15	19.20	113.15	11	—N/a	19.15	Did not advance				19.15	4
Aleksander Rokosa	All-around	18.00	17.55	18.25	18.40	18.40	18.25	108.85	44	Did not advance							
Andrzej Gonera; Jerzy Kruża; Mikołaj Kubica; Sylwester Kubica; Wilhelm Kubica; Aleksander Rokosa	Team all-around	91.45	92.55	91.85	92.20	93.85	93.50	555.40	5	Did not advance							

Women

Athlete	Event	Final Standings						Apparatus Final					
Athlete	Event	Apparatus				Total	Rank	Apparatus				Total	Rank
Athlete	Event	F	V	UB	BB	Total	Rank	F	V	UB	BB	Total	Rank
Małgorzata Chojnacka	All-around	17.60	16.75	17.35	15.65	67.35	82	Did not advance					
Halina Daniec	All-around	17.75	17.70	17.80	15.95	69.20	67	Did not advance					
Wiesława Lech	All-around	17.95	17.55	18.05	18.00	71.55	42	Did not advance					
Łucja Ochmańska	All-around	18.00	18.05	17.90	17.80	71.75	40	Did not advance					
Grażyna Witkowska	All-around	18.00	17.40	18.10	16.80	70.30	55	Did not advance					
Barbara Zięba	All-around	17.65	17.90	17.65	17.55	70.75	46	Did not advance					
Małgorzata Chojnacka; Halina Daniec; Wiesława Lech; Łucja Ochmańska; Grażyna Witkowska; Barbara Zięba	Team all-around	89.40	88.60	89.75	86.10	353.85	10	—N/a					

== Rowing ==
Men

Athlete	Event	Heats		Repechage		Semifinal		Final	
Athlete	Event	Time	Rank	Time	Rank	Time	Rank	Time	Rank
Zdzislaw Bromek	Single sculls	8:06.61	5 R	7:48.68	3 Q	8:13.92	6 FB	7:45.48	7
Jerzy Broniec; Alfons Ślusarski	Coxless pair	7:45.51	3 R	7:35.81	3 Q	7:40.10	6 FB	7:22.89	8

== Sailing ==
Open

Athlete	Event	Race							Net points	Final rank
Athlete	Event	1	2	3	4	5	6	7	Net points	Final rank
Andrzej Zawieja	Finn	6	17	19	10	~~25~~	11	17	115.7	12
Andrzej Iwiński; Ludwik Raczyński	Flying Dutchman	20	18	24	25	25	17	~~26~~	165	24

== Shooting ==
Eleven shooters, ten men and one woman, represented Poland in 1968. Józef Zapędzki won gold in the 25 metre pistol.

Open

Athlete	Event	Final	
Athlete	Event	Score	Rank
Włodzimierz Danek	Skeet	189	23
Ryszard Fandier	300 metre rifle three positions	1127	15
Ryszard Fandier	50 metre rifle three positions	1139	25
Wiesław Gawlikowski	Skeet	188	24
Wacław Hamerliński	25 m rapid fire pistol	585	16
Paweł Małek	50 m pistol	556	5
Jerzy Nowicki	50 metre rifle three positions	1140	24
Jerzy Nowicki	50 metre rifle prone	593	21
Adam Smelczyński	Trap	195	6
Rajmund Stachurski	50 m pistol	544	28
Eugeniusz Pędzisz	300 metre rifle three positions	1117	20
Eulalia Rolińska	50 metre rifle prone	593	22
Józef Zapędzki	25 m rapid fire pistol	593	Gold medal

== Swimming ==
Men

Athlete	Event	Heat		Semifinal		Final	
Athlete	Event	Time	Rank	Time	Rank	Time	Rank
Józef Klukowski	100 metre breaststroke	1:11.0	22 Q	1:10.9	18	Did not advance	
Józef Klukowski	200 metre breaststroke	2:41.6	25	Did not advance			
Jacek Krawczyk	200 metre butterfly	2:22.1	24	Did not advance			
Jacek Krawczyk	200 metre medley	2:23.8	25	Did not advance			
Jacek Krawczyk	400 metre medley	5:15.1	22	Did not advance			
Zbigniew Pacelt	200 metre freestyle	2:06.3	33	Did not advance			
Zbigniew Pacelt	200 metre medley	2:23.3	23	Did not advance			
Zbigniew Pacelt	400 metre medley	5:18.6	25	Did not advance			
Władysław Wojtakajtis	200 metre freestyle	2:06.0	31	Did not advance			
Władysław Wojtakajtis	400 metre freestyle	4:31.1	19	Did not advance			
Władysław Wojtakajtis	1500 metre freestyle	18:32.4	18	Did not advance			

== Volleyball ==
Women's team competition

- Round robin

Date		Score		Set 1	Set 2	Set 3	Set 4	Set 5	Total
13 Oct	Poland	3–2	South Korea	–	–	–			–
14 Oct	Soviet Union	3–0	Poland	–	–	–			–
16 Oct	Poland	3–0	United States	–	–	–			–
19 Oct	Poland	3–2	Mexico	–	–	–			–
20 Oct	Japan	3–0	Poland	–	–	–			–
24 Oct	Poland	3–0	Czechoslovakia	–	–	–			–
25 Oct	Poland	3–1	Peru	–	–	–			–

Roster

Bronze Medal

- Elżbieta Porzec
- Zofia Szczęśniewska
- Wanda Wiecha
- Barbara Hermela-Niemczyk
- Krystyna Ostromęcka
- Krystyna Krupa
- Jadwiga Książek
- Józefa Ledwig
- Krystyna Jakubowska
- Lidia Chmielnicka
- Krystyna Czajkowska
- Halina Aszkiełowicz

Head coach

== Weightlifting ==
Men

Athlete	Event	Military Press		Snatch		Clean & Jerk		Total	Rank
Athlete	Event	Result	Rank	Result	Rank	Result	Rank	Total	Rank
Henryk Trębicki	56 kg	115.0	3	107.5	1	135	4	357.5	Bronze medal
Jan Wojnowski	60 kg	117.5	5	115	3	150	2	382.5	4
Mieczysław Nowak	60 kg	117.5	5	110	6	147.5	4	375	5
Waldemar Baszanowski	67,5 kg	135	1	135	1 OR	167.5	1 OR	437.5 OR	Gold medal
Marian Zieliński	67,5 kg	135	1	125	4	160	4	420	Bronze medal
Norbert Ozimek	82,5 kg	150	3	140	4	182.5	3	472.5	Bronze medal
Marek Gołąb	90 kg	165	2	145	4	185	5	495	Bronze medal

== Wrestling ==
Men's freestyle

Athlete	Event	Elimination Pool						Final round	
Athlete	Event	Round 1 Result	Round 2 Result	Round 3 Result	Round 4 Result	Round 5 Result	Round 6 Result	Final round Result	Rank
Zbigniew Żedzicki	−57 kg	Horst Mayer (GDR); W P	Marco Terán (ECU); W T 2:10	Yojiro Uetake (JPN); L P	Bazaryn Sükhbaatar (MGL); W P	Ivan Shavov (BUL); W P	Did not advance		6
Tadeusz Godyń	−63 kg	Tsedendambyn Natsagdorj (MGL); L P	Yelkan Tedeyev (URS); L T 9:04	Did not advance					17
Janusz Pająk	−70 kg	Aka-Jahan Dastagir (AFG); W P	Severino Aguilar Fruto (PAN); W T 1:14	Iwao Horiuchi (JPN); L P	Wayne Wells (USA); L P	Did not advance			9
Jan Wypiorczyk	−87 kg	Shigeru Endo (JPN); W E	Boris Michail Gurevich (URS); L T 10:36	Did not advance					16
Ryszard Długosz	−97 kg	Alexis Nihon (JPN); W T 1:33	Edward Millard (CAN); L P	Nicolae Negut (ROU); W P	Ahmet Ayik (TUR); L P	Did not advance			7
Wiesław Bocheński	+97 kg	Ölziisaikhany Erdene-Ochir (MGL); L P	Wilfried Dietrich (FRG); L DQ	Did not advance					10

Men's Greco-Roman

Athlete	Event	Elimination Pool						Final round	
Athlete	Event	Round 1 Result	Round 2 Result	Round 3 Result	Round 4 Result	Round 5 Result	Round 6 Result	Final round Result	Rank
Jan Michalik	−52 kg	Gheorghe Stoiciu (ROU); L P	Jussi Vesterinen (FIN); W P	Did not advance					19
Józef Lipień	−57 kg	Kaya Ozcan (TUR); L P	Cheon-Yeong An (KOR); L E	Risto Bjorlin (FIN); L T 9:00	Did not advance				16
Tadeusz Godyń	−63 kg	Nikolaos Lazarou (GRE); L P	António Morais (POR); L DQ	Did not advance					16
Adam Ostrowski	−78 kg	Dimitrios Savvas (GRE); W E	Milan Nenadic (YUG); W P	Jan Karstrom (SWE); L P	Did not advance				11
Czesław Kwieciński	−87 kg	László Sillai (HUN); W P	Julio Graffigna (ARG); W T 7:54	Valentin Oleynik (URS); L P	Richard Baughman (USA); L P	Did not advance			7
Wacław Orłowski	-97 kg	Nikolai Yakovenko (URS); L P	Takeshi Nagao (JPN); W T 2:42	Tore Hem (NOR); L P	Did not advance				6
Edward Wojda	+97 kg	Arje Nadbornik (FIN); W T 2:24	Bekir Aksu (TUR); L E	Sten Svensson (SWE); L P	Anatoly Roshchin (URS); L T 5:29	Did not advance			8
