= Belgium at the 1968 Summer Olympics =

- IOC code: BEL
- NOC: Belgian Olympic Committee

in Mexico City
- Competitors: 82 (77 men and 5 women) in 13 sports
- Flag bearer: Gaston Roelants
- Medals Ranked 36th: Gold 0 Silver 1 Bronze 1 Total 2

Summer Olympics appearances (overview)
- 1900; 1904; 1908; 1912; 1920; 1924; 1928; 1932; 1936; 1948; 1952; 1956; 1960; 1964; 1968; 1972; 1976; 1980; 1984; 1988; 1992; 1996; 2000; 2004; 2008; 2012; 2016; 2020; 2024; 2028

Other related appearances
- 1906 Intercalated Games

Belgium competed at the 1968 Summer Olympics in Mexico City, Mexico. 82 competitors, 77 men and 5 women, took part in 55 events in 13 sports.

== Medalists ==
Medal	Name	Sport	Event	Date
Silver	Serge Reding	Weightlifting	Men's Heavyweight	
Bronze	Daniel Goens; Robert van Lancker	Cycling	Men's Tandem	

== Cycling ==
Fifteen cyclists represented Belgium in 1968.

Individual road race

- Jean-Pierre Monseré
- Roger De Vlaeminck
- André Dierickx
- Jozef Schoeters

Team time trial

- Michel Coulon
- Frans Mintjens
- Marcel Grifnée
- Englebert Opdebeeck

Sprint

- Robert Van Lancker
- Daniel Goens

1000m time trial

- Dirk Baert

Tandem

- Daniel Goens
- Robert Van Lancker

Individual pursuit

- Paul Crapez

Team pursuit

- Ernest Bens
- Ronny Vanmarcke
- Willy Debosscher
- Paul Crapez

== Fencing ==
Three fencers, all men, represented Belgium in 1968.

Men's foil

- Michel Constandt
- Florent Bessemans

Men's épée

- Michel Constandt
- Florent Bessemans

Men's sabre

- Yves Brasseur

== Sailing ==
- Jacques Rogge

== Shooting ==
Three shooters, all men, represented Belgium in 1968.

50 m rifle, three positions

- Frans Lafortune

50 m rifle, prone

- Frans Lafortune

Trap

- Guy Rénard

Skeet

- Francis Cornet

== Swimming ==
Men

Athlete	Event	Heat		Semifinal		Final	
Athlete	Event	Time	Rank	Time	Rank	Time	Rank
François Simons	100 m freestyle	55.5	=17 Q	55.3	18	Did not advance	
Herman Verbauwen	100 m freestyle	57.5	45	Did not advance			
Jacques Henrard	1500 m freestyle	18:38.2	19	—N/a		Did not advance	
Herman Verbauwen	100 m backstroke	1:04.6	=22	Did not advance			
Joseph Meyten	100 m butterfly	1:02.2	=34	Did not advance			
François Simons	200 m individual medley	2:22.5	20	—N/a		Did not advance	
Jacques Henrard	400 m individual medley	5:17.0	24	—N/a		Did not advance	

Women

Athlete	Event	Heat		Semifinal		Final	
Athlete	Event	Time	Rank	Time	Rank	Time	Rank
Francine Dauven	100 m backstroke	1:15.3	33	Did not advance			
Francine Dauven	200 m backstroke	2:43.5	26	—N/a		Did not advance	
Carla Galle	200 m individual medley	2:40.9	19	—N/a		Did not advance	
Carla Galle	400 m individual medley	5:55.2	22	—N/a		Did not advance	

== Volleyball ==
Men's Team Competition

- Round Robin
  - Defeated Brazil (3-1)
  - Lost to Bulgaria (0-3)
  - Lost to Poland (0-3)
  - Lost to East Germany (0-3)
  - Lost to Japan (0-3)
  - Defeated Mexico (3-2)
  - Lost to Czechoslovakia (0-3)
  - Lost to Soviet Union (0-3)
  - Lost to United States (0-3) → 8th place
- Team Roster
