= West Germany at the 1968 Summer Olympics =

- Flag of Germany superimposed with the Olympic rings
- IOC code: FRG (ALE used at these Games)
- NOC: National Olympic Committee for Germany

in Mexico City
- Competitors: 275 (232 men, 43 women) in 17 sports
- Flag bearer: Wilfried Dietrich
- Medals Ranked 8th: Gold 5 Silver 11 Bronze 10 Total 26

Summer Olympics appearances (overview)
- 1968; 1972; 1976; 1980; 1984; 1988

Other related appearances
- Germany (1896–1936, 1952, 1992–pres.); Saar (1952); United Team of Germany (1956–1964)

Athletes from West Germany (Federal Republic of Germany) competed at the 1968 Summer Olympics in Mexico City, Mexico. It was the first time that East Germany (German Democratic Republic) and West Germany sent separate teams to the Summer Olympic Games. 275 competitors, 232 men and 43 women, took part in 154 events in 17 sports for West Germany. As the country hosted the next Olympics in Munich, the West German flag was raised at the closing ceremony.

== Medalists ==
=== Gold ===
- Ingrid Becker — Athletics, Women's Pentathlon
- Roswitha Esser, Annemarie Zimmermann — Canoeing, K2 500 m Kayak Pairs
- Josef Neckermann, Reiner Klimke, Liselott Linsenhoff — Equestrian, Dressage Team
- Horst Meyer, Wolfgang Hottenrott, Dirk Schreyer, Egbert Hirschfelder, Rüdiger Henning, Jörg Siebert, Lutz Ulbricht, Niko Ott, Gunther Tiersch — Rowing, Men's Eight
- Bernd Klingner — Shooting, 50 m Rifle Three Positions

=== Silver ===
- Gerhard Hennige — Athletics, Men's 400 m Hurdles
- Claus Schiprowski — Athletics, Men's Pole Vault
- Hans-Joachim Walde — Athletics, Men's Decathlon
- Liesel Westermann — Athletics, Women's Discus Throw
- Detlef Lewe — Canoeing, Men's C1 1000 m Canoe Singles
- Renate Breuer — Canoeing, Women's K1 500 m Kayak Singles
- Karl Link, Udo Hempel, Karlheinz Henrichs, Jürgen Kissner — Cycling, Men's Team Pursuit
- Josef Neckermann — Equestrian, Dressage Individual
- Jochen Meißner — Rowing, Men's Single Sculls
- Ulli Libor, Peter Naumann — Sailing, Flying Dutchman
- Heinz Mertel — Shooting, 50 m Pistol

=== Bronze ===
- Bodo Tümmler — Athletics, Men's 1500 metres
- Helmar Müller, Manfred Kinder, Gerhard Hennige, Martin Jellinghaus — Athletics, Men's 4 × 400 m Relay
- Kurt Bendlin — Athletics, Men's Decathlon
- Günther Meier — Boxing, Men's Light Middleweight
- Reiner Klimke — Equestrian, Dressage Individual
- Hermann Schridde, Alwin Schockemöhle, Hans Günter Winkler — Equestrian, Jumping Team
- Konrad Wirnhier — Shooting, Skeet
- Michael Holthaus — Swimming, Men's 400 m Individual Medley
- Angelika Kraus, Uta Frommater, Heike Hustede, Heidemarie Reineck — Swimming, Women's 4 × 100 m Medley Relay
- Wilfried Dietrich — Wrestling, Men's Freestyle Heavyweight

== Cycling ==
Fourteen cyclists represented West Germany in 1968.

Individual road race

- Burkhard Ebert
- Jürgen Tschan
- Ortwin Czarnowski
- Dieter Koslar

Team time trial

- Burkhard Ebert
- Jürgen Tschan
- Ortwin Czarnowski
- Dieter Koslar

Sprint

- Jürgen Barth

1000 m time trial

- Herbert Honz

Tandem

- Klaus Kobusch
- Martin Stenzel

Individual pursuit

- Rupert Kratzer

Team pursuit

- Udo Hempel
- Karl Link
- Karl Heinz Henrichs
- Jürgen Kissner
- Rainer Podlesch

== Diving ==
Men

Athlete	Event	Preliminary		Final			
Athlete	Event	Points	Rank	Points	Rank	Total	Rank
Norbert Huda	3 m springboard	88.43	16	Did not advance			
Ulrich Reff	3 m springboard	95.42	11 Q	44.66	10	140.08	10
Klaus Konzorr	10 m platform	86.69	18	Did not advance			
Karl-Heinz Schwemmer	10 m platform	89.00	14	Did not advance			
Bernd Wucherpfennig	10 m platform	89.66	12 Q	39.83	11	129.49	12

Women

Athlete	Event	Preliminary		Final			
Athlete	Event	Points	Rank	Points	Rank	Total	Rank
Angelika Hilbert	3 m springboard	86.83	11 Q	42.00	7	128.83	9
Ingeborg Busch	10 m platform	47.22	6 Q	38.09	11	85.31	11
Regina Krause	10 m platform	46.77	8 Q	46.31	7	93.08	6

== Fencing ==
20 fencers, 15 men and 5 women, represented West Germany in 1968.

Men's foil

- Tim Gerresheim
- Friedrich Wessel
- Dieter Wellmann

Men's team foil

- Jürgen Theuerkauff, Friedrich Wessel, Tim Gerresheim, Jürgen Brecht, Dieter Wellmann

Men's épée

- Fritz Zimmermann
- Franz Rompza
- Dieter Jung

Men's team épée

- Dieter Jung, Franz Rompza, Fritz Zimmermann, Max Geuter, Paul Gnaier

Men's sabre

- Paul Wischeidt
- Walter Köstner
- Volker Duschner

Men's team sabre

- Percy Borucki, Walter Köstner, Paul Wischeidt, Klaus Allisat, Volker Duschner

Women's foil

- Heidi Schmid
- Helga Mees
- Monika Pulch

Women's team foil

- Heidi Schmid, Helga Koch, Gundi Theuerkauff, Monika Pulch, Helga Mees

== Field hockey ==
Eighteen male field hockey players competed in 1968, when the West German team finished in 4th place.

- Wolfgang Rott
- Günther Krauss
- Utz Aichinger
- Jürgen Wein
- Klaus Greinert
- Uli Vos
- Detlev Kittstein
- Norbert Schuler
- Fritz Schmidt
- Carsten Keller
- Michael Krause
- Wolfgang Müller
- Dirk Michel
- Eckardt Suhl
- Ulrich Sloma
- Hermann End
- Friedrich Josten
- Wolfgang Baumgart

== Modern pentathlon ==
Three male pentathletes represented West Germany in 1968.

Individual

- Elmar Frings
- Heiner Thade
- Hans Jürgen Todt

Team

- Elmar Frings
- Heiner Thade
- Hans Jürgen Todt

== Rowing ==
West Germany had 26 male rowers participate in all seven rowing events in 1968.

Men's single sculls – 2nd place ( silver medal)

- Jochen Meißner

Men's double sculls

- Wolfgang Glock
- Udo Hild

Men's coxless pair

- Günther Karl
- Franz Held

Men's coxed pair

- Bernhard Hiesinger
- Rolf Hartung
- Lutz Benter (cox)

Men's coxless four

- Thomas Hitzbleck
- Manfred Weinreich
- Volkhart Buchter
- Jochen Heck

Men's coxed four

- Niko Ott
- Peter Berger
- Udo Brecht
- Hans-Johann Färber
- Stefan Armbruster (cox)

Men's eight – 1st place ( gold medal)

- Horst Meyer
- Dirk Schreyer
- Rüdiger Henning
- Wolfgang Hottenrott
- Lutz Ulbricht
- Egbert Hirschfelder
- Jörg Siebert
- Niko Ott
- Gunther Tiersch (cox)
- Roland Böse (heat 1)

== Shooting ==
Twelve shooters, all men, represented West Germany in 1968. Bernd Klingner won gold in the 50 m rifle, three positions and Konrad Wirnhier won bronze in the skeet.

25 m pistol

- Erich Masurat
- Hans Standl

50 m pistol

- Heinz Mertel
- Kurt Meyer

50 m rifle, three positions

- Bernd Klingner
- Peter Kohnke

50 m rifle, prone

- Karl Wenk
- Klaus Zähringer

Trap

- Werner Bühse
- Erich Gehmann

Skeet

- Konrad Wirnhier
- Karl Meyer zu Hölsen

== Water polo ==
Men's Team Competition

- Preliminary Round (Group A)

- Defeated Spain (5:3)
- Lost to Hungary (4:6)
- Lost to Soviet Union (3:6)
- Defeated Brazil (10:5)
- Lost to Cuba (6:7)
- Lost to United States (5:7)

- Classification Matches

- 9th/12th place: Defeated Mexico (6:3)
- 9th/10th place: Lost to Spain (5:7) → Tenth place

- Team Roster

- Dietmar Seiz
- Günter Kilian
- Heinz Kleimeier
- Hermann Haverkamp
- Kurt Schuhmann
- Ludger Weeke
- Ludwig Ott
- Peter Teicher
- Wolf-Rüdiger Schulz
- Johannes Hoffmeister
- Lajos Nagy
