= Switzerland at the 1968 Summer Olympics =

- IOC code: SUI
- NOC: Swiss Olympic Association

in Mexico City, Mexico 12 October 1968 – 27 October 1968
- Competitors: 85 (81 men and 4 women) in 12 sports
- Flag bearer: Paul Weier
- Medals Ranked 33rd: Gold 0 Silver 1 Bronze 4 Total 5

Summer Olympics appearances (overview)
- 1896; 1900; 1904; 1908; 1912; 1920; 1924; 1928; 1932; 1936; 1948; 1952; 1956; 1960; 1964; 1968; 1972; 1976; 1980; 1984; 1988; 1992; 1996; 2000; 2004; 2008; 2012; 2016; 2020; 2024

Other related appearances
- 1906 Intercalated Games

Switzerland competed at the 1968 Summer Olympics in Mexico City, Mexico. 85 competitors, 81 men and 4 women, took part in 68 events in 12 sports.

== Medalists ==
=== Silver ===
- Bernhard Dunand, Louis Noverraz and Marcel Stern — Sailing, Men's 5½ Meter Class

=== Bronze ===
- Xaver Kurmann — Cycling, Men's 4000m Individual Pursuit
- Henri Chammartin, Gustav Fischer and Marianne Gossweiler — Equestrian, Dressage Team Competition
- Peter Bolliger, Gottlieb Fröhlich, Jakob Grob, Denis Oswald and Hugo Waser — Rowing, Men's Coxed Fours
- Kurt Müller — Shooting, Men's Free Rifle, Three Positions

== Cycling ==
Four cyclists represented Switzerland in 1968.

Individual road race

- Bruno Hubschmid

Individual pursuit

- Xaver Kurmann

Team pursuit

- Walter Richard
- Jürgen Schneider
- Bruno Hubschmid
- Xaver Kurmann

== Fencing ==
Five fencers, all men, represented Switzerland in 1968.

Men's épée

- Peter Lötscher
- Michel Steininger
- Alexandre Bretholz

Men's team épée

- Denys Chamay, Peter Lötscher, Christian Kauter, Alexandre Bretholz, Michel Steininger

== Modern pentathlon ==
One male pentathlete represented Switzerland in 1968.

Individual

- Alex Tschui

== Shooting ==
Ten shooters, all men, represented Switzerland in 1968. Kurt Müller won bronze in the 300 m rifle, three positions event.

25 m pistol

- Kurt Klingler
- Josef Ziltener

50 m pistol

- Ernst Stoll
- Albert Späni

300 m rifle, three positions

- Kurt Müller
- Erwin Vogt

50 m rifle, three positions

- Kurt Müller
- Peter Ruch

50 m rifle, prone

- Hansruedi Schafroth
- Hans Sinniger

Skeet

- Paul Vittet
