= Lars-Erik Larsson (disambiguation) =

Lars-Erik Larsson may refer to:

- Lars-Erik Larsson (1908–1986), Swedish composer
- Lars-Erik Larsson (rower) (born 1937), Swedish rower
- Lars-Erik Larsson (fencer) (born 1944), Swedish fencer
