= Sloma =

Sloma is a surname. It is derived from Shlomo, the Hebrew name of Solomon.

Sloma is a surname. It is derived from the Polish Slavonic word słoma. "The word słoma in the sense ‘dry cereal stalks’, recorded in Polish since the 15th c., is a Slavic form (cf. Czech sláma, Russian solóma, Serbo-Croatian slama etc.) and is related to the German Halm ‘stalk’, Lat. culmus ‘stalk, blade of grass’, Greek kalamos, Old Indic calakas ‘stalk’."

Notable people with the surname include:

- Michał Słoma (born 1982), Polish rower
- Sam Sloma (born 1982), English football player
- Ulrich Sloma (born 1942), German field hockey player
