= Péter Bakonyi =

Péter Bakonyi may refer to:

- Peter Bakonyi (fencer, born 1933) (1933–1997), Hungarian-born Olympic foil and epee fencer who competed for Canada
- Péter Bakonyi (fencer, born 1938), Hungarian Olympic sabre fencer
