= Sweden at the 1968 Summer Olympics =

- IOC code: SWE (SUE used at these Games)
- NOC: Swedish Olympic Committee

in Mexico City
- Competitors: 100 (86 men and 14 women) in 13 sports
- Flag bearer: Rolf Peterson
- Medals Ranked 20th: Gold 2 Silver 1 Bronze 1 Total 4

Summer Olympics appearances (overview)
- 1896; 1900; 1904; 1908; 1912; 1920; 1924; 1928; 1932; 1936; 1948; 1952; 1956; 1960; 1964; 1968; 1972; 1976; 1980; 1984; 1988; 1992; 1996; 2000; 2004; 2008; 2012; 2016; 2020; 2024; 2028

Other related appearances
- 1906 Intercalated Games

Sweden competed at the 1968 Summer Olympics in Mexico City, Mexico. 100 competitors, 86 men and 14 women, took part in 95 events in 13 sports.

This was Sweden's worst Olympics

== Medalists ==
=== Gold ===
- Björn Ferm — Modern Pentathlon, Men's Individual Competition
- Ulf Sundelin, Peter Sundelin, and Jörgen Sundelin — Sailing, Men's 5½ Meter Class

=== Silver ===
- Tomas Pettersson, Erik Pettersson, Gösta Pettersson, and Sture Pettersson — Cycling, Men's Team Time Trial

=== Bronze ===
- Gösta Pettersson — Cycling, Men's Road Race

== Cycling ==
Six cyclists represented Sweden in 1968.

Individual road race

- Gösta Pettersson
- Tomas Pettersson
- Erik Pettersson
- Curt Söderlund

Team time trial

- Erik Pettersson
- Gösta Pettersson
- Sture Pettersson
- Tomas Pettersson

1000m time trial

- Jupp Ripfel

Individual pursuit

- Gösta Pettersson

Team pursuit

- Gösta Pettersson
- Sture Pettersson
- Erik Pettersson
- Tomas Pettersson

== Diving ==
Men

Athlete	Event	Preliminary		Final			
Athlete	Event	Points	Rank	Points	Rank	Total	Rank
Tord Andersson	3 m springboard	99.58	5 Q	51.92	7	151.50	7
Tord Andersson	10 m platform	92.06	8 Q	39.15	12	131.21	11

== Fencing ==
Six fencers, five men and one woman, represented Sweden in 1968.

Men's épée

- Orvar Lindwall
- Lars-Erik Larsson
- Dicki Sörensen

Men's team épée

- Dicki Sörensen, Orvar Lindwall, Carl von Essen, Lars-Erik Larsson, Rolf Edling

Women's foil

- Kerstin Palm

== Modern pentathlon ==
Three male pentathletes represented Sweden in 1968. Björn Ferm won gold in the individual event.

Individual

- Björn Ferm
- Hans Jacobson
- Hans-Gunnar Liljenwall

Team

- Björn Ferm
- Hans Jacobson
- Hans-Gunnar Liljenwall

== Shooting ==
Nine shooters, all men, represented Sweden in 1968.

25 m pistol

- Waldemar Califf
- Stig Berntsson

50 m pistol

- Leif Larsson
- Börje Nilsson

300 m rifle, three positions

- Sven Johansson
- Kurt Johansson

50 m rifle, three positions

- Sven Johansson
- Kurt Johansson

50 m rifle, prone

- Sven Johansson
- Kurt Johansson

Trap

- Sten Karlsson

Skeet

- Arne Karlsson
- Arne Orrgård
