= Annick Level =

French fencer

Personal information
- Born: 5 December 1942 (age 83) Tarbes, France

Sport
- Sport: Fencing
Medal record
Representing France
World Championships
Bronze medal – third place	1966 Moscow	Team foil
Bronze medal – third place	1970 Ankara	Team foil
Summer Universiade
Gold medal – first place	1963 Porto Alegre	Team foil
Silver medal – second place	1963 Porto Alegre	Individual foil
Silver medal – second place	1967 Tokyo	Individual foil
Bronze medal – third place	1965 Budapest	Team foil

Annick Level (born 5 December 1942) is a French foil fencer. She competed at the 1964 and 1968 Summer Olympics.
