= Miklós Meszéna =

Hungarian fencer (1940–1995)

Personal information
- Born: 14 December 1940 Budapest, Hungary
- Died: 29 July 1995 (aged 54) Budapest, Hungary

Sport
- Sport: Fencing
Medal record
Representing Hungary
Olympic Games
Bronze medal – third place	1968 Mexico City	Team sabre
World Championships
Gold medal – first place	1966 Moscow	Team sabre
Silver medal – second place	1962 Buenos Aires	Team sabre
Silver medal – second place	1965 Paris	Individual sabre
Silver medal – second place	1967 Montreal	Team sabre
Silver medal – second place	1970 Ankara	Team sabre
Silver medal – second place	1971 Vienna	Team sabre
Bronze medal – third place	1961 Turin	Team sabre
Bronze medal – third place	1963 Gdansk	Team sabre
Bronze medal – third place	1969 Havana	Team sabre
Summer Universiade
Gold medal – first place	1961 Sofia	Team sabre
Gold medal – first place	1963 Porto Alegre	Team sabre
Gold medal – first place	1965 Budapest	Individual sabre
Gold medal – first place	1965 Budapest	Team sabre

Miklós Meszéna (14 December 1940 – 29 July 1995) was a Hungarian fencer. He won a bronze medal in the team sabre event at the 1968 Summer Olympics. At the 1964 Summer Olympics, he finished in fifth place.
