= Bohdan Gonsior =

Polish fencer (born 1937)

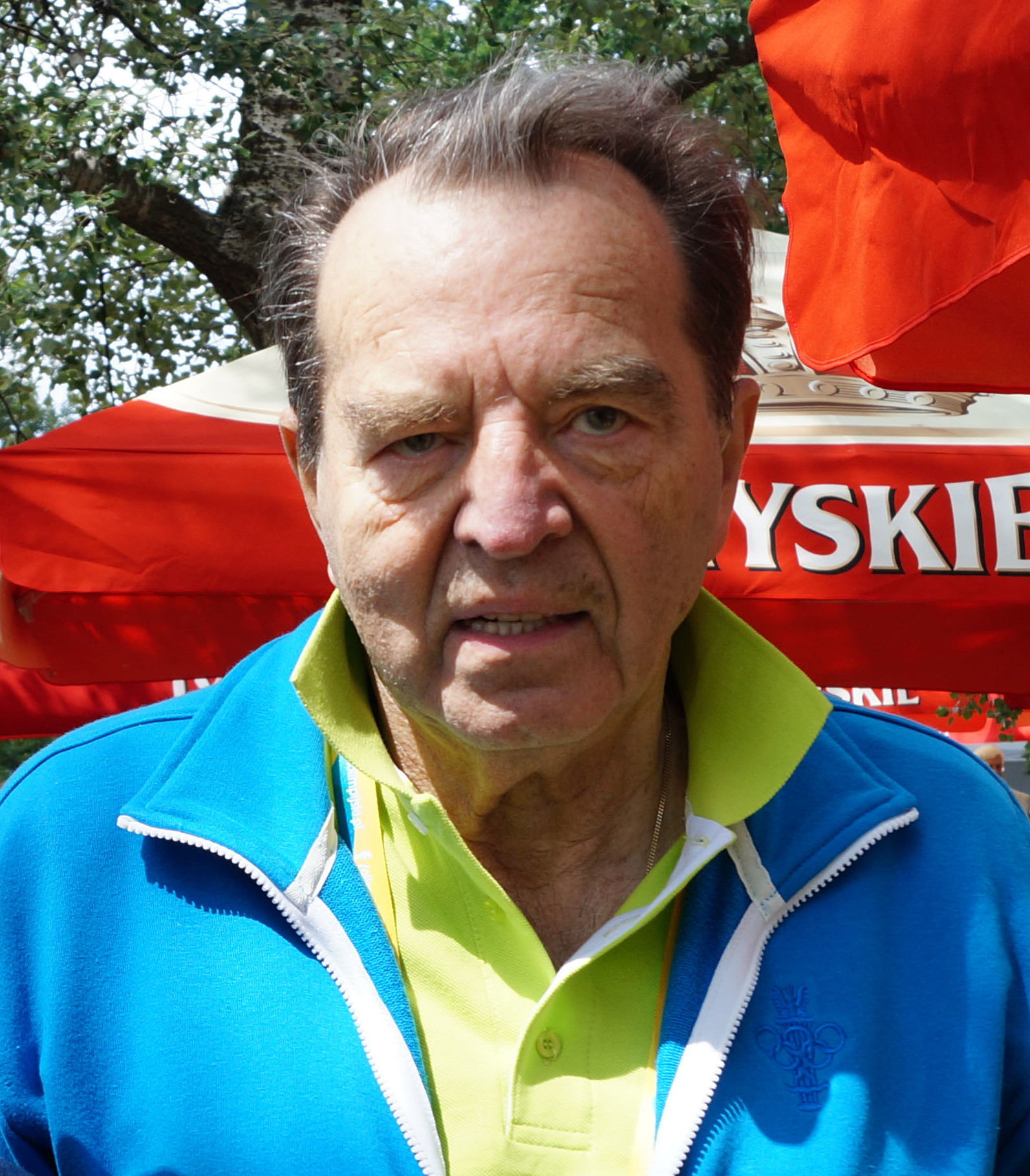
- Gonsior in 2016

Personal information
- Full name: Bogdan Kazimierz Gonsior
- Born: 16 February 1937 (age 89) Chorzów, Poland
- Height: 196 cm (6 ft 5 in)
- Weight: 82 kg (181 lb)
Medal record
Representing Poland
Olympic Games
Bronze medal – third place	1968 Mexico City	Team épée
World Championships
Gold medal – first place	1963 Gdansk	Team épée
Silver medal – second place	1970 Ankara	Team épée
Bronze medal – third place	1966 Moscow	Individual épée
Summer Universiade
Gold medal – first place	1961 Sofia	Individual épée
Gold medal – first place	1963 Porto Alegre	Team foil
Gold medal – first place	1963 Porto Alegre	Team épée
Silver medal – second place	1959 Turin	Team épée
Bronze medal – third place	1965 Budapest	Team épée

Bogdan Kazimierz Gonsior (also spelled Bohdan, born 16 February 1937) is a Polish fencer. He won a bronze medal in the team épée event at the 1968 Summer Olympics.
