= Portugal at the 1968 Summer Olympics =

- IOC code: POR
- NOC: Olympic Committee of Portugal

in Mexico City
- Competitors: 20 in 6 sports
- Officials: 1
- Medals: Gold 0 Silver 0 Bronze 0 Total 0

Summer Olympics appearances (overview)
- 1912; 1920; 1924; 1928; 1932; 1936; 1948; 1952; 1956; 1960; 1964; 1968; 1972; 1976; 1980; 1984; 1988; 1992; 1996; 2000; 2004; 2008; 2012; 2016; 2020; 2024

Portugal competed at the 1968 Summer Olympics in Mexico City, Mexico. 20 competitors, 19 men and 1 woman, took part in 24 events in 6 sports.

== Athletics ==
Men's 3000m Steeplechase:

- Manuel F. Oliveira — qualifiers: 8th (heat 1)

== Fencing ==
Four fencers, all men, represented Portugal in 1968.

Men's épée

- Francisco da Silva — 1st round: 7th (poule D)
- João de Abreu — 1st round: 5th (poule G)
- José Pinheiro — 1st round: 5th (poule C)

Men's team épée

- Francisco da Silva, Hélder Reis, João de Abreu and José Pinheiro — 2nd round: 2nd (poule B)

== Gymnastics ==
Men's Individual All-Round Competition:

- José Filipe Abreu — 82nd (104,90 points)
  1. Floor — 51st (18,00)
  2. Pommelled Horse — 94th (15,50)
  3. Rings — 47th (18,00)
  4. Vault — 71st (17,95)
  5. Parallel Bars — 88th (17,60)
  6. Horizontal Bar — 99th (16,90)

Women's Individual All-Round Competition:

- Esbela Fonseca — 85th (66,70 points)
  1. Floor — 71st (17,35)
  2. Asymmetrical Bars — 72nd (16,95)
  3. Balance Beam — 91st (15,45)
  4. Vault — 88th (16,95)

== Sailing ==
Dragon:

- Melo Menezes (helm), Fernando Lima and Sarafana Weck — 17th (124 points)

Finn:

- Bernardo Santos — 31st (196 points)

Flying Dutchman:

- Adriano da Silva and Orlando Sena (helm) — 27th (178 points)

Star:

- José Quina and Mário Quina (helm) — 17th (119 points)

== Weightlifting ==
Featherweight:

- Luís Ramos — disqualified

== Wrestling ==
Flyweight (–52 kg):

- Leonel Duarte — 2nd round

Bantamweight (–57 kg):

- Luís Grilo — 2nd round

Featherweight (–63 kg):

- Adriano Morais — 2nd round

Lightweight (–70 kg):

- Luís Galantinho — 3rd round

== Officials ==
- Raul Worm (chief of mission)
- Bernardo Mendes de Almeida (sailing)

== Notes ==
- Mexico City Organizing Committee of the Games of the XIX Olympiad (1969). Official Report of the XIX Olympiad Volume 3: The Games (Retrieved on November 7, 2006)
