= Fritz Zimmermann =

German fencer (born 1931)

Personal information
- Born: 29 March 1931 Düsseldorf, Weimar Republic

Sport
- Sport: Fencing

Fritz Zimmermann (born 29 March 1931) is a German former fencer.

== Career ==
Zimmermann won the German national championships in épée in both 1955 and 1957. He represented the United Team of Germany at the 1960 Summer Olympics and competed in the men's team épée, where Germany came equal fifth.

In 1964, Zimmermann was omitted from the Olympic team. The criticism had been leveled against him that he screamed during bouts, a practice that has now become commonplace.

Zimmerman returned to the Olympics in 1968, representing West Germany in both the individual épée and team épée.
