= Jacques Henrard =

Belgian swimmer

Personal information
- Born: 23 July 1951 (age 74) Péruwelz, Belgium

Sport
- Sport: Swimming

Jacques Henrard (born 23 July 1951) is a Belgian former freestyle and medley swimmer. He competed in two events at the 1968 Summer Olympics.
