= Yves Boissier =

French fencer

Personal information
- Born: 27 January 1944 (age 82) Montélimar, France

Sport
- Sport: Fencing

Yves Boissier (born 27 January 1944) is a French fencer. He competed in the team épée event at the 1968 Summer Olympics.
