= Dieter Koslar =

German cyclist

Personal information
- Born: 6 May 1940 Cologne, Germany
- Died: 13 August 2002 (aged 62) Cologne, Germany

Cycling career
- Sport: Cycling

Dieter Koslar (6 May 1940 – 13 August 2002) was a German cyclist. He competed in the individual road race and the team time trial events at the 1968 Summer Olympics.
