= Jerzy Kruża =

Polish gymnast

- Full name: Jerzy Andrzej Kruża
- Born: 29 November 1943 (age 82) Ruda Śląska, Nazi Germany
- Height: 1.76 m (5 ft 9 in)

Gymnastics career
- Discipline: Men's artistic gymnastics
- Country represented: Poland
- Club: Górnik Radlin

Jerzy Andrzej Kruża (born 29 November 1943) is a Polish gymnast. He competed at the 1968 Summer Olympics and the 1972 Summer Olympics.
