= Iosif Vitebskiy =

Ukrainian fencer (1938–2024)

Personal information
- Full name: Иосиф Давидович Витебский
- Born: 9 January 1938 Kyiv, Ukrainian SSR, USSR
- Died: 7 December 2024 (aged 86)
- Height: 6 ft 2 in (188 cm)
- Weight: 185 lb (84 kg)

Sport
- Country: Soviet Union
- Sport: Fencing
- Event: Épée
- Club: Dynamo
Medal record
Men's fencing
Representing Soviet Union
Olympic Games
Silver medal – second place	1968 Mexico City	Team épée

Iosif Davidovich Vitebskiy (Russian: Иосиф Давидович Витебский; 9 January 1938 – 7 December 2024) was a Soviet Ukrainian Olympic medalist and world champion épée fencer, and later a U.S. fencing coach.

== Early life ==
Vitebskiy was born in Kyiv, Ukrainian SSR, Soviet Union, and was Jewish. He attended Kyiv State University, where he studied physical culture and sport.

== Fencing career ==
During his fencing career, Vitebskiy trained at Dynamo in Kyiv. He was a member of the Soviet Union and Ukrainian national teams, and won 19 medals in national championships (10 gold, 6 silver, and three bronze). He won several tournaments in Europe and the Soviet Union, and won in the team event at the World Fencing Championships in 1967, 1968, and 1969. He also won a silver medal in team épée at the 1968 Summer Olympics in Mexico City at the age of 30.

Vitebskiy won the Veteran 60 Men’s Épée category at the Summer US National Championships in Charlotte, North Carolina, in 1999.

== Coaching ==
Vitebskiy was head coach of the Ukraine Republic National Team for 13 years, and then served for 10 years (1988–98) as the Director of the school for high sports achievements at the State University of Ukraine. He served for a dozen years as an assistant coach at the University of Pennsylvania of the University of Pennsylvania Quakers fencing team.

== Personal life and death ==
Vitebskiy and his wife, Emma had two sons, Dmitriy and Alex, and lived in Philadelphia.

Vitebskiy died on 7 December 2024, at the age of 86.

== See also ==
- List of Jews in sports § Fencing
- List of Jewish Olympic medalists
