= Andrzej Gonera =

Polish gymnast

- Full name: Andrzej Wojciech Gonera
- Born: 18 February 1939 (age 87) Toruń, Second Polish Republic
- Height: 1.72 m (5 ft 8 in)

Gymnastics career
- Discipline: Men's artistic gymnastics
- Country represented: Poland
- Club: Legia Warsaw

Andrzej Wojciech Gonera (born 18 February 1939) is a Polish gymnast. He competed in eight events at the 1968 Summer Olympics.
