= Khalil Kallas =

Lebanese fencer

Personal information
- Born: 1 July 1942 (age 84) Saryne, Lebanon

Sport
- Sport: Fencing

Khalil Kallas (born 1 July 1942) is a Lebanese fencer. He competed in the individual épée event at the 1968 Summer Olympics.
