= Yury Smolyakov =

Soviet fencer (born 1941)

Personal information
- Born: 20 September 1941 (age 85) Voronezh, Russian SFSR, Soviet Union

Sport
- Sport: Fencing
Medal record
Men's fencing
Representing Soviet Union
Olympic Games
Silver medal – second place	1968 Mexico City	Épée, team

Yury Smolyakov (Russian: Юрий Тимофеевич Смоляков; born 20 September 1941) is a Soviet fencer. He won a silver medal in the team épée event at the 1968 Summer Olympics.
