= François Simons =

Belgian swimmer

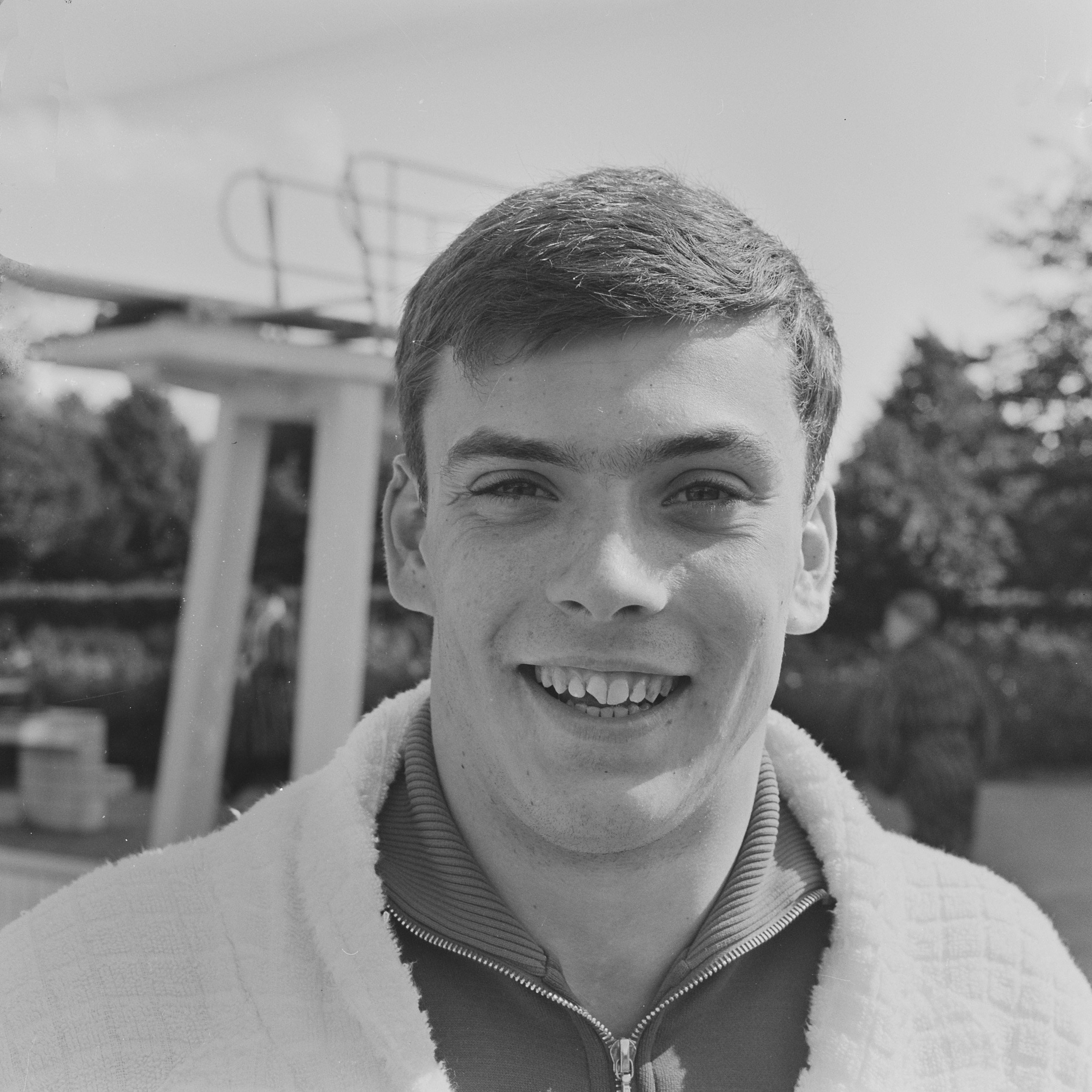
- François Simons in 1965

Personal information
- Born: 25 October 1946 (age 79) Antwerp, Belgium
- Height: 1.83 m (6 ft 0 in)
- Weight: 79 kg (174 lb)

Sport
- Sport: Swimming

François Simons (born 25 October 1946) is a retired Belgian swimmer. He competed at the 1964 and 1968 Summer Olympics in the 100 m and 200 m freestyle but failed to reach the finals.
