= Ludwik Raczyński =

Polish sailor

Personal information
- Nationality: Polish
- Born: 2 May 1943 (age 82); Warsaw, Poland

Sport
- Sport: Sailing

Ludwik Raczyński (born 2 May 1943) is a Polish sailor. He competed at the 1968 Summer Olympics and the 1980 Summer Olympics.
