= Francis Cornet =

Belgian sports shooter

Personal information
- Born: 14 March 1947 (age 79) Etterbeek, Belgium

Sport
- Sport: Sports shooting

Francis Cornet (born 14 March 1947) is a Belgian former sports shooter. He competed at the 1968 Summer Olympics and the 1972 Summer Olympics.
