= Dag Midling =

Norwegian fencer

Personal information
- Born: 18 November 1946 (age 79) Oslo, Norway

Sport
- Sport: Fencing

Dag Midling (born 18 November 1946) is a Norwegian fencer. He competed in the individual épée event at the 1968 Summer Olympics.
