= Peter Bakonyi (fencer, born 1933) =

Canadian fencer (1933–1997)

Personal information
- National team: Canada
- Born: 10 July 1933 Budapest, Hungary
- Died: 26 August 1997 (aged 64) Vancouver, British Columbia, Canada
- Resting place: Schara Tzedeck Cemetery, New Westminster, British Columbia, Canada
- Home town: Vancouver, Canada
- Height: 180 cm (5 ft 11 in)
- Weight: 78 kg (172 lb)

Sport
- Country: Canada
- Sport: Fencing
- Event(s): foil, épée
- University team: Eötvös Loránd University

Achievements and titles
- National finals: 6x Canadian national champion
Medal record
Men's Fencing
British Empire and Commonwealth Games
Bronze medal – third place	1962 Australia	team épée
Silver medal – second place	1966 Jamaica	team épée
Bronze medal – third place	1970 Scotland	team épée
Maccabiah Games
Silver medal – second place	1961 Israel	fencing
Silver medal – second place	1965 Israel	fencing
Silver medal – second place	1969 Israel	fencing
Silver medal – second place	1997 Israel	fencing

Peter Bakonyi (10 July 1933 – 26 August 1997) was a Hungarian-born Canadian Olympic foil and épée fencer. He competed at the 1968 Summer Olympics in Mexico City. He was also a six-time Canadian national fencing champion, 18-time British Columbia fencing champion, three-time medalist at the Commonwealth Games, four-time silver medalist at the Maccabiah Games in Israel.

== Early life ==
Bakonyi was born in Budapest, Hungary, and was Jewish. He met his wife Vera at a function in high school. He attended law school and fenced at Budapesti EAC in Budapest, graduating with a law degree in 1956 at the Faculty of Law of Eötvös Loránd University and trained for the modern pentathlon (épée fencing, swimming, horseback riding, shooting, and cross country running).

In 1957 he and Vera immigrated to Canada from Hungary. They married in Vancouver, Canada, in 1959. Bakonyi switched his career to real estate, and began to train solely in fencing. As of 1968, he worked as a finance manager in the real estate division of Canada Permanent Trust Company.

He and his family lived in Vancouver. His sons Ron Bakonyi and David Bakonyi fenced for Canada, in the late 1980s and early 1990s. Ron won silver medals in the 1981 Maccabiah Games and the 1985 Maccabiah Games, competed at the 1993 Maccabiah Games, and competed in the 1989 World Fencing Championships. David was a member of the Canadian National Fencing Team from 1993 to 1995, and fenced in three Fencing World Championships, and won a gold medal in team epee at the 1989 Maccabiah Games and a silver medal at the 1997 Maccabiah Games in Israel.

== Fencing career ==
Bakonyi was a six-time Canadian national fencing champion, and an 18-time British Columbia fencing champion.

Bakonyi earned a bronze medal for Canada in team épée at the 1962 British Empire and Commonwealth Games (now known as the Commonwealth Games) in Australia, a silver medal in team épée at the 1966 British Empire and Commonwealth Games in Jamaica, and a bronze medal in team épée at the 1970 British Commonwealth Games in Scotland. He also fenced for Canada at the 1963 Pan American Games in São Paulo, Brazil, and the 1967 Pan American Games in Winnipeg, Canada.

He competed at 35 years of age at the 1968 Summer Olympics in Mexico City for Canada in the individual foil, team foil (coming in 11th), individual épée (coming in 17th), and team épée (coming in 11th) events.

Bakonyi won silver medals at the 1961 Maccabiah Games, 1965 Maccabiah Games, 1969 Maccabiah Games, and at 64 years of age at the 1997 Maccabiah Games in Israel, and competed in the 1973 Maccabiah Games.

Bakonyi died suddenly of a stroke in 1997, at 64 years of age.

The annual Peter Bakonyi Men’s Épée World Cup (formerly, Challenge Peter Bakonyi) in Richmond, British Columbia, Canada is named in his honor. In 2020, Bas Verwijlen of the Netherlands won the gold medal.

== See also ==
- List of Commonwealth Games medallists in fencing
- List of Jewish Olympic medalists
