= Zoltán Nemere =

Hungarian fencer (1942–2001)

Personal information
- Born: 20 April 1942 Bokod, Hungary
- Died: 6 May 2001 (aged 59) Felgyő, Hungary

Sport
- Sport: Fencing
Medal record
Men's fencing
Representing Hungary
Olympic Games
| Gold medal – first place | 1964 Tokyo | Team épée |
| Gold medal – first place | 1968 Mexico City | Team épée |
World Championships
| Gold medal – first place | 1965 Paris | Individual épée |
| Gold medal – first place | 1970 Ankara | Team épée |
| Gold medal – first place | 1971 Vienna | Team épée |
| Silver medal – second place | 1969 Havana | Team épée |
| Bronze medal – third place | 1963 Gdansk | Team épée |
| Bronze medal – third place | 1967 Montreal | Team épée |
Summer Universiade
| Gold medal – first place | 1965 Budapest | Individual épée |
| Gold medal – first place | 1965 Budapest | Team épée |
| Silver medal – second place | 1963 Porto Alegre | Team épée |

Zoltán Nemere (20 April 1942 – 6 May 2001) was a Hungarian fencer. He won gold medals in the team épée events at the 1964 and 1968 Summer Olympics.
