= Colm O'Brien =

Irish fencer (1947–1985)

Personal information
- Born: 4 April 1947 Wicklow, Ireland
- Died: 24 March 1985 (aged 37) Miami, Florida, United States

Sport
- Sport: Fencing

Colm Morrogh Vere O'Brien (4 April 1947 – 24 March 1985) was an Irish épée, foil and sabre fencer. He competed in five events at the 1968 Summer Olympics.
