= Florent Bessemans =

Belgian fencer

Personal information
- Born: 2 January 1940 (age 86) Namur, Belgium

Sport
- Sport: Fencing

Florent Bessemans (born 2 January 1940) is a Belgian fencer. He competed in the individual foil and épée events at the 1968 Summer Olympics.
