= Guillermo Obeid =

Argentine fencer

Personal information
- Born: 6 February 1941 Buenos Aires, Argentina
- Died: 2 December 1999 (aged 58) Cesena, Italy

Sport
- Sport: Fencing

Guillermo Obeid (6 February 1941 – 2 December 1999) was an Argentine fencer. He competed in the individual and team épée events at the 1968 Summer Olympics.
