= Michał Butkiewicz =

Polish fencer (born 1942)

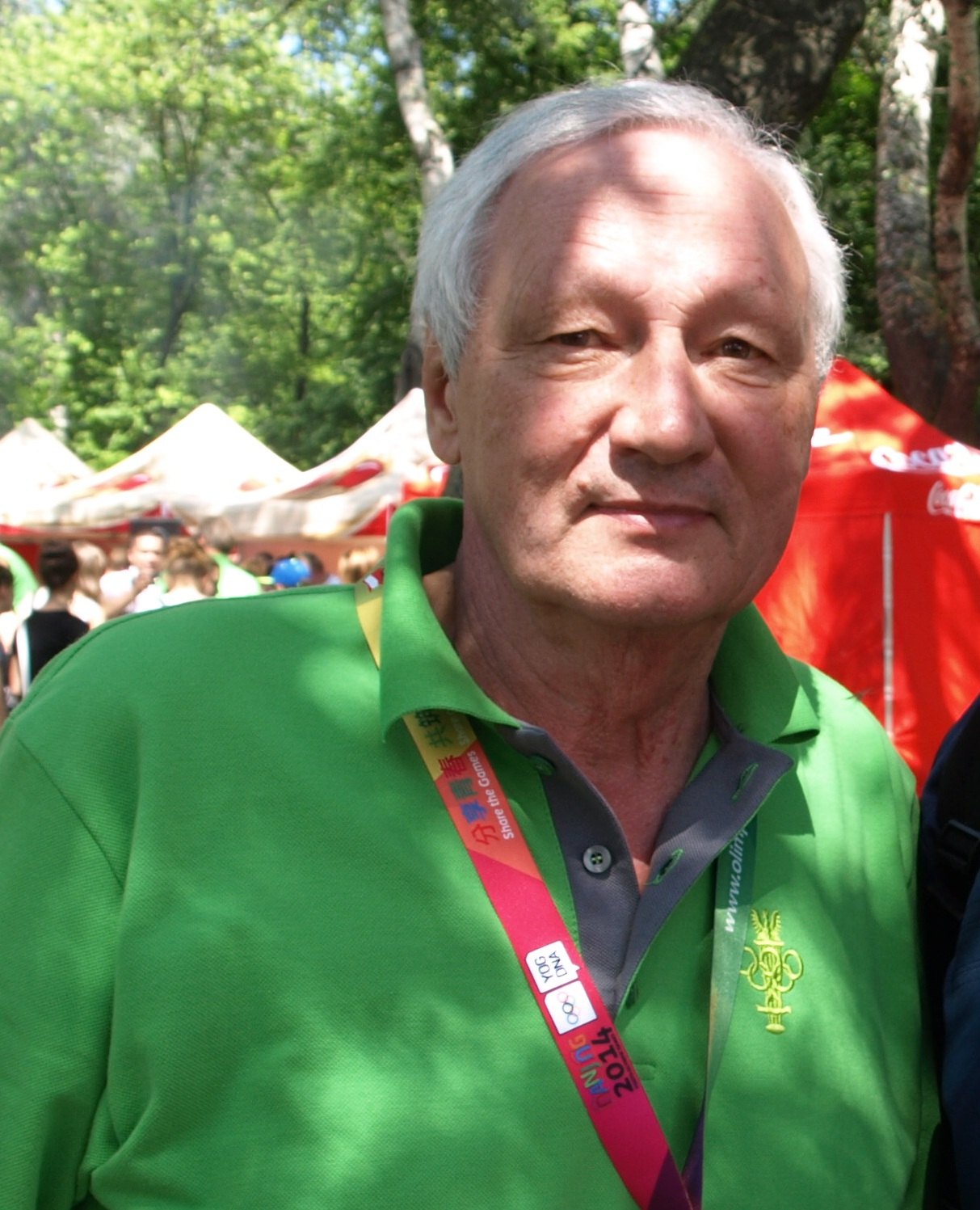

Personal information
- Born: 18 August 1942 (age 83) Warsaw, Poland

Sport
- Sport: Fencing
Medal record
Men's fencing
Representing Poland
Olympic Games
Bronze medal – third place	1968 Mexico City	Épée, team

Michał Butkiewicz (born 18 August 1942) is a Polish fencer. He won a bronze medal in the team épée event at the 1968 Summer Olympics.
