= Valeriano Pérez =

Mexican fencer (born 1941)

Personal information
- Born: 1 May 1941 (age 85) Nuevo León, Mexico

Sport
- Sport: Fencing

Valeriano Pérez Garza (born 1 May 1941) is a Mexican fencer. He competed in the individual and team épée events at the 1968 Summer Olympics.
