= Stephen Netburn =

American fencer

Personal information
- Full name: Stephen Jeffery Netburn
- Born: July 12, 1943 (age 83) New York, New York, United States
- Died: November 2026
- Height: 6 ft 2 in (188 cm)
- Weight: 181 lb (82 kg)

Sport
- Sport: Fencing
- Event: Epee

Stephen Jeffery Netburn (born July 12, 1943) was an American fencer.

He graduated from the University of Pennsylvania in 1965, after transferring from New York University. He was US Épée Champion in 1969. In 1971 Netburn won gold medals in both individual and team épée at the Pan American Games. He competed in the individual and team épée events at the 1968 and 1972 Summer Olympics.

Netburn later worked as a banker.

Netburn died from cancer in November 2026.

== See also ==
- List of USFA Hall of Fame members
