= Aleksey Nikanchikov =

Soviet fencer

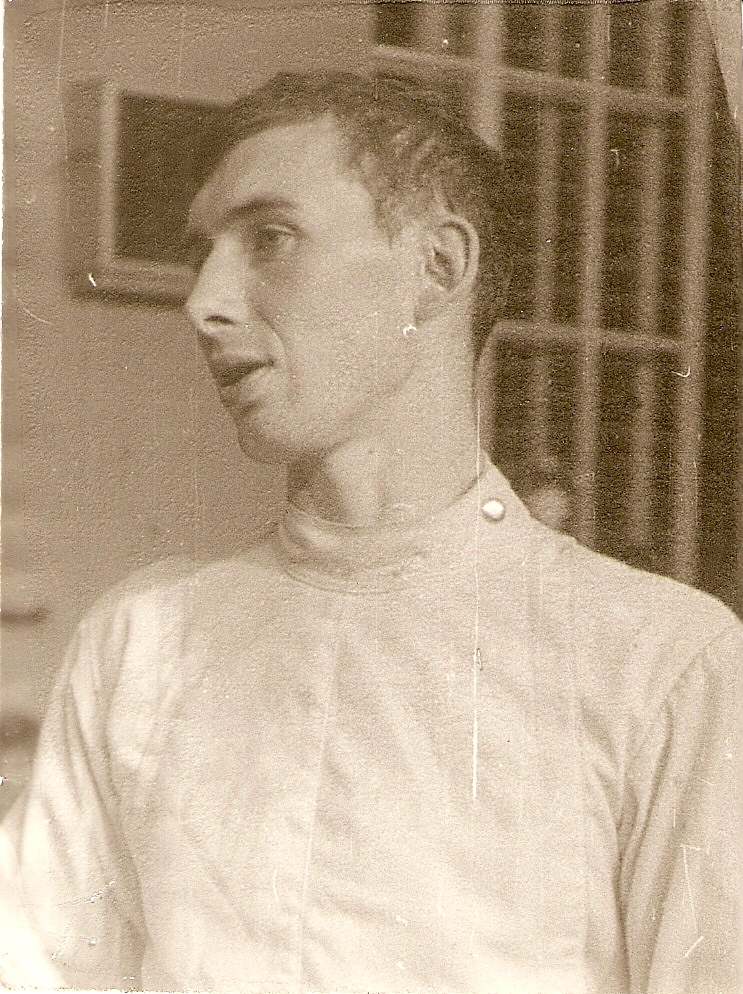
- Aleksey Nikanchikov in 1970

Personal information
- Full name: Aleksey Vladimirovich Nikanchikov
- Born: 30 July 1940 Yagodnoye, Magadan Oblast, RSFSR, Soviet Union
- Died: 29 January 1972 (aged 31) Minsk, Byelorussian SSR, Soviet Union

Sport
- Sport: Fencing
Medal record
Representing Soviet Union
Olympic Games
| Silver medal – second place | 1968 Mexico City | Team épée |
World Championships
| Gold medal – first place | 1966 Moscow | Individual épée |
| Gold medal – first place | 1967 Montreal | Individual épée |
| Gold medal – first place | 1967 Montreal | Team épée |
| Gold medal – first place | 1969 Havana | Team épée |
| Gold medal – first place | 1970 Ankara | Individual épée |
| Silver medal – second place | 1966 Moscow | Team épée |
| Silver medal – second place | 1969 Havana | Individual épée |
| Silver medal – second place | 1971 Vienna | Team épée |
| Bronze medal – third place | 1962 Buenos Aires | Team épée |
| Bronze medal – third place | 1965 Paris | Individual épée |
Summer Universiade
| Silver medal – second place | 1965 Budapest | Team épée |
| Bronze medal – third place | 1965 Budapest | Individual épée |

Aleksey Vladimirovich Nikanchikov (Russian: Алексей Владимирович Никанчиков; 30 July 1940 – 29 January 1972) was a Soviet fencer. He won a silver medal in the team épée event at the 1968 Summer Olympics.
