= Ernesto Fernández =

Mexican fencer (born 1949)

Personal information
- Born: 9 March 1949 (age 77) León, Guanajuato, Mexico

Sport
- Sport: Fencing

Ernesto Fernández (born 9 March 1949) is a Mexican fencer. He competed in the individual and team épée events at the 1968 Summer Olympics.

== See also ==
- List of NCAA fencing champions
