= Max Geuter =

German fencer (1937–2018)

Personal information
- Born: 16 September 1937 Aachen, Nazi Germany
- Died: 27 August 2018 (aged 81)

Sport
- Sport: Fencing

Max Geuter (16 September 1937 – 27 August 2018) was a German fencer. He represented the United Team of Germany in 1964 and West Germany in 1968 and 1972 in the team épée events.
