= Klaus Dumke =

German fencer

Personal information
- Born: 14 February 1941 (age 85) Berlin, Germany

Sport
- Sport: Fencing

Klaus Dumke (born 14 February 1941) is a German fencer. He competed for East Germany in the individual and team épée events at the 1968 Summer Olympics.
