= Michel Constandt =

Belgian fencer

Personal information
- Born: 17 November 1938 (age 87) Ixelles, Belgium

Sport
- Sport: Fencing

Michel Constandt (born 17 November 1938) is a Belgian fencer. He competed in the individual foil and épée events at the 1968 Summer Olympics.
