= Denys Chamay =

Swiss fencer

Personal information
- Born: 12 December 1941 Geneva, Switzerland
- Died: 23 September 2013 (aged 71) Geneva, Switzerland

Sport
- Sport: Fencing
Medal record
Representing Switzerland
Summer Universiade
Gold medal – first place	1967 Tokyo	Individual épée
Gold medal – first place	1967 Tokyo	Team épée
Silver medal – second place	1961 Sofia	Team épée

Denys Chamay (12 December 1941 – 23 September 2013) was a Swiss fencer. He competed in the team épée event at the 1968 Summer Olympics.
