= Manuel González (fencer) =

Cuban fencer

Personal information
- Born: 28 January 1950 (age 76) Havana, Cuba

Sport
- Sport: Fencing

Manuel González (born 28 January 1950) is a Cuban fencer. He competed in the individual and team épée events at the 1968 Summer Olympics.
