= Jean-Pierre Allemand =

French fencer

Personal information
- Born: 4 April 1942 (age 84) Plouguerneau, France

Sport
- Sport: Fencing

Jean-Pierre Allemand (born 4 April 1942) is a French épée fencer. He competed at the 1968 and 1972 Summer Olympics.
