= Gustavo Oliveros =

Cuban fencer (born 1946)

Personal information
- Born: 18 June 1946 (age 80) Havana, Cuba

Sport
- Sport: Fencing

Gustavo Oliveros (born 18 June 1946) is a Cuban fencer. He competed in the individual and team épée events at the 1968 Summer Olympics.
