= Gianfranco Paolucci =

Italian fencer (born 1934)

Personal information
- Born: 18 February 1934 (age 92) Pesaro, Italy

Sport
- Sport: Fencing
Medal record
Men's fencing
Representing Italy
Olympic Games
Silver medal – second place	1964 Tokyo	Team épée
Mediterranean Games
Silver medal – second place	1967 Tunis	Individual épée

Gianfranco Paolucci (born 18 February 1934) is an Italian fencer. He won silver medals in the team épée event at the 1964 Summer Olympics and the individual épée event at the 1967 Mediterranean Games.
