= Ulrich Sloma =

German field hockey player

Personal information
- Nationality: German
- Born: 7 November 1942 (age 83) Münster, Germany

Sport
- Sport: Field hockey

Ulrich Sloma (born 7 November 1942) is a German field hockey player. He competed in the men's tournament at the 1968 Summer Olympics.
