= Harry Fiedler =

German fencer

Personal information
- Born: 30 July 1941 (age 84) Breslau, Germany

Sport
- Sport: Fencing

Harry Fiedler (born 30 July 1941) is a German former fencer. He competed for East Germany at the 1968 and 1972 Summer Olympics.
