= Nick Halsted =

British fencer (1942–2007)

Personal information
- Full name: Nicholas Halsted
- Born: 14 October 1942 Watford, Hertfordshire, England
- Died: 22 September 2007 (aged 64) London, England

Sport
- Sport: Fencing
- Event(s): Foil and epee

Nicholas Halsted (14 October 1942 – 22 September 2007) was a British international fencer. Halsted was captain of the Oxford University fencing team in 1964. He competed in three events at the 1968 Summer Olympics. He was also the President of the Amateur Fencing Association between 1986 and 1994.

He married fellow fencing international Clare Henley in 1972 and their son Laurence Halsted (born 1984) became an Olympic fencer.
