= Hans-Peter Schulze =

German fencer

Personal information
- Born: 21 October 1939 (age 86) Leipzig, Germany

Sport
- Sport: Fencing

Hans-Peter Schulze (born 21 October 1939) is a German fencer. He competed for East Germany in the individual and team épée events at the 1968 and 1972 Summer Olympics.
