= Viktor Modzolevsky =

Soviet fencer (1943–2011)

Personal information
- Born: 13 April 1943 Aktyubinsk, Kazakh SSR, Soviet Union
- Died: 20 November 2011 (aged 68) Tula Oblast, Russia

Sport
- Sport: Fencing
Medal record
Men's fencing
Representing Soviet Union
Olympic Games
Silver medal – second place	1968 Mexico City	Épée, team
Bronze medal – third place	1972 Munich	Épée, team

Viktor Modzolevsky (Russian: Виктор Игоревич Модзолевский; 13 April 1943 – 20 November 2011) was a Soviet fencer. He won a silver medal in the team épée event at the 1968 Summer Olympics and a bronze in the same event at the 1972 Summer Olympics. He was a coach of the Russian national team in the 1990s.

Modzolevsky died in a road accident on 20 November 2011 in way Tula - Voronezh (Don Highway). He was 68.
