= Zbigniew Skrudlik =

Polish fencer (born 1934)

Personal information
- Born: 12 May 1934 (age 92) Jasło, Poland

Sport
- Sport: Fencing
Medal record
Men's fencing
Representing Poland
Olympic Games
Silver medal – second place	1964 Tokyo	Team foil
Bronze medal – third place	1968 Mexico City	Team foil
World Championships
Silver medal – second place	1965 Paris	Team foil
Bronze medal – third place	1961 Turin	Team foil
Bronze medal – third place	1962 Buenos Aires	Team foil
Bronze medal – third place	1966 Moscow	Team foil
Bronze medal – third place	1967 Montreal	Team foil
Summer Universiade
Gold medal – first place	1963 Porto Alegre	Team foil
Gold medal – first place	1963 Porto Alegre	Team épée
Silver medal – second place	1963 Porto Alegre	Individual foil
Bronze medal – third place	1961 Sofia	Team foil

Zbigniew Andrzej Skrudlik (born 12 May 1934) is a Polish fencer. He won a silver medal in the team foil event at the 1964 Summer Olympics and a bronze in the same event at the 1968 Summer Olympics.
