= Fencing at the 1965 Summer Universiade =

Fencing events were contested at the 1965 Summer Universiade in Budapest, Hungary.

== Medal overview ==
=== Men's events ===
| Event | Gold | Silver | Bronze |
|---|---|---|---|
| Individual foil | Jenő Kamuti (HUN) | Viktor Putyatin (URS) | Daniel Revenu (FRA) |
| Team foil | Romania (ROM) | France (FRA) | Soviet Union (URS) |
| Individual épée | Zoltán Nemere (HUN) | Bruno Khabarov (URS) | Aleksei Nikanchikov (URS) |
| Team épée | Hungary (HUN) | Soviet Union (URS) | Poland (POL) |
| Individual sabre | Miklós Meszéna (HUN) | Peter Bakonyi (HUN) | Attila Kovács (HUN) |
| Team sabre | Hungary (HUN) | Soviet Union (URS) | Romania (ROM) |

=== Women's events ===
| Event | Gold | Silver | Bronze |
|---|---|---|---|
| Individual foil | Brigitte Gapais (FRA) | Elżbieta Cymerman (POL) | Heidi Schmidt (FRG) |
| Team foil | Hungary (HUN) | Romania (ROM) | France (FRA) |

== Medal table ==
| Rank | Nation | Gold | Silver | Bronze | Total |
|---|---|---|---|---|---|
| 1 | Hungary (HUN) | 6 | 1 | 1 | 8 |
| 2 | France (FRA) | 1 | 1 | 2 | 4 |
| 3 | Romania (ROM) | 1 | 1 | 1 | 3 |
| 4 | Soviet Union (URS) | 0 | 4 | 2 | 6 |
| 5 | Poland (POL) | 0 | 1 | 1 | 2 |
| 6 | West Germany (FRG) | 0 | 0 | 1 | 1 |
| Totals (6 entries) | | 8 | 8 | 8 | 24 |
