= Kazimierz Barburski =

Polish fencer (1942–2016)

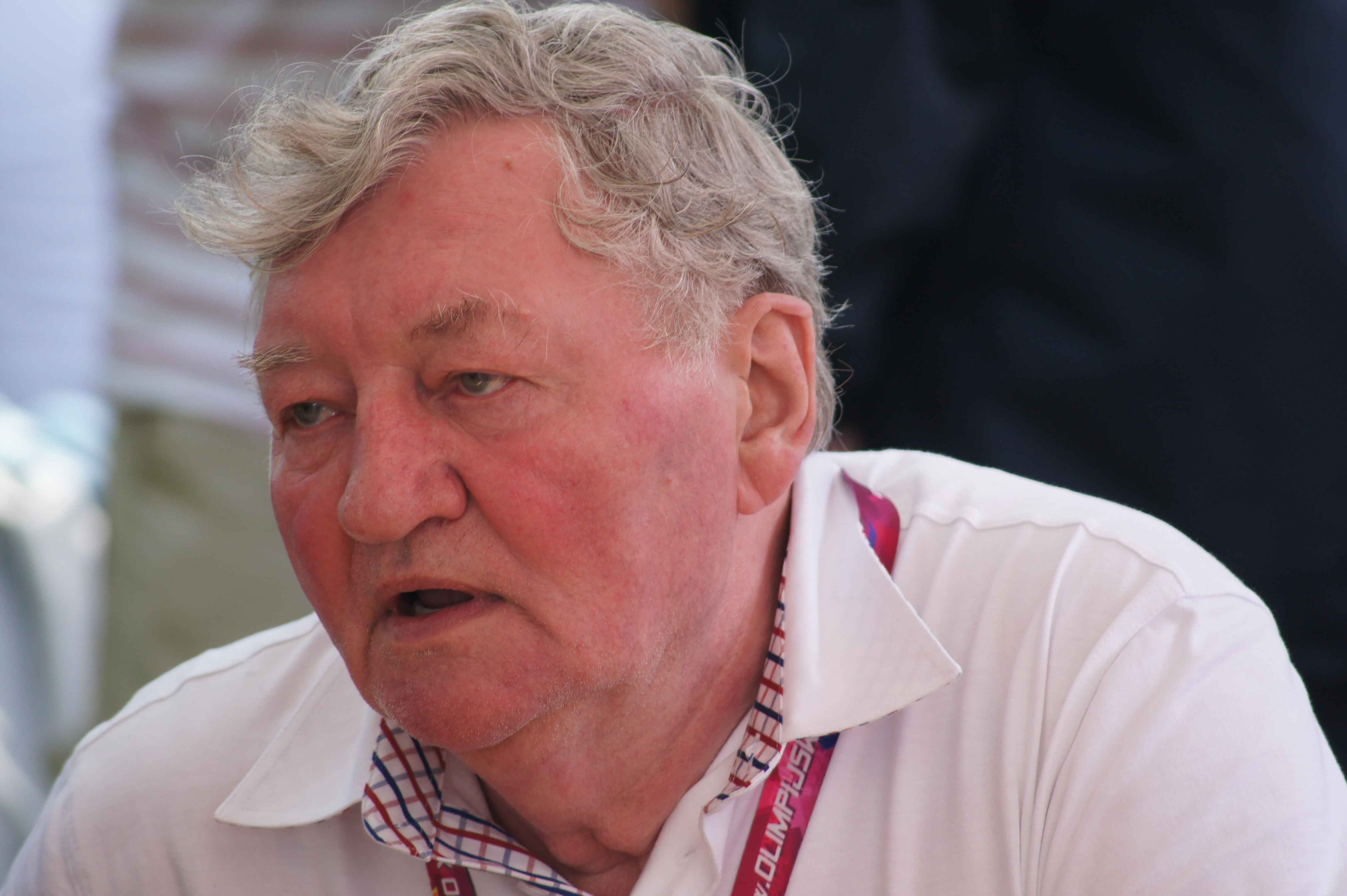
- Kazimierz Barburski in 2011

Personal information
- Born: 7 August 1942 Łódź, Poland
- Died: 26 May 2016 (aged 73) Łódź, Poland

Sport
- Sport: Fencing
Medal record
Men's fencing
Representing Poland
Olympic Games
Bronze medal – third place	1968 Mexico City	Épée, team

Kazimierz Zygfryd Barburski (7 August 1942 – 26 May 2016) was a Polish fencer. He won a bronze medal in the team épée event at the 1968 Summer Olympics.
