= Carlos Couto =

Brazilian fencer (1930–1999)

Personal information
- Born: 10 February 1930 Rio de Janeiro, Brazil
- Died: 20 August 1999 (aged 69) Rio de Janeiro, Brazil

Sport
- Sport: Fencing

Carlos Couto (10 February 1930 – 20 August 1999) was a Brazilian fencer. He competed in the individual and team épée events at the 1968 Summer Olympics. Couto died in Rio de Janeiro on 20 August 1999, at the age of 69.
