= José Antonio Díaz (fencer) =

Cuban fencer

Personal information
- Born: 2 August 1938 (age 87) Havana, Cuba

Sport
- Sport: Fencing

José Antonio Díaz (born 2 August 1938) is a Cuban fencer. He competed in the individual and team épée events at the 1968 Summer Olympics.
