= Magdy Conyd =

Canadian fencer (1939–2023)

Personal information
- Nickname: Magdi
- Nationality: Canadian
- Born: Magdi Mohamed Abdel-Latif Conyd; 22 June 1939 Alexandria, Egypt
- Died: 23 May 2023 (aged 83) Chilliwack, Canada

Sport
- Sport: Fencing
Medal record
Representing Canada
British Commonwealth Games
| Bronze medal – third place | 1970 Edinburgh | foil team |

Magdi Mohamed Abdel-Latif Conyd (22 June 1939 – 23 May 2023) was an Egyptian-Canadian fencer.

Conyd competed at the 1968 and 1972 Summer Olympics. He was Canadian National Foil Champion at least once a decade over 30 years. Conyd died in Chilliwack, Canada on 23 May 2023, at the age of 83.
