= Carlos Calderón (fencer) =

Mexican fencer (born 1947)

Personal information
- Born: 24 January 1947 (age 79) Mexico City, Mexico

Sport
- Sport: Fencing

Carlos Calderón (born 24 January 1947) is a Mexican épée and foil fencer. He competed at the 1968 and 1972 Summer Olympics.
