= Gianluigi Saccaro =

Italian fencer (1938–2021)

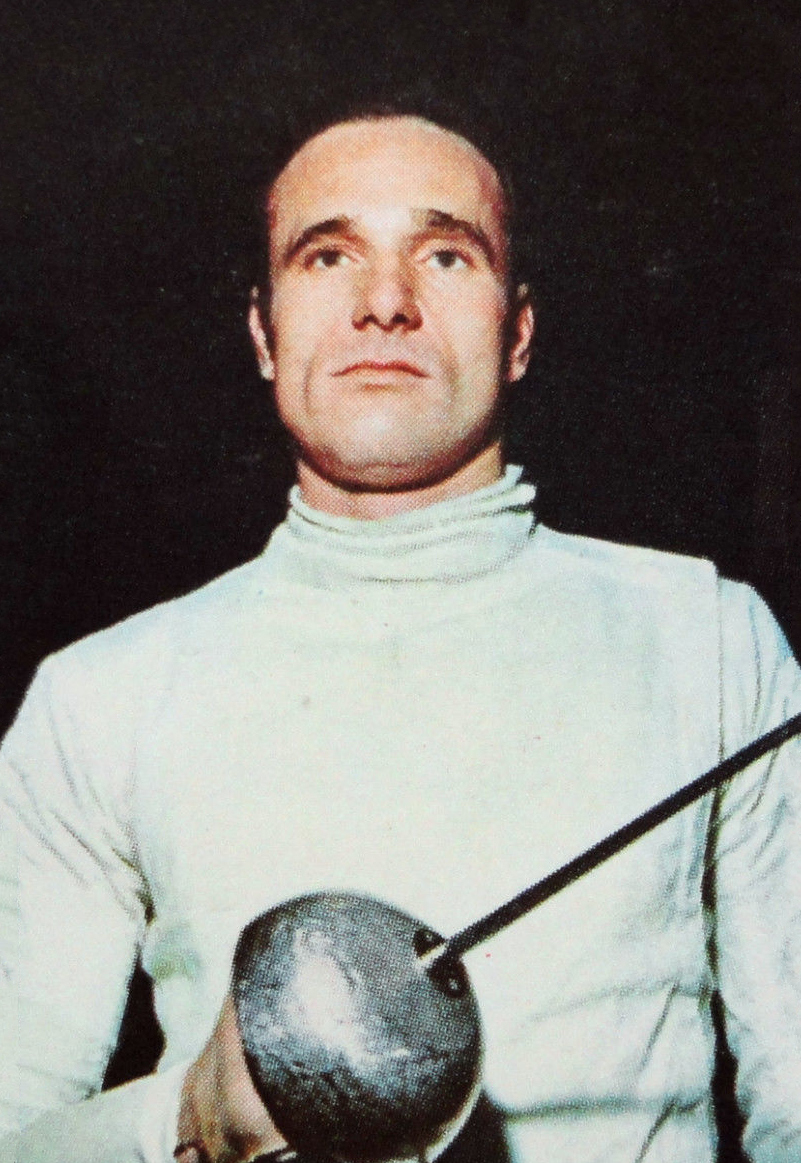
- Saccaro c. 1968

Personal information
- Born: 29 December 1938 Milan, Italy
- Died: 17 February 2021 (aged 82) Rome, Italy
- Height: 1.82 m (6 ft 0 in)
- Weight: 76 kg (168 lb)

Sport
- Sport: Fencing
- Club: SS Cassa di Risparmio, Milan
Medal record
Representing Italy
Olympic Games
Gold medal – first place	1960 Rome	Team épée
Silver medal – second place	1964 Tokyo	Team épée
Bronze medal – third place	1968 Mexico City	Individual épée
World Championships
Gold medal – first place	1957 Paris	Team épée
Gold medal – first place	1958 Philadelphia	Team épée
Summer Universiade
Gold medal – first place	1959 Turin	Team épée
Bronze medal – third place	1963 Porto Alegre	Individual épée
Bronze medal – third place	1963 Porto Alegre	Team épée
Bronze medal – third place	1963 Porto Alegre	Team sabre

Gianluigi Saccaro (29 December 1938 – 17 February 2021) was an Italian fencer. Saccaro won a gold medal at the 1960 Summer Olympics, a silver at the 1964 Games and a bronze at the 1968 Games. He also competed at the 1972 Olympics, both individually and with the Italian team, but failed to reach the finals.
