= Dicki Sörensen =

Swedish fencer

Personal information
- Born: 8 November 1940 (age 85) Uppsala, Sweden

Sport
- Sport: Fencing

Dicki Sörensen (born 8 November 1940) is a Swedish fencer. He competed in the individual and team épée events at the 1968 Summer Olympics.
