= Peter Lötscher =

Swiss fencer

Personal information
- Born: 4 February 1941 Basel, Switzerland
- Died: 24 October 2017 (aged 76)

Sport
- Sport: Fencing
Medal record
Men's fencing
Representing Switzerland
Olympic Games
Silver medal – second place	1972 Munich	Épée, team

Peter Lötscher (4 February 1941 – 24 October 2017) was a Swiss fencer. He won a silver medal in the team épée event at the 1972 Summer Olympics.
