= Franz Rompza =

German fencer

Personal information
- Born: 12 February 1934 (age 92) Seehof, Nazi Germany

Sport
- Sport: Fencing

Franz Rompza (born 12 February 1934) is a German fencer. He represented the United Team of Germany at the 1964 Summer Olympics and West Germany at the 1968 Summer Olympics.
