= Orvar Lindwall =

Swedish fencer (1941–2025)

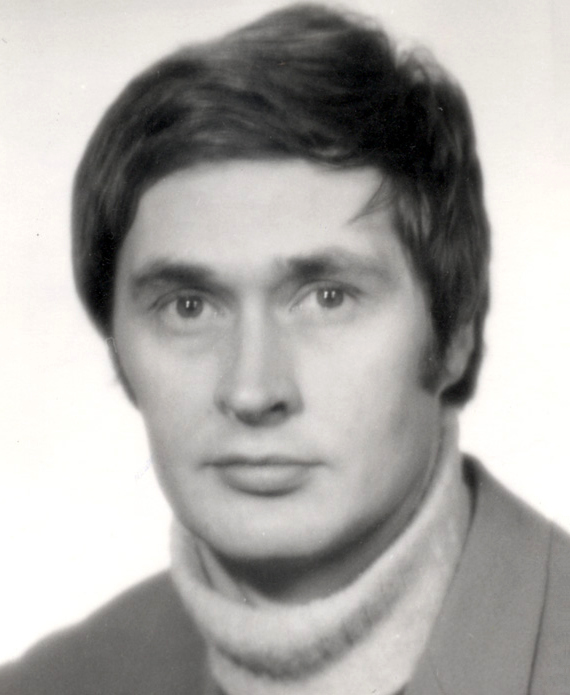

Personal information
- Born: 10 August 1941 Lund, Sweden
- Died: 6 October 2025 (aged 84)
- Height: 192 cm (6 ft 4 in)
- Weight: 70 kg (154 lb)

Sport
- Sport: Fencing
- Event(s): Épée, foil
- Club: Djurgårdens IF; Stockholms AF
Medal record
Representing Sweden
World Championships
| Bronze medal – third place | 1961 Turin | Épée, team |
| Silver medal – second place | 1962 Buenos Aires | Épée, team |

Lars Orvar Martin Lindwall (also Orwar; 10 August 1941 – 6 October 2025) was a Swedish épée fencer who won two team medals at the 1961 and 1962 Fencing World Championships. He competed at the 1960, 1964 and 1968 Summer Olympics and finished fifth with the Swedish team in 1960 and fourth in 1964. His best individual result was seventh place in 1964. Lindwall later attended the 1972–1984 and 1992 Olympics as a coach of the Swedish fencing team.

Lindwall represented Östra Reals IF, Djurgårdens IF, Stockholms AFF and Föreningen för Fäktkonstens Främjande. He won the 1963 Swedish championship in individual épée, representing Djurgården, two Swedish championships in individual foil, representing Östra Real and Stockholms AFF, two Swedish championships in team épée with FFF, and four Swedish championships with Stockholms AFF and FFF. He died on 6 October 2025, at the age of 84.
