= Dieter Jung (fencer) =

German fencer

Personal information
- Born: 10 October 1940 (age 85) Würzburg, Nazi Germany

Sport
- Sport: Fencing

Dieter Jung (born 10 October 1940) is a German former fencer. He competed at the 1968 and 1972 Summer Olympics.
