= Michel Steininger =

Swiss fencer (born 1935)

Personal information
- Born: 5 February 1935 Lausanne, Switzerland
- Died: 6 December 2024 (aged 89)

Sport
- Sport: Fencing
Medal record
Representing Switzerland
Summer Universiade
Silver medal – second place	1959 Turin	Individual épée
Silver medal – second place	1963 Porto Alegre	Individual épée

Michel Steininger (5 February 1935 – 6 December 2024) was a Swiss fencer. He competed at the 1960, 1964 and 1968 Summer Olympics.
