= Bohdan Andrzejewski =

Polish fencer (born 1942)

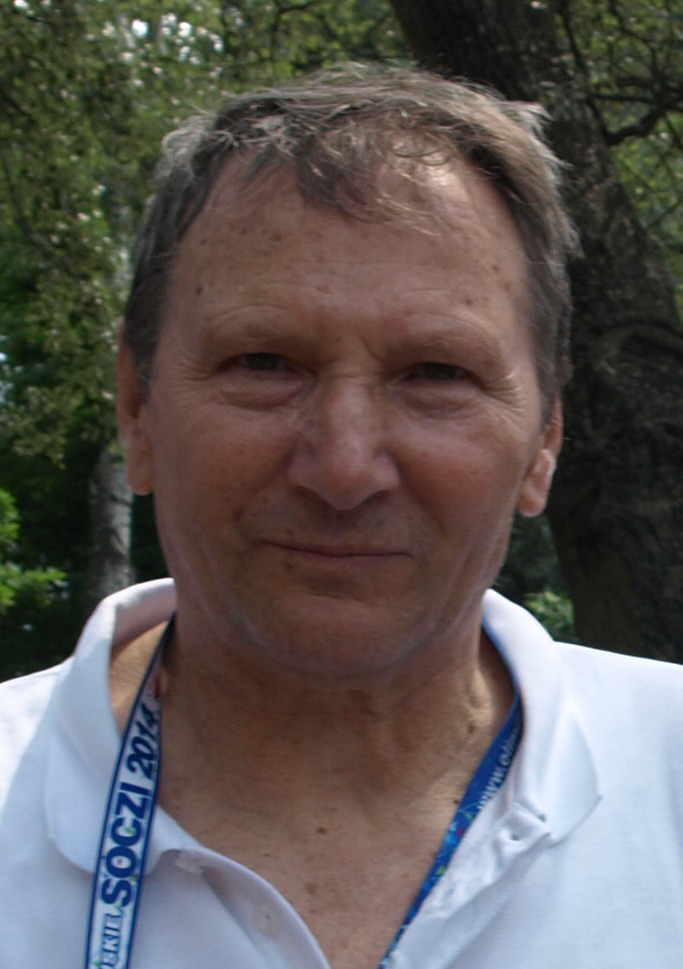
- Bohdan Andrzejewski (2013)

Personal information
- Born: 15 January 1942 (age 84) Kielce, Poland

Sport
- Sport: Fencing
Medal record
Men's fencing
Representing Poland
Olympic Games
Bronze medal – third place	1968 Mexico City	Épée, team

Bohdan Andrzejewski (born 15 January 1942) is a Polish fencer. He won a bronze medal in the team épée event at the 1968 Summer Olympics.

He was a world champion in épée at the Senior World Championships in Havana, Cuba in 1969.
