= Francisco da Silva (fencer) =

Portuguese fencer

Personal information
- Born: 7 May 1945 (age 81) Lisbon, Portugal

Sport
- Sport: Fencing

Francisco da Silva (born 7 May 1945) is a Portuguese fencer. He competed in the individual and team épée events at the 1968 Summer Olympics.
