= Henryk Nielaba =

Polish fencer (born 1933)

Personal information
- Born: 5 September 1933 (age 93) Katowice, Poland

Sport
- Sport: Fencing
Medal record
Men's fencing
Representing Poland
Olympic Games
Bronze medal – third place	1968 Mexico City	Épée, team

Henryk Nielaba (born 5 September 1933) is a Polish fencer. He won a bronze medal in the team épée event at the 1968 Summer Olympics.
