= José Pinheiro (fencer) =

Portuguese fencer

Personal information
- Born: 20 August 1938 (age 87) Lisbon, Portugal

Sport
- Sport: Fencing

José Pinheiro (born 20 August 1938) is a Portuguese fencer. He competed in the individual and team épée events at the 1968 Summer Olympics.
