= Alexandre Bretholz =

Swiss fencer

Personal information
- Born: 9 June 1944 (age 82) Moudon, Switzerland

Sport
- Sport: Fencing

Alexandre Bretholz (born 9 June 1944) is a Swiss fencer. He competed in the individual and team épée events at the 1968 Summer Olympics.
