= Fencing at the 1963 Summer Universiade =

Fencing events were contested at the 1963 Summer Universiade in Porto Alegre, Brazil.

== Medal overview ==
=== Men's events ===
Event	Gold	Silver	Bronze
Individual foil	Jenő Kamuti (HUN)	Zbigniew Skrudlik (POL)	Daniel Revenu (FRA)
Team foil	Poland (POL)	Hungary (HUN)	Soviet Union (URS)
Individual épée	Peter Jacobs (GBR)	Michel Steininger (SUI)	Gianluigi Saccaro (ITA)
Team épée	Poland (POL)	Hungary (HUN)	Italy (ITA)
Individual sabre	Tibor Pézsa (HUN)	Peter Bakonyi (HUN)	Boris Melnikov (URS)
Team sabre	Hungary (HUN)	Soviet Union (URS)	Italy (ITA)

=== Women's events ===
Event	Gold	Silver	Bronze
Individual foil	Lídia Sákovicsné Dömölky (HUN)	Annick Level (FRA)	Judit Ágoston-Mendelényi (HUN)
Team foil	France (FRA)	Hungary (HUN)	West Germany (FRG)

== Medal table ==
Rank	Nation	Gold	Silver	Bronze	Total
1	Hungary (HUN)	4	4	1	9
2	Poland (POL)	2	1	0	3
3	France (FRA)	1	1	1	3
4	Great Britain (GBR)	1	0	0	1
5	Soviet Union (URS)	0	1	2	3
6	Switzerland (SUI)	0	1	0	1
7	Italy (ITA)	0	0	3	3
8	West Germany (FRG)	0	0	1	1
Totals (8 entries)		8	8	8	24
