= Lars-Erik Larsson (fencer) =

Swedish fencer

Personal information
- Born: 3 December 1944 (age 81) Stockholm, Sweden

Sport
- Sport: Fencing

Lars-Erik Larsson (born 3 December 1944) is a Swedish fencer. He competed in the individual and team épée events at the 1968 Summer Olympics.
