= Netherlands at the 1964 Summer Olympics =

- Flag of the Netherlands
- IOC code: NED (NLD used at these Games)
- NOC: Dutch Olympic Committee

in Tokyo
- Competitors: 125 (105 men and 20 women) in 12 sports
- Flag bearer: Anton Geesink
- Medals Ranked 15th: Gold 2 Silver 4 Bronze 4 Total 10

Summer Olympics appearances (overview)
- 1900; 1904; 1908; 1912; 1920; 1924; 1928; 1932; 1936; 1948; 1952; 1956; 1960; 1964; 1968; 1972; 1976; 1980; 1984; 1988; 1992; 1996; 2000; 2004; 2008; 2012; 2016; 2020; 2024; 2028

Other related appearances
- 1906 Intercalated Games

The Netherlands competed at the 1964 Summer Olympics in Tokyo, Japan. 125 competitors, 105 men and 20 women, took part in 57 events in 12 sports. Simon de Wit, who had represented his country in rowing at the 1936 Summer Olympics, was the Netherlands' Chef de Mission.

== Medalists ==
=== Gold ===
- Anton Geesink — Judo, Men's Open Class
- Bart Zoet, Jan Pieterse, Evert Dolman, and Gerben Karstens — Cycling Road, Men's Team Road Race

=== Silver ===
- Anton Geurts and Paul Hoekstra — Canoeing, Men's K2 1,000m Kayak Pairs
- Steven Blaisse, and Ernst Veenemans — Rowing, Men's Coxless Pairs
- Ada Kok — Swimming, Women's 100m Butterfly
- Corrie Winkel, Klenie Bimolt, Ada Kok, and Erica Terpstra — Swimming, Women's 4 × 100 m Medley Relay

=== Bronze ===
- Cor Schuuring, Henk Cornelisse, Gerard Koel, and Jaap Oudkerk — Cycling Road, Men's 4,000m Team Pursuit
- Jan Justus Bos, Erik Hartsuiker and Herman Rouwé — Rowing, Men's Coxed Pairs
- Jan van de Graaff, Robert van de Graaf, Marius Klumperbeek, Lex Mullink and Freek van de Graaff — Rowing, Men's Coxed Fours
- Winnie van Weerdenburg, Erica Terpstra, Pauline van der Wildt, and Toos Beumer — Swimming, Women's 4 × 100 m Freestyle Relay

== Athletics ==
Men's competition

- Eef Kamerbeek
- Kees Koch
- Frans Luitjes

Women's competition

- Joke Bijleveld
- Jannie van Eyck-Vos
- Lia Hinten
- Gerda Kraan
- Tilly van der Made

== Cycling ==
Twelve cyclists represented the Netherlands in 1964.

Individual road race

- Bart Zoet
- Gerben Karstens
- Harry Steevens
- Jan Pieterse

Team time trial

- Evert Dolman
- Gerben Karstens
- Jan Pieterse
- Bart Zoet

Sprint

- Piet van der Touw
- Aad de Graaf

1000m time trial

- Piet van der Touw

Tandem

- Aad de Graaf
- Piet van der Touw

Individual pursuit

- Tiemen Groen

Team pursuit

- Gerard Koel
- Henk Cornelisse
- Jaap Oudkerk
- Cor Schuuring

== Shooting ==
One shooter represented the Netherlands in 1964.

50 m rifle, three positions

- Joop van Domselaar

50 m rifle, prone

- Joop van Domselaar

== Swimming ==
Men

Athlete	Event	Heat		Semifinal		Final	
Athlete	Event	Time	Rank	Time	Rank	Time	Rank
Vinus van Baalen	100 m freestyle	56.8	=36	Did not advance			
Ron Kroon	100 m freestyle	55.5	=11 Q	55.7	=15	Did not advance	
Bert Sitters	100 m freestyle	58.1	50	Did not advance			
Johan Bontekoe	400 m freestyle	4:26.6	14	—N/a		Did not advance	
Aad Oudt	400 m freestyle	4:46.5	44	—N/a		Did not advance	
Henri van Osch	200 m backstroke	2:19.1	15 Q	2:19.7	14	Did not advance	
Jan Weeteling	200 m backstroke	2:20.4	19	Did not advance			
Wieger Mensonides	200 m breaststroke	2:47.4	28	Did not advance			
Hemmie Vriens	200 m breaststroke	2:40.8	20	Did not advance			
Dick Langerhorst	200 m butterfly	2:22.5	26	Did not advance			
Jan Jiskoot	400 m individual medley	5:04.4	8 Q	—N/a		5:01.9	6
Ron Kroon; Vinus van Baalen; Jan Jiskoot; Johan Bontekoe	4 × 100 m freestyle relay	3:43.8	10	—N/a		Did not advance	
Johan Bontekoe; Jan Jiskoot; Ron Kroon; Bert Sitters	4 × 200 m freestyle relay	8:27.7	12	—N/a		Did not advance	
Jan Weeteling; Hemmie Vriens; Jan Jiskoot; Ron Kroon	4 × 100 m medley relay	4:12.6	9	—N/a		Did not advance	

Women

Athlete	Event	Heat		Semifinal		Final	
Athlete	Event	Time	Rank	Time	Rank	Time	Rank
Toos Beumer	100 m freestyle	1:05.2	29	Did not advance			
Erica Terpstra	100 m freestyle	1:02.5	=6 Q	1:02.3	=4 Q	1:01.8	4
Winnie van Weerdenburg	100 m freestyle	1:03.8	18 Q	Did not advance			
Ineke Tigelaar	400 m freestyle	5:01.8	16	—N/a		Did not advance	
Bep Weeteling	400 m freestyle	5:13.0	28	—N/a		Did not advance	
Ria van Velsen	100 m backstroke	1:12.2	=19	—N/a		Did not advance	
Bep Weeteling	100 m backstroke	1:13.1	24	—N/a		Did not advance	
Corrie Winkel	100 m backstroke	1:11.6	14	—N/a		Did not advance	
Klenie Bimolt	200 m breaststroke	2:50.7	8 Q	—N/a		2:51.3	7
Gretta Kok	200 m breaststroke	2:55.4	15	—N/a		Did not advance	
Truus Looijs	200 m breaststroke	2:54.5	12	—N/a		Did not advance	
Ada Kok	100 m butterfly	1:07.8	=3 Q	1:05.9	2 Q	1:05.6	2nd place, silver medalist(s)
Adrie Lasterie	100 m butterfly	1:11.2	=18	Did not advance			
Marianne Heemskerk	400 m individual medley	5:38.6	10	—N/a		Did not advance	
Betty Heukels	400 m individual medley	5:32.4	5 Q	—N/a		5:30.3	6
Adrie Lasterie	400 m individual medley	5:41.3	12	—N/a		Did not advance	
Pauline van der Wildt; Toos Beumer; Winnie van Weerdenburg; Erica Terpstra	4 × 100 m freestyle relay	4:14.8	5 Q	—N/a		4:12.0	3rd place, bronze medalist(s)
Corrie Winkel; Klenie Bimolt; Ada Kok; Erica Terpstra; Adrie Lasterie	4 × 100 m medley relay	4:44.1	5 Q	—N/a		4:37.0	2nd place, silver medalist(s)

== Volleyball ==
Men's Team Competition

- Round Robin

- Lost to United States (0-3)
- Lost to Soviet Union (0-3)
- Defeated Brazil (3-2)
- Lost to Romania (0-3)
- Lost to Bulgaria (2-3)
- Defeated South Korea (3-1)
- Lost to Hungary (3-1)
- Lost to Czechoslovakia (3-1)
- Lost to Japan (2-3) → 8th place

- Team Roster

- Frank Constandse
- Jacques Ewalds
- Ron Groenhuyzen
- Johannes van der Hoek
- Jurjaan Koolen
- Jaap Korsloot
- Jan Oosterbaan
- Dinco van der Stoep
- Piet Swieter
- Joop Tinkhof
- Jacques de Vink
- Hans van Wijnen

== Water polo ==
Men's Team Competition

- Preliminary Round (Group C)

- Defeated Brazil (3-2)
- Lost to Yugoslavia (2-7)
- Defeated United States (6-4)

- Semi Final Round (Group C/D)

- Defeated Belgium (7-5)
- Lost to Hungary (5-6)

- Classification Round (5th-8th place)

- Lost to Germany (4-5)
- Lost to Romania (1-6) → 8th place

- Team Roster

- Jan Bultman
- Fred van Dorp
- Henk Hermsen
- Ben Kniest
- Bram Leenards
- Hans Muller
- Wim van Spingelen
- Nico van der Voet
- Harry Vriend
- Wim Vriend
- Gerrit Wormgoor
