= Cycling at the 1964 Summer Olympics =

Cycling at the Games of the XVIII Olympiad
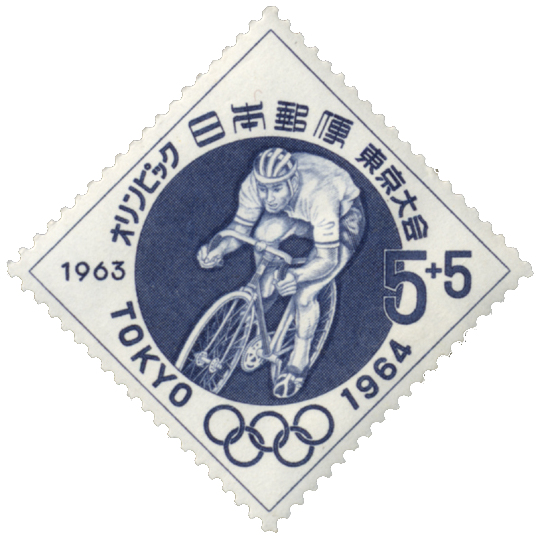
- Cycling at the 1964 Olympics on a stamp of Japan
- Venues: Hachiōji City; Hachioji Velodrome
- Date: 14 –20 October 1964
- Competitors: 303 from 40 nations

The cycling competition at the 1964 Summer Olympics consisted of two road cycling events and five track cycling events, all for men only. The 4000m individual pursuit event was introduced at these Games.

== Medal summary ==
=== Road cycling ===
Event	Gold	Silver	Bronze
Individual road race	Mario Zanin; Italy	Kjeld Rodian; Denmark	Walter Godefroot; Belgium
Team time trial	Netherlands; Bart Zoet; Evert Dolman; Gerben Karstens; Jan Pieterse	Italy; Ferruccio Manza; Severino Andreoli; Luciano Dalla Bona; Pietro Guerra	Sweden; Sture Pettersson; Sven Hamrin; Erik Pettersson; Gösta Pettersson

=== Track cycling ===
Games	Gold	Silver	Bronze
Individual pursuit	Jiří Daler; Czechoslovakia	Giorgio Ursi; Italy	Preben Isaksson; Denmark
Team pursuit	United Team of Germany; Ernst Streng; Lothar Claesges; Karlheinz Henrichs; Karl Link	Italy; Franco Testa; Cencio Mantovani; Carlo Rancati; Luigi Roncaglia	Netherlands; Cor Schuuring; Henk Cornelisse; Gerard Koel; Jaap Oudkerk
Sprint	Giovanni Pettenella; Italy	Sergio Bianchetto; Italy	Daniel Morelon; France
Tandem	Angelo Damiano and Sergio Bianchetto; Italy	Imants Bodnieks and Viktor Logunov; Soviet Union	Willi Fuggerer and Klaus Kobusch; United Team of Germany
Time trial	Patrick Sercu; Belgium	Giovanni Pettenella; Italy	Pierre Trentin; France

== Participating nations ==
303 cyclists from 40 nations competed.

- Argentina (10)
- Australia (14)
- Belgium (10)
- Bulgaria (1)
- Cambodia (6)
- Colombia (8)
- Czechoslovakia (9)
- Denmark (12)
- Ethiopia (4)
- France (14)

- United Team of Germany (13)
- Great Britain (12)
- Hong Kong (4)
- Hungary (7)
- India (5)
- Iran (4)
- Italy (14)
- Japan (15)
- Luxembourg (2)
- Malaysia (9)

- Mexico (9)
- Mongolia (4)
- Netherlands (12)
- New Zealand (5)
- Pakistan (4)
- Peru (1)
- Philippines (4)
- Poland (8)
- Taiwan (4)
- Romania (5)

- South Korea (6)
- Soviet Union (12)
- Spain (6)
- Sweden (4)
- Switzerland (5)
- Thailand (8)
- Trinidad and Tobago (3)
- United States (16)
- Uruguay (8)
- Vietnam (6)

== Medal table ==
Rank	Nation	Gold	Silver	Bronze	Total
1	Italy	3	5	0	8
2	Belgium	1	0	1	2
2	Netherlands	1	0	1	2
2	United Team of Germany	1	0	1	2
5	Czechoslovakia	1	0	0	1
6	Denmark	0	1	1	2
7	Soviet Union	0	1	0	1
8	France	0	0	2	2
9	Sweden	0	0	1	1
Totals (9 entries)		7	7	7	21
