= Denmark at the 1964 Summer Olympics =

- IOC code: DEN
- NOC: Danish Olympic Committee

in Tokyo
- Competitors: 60 (53 men, 7 women) in 10 sports
- Flag bearer: Henning Wind
- Medals Ranked 18th: Gold 2 Silver 1 Bronze 3 Total 6

Summer Olympics appearances (overview)
- 1896; 1900; 1904; 1908; 1912; 1920; 1924; 1928; 1932; 1936; 1948; 1952; 1956; 1960; 1964; 1968; 1972; 1976; 1980; 1984; 1988; 1992; 1996; 2000; 2004; 2008; 2012; 2016; 2020; 2024

Other related appearances
- 1906 Intercalated Games

Denmark competed at the 1964 Summer Olympics in Tokyo, Japan. 60 competitors, 53 men and 7 women, took part in 40 events in 10 sports.

== Medalists ==
=== Gold ===
- Ole Berntsen, Christian von Bülow and Ole Poulsen – Sailing, Men's Dragon Class
- John Hansen, Bjørn Hasløv, Erik Petersen and Kurt Helmudt – Rowing, Men's Coxless Fours

=== Silver ===
- Kjell Rodian – Cycling, Men's Individual Road Race

=== Bronze ===
- Henning Wind – Sailing, Men's Finn Class
- Preben Isaksson – Cycling, Men's 4.000m Individual Pursuit
- Peer Nielsen and John Sørensen – Canoeing, Men's C-2 1.000m

== Cycling ==
Twelve cyclists represented Denmark in 1964.

Individual road race

- Kjell Rodian
- Ole Højlund Pedersen
- Flemming Gleerup Hansen
- Ole Ritter

Team time trial

- Flemming Gleerup Hansen
- Henning Petersen
- Ole Højlund Pedersen
- Ole Ritter

Sprint

- Niels Fredborg
- Peder Pedersen

1000m time trial

- Jan Ingstrup-Mikkelsen

Tandem

- Niels Fredborg
- Per Sarto Jørgensen

Individual pursuit

- Preben Isaksson

Team pursuit

- Bent Hansen
- Preben Isaksson
- Jan Ingstrup-Mikkelsen
- Kurt vid Stein

== Diving ==
Men

Athlete	Event	Preliminary		Final			
Athlete	Event	Points	Rank	Points	Rank	Total	Rank
Søren Svejstrup	10 m platform	85.36	20	Did not advance			

Women

Athlete	Event	Preliminary		Final			
Athlete	Event	Points	Rank	Points	Rank	Total	Rank
Kirsten Velin	10 m platform	43.85	17	Did not advance			

== Sailing ==
Open

Athlete	Event	Race							Net points	Final rank
Athlete	Event	1	2	3	4	5	6	7	Net points	Final rank
Henning Wind	Finn	14	~~20~~	3	4	2	1	10	6190	Bronze medal
Hans Fogh; Ole Gunnar Petersen	Flying Dutchman	6	~~DNF~~	4	1	5	13	7	4500	4
Ole Berntsen; Christian von Bülow; Ole Poulsen	Dragon	1	~~16~~	4	10	3	1	7	5854	Gold medal
William Berntsen; Carl Christian Lassen; Per Holm	5.5 Metre	5	7	12	10	8	~~13~~	11	2095	12

== Shooting ==
Two shooters represented Denmark in 1964.

50 m rifle, three positions

- Niels Petersen
- Ole Hviid Jensen

50 m rifle, prone

- Ole Hviid Jensen
- Niels Petersen

== Swimming ==
Men

Athlete	Event	Heat		Semifinal		Final	
Athlete	Event	Time	Rank	Time	Rank	Time	Rank
Lars Kraus Jensen	200 m backstroke	2:23.3	25	Did not advance			

Women

Athlete	Event	Heat		Semifinal		Final	
Athlete	Event	Time	Rank	Time	Rank	Time	Rank
Kirsten Strange	100 m freestyle	1:05.3	30	Did not advance			
Kirsten Michaelsen	100 m backstroke	1:11.2	18	—N/a		Did not advance	
Kirsten Strange	400 m individual medley	5:44.4	16	—N/a		Did not advance	
