= Cycling at the 1964 Summer Olympics – Men's team pursuit =

Men's cycling team pursuit at the Games of the XVIII Olympiad
- Venue: Hachioji Velodrome
- Date: 18–20 October 1964
- Competitors: 72 from 18 nations

Medalists
1st place, gold medalist(s)		Lothar Claesges, Karl Link, Karl-Heinz Henrichs and Ernst Streng	United Team of Germany
2nd place, silver medalist(s)		Luigi Roncaglia, Carlo Rancati, Vincenzo Mantovani and Franco Testa	Italy
3rd place, bronze medalist(s)		Gerard Koel, Jaap Oudkerk, Henk Cornelisse and Cor Schuuring	Netherlands

The men's team pursuit was a track cycling event held as part of the Cycling at the 1964 Summer Olympics programme. The course was 4000 metres. It was held on 19 October and 21 October 1964 at the Hachioji Velodrome. 18 teams of 4 cyclists each competed.

== Medalists ==
Gold	Silver	Bronze
United Team of Germany; Lothar Claesges; Karlheinz Henrichs; Karl Link; Ernst Streng	Italy; Vincenzo Mantovani; Carlo Rancati; Luigi Roncaglia; Franco Testa	Netherlands; Henk Cornelisse; Gerard Koel; Jaap Oudkerk; Cor Schuuring

== Results ==
=== Heats ===
In the first round of heats, the 18 teams were divided into 9 pairs. Placing in the heats was not used to advance; rather, the 8 fastest teams from across the heats advanced to the quarterfinals.

Heat 1
1.	Lothar Claesges, Karl Link, Karl-Heinz Henrichs, and Ernst Streng (EUA)	4:42.28	QQ
2.	Trevor Bull, Hugh Porter, Harry Jackson, and Brian Sandy (GBR)	4:47:67
Heat 2
1.	Luigi Roncaglia, Carlo Rancati, Vincenzo Mantovani, and Franco Testa (ITA)	4:39.06	QQ
2.	Carlos Alberto Álvarez, Juan Alberto Merlos, Ernesto Contreras, and Alberto Trillo (ARG)	4:44.66	QQ
Heat 3
1.	Dzintars Lācis, Stanislav Moskvin, Leonid Kolumbet, and Sergey Tereshchenkov (URS)	4:43.76	QQ
2.	Robert Varga, Joseph Pare, Christian Cuch, and Jacques Suire (FRA)	4:50.62
Heat 4
1.	Bent Hansen, Jan Ingstrup-Mikkelsen, Preben Isaksson, and Kurt vid Stein (DEN)	4:46.97	QQ
2.	Jiri Daller, Jiří Pecka, Antonín Kříž, and Frantisek Rezak (TCH)	4:47.04	QQ
Heat 5
1.	Kevin Brislin, Victor Browne, Robert Baird, and Hendrikus Vogels (AUS)	4:44.90	QQ
2.	Gerard Koel, Jaap Oudkerk, Henk Cornelisse, and Cor Schuuring (NED)	4:45.33	QQ
Heat 6
1.	Hans Wolf, Donald Nelsen, Oliver Martin, and Arnold Uhrlass (USA)	5:01.41
2.	Leopold Heuvelmans, Roland van de Rijse, Roland de Neve, and Albert Van Vlierberghe (BEL)	5:04.25
Heat 7
1.	Preeda Chullamondhol, Smaisuk Krisansuwan, and Somchai Chantarasamrit (THA)	5:31.52
2.	Muhammad Ashiq, Muhammad Hafeez, Lal Bakhsh, and Muhammad Shafi (PAK)	5:38.77
Heat 8
1.	Norio Hotogi, Kosaku Takahashi, Fujio Ito, and Hiromi Yamafuji (JPN)	4:55.04
2.	Amar Singh Billing, Chetan Singh Hari, Dalbir Singh Gill, and Amar Singh Sokhi (IND)	Elim.
Heat 9
1.	Oscar Almada, Elio Juárez, Ruben Etchebarne, and Juan Timon (URU)	DNF
2.	Ng Joo Pong, Arulraj Rosli, Choy Mow Thim, and Kamsari Salam (MAS)	DNF

=== Quarterfinals ===
The quarterfinals paired off the 8 remaining teams into 4 heats. Winners advanced, losers were eliminated.

Quarterfinal 1
1.	Luigi Roncaglia, Carlo Rancati, Vincenzo Mantovani, and Franco Testa (ITA)	4:37.58	QS
2.	Jiri Daller, Jiří Pecka, Antonín Kříž, and Frantisek Rezak (TCH)	4:45.68
Quarterfinal 2
1.	Lothar Claesges, Karl Link, Karl-Heinz Henrichs, and Ernst Streng (EUA)	4:36.98	QS
2.	Bent Hansen, Jan Ingstrup-Mikkelsen, Preben Isaksson, and Kurt vid Stein (DEN)	4:43.58
Quarterfinal 3
1.	Gerard Koel, Jaap Oudkerk, Henk Cornelisse, and Cor Schuuring (NED)	4:40.41	QS
2.	Dzintars Lācis, Stanislav Moskvin, Leonid Kolumbet, and Sergey Tereshchenkov (URS)	4:41.70
Quarterfinal 4
1.	Kevin Brislin, Victor Browne, Robert Baird, and Hendrikus Vogels (AUS)	4:41.58	QS
2.	Carlos Alvarez, Juan Merlos, Ernesto Contreras, and Alberto Trillo (ARG)	4:45.74

=== Semifinals ===
The winner of each semifinal advanced to the gold medal match, while the loser was sent to the bronze medal match.

Semifinal 1
1.	Lothar Claesges, Karl Link, Karl-Heinz Henrichs, and Ernst Streng (EUA)	4:38.19	QG
2.	Kevin Brislin, Victor Browne, Robert Baird, and Hendrikus Vogels (AUS)	4:40.28	QB
Semifinal 2
1.	Luigi Roncaglia, Carlo Rancati, Vincenzo Mantovani, and Franco Testa (ITA)	4:37.98	QG
2.	Gerard Koel, Jaap Oudkerk, Henk Cornelisse, and Cor Schuuring (NED)	4:41.02	QB

=== Finals ===
Gold Medal Match
	Lothar Claesges, Karl Link, Karl-Heinz Henrichs, and Ernst Streng (EUA)	4:35.67
	Luigi Roncaglia, Carlo Rancati, Vincenzo Mantovani, and Franco Testa (ITA)	4:35.74
Bronze Medal Match
	Gerard Koel, Jaap Oudkerk, Henk Cornelisse, and Cor Schuuring (NED)	4:38.99
4.	Kevin Brislin, Victor Browne, Robert Baird, and Hendrikus Vogels (AUS)	4:39.42

== Sources ==
- Tokyo Organizing Committee (1964). The Games of the XVIII Olympiad: Tokyo 1964, vol. 2.
