= 1964 UCI Track Cycling World Championships =

Cycling or Biking championship

- Venue: Paris, France
- Date: 8–13 September 1964
- Velodrome: Parc des Princes
- Events: 9

The 1964 UCI Track Cycling World Championships were the World Championship for track cycling. They took place in Paris, France from 8 to 13 September 1964. Nine events were contested, 7 for men (3 for professionals, 4 for amateurs) and 2 for women.

In the same period, the 1964 UCI Road World Championships were organized in Sallanches, France.

== Medal summary ==
Event	Gold	Silver	Bronze
Men's Professional Events
Men's sprint	Antonio Maspes; Italy	Ron Baensch; Australia	Jos De Bakker; Belgium
Men's individual pursuit	Ferdinand Bracke; Belgium	Leandro Faggin; Italy	Ercole Baldini; Italy
Men's motor-paced	Guillermo Timoner; Spain	Leo Proost; Belgium	Karl-Heinz Marsell; West Germany
Men's Amateur Events
Men's sprint	Pierre Trentin; France	Daniel Morelon; France	Sergio Bianchetto; Italy
Men's individual pursuit	Tiemen Groen; Netherlands	Herman Van Loo; Belgium	Jiří Daler; Czechoslovakia
Men's team pursuit	West Germany; Lothar Claesges; Karl Link; Karl-Heinz Henrichs; Ernst Streng	Italy; Attilio Benfatto; Vincenzo Mantovani; Carlo Rancati; Franco Testa	Soviet Union; Arnold Belgardt; Leonid Kolumbet; Stanislav Moskvin; Sergey Tereshchenkov
Men's motor-paced	Jacob Oudkerk; Netherlands	Jean Walschaerts; Belgium	Daniel Salmon; France
Women's Events
Women's sprint	Irina Kiritchenko; Soviet Union	Galina Ermolaeva; Soviet Union	Gisèle Caille; France
Women's individual pursuit	Yvonne Reynders; Belgium	Beryl Burton; Great Britain	Aino Puronen; Soviet Union

== Medal table ==
Rank	Nation	Gold	Silver	Bronze	Total
1	Belgium (BEL)	2	3	1	6
2	Netherlands (NED)	2	0	0	2
3	Italy (ITA)	1	2	2	5
4	France (FRA)	1	1	2	4
4	Soviet Union (URS)	1	1	2	4
6	West Germany (FRG)	1	0	1	2
7	Spain (ESP)	1	0	0	1
8	Australia (AUS)	0	1	0	1
8	Great Britain (GBR)	0	1	0	1
10	Czechoslovakia (TCH)	0	0	1	1
Totals (10 entries)		9	9	9	27

== See also ==
- 1964 UCI Road World Championships
