= 1963 UCI Track Cycling World Championships =

Cycling competition

- Venue: Rocourt, Belgium
- Date: 1–7 August 1963
- Velodrome: Stade Vélodrome de Rocourt
- Events: 9

The 1963 UCI Track Cycling World Championships were the World Championship for track cycling. They took place in Rocourt, Belgium from 1 to 7 August 1963. Nine events were contested, 7 for men (3 for professionals, 4 for amateurs) and 2 for women.

In the same period, the 1963 UCI Road World Championships were organized in Ronse, Belgium.

== Medal summary ==
Event	Gold	Silver	Bronze
Men's Professional Events
Men's sprint	Sante Gaiardoni; Italy	Antonio Maspes; Italy	Jos De Bakker; Belgium
Men's individual pursuit	Leandro Faggin; Italy	Peter Post; Netherlands	Henk Nijdam; Netherlands
Men's motor-paced	Leo Proost; Belgium	Paul Depaepe; Belgium	Robert Varnajo; France
Men's Amateur Events
Men's sprint	Patrick Sercu; Belgium	Sergio Bianchetto; Italy	Pierre Trentin; France
Men's individual pursuit	Jan Walschaerts; Belgium	Stanislav Moskvin; Soviet Union	Hugh Porter; Great Britain
Men's team pursuit	Soviet Union; Arnold Belgardt; Sergey Tereshchenkov; Stanislav Moskvin; Leonid Kolumbet	West Germany; Lothar Claesges; Clemens Grossimlinghaus; Karl-Heinz Henrichs; Ernst Streng	Denmark; Bent Hansen; Preben Isaksson; Leif Larsen Kurt; Kurt Vid Stein
Men's motor-paced	Romain De Loof; Belgium	Karl-Heinz Matthes; East Germany	Uli Cuginbuhl; Switzerland
Women's Events
Women's sprint	Galina Ermolaeva; Soviet Union	Irina Kiritchenko; Soviet Union	Valentina Savina; Soviet Union
Women's individual pursuit	Beryl Burton; Great Britain	Yvonne Reynders; Belgium	Lyubov Rjabchenko; Soviet Union

== Medal table ==
Rank	Nation	Gold	Silver	Bronze	Total
1	Belgium (BEL)	4	2	1	7
2	Soviet Union (URS)	2	2	2	6
3	Italy (ITA)	2	2	0	4
4	Great Britain (GBR)	1	0	1	2
5	Netherlands (NED)	0	1	1	2
6	East Germany (RDA)	0	1	0	1
6	West Germany (FRG)	0	1	0	1
8	France (FRA)	0	0	2	2
9	Denmark (DEN)	0	0	1	1
9	Switzerland (SUI)	0	0	1	1
Totals (10 entries)		9	9	9	27

== See also ==
- 1963 UCI Road World Championships
