= 1965 UCI Track Cycling World Championships =

- Venue: San Sebastián, Spain
- Date: 6–12 September 1965
- Events: 9

The 1965 UCI Track Cycling World Championships were the world championships for track cycling that took place in San Sebastián, Spain from 6 to 12 September 1965. Nine events were contested, 7 for men (3 for professionals, 4 for amateurs) and 2 for women.

In the same period, the 1965 UCI Road World Championships were also organized in San Sebastián.

== Medal summary ==
Event	Gold	Silver	Bronze
Men's Professional Events
Men's sprint	Giuseppe Beghetto; Italy	Patrick Sercu; Belgium	Ron Baensch; Australia
Men's individual pursuit	Leandro Faggin; Italy	Ferdinand Bracke; Belgium	Dieter Kemper; West Germany
Men's motor-paced	Guillermo Timoner; Spain	Romain De Loof; Belgium	Jacob Oudkerk; Netherlands
Men's Amateur Events
Men's sprint	Omar Phakadze; Soviet Union	Giordano Turrini; Italy	Daniel Morelon; France
Men's individual pursuit	Tiemen Groen; Netherlands	Stanislav Moskvin; Soviet Union	Preben Isaksson; Denmark
Men's team pursuit	Soviet Union; Stanislav Moskvin; Sergey Tereshchenkov; Mikhail Kolyushev; Leonid Vukolov	Italy; Cipriano Chemello; Vincenzo Mantovani; Aroldo Spadoni; Luigi Roncaglia	Czechoslovakia; Jiří Daler; Milan Puzrla; Frantisek Rezak; Milos Jelinek
Men's motor-paced	Miguel Mas; Spain	Etienne Van der Vieren; Belgium	Alain Marechal; France
Women's Events
Women's sprint	Valentina Savina; Soviet Union	Galina Ermolaeva; Soviet Union	Karin Stüwe; East Germany
Women's individual pursuit	Yvonne Reynders; Belgium	Hannelore Mattig; East Germany	Aino Puronen; Soviet Union

== Medal table ==
Rank	Nation	Gold	Silver	Bronze	Total
1	Soviet Union (URS)	3	2	1	6
2	Italy (ITA)	2	2	0	4
3	Spain (ESP)	2	0	0	2
4	Belgium (BEL)	1	4	0	5
5	Netherlands (NED)	1	0	1	2
6	East Germany (RDA)	0	1	1	2
7	France (FRA)	0	0	2	2
8	Australia (AUS)	0	0	1	1
8	Czechoslovakia (TCH)	0	0	1	1
8	Denmark (DEN)	0	0	1	1
8	West Germany (FRG)	0	0	1	1
Totals (11 entries)		9	9	9	27

== See also ==
- 1965 UCI Road World Championships
