= Cycling at the 1964 Summer Olympics – Men's individual pursuit =

Men's cycling individual pursuit at the Games of the XVIII Olympiad
- Venue: Hachioji Road Race Course, Tokyo
- Date: 16–17 October 1964
- Competitors: 24 from 24 nations

Medalists
1st place, gold medalist(s)		Jiří Daler	Czechoslovakia
2nd place, silver medalist(s)		Giorgio Ursi	Italy
3rd place, bronze medalist(s)		Preben Isaksson	Denmark

The men's individual pursuit was a track cycling event held as part of the Cycling at the 1964 Summer Olympics programme. The course was 4000 metres. It was the first time the event had been held at the Olympics and took place on 16 October and 17 October 1964 at the Hachioji Velodrome. 24 cyclists competed.

== Medalists ==
Gold	Silver	Bronze
Jiří Daler; Czechoslovakia	Giorgio Ursi; Italy	Preben Isaksson; Denmark

== Results ==
=== Heats ===
In the first round of heats, the 24 cyclists were divided into 12 pairs. Placing in the heats was not used to advanced; instead the 8 fastest cyclists from across the heats advanced to the quarterfinals.

Heat 1
1.	Tiemen Groen (NED)	4:57.48	QQ
2.	Hugh Porter (GBR)	5:03.16	QQ
Heat 2
1.	Jiří Daler (TCH)	5:00.55	QQ
2.	Lothar Spiegelberg (EUA)	5:04.60	QQ
Heat 3
1.	Herman Van Loo (BEL)	5:07.22
2.	Richard Hine (AUS)	5:16.55
Heat 4
1.	Giorgio Ursi (ITA)	5:01.41	QQ
2.	Lucjan Józefowicz (POL)	5:05.01	QQ
Heat 5
1.	Stanislav Moskvin (URS)	5:05.67	QQ
2.	Robert Varga (FRA)	5:14.57
Heat 6
1.	Preben Isaksson (DEN)	5:01.88	QQ
2.	Rubén Etchebarne (URU)	5:17.11
Heat 7
1.	Hiromi Yamafuji (JPN)	5:17.57
2.	Martín Rodríguez (COL)	5:17.77
Heat 8
1.	Khem Son (CAM)	6:05.87
2.	Chow Kwong Choi (HKG)	DNF
Heat 9
1.	Amar Singh Sokhi (IND)	5:56.98
2.	Tjow Choon Boon (MAS)	Elim.
Heat 10
1.	Ronald Cassidy (TRI)	5:35.64
2.	Smaisuk Krisansuwan (THA)	6:00.76
Heat 11
1.	Skip Cutting (USA)	5:25.59
2.	Trần Văn Nen (VIE)	Elim.
Heat 12
1.	Antonio Duque (MEX)	5:19.98
2.	Muhammad Ashiq (PAK)	Elim.

=== Quarterfinals ===
The quarterfinals paired off the 8 remaining cyclists into 4 heats. Winners advanced, losers were eliminated.

Quarterfinal 1
1.	Tiemen Groen (NED)	4:59.59	QS
2.	Stanislav Moskvin (URS)	5:02.27
Quarterfinal 2
1.	Jiří Daler (TCH)	5:00.70	QS
2.	Lucjan Józefowicz (POL)	5:07.08
Quarterfinal 3
1.	Giorgio Ursi (ITA)	5:02.43	QS
2.	Lothar Spiegelberg (EUA)	5:09.84
Quarterfinal 4
1.	Preben Isaksson (DEN)	5:01.13	QS
2.	Hugh Porter (GBR)	5:04.66

=== Semifinals ===
The winner of each semifinal advanced to the gold medal match, while the loser was sent to the bronze medal match.

Semifinal 1
1.	Giorgio Ursi (ITA)	4:56.64	QG
2.	Tiemen Groen (NED)	5:01.36	QB
Semifinal 2
1.	Jiří Daler (TCH)	4:59.97	QG
2.	Preben Isaksson (DEN)	5:02.23	QB

=== Finals ===
Gold medal match
	Jiří Daler (TCH)	5:04.75
	Giorgio Ursi (ITA)	5:05.96
Bronze medal match
	Preben Isaksson (DEN)	5:01.90
4.	Tiemen Groen (NED)	5:04.21

== Sources ==
- Tokyo Organizing Committee (1964). The Games of the XVIII Olympiad: Tokyo 1964, vol. 2.
