= Cycling at the 1963 Mediterranean Games =

Cycling competition

- Location: Naples, Italy
- Dates: September 1963

The cycling events of the 1963 Mediterranean Games were in Naples, Italy.

== Medalists ==
=== Road cycling ===
Games	Gold	Silver	Bronze
Individual road race	Francis Bazire (FRA)	Dino Zandegù (ITA)	Lucien Aimar (FRA)
Team time trial	Italy (ITA)	France (FRA); Marcel-Ernest Bidault; Georges Chappe	Spain (ESP); Mariano Díaz; José Manuel López Rodríguez; Ramón Sáez Marzo

=== Track cycling ===
Games	Gold	Silver	Bronze
Individual pursuit	Christian Cuch (FRA)	Pietro Scandelli (ITA)	Miro Lopez (ESP)
Team pursuit	Italy (ITA); Luigi Roncaglia; Franco Testa	France (FRA); Christian Cuch; Joseph Pare; Jacques Suire	Morocco (MAR)
Sprint	Angelo Damiano (ITA)	Giordano Turrini (ITA)	Daniel Morelon (FRA)
Tandem	Italy (ITA); Sergio Bianchetto; Giovanni Pettenella	France (FRA)	Morocco (MAR)
Time trial	Sergio Bianchetto (ITA)	Pierre Trentin (FRA)	Moustafa Belcayd (MAR)

== Medal table ==
Rank	Nation	Gold	Silver	Bronze	Total
1	Italy (ITA)	5	3	0	8
2	France (FRA)	2	4	2	8
3	Morocco (MAR)	0	0	3	3
4	Spain (ESP)	0	0	2	2
Totals (4 entries)		7	7	7	21
