= List of Summer Olympics venues: H–I =

For the Summer Olympics, there were 33 venues starting with the letter 'H' and seven venues starting with the letter 'I'.

== H ==
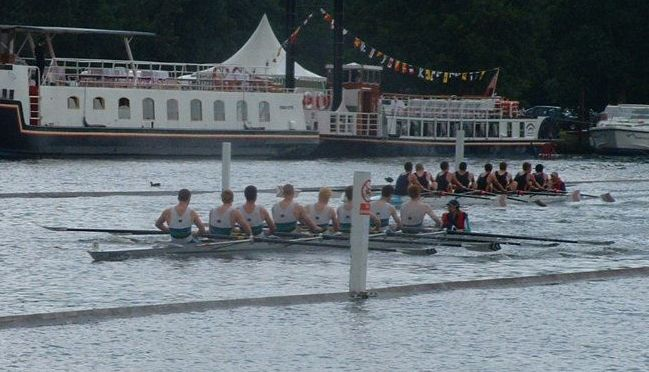
Two crews racing in the Temple Challenge Cup at Henley in 2003. The regatta hosted the rowing events for both the 1908 and 1948 Summer Olympics and the canoeing events for the 1948 Summer Olympics.

Venue	Games	Sports	Capacity	Ref.
Hachioji City	1964 Tokyo	Cycling (road)	3,000	
Hachioji Velodrome	1964 Tokyo	Cycling (track)	4,100	
Hadleigh Farm	2012 London	Cycling (mountain biking)	20,000 (includes 3,000 seating)	
Hämeenlinna	1952 Helsinki	Modern pentathlon	Not listed.	
Hampden Park	2012 London	Football	52,000	
Han River Regatta Course/Canoeing Site	1988 Seoul	Canoeing, Rowing	25,000	
Hanyang University Gymnasium	1988 Seoul	Volleyball	8,000	
Harmaja	1952 Helsinki	Sailing	Not listed.	
Harringay Arena	1948 London	Basketball, Wrestling	Not listed.	
Harvard Stadium	1984 Los Angeles	Football	30,323	
Haus des Deutschen Sports	1936 Berlin	Fencing, Modern pentathlon (fencing)	1200	
Helliniko Indoor Arena	2004 Athens	Basketball, Handball (final)	10,000	
Helsinki Football Grounds	1952 Helsinki	Football	10,770.	
Henley Royal Regatta	1908 London	Rowing	Not listed.	
Henley Royal Regatta	1948 London	Canoeing, Rowing	Not listed.	
Heritage Park Aquatic Center	1984 Los Angeles	Modern pentathlon (swimming)	8,000	
Herne Hill Velodrome	1948 London	Cycling (track)	Not listed.	
Hertha-BSC Field	1936 Berlin	Football	35,239	
Hindmarsh Stadium	2000 Sydney	Football	20,000	
Hippodrome d'Auteuil	1924 Paris	Equestrian	8,922	
Hilversum	1928 Amsterdam	Equestrian (non-jumping), Modern pentathlon (running)	4,763	
Hockeyanlage	1972 Munich	Field hockey	21,900	
Hockey Field	1956 Melbourne	Field hockey	21,048	
Hockey Stadion	1936 Berlin	Field hockey (final)	18,000	
Hockey Stadion #2	1936 Berlin	Field hockey	1,600	
Hohenstaufenhalle Göppingen	1972 Munich	Handball	5,599	
Hong Kong Equestrian Venues	2008 Beijing	Equestrian	18,000	
Hoogboom Military Camp	1920 Antwerp	Shooting (trap shooting, running target)	Not listed.	
Horse Guards Parade	2012 London	Volleyball (beach)	15,000.	
Huopalahti	1952 Helsinki	Shooting (shotgun)	Not listed.	
Hurlingham Club	1908 London	Polo	Not listed.	
Hwarang Archery Field	1988 Seoul	Archery	1,200	
Hyde Park	2012 London	Marathon swimming, Triathlon	3,000.	

== I ==
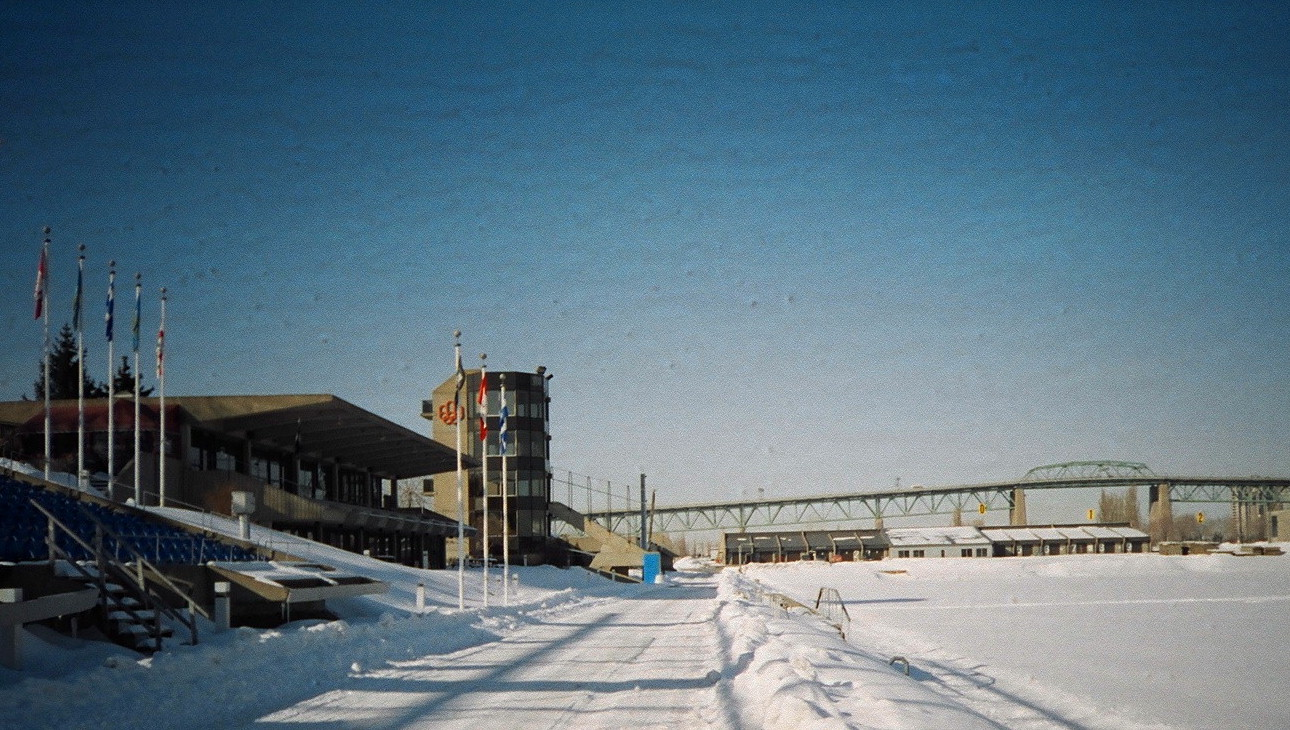
Notre Dame Island canoeing and rowing basin during winter 2006. The venue hosted the canoeing and rowing events for the 1976 Summer Olympics in Montreal.

Venue	Games	Sports	Capacity	Ref.
Notre Dame Island	1976 Montreal	Canoeing, Rowing	27,000	
Indoor Stadium	1980 Moscow	Basketball (final), Boxing	16,500	
Institut National d'Educació Física de Catalunya	1992 Barcelona	Wrestling	400	
Insurgentes Ice Rink	1968 Mexico City	Wrestling	3,386	
Insurgentes Theatre	1968 Mexico City	Weightlifting	1,100	
Issy-les-Moulineaux	1924 Paris	Shooting (trap shooting, including team event)	41	
Izmailovo Sports Palace	1980 Moscow	Weightlifting	5,000	
