= Antonín Kříž =

Antonín Kříž may refer to:

- Antonín Kříž (biathlete) (1953–2025), Czech Olympic biathlete
- Antonín Kříž (cyclist) (born 1943), Czech Olympic cyclist
