= Ron Baensch =

Australian racing cyclist

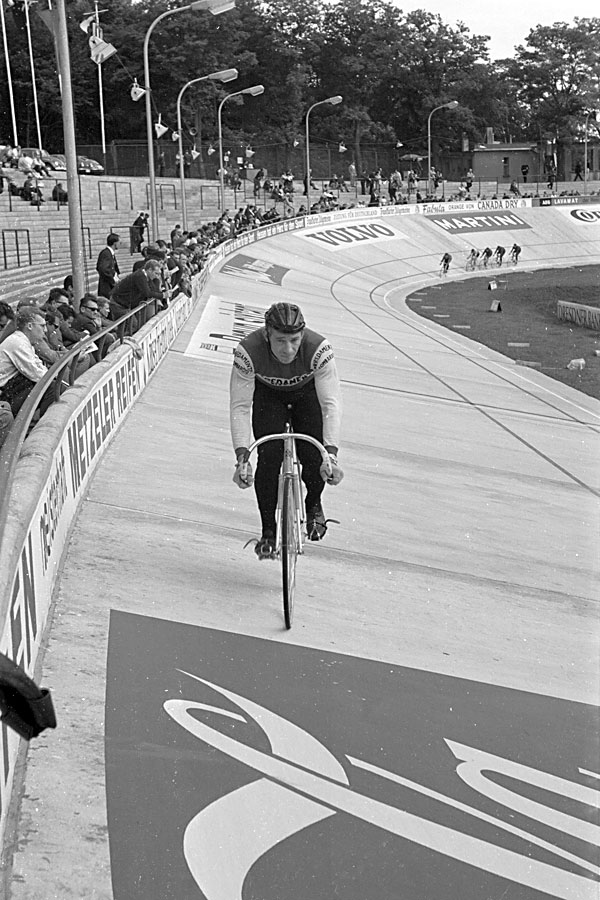
- Baensch at the 1966 UCI Track Cycling World Championships

Personal information
- Full name: Ronald Baensch
- Born: 5 June 1939 Melbourne, Australia
- Died: 28 December 2017 (aged 78)
- Height: 1.77 m (5 ft 9 1/2 in)
- Weight: 58 kg (128 lb; 9.1 st)

Cycling career
- Sport: Cycling
- Current team: Retired
- Discipline: Track
- Role: Rider
- Rider type: Sprinter

Professional teams
- 1965: Lamot-Libertas
- 1966: Libertas
- 1967: Casagrande
- 1970: Carlton-Truwel-Campagnolo
Medal record
Representing Australia
Men's track cycling
World Championships
Bronze medal – third place	1961 Zurich	Amateur Sprint
Silver medal – second place	1964 Paris	Sprint
Bronze medal – third place	1965 San Sebastian	Sprint
Silver medal – second place	1966 Frankfurt	Sprint

Ronald Baensch (5 June 1939 – 28 December 2017) was an Australian racing cyclist, specialising in track sprinting events. He represented Australia at the 1960 Olympics and several World Championships in the 1960s and in 1970.

== Cycling career ==
=== 1960 Olympic Games ===
Baensch competed in the 1,000 metre sprint at the 1960 Summer Olympics in Rome. Losing to eventual gold medalist Sante Gaiardoni in the semi-final and to Valentino Gasparella in the final round race for bronze, Baensch finished in fourth place.

=== UCI Track Cycling World Championships ===
Baensch won a bronze medal in the men's amateur sprint at the 1961 World Championships in Zurich. After turning professional in 1964, he won silver in the men's sprint at the 1964 World Championships in Paris, bronze in the 1965 (San Sebastian) and silver again in 1966 (Frankfurt).

Baensch was fined ƒ 2,000 and disqualified from the 1967 World Championships in Amsterdam after testing positive to ephedrine. He claimed to have taken the drug to combat a heavy cold.

Baensch was beaten by Angelo Damiano in the quarter-finals at the 1970 World Championships in Leicester. In 1962 and 1963 he won the International Champion of Champions sprint at Herne Hill velodrome.

== Later life ==
After his professional cycling career, Baensch was a truck driver in Europe and, on his return to Australia in 1974, he settled in Newcastle, New South Wales and worked on oil rigs. He continued to compete in local cycle races in Australia until 1980, winning his last race. In 2011, Baensch was inducted into the Victorian Cycling Hall of Fame.

He died on 28 December 2017 at the age of 78.
