= Jiří Pecka =

Jiří Pecka may refer to:

- Jiří Pecka (canoeist) (1917–1997), Czech canoeist
- Jiří Pecka (cyclist) (1940–2021), Czechoslovak cyclist
