= Cencio Mantovani =

Italian cyclist (1941–1989)

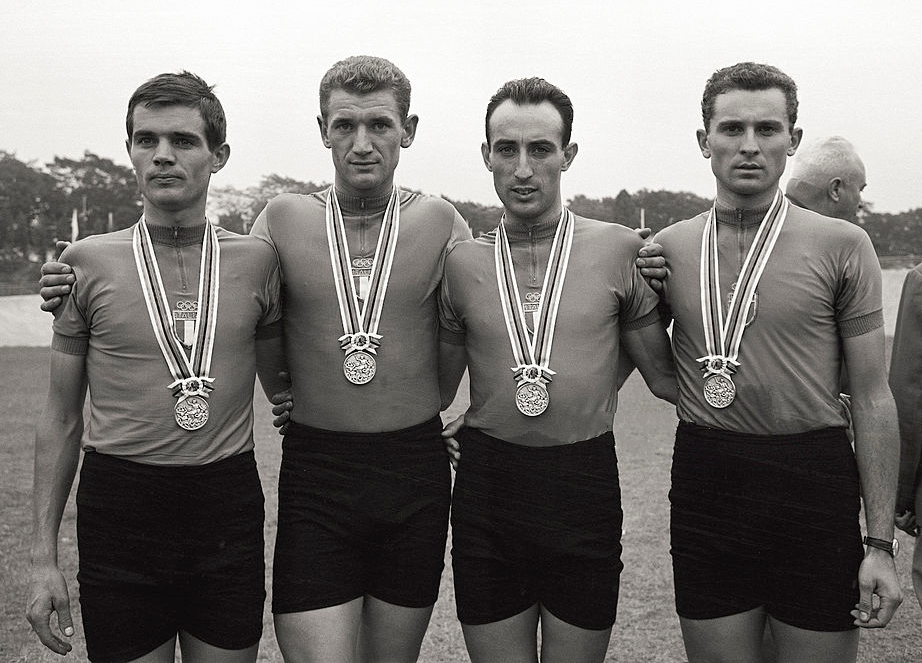
- Mantovani (left) at the 1964 Olympics, with Luigi Roncaglia, Franco Testa and Carlo Rancati

Personal information
- Full name: Vincenzo Mantovani
- Nationality: Italian
- Born: 17 October 1941 Castel d'Ario, Italy
- Died: 21 October 1989 (aged 48) Suzzara, Italy
- Height: 1.71 m (5 ft 7 1/2 in)
- Weight: 70 kg (150 lb)

Sport
- Sport: Track cycling
Medal record
Representing Italy
Olympic Games
Silver medal – second place	1964 Tokyo	Team pursuit
World championships
Silver medal – second place	1964 Paris	Team pursuit
Silver medal – second place	1965 San Sebastian	Team pursuit

Vincenzo "Cencio" Mantovani (17 October 1941 – 21 October 1989) was an Italian cyclist.

== Background ==
He competed as an amateur track racer in the team pursuit at the 1964 Olympics and at the world championships in 1964 and 1965, winning silver medals on all occasions. He then became a professional road racer, but with little success.
