= Pecka (disambiguation) =

Pecka is a market town in the Czech Republic.

Pecka may also refer to:

- Pecka (surname), a Czech surname
- Pecka (footballer), Brazilian footballer
- Pecka (Osečina), a village in Serbia
- Pecka, Sisak-Moslavina County, a village in Croatia
- Pečka, Serbian name for Pecica, a town in Romania

== See also ==
- Pečky, a town in the Czech Republic
