= Henk Vogels =

Australian cyclist

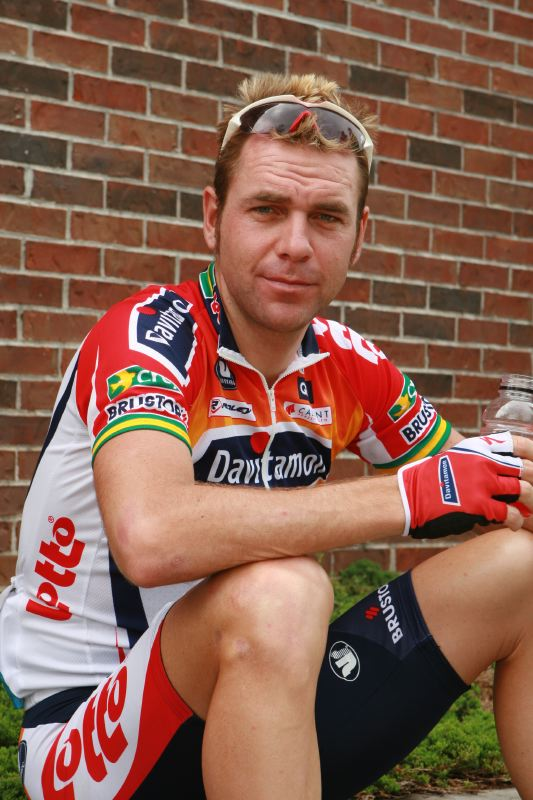
- Vogels at the 2006 Tour de Georgia

Personal information
- Full name: Hendricus Vogels
- Born: 31 July 1973 (age 53) Perth, Western Australia
- Height: 1.83 m (6 ft 0 in)
- Weight: 75 kg (165 lb; 11 st 11 lb)

Cycling career
- Sport: Cycling
- Discipline: Road
- Role: Rider

Professional teams
- 1995–1996: Novell–Decca–Colnago
- 1997–1999: GAN
- 2000–2002: Mercury Cycling Team
- 2003–2004: Navigators Cycling Team
- 2005–2006: Davitamon–Lotto
- 2007–2008: Toyota–United Pro Cycling Team
Medal record
Men's road bicycle racing
Representing Australia
Commonwealth Games
Gold medal – first place	1994 Victoria	Team Time Trial

Hendricus "Henk" Vogels (born 31 July 1973, in Perth) is an Australian former professional road bicycle racer who retired from competition at the end of the 2008 season, riding with the Toyota–United Pro Cycling Team. He won the Australian national road race title in 1999. He was an Australian Institute of Sport scholarship holder. He was subsequently directeur sportif of the Fly V-Successful Living team. Vogels also provides expert opinion for SBS Cycling Central. Vogels served as sports director of the Drapac Professional Cycling team in 2014, however he left the team at the end of the season in order to take a break from the sport in 2015 and spend more time with his family. In 2019 he was announced as the sports director of the Australian ARA Pro Racing cycling team, based in Queensland.

His father, Henk Vogels Sr, was a former Australian cyclist who competed in the team pursuit at the 1964 Summer Olympics.

== Major results ==
1994
1st Stage 1 Commonwealth Bank Classic
1995
1st Stage 14, Herald Sun Tour
1996
1st Stage 6, Tour de l'Avenir
1st Stage 2, Wien-Rabenstein-Gresten-Wien
1997
1st Duo Normand (with Cyril Bos)
3rd Paris–Tours
3rd Stage 21 Tour de France
10th Paris–Roubaix
1998
10th Paris–Roubaix
1999
1st National Road Race Champion
2000
1st First Union USPRO Championships
1st Clásica Internacional de Alcobendas
1st Zomergem-Adinkerke
1st Stage 2, Vuelta a Asturias
1st Stage 1, Vuelta a La Rioja
1st Stage 1, Herald Sun Tour
2001
1st Overall Grand Prix Cycliste de Beauce

1st Stage 3

1st Stage 7 Herald Sun Tour
1st Stage 11 Herald Sun Tour
2002
1st Stage 6a, Grand Prix Cycliste de Beauce
1st Stage 12, Herald Sun Tour
1st USPRO Criterium Championships
2003
1st Stage 1, Tour of Georgia
2nd Gent–Wevelgem
