= Van Baalen =

Van Baalen is a Dutch surname. Notable people with the surname include:

- Coby van Baalen (born 1957), Dutch equestrian
- Hans van Baalen (1960–2021), Dutch politician
- Marlies van Baalen (born 1980), Dutch equestrian
- Vinus van Baalen (1942–2012), Dutch swimmer
