= Jaap Reesink =

Dutch rower

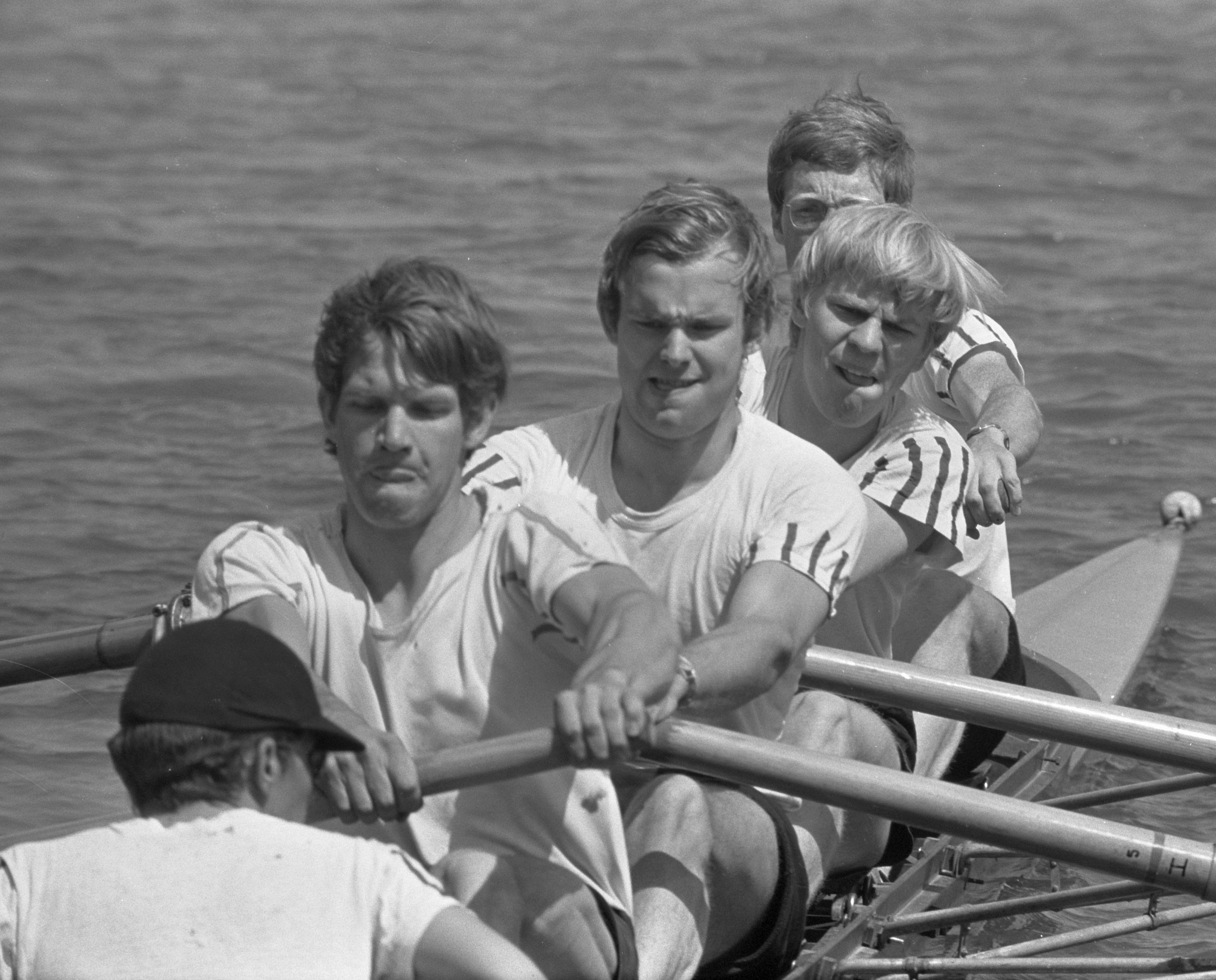
- Arthur Koning, Gee van Enst, Jaap Reesink, Frank Constandse and Paul Veenemans in 1969

Personal information
- Born: 22 August 1946 (age 79) Amsterdam, the Netherlands
- Height: 1.94 m (6 ft 4 in)
- Weight: 92 kg (203 lb)

Sport
- Sport: Rowing
- Club: Nereus, Amsterdam

Jaap Reesink (born 22 August 1946) is a retired Dutch rower. He competed at the 1968 Summer Olympics in the eight event and finished in eighth place.
