= Pecka (surname) =

Pecka (feminine Pecková) is a Czech surname meaning "kernel" (of a fruit). Notable people include:

- Dagmar Pecková, Czech opera singer
- Jan Pecka, Czech canoeist
- Jiří Pecka (canoeist), Czech canoeist
- Jiří Pecka (cyclist), Czech cyclist
- Josef Boleslav Pecka, Czech journalist and politician
- Květa Jeriová-Pecková
- Luboš Pecka, Czech footballer
- Tereza Pecková, Czech basketball player
- Zdeněk Pecka, Czech rower

== See also ==
- Asteroid 18460 Pecková, named after Dagmar Pecková
- Pecka (footballer), nickname of a Brazilian footballer
