= Lothar Spiegelberg =

German cyclist

Personal information
- Born: 27 October 1939 (age 86) Berlin, Germany
- Height: 171 cm (5 ft 7 in)
- Weight: 70 kg (154 lb)

Cycling career
- Sport: Cycling

Professional team
- Zehlendorfer Eichhörnchen, Berlin

Lothar Spiegelberg (born 27 October 1939) is a former German cyclist. He competed in the individual pursuit at the 1964 Summer Olympics.
