= Kevin Brislin =

Australian cyclist

Personal information
- Born: 26 November 1942 (age 83)
- Height: 188 cm (6 ft 2 in)
- Weight: 79 kg (174 lb)

Cycling career
- Sport: Cycling

Kevin Brislin (born 26 November 1942) is a former Australian cyclist. He competed in the team pursuit at the 1964 Summer Olympics.
