= Elio Juárez =

Uruguayan cyclist

Personal information
- Full name: Elio Juárez Rivero
- Born: 18 April 1942 (age 84) Cerro Largo, Uruguay
- Weight: 72 kg (159 lb)

Cycling career
- Sport: Cycling

Elio Juárez Rivero (Note: In this Spanish name, the first or paternal surname is Juárez and the second or maternal family name is Rivero.) (born 18 April 1942) is a former Uruguayan cyclist. He competed in the team pursuit event at the 1964 Summer Olympics.
