= Lucjan Józefowicz =

Polish cyclist (1935–2023)

Personal information
- Born: 30 June 1935 Uniejów, Poland
- Died: 30 September 2023 (aged 88)
- Height: 175 cm (5 ft 9 in)
- Weight: 72 kg (159 lb)

Cycling career
- Sport: Cycling

Professional team
- Włókniarz Łódź, Poland

Lucjan Józefowicz (30 June 1935 – 30 September 2023) was a Polish cyclist. He competed in the individual pursuit at the 1964 Summer Olympics. Józefowicz died on 30 September 2023, at the age of 88.
