= Lal Bakhsh =

Pakistani cyclist (born 1943)

Personal information
- Born: 4 November 1943 (age 82)

Cycling career
- Sport: Cycling

Lal Bakhsh (born 4 November 1943) was a Pakistani cyclist and former leader of the Pakistan Peoples Party. He competed in the team pursuit event at the 1964 Summer Olympics.
