= Aino Puronen =

Personal information
- Full name: Aino Andreyevna Puronen
- Born: 20 January 1936 (age 90) Tosno, Russia

Cycling career
- Sport: Cycling
- Disciplines: Road, Track
- Role: Rider
Medal record
Representing Soviet Union
Road World Championships
Silver medal – second place	1959 Zandvoort	Road race
Bronze medal – third place	1963 Renaix	Road race
Bronze medal – third place	1965 Lasarte-Oria	Road race
Bronze medal – third place	1966 Nürburgring	Road race
Track World Championships
Bronze medal – third place	1964 Paris	Individual pursuit
Bronze medal – third place	1965 San Sebastián	Individual pursuit

Aino Andreyevna Puronen, also Pouronen (Russian: Айно Андреевна Пуронен, born 20 January 1936) is a former Soviet racing cyclist. She won the silver medal at the 1959 UCI Road World Championships.
