= Kamsari Salam =

Malaysian cyclist

Personal information
- Born: 10 January 1941 (age 85)

Cycling career
- Sport: Cycling

Kamsari Salam (born 10 January 1941) is a Malaysian former cyclist. He competed in the team pursuit event at the 1964 Summer Olympics, but the team did not finish.
