= Cor Schuuring =

Dutch road and track cyclist

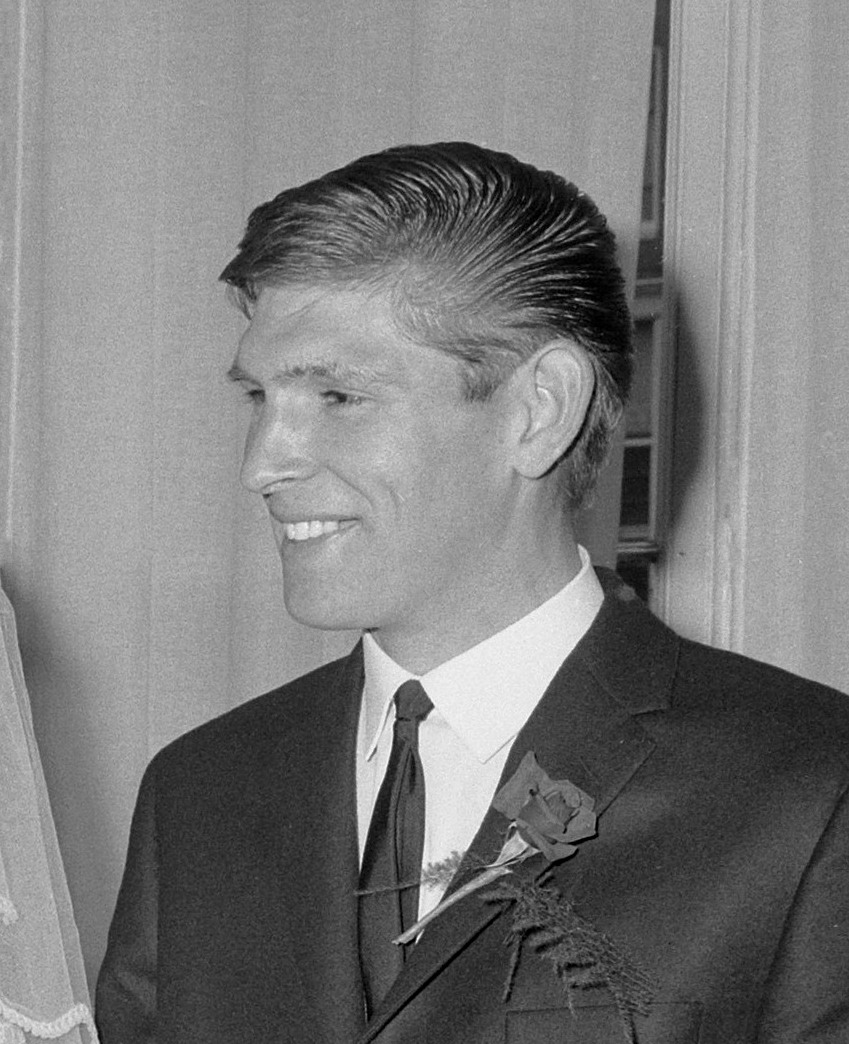
- Cor Schuuring in 1964

Personal information
- Born: 30 March 1942 (age 84) Amsterdam, the Netherlands
- Height: 1.60 m (5 ft 3 in)
- Weight: 60 kg (130 lb)

Sport
- Sport: Cycling
Medal record
Representing Netherlands
Olympic Games
Bronze medal – third place	1964 Tokyo	Team pursuit

Cornelis "Cor" Schuuring (born 30 March 1942) is a retired Dutch road and track cyclist. His sporting career began with Olympia Amsterdam. He won a bronze medal in the 4,000 m team pursuit along with Henk Cornelisse, Gerard Koel and Jaap Oudkerk at the 1964 Summer Olympics.

As a road racer, he won a national title in 1962 and the Olympia's Tour in 1964, as well as several local races between 1961 and 1969.

== Major results ==
1963
1st Stage 6 Olympia's Tour
1964
1st Overall Olympia's Tour

1st Stage 3

1965
9th Grand Prix de Denain
1966
6th Amstel Gold Race

== See also ==
- List of Dutch Olympic cyclists
