= Victor Browne =

Australian cyclist

Victor (Vic) Browne
Personal information
- Full name: Victor George Browne
- Born: 10 January 1942 (age 84) Sydney, New South Wales, Australia
- Height: 185 cm (6 ft 1 in)
- Weight: 79 kg (174 lb)

Cycling career
- Sport: Cycling

Victor (Vic) Browne (born 10 January 1942) is a former Australian cyclist. He competed in the team pursuit at the 1964 Summer Olympics. He won the Austral Wheel Race in 1967.
