= Fujio Ito =

Japanese cyclist (born 1945)

Personal information
- Born: 24 February 1945 (age 81)
- Height: 177 cm (5 ft 10 in)
- Weight: 75 kg (165 lb)

Cycling career
- Sport: Cycling

Fujio Ito (伊藤 富士夫, Itō Fujio; born 24 February 1945) is a former Japanese cyclist. He competed in the team pursuit at the 1964 Summer Olympics. From 1967 to 1999 he was a professional keirin cyclist with a total of 11 championships and 356 wins in his career.
