= 1963 UCI Road World Championships =

- Location within Belgium
- Venue: Ronse, Belgium
- Date: 10–11 August 1963
- Coordinates: 50°45′N 03°36′E

The 1963 UCI Road World Championships took place from 10 to 11 August 1963 in Ronse, Belgium.

In the same period, the 1963 UCI Track Cycling World Championships were organized in Rocourt, Belgium.

== Results ==
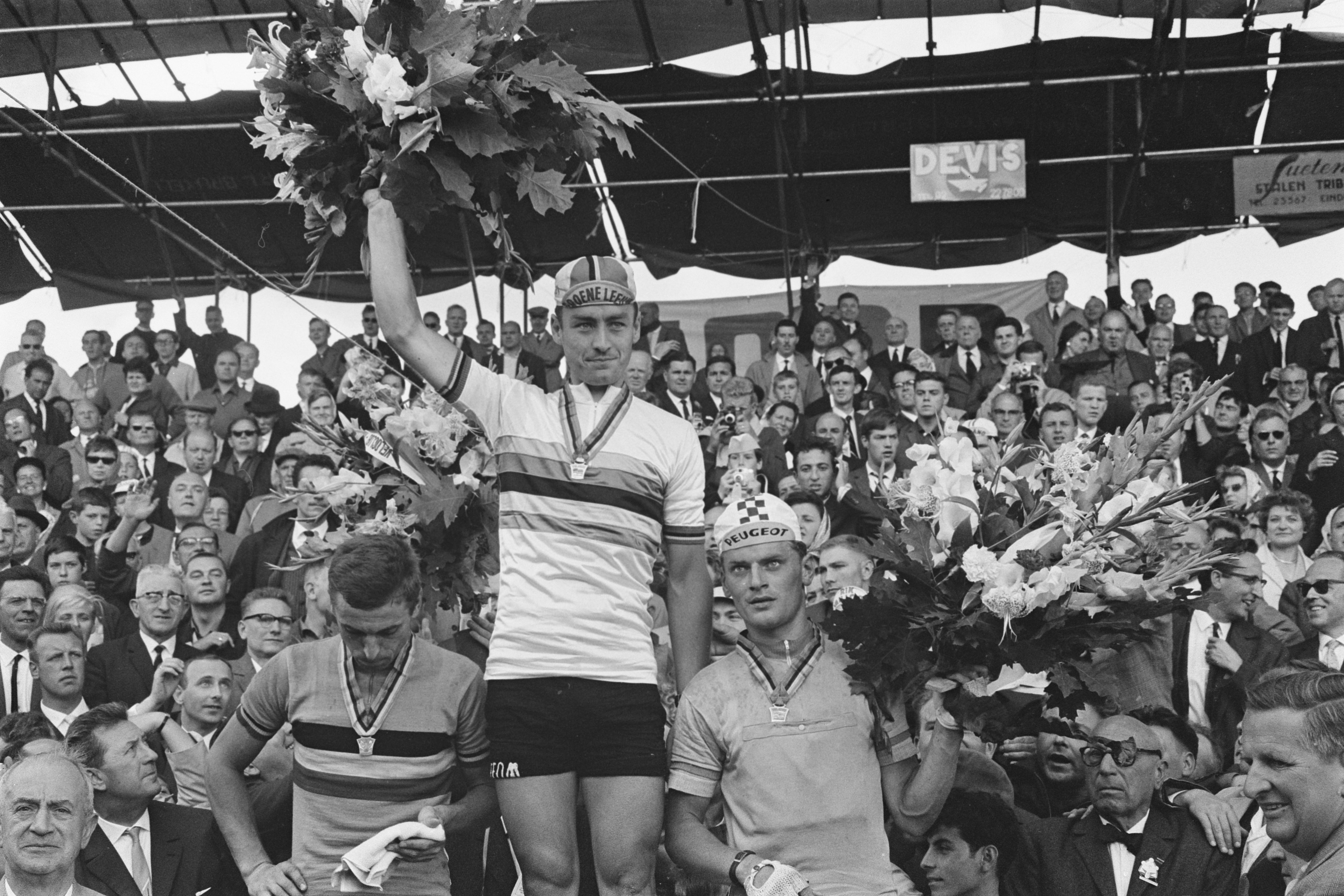
The 1963 Road World Championship podium: Rik Van Looy, Benoni Beheyt and Jo de Haan

Race:	Gold:	Time	Silver:	Time	Bronze:	Time
Men
Men's road race	Benoni Beheyt; Belgium	7 h 25 min 26s	Rik Van Looy; Belgium	m.t.	Jo de Haan; Netherlands	m.t.
Amateurs' road race	Flaviano Vicentini; Italy	-	Francis Bazire; France	-	Winfried Bölke; West Germany	-
Amateurs' team mountain race	France; Michel Bechet; Dominique Motte; Marcel-Ernest Bidault; Georges Chappe	–	Italy; Mario Maino; Pasquale Fabbri; Danilo Grassi; Dino Zandegù	–	Soviet Union; Viktor Kapitonov; Gainan Saidschushin; Yuri Melichov; Anatoli Olizarenko	-
Women
Women's road race	Yvonne Reynders; Belgium	-	Rosa Sels; Belgium	-	Aino Puronen; Soviet Union	-

== Medal table ==
Rank	Nation	Gold	Silver	Bronze	Total
1	Belgium (BEL)	2	2	0	4
2	France (FRA)	1	1	0	2
2	Italy (ITA)	1	1	0	2
4	Soviet Union (URS)	0	0	2	2
5	Netherlands (NED)	0	0	1	1
5	West Germany (FRG)	0	0	1	1
Totals (6 entries)		4	4	4	12
