= Donald Nelsen =

American cyclist

Personal information
- Born: September 4, 1944 (age 82) St. Louis, United States
- Height: 173 cm (5 ft 8 in)
- Weight: 66 kg (146 lb)

Cycling career
- Sport: Cycling

Professional team
- St. Louis Cycling Club, St. Louis

Donald Nelsen (born September 4, 1944) is a former American cyclist. He competed in the team pursuit at the 1964 Summer Olympics.
