= Hendricus Vogels =

Australian cyclist (1942–2019)

Henk Vogels
Personal information
- Full name: Hendricus Vogels
- Born: 1 November 1942 Haarlem, Netherlands
- Died: 9 August 2019 (aged 76)
- Height: 182 cm (6 ft 0 in)
- Weight: 81 kg (179 lb)

Cycling career
- Sport: Cycling

Professional team
- Caballero

Major wins
- Australian Pursuit Championship 1963

Hendricus 'Henk' Vogels OAM (1 November 1942 – 9 August 2019) was an Australian cyclist, cycling coach and administrator. He competed in the team pursuit at the 1964 Summer Olympics.

His son, Henk Vogels Jr, is a former Australian cyclist who competed in the individual road race at the 2000 Summer Olympics.

He was awarded the Order of Australia Medal in 2007 for services to cycling. He created the Henk Vogels Cycling Foundation to assist young cyclists in Western Australia.
