= Carlos Alberto Álvarez =

Argentine cyclist

Personal information
- Born: 19 July 1941 (age 85)
- Height: 166 cm (5 ft 5 in)
- Weight: 66 kg (146 lb)

Cycling career
- Sport: Cycling

Carlos Alberto Álvarez (born 19 July 1941) is a former Argentine cyclist. He competed at the 1964 Summer Olympics in the team pursuit event.

== See also ==
- Carlos Miguel Álvarez
