= Kosaku Takahashi =

Japanese cyclist

Personal information
- Born: 25 July 1944 (age 82)
- Height: 167 cm (5 ft 6 in)
- Weight: 63 kg (139 lb)

Cycling career
- Sport: Cycling

Kosaku Takahashi (高橋 耕作, Takahashi Kōsaku; born 25 July 1944) is a former Japanese cyclist. He competed in the team pursuit at the 1964 Summer Olympics.
