= Brian Sandy =

British cyclist

Personal information
- Nickname: Sandy B
- Born: 24 November 1932 (age 93) Taunton, England
- Height: 172 cm (5 ft 8 in)
- Weight: 67 kg (148 lb)

Cycling career
- Sport: Cycling

Brian Sandy (born 24 November 1932) is a former British cyclist. He competed in the team pursuit at the 1964 Summer Olympics.
