= Henk Cornelisse =

Dutch cyclist (1940–2026)

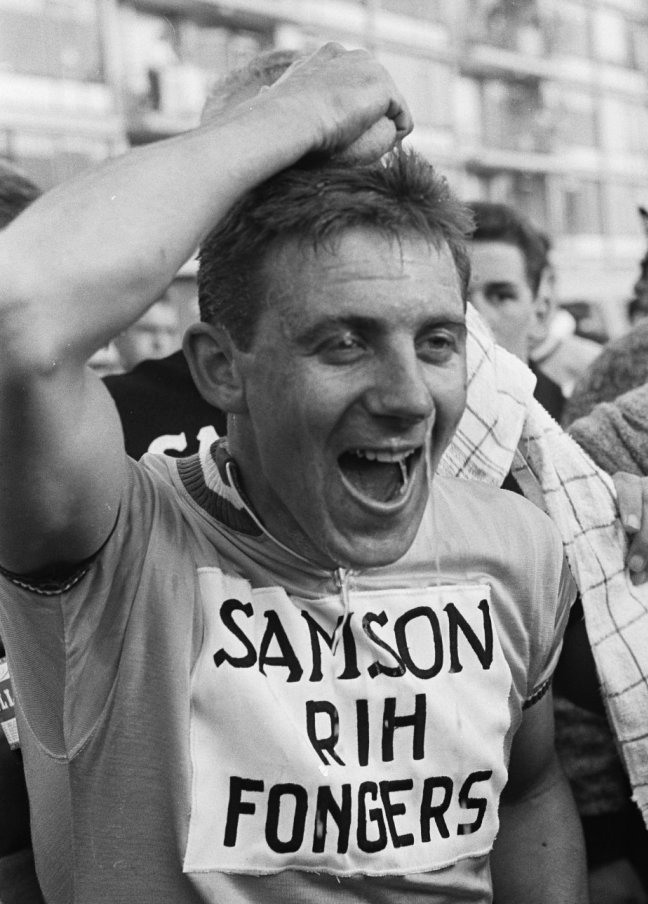
- Cornelisse in 1964

Personal information
- Born: 16 October 1940 Amsterdam, German-occupied Netherlands
- Died: 8 October 2026 (aged 85)
- Height: 1.78 m (5 ft 10 in)
- Weight: 72 kg (159 lb)

Sport
- Sport: Cycling
Medal record
Representing Netherlands
Olympic Games
Bronze medal – third place	1964 Tokyo	Team pursuit

Hendrik Jan Willem "Henk" Cornelisse (16 October 1940 – 8 October 2026) was a Dutch cyclist. His sporting career began with Olympia Amsterdam. He won a bronze medal in the 4 km team pursuit along with Cor Schuuring, Gerard Koel and Jaap Oudkerk at the 1964 Summer Olympics. He also won the Ronde van Noord-Holland and Ronde van Overijssel in 1962 and one stage of the Olympia's Tour in 1964. Cornelisse died on 8 October 2026, at the age of 85.

== See also ==
- List of Dutch Olympic cyclists
