= Robert Baird (cyclist) =

Australian cyclist (born 1942)

Personal information
- Full name: Robert Alexander Baird
- Born: 29 November 1942 (age 83)
- Height: 184 cm (6 ft 0 in)
- Weight: 78 kg (172 lb)

Cycling career
- Sport: Cycling

Robert Baird (born 29 November 1942) is a former Australian cyclist. He competed in the team pursuit at the 1964 Summer Olympics.

He is the uncle of Stuart O'Grady, the Australian cyclist who won a gold medal in the men's madison at the 2004 Summer Olympics.
