= Ole Højlund Pedersen =

Danish cyclist (born 1943)

Personal information
- Born: 17 February 1943 (age 83) Aarhus, Denmark

Cycling career
- Sport: Cycling

Ole Højlund Pedersen (born 17 February 1943) is a Danish former cyclist. He competed at the 1964 Summer Olympics and the 1968 Summer Olympics.
