= Preben Isaksson =

Danish cyclist (1943–2008)

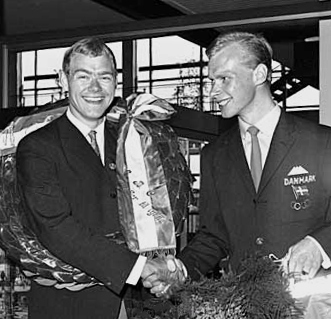
- Kjell Rodian and Preben Isaksson (right) in 1964

Personal information
- Born: 22 January 1943 Copenhagen, Denmark
- Died: 27 December 2008 (aged 65) Greve, Denmark
- Height: 183 cm (6 ft 0 in)
- Weight: 73 kg (161 lb)

Cycling career
- Sport: Cycling
- Discipline: Track

Amateur team
- 1961–67: CK Fix, Rødovre
Medal record
Representing Denmark
Olympic Games
Bronze medal – third place	1964 Tokyo	Individual pursuit
UCI Track Cycling World Championships
Silver medal – second place	1962 Milan	Team pursuit
Bronze medal – third place	1963 Rocourt	Team pursuit
Bronze medal – third place	1965 San Sebastián	Individual pursuit

Preben Isaksson (22 January 1943 – 27 December 2008) was a Danish cyclist. He won a bronze medal in the 4000 m individual pursuit at the 1964 Summer Olympics, and placed fifth with a team.

In 1961 Isaksson won the national pursuit title and reached the quarter-finals at the world championships. He won two team medals at the world championships in 1962–63 and an individual bronze medal in 1965; in 1964 he crashed during a qualification round. He retired in 1967 with a tally of seven national pursuit titles.
