= 1964 Olympics =

1964 Olympics refers to both:

- The 1964 Winter Olympics, which were held in Innsbruck, Austria
- The 1964 Summer Olympics, which were held in Tokyo, Japan
