= Jan Ingstrup-Mikkelsen =

Danish cyclist (born 1944)

Personal information
- Born: 25 February 1944 (age 82) Helsingør, Denmark
- Height: 180 cm (5 ft 11 in)
- Weight: 71 kg (157 lb)

Cycling career
- Sport: Cycling

Jan Ingstrup-Mikkelsen (born 25 February 1944) is a Danish former cyclist. He competed in the 1000m time trial and the team pursuit at the 1964 Summer Olympics. Husband of Jette Andersen.
