= Johan Bontekoe =

Dutch swimmer (1943–2006)

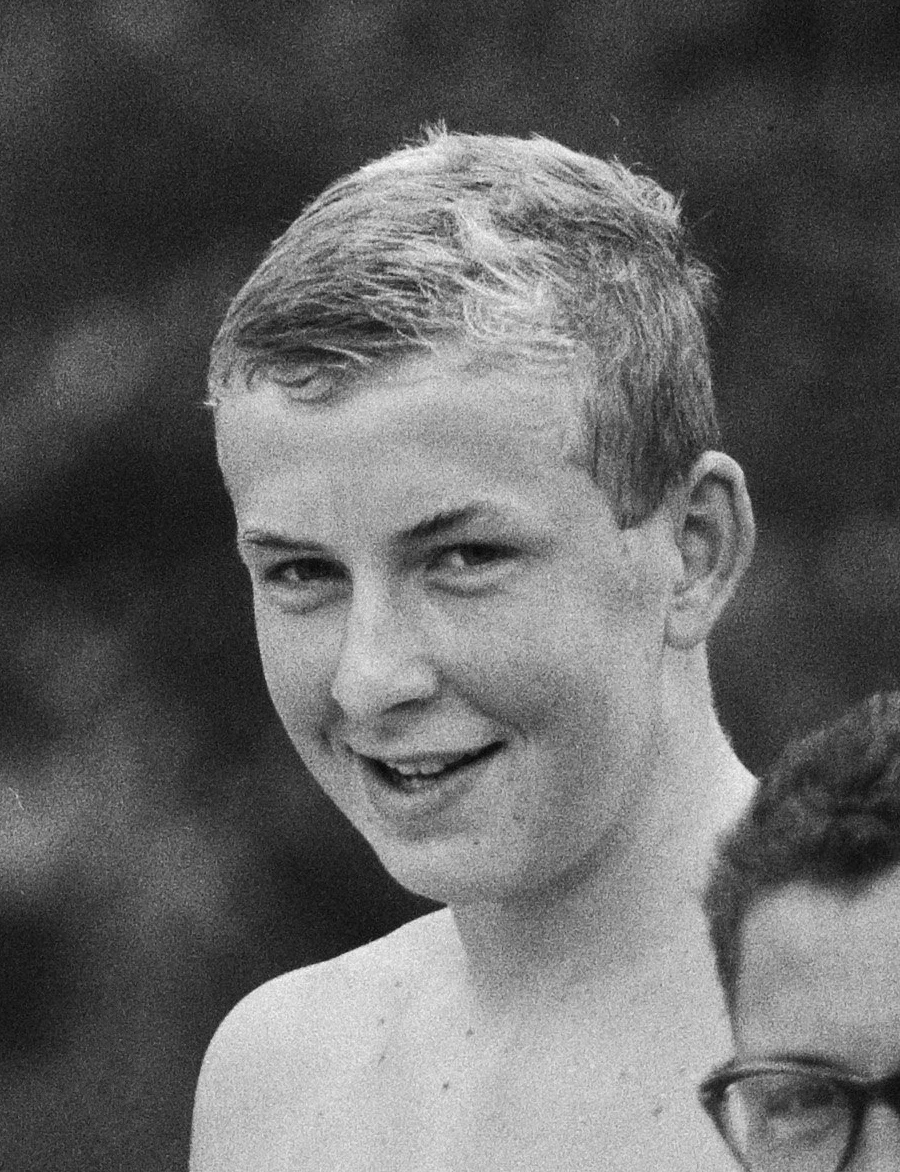
- Johan Bontekoe in 1960

Personal information
- Born: 1 July 1943 Assen, the Netherlands
- Died: 25 March 2006 (aged 62) Amsterdam, the Netherlands
- Height: 1.93 m (6 ft 4 in)
- Weight: 89 kg (196 lb)

Sport
- Sport: Swimming
- Club: HPC, Heemstede
Medal record
Representing the Netherlands
European Championships
Gold medal – first place	1962 Leipzig	400 m freestyle

Johan Bontekoe (1 July 1943 – 25 March 2006) was a Dutch freestyle swimmer who won a gold medal in the 400 meter event at the 1962 European Aquatics Championships. This was the second ever European gold medal for a Dutch male swimmer after 1938 (Kees Hoving). He also competed in the 1964 Summer Olympics but failed to reach the finals. Meanwhile, he was the leading middle and long-distance freestyle swimmer in the Netherlands, winning almost all 200–1500 m events and setting 28 national records between 1960 and 1964. After retiring, he worked in a bank, but also remained associated with the Dutch swimming federation. He suffered from ill health in his last years, and died of pneumonia at the age 62.
