= Jan van der Hoek =

Dutch volleyball player (1940–2018)

Personal information
- Nationality: Dutch
- Born: 14 February 1940 Dordrecht, Netherlands
- Died: 2018 (aged 77–78)

Sport
- Sport: Volleyball

Jan van der Hoek (14 February 1940 – 2018) was a Dutch volleyball player. He competed in the men's tournament at the 1964 Summer Olympics.
