= Jacques de Vink =

Dutch volleyball player (born 1942)

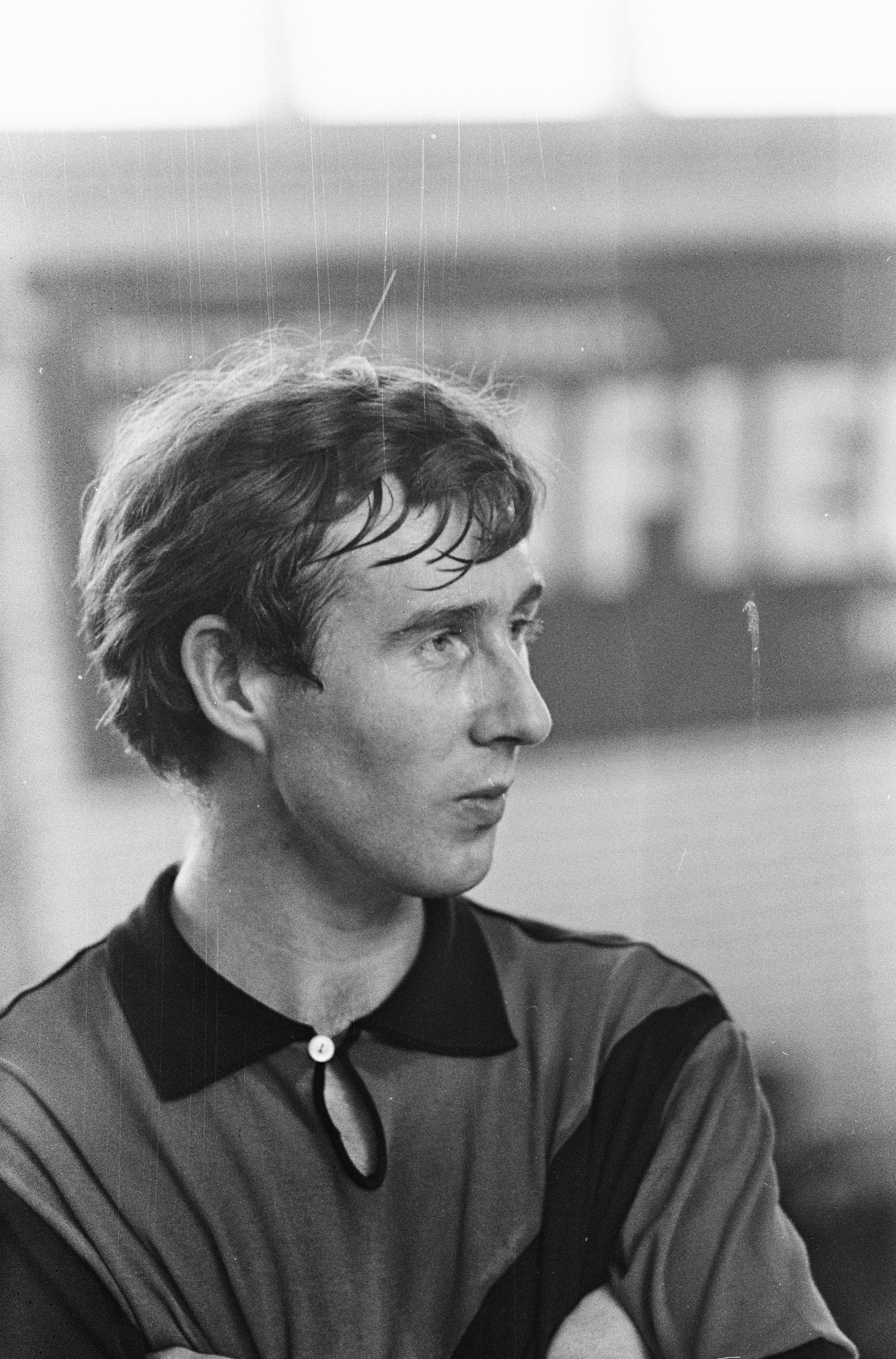
- Jacques de Vink in 1966

Personal information
- Nationality: Dutch
- Born: 15 June 1942 (age 82); Leiden, Netherlands

Sport
- Sport: Volleyball

Jacques de Vink (born 15 June 1942) is a Dutch volleyball player. He competed in the men's tournament at the 1964 Summer Olympics.
