= Christian Cuch =

French cyclist

Personal information
- Born: 25 October 1943 Castillon-de-Castets, France
- Died: 17 August 2014 (aged 70)

Cycling career
- Sport: Cycling

Christian Cuch (25 October 1943 – 17 August 2014) was a former French cyclist. He competed in the team pursuit at the 1964 Summer Olympics.
