= Joop van Domselaar =

Dutch sports shooter

Personal information
- Born: 11 September 1928 Driebergen, Netherlands
- Died: 11 November 2006 (aged 78) Driebergen, Netherlands

Sport
- Sport: Sports shooting

Joop van Domselaar (11 September 1928 – 11 November 2006) was a Dutch sports shooter. He competed in two events at the 1964 Summer Olympics.
