= Hans van Wijnen =

Dutch volleyball player (1937–1995)

Personal information
- Nationality: Dutch
- Born: 30 December 1937; Voorburg, Netherlands
- Died: 25 January 1995 (aged 57); Sneek, Netherlands

Sport
- Sport: Volleyball

Hans van Wijnen (30 December 1937 – 25 January 1995) was a Dutch volleyball player. He competed in the men's tournament at the 1964 Summer Olympics.
