= Flemming Hansen (cyclist) =

Danish cyclist

Personal information
- Born: 11 February 1944 (age 82) Køge, Denmark

Cycling career
- Sport: Cycling

Flemming Hansen (born 11 February 1944) is a Danish former cyclist. He competed in the individual road race and team time trial events at the 1964 Summer Olympics.
