= Giorgio Ursi =

Italian cyclist (1942–1982)

Personal information
- Full name: Giorgio Ursi
- Born: 1 September 1942 Doberdò del Lago, Italy
- Died: 8 October 1982 (aged 39) Trieste, Italy

Cycling career
- Sport: Cycling
- Discipline: Track
- Role: Rider
Medal record
Men's track cycling
Representing Italy
Olympic Games
Silver medal – second place	1964 Tokyo	Individual pursuit

Giorgio Ursi (1 September 1942 – 8 October 1982) was a racing cyclist from Italy. He was of Slovene ethnicity, and was also known as Jurij Uršič.

He competed for Italy at the 1964 Summer Olympics held in Tokyo, Japan in the Individual pursuit event where he finished in second place.
