= Rob Groenhuyzen =

Dutch volleyball player (born 1941)

Personal information
- Nationality: Dutch
- Born: 4 March 1941 (age 85) Rotterdam, Netherlands

Sport
- Sport: Volleyball

Rob Groenhuyzen (born 4 March 1941) is a Dutch volleyball player. He competed in the men's tournament at the 1964 Summer Olympics. He spent three years in prison for politically motivated vandalism.
