= Antonín Kříž (cyclist) =

Czech cyclist

Personal information
- Born: 29 October 1943 Prague, Protectorate of Bohemia and Moravia
- Died: 11 July 2022 (aged 78) Písek, Czech Republic
- Height: 181 cm (5 ft 11 in)
- Weight: 75 kg (165 lb)

Cycling career
- Sport: Cycling

Antonín Kříž (29 October 1943 - 11 July 2022) was a former Czech cyclist. He competed in the team pursuit at the 1964 Summer Olympics.
