= Leonid Kolumbet =

Soviet cyclist

Personal information
- Full name: Leonid Fedorovych Kolumbet; Леонід Федорович Колумбет
- Born: 14 October 1937 Horenychi, Kiev Oblast, Ukrainian SSR, USSR
- Died: 2 May 1983 (aged 45)
- Height: 5 ft 10 in (178 cm)
- Weight: 172 lb (78 kg)

Cycling career
- Sport: Cycling
- Current team: Retired
- Discipline: Track cycling
- Role: Rider
Medal record
Representing Soviet Union
Men's track cycling
Olympic Games
Bronze medal – third place	1960 Rome	4000 m team pursuit
World Championships
Bronze medal – third place	1962 Milan	4000 m team pursuit
Gold medal – first place	1963 Rocourt	4000 m team pursuit
Bronze medal – third place	1964 Paris	4000 m team pursuit

Leonid Fedorovych Kolumbet (14 October 1937 – 2 May 1983) was a Soviet track cyclist. Competing in the 4,000 m team pursuit he won a world title in 1963 and bronze medals at the 1960 Olympics and 1962 and 1964 world championships.

Kolumbet was Jewish. His brother Mykola Kolumbet was an Olympic road cyclist.
