= Joseph Pare =

French cyclist

Personal information
- Born: 30 December 1943 (age 82)
- Died: Lamothe-Montravel, France

Cycling career
- Sport: Cycling

Joseph Pare (born 30 December 1943) is a former French cyclist. He competed in the team pursuit at the 1964 Summer Olympics.
