= Jan Oosterbaan =

Dutch volleyball player

Personal information
- Nationality: Dutch
- Born: 10 November 1937 (age 87); Voorburg, Netherlands

Sport
- Sport: Volleyball

Jan Oosterbaan (born 10 November 1937) is a Dutch volleyball player. He competed in the men's tournament at the 1964 Summer Olympics.
