= Hemmie Vriens =

Dutch swimmer

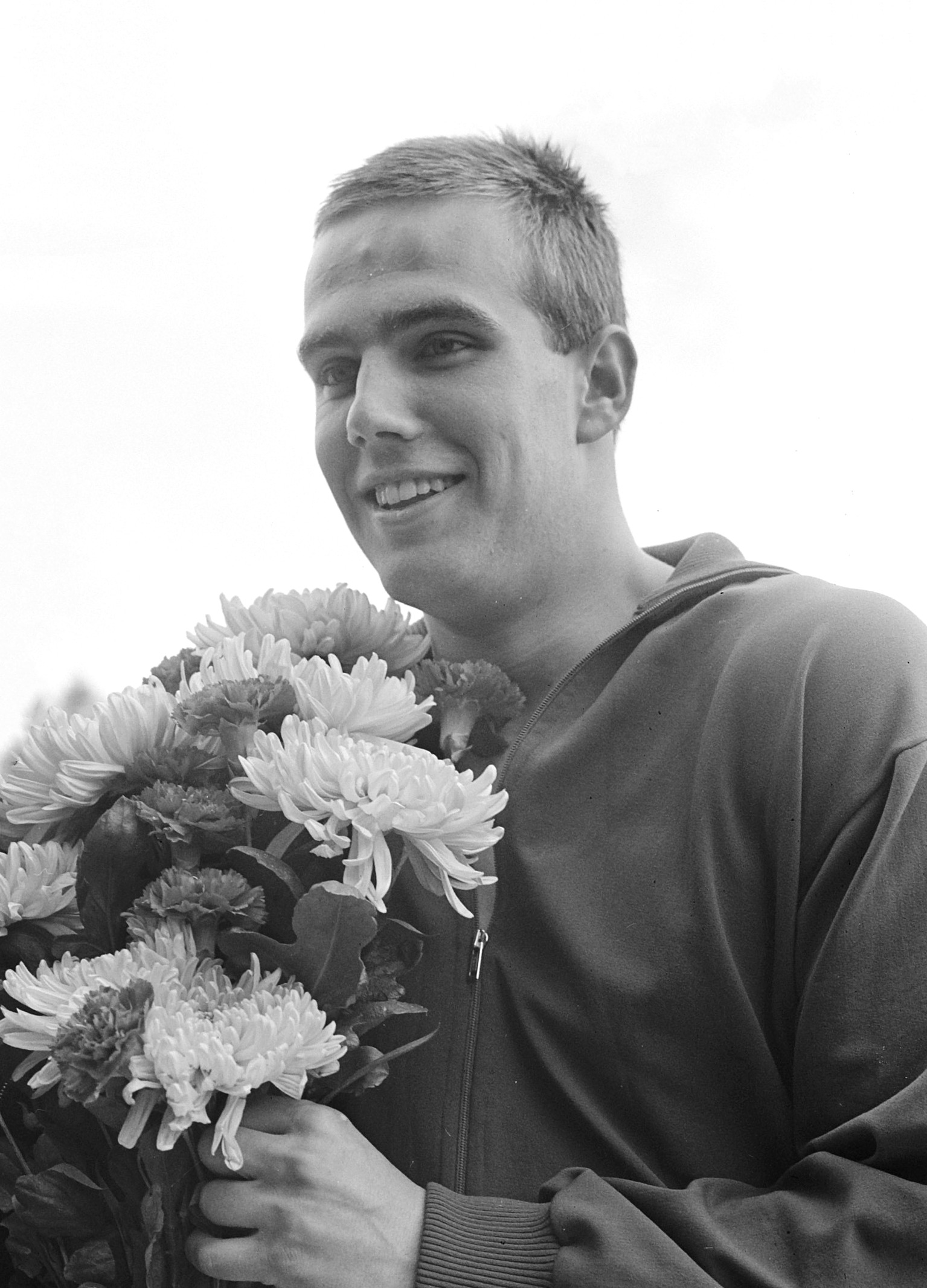
- Hemmie Vriens in 1964

Personal information
- Born: 10 June 1944 (age 82) Breda, the Netherlands
- Height: 1.90 m (6 ft 3 in)
- Weight: 90 kg (200 lb)

Sport
- Sport: Swimming
- Club: Surae, Breda

Hermanus Siert Adolf "Hemmie" Vriens (born 10 June 1944) is a retired Dutch swimmer. He competed at the 1964 Summer Olympics in the 200 m breaststroke and 4 × 100 m medley relay but failed to reach the finals.
