= Francis Bazire =

French cyclist (1939–2022)

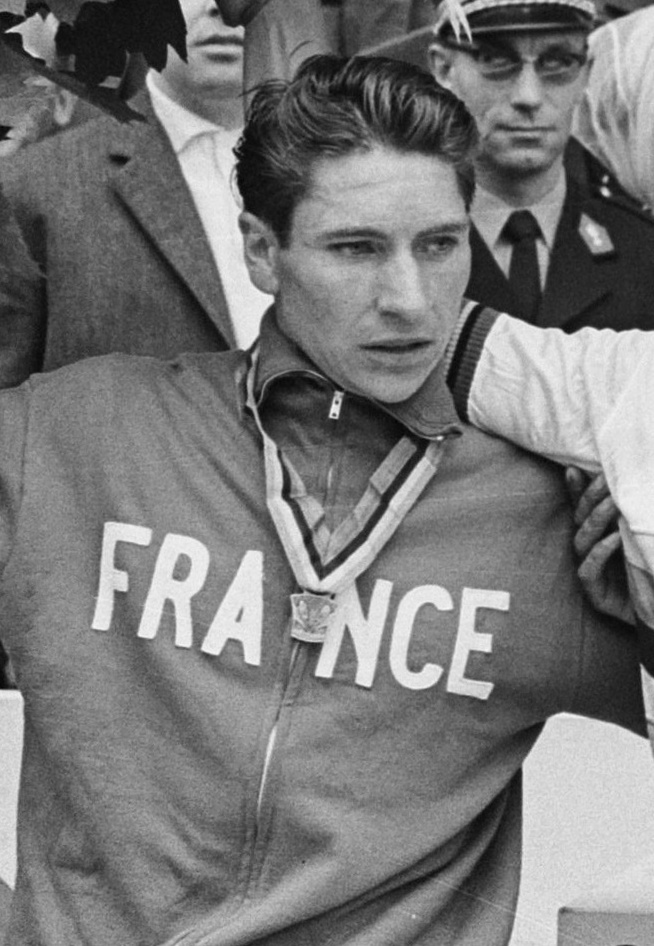
- Bazire at the 1963 UCI Road World Championships

Personal information
- Born: 17 April 1939 Écalles-Alix, France
- Died: 16 January 2022 (aged 82)
- Height: 1.69 m (5 ft 7 in)

Cycling career
- Sport: Cycling
Medal record
Representing France
Men's road bicycle racing
World Championships
Silver medal – second place	1963 Renaix	Amateur's Road Race

Francis Augustin Bazire (17 April 1939 – 16 January 2022) was a French cyclist. He won a silver medal in the amateur road race at the 1963 UCI Road World Championships. Next year he competed at the 1964 Summer Olympics and finished in 53rd place in the same event.
