= Bert Sitters =

Dutch swimmer (1941–2022)

Bertus "Bert" Sitters (10 December 1941 – 13 November 2022) was a Dutch swimmer and swimming coach. He competed at the 1960 Summer Olympics in the 200 m butterfly and at the 1964 Summer Olympics in the 100 m freestyle and 4 × 200 m freestyle relay, but failed to reach finals in all events.

After retiring from competition, in 1967–1972 and 1982–1986 he worked as a swimming and waterpolo coach in Spain. During 1972–1982 and 1986–1989 he trained the Dutch national team, preparing it for the 1976, 1980, 1984 and 1988 Olympics as well as world and European championships. Since 1989 he was a TV commentator of aquatic events with Eurosport.
