= Alberto Trillo =

Argentine cyclist

Personal information
- Born: 19 March 1939 (age 87) Buenos Aires, Argentina

Cycling career
- Sport: Cycling

Alberto Trillo (born 19 March 1939) is an Argentine former cyclist. He competed at the 1960 Summer Olympics and the 1964 Summer Olympics.
