= Jurjaan Koolen =

Dutch volleyball player (1938–2020)

Personal information
- Full name: Jurjaan Christiaan Koolen
- Nationality: Dutch
- Born: 20 September 1938; Monnickendam, Netherlands
- Died: 23 June 2020 (aged 81)

Sport
- Sport: Volleyball

Jurjaan Christiaan Koolen (20 September 1938 – 23 June 2020) was a Dutch volleyball player. He competed in the men's tournament at the 1964 Summer Olympics.
