= Jiří Pecka (cyclist) =

Czechoslovak cyclist

Personal information
- Born: 6 October 1940 Brno, Protectorate of Bohemia and Moravia
- Died: 2021 (aged 80–81)
- Height: 179 cm (5 ft 10 in)
- Weight: 74 kg (163 lb)

Cycling career
- Sport: Cycling

Jiří Pecka (6 October 1940 – 2021) was a Czechoslovak cyclist. He competed in the 1000m time trial and team pursuit events at the 1964 Summer Olympics.
