= Vinus van Baalen =

Dutch swimmer (1942 - 2012)

Personal information
- Full name: Levinus Willem van Baalen
- Born: 1 July 1942 Dinxperlo, Netherlands
- Died: 21 August 2012 (aged 70) Edmonton, Alberta, Canada

Sport
- Sport: Swimming

Vinus van Baalen (1 July 1942 – 21 August 2012) was a Dutch swimmer. He competed in two events at the 1964 Summer Olympics.
