= Frank Constandse =

Dutch volleyball player

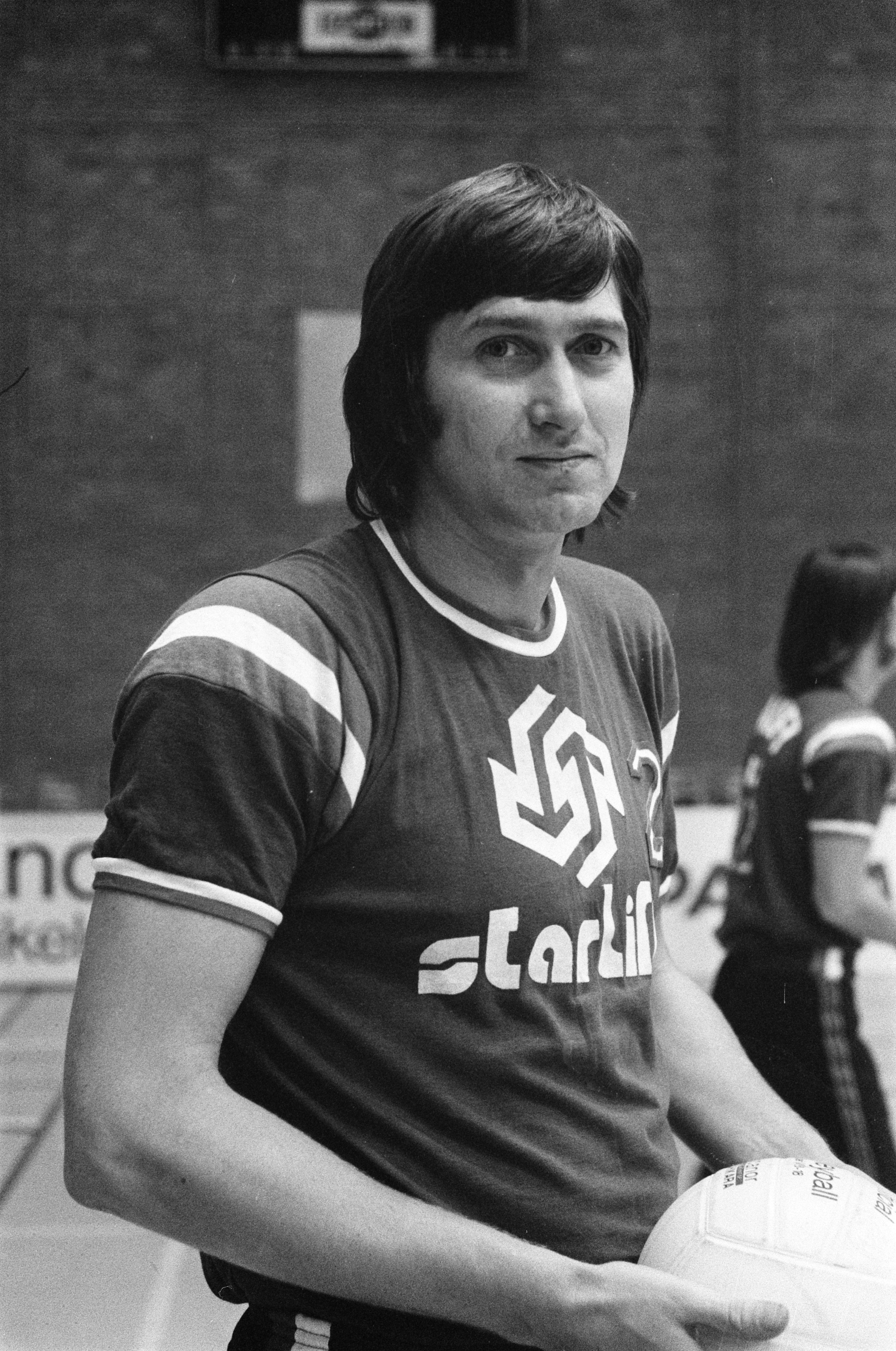
- Frank Constandse in 1974

Personal information
- Born: 31 May 1946 (age 80) Voorburg, the Netherlands
- Height: 1.92 m (6 ft 4 in)
- Weight: 76 kg (168 lb)

Sport
- Sport: Volleyball
- Club: DES, Voorburg

Franklin Louis "Frank" Constandse (born 31 May 1945 or 1946) is a retired volleyball player from the Netherlands. He was part of the Dutch team that finished in eighth place at the 1964 Summer Olympics.
