= Jiří Daler =

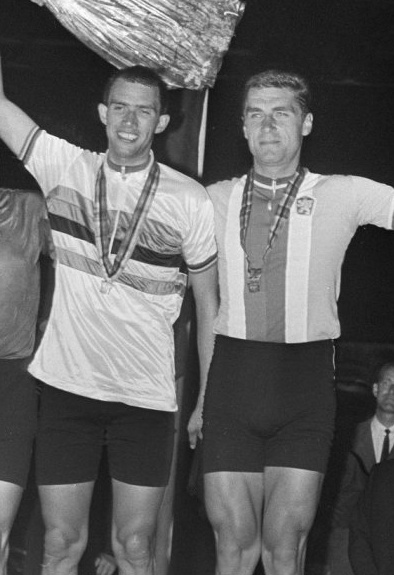
- Gert Bongers and Jiří Daler (right) at the 1967 World Championships

Personal information
- Born: 8 March 1940 (age 86) Brno, Protectorate of Bohemia and Moravia
- Height: 1.83 m (6 ft 0 in)
- Weight: 85 kg (187 lb)

Sport
- Sport: Track cycling
- Club: Dukla Bratislava
Medal record
Representing Czechoslovakia
Olympic Games
Gold medal – first place	1964 Tokyo	Individual pursuit
World championships
Bronze medal – third place	1964 Paris	Individual pursuit
Bronze medal – third place	1965 San Sebastian	Team pursuit
Silver medal – second place	1966 Frankfurt	Individual pursuit
Bronze medal – third place	1966 Frankfurt	Team pursuit
Bronze medal – third place	1967 Amsterdam	Individual pursuit

Jiří Daler (born 8 March 1940) is a retired cyclist from Czechoslovakia. His sporting career began with Dukla Brno. As an amateur track cyclist he competed at the 1964 and 1968 Summer Olympics in five events in total. In the 4000 m individual pursuit, he won a gold medal in 1964 and finished in 14th place in 1968; in both Games he finished fifth in the team pursuit. Between 1964 and 1967 he won one silver and four bronze medals in the individual and team pursuit events at the world championships. In 1967, he also set two world records, in the 4000 m and 5000 m sprint. He then became a professional road racer and finished four times within the podium in 1968–1969: in Saint-Aigulin (1968), La Bastide d'Armagnac (1968), Saint-Raphael (1969) and Tour de l'Herault (1969).

== Major results ==
1964
1st Individual pursuit, Olympic Games
