= Carlo Rancati =

Italian cyclist (1940–2012)

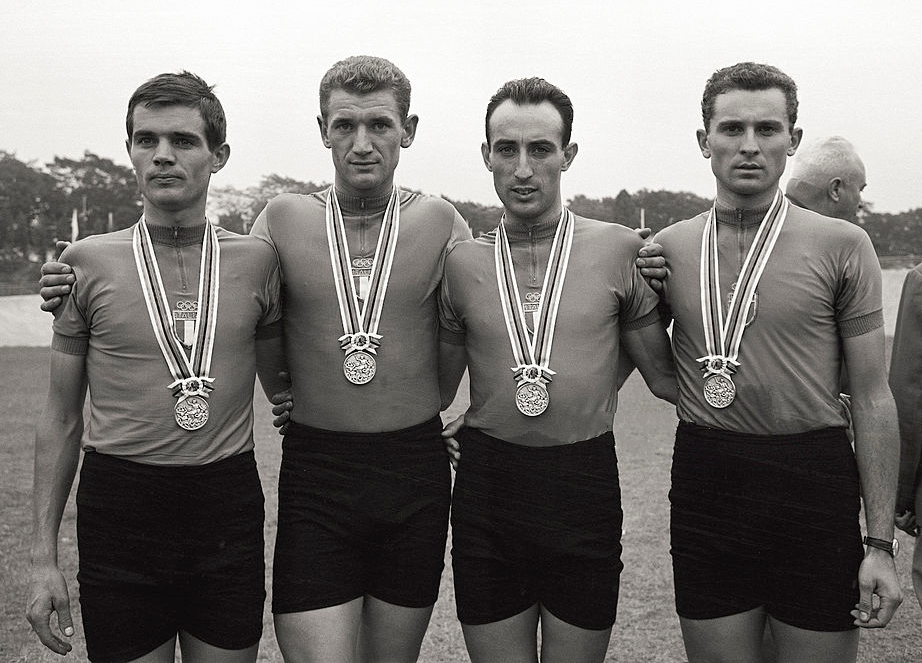
- Carlo Rancati (right) at the 1964 Olympics

Personal information
- Born: 28 April 1940 Milan, Italy
- Died: 22 November 2012 (aged 72)
- Height: 1.75 m (5 ft 9 in)
- Weight: 74 kg (163 lb)

Cycling career
- Sport: Cycling
Medal record
Representing Italy
Men's track cycling
Olympic Games
Silver medal – second place	1964 Tokyo	Team pursuit
World championships
Silver medal – second place	1964 Paris	Team pursuit

Carlo Rancati (28 April 1940 – 22 November 2012) was an Italian cyclist. Competing as an amateur track racer, he won silver medals at the 1964 Summer Olympics and at the 1964 Track Cycling World Championships both in the team pursuit. He then became a professional road racer, but with little success.
