= František Řezáč (cyclist) =

Czech cyclist

Personal information
- Born: 1 January 1943 Prague, Protectorate of Bohemia and Moravia
- Died: 4 May 1979 (aged 36)

Cycling career
- Sport: Cycling

František Řezáč (1 January 1943 – 4 May 1979) was a Czech cyclist. He competed at the 1964 Summer Olympics and the 1968 Summer Olympics.
