= Karl Link =

German cyclist (born 1942)

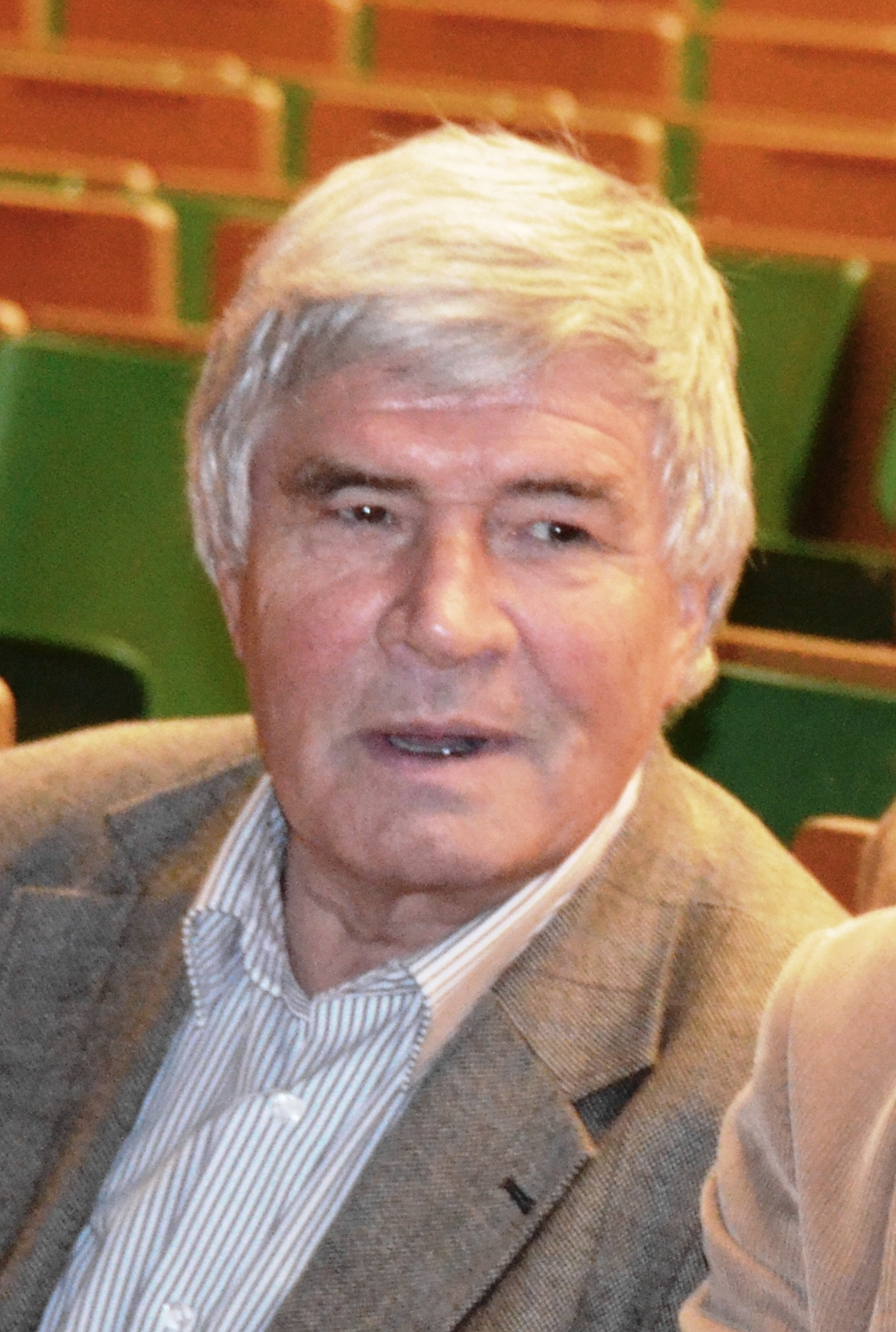
- Link in 2012

Personal information
- Full name: Karl Link
- Born: 27 July 1942 (age 84) Herrenberg, Nazi Germany

Cycling career
- Sport: Cycling
- Discipline: Track
- Role: Rider
- Rider type: Sprinter
Medal record
Men's track cycling
Olympic Games
Representing Germany
Gold medal – first place	1964 Tokyo	Team pursuit
Representing West Germany
Silver medal – second place	1968 Mexico City	Team pursuit

Karl Link (born 27 July 1942) is a German racing cyclist. Together with his teammates he won the gold medal in the team pursuit at the 1964 Summer Olympics in Tokyo and the silver medal at the 1968 Summer Olympics in Mexico City.
