= Bent Hansen (cyclist) =

Danish cyclist

Personal information
- Born: 21 October 1932 (age 93) Copenhagen, Denmark

Cycling career
- Sport: Cycling

Bent Hansen (21 October 1932 – 5 May 2022) was a Danish former cyclist. He competed in the team pursuit event at the 1964 Summer Olympics.
