= Lothar Claesges =

German cyclist (1942–2021)

Personal information
- Born: 3 July 1942 Krefeld, Germany
- Died: 12 November 2021 (aged 79) Krefeld, Germany

Cycling career
- Sport: Cycling
Medal record
Representing Germany
Men's cycling
Olympic Games
Gold medal – first place	1964 Tokyo	Team pursuit

Lothar Claesges (3 July 1942 – 12 November 2021) was a German cyclist. He won the gold medal in the Men's team pursuit at the 1964 Summer Olympics. He died on 12 November 2021, at the age of 79.
