= Kjell Rodian =

Danish cyclist

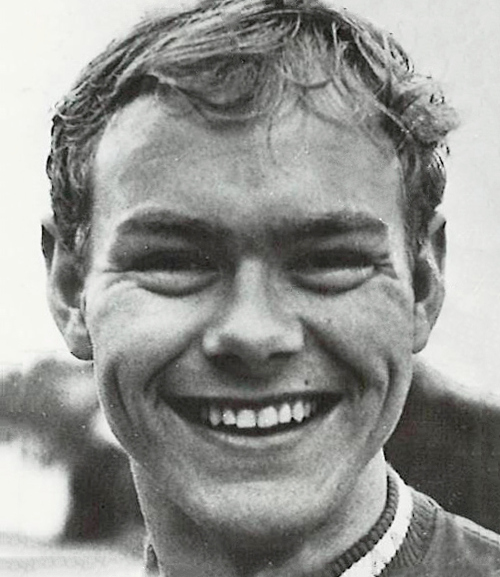
- Rodian in 1964

Personal information
- Full name: Kjell Åkerstrøm Hansen Rodian
- Born: 30 June 1942 Frederiksberg, Denmark
- Died: 29 December 2007 (aged 65) Copenhagen, Denmark
- Height: 179 cm (5 ft 10 in)
- Weight: 73 kg (161 lb)

Cycling career
- Sport: Cycling

Amateur team
- ABC, København
Medal record
Men's cycling
Representing Denmark
Olympic Games
| Silver medal – second place | 1964 Tokyo | Individual road race |

Kjell Åkerstrøm Hansen Rodian (30 June 1942 – 29 December 2007) was a Danish cyclist who won an individual silver medal in the road race at the 1964 Olympics. After that he semi-retired for nine years, and after returning to cycling rode the Peace Race in 1973–75. He also placed second-third at the national championships in 1974, both on the road and on track.
