= Sergey Tereshchenkov =

Soviet cyclist

Personal information
- Born: 27 April 1938 Smolensk, Russian SFSR, Soviet Union
- Died: 11 April 2006 (aged 67)
- Height: 178 cm (5 ft 10 in)
- Weight: 80 kg (176 lb)

Cycling career
- Sport: Cycling

Sergey Tereshchenkov (27 April 1938 – 11 April 2006) was a Soviet cyclist. He competed in the team pursuit at the 1964 Summer Olympics.
