= Hachioji Velodrome =

Velodrome in the Hachiōji, Tokyo, Japan

Coordinates: 35.649354°N 139.288745°E

Hachioji Velodrome (八王子自転車競技場, Hachiōji Jitenshakyōgijō) was a temporary velodrome located in the Hachiōji, Tokyo area. Constructed between March and August 1964, it hosted the track cycling events for the 1964 Summer Olympics. The site of the velodrome was later converted to a public park called Ryonan Park.

== See also ==
- List of cycling tracks and velodromes
