= Kurt vid Stein =

Danish cyclist (1935–2022)

Personal information
- Born: 17 November 1935 Copenhagen, Denmark
- Died: 22 July 2022 (aged 86)

Cycling career
- Sport: Cycling

Kurt vid Stein (17 November 1935 – 22 July 2022) was a Danish cyclist. He competed at the 1960 Summer Olympics and the 1964 Summer Olympics.

Vid Stein died on 22 July 2022, at the age of 86.
