= Ernst Streng =

German cyclist

Personal information
- Born: 24 January 1942 Cologne, Germany
- Died: 27 March 1993 (aged 51) Cologne, Germany
- Height: 175 cm (5 ft 9 in)
- Weight: 67 kg (148 lb)

Cycling career
- Sport: Cycling

Professional team
- RC Schmitter, Cologne
Medal record
Representing Germany
Men's track cycling
Olympic Games
Gold medal – first place	1964 Tokyo	Men's team pursuit

Ernst Streng (25 January 1942 – 27 March 1993) was a German cyclist. He competed in the Men's team pursuit at the 1964 Summer Olympics where he won a gold medal.
