= Gerard Koel =

Dutch cyclist (born 1941)

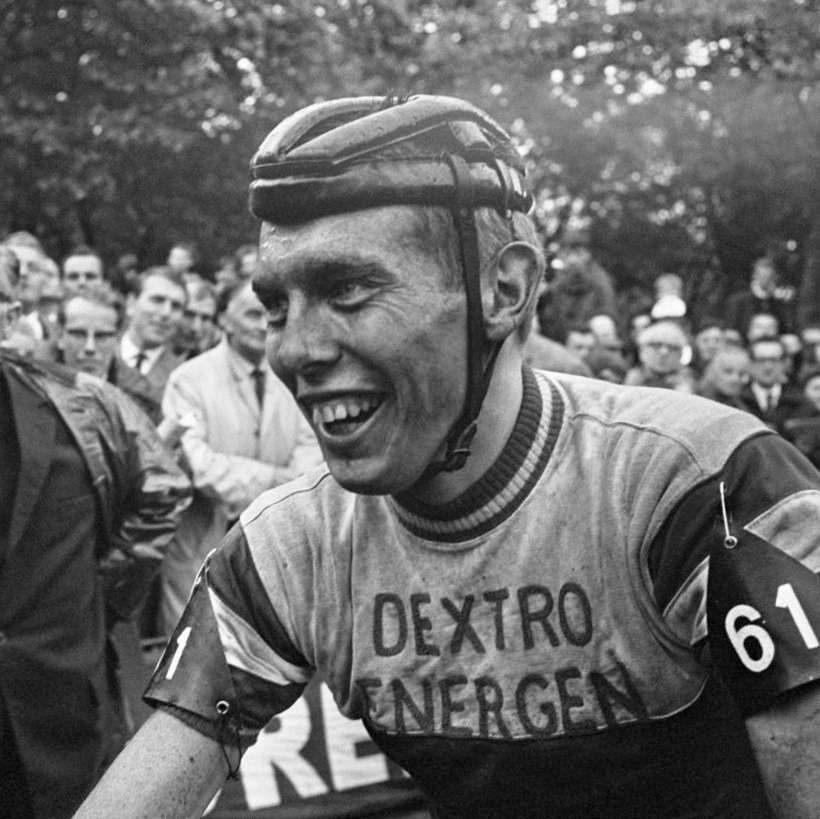
- Gerard Koel at the Olympia's Tour in 1965

Personal information
- Born: 16 January 1941 (age 85) Amsterdam, the Netherlands
- Height: 1.79 m (5 ft 10 in)
- Weight: 67 kg (148 lb)

Sport
- Sport: Cycling
Medal record
Representing Netherlands
Olympic Games
| Bronze medal – third place | 1964 Tokyo | Team pursuit |

Gerard Koel (born 16 January 1941) is a retired Dutch cyclist who was active between 1962 and 1973. He won a bronze medal in the 4 km team pursuit at the 1964 Summer Olympics. In 1966 he turned professional and won two six-day races: in Madrid in 1967 and in Amsterdam in 1973, as well as one stage of the Olympia's Tour in 1965. Nationally he earned titles in the sprint (1968 and 1969) and scratch in 1970. After retiring from competitions he worked as a driver for Dutch television during the Tour de France.

== See also ==
- List of Dutch Olympic cyclists
