= Tiemen Groen =

Dutch cyclist (1946–2021)

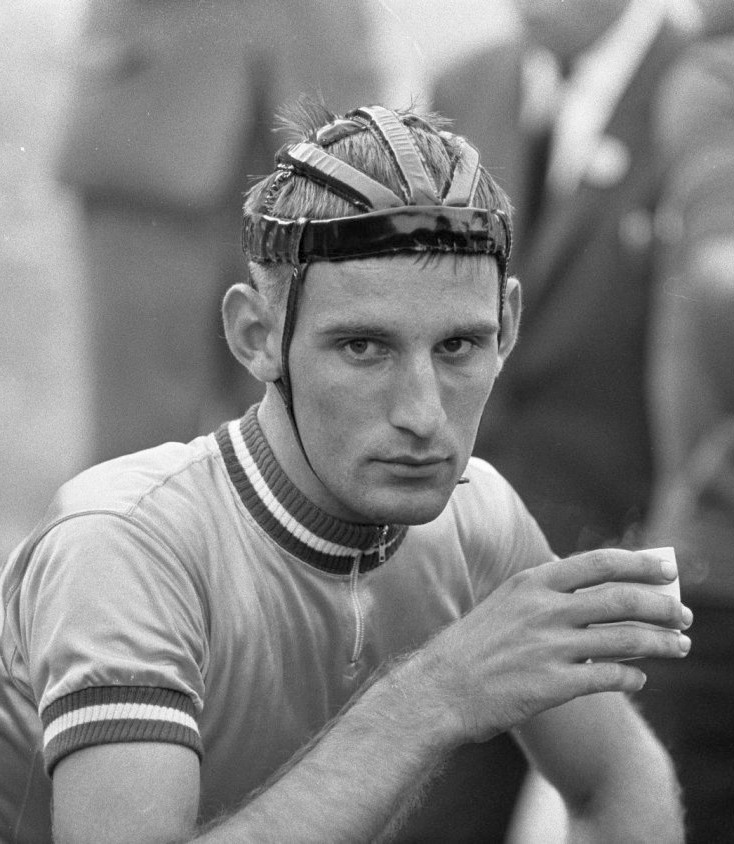
- Groen in 1967

Personal information
- Born: 6 July 1946 Follega, Netherlands
- Died: 26 October 2021 (aged 75)
- Height: 1.85 m (6 ft 1 in)
- Weight: 85 kg (187 lb)

Sport
- Sport: Cycling
Medal record
Representing the Netherlands
UCI Track Cycling World Championships
Gold medal – first place	1964 Paris	Individual pursuit, amateurs
Gold medal – first place	1965 San Sebastián	Individual pursuit, amateurs
Gold medal – first place	1966 Frankfurt	Individual pursuit, amateurs
Gold medal – first place	1967 Amsterdam	Individual pursuit, professionals
UCI Road World Championships
Silver medal – second place	1966 Nürburgring	Team time trial

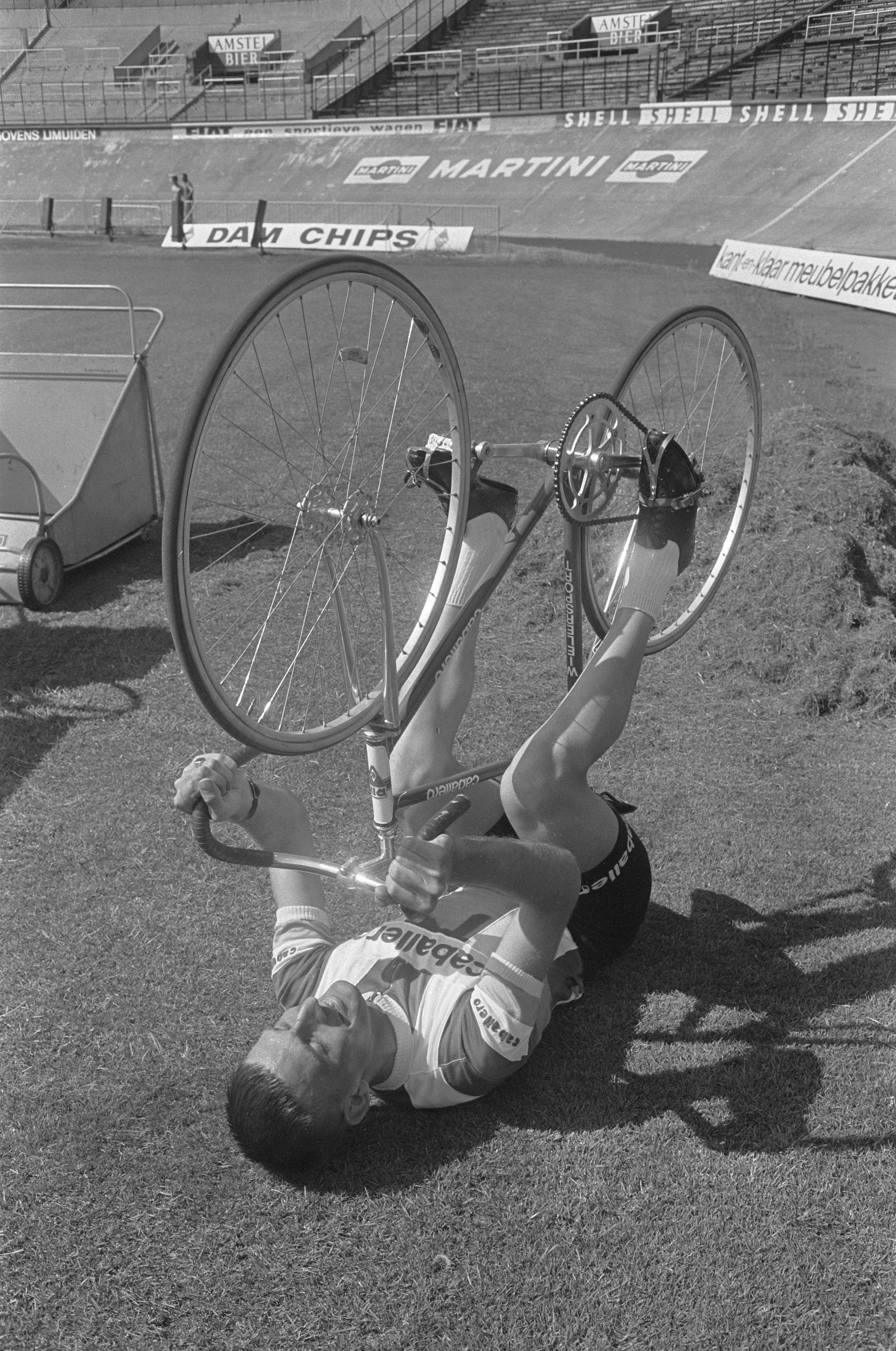
Tiemen Groen "riding" on his back in 1967

Tiemen Groen (6 July 1946 – 26 October 2021) was a Dutch cyclist who won four consecutive world titles in the 4 km individual pursuit in 1964–1967; His sporting career began with DTS Zaandam. He finished fourth in this event at the 1964 Summer Olympics. He also won a silver medal in the team time trial at the 1966 UCI Road World Championships. He retired shortly after turning professional in 1967.

Groen moved in 1995 to South Africa. He died on 26 October 2021, at the age of 75.
