= Jaap Oudkerk =

Dutch cyclist (1937–2024)

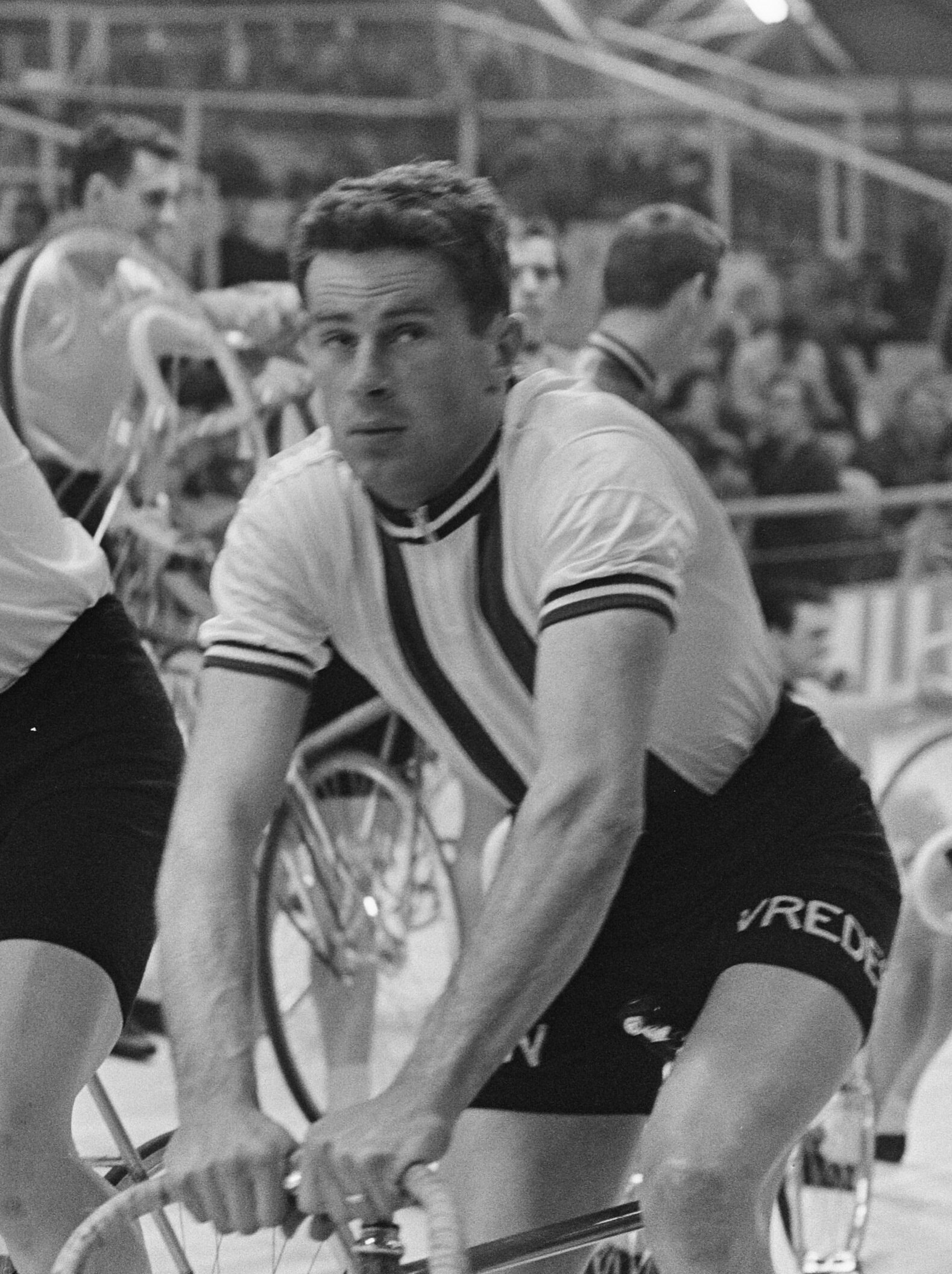
- Oudkerk in 1966

Personal information
- Born: 2 August 1937 Landsmeer, Netherlands
- Died: 17 February 2024 (aged 86) Almere, Netherlands
- Height: 1.80 m (5 ft 11 in)
- Weight: 69 kg (152 lb)

Sport
- Sport: Cycling
Medal record
Representing the Netherlands
Olympic Games
Bronze medal – third place	1964 Tokyo	Team pursuit
Motor-paced World Championships
Gold medal – first place	1964 Paris	Amateurs
Bronze medal – third place	1965 San Sebastian	Professionals
Gold medal – first place	1969 Brno	Professionals
Silver medal – second place	1971 Varese	Professionals

Jacob "Jaap" Oudkerk (2 August 1937 – 17 February 2024) was a Dutch cyclist. He competed in the 4000 m team pursuit at the 1960 and 1964 Summer Olympics and finished in fifth and third place, respectively.

Oudkerk was also active in motor-paced racing. After winning the world championships in the amateurs category in 1964 he turned professional and won three more world championship medals, including a gold in 1969.

Oudkerk was the husband of Marianne Heemskerk, a Dutch Olympic swimmer. Jaap Oudkerk died on 17 February 2024, at the age of 86.

== See also ==
- List of Dutch Olympic cyclists
