= Fencing at the 1972 Summer Olympics – Women's foil =

Fencing at the Olympics

Women's foil at the Games of the XX Olympiad
- Venue: Exhibition Halls 12 & 20
- Dates: 2 – 3 September 1972
- Competitors: 44 from 20 nations

Medalists
1st place, gold medalist(s)		Antonella Ragno-Lonzi	Italy
2nd place, silver medalist(s)		Ildikó Farkasinszky-Bóbis	Hungary
3rd place, bronze medalist(s)		Galina Gorokhova	Soviet Union

The women's foil was one of eight fencing events on the fencing at the 1972 Summer Olympics programme. It was the eleventh appearance of the event. The competition was held from 2 to 3 September 1972. 44 fencers from 20 nations competed.

== Results ==
=== Round 1 ===
==== Round 1 Pool A ====
Pos	Fencer	W	L	TF	TA	Qual.	AZ	MM	MCDD	MI	HK	WPR
1	Aleksandra Zabelina (URS)	4	1	18	10	Q		4–1	2–4	4–2	4–1	4–2
2	Max Madsen (DEN)	3	2	15	12	Q	1–4		4–2	2–4	4–1	4–1
3	Marie-Chantal Depetris-Demaille (FRA)	2	3	16	14	Q	4–2	2–4		3–4	3–4	4–0
4	Marlene Infante (CUB)	2	3	15	17		2–4	4–2	4–3		3–4	2–4
5	Harriet King (USA)	2	3	13	18		1–4	1–4	4–3	4–3		3–4
6	Waltraut Peck-Repa (AUT)	2	3	11	17		2–4	1–4	0–4	4–2	4–3	

Source: Official Report, vol. 3, p. 277

==== Round 1 Pool B ====
Pos	Fencer	W	L	TF	TA	Qual.	IB	SG	ISUR	OOS	MEG
1	Irmela Broniecki (FRG)	3	1	14	8	Q		2–4	4–3	4–0	4–1
2	Sue Green (GBR)	3	1	14	11	Q	4–2		4–2	2–4	4–3
3	Ildikó Ságiné Ujlakyné Rejtő (HUN)	2	2	13	10	Q	3–4	2–4		4–1	4–1
4	Olga Orban-Szabo (ROU)	2	2	9	11		0–4	4–2	1–4		4–1
5	María Esther García (CUB)	0	4	6	16		1–4	3–4	1–4	1–4	

Source: Official Report, vol. 3, p. 277

==== Round 1 Pool C ====
Pos	Fencer	W	L	TF	TA	Qual.	IFB	BGD	ClC	ADEP	HH
1	Ildikó Farkasinszky-Bóbis (HUN)	3	1	13	6	Q		1–4	4–1	4–1	4–0
2	Brigitte Gapais-Dumont (FRA)	3	1	14	9	Q	4–1		4–3	2–4	4–1
3	Claudine le Comte (BEL)	2	2	12	10	Q	1–4	3–4		4–1	4–1
4	Ana Derșidan-Ene-Pascu (ROU)	2	2	10	12		1–4	4–2	1–4		4–2
5	Hannelore Hradez (AUT)	0	4	4	16		0–4	1–4	1–4	2–4	

Source: Official Report, vol. 3, p. 277

==== Round 1 Pool D ====
Pos	Fencer	W	L	TF	TA	Qual.	CRC	KLR	MS	ME	KS	SISM
1	Cathérine Rousselet-Ceretti (FRA)	4	1	19	13	Q		4–3	3–4	4–3	4–1	4–2
2	Katarína Lokšová-Ráczová (TCH)	3	2	18	11	Q	3–4		4–0	3–4	4–1	4–2
3	Mária Szolnoki (HUN)	3	2	13	14	Q	4–3	0–4		4–3	1–4	4–0
4	Marion Exelby (AUS)	2	3	16	17		3–4	4–3	3–4		2–4	4–2
5	Kamilla Składanowska (POL)	2	3	11	15		1–4	1–4	4–1	4–2		1–4
6	Sylvia Iannuzzi-San Martín (ARG)	1	4	10	17		2–4	2–4	0–4	2–4	4–1	

Source: Official Report, vol. 3, p. 277

==== Round 1 Pool E ====
Pos	Fencer	W	L	TF	TA	Qual.	GG	IGDJ	GL	ER	DH
1	Galina Gorokhova (URS)	3	1	13	8	Q		4–2	1–4	4–2	4–0
2	Ileana Gyulai-Drîmbă-Jenei (ROU)	3	1	14	10	Q	2–4		4–1	4–2	4–3
3	Giulia Lorenzoni (ITA)	2	2	11	11	Q	4–1	1–4		2–4	4–2
4	Elke Radlingmaier (AUT)	1	3	10	14		2–4	2–4	4–2		2–4
5	Donna Hennyey (CAN)	1	3	9	14		0–4	3–4	2–4	4–2	

Source: Official Report, vol. 3, p. 277

==== Round 1 Pool F ====
Pos	Fencer	W	L	TF	TA	Qual.	KP	EFC	RW	CM	JWY	OE
1	Kerstin Palm (SWE)	5	0	20	8	Q		4–2	4–2	4–2	4–1	4–1
2	Elżbieta Franke-Cymerman (POL)	4	1	18	10	Q	2–4		4–2	4–2	4–2	4–0
3	Ruth White (USA)	2	3	14	14	Q	2–4	2–4		2–4	4–2	4–0
4	Christine McDougall (AUS)	2	3	15	17		2–4	2–4	4–2		3–4	4–3
5	Janet Wardell-Yerburgh (GBR)	2	3	13	17		1–4	2–4	2–4	4–3		4–2
6	Özden Ezinler (TUR)	0	5	6	20		1–4	0–4	0–4	3–4	2–4	

Source: Official Report, vol. 3, p. 277

==== Round 1 Pool G ====
Pos	Fencer	W	L	TF	TA	Qual.	HB	BO	ARL	FR	CH	AO
1	Halina Balon (POL)	5	0	20	9	Q		4–2	4–3	4–0	4–3	4–1
2	Brigitte Oertel (FRG)	3	2	17	13	Q	2–4		4–3	4–2	4–0	3–4
3	Antonella Ragno-Lonzi (ITA)	2	3	15	12	Q	3–4	3–4		4–0	1–4	4–0
4	Fabienne Regamey (SUI)	2	3	10	17		0–4	2–4	0–4		4–3	4–2
5	Clare Henley (GBR)	2	3	14	15		3–4	0–4	4–1	3–4		4–2
6	Ann O'Donnell (USA)	1	4	9	19		1–4	4–3	0–4	2–4	2–4	

Source: Official Report, vol. 3, p. 278

==== Round 1 Pool H ====
Pos	Fencer	W	L	TF	TA	Qual.	YNB	MCC	MR	KRG	MH
1	Yelena Novikova-Belova (URS)	3	1	15	6	Q		4–0	3–4	4–2	4–0
2	Maria Consolata Collino (ITA)	3	1	12	11	Q	0–4		4–3	4–2	4–2
3	Margarita Rodríguez (CUB)	2	2	14	11	Q	4–3	3–4		3–4	4–0
4	Karin Rutz-Gießelmann (FRG)	2	2	12	13		2–4	2–4	4–3		4–2
5	Madeleine Heitz (SUI)	0	4	4	16		0–4	2–4	0–4	2–4	

Source: Official Report, vol. 3, p. 278

=== Quarterfinals ===
==== Quarterfinal A ====
Pos	Fencer	W	L	TF	TA	Qual.	MCDD	KP	GG	IB	MM	MS
1	Marie-Chantal Depetris-Demaille (FRA)	3	2	15	9	Q		4–0	3–4	4–0	0–4	4–1
2	Kerstin Palm (SWE)	3	2	15	10	Q	0–4		3–4	4–1	4–0	4–1
3	Galina Gorokhova (URS)	3	2	18	16	Q	4–3	4–3		4–2	3–4	3–4
4	Irmela Broniecki (FRG)	2	3	11	15		0–4	1–4	2–4		4–0	4–3
5	Max Madsen (DEN)	2	3	11	15		4–0	0–4	4–3	0–4		3–4
6	Mária Szolnoki (HUN)	2	3	13	18		1–4	1–4	4–3	3–4	4–3	

Source: Official Report, vol. 3, p. 278

==== Quarterfinal B ====
Pos	Fencer	W	L	TF	TA	Qual.	ARL	BGD	YNB	BO	HB	ISUR
1	Antonella Ragno-Lonzi (ITA)	4	1	19	13	Q		3–4	4–0	4–3	4–3	4–3
2	Brigitte Gapais-Dumont (FRA)	4	1	18	14	Q	4–3		4–3	4–2	2–4	4–2
3	Yelena Novikova-Belova (URS)	3	2	15	16	Q	0–4	3–4		4–3	4–3	4–2
4	Brigitte Oertel (FRG)	1	3	12	13		3–4	2–4	3–4		4–1	
5	Halina Balon (POL)	1	4	14	18		3–4	4–2	3–4	1–4		3–4
6	Ildikó Ságiné Ujlakyné Rejtő (HUN)	1	3	11	15		3–4	2–4	2–4		4–3	

Source: Official Report, vol. 3, p. 278

==== Quarterfinal C ====
Pos	Fencer	W	L	TF	TA	Qual.	IFB	KLR	GL	IGDJ	MR	AZ
1	Ildikó Farkasinszky-Bóbis (HUN)	3	2	14	12	Q		0–4	4–2	4–0	2–4	4–2
2	Katarína Lokšová-Ráczová (TCH)	3	2	15	13	Q	4–0		2–4	1–4	4–2	4–3
3	Giulia Lorenzoni (ITA)	3	2	15	14	Q	2–4	4–2		1–4	4–3	4–1
4	Ileana Gyulai-Drîmbă-Jenei (ROU)	3	2	13	13		0–4	4–1	4–1		4–3	1–4
5	Margarita Rodríguez (CUB)	1	3	12	14		4–2	2–4	3–4	3–4		
6	Aleksandra Zabelina (URS)	1	3	10	13		2–4	3–4	1–4	4–1		

Source: Official Report, vol. 3, p. 278

==== Quarterfinal D ====
Pos	Fencer	W	L	TF	TA	Qual.	CRC	ClC	MCC	EFC	RW	SG
1	Cathérine Rousselet-Ceretti (FRA)	4	1	19	7	Q		4–2	4–0	3–4	4–1	4–0
2	Claudine le Comte (BEL)	4	1	18	10	Q	2–4		4–2	4–0	4–2	4–2
3	Maria Consolata Collino (ITA)	3	2	14	12	Q	0–4	2–4		4–2	4–0	4–2
4	Elżbieta Franke-Cymerman (POL)	3	2	14	17		4–3	0–4	2–4		4–3	4–3
5	Ruth White (USA)	1	4	10	17		1–4	2–4	0–4	3–4		4–1
6	Sue Green (GBR)	0	5	8	20		0–4	2–4	2–4	3–4	1–4	

Source: Official Report, vol. 3, p. 279

=== Semifinals ===
==== Semifinal A ====
Pos	Fencer	W	L	TF	TA	Qual.	YNB	KP	MCDD	CRC	MCC	KLR
1	Yelena Novikova-Belova (URS)	4	1	19	11	Q		3–4	4–2	4–1	4–3	4–1
2	Kerstin Palm (SWE)	3	2	18	14	Q	4–3		3–4	4–0	4–3	3–4
3	Marie-Chantal Depetris-Demaille (FRA)	3	2	16	13	Q	2–4	4–3		2–4	4–2	4–0
4	Cathérine Rousselet-Ceretti (FRA)	3	2	13	13		1–4	0–4	4–2		4–3	4–0
5	Maria Consolata Collino (ITA)	1	4	15	17		3–4	3–4	2–4	3–4		4–1
6	Katarína Lokšová-Ráczová (TCH)	1	4	6	19		1–4	4–3	0–4	0–4	1–4	

Source: Official Report, vol. 3, p. 279

==== Semifinal B ====
Pos	Fencer	W	L	TF	TA	Qual.	IFB	GG	ARL	BGD	GL	ClC
1	Ildikó Farkasinszky-Bóbis (HUN)	4	1	19	13	Q		4–1	3–4	4–3	4–2	4–3
2	Galina Gorokhova (URS)	3	2	15	10	Q	1–4		4–0	2–4	4–2	4–0
3	Antonella Ragno-Lonzi (ITA)	3	2	15	13	Q	4–3	0–4		4–2	3–4	4–0
4	Brigitte Gapais-Dumont (FRA)	2	3	15	15		3–4	4–2	2–4		2–4	4–1
5	Giulia Lorenzoni (ITA)	2	3	12	17		2–4	2–4	4–3	4–2		0–4
6	Claudine le Comte (BEL)	1	4	8	16		3–4	0–3	0–4	1–4	4–0	

Source: Official Report, vol. 3, p. 279

=== Final ===
Ragno-Lonzi again lost to Gorokhova, but this time that was her only loss; her 4–1 record in the final earned her gold. Farkasinszky-Bóbis, Gorokhova, and Depetris-Demaille tied at 3–2, with touch-quotient the tie-breaker: Farkasinszky-Bóbis took silver at 1.214, Gorokhova earned bronze at 1.143, and Deptris-Demaille finished fourth at 0.875.

Pos	Fencer	W	L	TF	TA	ARL	IFB	GG	MCDD	YNB	KP
1st place, gold medalist(s)	Antonella Ragno-Lonzi (ITA)	4	1	19	13		4–3	3–4	4–2	4–1	4–3
2nd place, silver medalist(s)	Ildikó Farkasinszky-Bóbis (HUN)	3	2	17	14	3–4		4–1	2–4	4–3	4–2
3rd place, bronze medalist(s)	Galina Gorokhova (URS)	3	2	16	14	4–3	1–4		3–4	4–3	4–0
4	Marie-Chantal Depetris-Demaille (FRA)	3	2	14	16	2–4	4–2	4–3		0–4	4–3
5	Yelena Novikova-Belova (URS)	2	3	15	13	1–4	3–4	3–4	4–0		4–1
6	Kerstin Palm (SWE)	0	5	9	20	3–4	2–4	0–4	3–4	1–4	

Source: Official Report, vol. 3, p. 279

Fencer	Country
Antonella Ragno-Lonzi	Italy
Ildikó Farkasinszky-Bóbis	Hungary
Galina Gorokhova	Soviet Union
Marie-Chantal Depetris-Demaille	France
Yelena Novikova-Belova	Soviet Union
Kerstin Palm	Sweden
Cathérine Rousselet-Ceretti	France
Brigitte Gapais-Dumont	France
Maria Consolata Collino	Italy
Giulia Lorenzoni	Italy
Katarína Lokšová-Ráczová	Czechoslovakia
Claudine le Comte	Belgium
Irmela Broniecki	West Germany
Brigitte Oertel	West Germany
Ileana Gyulai-Drîmbă-Jenei	Romania
Elżbieta Franke-Cymerman	Poland
Max Madsen	Denmark
Halina Balon	Poland
Margarita Rodríguez	Cuba
Ruth White	United States
Mária Szolnoki	Hungary
Ildikó Ságiné Ujlakyné Rejtő	Hungary
Aleksandra Zabelina	Soviet Union
Sue Green	Great Britain
Marlene Infante	Cuba
Olga Orban-Szabo	Romania
Ana Derșidan-Ene-Pascu	Romania
Marion Exelby	Australia
Elke Radlingmaier	Austria
Christine McDougall	Australia
Fabienne Regamey	Switzerland
Karin Rutz-Gießelmann	West Germany
Harriet King	United States
María Esther García	Cuba
Hannelore Hradez	Austria
Kamilla Składanowska	Poland
Donna Hennyey	Canada
Janet Wardell-Yerburgh	Great Britain
Clare Henley	Great Britain
Madeleine Heitz	Switzerland
Waltraut Peck-Repa	Austria
Sylvia Iannuzzi-San Martín	Argentina
Özden Ezinler	Turkey
Ann O'Donnell	United States
