= Fencing at the 1972 Summer Olympics – Women's team foil =

Fencing at the Olympics

Women's team foil at the Games of the XX Olympiad
- Venue: Exhibition Halls 12 & 20
- Dates: 7 – 8 September 1972
- Competitors: 53 from 11 nations

Medalists
1st place, gold medalist(s)		Yelena Novikova-Belova, Galina Gorokhova, Aleksandra Zabelina, Svetlana Tširkova, Tatyana Petrenko-Samusenko	Soviet Union
2nd place, silver medalist(s)		Ildikó Ságiné Ujlakyné Rejtő, Ildikó Farkasinszky-Bóbis, Ildikó Schwarczenberger-Tordasi, Mária Szolnoki, Ildikó Rónay-Matuscsák	Hungary
3rd place, bronze medalist(s)		Ecaterina Stahl-Iencic, Ileana Gyulai-Drîmbă-Jenei, Olga Orban-Szabo, Ana Derșidan-Ene-Pascu	Romania

The women's team foil was one of eight fencing events on the fencing at the 1972 Summer Olympics programme. It was the fourth appearance of the event. The competition was held from 7 to 8 September 1972. 53 fencers from 11 nations competed.

== Rosters ==
Austria
- Ingrid Gosch
- Hannelore Hradez
- Adrienne Krebitz
- Elke Radlingmaier
- Waltraut Peck-Repa

Cuba
- Irene Forbes
- María Esther García
- Marlene Infante
- Margarita Rodríguez
- Nereida Rodríguez

France
- Marie-Chantal Depetris-Demaille
- Cathérine Rousselet-Ceretti
- Claudie Herbster-Josland
- Brigitte Gapais-Dumont

Great Britain
- Sue Green
- Clare Henley
- Sally Anne Littlejohns
- Janet Wardell-Yerburgh
- Susan Wrigglesworth

Hungary
- Ildikó Ságiné Ujlakyné Rejtő
- Ildikó Farkasinszky-Bóbis
- Ildikó Schwarczenberger-Tordasi
- Mária Szolnoki
- Ildikó Rónay-Matuscsák

Italy
- Antonella Ragno-Lonzi
- Giulia Lorenzoni
- Der Reka Cipriani
- Maria Consolata Collino
- Giuseppina Bersani

Poland
- Halina Balon
- Krystyna Machnicka-Urbańska
- Jolanta Bebel-Rzymowska
- Kamilla Składanowska
- Elżbieta Franke-Cymerman

Romania
- Ecaterina Stahl-Iencic
- Ileana Gyulai-Drîmbă-Jenei
- Olga Orban-Szabo
- Ana Derșidan-Ene-Pascu

Soviet Union
- Yelena Novikova-Belova
- Galina Gorokhova
- Aleksandra Zabelina
- Svetlana Tširkova
- Tatyana Petrenko-Samusenko

United States
- Ruth White
- Natalia Clovis
- Tatyana Adamovich
- Harriet King
- Ann O'Donnell

West Germany
- Gundi Theuerkauff
- Irmela Broniecki
- Karin Rutz-Gießelmann
- Monika Pulch
- Erika Bethmann

== Results ==
=== Round 1 ===
==== Round 1 Pool A ====
Romania and France each defeated Great Britain, 9–7 and 10–6, respectively. The two victors then faced off. Romania won 8–7, with a 44–38 touches advantage making the final bout irrelevant.

Pos	Team	W	L	BW	BL	Qual.	ROU	FRA	GBR
1	Romania	2	0	17	14	QQ		8–7	9–7
2	France	1	1	17	14	QQ	7–8		10–6
3	Great Britain	0	2	13	19		7–9	6–10	

Source: Official Report, vol. 3, pp. 280–81

==== Round 1 Pool B ====
Pos	Team	W	L	BW	BL	Qual.	ITA	FRG	POL	USA
1	Italy	3	0	28	17	QS		8.47–8.46	10–3	10–6
2	West Germany	2	1	25	18	QQ	8.46–8.47		8.48–8.42	9–2
3	Poland	1	2	19	26		3–10	8.42–8.48		8.47–8.43
4	United States	0	3	16	27		6–10	2–9	8.43–8.47	

Source: Official Report, vol. 3, pp. 280–81

==== Round 1 Pool C ====
Pos	Team	W	L	BW	BL	Qual.	URS	HUN	CUB	AUT
1	Soviet Union	3	0	34	11	QS		9–4	11–5	14–2
2	Hungary	2	1	31	14	QQ	4–9		14–2	13–3
3	Cuba	0	2	7	25		5–11	2–14		
4	Austria	0	2	5	27		2–14	3–13		

Source: Official Report, vol. 3, pp. 280–81

=== Elimination rounds ===
Quarterfinals
A2	Hungary	9
C2	France	7
B1	Italy
Bye
A1	Romania	8
B2	West Germany	6
C1	Soviet Union
Bye

Semifinals
A2	Hungary	9
B1	Italy	6
A1	Romania	4
C1	Soviet Union	9

Final
A2	Hungary	5
C1	Soviet Union	9
Third place
B1	Italy	7
A1	Romania	9

Fifth Place
C2	France	7
B2	West Germany	8
