= Fencing at the 1968 Summer Olympics – Women's foil =

Fencing at the Olympics

Women's foil at the Games of the XIX Olympiad
- Venue: Fernando Montes de Oca Fencing Hall
- Dates: 19–20 October
- Competitors: 38 from 16 nations

Medalists
1st place, gold medalist(s)		Elena Belova	Soviet Union
2nd place, silver medalist(s)		Pilar Roldán	Mexico
3rd place, bronze medalist(s)		Ildikó Ságiné Ujlakyné Rejtő	Hungary

The women's foil was one of eight fencing events on the fencing at the 1968 Summer Olympics programme. It was the tenth appearance of the event. The competition was held from 19 to 20 October 1968. 38 fencers from 16 nations competed.

== Competition format ==
The 1968 tournament continued to use a mix of pool play and knockout rounds, but with substantial changes from 1964. The first two rounds were round-robin pool play, followed by a knockout round, finishing with another pool for the final. Barrages were eliminated and the knockout round was a modified double elimination round.

- Round 1: 6 pools, with 6 or 7 fencers in each pool. The top 4 fencers in each pool advanced, cutting the field from 38 to 24.
- Round 2: 4 pools, with 6 fencers per pool. Again, the top 4 fencers advanced, reducing the number of remaining fencers from 24 to 16.
- Knockout round: This was a modified double-elimination tournament. The 16 fencers were divided into 4 groups of 4. The winner of the "winners bracket" in each group advanced to the final pool. The winner of the "losers bracket" from each group faced the winner of a different group's "losers bracket," with the winner of that match advancing to the final pool as well. The knockout round winnowed the fencers from 16 to 6.
- Final round: A final pool with the 6 remaining fencers determined the medals and 4th through 6th place.

== Results ==
=== Round 1 ===
==== Round 1 Pool A ====
Pos	Fencer	W	L	TF	TA	Qual.	AZ	BCP	MTF	JYR	EFC	JB
1	Aleksandra Zabelina (URS)	4	1	19	12	Q		1–0	0–1	1–0	1–0	1–0
2	Bruna Colombetti-Peroncini (ITA)	3	2	16	13	Q	0–1		1–0	0–1	1–0	1–0
3	Milady Tack-Fang (CUB)	3	2	15	15	Q	1–0	0–1		0–1	1–0	1–0
4	Jan York-Romary (USA)	3	2	17	17	Q	0–1	1–0	1–0		0–1	1–0
5	Elżbieta Franke-Cymerman (POL)	2	3	16	14		0–1	0–1	0–1	1–0		1–0
6	Judith Bain (GBR)	0	5	8	20		0–1	0–1	0–1	0–1	0–1	

Source: Official Report, vol. 3, p. 640
Legend: Blue = left column team win; Yellow = draw; Red = top row team win.

==== Round 1 Pool B ====
Pos	Fencer	W	L	TF	TA	Qual.	ARL	LSD	MCDD	JWY	KS	IW
1	Antonella Ragno-Lonzi (ITA)	5	0	20	10	Q		1–0	1–0	1–0	1–0	1–0
2	Lídia Sákovicsné Dömölky (HUN)	3	2	17	14	Q	0–1		1–0	1–0	1–0	0–1
3	Marie-Chantal Depetris-Demaille (FRA)	2	3	15	13	Q	0–1	0–1		1–0	0–1	1–0
4	Janet Wardell-Yerburgh (GBR)	2	3	11	15	Q	0–1	0–1	0–1		1–0	1–0
5	Kamilla Składanowska (POL)	2	3	15	16		0–1	0–1	1–0	0–1		1–0
6	Ivonne Witteveen (AHO)	1	4	9	19		0–1	1–0	0–1	0–1	0–1	

Source: Official Report, vol. 3, p. 640
Legend: Blue = left column team win; Yellow = draw; Red = top row team win.

==== Round 1 Pool C ====
Pos	Fencer	W	L	TF	TA	Qual.	KP	HK	IGDJ	MP	IFB	LR
1	Kerstin Palm (SWE)	4	1	19	9	Q		1–0	0–1	1–0	1–0	1–0
2	Harriet King (USA)	3	2	16	11	Q	0–1		1–0	1–0	0–1	1–0
3	Ileana Gyulai-Drîmbă-Jenei (ROU)	3	2	17	14	Q	1–0	0–1		0–1	1–0	1–0
4	Monika Pulch (FRG)	3	2	15	14	Q	0–1	0–1	1–0		1–0	1–0
5	Ildikó Farkasinszky-Bóbis (HUN)	2	3	12	13		0–1	1–0	0–1	0–1		1–0
6	Lourdes Roldán (MEX)	0	5	2	20		0–1	0–1	0–1	0–1	0–1	

Source: Official Report, vol. 3, p. 640
Legend: Blue = left column team win; Yellow = draw; Red = top row team win.

==== Round 1 Pool D ====
Pos	Fencer	W	L	TF	TA	Qual.	EB	OOS	CRC	HM	SG	RdM
1	Elena Belova (URS)	5	0	20	5	Q		1–0	1–0	1–0	1–0	1–0
2	Olga Orban-Szabo (ROU)	4	1	18	7	Q	0–1		1–0	1–0	1–0	1–0
3	Cathérine Rousselet-Ceretti (FRA)	3	2	14	14	Q	0–1	0–1		1–0	1–0	1–0
4	Helga Mees (FRG)	1	4	10	16	Q	0–1	0–1	0–1		1–0	0–1
5	Sue Green (GBR)	1	4	9	17		0–1	0–1	0–1	0–1		1–0
6	Rosa del Moral (MEX)	1	4	7	19		0–1	0–1	0–1	1–0	0–1	

Source: Official Report, vol. 3, p. 640
Legend: Blue = left column team win; Yellow = draw; Red = top row team win.

==== Round 1 Pool E ====
Pos	Fencer	W	L	TF	TA	Qual.	ESI	PR	GG	HS	CF	MA	SISM
1	Ecaterina Stahl-Iencic (ROU)	6	0	24	12	Q		1–0	1–0	1–0	1–0	1–0	1–0
2	Pilar Roldán (MEX)	5	1	22	16	Q	0–1		1–0	1–0	1–0	1–0	1–0
3	Galina Gorokhova (URS)	4	2	22	11	Q	0–1	0–1		1–0	1–0	1–0	1–0
4	Heidi Schmid (FRG)	2	4	15	17	Q	0–1	0–1	0–1		0–1	1–0	1–0
5	Colette Flesch (LUX)	2	4	16	19		0–1	0–1	0–1	1–0		0–1	1–0
6	Myrna Anselma (AHO)	1	5	10	22		0–1	0–1	0–1	0–1	1–0		0–1
7	Sylvia Iannuzzi-San Martín (ARG)	1	5	10	22		0–1	0–1	0–1	0–1	0–1	1–0	

Source: Official Report, vol. 3, p. 640
Legend: Blue = left column team win; Yellow = draw; Red = top row team win.

==== Round 1 Pool F ====
Pos	Fencer	W	L	TF	TA	Qual.	ISUR	BGD	GM	SC	MR	HB	VS
1	Ildikó Ságiné Ujlakyné Rejtő (HUN)	5	1	23	10	Q		0–1	1–0	1–0	1–0	1–0	1–0
2	Brigitte Gapais-Dumont (FRA)	4	2	22	14	Q	1–0		1–0	0–1	1–0	0–1	1–0
3	Giovanna Masciotta (ITA)	3	3	17	15	Q	0–1	0–1		0–1	1–0	1–0	1–0
4	Sigrid Chatel (CAN)	3	3	19	18	Q	0–1	1–0	1–0		0–1	0–1	1–0
5	Margarita Rodríguez (CUB)	3	3	15	18		0–1	0–1	0–1	1–0		1–0	1–0
6	Halina Balon (POL)	2	4	14	20		0–1	1–0	0–1	1–0	0–1		0–1
7	Veronica Smith (USA)	1	5	6	21		0–1	0–1	0–1	0–1	0–1	1–0	

Source: Official Report, vol. 3, p. 640
Legend: Blue = left column team win; Yellow = draw; Red = top row team win.

=== Round 2 ===
==== Round 2 Pool A ====
Pos	Fencer	W	L	TF	TA	Qual.	OOS	PR	CRC	GM	JYR	AZ
1	Olga Orban-Szabo (ROU)	3	2	18	12	Q		1–0	1–0	0–1	0–1	1–0
2	Pilar Roldán (MEX)	3	2	16	12	Q	0–1		1–0	0–1	1–0	1–0
3	Cathérine Rousselet-Ceretti (FRA)	3	2	16	12	Q	0–1	0–1		1–0	1–0	1–0
4	Giovanna Masciotta (ITA)	3	2	16	15	Q	1–0	1–0	0–1		1–0	0–1
5	Jan York-Romary (USA)	2	3	11	15		1–0	0–1	0–1	0–1		1–0
6	Aleksandra Zabelina (URS)	1	4	8	19		0–1	0–1	0–1	1–0	0–1	

Source: Official Report, vol. 3, p. 640
Legend: Blue = left column team win; Yellow = draw; Red = top row team win.

==== Round 2 Pool B ====
Pos	Fencer	W	L	TF	TA	Qual.	IGDJ	ARL	BGD	GG	HK	HM
1	Ileana Gyulai-Drîmbă-Jenei (ROU)	4	1	18	12	Q		0–1	1–0	1–0	1–0	1–0
2	Antonella Ragno-Lonzi (ITA)	3	2	18	11	Q	1–0		0–1	0–1	1–0	1–0
3	Brigitte Gapais-Dumont (FRA)	3	2	16	12	Q	0–1	1–0		0–1	1–0	1–0
4	Galina Gorokhova (URS)	3	2	18	14	Q	0–1	1–0	1–0		0–1	1–0
5	Harriet King (USA)	2	3	11	17		0–1	0–1	0–1	1–0		1–0
6	Helga Mees (FRG)	0	5	5	20		0–1	0–1	0–1	0–1	0–1	

Source: Official Report, vol. 3, p. 640
Legend: Blue = left column team win; Yellow = draw; Red = top row team win.

==== Round 2 Pool C ====
Pos	Fencer	W	L	TF	TA	Qual.	ISUR	KP	BCP	MCDD	SC	MP
1	Ildikó Ságiné Ujlakyné Rejtő (HUN)	5	0	20	10	Q		1–0	1–0	1–0	1–0	1–0
2	Kerstin Palm (SWE)	4	1	18	10	Q	0–1		1–0	1–0	1–0	1–0
3	Bruna Colombetti-Peroncini (ITA)	2	3	16	15	Q	0–1	0–1		0–1	1–0	1–0
4	Marie-Chantal Depetris-Demaille (FRA)	2	3	13	18	Q	0–1	0–1	1–0		0–1	1–0
5	Sigrid Chatel (CAN)	1	4	9	17		0–1	0–1	0–1	1–0		0–1
6	Monika Pulch (FRG)	1	4	12	18		0–1	0–1	0–1	0–1	1–0	

Source: Official Report, vol. 3, p. 640
Legend: Blue = left column team win; Yellow = draw; Red = top row team win.

==== Round 2 Pool D ====
Pos	Fencer	W	L	TF	TA	Qual.	EB	ESI	LSD	HS	JWY	MTF
1	Elena Belova (URS)	4	1	16	10	Q		1–0	0–1	1–0	1–0	1–0
2	Ecaterina Stahl-Iencic (ROU)	3	2	14	12	Q	0–1		1–0	1–0	0–1	1–0
3	Lídia Sákovicsné Dömölky (HUN)	3	2	16	14	Q	1–0	0–1		1–0	1–0	0–1
4	Heidi Schmid (FRG)	2	3	15	15	Q	0–1	0–1	0–1		1–0	1–0
5	Janet Wardell-Yerburgh (GBR)	2	3	12	16		0–1	1–0	0–1	0–1		1–0
6	Milady Tack-Fang (CUB)	1	4	12	18		0–1	0–1	1–0	0–1	0–1	

Source: Official Report, vol. 3, p. 640
Legend: Blue = left column team win; Yellow = draw; Red = top row team win.

=== Double elimination rounds ===
==== Winners brackets ====
===== Winners group 1 =====
Round of 16		Round of 8
Ildikó Ságiné Ujlakyné Rejtő (HUN)	W
Marie-Chantal Depetris-Demaille (FRA)	L	Ildikó Ságiné Ujlakyné Rejtő (HUN)	L
Galina Gorokhova (URS)	W	Galina Gorokhova (URS)	W
Ileana Gyulai-Drîmbă-Jenei (ROU)	L

===== Winners group 2 =====
Round of 16		Round of 8
Antonella Ragno-Lonzi (ITA)	L
Cathérine Rousselet-Ceretti (FRA)	W	Cathérine Rousselet-Ceretti (FRA)	L
Heidi Schmid (FRG)	L	Kerstin Palm (SWE)	W
Kerstin Palm (SWE)	W

===== Winners group 3 =====
Round of 16		Round of 8
Ecaterina Stahl-Iencic (ROU)	L
Giovanna Masciotta (ITA)	W	Giovanna Masciotta (ITA)	L
Lídia Sákovicsné Dömölky (HUN)	L	Pilar Roldán (MEX)	W
Pilar Roldán (MEX)	W

===== Winners group 4 =====
Round of 16		Round of 8
Olga Orban-Szabo (ROU)	L
Brigitte Gapais-Dumont (FRA)	W	Brigitte Gapais-Dumont (FRA)	L
Bruna Colombetti-Peroncini (ITA)	L	Elena Belova (URS)	W
Elena Belova (URS)	W

==== Losers brackets ====
===== Losers group 1 =====
Round of 4
Marie-Chantal Depetris-Demaille (FRA)	W
Ileana Gyulai-Drîmbă-Jenei (ROU)	L
Antonella Ragno-Lonzi (ITA)	L
Heidi Schmid (FRG)	W

Round of 4
Marie-Chantal Depetris-Demaille (FRA)	L
Ildikó Ságiné Ujlakyné Rejtő (HUN)	W
Heidi Schmid (FRG)	W
Cathérine Rousselet-Ceretti (FRA)	L

Round of 2
Ildikó Ságiné Ujlakyné Rejtő (HUN)	W
Heidi Schmid (FRG)	L

===== Losers group 2 =====
Round of 4
Ecaterina Stahl-Iencic (ROU)	W
Lídia Sákovicsné Dömölky (HUN)	L
Olga Orban-Szabo (ROU)	W
Bruna Colombetti-Peroncini (ITA)	L

Round of 4
Ecaterina Stahl-Iencic (ROU)	L
Giovanna Masciotta (ITA)	W
Olga Orban-Szabo (ROU)	L
Brigitte Gapais-Dumont (FRA)	W

Round of 2
Giovanna Masciotta (ITA)	L
Brigitte Gapais-Dumont (FRA)	W

=== Final round ===
Pos	Fencer	W	L	TF	TA	EB	PR	ISUR	BGD	KP	GG
1	Elena Belova (URS)	4	1	19	11		1–0	1–0	1–0	1–0	0–1
2	Pilar Roldán (MEX)	3	2	17	14	0–1		0–1	1–0	1–0	1–0
3	Ildikó Ságiné Ujlakyné Rejtő (HUN)	3	2	14	16	0–1	1–0		0–1	1–0	1–0
4	Brigitte Gapais-Dumont (FRA)	2	3	15	15	0–1	0–1	1–0		0–1	1–0
5	Kerstin Palm (SWE)	2	3	17	17	0–1	0–1	0–1	1–0		1–0
6	Galina Gorokhova (URS)	1	4	10	19	1–0	0–1	0–1	0–1	0–1	

Source: Official Report, vol. 3, p. 641
Legend: Blue = left column team win; Yellow = draw; Red = top row team win.
