= Fencing at the 1968 Summer Olympics – Women's team foil =

Fencing at the Olympics

Women's team foil at the Games of the XIX Olympiad
- Venue: Fernando Montes de Oca Fencing Hall
- Dates: 23 – 24 October
- Competitors: 52 from 10 nations

Medalists
| 1st place, gold medalist(s) | | Yelena Novikova-Belova, Galina Gorokhova, Aleksandra Zabelina, Tatyana Petrenko-Samusenko, Svetlana Tširkova | Soviet Union |
| 2nd place, silver medalist(s) | | Ildikó Ságiné Ujlakyné Rejtő, Ildikó Farkasinszky-Bóbis, Paula Marosi, Lídia Sákovicsné Dömölky, Mária Gulácsy | Hungary |
| 3rd place, bronze medalist(s) | | Ecaterina Stahl-Iencic, Ileana Gyulai-Drîmbă-Jenei, Olga Orban-Szabo, Ana Derșidan-Ene-Pascu, Maria Vicol | Romania |

The women's team foil was one of eight fencing events on the fencing at the 1968 Summer Olympics programme. It was the third appearance of the event. The competition was held from 23 to 24 October 1968. 52 fencers from 10 nations competed.

== Rosters ==
France
- Cathérine Rousselet-Ceretti
- Brigitte Gapais-Dumont
- Marie-Chantal Depetris-Demaille
- Claudie Herbster-Josland
- Annick Level

Great Britain
- Judith Bain
- Janet Wardell-Yerburgh
- Sue Green
- Julia Davis
- Eva Davies

Hungary
- Ildikó Ságiné Ujlakyné Rejtő
- Ildikó Farkasinszky-Bóbis
- Paula Marosi
- Lídia Sákovicsné Dömölky
- Mária Gulácsy

Italy
- Antonella Ragno-Lonzi
- Giulia Lorenzoni
- Giovanna Masciotta
- Bruna Colombetti-Peroncini
- Silvana Sconciafurno

Mexico
- Pilar Roldán
- Linda Béjar
- Lourdes Roldán
- Sonia Arredondo
- Rosa del Moral

Poland
- Halina Balon
- Kamilla Składanowska
- Elżbieta Franke-Cymerman
- Elżbieta Pawlas
- Wanda Fukała-Kaczmarczyk

Romania
- Ecaterina Stahl-Iencic
- Ileana Gyulai-Drîmbă-Jenei
- Olga Orban-Szabo
- Ana Derșidan-Ene-Pascu
- Maria Vicol

Soviet Union
- Yelena Novikova-Belova
- Galina Gorokhova
- Aleksandra Zabelina
- Tatyana Petrenko-Samusenko
- Svetlana Tširkova

United States
- Harriet King
- Veronica Smith
- Sally Pechinsky
- Maxine Mitchell
- Jan York-Romary

West Germany
- Heidi Schmid
- Helga Koch
- Gundi Theuerkauff
- Monika Pulch
- Helga Mees

== Results ==
=== Round 1 ===
==== Pool A ====
| Pos | Team | W | L | BW | BL | Qual. | FRA | FRG | MEX |
|---|---|---|---|---|---|---|---|---|---|
| 1 | France | 2 | 0 | 17 | 14 | Q | | 8–7 | 9–7 |
| 2 | West Germany | 1 | 1 | 15 | 16 | Q | 7–8 | | 8.48–8.42 |
| 3 | Mexico | 0 | 2 | 15 | 17 | | 7–9 | 8.42–8.48 | |

Source: Official Report, vol. 3, pp. 648–49

==== Pool B ====
| Pos | Team | W | L | BW | BL | Qual. | HUN | ITA | USA |
|---|---|---|---|---|---|---|---|---|---|
| 1 | Hungary | 2 | 0 | 22 | 10 | Q | | 9–7 | 13–3 |
| 2 | Italy | 1 | 1 | 17 | 15 | Q | 7–9 | | 10–6 |
| 3 | United States | 0 | 2 | 9 | 23 | | 3–13 | 6–10 | |

Source: Official Report, vol. 3, pp. 648–49

==== Pool C ====
| Pos | Team | W | L | BW | BL | Qual. | ROU | URS | POL | GBR |
|---|---|---|---|---|---|---|---|---|---|---|
| 1 | Romania | 3 | 0 | 32 | 16 | Q | | 9–7 | 10–6 | 13–3 |
| 2 | Soviet Union | 2 | 1 | 32 | 15 | Q | 7–8 | | 12–4 | 13–3 |
| 3 | Poland | 0 | 2 | 10 | 22 | | 6–10 | 4–12 | | |
| 4 | Great Britain | 0 | 2 | 6 | 26 | | 3–13 | 3–13 | | |

Source: Official Report, vol. 3, pp. 648–49

=== Elimination rounds ===
Quarterfinals
B2 | Italy | 4
C2 | Soviet Union | 9
A2 | West Germany | 3
B1 | Hungary | 9

Semifinals
C2 | Soviet Union | 9
A1 | France | 3
B1 | Hungary | 8 (49)
C1 | Romania | 8 (52)

Final
C2 | Soviet Union | 9
B1 | Hungary | 3
Third place
A1 | France | 8 (47)
C1 | Romania | 8 (45)

| Fifth Place |
| B2 | Italy | 7 |
| A2 | West Germany | 8 |

== Final ranking ==
| Rank | Nation |
|---|---|
| 1st place, gold medalist(s) | Soviet Union |
| 2nd place, silver medalist(s) | Hungary |
| 3rd place, bronze medalist(s) | Romania |
| 4 | France |
| 5 | West Germany |
| 6 | Italy |
| 7 | Mexico |
| 7 | Poland |
| 7 | United States |
| 10 | Great Britain |
