= Austria at the 1972 Summer Olympics =

- IOC code: AUT
- NOC: Austrian Olympic Committee

in Munich, West Germany August 26, 1972 – September 10, 1972
- Competitors: 111 (97 men and 14 women) in 15 sports
- Flag bearer: Hubert Raudaschl
- Medals Ranked 31st: Gold 0 Silver 1 Bronze 2 Total 3

Summer Olympics appearances (overview)
- 1896; 1900; 1904; 1908; 1912; 1920; 1924; 1928; 1932; 1936; 1948; 1952; 1956; 1960; 1964; 1968; 1972; 1976; 1980; 1984; 1988; 1992; 1996; 2000; 2004; 2008; 2012; 2016; 2020; 2024

Other related appearances
- 1906 Intercalated Games

Austria competed at the 1972 Summer Olympics in Munich, West Germany. 111 competitors, 97 men and 14 women, took part in 68 events in 15 sports.

== Medalists ==
Medal	Name	Sport	Event
Silver	Norbert Sattler	Canoeing	Men's K1 Kayak Slalom Singles
Bronze	Ilona Gusenbauer	Athletics	Women's High Jump
Bronze	Rudolf Dollinger	Shooting	Men's Free Pistol

== Athletics ==
Men's 100 metres

- Axel Nepraunik
  - First Heat — 10.61s (→ did not advance)

Men's 4 × 100 m Relay

- Georg Regner, Axel Nepraunik, Gunther Würfel, and Helmut Lang
  - Heat — 40.49s
  - Semifinals — DNF (→ did not advance)

== Boxing ==
Men's Light Middleweight (– 71 kg)

- Franz Csandl
  - First Round — Bye
  - Second Round — Lost to Rolando Garbey (CUB), 0:5

== Cycling ==
Five cyclists represented Austria in 1972.

Individual road race

- Roman Humenberger — 14th place
- Johann Summer — 46th place
- Wolfgang Steinmayr — 55th place
- Rudolf Mitteregger — 71st place

Team time trial

- Sigi Denk
- Roman Humenberger
- Rudolf Mitteregger
- Johann Summer

== Diving ==
Men's 3m Springboard:

- Rudolf Kruspel — 293.58 points (→ 31st place)
- Josef Kien — 285.30 points (→ 32nd place)

Men's 10m Platform:

- Nikola Stajkovic — 280.29 points (→ 18th place)
- Rudolf Kruspel — 248.07 points (→ 33rd place)

Women's 10m Platform:

- Ingeborg Pertmayr — 321.03 points (→ 8th place)

== Fencing ==
13 fencers, 8 men and 5 women, represented Austria in 1972.

Men's foil

- Roland Losert

Men's épée

- Rudolf Trost
- Karl-Heinz Müller
- Roland Losert

Men's team épée

- Roland Losert, Karl-Heinz Müller, Herbert Polzhuber, Rudolf Trost

Men's sabre

- Hanns Brandstätter
- Fritz Prause
- Bernd Brodar

Men's team sabre

- Hanns Brandstätter, Bernd Brodar, Fritz Prause, Günther Ulrich

Women's foil

- Elke Radlingmaier
- Hannelore Hradez
- Waltraut Peck-Repa

Women's team foil

- Ingrid Gosch, Hannelore Hradez, Adrienne Krebitz, Elke Radlingmaier, Waltraut Peck-Repa

== Modern pentathlon ==
Three male pentathletes represented Austria in 1972.

Men's Individual Competition:

- Wolfgang Leu — 4852 points (→ 18th place)
- Peter Zobl-Wessely — 4545 points (→ 35th place)
- Bruno Jerebicnik — 4415 points (→ 44th place)

Men's Team Competition:

- Leu, Zobl-Wessely, and Jerebicnik — 13865 points (→ 11th place)

== Rowing ==
Men's Coxed Pairs

- Rainer Hinteregger, Manfred Grieshofer and Werner Grieshofer
  - Heat — 8:08.88
  - Repechage — 8:15.94 (→ did not advance)

== Sailing ==
Open

Athlete	Event	Race							Net points	Final rank
Athlete	Event	1	2	3	4	5	6	7	Net points	Final rank
Kurt Seidl; Ernst Seidl	Flying Dutchman	15	5	26	~~DNS~~	18	9	19	127.0	18
Hubert Raudaschl; Erich Moritz	Tempest	5	6	13	~~15~~	3	12	14	84.4	10
Manfred Stelzl; Peter Luschan	Star	8	15	5	15	7	7	~~18~~	92.0	11
Uli Strohschneider; Peter Denzel; Robert Haschka	Soling	~~26~~	16	15	13	13	8	—N/a	95.0	17
Harald Fereberger; Franz Eisl; Karl Stangl	Dragon	9	6	13	5	10	~~17~~	—N/a	71.7	10

== Shooting ==
Seven male shooters represented Austria in 1972. Rudolf Dollinger won bronze in the 50 m pistol event.

Open

Athlete	Event	Final	
Athlete	Event	Score	Rank
Rudolf Dollinger	50 m free pistol	560	Bronze medal
Karl Fröschl	50 m rifle prone	587	67
Hubert Garschall	50 m free pistol	548	21
Hubert Garschall	25 m rapid fire pistol	581	32
Guido Loacker	50 m rifle three positions	1126	39
Josef Meixner	Trap	186	20
Gerhard Petritsch	25 m rapid fire pistol	590	8
Wolfram Waibel, Sr.	50 m rifle three positions	1137	25
Wolfram Waibel, Sr.	50 m rifle prone	596	13
