= Romania at the 1968 Summer Olympics =

- IOC code: ROU (ROM used at these Games)
- NOC: Romanian Olympic Committee

in Mexico City
- Competitors: 82 in 9 sports
- Flag bearer: Aurel Vernescu
- Medals Ranked 12th: Gold 4 Silver 6 Bronze 5 Total 15

Summer Olympics appearances (overview)
- 1900; 1904–1920; 1924; 1928; 1932; 1936; 1948; 1952; 1956; 1960; 1964; 1968; 1972; 1976; 1980; 1984; 1988; 1992; 1996; 2000; 2004; 2008; 2012; 2016; 2020; 2024; 2028

Romania competed at the 1968 Summer Olympics in Mexico City, Mexico. 82 competitors, 66 men and 16 women, took part in 64 events in 9 sports.

== Medalists ==
Medal	Name	Sport	Event	Date
Gold				
Gold				
Gold				
Gold				
Silver				
Silver				
Silver				
Silver				
Silver				
Silver				
Bronze				
Bronze				
Bronze				
Bronze				
Bronze				

Medals by sport
Sport	1st place, gold medalist(s)	2nd place, silver medalist(s)	3rd place, bronze medalist(s)	Total
Athletics				
Boxing				
Canoeing				
Fencing				
Rowing				
Shooting				
Wrestling				
Total	4	6	5	15

Medals by gender
Gender	1st place, gold medalist(s)	2nd place, silver medalist(s)	3rd place, bronze medalist(s)	Total
Male				
Female				
Total	4	6	5	15

=== Gold ===
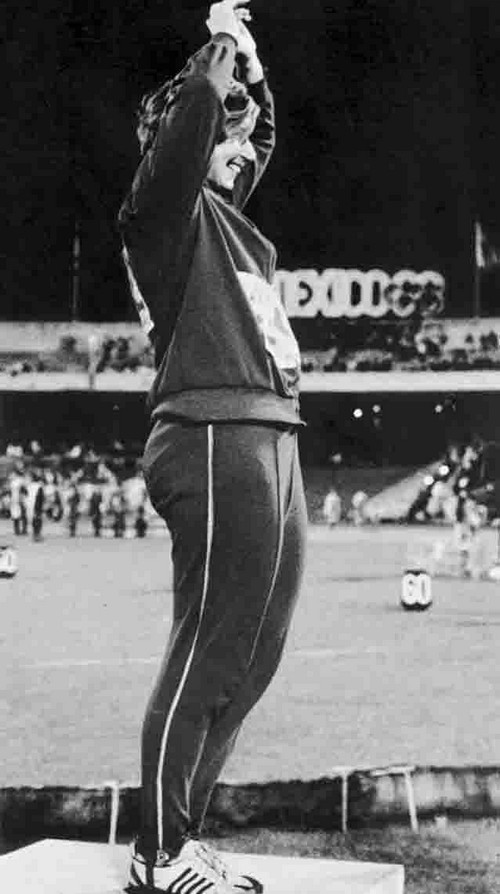
Lia Manoliu after her victory.

- Viorica Viscopoleanu — Athletics, Women's Long Jump
- Lia Manoliu — Athletics, Women's Discus Throw
- Serghei Covaliov and Ivan Patzaichin — Canoeing, Men's C2 1000m Canadian Pairs
- Ion Drîmbă — Fencing, Men's Foil Individual

=== Silver ===
- Ileana Silai — Athletics, Women's 800 metres
- Mihaela Peneș — Athletics, Women's Javelin Throw
- Ion Monea — Boxing, Men's Light Heavyweight
- Anton Calenic, Dimitrie Ivanov, Haralambie Ivanov, and Mihai Țurcaș — Canoeing, Men's K4 1000m Kayak Fours
- Marcel Roșca — Shooting, Men's Rapid-Fire Pistol
- Ion Baciu — Wrestling, Men's Greco-Roman Bantamweight

=== Bronze ===
- Calistrat Cuțov — Boxing, Men's Lightweight
- Viorica Dumitru — Canoeing, Women's K1 500m Kayak Singles
- Ileana Gyulai-Drimba, Ana Pascu-Ene-Dersidan, Ecaterina Stahl-Iencic, Olga Szabo-Orban and Maria Vicol — Fencing, Women's Foil Team
- Simion Popescu — Wrestling, Men's Featherweight
- Nicolae Martinescu — Wrestling, Men's Greco-Roman Light Heavyweight

== Cycling ==
One cyclist represented Romania in 1968.

Individual road race

- Emil Rusu

Individual pursuit

- Emil Rusu

== Fencing ==
Ten fencers, five men and five women, represented Romania in 1968.

Men's foil

- Ion Drîmbă
- Mihai Țiu
- Tănase Mureșanu

Men's team foil

- Ion Drîmbă, Mihai Țiu, Ștefan Haukler, Tănase Mureșanu, Iuliu Falb

Men's épée

- Ștefan Haukler
- Tănase Mureșanu

Women's foil

- Ecaterina Stahl-Iencic
- Olga Orban-Szabo
- Ileana Gyulai-Drîmbă-Jenei

Women's team foil

- Ecaterina Stahl-Iencic, Ileana Gyulai-Drîmbă-Jenei, Olga Orban-Szabo, Ana Derșidan-Ene-Pascu, Maria Vicol

== Shooting ==
Twelve shooters, all men, represented Romania in 1968. Marcel Roşca won silver in the 25 m pistol.

25 m pistol

- Marcel Roşca
- Virgil Atanasiu

50 m pistol

- Neagu Bratu
- Lucian Giuşcă

300 m rifle, three positions

- Petre Șandor
- Ștefan Kaban

50 m rifle, three positions

- Nicolae Rotaru
- Ion Olărescu

50 m rifle, prone

- Nicolae Rotaru
- Marin Ferecatu

Trap

- Ion Dumitrescu
- Gheorghe Florescu

Skeet

- Gheorghe Sencovici

== Swimming ==
Men

Athlete	Event	Heat		Semifinal		Final	
Athlete	Event	Time	Rank	Time	Rank	Time	Rank
Ladislau Koszta	100 m breaststroke	1:10.1	14 Q	1:09.8	=13	Did not advance	
Ladislau Koszta	200 m breaststroke	2:36.4	=11	—N/a		Did not advance	

Women

Athlete	Event	Heat		Semifinal		Final	
Athlete	Event	Time	Rank	Time	Rank	Time	Rank
Anca Andreiu	100 m backstroke	1:11.8	=18	Did not advance			
Anca Andreiu	200 m backstroke	2:38.8	19	—N/a		Did not advance	
