= 1969 World Fencing Championships =

International fencing competition

1969 World Championships in Fencing
- Host city: Havana, Cuba

The 1969 World Fencing Championships were held in Havana, Cuba. The event took place from September 30 to October 12, 1969, at the Ciudad Deportiva Coliseum.

== Overview ==
The Havana World championships were the third straight major fencing event held in the Americas after the 1967 edition in Montreal and the 1968 Summer Olympics in Mexico. Cuba gave the competition political overtones, including it in the celebrations for the ten years of the Cuban Revolution. Fencing was also stopped on 8 October for a commemoration of the anniversary of Che Guevara's death. The United States, who do not have formal diplomatic relations with Cuba, sent a restricted delegation of 25 fencers. The competition was also marred by numerous failures of the electrical apparatus to the heat and humidity.

On sportive terms, the championships were dominated by countries of the Eastern Bloc, especially the Soviet Union, who claimed all three men's team titles. Romania earned their first women's world title.

== Results ==
=== Men ===
Event	Gold	Silver	Bronze
Spadă la individual	Bohdan Andrzejewski (POL)	Aleksey Nikanchikov (URS)	Carl von Essen (SWE)
Spadă pe echipe	Soviet Union; Aleksey Nikanchikov; Grigori Kriss; Sergey Paramonov; Igor Valetov; Georgi Zažitski	Hungary; Győző Kulcsár; Zoltán Nemere; Csaba Fenyvesi; Pál Schmitt; Pál B. Nagy	Sweden; Carl von Essen; Orvar Jönsson; Hans Jacobson; Lars-Erik Larsson; Rolf Edling
Floretă la individual	Friedrich Wessel (FRG)	Vasyl Stankovych (URS)	Ryszard Parulski (POL)
Floretă pe echipe	Soviet Union; Viktor Putyatin; Yury Sharov; Leonid Romanov; Vasyl Stankovych; German Sveshnikov	Poland; Ryszard Parulski; Lech Koziejowski; Jerzy Kaczmarek; Marek Dąbrowski; Witold Woyda	Romania; Ion Drîmbă; Mihai Țiu; Ștefan Haukler; Iuliu Falb; Ștefan Ardeleanu
Sabie la individual	Viktor Sidyak (URS)	János Kalmár (HUN)	Péter Bakonyi (HUN)
Sabie pe echipe	Soviet Union; Viktor Sidyak; Mark Rakita; Vladimir Nazlymov; Eduard Vinokurov; Umyar Mavlikhanov	Poland; Jerzy Pawłowski; Józef Nowara; Zygmunt Kawecki; Krzysztof Grzegorek; Janusz Majewski	Hungary; Péter Bakonyi; János Kalmár; Attila Kovács; Tamás Kovács; Miklós Meszéna

=== Women ===
Event	Gold	Silver	Bronze
Floretă la individual	Elena Novikova (URS)	Ileana Drîmbă (ROU)	Svetlana Tširkova (URS)
Floretă pe echipe	Romania; Ileana Drîmbă; Olga Szabo; Maria Vicol; Ana Ene; Suzana Ardeleanu	Soviet Union; Alexandra Zabelina; Elena Novikova; Svetlana Tširkova; Tatyana Samusenko; Galina Gorokhova	Hungary; Katalin Kollányi; Judit Ágoston-Mendelényi; Ágnes Simonffy; Mária Szolnoki; Ildikó Rejtő

== Medal table ==
Rank	Nation	Gold	Silver	Bronze	Total
1	Soviet Union (URS)	5	3	1	9
2	Poland (POL)	1	2	1	4
3	Romania (ROU)	1	1	1	3
4	West Germany (FRG)	1	0	0	1
5	Hungary (HUN)	0	2	3	5
6	Sweden (SWE)	0	0	2	2
Totals (6 entries)		8	8	8	24

== Sources ==
- FIE Results
- Ottogalli, Cécile; Six, Gérard; Terret, Thierry (2010). Un pour tous, tous pour un. L'histoire des championnats du monde d'escrime. Paris: Le Cherche Midi. p. 70–1. ISBN 978-2-7491-1372-2. WCH.
