= Suzana Ardeleanu =

Romanian fencer (born 1946)

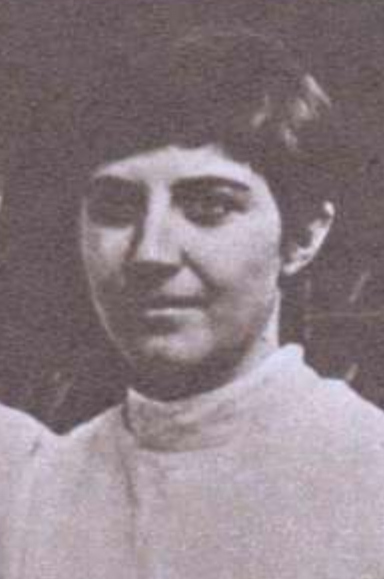

Personal information
- Full name: Suzana Clara Tași-Ardeleanu
- Born: 8 March 1946 (age 80) Satu Mare, Romania
- Height: 1.65 m (5 ft 5 in)

Fencing career
- Sport: Fencing
- Weapon: foil
- Hand: right-handed
- Club: CSA Steaua București
- Retired: 1980
Medal record
Women's foil
Representing Romania
World Championships
Gold medal – first place	1969 Havana	Team foil
Bronze medal – third place	1973 Gothenburg	Team foil
Bronze medal – third place	1974 Grenoble	Team foil
Bronze medal – third place	1975 Budapest	Team foil
Bronze medal – third place	1977 Buenos Aires	Team foil
Bronze medal – third place	1978 Hamburg	Team foil

Suzana Ardeleanu (née Suzana Tași; born 8 March 1946) is a Romanian fencer. She competed in the women's individual and team foil events at the 1980 Summer Olympics.

== Career ==
Ardeleanu learnt fencing at a local club under coach Alexandru Csipler. She transferred in 1964 along with Ecaterina Iencic and Ileana Gyulai to CSA Steaua București, which are related to the football team Steaua Bucharest, where she was trained by Andrei Vâlcea. Along with Olga Szabo, Maria Vicol, Ana Ene-Derșidan and Ileana Gyulai, she became team world champion at the 1969 World Fencing Championships in Havana.

She retired as an athlete after the 1980 Summer Olympics and became a fencing coach in Satu Mare along with her husband, foil fencer Ștefan Ardeleanu.
