= Regamey =

Regamey or Régamey is a surname. Notable people with the surname include:

- Constantin Regamey (1907–1982), Swiss philologist, orientalist, musician, composer, and critic
- Fabienne Regamey (born 1952), Swiss fencer
- Marcel Regamey (1905–1982), Swiss essayist and journalist
- Maurice Régamey (1924–2009), Polish-born French actor and film director
- Robert-Henri Regamey (1907–1978), Swiss physician and microbiologist
