= Uniqa Classic =

Race details
- Region: Austria
- Discipline: Road
- Competition: UCI Europe Tour
- Type: Stage race

History
- First edition: 1953
- Editions: 53
- Final edition: 2005
- First winner: Frank Becksteiner (AUT)
- Most wins: Roman Humenberger (AUT); Maurizio Vandelli (ITA) (3 wins)
- Final winner: Bram de Groot (NED)

The Uniqa Classic was a staged cycling race held in Austria. It was created in 1953 and was part of UCI Europe Tour in 2005 as a 2.1 event, but has not been held since. Its main sponsor was insurance company Uniqa, which the race was named after. Bram de Groot won the final edition of the race in 2005.

== Winners ==
List of winners:

- 1953 : (Austria) Frank Becksteiner
- 1954 : (Austria) Adolf Christian
- 1955 : (Austria) Richard Durlacher
- 1956 : (Austria) Adolf Christian
- 1957 : (Austria) Heinz Klöckl
- 1958 : (Austria) Walter Müller
- 1959 : (Austria) Kurt Schweiger
- 1960 : (Austria) Félix Damm
- 1961 : (East Germany) Klaus Ampler
- 1962 : (Austria) Walter Müller
- 1963 : (Austria) Kurt Schattelbauer
- 1964 : (Austria) Kurt Schweiger
- 1965 : (Austria) Robert Csenar
- 1966 : (East Germany) Siegfried Huster
- 1967 : (Austria) Roman Humenberger
- 1968 : (Austria) Rudolf Kretz
- 1969 : (Czechoslovakia) Vlado Hajtmann
- 1970 : (East Germany) Manfred Dähne
- 1971 : (Austria) Roman Humenberger
- 1972 : (Czechoslovakia) Frantisek Kondr
- 1973 : (Austria) Franz Inthaler
- 1974 : (Austria) Wolfgang Steinmayr
- 1975 : (Austria) Rudi Mitteregger
- 1976 : (Austria) Roman Humenberger
- 1977 : (Austria) Hans Summer
- 1978 : (Czechoslovakia) Vendolin Kvetan
- 1979 : (Austria) Hans Summer
- 1980 : (Austria) Johann Lienhart
- 1981 : (Austria) Christian Pail
- 1982 : (Austria) Helmut Wechselberger
- 1983 : (Austria) Reinhard Popp
- 1984 : (Austria) Franz Spilauer
- 1985 : (Austria) Johann Lienhart
- 1986 : (Czechoslovakia) Ondrej Glajza
- 1987 : (Austria) Johann Lienhart
- 1988 : (Austria) Albert Hainz
- 1989 : (Austria) Albert Hainz
- 1990 : (Austria) Dietmar Hauer
- 1991 : (Czechoslovakia) Roman Kreuziger
- 1992 : (Austria) Andreas Langl
- 1993 : (Austria) Georg Totschnig
- 1994 : (Austria) Franz Stocher
- 1995 : (Germany) Andreas Lebsanft
- 1996 : (Netherlands) Léon van Bon
- 1997 : (Italy) Roberto Pistore
- 1998 : (Switzerland) Niki Aebersold
- 1999 : (Italy) Maurizio Vandelli
- 2000 : (Italy) Maurizio Vandelli
- 2001 : (Italy) Maurizio Vandelli
- 2002 : (Czech Republic) Adam Homolka
- 2003 : (United Kingdom) Roger Hammond
- 2004 : (Finland) Kjell Carlström
- 2005 : (Netherlands) Bram de Groot
