= Tatyana Petrenko-Samusenko =

Soviet fencer (1938–2000)

Personal information
- Born: 2 November 1938 Minsk, Byelorussian SSR, Soviet Union
- Died: 24 January 2000 (aged 61) Minsk, Belarus
- Height: 1.61 m (5 ft 3 in)
- Weight: 57 kg (126 lb)

Sport
- Sport: Fencing
- Club: Dynamo Minsk
Medal record
Representing Soviet Union
Olympic Games
Gold medal – first place	1960 Rome	Foil, women's team
Gold medal – first place	1968 Mexico City	Foil, women's team
Gold medal – first place	1972 Munich	Foil, women's team
Silver medal – second place	1964 Tokyo	Foil, women's team
World Fencing Championships
Gold medal – first place	1963 Gdansk	Foil, team
Gold medal – first place	1965 Paris	Foil, team
Gold medal – first place	1966 Moscow	Foil, team
Gold medal – first place	1966 Moscow	Foil, individual
Gold medal – first place	1970 Ankara	Foil, team
Silver medal – second place	1959 Budapest	Foil, team
Silver medal – second place	1962 Buenos Aires	Foil, team
Silver medal – second place	1967 Montreal	Foil, team
Silver medal – second place	1969 Havana	Foil, team
Bronze medal – third place	1959 Budapest	Foil, individual

Tatyana Petrenko-Samusenko (Russian: Татьяна Дмитриевна Петренко-Самусенко; 2 November 1938 – 24 January 2000) was a Soviet fencer. She won gold medals in the team foil event at the 1960, 1968 and 1972 Summer Olympics.

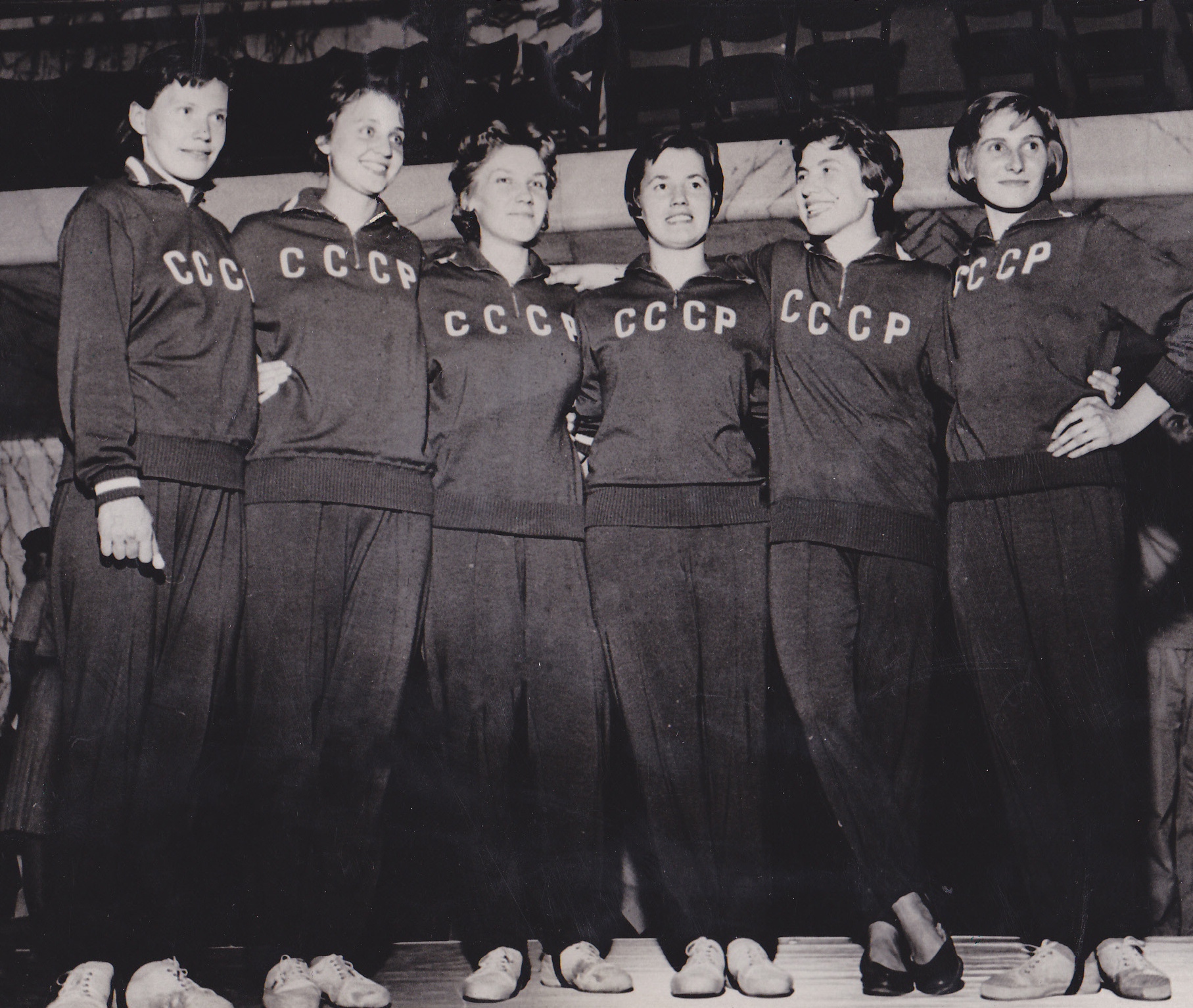
Soviet foil team at the 1960 Olympics, Petrenko-Samusenko is 3rd from left

In 1962 Petrenko-Samusenko received a degree in engineering from a technical university in Minsk. In retirement she worked as a fencing coach. She was awarded the Order of the Badge of Honour, Medal "For Distinguished Labour" and Medal "For Labour Valour".

In March 1996, while her flat was being robbed, Petrenko-Samusenko jumped from a second-floor balcony. A rough landing resulted in multiple fractures in her spine and legs. She never recovered, and died in January 2000.
