= Heitz =

Heitz is a German surname. Notable people with the surname include:

- Arsène Heitz (1908–1989), French draughtsman and co-author of the Flag of Europe
- Emil Heitz (1892–1965), German-Swiss botanist and geneticist
- Kenny Heitz (1947–2012), American basketball player
- Madeleine Heitz (born 1940), Swiss fencer
- Markus Heitz (born 1971), German writer
- Walter Heitz (1878–1944), German Wehrmacht general

== See also ==
- Heitz Wine Cellars, American winery
