= Svetlana Tširkova-Lozovaja =

Soviet fencer and coach

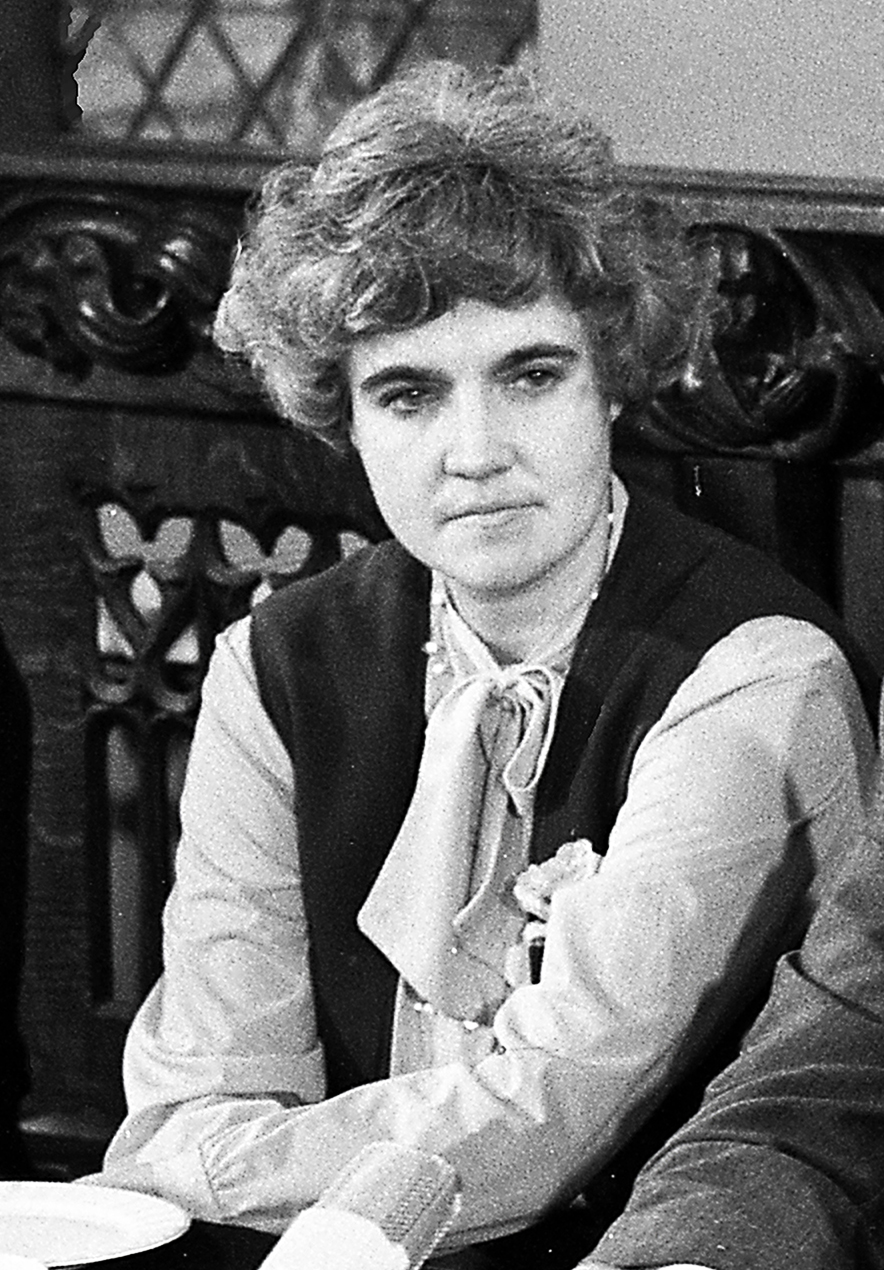

Personal information
- Born: 5 November 1945 (age 80) Tsivilsky District, Chuvash ASSR, Soviet Union

Sport
- Sport: Fencing
- Coached by: Clavdij Jadlovskij
Medal record
Women's fencing
Representing Soviet Union
Olympic Games
Gold medal – first place	1968 Mexico CIty	Foil Team
Gold medal – first place	1972 Munich	Foil Team
World Championships
Gold medal – first place	1970 Ankara	Foil Team
Gold medal – first place	1971 Vienna	Foil Team
Silver medal – second place	1969 Havana	Foil Team
Bronze medal – third place	1969 Havana	Foil Individual

Svetlana Tširkova (from 1980, Tširkova-Lozovaja) (Russian: Светлана Михайловна Чиркова-Лозовая) (born November 5, 1945, Tupner, Tsivilsky District, Chuvash ASSR, Soviet Union) is a former Soviet fencer, two-time Olympic champion in foil team competitions and fencing coach in Estonia.

She received two gold medals in team foil at the Summer Olympics from 1968 and 1972 games.

In the 1969 individual competition at the World Championships in Havana, Cuba, she lost only to Romanian Ileana Gyulai-Drîmbă-Jenei and won bronze medal.

She was awarded with Medal "For Distinguished Labour", classified as a Merited Master of Sport of the USSR in 1972.

Living in Estonia since 1950, she graduated from the Pedagogical University of Tallinn in 1973 and was also 5 time fencing champion of the Estonian SSR.

As an olympic winner, she is honorary member of the Estonian Olympic Committee.

She is a mother of two sons, Eduard "Edik" Ber and Kirill Lozovoi, who are also fencers.

In 2006 she received the Estonian Order of the White Star (Third Class) and in 2016 Tallinn City Cross.

Awards and achievements
Preceded by Laine Erik	Estonian Sportswoman of the Year; 1969	Succeeded by Tiiu Parmas
