= Gosch =

Gosch is a surname. Notable people with the surname include:

- Brian Gosch (born 1971), American politician
- Florian Gosch (born 1980), beach volleyball player
- Ingrid Gosch (born 1949), Austrian fencer
- Johnny Gosch (born 1969), missing person
- Paul Gosch (1885–1940), German artist
