= Ecaterina Stahl-Iencic =

Romanian fencer (1946–2009)

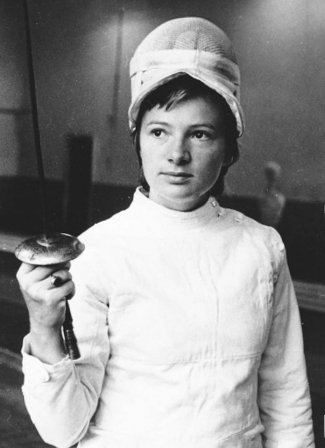

Personal information
- Full name: Ecaterina Clara Stahl-Iencic
- Nickname: Kati
- Born: 31 July 1946 Satu Mare, Romania
- Died: 26 November 2009 (aged 63) Satu Mare, Romania
- Height: 163 cm (5 ft 4 in)
- Weight: 60 kg (132 lb)

Fencing career
- Sport: Fencing
- Weapon: Foil
- Hand: right-handed
- Club: CSA Steaua
- Former coach: Alexandru Csipler; Andrei Valce; Zilaghi Iosif
- Retired: 1984
Medal record
Representing Romania
Olympic Games
Bronze medal – third place	1968 Mexico City	Team foil
Bronze medal – third place	1972 Munich	Team foil
World Championships
Gold medal – first place	1975 Budapest	Individual foil
Silver medal – second place	1965 Paris	Team foil
Silver medal – second place	1970 Ankara	Team foil
Bronze medal – third place	1966 Moscow	Individual foil
Bronze medal – third place	1967 Montreal	Team foil
Bronze medal – third place	1973 Gothenburg	Team foil
Bronze medal – third place	1974 Grenoble	Team foil
Bronze medal – third place	1975 Budapest	Team foil
Bronze medal – third place	1977 Buenos Aires	Team foil
Summer Universiade
Gold medal – first place	1973 Moscow	Team foil
Silver medal – second place	1965 Budapest	Team foil
Silver medal – second place	1970 Turin	Individual foil
Silver medal – second place	1970 Turin	Team foil

Ecaterina Stahl-Iencic (31 July 1946 – 26 November 2009) was a Romanian foil fencer, world champion in 1975. She competed at five Olympics from 1964 to 1980, winning team bronze medals in 1968 and 1972.

== Biography ==
She was born Katalin Jencsik. (Hungarian name order Jencsik Katalin) She belonged to the Hungarian minority in Transylvania. she took up fencing when she was 14 at local club Unio Satu Mare under the coaching of(Hungarian Sándor Csipler) Alexandru Csipler. There she became friends with Ileana Gyulai (Hungarian:Ilona Gyulai), with whom she would fence in the Romanian national team, and with József Szepessy, who would become team world champion with Germany in 1973.

In 1964, at 18 years, Stahl won the Romanian national championship with Unio, and transferred to CSA Steaua in Bucharest. The same year, she took part in her first Olympics in the team foil event. Romania was defeated by the Soviet Union in quarter-finals and finished 5th after prevailing over France. In 1965 she won the Junior World Championships in Rotterdam. She also earned a team silver medal with Romania at the senior 1965 World Fencing Championships. She earned her first major individual medal, a bronze, at the 1966 World Fencing Championships. She would earn two individual medals, including gold in 1975, and seven team medals at the World Championships throughout her career.

In 1967, Stahl married István Stahl, a sports journalist at Hungarian-language magazine Friss Újság. The couple had two daughters, Gabriela and Cristina, who became a foil fencer too. In 1968, Stahl took part in her second Olympics. This time, she earned a team bronze medal, along with Ana Pascu, Ileana Drîmba, Olga Szabo and Maria Vicol. She took another bronze medal at the 1972 Summer Olympics with the same teammates, Maria Vicol being replaced by Ileana Gyulai.

After her retirement in 1984 Stahl became a fencing coach at CS Satu Mare, in her home town. She trained amongst others Olympic silver medallist Rita König and her own daughter, Olympian Cristina. She was named in 2006 honorary citizen of Satu Mare. She died on 26 November 2009 of colon cancer. Her name was given in 2015 to the Satu Mare Cup, a competition of the European women's foil circuit for cadets.
