= Ana Derșidan-Ene-Pascu =

Romanian fencer (1944–2022)

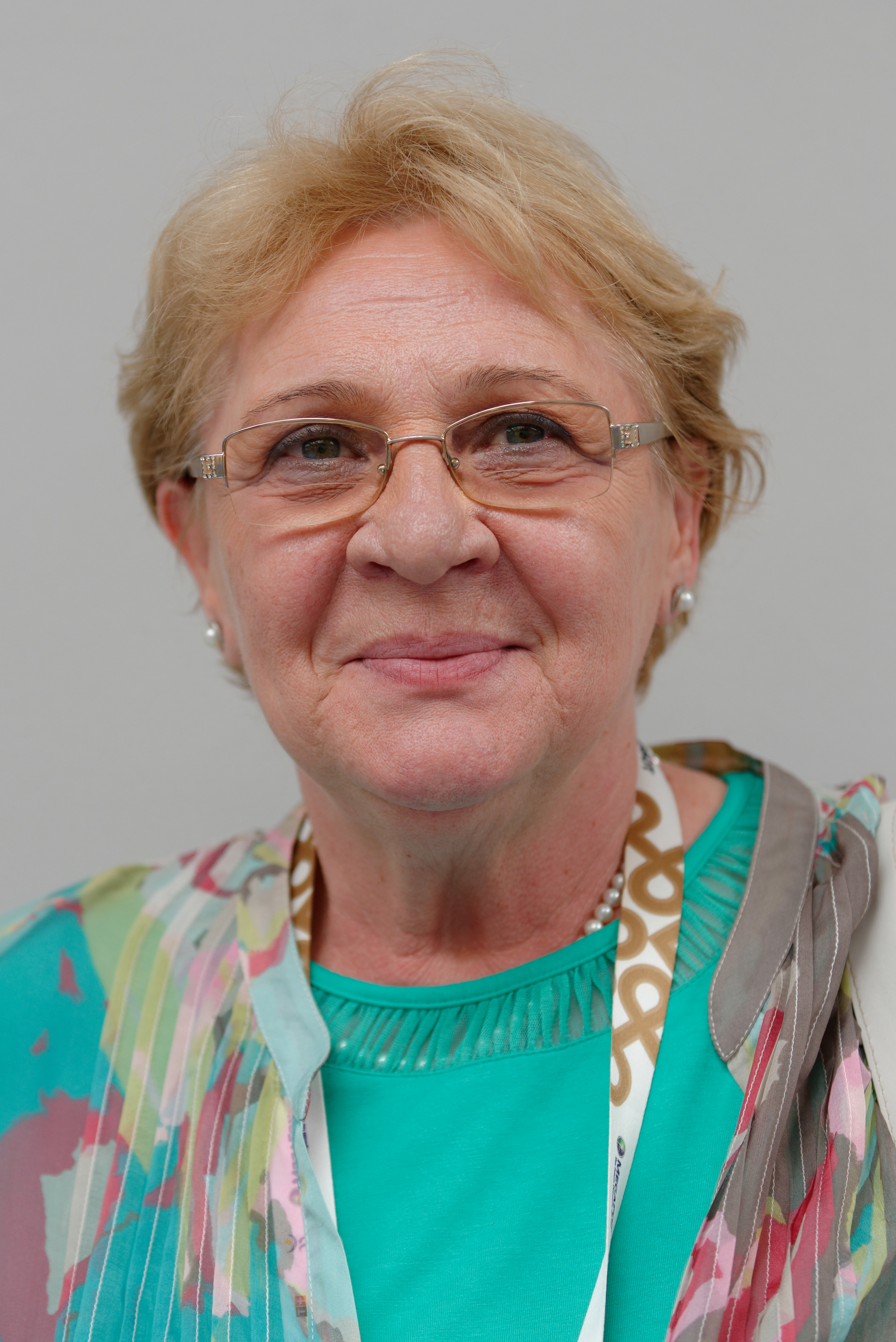
- Pascu at the 2013 World Fencing Championships

Personal information
- Born: 22 September 1944 Bucharest, Romania
- Died: 6 April 2022 (aged 77)
- Height: 163 cm (5 ft 4 in)
- Weight: 59 kg (130 lb)

Fencing career
- Sport: Fencing
- Weapon: Foil
- Hand: Right-handed
- Club: Progresul București; CSA Steaua București
- Head coach: Ghita Man; Angelo Pelegrini; Andrei Valcea
- Retired: 1976
Medal record
Women's fencing
Representing Romania
Olympic Games
Bronze medal – third place	1968 Mexico City	Team foil
Bronze medal – third place	1972 Munich	Team foil
World Championships
Gold medal – first place	1969 Havana	Team foil
Silver medal – second place	1970 Ankara	Team foil
Bronze medal – third place	1967 Montreal	Team foil
Bronze medal – third place	1971 Vienna	Individual foil
Bronze medal – third place	1973 Gothenburg	Team foil
Bronze medal – third place	1974 Grenoble	Team foil
Bronze medal – third place	1975 Budapest	Team foil

Ana Derșidan-Ene-Pascu (22 September 1944 – 6 April 2022) was a Romanian fencer and sport leader. She won a bronze medal in the women's team foil events at the 1968 and 1972 Summer Olympics.

== Biography ==
The daughter of the vice-president of the Romanian Table Tennis Federation, Pascu was fascinated as a child by elite sport. Her first sport idols were table tennis players Angelica Rozeanu and Sari Szasz, who were then at the peak of their careers. When Pascu's father took a position at the Romanian Fencing Federation, she transferred her interests to the sport, which was practiced at the Athenaeum of Bucharest, and whose athletes spoke French. At the age of eleven, she began to take fencing lessons with Italian master Angelo Pellegrini. Future champion Maria Vicol featured amongst his other pupils.

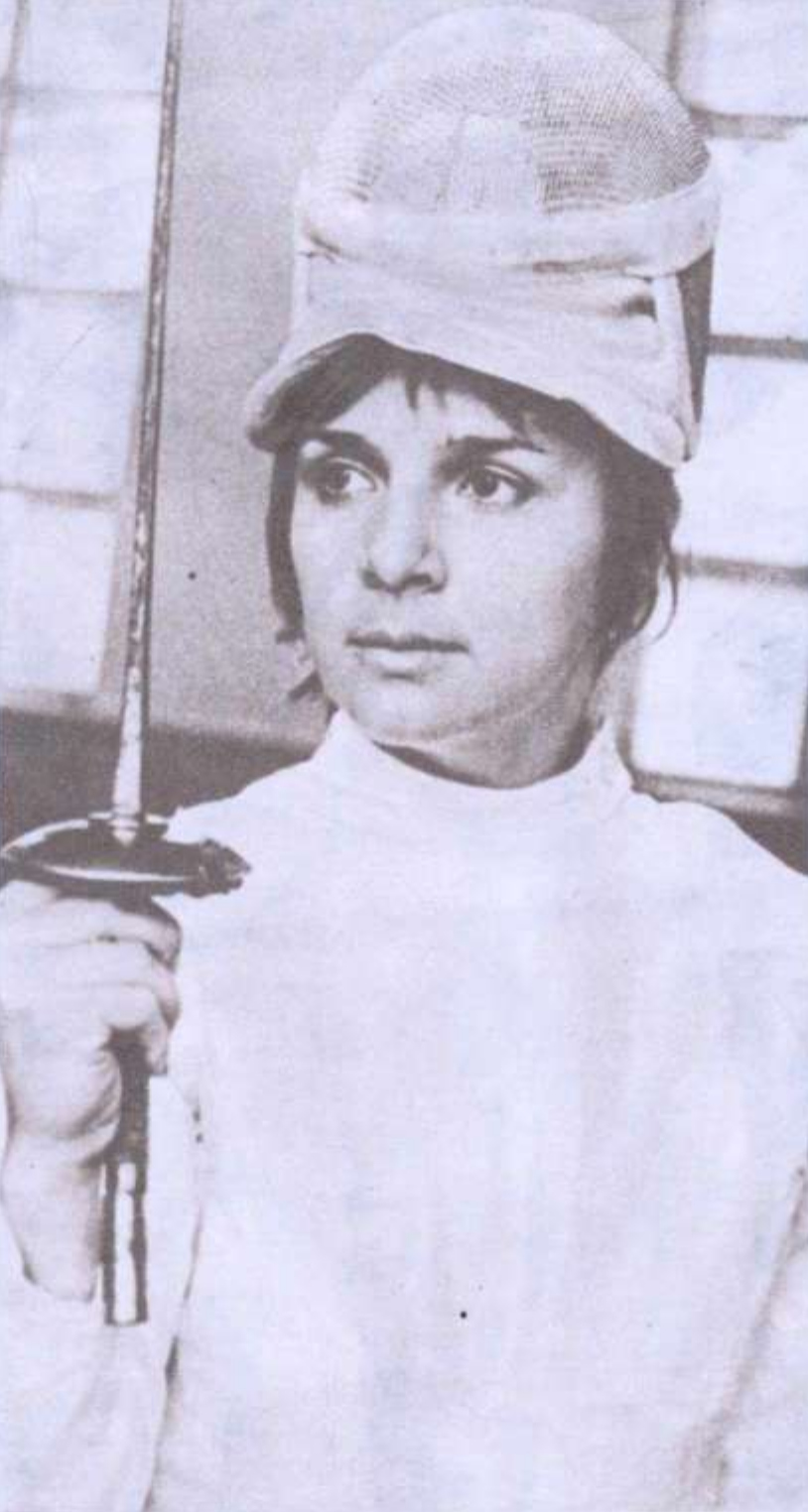
Pascu in 1972

Pascu won the 1963 Junior World Championship in Ghent, a result she considered as the best of her career. She joined the senior national team, which featured Maria Vicol and Marina Stanca. They were later joined by Olga Szabo, Ileana Gyulai, Ecaterina Stahl, and Suzana Ardeleanu. Romania was one of the only countries at the time offering centralised training in fencing: the national team trained twice a day, nine months a year. She made a brilliant career with the Romanian team: she won seven medals in the World Championships and took part in five Olympic Games, earning two bronze medals in 1968 and 1972. She was awarded the title of master emeritus in sports (Maestru Emerit al Sportului) for her performance.

She retired in 1976, after the Summer Olympics of Montreal. In 1981, she gave birth to a son, Alexandru. She led the Romanian Fencing Federation from 1982 to 2013, when she opted not to run for a new term, leaving the road open to Mihai Covaliu. She served as honorary president of the FRS. She was also vice-president of the Romanian Olympic and Sports Committee since 2004.

Pascu was a member of the Rules Commission of the International Fencing Federation (FIE) from 1984 to 1996 and sat at the Refereeing Commission from 1996 to 2004. She was a member of the executive committee of the FIE since 2000 and a vice-president between 2004 and 2021.
