= Bram de Groot =

Dutch cyclist

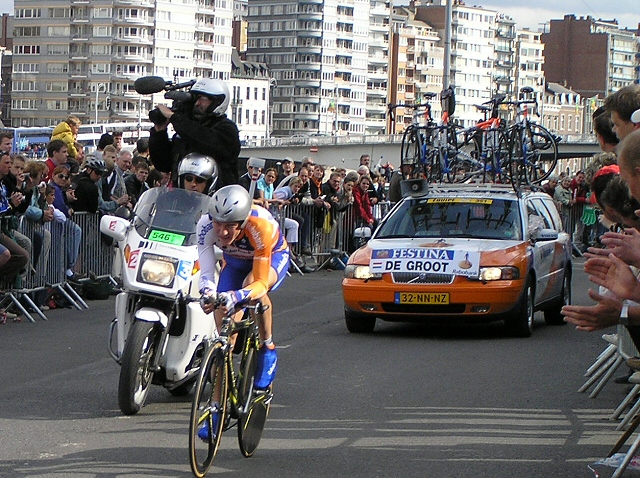

Personal information
- Full name: Bram de Groot
- Born: 18 December 1974 (age 51) Alkmaar, the Netherlands
- Height: 1.73 m (5 ft 8 in)
- Weight: 65 kg (143 lb)

Cycling career
- Sport: Cycling
- Discipline: Road
- Role: Rider

Professional team
- 1999–2009: Rabobank

Bram de Groot (born 18 December 1974, in Alkmaar) is a Dutch former professional road bicycle racer who last rode for UCI ProTour team Rabobank.

== Major results ==
- Uniqa Classic - Overall (2005)
- Delta Ronde van Midden-Zeeland (2005)
- Volta a Catalunya - 1 stage (2003)
- Tour Méditerranéen - 1 stage (2003)
- Circuito Montañés - 1 stage (1999)
