= Ildikó Rejtő =

Hungarian fencer (born 1937)

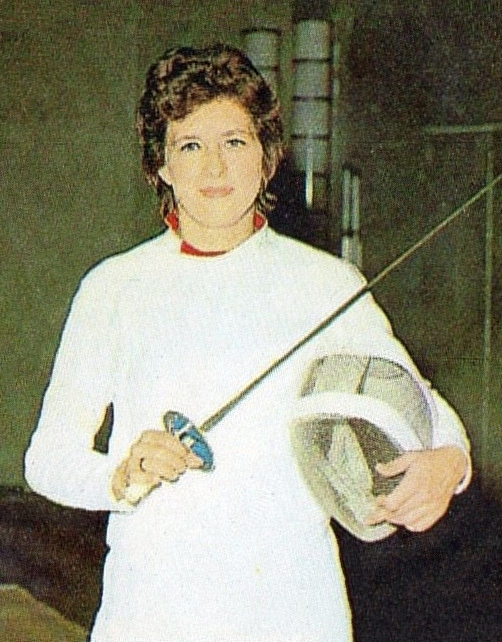

Personal information
- Full name: Ildikó Rejtő Györgyné Sági
- Nickname: Röcsó
- Nationality: Hungarian
- Born: Ildikó Rejtő; 11 May 1937 (age 89) Budapest, Hungary
- Height: 164 cm (5 ft 5 in)
- Weight: 56 kg (123 lb)

Sport
- Country: Hungary
- Sport: Fencing
- Event: Foil
- Club: Újpesti TE
Medal record
Representing Hungary
Olympic Games
Gold medal – first place	1964 Tokyo	Foil individual
Gold medal – first place	1964 Tokyo	Foil team
Silver medal – second place	1960 Rome	Foil team
Silver medal – second place	1968 Mexico City	Foil team
Silver medal – second place	1972 Munich	Foil team
Bronze medal – third place	1968 Mexico City	Foil individual
Bronze medal – third place	1976 Montreal	Foil team
World Championships
Gold medal – first place	1959 Budapest	Foil team
Gold medal – first place	1962 Buenos Aires	Foil team
Gold medal – first place	1963 Gdansk	Foil individual
Gold medal – first place	1967 Montreal	Foil team
Gold medal – first place	1973 Gothenburg	Foil team
Silver medal – second place	1961 Turin	Foil team
Silver medal – second place	1963 Gdansk	Foil team
Silver medal – second place	1966 Moscow	Foil team
Silver medal – second place	1971 Vienna	Foil team
Silver medal – second place	1971 Vienna	Foil individual
Silver medal – second place	1974 Grenoble	Foil team
Silver medal – second place	1975 Budapest	Foil team
Bronze medal – third place	1958 Philadelphia	Foil individual
Bronze medal – third place	1969 Havana	Foil team
Bronze medal – third place	1973 Gothenburg	Foil individual

Ildikó Rejtő (also known as Györgyné Sági, formerly Jenőné Újlaky; born 11 May 1937) is a retired Hungarian two-time Olympic and five-time World Champion foil fencer.

== Early and personal life ==
She was born in Budapest, Hungary, and is Jewish. She was born deaf. She had had scoliosis since she was a teenager, which caused her father to enroll her in fencing lessons, in order to help straighten her back.

== Career highlights ==
Because she was deaf, when she started fencing at age 15 she learned by reading written instructions from her coaches.

She won the junior girls world foil championship in 1956–57, and was the Hungarian women's foil champion in 1958. She was the Hungarian Sportswoman of the Year in 1963 and 1964.

She represented Hungary in every Olympics from 1960 to 1976 and won seven Olympic medals, two gold (one each in foil individual and foil team), three silver (three foil team), and two bronze (one each in foil individual and foil team). At the 1960 Olympics in Rome at the age of 23, she won a team silver medal in women's foil. At the 1964 Olympics in Tokyo at the age of 27, she won both an individual and a team gold medal in women's foil. At the 1968 Olympics in Mexico City at the age of 31, she won an individual bronze medal and a team silver medal in women's foil. At the 1972 Olympics in Munich at the age of 35, she won a team silver medal in women's foil. At the 1976 Olympics in Montreal at the age of 39, she won a team bronze medal in women's foil.

She won the 1963 individual foil World Fencing Championships title, and the 1962, 1967, and 1973 team foil World Championships titles.

As a senior, she won the women's foil competition at the World Veterans Championships in 1999.

Rejtő was inducted as a member of the International Jewish Sports Hall of Fame.

== See also ==
- List of select Jewish fencers
- List of Jewish Olympic medalists
- List of multiple Olympic medalists in one event
- Deaf people in the Olympics

Awards
Preceded by Márta Egerváry	Hungarian Sportswoman of The Year; 1963–64	Succeeded by Jolán Kleiber-Kontsek
