= Maria Vicol =

Romanian fencer (1935–2015)

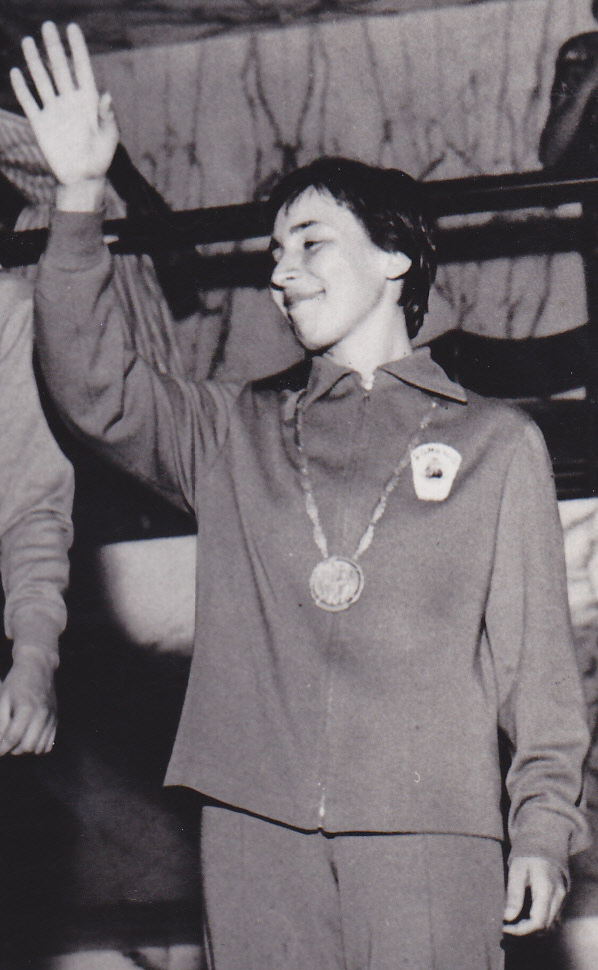
- Vicol at the 1960 Olympics

Personal information
- Full name: Maria Taitiș-Vicol
- Born: 17 October 1935 Bucharest, Romania
- Died: 13 March 2015 (aged 79)
- Height: 1.65 m (5 ft 5 in)
- Weight: 57 kg (126 lb)

Sport
- Sport: Fencing
- Event: Foil
- Coached by: Angelo Pellegrini
Medal record
Representing the Romania
Olympic Games
Bronze medal – third place	1960 Rome	Foil
Bronze medal – third place	1968 Mexico	Team foil
World Championships
Gold medal – first place	1969 Havana	Team foil
Silver medal – second place	1965 Paris	Team foil
Silver medal – second place	1970 Ankara	Team foil
Bronze medal – third place	1961 Turin	Team foil

Maria Vicol (née Taitiș, 17 October 1935 – 13 March 2015) was a Romanian foil fencer, Olympic bronze medalist in 1960 and an Olympic team bronze medalist in 1968.

== Career ==
Vicol took up fencing at Progresul Bucharest, where she was trained by Angelo Pellegrini. In April 1956 she won a silver medal at the Junior World Championships in Luxembourg, bringing Romania its first fencing medal in a major competition. This was followed by a bronze medal in the individual foil at the 1960 Summer Olympics in Rome. She was part of the same generation as Olga Szabo, Ana Pascu, Ecaterina Stahl, Ileana Jenei, and Suzana Ardeleanu, with whom she won several team medals in the World Championships: bronze at the 1961 World Fencing Championships in Turin, silver at the 1965 World Fencing Championships in Paris and the 1970 World Fencing Championships in Ankara and gold at the 1969 World Fencing Championships in Havana. She also earned a team bronze medal at the 1968 Summer Olympics in Mexico.

Vicol began teaching fencing in 1968 at CS Cutezătorii. She then moved to CS Bucharest, where she discovered the future Olympic champion Laura Badea-Cârlescu. She was also an international referee.

Vicol died on 13 March 2015, aged 79. She was married to the rugby player Florin Vicol.
