= Fencing at the 1971 Mediterranean Games =

- Location: İzmir, Turkey
- Dates: September 1967

The fencing competition at the 1971 Mediterranean Games was held in İzmir, Turkey.

This was the first time a women's event was included in the program, individual foil, and the first fencing female gold medalist was Marie-Chantal Demaille of France.

== Medalists ==
=== Men's events ===
Event	Gold	Silver	Bronze
Individual épée	Giovanni Muzio (ITA)	Gianluca Piacella (ITA)	François Jeanne (FRA)
Individual foil	Carlo Montano (ITA)	Christian Noël (FRA)	Edoardo Bernkopf (ITA)
Individual sabre	Rolando Rigoli (ITA)	Gérard Dellocque (FRA)	Mario Aldo Montano (ITA)

=== Women's events ===
Event	Gold	Silver	Bronze
Individual foil	Marie-Chantal Demaille (FRA)	Özden Ezinler (TUR)	Vera Jeftimijades (YUG)

== Medal table ==
Rank	Nation	Gold	Silver	Bronze	Total
1	Italy (ITA)	3	1	2	6
2	France (FRA)	1	2	1	4
3	Turkey (TUR)	0	1	0	1
4	Yugoslavia (YUG)	0	0	1	1
Totals (4 entries)		4	4	4	12
