= Maurizio Vandelli =

Italian cyclist

Personal information
- Born: 9 August 1964 (age 62) Modena, Italy

Cycling career
- Sport: Cycling
- Current team: Retired
- Discipline: Road
- Role: Rider

Professional teams
- 1986–1987: Ariostea–Gres
- 1988–1989: Atala–Ofmega
- 1990–1991: Gis Gelati–Benotto
- 1992: Mercatone Uno–Medeghini–Zucchini
- 2000–2001: Stabil–Steiemark
- 2002: Elk Haus Radteam–Sportunion Schrems
- 2002: Radclub–Resch & Frisch Eybl Wels
- 2004–2006: Radclub–Resch & Frisch Eybl Wels

Maurizio Vandelli (born 9 August 1964 in Modena) is an Italian former cyclist, who competed as a professional from 1986 to 1992 and again from 2000 to 2005.

== Major results ==
1985
1st Stage 11 Vuelta al Tachira
1st Coppa Collecchio
1987
3rd Giro del Veneto
1988
10th Overall Giro d'Italia
1990
1st Overall Ruota d'Oro

1st Stage 1

3rd Coppa Agostoni
1995
2nd Piccolo Giro di Lombardia
1996
1st Stage 1 Giro d'Abruzzo
1st Overall Giro della Valle d'Aosta

1st Stage 3

1997
1st Trofeo Salvatore Morucci
2nd Trofeo Banca Popolare di Vicenza
3rd Overall Giro d'Abruzzo
1998
1st Trofeo Salvatore Morucci
1999
1st Overall Uniqa Classic
1st Overall Tour of Austria

1st Stage 7

3rd Piccolo Giro di Lombardia
3rd Trofeo Gianfranco Bianchin
2000
1st Overall Uniqa Classic
1st Stage 7 Vuelta a Venezuela
3rd Overall Tour of Austria
2001
1st Overall Uniqa Classic

1st Stage 4

3rd Giro del Medio Brenta
2003
3rd Völkermarkter Radsporttage
2004
3rd Overall Tour of Austria
2005
2nd Raiffeisen Grand Prix

=== Grand Tour general classification results timeline ===
Grand Tour	1986	1987	1988	1989	1990	1991	1992
Giro d'Italia	DNF	DNF	10	DNF	22	DNF	—
Tour de France	—	—	—	—	—	—	143
Vuelta a España	—	—	—	—	—	—	DNF

Legend
DNF	Did not finish
