= Myrna Anselma =

Dutch Antillean fencer (1936–2008)

Personal information
- Born: 14 September 1936 Curaçao, Netherlands Antilles
- Died: October 2008 (aged 72)

Sport
- Sport: Fencing

Myrna Crescenda Anselma Plate (14 September 1936 – October 2008) was a Dutch Antillean fencer. She competed in the women's individual foil event at the 1968 Summer Olympics. She was the first Dutch Antillean woman to compete in the Olympics, and later helped to found the Olympians Association of the Netherlands Antilles. She is a member of the Curaçao Sports Federation's hall of fame.
