= Linda Béjar =

Mexican fencer

Personal information
- Born: 9 June 1937 (age 89) Mexico City, Mexico

Sport
- Sport: Fencing

Linda Béjar (born 9 June 1937) is a Mexican fencer. She competed in the women's team foil event at the 1968 Summer Olympics.
