= Sigrid Chatel =

Canadian fencer (born 1940)

Personal information
- Born: 26 April 1940 (age 86) Frankfurt, Germany

Sport
- Sport: Fencing

Sigrid Chatel (born 26 April 1940) is a Canadian fencer. She competed in the women's individual foil event at the 1968 Summer Olympics.
