= Ildikó Farkasinszky-Bóbis =

Hungarian fencer (born 1945)

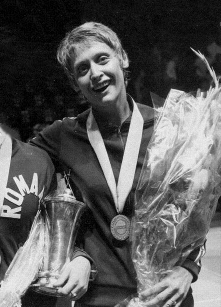
- Farkasinszky-Bóbis at the 1975 World Championships

Personal information
- Full name: Ildikó Farkasinszky-Bóbis
- Born: 5 September 1945 (age 80) Budapest, Hungary

Sport
- Sport: Fencing
- Event: Foil
- Club: BVSC Budapest
Medal record
Representing Hungary
Olympic Games
Silver medal – second place	1968 Mexico City	Team foil
Silver medal – second place	1972 Munich	Foil
Silver medal – second place	1972 Munich	Team foil
Bronze medal – third place	1976 Montréal	Team foil
World Championships
Silver medal – second place	1966 Moscow	Team foil
Gold medal – first place	1967 Montreal	Team foil
Bronze medal – third place	1967 Montreal	Foil
Silver medal – second place	1971 Vienna	Team foil
Gold medal – first place	1973 Gothenburg	Team foil
Gold medal – first place	1974 Grenoble	Foil
Silver medal – second place	1974 Grenoble	Team foil
Silver medal – second place	1975 Budapest	Team foil
Bronze medal – third place	1975 Budapest	Foil

Ildikó Farkasinszky-Bóbis (born 5 September 1945) is a retired Hungarian foil fencer. She competed at the 1968, 1972 and 1976 Olympics and won three silver and one bronze medals. Her father Gyula Bóbis was an Olympic champion in wrestling.
