= Claudine le Comte =

Belgian fencer

Personal information
- Born: 27 February 1950 (age 76) Namur, Belgium

Sport
- Sport: Fencing

Claudine le Comte (born 27 February 1950) is a Belgian fencer. She competed in the women's individual foil events at the 1972 and 1976 Summer Olympics.
