= Ernst Seidl =

Austrian sailor

Personal information
- Nationality: Austrian
- Born: 29 January 1950 (age 75)

Sport
- Sport: Sailing

Ernst Seidl (born 29 January 1950) is an Austrian sailor. He competed at the 1972 Summer Olympics and the 1976 Summer Olympics.
