= Friss Újság =

Romanian daily newspaper issued in Hungarian language

- Type: Daily newspaper
- Format: Compact
- Publisher: Friss Press
- Founded: 1990
- Language: Hungarian
- Headquarters: Mihai Viteazu str., Nr. 32, Satu Mare
- Country: Romania
- Website: https://frissujsag.ro/

Friss Újság (Hungarian pronunciation: [ˈfriʃː ˈuːjʃaːɡ], Fresh Newspaper) is a Hungarian-language newspaper published in Romania by Friss Press. It is focused mainly on politics, public affairs, sports and economy. The first edition was printed in 1990.
