= Robert-Henri Regamey =

Swiss physician and microbiologist (1907–1978)

- Born: 30 September 1907; Henniez
- Died: 14 November 1978 (aged 71)
- Citizenship: Switzerland
- Education: University of Lausanne
- Scientific career
- Fields: Medical microbiology
- Workplaces: University of Geneva

Robert-Henri Regamey (30 September 1907 – 14 November 1978) was a Swiss physician and microbiologist. He held the chair in microbiology at the University of Geneva Faculty of Medicine from 1959. He is particularly known for his work on immunobiological standardization, and he served as a member of an expert committee on biological standardization appointed by the World Health Organization and co-founded the International Association of Biological Standardization.

Regamey completed his medical education at the University of Lausanne in 1933, and worked at the universities of Berne, Zurich and Lausanne for the next 15 years, mainly in the fields of bacteriology, pathology and infection control. In 1948 he became technical director of the Swiss Serum Institute in Berne, a position he held until joining the University of Geneva.
