= Erika Bethmann =

German fencer

Personal information
- Born: 31 August 1939 (age 86) Hamburg, Germany

Sport
- Sport: Fencing

Erika Bethmann (born 31 August 1939) is a German fencer. She competed in the women's team foil event at the 1972 Summer Olympics.
