= Helga Koch =

German fencer

Personal information
- Born: 3 January 1942 (age 84) Offenbach am Main, Nazi Germany

Sport
- Sport: Fencing

Helga Koch (born 3 January 1942) is a German former fencer. She competed in the women's team foil event at the 1968 Summer Olympics.
