= Silvana Sconciafurno =

Italian fencer (born 1941)

Personal information
- Born: 27 November 1941 (age 84) Tunis, Tunisia

Sport
- Sport: Fencing

Silvana Sconciafurno (born 27 November 1941) is an Italian fencer. She competed in the women's team foil event at the 1968 Summer Olympics.
