= Sally Anne Littlejohns =

British fencer

Personal information
- Born: 20 August 1948 (age 77)

Sport
- Sport: Fencing

Sally Anne Littlejohns (born 20 August 1948) is a British fencer. She competed in the women's team foil event at the 1972 Summer Olympics.
