= Natalia Clovis =

American fencer

Personal information
- Born: Natalia Lederer; 13 July 1943 (age 82) Havana, Cuba

Sport
- Sport: Fencing

Natalia Clovis (born July 13, 1943) is an American retired fencer and artist. She competed in the women's team foil event at the 1972 Summer Olympics. She became an artist after working in banking for 25 years. She studied in Europe and also worked with American sculptor Tony Lopez. She resides in Tucson, Arizona.
