= Ivonne Witteveen =

Dutch Antillean fencer (born 1944)

Personal information
- Born: 22 January 1944 (age 82) Curaçao, Netherlands Antilles

Sport
- Sport: Fencing

Ivonne Witteveen Kistemaker (born 22 January 1944) is a Dutch Antillean fencer. She competed in the women's individual foil event at the 1968 Summer Olympics.
