= Sonia Arredondo =

Mexican fencer

Personal information
- Born: 6 November 1947 (age 78) Monterrey, Mexico

Sport
- Sport: Fencing

Sonia Arredondo (born 6 November 1947) is a Mexican fencer. She competed in the women's team foil event at the 1968 Summer Olympics.
