= Christine McDougall =

Australian fencer

Personal information
- Born: 24 January 1951 (age 75)

Sport
- Sport: Fencing
- Club: VRI Fencing Club

Christine McDougall (born 24 January 1951) is an Australian fencer. She competed in the women's individual foil event at the 1972 Summer Olympics. She was a longstanding member of the Melbourne-based VRI Fencing Club.
