= Özden Ezinler =

Turkish fencer (born 1950)

Personal information
- Born: 24 July 1950 (age 75)

Sport
- Sport: Fencing
Medal record
Mediterranean Games
Silver medal – second place	1971 Izmir	Individual foil

Özden Ezinler (born 24 July 1950) is a Turkish fencer. She competed in the women's individual foil event at the 1972 Summer Olympics, at which she lost all five of her bouts. She won a silver medal at the 1971 Mediterranean Games in the individual foil event.
