= Rosa del Moral =

Mexican fencer

Personal information
- Born: 9 April 1936 (age 90) Pátzcuaro, Mexico

Sport
- Sport: Fencing

Rosa del Moral (born 9 April 1936) is a Mexican fencer. She competed in the women's individual and team foil events at the 1968 Summer Olympics.
