= Fabienne Regamey =

Swiss fencer

Personal information
- Born: 7 February 1952 (age 74)

Sport
- Sport: Fencing

Fabienne Regamey (born 7 February 1952) is a Swiss fencer. She competed in the women's individual foil event at the 1972 Summer Olympics.
