= Sylvia Iannuzzi-San Martín =

Argentine fencer

Personal information
- Born: 8 June 1947 (age 79) San Fernando, Buenos Aires, Argentina

Sport
- Sport: Fencing

Sylvia Iannuzzi-San Martín (born 8 June 1947) is an Argentine fencer. She competed in the women's individual foil events at the 1968 and 1972 Summer Olympics.
