= Kerstin Palm =

Swedish fencer

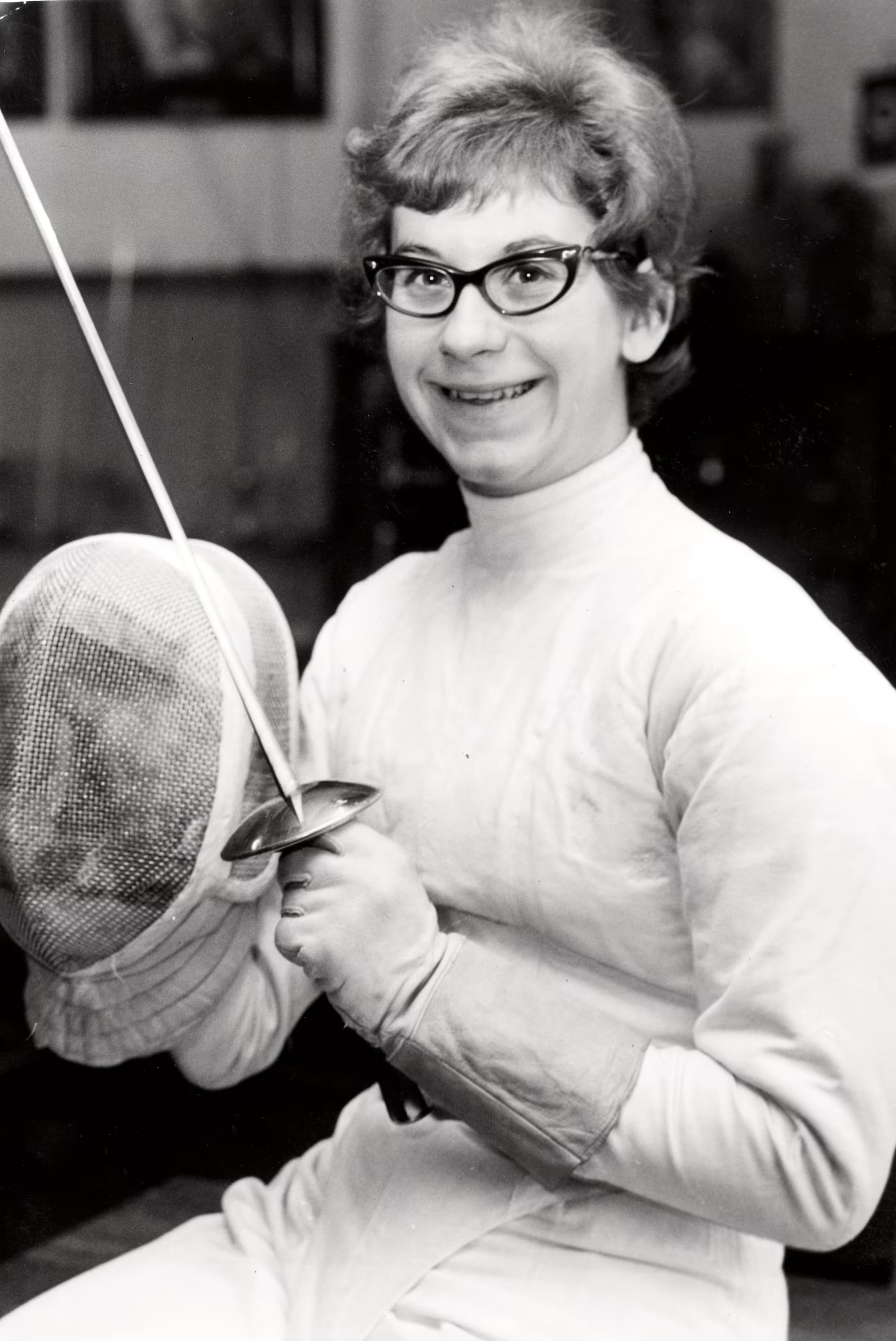
- Palm in 1965

Personal information
- Born: 5 February 1946 (age 80) Malmö, Sweden

Sport
- Sport: Fencing
- Club: Gothenburg FK (1964); FFF Stockholm (1968–76); FK Aramis (1980–88)
Medal record
Representing Sweden
Summer Universiade
Gold medal – first place	1967 Tokyo	Individual foil

Kerstin Ullasdotter Palm (born 5 February 1946) is a Swedish foil fencer. She competed in seven Summer Olympics, which is a record for a female fencer, with the best result of fifth in the individual foil event in 1968. She was named Sportswoman of the Year in Sweden in 1965.

Palm won the Nordic foil championships in 1961, aged 15, and held the junior world title in 1966; she also won approximately 40 Swedish fencing championships. She continued competing in fencing up to her seventies, while working as a dentist. She won the seniors world championship title in 2005 and 2007.

== See also ==
- List of athletes with the most appearances at Olympic Games
