= María Esther García =

Cuban fencer (born 1954)

Personal information
- Full name: María Esther García Pascau
- Born: 22 September 1954 (age 71)
- Height: 159 cm (5 ft 3 in)
- Weight: 50 kg (110 lb)

Sport
- Country: Cuba
- Sport: Fencing

María Esther García (born 22 September 1954) is a Cuban foil fencer. She competed at the 1972 and 1980 Summer Olympics.
