= Marlene Infante =

Cuban fencer (born 1952)

Personal information
- Born: 21 December 1952 (age 73)

Sport
- Sport: Fencing

Marlene Infante (born 21 December 1952) is a Cuban fencer. She competed in the women's individual and team foil events at the 1972 Summer Olympics.
