= Johann Summer =

Austrian cyclist

Personal information
- Born: 24 October 1951 (age 74) Dietersdorf am Gnasbach, Austria
- Height: 1.82 m (6 ft 0 in)

Cycling career
- Sport: Cycling

Johann Summer (born 24 October 1951) is an Austrian former cyclist. He competed at the 1972, 1976 and 1980 Summer Olympics. He won the Austrian National Road Race Championships in 1977.
