= Ruth White (fencer) =

American fencer

Personal information
- Born: July 16, 1951 (age 75) Baltimore, Maryland, United States

Sport
- Sport: Fencing
Medal record
Fencing
Representing United States
Pan American Games
Gold medal – first place	1971 Cali	Team
Silver medal – second place	1971 Cali	Individual

Ruth White (born July 16, 1951) is an American doctor and retired foil fencer.

== Life and career ==
White was born on July 16, 1951 in Baltimore, Maryland where she faced racial discrimination at school for being African-American.

In 1969, White became the first African-American to win a US fencing championship. She also competed at the 1971 Pan American Games where she won a gold medal in the team foil event and silver medal in the individual foil event.

She competed in fencing at New York University, coached by future Olympic coach Michel Sebastiani. She fenced on his women's team that won the 1971 National Intercollegiate Women's Fencing Association championship, as she won all 27 of her bouts. As Sebastiani confidently predicted she would to The New York Times – she went on to compete for Team USA at the 1972 Munich Olympics.

She was the first African-American women to represent the US in fencing at the Olympics. She competed in the women's individual and team foil events at the 1972 Munich Olympics.

Soon after she competed at the Olympics, White left fencing to go into medicine at the New York University School of Medicine and went on to work in internal medicine.

White was inducted into NYU's Hall of Fame in 1989, and into the USA Fencing Hall of Fame in 2001.

== See also ==
- List of USFA Hall of Fame members
