= Ann O'Donnell =

American fencer

Personal information
- Born: March 8, 1947 (age 79) Bayonne, New Jersey, United States

Sport
- Sport: Fencing

Ann O'Donnell (born March 8, 1947) is an American former foil fencer. She competed in the women's individual and team foil events at the 1972 and 1976 Summer Olympics.

== See also ==
- List of USFA Hall of Fame members
