= Adrienne Krebitz =

Austrian fencer

Personal information
- Born: 17 January 1947 (age 79)

Sport
- Sport: Fencing

Adrienne Krebitz (born 17 January 1947) is an Austrian fencer. She competed in the women's team foil event at the 1972 Summer Olympics.
