= Roman Humenberger =

Austrian cyclist

Personal information
- Born: 26 January 1945 (age 81)

Cycling career
- Sport: Cycling

Roman Humenberger (born 26 January 1945) is an Austrian former cyclist. He competed at the 1972 Summer Olympics and the 1976 Summer Olympics.
