= Mária Szolnoki =

Hungarian fencer (1947–2026)

Personal information
- Born: 16 June 1947 Budapest, Hungary
- Died: 19 October 2026 (aged 79) Budapest, Hungary

Sport
- Sport: Fencing
Medal record
Women's fencing
Representing Hungary
Olympic Games
Silver medal – second place	1972 Munich	Foil, Women's team

Mária Szolnoki (16 June 1947 – 19 October 2026) was a Hungarian fencer. She won a silver medal in the women's team foil at the 1972 Summer Olympics.

Szolnoki died in Budapest on 19 October 2026, at the age of 79.
