= Karin Rutz-Gießelmann =

German fencer

Personal information
- Born: 16 January 1948 (age 78) Offenburg, Allied-occupied Germany
- Height: 1.70 m (5 ft 7 in)
- Weight: 62 kg (137 lb)

Sport
- Sport: Fencing
- Club: FC Tauberbischofsheim
Medal record
World Fencing Championships
Silver medal – second place	1977 Buenos Aires	Team foil

Karin Rutz-Gießelmann (born 16 January 1948) is a German fencer who competed at the 1972 and 1976 Summer Olympics in foil events; her teams finished in fifth and fourth place, respectively. She won a silver team foil medal at the 1977 World Fencing Championships.
