= Madeleine Heitz =

Swiss fencer

Personal information
- Born: 25 February 1940 (age 86)

Sport
- Sport: Fencing

Madeleine Heitz (born 25 February 1940) is a Swiss fencer. She competed in the women's individual foil event at the 1972 Summer Olympics.
