= Galina Gorokhova =

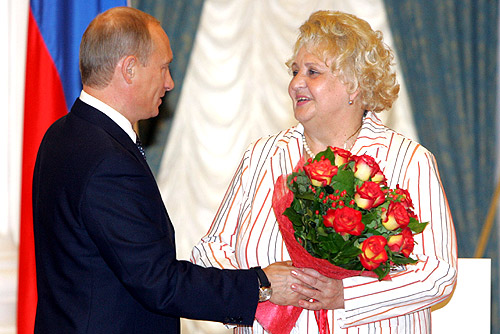

Personal information
- Born: 31 August 1938 (age 87) Moscow, Russian SFSR, Soviet Union
- Height: 1.68 m (5 ft 6 in)
- Weight: 59 kg (130 lb)

Sport
- Sport: Fencing
- Club: Dynamo Moscow
Medal record
Representing Soviet Union
Olympic Games
Gold medal – first place	1960 Rome	Team foil
Gold medal – first place	1968 Mexico City	Team foil
Gold medal – first place	1972 Munich	Team foil
Silver medal – second place	1964 Tokyo	Team foil
Bronze medal – third place	1972 Munich	Individual foil
World Fencing Championships
Gold medal – first place	1961	Team foil
Gold medal – first place	1963	Team foil
Gold medal – first place	1965	Team foil
Gold medal – first place	1966	Team foil
Gold medal – first place	1970	Team foil
Gold medal – first place	1971	Team foil
Gold medal – first place	1965	Individual foil
Gold medal – first place	1970	Individual foil
Silver medal – second place	1959	Individual foil
Silver medal – second place	1962	Individual foil
Silver medal – second place	1962	Team foil
Silver medal – second place	1967	Team foil
Silver medal – second place	1969	Team foil
Bronze medal – third place	1966	Individual foil

Galina Yevgenyevna Gorokhova (Russian: Галина Евгеньевна Горохова; born 31 August 1938) is a Russian and former Soviet retired fencer and five-time Olympic medalist, as well as a nine-time world gold medalist. She is also the coach of the Russian Olympic fencing team.

She is a laureate of the national sports award of the Ministry of Sport of Russia, in the nomination "Epoch in Sport".
