= Irmela Broniecki =

German fencer

Personal information
- Born: 26 April 1944 Speyer, Germany
- Died: 3 December 2019 (aged 75)

Sport
- Sport: Fencing

Irmela Broniecki (26 April 1944 – 3 December 2019) was a German fencer. She competed in the women's individual and team foil events at the 1972 Summer Olympics.
