= Hannelore Hradez =

Austrian fencer

Personal information
- Born: 30 December 1940
- Died: 12 September 2022 (aged 81) Fugging, Upper Austria
- Height: 165 cm (5 ft 5 in)
- Weight: 60 kg (132 lb)

Sport
- Sport: Fencing

Hannelore Hradez (30 December 1940 – 12 September 2022) was an Austrian fencer. She competed in the women's individual and team foil events at the 1972 Summer Olympics.
