= Waltraut Peck-Repa =

Austrian fencer and artist

Waltraut Repa-Peck
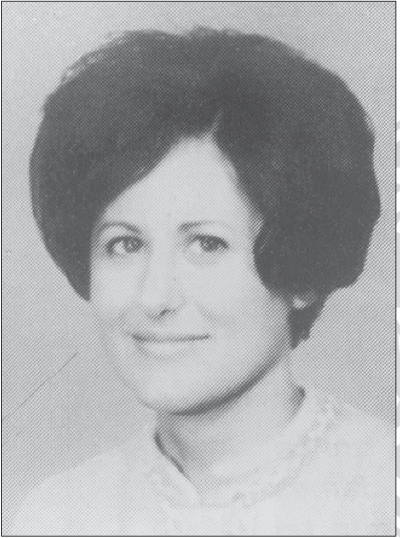

Personal information
- Full name: Waltraut Repa-Peck
- Nationality: Austrian
- Born: Peck; 2 September 1940 Vienna, Nazi Germany
- Died: 14 November 1998 (aged 58) Vienna, Austria

Sport
- Country: Austria
- Sport: Fencing
- Club: Wiener Sport Club
- Retired: 1972

Achievements and titles
- National finals: Five times National Champion, three times vice-champion (foil)

Waltraut Repa-Peck (2 September 1940 – 14 November 1998) was an Austrian foil fencer and academic artist. She competed at the 1960 and 1972 Summer Olympics.
