= Monika Pulch =

German fencer

Personal information
- Born: 23 May 1949 (age 77) Essen, West Germany

Sport
- Sport: Fencing

Monika Pulch (born 23 May 1949) is a German fencer. She competed at the 1968 and 1972 Summer Olympics.
