= Ingrid Gosch =

Austrian fencer

Personal information
- Born: 2 October 1949 (age 76)

Sport
- Sport: Fencing

Ingrid Gosch (born 2 October 1949) is an Austrian fencer. She competed in the women's team foil event at the 1972 Summer Olympics.
