= Alexandra Zabelina =

Soviet fencer (1937–2022)

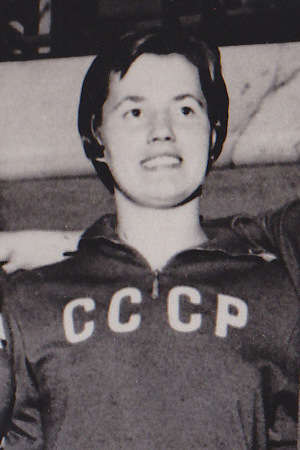
- Zabelina in 1960

Personal information
- Born: 11 March 1937 Moscow, Russian SFSR, Soviet Union
- Died: 27 March 2022 (aged 85)
- Height: 1.57 m (5 ft 2 in)
- Weight: 58 kg (128 lb)

Sport
- Sport: Fencing
- Club: Dynamo Moscow
- Coached by: Lev Saychuk
Medal record
Representing Soviet Union
Olympic Games
Gold medal – first place	1960 Rome	Foil, team
Gold medal – first place	1968 Mexico City	Foil, team
Gold medal – first place	1972 Munich	Foil, team
World Fencing Championships
Gold medal – first place	1956 London	Foil, team
Gold medal – first place	1957 Paris	Foil, individual
Gold medal – first place	1961 Turin	Foil, team
Gold medal – first place	1963 Gdansk	Foil, team
Gold medal – first place	1965 Paris	Foil, team
Gold medal – first place	1966 Moscow	Foil, team
Gold medal – first place	1967 Montreal	Foil, individual
Gold medal – first place	1970 Ankara	Foil, team
Gold medal – first place	1971 Viena	Foil, team

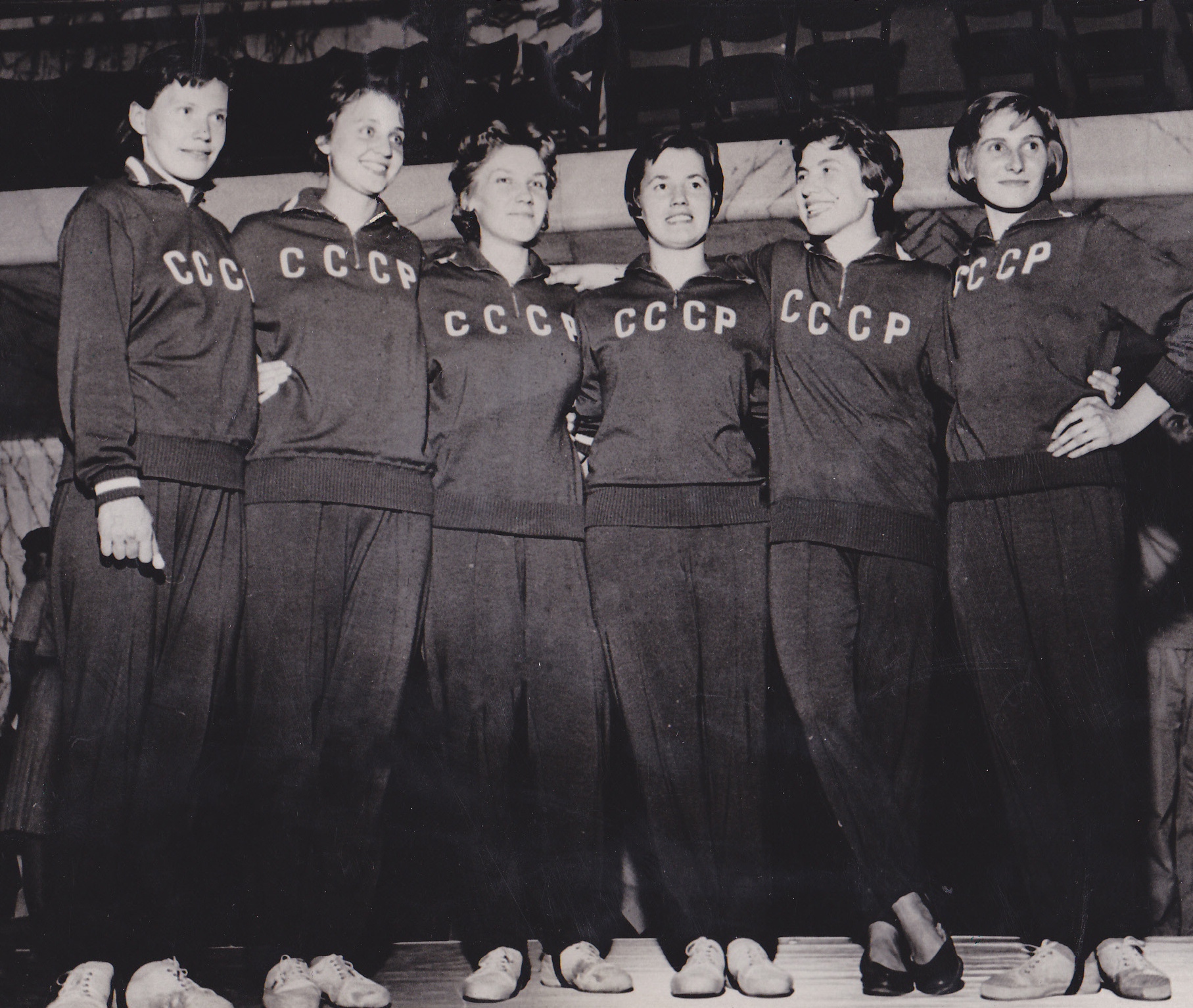
Soviet foil team at the 1960 Olympics; Zabelina is third from right

Alexandra Ivanovna Zabelina (Russian: Александра Ивановна Забелина; 11 March 1937 – 27 March 2022) was a Soviet fencer. She won 8 team gold medals in the team foil at the 1960, 1968 and 1972 Summer Olympics.

Between 1956 and 1971 Zabelina won eight team and two individual world titles in the foil. She won the individual Silver Prize at the 1961 and 1966 world championships and team Silver Prize in 1959, 1962, 1967, and 1969. She missed the 1964 Summer Olympics because she was expecting her son.

Zabelina first trained in gymnastics, but had to quit due to an injury. In retirement she worked as a fencing coach. Her students included the Olympic champion Maria Mazina.
