= Elke Radlingmaier =

Austrian fencer

Personal information
- Born: 15 September 1943 (age 82)

Sport
- Sport: Fencing

Elke Radlingmaier (born 15 September 1943) is an Austrian fencer. She competed in the women's individual and team foil events at the 1972 Summer Olympics.
