= Giulia Lorenzoni =

Italian fencer (born 1940)

Personal information
- Born: 11 March 1940 (age 86) Brescia, Italy

Sport
- Sport: Fencing

Giulia Lorenzoni (born 11 March 1940) is an Italian fencer. She competed at the 1968, 1972 and 1976 Summer Olympics.
