= Elena Belova =

Elena Belova may refer to:

- Elena Belova (biathlete) (born 1965), Russian Olympic biathlete in 1992
- Elena Belova (fencer) (born 1947), Russian fencer
- Elena Belova (footballer) (born 1985), Uzbekistani goalkeeper and coach
- Elena Belova (physicist) (fl. 1980s–2020s), Soviet-American plasma physicist

== See also ==
- Yelena Belova, a fictional character in American comic books published by Marvel Comics
