= Harriet King (fencer) =

American fencer (born 1935)

Personal information
- Born: September 22, 1935 (age 90) New York City, New York, U.S.

Sport
- Sport: Fencing

Harriet King (born September 22, 1935) is an American fencer: a four-time Olympian, gold and silver medalist at the Pan American Games, four-time US National Individual Foil Champion, and five-time National Team Champion. She competed in the 1960, 1964, 1968, and 1972 Summer Olympics. She won silver individual medals at the 1963 and 1967 Pan American Games and gold team medals at the 1959, 1963, 1967, and 1971 Pan Ams. She was National Women’s Foil Champion in 1963, 1967, 1970, and 1971. She has been elected to the USA Fencing Hall of Fame and the Hunter College Athletic Hall of Fame.

Harriet King was born and raised in New York City and graduated from Hunter College High School and Hunter College, Phi Beta Kappa. After graduation, she moved to San Francisco, where she became a copywriter, copy chief, and creative director at major ad agencies. In 1990, she moved to San Diego to co-found two publications, San Diego Bride and Groom and San Diego This Week, both the most-read in their fields. She continued as Publisher until retiring in 2009.

In retirement, King raises champion Scottish Deerhounds and also Borzoi.
