= Olga Szabó-Orbán =

Romanian fencer (1938–2022)

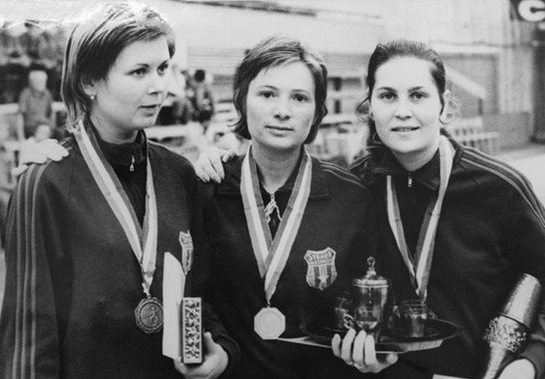
- Orbán (left) in the 1960s

Personal information
- Born: 9 October 1938 Cluj, Romania
- Died: 5 January 2022 (aged 83) Bârzava, Romania

Fencing career
- Sport: Fencing
- Weapon: Foil
- Hand: right-handed
- National coach: Andrei Vâlcea
- Club: CSA Steaua
Medal record
Women's Foil
Representing Romania
Olympic Games
| Silver medal – second place | 1956 Melbourne | Individual |
| Bronze medal – third place | 1968 Mexico | Team |
| Bronze medal – third place | 1972 Munich | Team |
World Championships
| Gold medal – first place | 1962 Buenos Aires | Individual |
| Gold medal – first place | 1969 Havana | Team |
| Silver medal – second place | 1965 Paris | Individual |
| Silver medal – second place | 1965 Paris | Team |
| Silver medal – second place | 1970 Ankara | Team |
| Bronze medal – third place | 1961 Turin | Team |
| Bronze medal – third place | 1967 Montreal | Team |
| Bronze medal – third place | 1970 Ankara | Individual |
Summer Universiade
| Gold medal – first place | 1961 Sofia | Team |
| Silver medal – second place | 1961 Sofia | Individual |
| Silver medal – second place | 1965 Budapest | Team |

Olga Szabó-Orbán (née Orbán, 9 October 1938 – 5 January 2022) was a Romanian foil fencer, world champion in 1962, and team world champion in 1969. A five-time Olympian, she won an individual silver medal in 1956 and team bronze medals in 1968 and 1972.

== Career ==
Orbán was born into a Hungarian minority in Transylvania. She took up fencing at the relatively late age of 14 after her teacher Ecaterina Bartoș led the whole class to the fencing hall, where her husband Tibor was a coach. Her talent became rapidly apparent and she was placed under the responsibility of coach Ludovic Ozoray at club Progresul Cluj. She won in 1954 her first national championship in the junior category, followed in 1955 by a title in the senior category.

At the 1956 Olympics she earned a silver medal, the first Olympic medal in fencing for Romania. The gold medal went to Great Britain's Gillian Sheen, whom Orbán had beaten twice during the event. In 1961 Orbán won with Maria Vicol, Ana Pascu and Ecaterina Orb-Lazăr Romania's first medal at the World Fencing Championships with a team bronze medal, followed in 1962 by an individual gold medal. After retiring from competitions Orbán became a fencing coach at her club CSA Steaua. In 1990 she moved to Hungary with her husband, Olympic water polo player Alexandru Szabó, and later worked at the Budapest Honvéd sport club.

== Personal life and death ==
Olga Szabó-Orbán died in January 2022, at the age of 83.
