= Halina Balon =

Polish fencer

Personal information
- Born: 18 April 1948 (age 78) Katowice, Poland

Sport
- Sport: Fencing

Halina Balon (born 18 April 1948) is a Polish fencer. She competed in the women's individual and team foil events at the 1968 and 1972 Summer Olympics.
