= Kamilla Składanowska =

Polish fencer (1948–2010)

Personal information
- Born: 12 January 1948 Warsaw, Poland
- Died: 9 September 2010 (aged 62) Warsaw, Poland

Sport
- Sport: Fencing

Kamilla Składanowska (12 January 1948 – 9 September 2010) was a Polish fencer. She competed at the 1968, 1972, 1976 and 1980 Summer Olympics.
