= Marie-Chantal Depetris-Demaille =

French fencer (1941–2025)

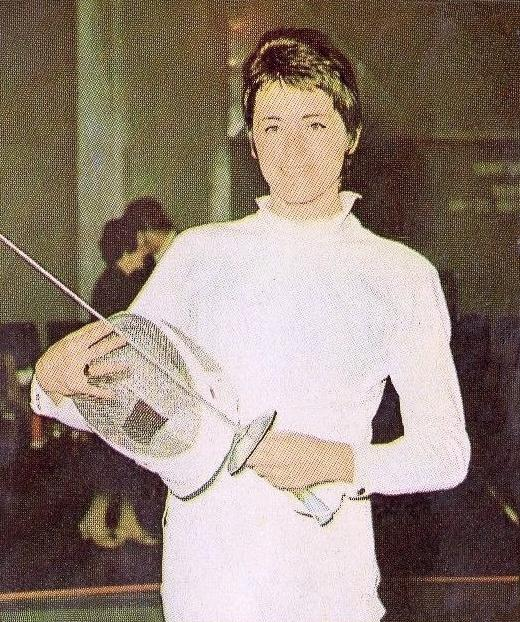
- Demaille in 1972

Personal information
- Born: 17 December 1941 Saint-Fraimbault, German-occupied France
- Died: 18 February 2025 (aged 83)
- Height: 5 ft 5 in (1.65 m)

Sport
- Country: France
- Sport: Fencing
Medal record
World Fencing Championships
Gold medal – first place	1971 Vienna	Individual foil
Mediterranean Games
Gold medal – first place	1971 Izmir	Individual foil

Marie-Chantal Depetris-Demaille (17 December 1941 – 18 February 2025) was a French foil fencer. She competed at the 1964, 1968, and 1972 Summer Olympics. She also competed at the 1971 Mediterranean Games where she won a gold medal in the individual foil event. Deptris-Demaiile also won gold in the same event at the 1971 World Fencing Championships in Vienna.

Depetris-Demaille died on 18 February 2025, at the age of 83.
