= Elżbieta Franke-Cymerman =

Polish fencer (born 1940)

Personal information
- Born: 10 March 1940 (age 86) Klimontów, Poland

Sport
- Sport: Fencing
Medal record
Representing Poland
World Championships
Bronze medal – third place	1971 Vienna	Team foil
Summer Universiade
Silver medal – second place	1965 Budapest	Individual foil

Elżbieta Franke-Cymerman (born 10 March 1940) is a Polish fencer. She competed in the women's individual and team foil events at the 1968 and 1972 Summer Olympics.
