= Catherine Rousselet-Ceretti =

French fencer

Personal information
- Born: 17 May 1943 (age 83) Paris, France

Sport
- Sport: Fencing

Catherine Rousselet-Ceretti (born 17 May 1943) is a French fencer. She competed in the women's individual and team foil events at the 1964, 1968 and 1972 Summer Olympics.
