= Antonella Ragno-Lonzi =

Italian fencer (born 1940)

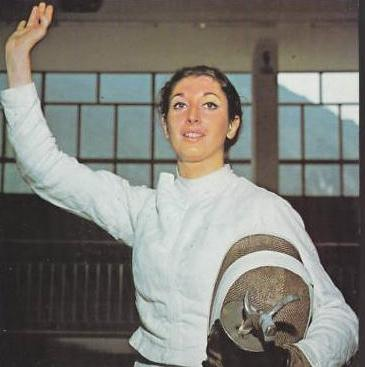

Personal information
- Born: 6 June 1940 (age 86) Venezia, Italy

Sport
- Sport: Fencing
Medal record
Women's fencing
Representing Italy
Olympic Games
Gold medal – first place	1972 Munich	Foil Individual
Bronze medal – third place	1960 Rome	Foil Team
Bronze medal – third place	1964 Tokyo	Foil Individual

Antonella Ragno-Lonzi (born 6 June 1940) is an Italian fencer and Olympic champion in foil competition.

== Biography ==
She received a gold medal in foil at the 1972 Summer Olympics in Munich and a bronze at the 1960 and 1964 Summer Olympics. She is married to Gianni Lonzi, Italy's 1960 Olympic gold medalist in the men's water polo.

== See also ==
- Italian sportswomen multiple medalists at Olympics and World Championships
