= 1967 World Fencing Championships =

International fencing competition

1967 World Championships in Fencing
- Host city: Montreal, Canada

The 1967 World Fencing Championships were held in Montreal, Quebec, Canada. The event took place from July 5 to July 16, 1967.

== Medal table ==
Rank	Nation	Gold	Silver	Bronze	Total
1	Soviet Union (URS)	6	3	0	9
2	Hungary (HUN)	1	2	3	6
3	Romania (ROU)	1	0	1	2
4	France (FRA)	0	1	2	3
5	Poland (Polish People's Republic)	0	1	1	2
6	Italy (ITA)	0	1	0	1
7	Austria (AUT)	0	0	1	1
Totals (7 entries)		8	8	8	24

== Medal summary ==
=== Men's events ===
Event	Gold	Silver	Bronze
Individual Foil	(Soviet Union) Viktor Putyatin	(Hungarian People's Republic) Jenő Kamuti	(France) Bernard Talvard
Team Foil	(Socialist Republic of Romania) Romania	Soviet Union	(Polish People's Republic) Poland
Individual Sabre	(Soviet Union) Mark Rakita	(Polish People's Republic) Jerzy Pawłowski	(Hungarian People's Republic) Tibor Pézsa
Team Sabre	Soviet Union	(Hungarian People's Republic) Hungary	France
Individual Épée	(Soviet Union) Aleksey Nikanchikov	(Soviet Union) Grigory Kriss	(Austria) Rudolf Trost
Team Épée	Soviet Union	France	(Hungarian People's Republic) Hungary

=== Women's events ===
Event	Gold	Silver	Bronze
Individual Foil	(Soviet Union) Alexandra Zabelina	(Italy) Antonella Ragno-Lonzi	(Hungarian People's Republic) Ildikó Farkasinszky-Bóbis
Team Foil	(Hungarian People's Republic) Hungary	Soviet Union	(Socialist Republic of Romania) Romania
