= Ileana Gyulai-Drîmbă-Jenei =

Romanian fencer (1946–2021)

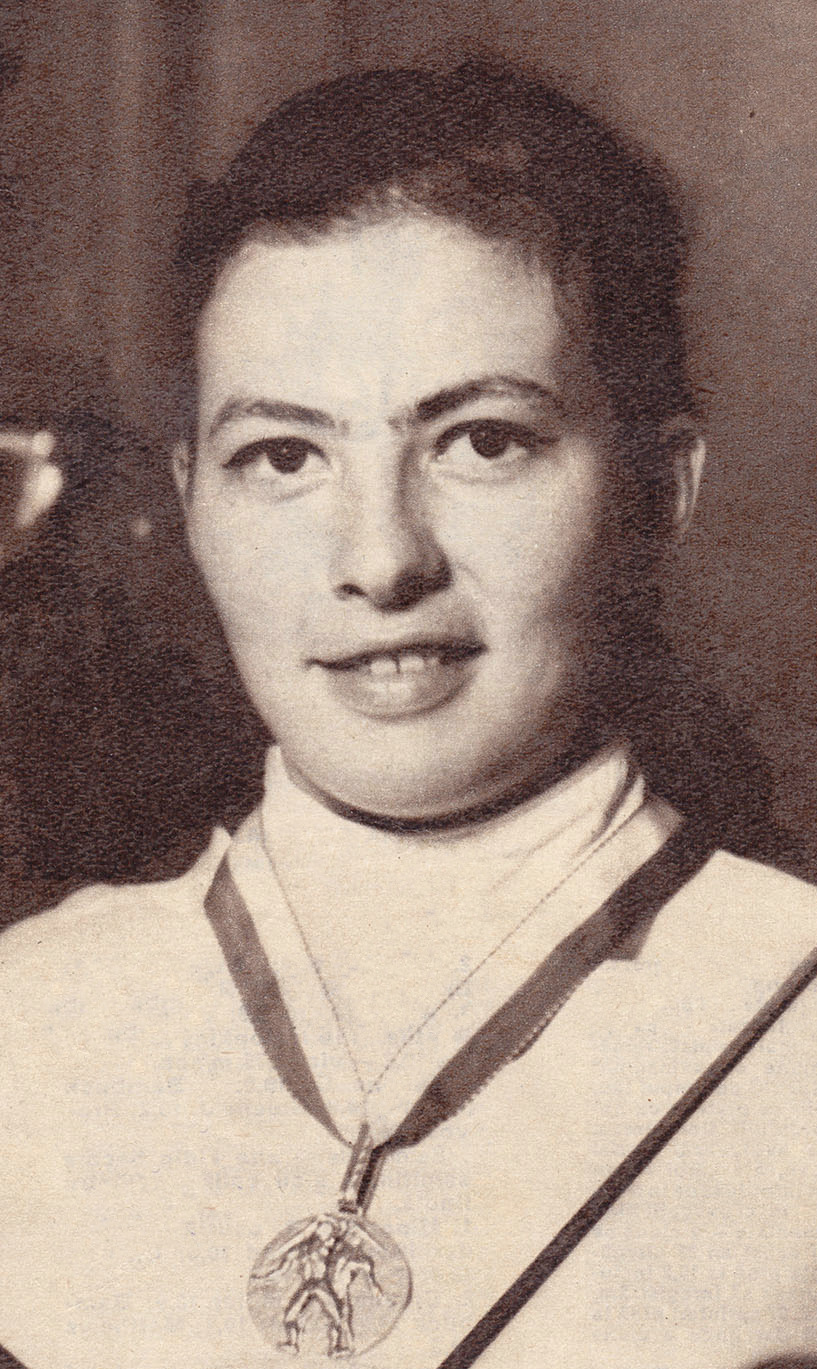

Personal information
- Nationality: Romanian
- Born: Ilona Gyulai; 12 June 1946 Cluj-Napoca, Cluj County, Romania
- Died: 25 August 2021 (aged 75) Oradea, Romania
- Height: 164 cm (5 ft 5 in)
- Weight: 61 kg (134 lb)

Sport
- Country: Romania
- Sport: Fencing
- Event: Foil
- Club: Steaua, București
- Coached by: Alexandru Csipler; Andrei Valcea

Achievements and titles
- Olympic finals: Bronze, foil team (1968, 1972)
Medal record
Representing Romania
Olympic Games
Bronze medal – third place	1968 Mexico City	Foil, team
Bronze medal – third place	1972 Munich	Foil, team
World Championships
Silver medal – second place	1965 Paris	Foil, team
Bronze medal – third place	1967 Montreal	Foil, team
Gold medal – first place	1969 Havana	Foil, team
Silver medal – second place	1969 Havana	Foil, ind
Silver medal – second place	1970 Ankara	Foil, team
Bronze medal – third place	1973 Gothenburg	Foil, team
Bronze medal – third place	1974 Grenoble	Foil, team

Ileana Gyulai-Drîmbă-Jenei (born Ilona Gyulai; 12 June 1946 – 25 August 2021) was a Romanian foil fencer. She competed at the 1964, 1968, 1972 and 1976 Olympics and won team bronze medals in 1968 and 1972, placing fifth in 1964.

She was married to the fellow Olympic fencer Ion Drîmbă, but later divorced and married football player and coach Emerich Jenei; they had a daughter named Cristina.
