= Poland at the 1960 Summer Olympics =

- IOC code: POL
- NOC: Polish Olympic Committee

in Rome, Italy 25 August 1960 – 11 September 1960
- Competitors: 185 (156 men and 29 women) in 17 sports
- Flag bearer: Teodor Kocerka
- Medals Ranked 9th: Gold 4 Silver 6 Bronze 11 Total 21

Summer Olympics appearances (overview)
- 1924; 1928; 1932; 1936; 1948; 1952; 1956; 1960; 1964; 1968; 1972; 1976; 1980; 1984; 1988; 1992; 1996; 2000; 2004; 2008; 2012; 2016; 2020; 2024; 2028

Other related appearances
- Russian Empire (1900, 1912); Austria (1908–1912)

Poland competed at the 1960 Summer Olympics in Rome, Italy. 185 competitors, 156 men and 29 women, took part in 108 events in 17 sports.

== Gold ==
- Zdzisław Krzyszkowiak — Athletics, men's 3000 metres steeplechase
- Józef Szmidt — Athletics, men's Triple jump
- Kazimierz Paździor — Boxing, men's Lightweight
- Ireneusz Paliński — Weightlifting, men's Light-heavyweight

== Silver ==
- Elżbieta Krzesińska — Athletics, women's Long jump
- Jarosława Jóźwiakowska — Athletics, women's High jump
- Jerzy Adamski — Boxing, men's Featherweight
- Tadeusz Walasek — Boxing, men's Middleweight
- Zbigniew Pietrzykowski — Boxing, men's Light heavyweight
- Andrzej Piątkowski, Emil Ochyra, Wojciech Zabłocki, Jerzy Pawłowski, Ryszard Zub, Marian Kuszewski, — Fencing, men's team sabre

== Bronze ==
- Kazimierz Zimny — Athletics, men's 5000 metres
- Tadeusz Rut — Athletics, men's Hammer throw
- Teresa Wieczorek, Barbara Janiszewska, Celina Jesionowska, Halina Richter — Athletics, women's 4×100 metres relay
- Brunon Bendig — Boxing, men's Bantamweight
- Marian Kasprzyk — Boxing, men's Light welterweight
- Leszek Drogosz — Boxing, men's Welterweight
- Daniela Walkowiak — Canoeing, women's K-1 500 metres
- Stefan Kapłaniak, Władysław Zieliński — Canoeing, men's K-2 1000 metres
- Teodor Kocerka — Rowing, men's single sculls
- Jan Bochenek — Weightlifting, men's Light-heavyweight
- Tadeusz Trojanowski — Wrestling, men's Freestyle Bantamweight

== Athletics ==
Men
Track & road events

Athlete	Event	Heat		Quarterfinal		Semifinal		Final	
Athlete	Event	Result	Rank	Result	Rank	Result	Rank	Result	Rank
Jerzy Chromik	3000 m steeplechase	9:06.68	7	—N/a				Did not advance	
Marian Foik	100 m	10.5	1 Q	10.4	3 Q	10.5	4	Did not advance	
Marian Foik	200 m	21.1	1 Q	20.9	2 Q	21.0	2 Q	20.8	4
Marian Jochman	5000 m	14:31.29	8	—N/a				Did not advance	
Jerzy Kowalski	400 m	48.3	2 Q	46.7	4	Did not advance			
Wiesław Król	400 m hurdles	52.52	5	Did not advance					
Zdzisław Krzyszkowiak	10000 m	—N/a						28:52.75	7
Zdzisław Krzyszkowiak	3000 m steeplechase	8:49.92	1 Q	—N/a				8:34.30 OR	Gold medal
Zdzisław Kumiszcze	400 m hurdles	53.47	5	Did not advance					
Stefan Lewandowski	800 m	1:51.75	4	Did not advance					
Stefan Lewandowski	1500 m	3:59.75	11	Did not advance					
Zbigniew Makomaski	800 m	1:52.70	3 Q	1:51.72	4	Did not advance			
Roman Muzyk	110 m hurdles	14.94	3 Q	14.68	4	Did not advance			
Zbigniew Orywał	800 m	1:55.89	6	Did not advance					
Zbigniew Orywał	1500 m	DNF		Did not advance					
Stanisław Ożóg	10000 m	—N/a						29:58.00	18
Stanisław Swatowski	400 m	48.1	3 Q	47.4	5	Did not advance			
Kazimierz Zimny	5000 m	14:07.75	3 Q	—N/a				13:45.09	Bronze medal
Kazimierz Zimny	10000 m	—N/a						DNF	
Marian Foik; Jan Jarzembowski; Józef Szmidt; Jerzy Juskowiak	4 × 100 m relay	40.73	DSQ	Did not advance					
Edward Bożek; Stanisław Swatowski; Bogusław Gierajewski; Jerzy Kowalski	4 × 400 m relay	3:09.67	2 Q	—N/a		3:10.88	4	Did not advance	

Field events

Athlete	Event	Qualification		Final	
Athlete	Event	Distance	Position	Distance	Position
Zenon Begier	Discus throw	53.03	14 Q	53.18	14
Olgierd Ciepły	Hammer throw	60.61	14 Q	64.57	5
Janusz Gronowski	Pole vault	4.20	18	Did not advance	
Jan Jaskólski	Triple jump	15.04	24	Did not advance	
Kazimierz Kropidłowski	Long jump	7.37	16	Did not advance	
Andrzej Krzesiński	Pole vault	4.20	12 Q	4.30	12
Eugeniusz Kwiatkowski	Shot Put	16.71	16	Did not advance	
Ryszard Malcherczyk	Triple jump	15.93	3 Q	16.01	6
Edmund Piątkowski	Discus throw	54.41	5	55.12	5
Zbigniew Radziwonowicz	Javelin throw	74.86	10 Q	77.31	7
Tadeusz Rut	Hammer throw	60.73	13 Q	65.64	Bronze medal
Janusz Sidło	Javelin throw	85.14	1 Q	76.46	8
Piotr Sobotta	High jump	2.00	12 Q	2.00	15
Alfred Sosgórnik	Shot Put	17.06	10 Q	17.57	6
Józef Szmidt	Triple jump	16.44 OR	1 Q	16.81 OR	Gold medal

Women
Track & road events

Athlete	Event	Heat		Quarterfinal		Semifinal		Final	
Athlete	Event	Result	Rank	Result	Rank	Result	Rank	Result	Rank
Teresa Ciepły-Wieczorek	100 m	12.25	3 Q	12.14	3 Q	12.05	5	Did not advance	
Teresa Ciepły-Wieczorek	80 m hurdles	11.46	2 Q	—N/a		11.40	5	Did not advance	
Celina Jesionowska	200 m	24.45	2 Q	—N/a		25.45	6	Did not advance	
Barbara Lerczak-Janiszewska-Sobotta	200 m	24.08	1 Q	—N/a		24.36	3 Q	24.96	5
Krystyna Nowakowska	800 m	2:09.81	3	—N/a				Did not advance	
Halina Richter-Górecka-Herrmann	100 m	12.13	3 Q	12.10	3 Q	11.93	4	Did not advance	
Halina Richter-Górecka-Herrmann	200 m	24.31	4	—N/a		Did not advance			
Barbara Sosgórnik	80 m hurdles	11.56	2 Q	—N/a		11.46	6	Did not advance	
Zofia Walasek	800 m	2:16.44	6	—N/a				Did not advance	
Beata Żbikowska	800 m	2:09.57	2 2	—N/a				2:11.91	8
Teresa Ciepły-Wieczorek; Barbara Lerczak-Janiszewska-Sobotta; Celina Jesionowska; Halina Richter-Górecka-Herrmann	4 × 100 m relay	45.40	3 Q	—N/a				45.19	Bronze medal

Field events

Athlete	Event	Qualification		Final	
Athlete	Event	Distance	Position	Distance	Position
Urszula Figwer	Javelin throw	48.04	13 Q	52.33	5
Jarosława Jóźwiakowska	High jump	1.65	4 Q	1.71	Silver medal
Jadwiga Klimaj	Shot Put	14.85	9 Q	14.66	10
Elżbieta Duńska-Krzesińska	Long jump	6.13	4 Q	6.27	Silver medal
Maria Kusion	Long jump	5.92	11 Q	5.86	13
Maria Chojnacka	Long jump	5.95	10 Q	5.98	11
Eugenia Rusin	Shot Put	14.50	12 Q	14.55	11
Kazimiera Rykowska	Discus throw	46.75	13	Did not advance	

== Basketball ==
=== Roster ===
Poland

- Andrzej Nartowski
- Andrzej Pstrokoński
- Bohdan Przywarski
- Dariusz Świerczewski
- Janusz Wichowski
- Jerzy Młynarczyk
- Jerzy Piskun
- Krzysztof Sitkowski
- Mieczysław Łopatka
- Ryszard Olszewski
- Tadeusz Pacuła
- Zbigniew Dregier

=== Preliminary round ===
Group D

Team	Pld	W	L	PF	PA	PD	Pts
Uruguay	3	2	1	228	225	+3	5
Poland	3	2	1	233	207	+26	5
Philippines	3	1	2	228	248	−20	4
Spain	3	1	2	222	231	−9	4

26 August
14:30

Philippines	68–86	Poland
Scoring by half: 31–44, 37–42
Pts: Badion (17)		Pts: Nartowski (29)

Palazzetto dello sport, Rome
Referees: V. Pinto (Italy)
E. Kassai (Hungary)

27 August
20:00

Uruguay	76–72	Poland
Scoring by half: 39–38, 37–34
Pts: Poyet (15)		Pts: Wichowski (29)

Palazzetto dello sport, Rome
Referees: E. Alvarez Frausto (Mexico)
E. Luglini (Italy)

29 August
16:00

Poland	100–63	Spain
Scoring by half: 36–29, 64–35
Pts: Korneev (18)		Pts: Vicens (14)

Palazzetto dello sport, Rome
Referees: E. Kassai (Hungary)
V. Pinto (Italy)

=== Semifinals ===
Pool A

Team	Pld	W	L	PF	PA	PD	Pts
Brazil	3	3	0	240	221	+19	6
Italy	3	2	1	226	216	−10	5
Czechoslovakia	3	1	2	236	237	−1	4
Poland	3	0	3	211	239	−28	3

1 September
23:00

Czechoslovakia	88–75	Poland
Scoring by half: 44–30, 44–45
Pts: Baumruk (18)		Pts: Wichowski (24)

Palazzetto dello sport, Rome
Referees: E. Kassai (Hungary)
Aznar (Spain)

2 September
20:00

Brazil	77–68	Poland
Scoring by half: 39–46, 38–22
Pts: Baumruk, Konecny (18)		Pts: Wichowski (24)

Palazzetto dello sport, Rome
Referees: B. Takev (Bulgaria)
Harvey (New Zealand)

3 September
20:00

Italy	74–68	Poland
Scoring by half: 40–32, 34–36
Pts: Alesini (12)		Pts: Wichowski (16)

Palazzetto dello sport, Rome
Referees: Bilek (Turkey)
T. Hata (Japan)

==== Classification 5–8 ====
Team	Pld	W	L	PF	PA	PD	Pts
Czechoslovakia	3	3	0	284	240	+44	6
Yugoslavia	3	2	1	282	262	+20	5
Poland	3	1	2	220	245	−25	4
Uruguay	3	0	3	217	256	−39	3

7 September
23:30

Yugoslavia	95–81	Poland
Scoring by half: 55–44, 40–37
Pts: Korac (33)		Pts: Wichowski (24)

Palazzo dello Sport, Rome
Referees: R. Righetto (Brazil)
G. Follati (Italy)

9 September
21:00

Poland	64–62	Uruguay
Scoring by half: 35–31, 29–31
Pts: Sitkowski (14)		Pts: Blixen (18)

Palazzo dello Sport, Rome
Referees: R. Weber (Switzerland)
B. Takev (Bulgaria)

== Boxing ==
Men

Athlete	Event	1 Round	2 Round	3 Round	Quarterfinals	Semifinals	Final	
Athlete	Event	Opposition Result	Opposition Result	Opposition Result	Opposition Result	Opposition Result	Rank	
Henryk Kukier	Flyweight	BYE	Manfred Homberg (EUA); L 0–5	Did not advance				
Brunon Bendig	Bantamweight	BYE	John Sentongo (UGA); W 5–0	Jan de Rooij (NED); W 5–0	Horst Rascher (EUA); W 3–2	Oleg Grigoryev (URS); L 1–4	Did not advance	Bronze medal
Jerzy Adamski	Featherweight	—N/a	Sumith Liyanage (CEY); W 5–0	Shinetsu Suzuki (JPN); W 5–0	Ernest Chervet (SUI); W 5–0	William Meyers (RSA); W 4–1	Francesco Musso (ITA); L 1–4	Silver medal
Kazimierz Paździor	Lightweight	BYE	Taha Abdul Karim (IRQ); W 5–0	Harry Lempio (EUA); W 4–1	Salah Shokweir (EGY); W 5–0	Richard McTaggart (GBR); W 3–2	Sandro Lopopolo (ITA); W 4–1	Gold medal
Marian Kasprzyk	Light-Welterweight	BYE	Carmelo García (ESP); W KO 2:20	György Pál (HUN); W 5–0	Vladimir Yengibaryan (URS); W 5–0	Clement Quartey (GHA); L WO	Did not advance	Bronze medal
Leszek Drogosz	Welterweight	BYE	Benny Nielsen (DEN); W 5–0	Ghasem Yavarkandi (IRI); W 5–0	Henry Loubscher (RSA); W 5–0	Yuri Radonyak (URS); L 2–3	Did not advance	Bronze medal
Henryk Dampc	Light Middleweight	—N/a	Leif Otto Hansen (DEN); W 4–1	Michael Reid (IRL); W 5–0	William Fisher (GBR); L 1–4	Did not advance		5
Tadeusz Walasek	Middleweight	—N/a	Sultan Mahmoud (PAK); W 5–0	Teifion Davies (AUS); W 5–0	Frik Van Rooyen (RSA); W 5–0	Yevgeny Feofanov (URS); W 4–1	Eddie Crook Jr. (USA); L 2–3	Silver medal
Zbigniew Pietrzykowski	Light Heavyweight	—N/a	Carl Crawford (GUY); W 5–0	Emil Willer (EUA); W 5–0	Petar Spasov (BUL); W 5–0	Giulio Saraudi (ITA); W 4–1	Cassius Clay (USA); L 0–5	Silver medal
Władysław Jędrzejewski	Heavyweight	—N/a	BYE	Daniel Bekker (RSA); L RSC1	Did not advance			

== Canoeing ==
=== Sprint ===
Men

Athlete	Event	Heats		Repechages		Semifinals		Final	
Athlete	Event	Time	Rank	Time	Rank	Time	Rank	Time	Rank
Ryszard Skwarski	K-1 1000 m	4:12.70	5 R	4:06.99	1 Q	4:09.26	5	Did not advance	
Stefan Kapłaniak; Władysław Zieliński	K-2 1000 m	3:39.41	3 Q	BYE		3:48.62	1 Q	3:37.34	Bronze medal
Stefan Kapłaniak; Władysław Zieliński; Ryszard Skwarski; Ryszard Marchlik	K-1 4 × 500 metres	8:06.98	4 R	8:06.80	2 Q	7:57.54	2 Q	7:49.93	4

Women

Athlete	Event	Heats		Repechages		Semifinals		Final	
Athlete	Event	Time	Rank	Time	Rank	Time	Rank	Time	Rank
Daniela Walkowiak	K-1 500 m	2:15.34	1 Q	BYE		2:11.07	1 Q	2:15.68	Bronze medal
Daniela Walkowiak; Janina Mendalska	K-2 500 m	2:01.03	1 Q	BYE		—N/a		1:59.03	4

== Cycling ==
Five male cyclists represented Poland in 1960.

Road

Athlete	Event	Time	Rank
Jan Chtiej	Men's road race	4:25:44	54
Bogusław Fornalczyk	Men's road race	4:20:57	11
Stanisław Gazda	Men's road race	4:20:57	6
Wiesław Podobas	Men's road race	DNF	
Bogusław Fornalczyk; Wiesław Podobas; Jan Chtiej; Mieczysław Wilczewski	Team time trial	2:23:44.16	10

== Diving ==
Men

Athlete	Event	Preliminaries		Semifinal				Final	
Athlete	Event	Points	Rank	Points	Rank	Points	Rank	Points	Rank
Jerzy Kowalewski	3 m springboard	46.54	25	Did not advance					
Jerzy Kowalewski	10m platform	51.24	12 Q	35.98	15	87.22	15	Did not advance	

== Equestrian ==
=== Eventing ===
Athlete	Horse	Event	Dressage		Cross-country			Jumping			Total	
Athlete	Horse	Event	Dressage		Cross-country			Final			Total	
Athlete	Horse	Event	Penalties	Rank	Penalties	Total	Rank	Penalties	Total	Rank	Penalties	Rank
Marian Babirecki	Volt	Individual	(-127,00)	33	61.60	7	65.40	0	(-20.00)	20	85,40	8
Andrzej Kobyliński	Wolborz	Individual	(-124,00)	28	DSQ			Did not finish				
Andrzej Orłoś	Krokosz	Individual	(-135,51)	42	(-22.00)	19	(-157.91)	Did not finish			Did not finish	
Marek Roszczynialski	Wizma	Individual	(-153,51)	59	DSQ			Did not finish				
Marian Babirecki; Andrzej Kobyliński; Andrzej Orłoś; Marek Roszczynialski	See above	Team	(-386.51)	12	39.60	AC	(-92.51)	0	(-20.00)	AC	Did not finish	

== Fencing ==
21 fencers, 16 men and 5 women, represented Poland in 1960.

=== Men ===
Athlete	Event	Round 1		Round 2		Quarterfinal		Semifinal		Final	
Athlete	Event	Opposition Result	Rank	Opposition Result	Rank	Opposition Result	Rank	Opposition Result	Rank	Opposition Result	Rank
Bogdan Gonsior	Men's épée		3 Q		4 Q		4	Did not advance			13
Wiesław Glos	Men's épée		3 Q		3 Q		5	Did not advance			17
Janusz Kurczab	Men's épée		2 Q		1 Q		4	Did not advance			13
Jerzy Strzałka; Wiesław Glos; Bogdan Gonsior; Janusz Kurczab; Andrzej Kryński	Team épée	Spain; W 9–7; Belgium; W 8-8	1 Q	Luxembourg; L 8-8		Did not advance					9
Ryszard Parulski	Men's foil		2 Q		2 Q		1 Q		6	Did not advance	11
Janusz Różycki	Men's foil		1 Q		4 Q		2 Q		5	Did not advance	9
Witold Woyda	Men's foil		1 Q		1 Q		3 Q		2 Q		4
Witold Woyda; Ryszard Parulski; Janusz Różycki; Egon Franke; Ryszard Kunze	Team foil	Morocco; W 16–0; United States; L 4–9; United Team of Germany; W 9–7	2 Q	Egypt; W 9–3		Soviet Union; L 6–9		Did not advance			5
Jerzy Pawłowski	Men's sabre		1 Q		2 Q		2 Q		1 Q		6
Wojciech Zabłocki	Men's sabre		1 Q		1 Q		1 Q		4 Q		5
Ryszard Zub	Men's sabre		2 Q		1 Q	Rylsky (URS) W 5–4; Ferrari (ITA) L 2–5; Horváth (HUN) L 1–5; Van Der Auwera (BEL) L 4–5; Morales (USA) W 5–3	4	Did not advance			13
Emil Ochyra; Jerzy Pawłowski; Wojciech Zabłocki; Marek Kuszewski; Ryszard Zub; Andrzej Piątkowski	Team sabre	Japan; W 14–2; Austria; W 9–3	1 Q	BYE		United Team of Germany; W 9–2		United States; W 9–3		Hungary; L 7–9	Silver medal

=== Women ===
Athlete	Event	Elimination round		Quarterfinal		Semifinal		Final	
Athlete	Event	Opposition Result	Rank	Opposition Result	Rank	Opposition Result	Rank	Opposition Result	Rank
Wanda Fukała-Kaczmarczyk	Women's foil	Orban-Szabo (ROU) L 0–4; Kleijweg (NED) L 1–4; Ragno-Lonzi (ITA) L 2–4; Melchers (BEL); Undapp (INA)	5	Did not advance					37
Sylwia Julito	Women's foil	Sákovicsné Dömölky (HUN) W 4–2; Grötzer (AUT) W 4–1; York-Romary (USA) L 0–4; Moulin (FIN) W 4–2; Leal (VEN) W 4–0	1 Q	Vicol (ROU) L 0–4; Rastvorova (URS) L 2–4; Ságiné Ujlakyné Rejtő (HUN) L 3–4; Ragno-Lonzi (ITA); Botbijl (NED) W 4–2	5	Did not advance			17
Elżbieta Pawlas	Women's foil	Camber-Corno (ITA) W 4–0; Leroux (FRA) L 1–4; Stafford (GBR) W 4–2; Gnauer (AUT) W 4–3; Sander (VEN) W 4–0	1 Q	Delbarre (FRA) L 1–4; Orb-Lazăr (ROU) L 2–4; Sheen (GBR) W 4–2; Sákovicsné Dömölky (HUN) W 4–2; Kleijweg (NED) W 4–2; Appart (BEL) W 4–2	2 Q	Schmid (EUA); Orb-Lazăr (ROU); Rastvorova (URS) W 4–2; Nyári-Kovács (HUN) W 4–1; Orb-Lazăr (ROU) W 4–1	2 Q	Schmid (EUA) W 4–2; Rastvorova (URS) L 0–4; Vicol (ROU) L 1–4; Gorokhova (URS) L 0–4; Orb-Lazăr (ROU) L 2–4; Roldán (HUN) W 4–0; Ebert (AUT) L 3–4	6
Sylwia Julito; Barbara Orzechowska-Ryszel; Genowefa Migas-Stawarz; Elżbieta Pawlas; Wanda Fukała-Kaczmarczyk	Team foil	United States; W 8-8; France; W 9–6	1 Q	Italy; L 5–9		Did not advance			5

== Football ==
=== Roster ===
Poland

Coach: Czesław Krug

- Lucjan Brychczy
- Eugeniusz Faber
- Stefan Florenski
- Stanisław Fołtyn
- Zygmunt Gadecki
- Ryszard Grzegorczyk
- Henryk Grzybowski
- Stanisław Hachorek
- Engelbert Jarek
- Roman Lentner
- Marian Norkowski
- Hubert Pala
- Ernest Pol
- Henryk Szczepański
- Edward Szymkowiak
- Tomasz Stefaniszyn
- Marceli Strzykalski
- Edmund Zientara
- Jerzy Woźniak

=== Group play ===
Group C

Team	Pld	W	D	L	GF	GA	GD	Pts
Denmark	3	3	0	0	8	4	+4	6
Argentina	3	2	0	1	6	4	+2	4
Poland	3	1	0	2	7	5	+2	2
Tunisia	3	0	0	3	3	11	−8	0

26 August 1960
13:00

Poland	6–1	Tunisia
Pohl 7', 40', 42', 84', 89'; Hachorek 67'	Report	Kerrit 3'

Rome
Attendance: 3,000
Referee: Lo Bello (ITA)

29 August 1960
12:00

Denmark	2–1	Poland
H. Nielsen 15'; Pedersen 86'	Report	Gadecki 62'

Livorno
Attendance: 3,700
Referee: Lo Bello (ITA)

1 September 1960
12:00

Argentina	2–0	Poland
Oleniak 38'; Pérez 55'	Report

Naples
Attendance: 10,000
Referee: S. Garan (TUR)

=== Final ranking ===
Rank	Team	Pld	W	D	L	GF	GA	GD	Pts
1	Yugoslavia	5	3	2	0	17	6	+1	8
2	Denmark	5	4	0	1	11	7	+4	8
3	Hungary	5	4	0	1	17	6	+11	8
4	Italy	5	2	2	1	11	7	+4	6
5	Bulgaria	3	2	1	0	8	3	+5	5
6	Brazil	3	2	0	1	10	6	+4	4
7	Argentina	3	2	0	1	6	4	+2	4
8	Great Britain	3	1	1	1	8	8	0	3
9	France	3	1	1	1	3	9	–6	3
10	Poland	3	1	0	2	7	5	+2	2
11	Peru	3	1	0	2	6	9	–3	2
12	Egypt	3	0	1	2	4	11	–7	1
13	India	3	0	1	2	3	6	–3	2
14	Turkey	3	0	1	2	3	10	–7	2
15	Tunisia	3	0	0	3	3	11	–8	1
16	Formosa	3	0	0	3	3	12	–9	1

== Gymnastics ==
=== Artistic ===
Men

Athlete	Event	Final Standings								Apparatus Final							
Athlete	Event	Apparatus						Total	Rank	Apparatus						Total	Rank
Athlete	Event	F	PH	R	V	PB	HB	Total	Rank	F	PH	R	V	PB	HB	Total	Rank
Ernest Hawełek	All-around	18.05	17.95	18.25	18.00	17.80	18.50	108.55	60	Did not advance							
Jerzy Jokiel	All-around	18.90	17.80	18.00	18.00	18.10	17.65	108.45	61	Did not advance							
Andrzej Konopka	All-around	18.50	17.95	18.45	17.45	18.35	18.50	109.20	46	Did not advance							
Alfred Kucharczyk	All-around	18.70	17.95	17.60	17.95	18.25	18.25	108.70	56	Did not advance							
Józef Rajnisz	All-around	17.35	18.50	18.70	17.70	17.05	18.05	107.35	72	Did not advance							
Aleksander Rokosa	All-around	18.20	17.50	18.60	16.55	18.55	17.40	106.80	74	Did not advance							
Ernest Hawełek; Jerzy Jokiel; Andrzej Konopka; Alfred Kucharczyk; Józef Rajnisz; Aleksander Rokosa	Team all-around	92.35	90.35	92.15	89.35	91.10	91.30	546.60	10	—N/a							

Women

Athlete	Event	Final Standings						Apparatus Final					
Athlete	Event	Apparatus				Total	Rank	Apparatus				Total	Rank
Athlete	Event	F	V	UB	BB	Total	Rank	F	V	UB	BB	Total	Rank
Brygida Dziuba	All-around	18.800	17.933	17.899	17.266	71.898	52	Did not advance					
Barbara Eustachiewicz	All-around	18.600	17.999	18.466	18.233	73.298	24	Did not advance					
Natalia Kot	All-around	19.066	18.466	18.999	18.333	74.864	12	Did not advance					
Eryka Mondry-Kost	All-around	18.566	17.699	18.199	18.300	72.764	32	Did not advance					
Gizela Niedurny	All-around	18.832	17.866	18.966	16.983	72.647	37	Did not advance					
Danuta Nowak-Stachow	All-around	19.066	18.099	18.533	18.232	73.930	17	Did not advance					
Brygida Dziuba; Barbara Eustachiewicz; Natalia Kot; Eryka Mondry-Kost; Gizela Niedurny; Danuta Nowak-Stachow	Team all-around	94.430	90.563	93.163	90.464	368.620	5	—N/a					

== Field hockey ==
=== Roster ===
Poland

- Alfons Flinik
- Czesław Kubiak
- Henryk Flinik
- Jan Flinik
- Jan Górny
- Kazimierz Dąbrowski
- Leon Wiśniewski
- Narcyz Maciaszczyk
- Roman Micał
- Ryszard Marzec
- Władysław Śmigielski
- Włodzimierz Różański
- Zdzisław Wojdylak

=== Group B ===
26 August
15:00

Poland	2–1 (1–0)	Japan
Flinik 33'; Wiśniewski 56'		Iijima 68'

Stadio dei Marmi
Umpires:
Lichtenfeld (GER), Schinner (GER)

29 August
16:30

Pakistan	8–0 (4–0)	Poland
H. Abdul 6', 24', 55'; Noor 18'; Mutti 22'; W. Abdul 45', 69'; Nasir 60'

Stadio dei Marmi
Umpires:
Whitelaw (GBR), McIldowie (RSA)

1 September
16:30

Australia	1–1 (0–0)	Poland
Crossman 62'		Kubiak 48' (ps)

Olympic Velodrome
Umpires:
Asselman (BEL), de Bourguignon (BEL)

Group standings

Team	Pld	W	D	L	GF	GA	Pts
Pakistan	3	3	0	0	21	0	6
Australia	3	1	1	1	9	5	3
Poland	3	1	1	1	3	10	3
Japan	3	0	0	3	2	20	0

Pakistan advanced to the quarter-finals. Australia and Poland played a tie-breaker match to determine second place in the group. Japan continued to the classification matches for 13th–16th place.

3 September
08:30

Australia	2–0 (0–0)	Poland
Crossman 55'; Currie 66'

Campo Tre Fontane
Umpires:
McIldowie (RSA), Whitelaw (GBR)

Australia advanced to the quarter-finals. Poland continued to the classification matches for 9th–12th place.

=== Ninth to twelfth place ===
Poland declined to participate in the classification matches and was therefore awarded twelfth place. The other three teams played a round-robin set of matches.

== Modern pentathlon ==
Three male pentathletes represented Poland in the 1960 Games.

Athlete	Event	Riding (show jumping)	Fencing (épée one touch)	Shooting (10 m air pistol)	Swimming (200 m freestyle)	Running (3000 m)	Total points	Final rank
Athlete	Event	Points	Points	Points	Points	Points	Total points	Final rank
Kazimierz Mazur	Individual	1129	586	960	710	1126	4511	20
Kazimierz Paszkiewicz	Individual	1075	563	840	1010	1108	4596	14
Stanisław Przybylski	Individual	1111	747	860	815	1198	4731	7
Stanisław Przybylski; Kazimierz Paszkiewicz; Kazimierz Mazur	Team	3315	1804	2660	2535	3432	13746	5

== Rowing ==
Poland had five male rowers participate in two out of seven rowing events in 1960.

Men

Athlete	Event	Heats		Repechage		Final	
Athlete	Event	Time	Rank	Time	Rank	Time	Rank
Teodor Kocerka	Single sculls	7:33.38	3 R	7:24.31	1 Q	7:21.26	Bronze medal
Benedykt Augustyniak; Kazimierz Neumann; Bogdan Poniatowski; Antoni Rosołowicz	Coxless four	6:34.20	3 R	6:48.50	3	—N/a	11

== Shooting ==
Men

Athlete	Event	Qualification		Final	
Athlete	Event	Score	Rank	Score	Rank
Henryk Górski	Men's 300 metre rifle three positions	543	26 Q	1098	17
Henryk Górski	Men's 50 metre rifle prone	384	32 Q	583	13
Jerzy Nowicki	Men's 50 metre rifle three positions	565	3 Q	1137	5
Jerzy Nowicki	Men's 50 metre rifle prone	381	49 Q	579	26
Stefan Masztak	Men's 300 metre rifle three positions	550	16 Q	1105	13
Stanisław Romik	50 m pistol	365	4 Q	548	5
Adam Smelczyński	Trap	88	24 Q	184	7
Andrzej Tomza	50 m pistol	347	29 Q	530	28
Czesław Zając	25 m rapid fire pistol	—N/a		582	7

== Swimming ==
Men

Athlete	Event	Heat		Semifinal		Final	
Athlete	Event	Time	Rank	Time	Rank	Time	Rank
Bernard Aluchna	100 metre freestyle	57.9	4 Q	57.8	6	Did not advance	
Andrzej Kłopotowski	200 metre breaststroke	2:41.4	2 Q	2:40.8	4 Q	2:41.2	7
Jan Lutomski	400 metre freestyle	4:42.8	5	—N/a		Did not advance	
Andrzej Salamon	100 metre freestyle	56.5	2 Q	56.9	3	Did not advance	
Jerzy Tracz	400 metre freestyle	4:38.6	3	—N/a		Did not advance	
Andrzej Salamon; Bernard Aluchna; Jerzy Tracz; Jan Lutomski	4 x 200 metre freestyle	8:32.0	9	—N/a		Did not advance	

== Weightlifting ==
Men

Athlete	Event	Military Press		Snatch		Clean & Jerk		Total	Rank
Athlete	Event	Result	Rank	Result	Rank	Result	Rank	Total	Rank
Marian Jankowski	56 kg	92,5	8	100	4	192.5	4	322.5	5
Marian Zieliński	67,5 kg	115	4	110	5	150	2	375	4
Waldemar Baszanowski	67,5 kg	105	19	117.5	2	147.5	4	370	5
Krzysztof Siemion	75 kg	135	2	117.5	8	147.5	11	400	5
Ireneusz Paliński	82,5 kg	130	2	132.5	1 OR	180	1 WR	442.5	Gold medal
Jan Bochenek	82,5 kg	130	2	120	7	170	2	420	Bronze medal
Czesław Białas	90 kg	130	9	122.5	9	157.5	9	410	7

== Wrestling ==
Men's freestyle

Athlete	Event	Elimination Pool						Final round	
Athlete	Event	Round 1 Result	Round 2 Result	Round 3 Result	Round 4 Result	Round 5 Result	Round 6 Result	Final round Result	Rank
Lesław Kropp	−52 kg	Jorge Rosado Garcia (MEX); W T 5:46	André Georges Zoete (FRA); L T 3:57	Mohamed Ibrahim Seifpour Saidabadi (IRI); L T 6:02	Did not advance				11
Tadeusz Trojanowski	−57 kg	Paul Hänni (FIN); W T 4:24	Geoffrey Jameson (AUS); W T 4:25	Alfred Kammerer (EUA); W P	BYE	Neżdet Zalew (BUL); L P	Terrence McCann (USA); L P	—N/a	Bronze medal
Jan Żurawski	−62 kg	Tamiji Sato (JPN); L P	Abraham Geldenhuys (RSA); W P	Muhammad Akhtar (PAK); L P	Did not advance				12
Jan Kuczyński	−67 kg	Władimir Siniawskij (URS); L P	Kazuo Abe (JPN); L T 6:26	Did not advance					20
Lucjan Sosnowski	+87 kg	Hamit Kaplan (TUR); L T 6:49	BYE	Pietro Marascalchi (ITA); L T 7:45	Did not advance				10

Men's Greco-Roman

Athlete	Event	Elimination Pool						Final round	
Athlete	Event	Round 1 Result	Round 2 Result	Round 3 Result	Round 4 Result	Round 5 Result	Round 6 Result	Final round Result	Rank
Stefan Hajduk	−52 kg	Heikki Hakola (FIN); L E	Jørgen Jensen (NOR); W P	Mohamed Paziraie (IRI); L P	Did not advance				10
Bernard Knitter	−57 kg	Gilberto Gramellini (ITA); L P	Reino Tuominen (FIN); W T 4:09	Masamitsu Ichiguchi (JPN); W E	Imre Hodos (HUN); W T 11:35	Ion Cernea (ROU); L P	Did not advance		7
Kazimierz Macioch	−62 kg	Rudolf Pedersen (DEN); L P	Müzahir Sille (TUR); L P	Did not advance					19
Ernest Gondzik	−67 kg	Erik Thomsen (DEN); W P	Dimităr Stojanow Janczew (BUL); L E	Ramazan Gungor (TUR); W E	Mitsuharu Kitamura (JPN); L E	Did not advance			5
Edward Żuławnik	−73 kg	René Schiermeyer (FRA); W T 10:22	Sam Azoulay (MAR); L WO	Did not advance					25
Bolesław Dubicki	−79 kg	Oddvar Barlie (NOR); L E	Hammou Haddaoui Khadir (MAR); W T 5:44	Pentti Punkari (FIN); W P	Ion Taranu (ROU); L E	Kazim Ayvaz (TUR); W E	Pentti Punkari (FIN); D	Did not advance	5
Włodzimierz Smoliński	−87 kg	Krali Bimbalow Pejczev (BUL); L P	Antonio Cerroni (ITA); W P	Tevfik Kis (TUR); L P	Did not advance				11
Lucjan Sosnowski	+87 kg	Viktor Ahven (FIN); W P	Kanji Shigeoka (JPN); W T 2:39	Radoslaw Kasabow Petrow (BUL); L E	István Kozma (HUN); L P	Did not advance			5
