= Wrestling at the 1964 Summer Olympics – Men's Greco-Roman featherweight =

Wrestling at the Olympics

Men's Greco-Roman featherweight at the Games of the XVIII Olympiad
- Venue: Komazawa Gymnasium
- Dates: 16–19 October 1964
- Competitors: 27 from 27 nations

Medalists
| 1st place, gold medalist(s) | | Imre Polyák | Hungary |
| 2nd place, silver medalist(s) | | Roman Rurua | Soviet Union |
| 3rd place, bronze medalist(s) | | Branko Martinović | Yugoslavia |

The men's Greco-Roman featherweight competition at the 1964 Summer Olympics in Tokyo took place from 16 to 19 October at the Komazawa Gymnasium. Nations were limited to one competitor. Featherweight was the third-lightest category, including wrestlers weighing 57 to 63 kilograms (125.7 to 138.9 lb).

== Competition format ==
This Greco-Roman wrestling competition continued to use the "bad points" elimination system introduced at the 1928 Summer Olympics for Greco-Roman and at the 1932 Summer Olympics for freestyle wrestling, as adjusted at the 1960 Summer Olympics. Each bout awarded 4 points. If the victory was by fall, the winner received 0 and the loser 4. If the victory was by decision, the winner received 1 and the loser 3. If the bout was tied, each wrestler received 2 points. A wrestler who accumulated 6 or more points was eliminated. Rounds continued until there were 3 or fewer uneliminated wrestlers. If only 1 wrestler remained, he received the gold medal. If 2 wrestlers remained, point totals were ignored and they faced each other for gold and silver (if they had already wrestled each other, that result was used). If 3 wrestlers remained, point totals were ignored and a round-robin was held among those 3 to determine medals (with previous head-to-head results, if any, counting for this round-robin).

== Results ==
=== Round 1 ===
Bouts

| Winner | Nation | Victory Type | Loser | Nation |
|---|---|---|---|---|
| Rasoul Mir Malek | Iran | Decision | Moustafa Hamil Mansour | Egypt |
| Erik Olsson | Sweden | Decision | Marin Bolocan | Romania |
| Branko Martinović | Yugoslavia | Fall | Nour Aka Sayed | Afghanistan |
| Lothar Schneider | United Team of Germany | Tie | Dinko Petrov | Bulgaria |
| Kyösti Lehtonen | Finland | Fall | Rubén Leibovich | Argentina |
| Svend Skrydstrup | Denmark | Tie | Müzahir Sille | Turkey |
| Roman Rurua | Soviet Union | Decision | Kazimierz Macioch | Poland |
| Jef Mewis | Belgium | Fall | Bandu Patil | India |
| Hans Marte | Austria | Fall | Antonio Senosa | Philippines |
| Koji Sakurama | Japan | Decision | Mario Tovar | Mexico |
| Petros Galaktopoulos | Greece | Decision | Kim Bong-jo | South Korea |
| Imre Polyák | Hungary | Decision | Ronald Finley | United States |
| Matti Jutila | Canada | Tie | Don Cacas | Australia |
| Georges Ballery | Austria | Bye | N/A | N/A |

Points

| Rank | Wrestler | Nation | R1 |
|---|---|---|---|
| 1 | Georges Ballery | France | 0 |
| 1 | Kyösti Lehtonen | Finland | 0 |
| 1 | Hans Marte | Austria | 0 |
| 1 | Branko Martinović | Yugoslavia | 0 |
| 1 | Jef Mewis | Belgium | 0 |
| 6 | Petros Galaktopoulos | Greece | 1 |
| 6 | Rasoul Mir Malek | Iran | 1 |
| 6 | Erik Olsson | Sweden | 1 |
| 6 | Imre Polyák | Hungary | 1 |
| 6 | Roman Rurua | Soviet Union | 1 |
| 6 | Koji Sakurama | Japan | 1 |
| 12 | Don Cacas | Australia | 2 |
| 12 | Matti Jutila | Canada | 2 |
| 12 | Dinko Petrov | Bulgaria | 2 |
| 12 | Lothar Schneider | United Team of Germany | 2 |
| 12 | Müzahir Sille | Turkey | 2 |
| 12 | Svend Skrydstrup | Denmark | 2 |
| 18 | Marin Bolocan | Romania | 3 |
| 18 | Ronald Finley | United States | 3 |
| 18 | Kim Bong-jo | South Korea | 3 |
| 18 | Kazimierz Macioch | Poland | 3 |
| 18 | Moustafa Hamil Mansour | Egypt | 3 |
| 18 | Mario Tovar | Mexico | 3 |
| 24 | Rubén Leibovich | Argentina | 4 |
| 24 | Bandu Patil | India | 4 |
| 24 | Nour Aka Sayed | Afghanistan | 4 |
| 24 | Antonio Senosa | Philippines | 4 |

=== Round 2 ===
The field was narrowed from 27 to 19 in round 2. Mewis was the only wrestler with 0 points.

Bouts

| Winner | Nation | Victory Type | Loser | Nation |
|---|---|---|---|---|
| Moustafa Hamil Mansour | Egypt | Decision | Georges Ballery | Austria |
| Kazimierz Macioch | Poland | Default | Bandu Patil | India |
| Koji Sakurama | Japan | Fall | Antonio Senosa | Philippines |
| Rasoul Mir Malek | Iran | Tie | Erik Olsson | Sweden |
| Marin Bolocan | Romania | Fall | Nour Aka Sayed | Afghanistan |
| Jef Mewis | Belgium | Default | Mario Tovar | Mexico |
| Hans Marte | Austria | Decision | Petros Galaktopoulos | Greece |
| Imre Polyák | Hungary | Fall | Kim Bong-jo | South Korea |
| Branko Martinović | Yugoslavia | Tie | Lothar Schneider | United Team of Germany |
| Ronald Finley | United States | Default | Matti Jutila | Canada |
| Dinko Petrov | Bulgaria | Tie | Kyösti Lehtonen | Finland |
| Roman Rurua | Soviet Union | Fall | Müzahir Sille | Turkey |
| Svend Skrydstrup | Denmark | Foul | Rubén Leibovich | Argentina |
| Don Cacas | Australia | Bye | N/A | N/A |

Points

| Rank | Wrestler | Nation | R1 | R2 | Total |
|---|---|---|---|---|---|
| 1 | Jef Mewis | Belgium | 0 | 0 | 0 |
| 2 | Hans Marte | Austria | 0 | 1 | 1 |
| 2 | Imre Polyák | Hungary | 1 | 0 | 1 |
| 2 | Roman Rurua | Soviet Union | 1 | 0 | 1 |
| 2 | Koji Sakurama | Japan | 1 | 0 | 1 |
| 6 | Don Cacas | Australia | 2 | 0 | 2 |
| 6 | Kyösti Lehtonen | Finland | 0 | 2 | 2 |
| 6 | Branko Martinović | Yugoslavia | 0 | 2 | 2 |
| 6 | Svend Skrydstrup | Denmark | 2 | 0 | 2 |
| 10 | Georges Ballery | France | 0 | 3 | 3 |
| 10 | Marin Bolocan | Romania | 3 | 0 | 3 |
| 10 | Ronald Finley | United States | 3 | 0 | 3 |
| 10 | Kazimierz Macioch | Poland | 3 | 0 | 3 |
| 10 | Rasoul Mir Malek | Iran | 1 | 2 | 3 |
| 10 | Erik Olsson | Sweden | 1 | 2 | 3 |
| 16 | Petros Galaktopoulos | Greece | 1 | 3 | 4 |
| 16 | Moustafa Hamil Mansour | Egypt | 3 | 1 | 4 |
| 16 | Dinko Petrov | Bulgaria | 2 | 2 | 4 |
| 16 | Lothar Schneider | United Team of Germany | 2 | 2 | 4 |
| 20 | Matti Jutila | Canada | 2 | 4 | 6 |
| 20 | Müzahir Sille | Turkey | 2 | 4 | 6 |
| 22 | Kim Bong-jo | South Korea | 3 | 4 | 7 |
| 22 | Mario Tovar | Mexico | 3 | 4 | 7 |
| 24 | Rubén Leibovich | Argentina | 4 | 4 | 8 |
| 24 | Bandu Patil | India | 4 | 4 | 8 |
| 24 | Nour Aka Sayed | Afghanistan | 4 | 4 | 8 |
| 24 | Antonio Senosa | Philippines | 4 | 4 | 8 |

=== Round 3 ===
Only four of the 19 wrestlers were eliminated in this round, but 5 men had 5 points after the round. Lehtonen withdrew. Polyák took over the lead at 1 point after Mewis's loss.

Bouts

| Winner | Nation | Victory Type | Loser | Nation |
|---|---|---|---|---|
| Georges Ballery | Austria | Decision | Don Cacas | Australia |
| Moustafa Hamil Mansour | Egypt | Decision | Erik Olsson | Sweden |
| Rasoul Mir Malek | Iran | Tie | Marin Bolocan | Romania |
| Branko Martinović | Yugoslavia | Default | Dinko Petrov | Bulgaria |
| Kyösti Lehtonen | Finland | Decision | Lothar Schneider | United Team of Germany |
| Roman Rurua | Soviet Union | Decision | Svend Skrydstrup | Denmark |
| Kazimierz Macioch | Poland | Decision | Jef Mewis | Belgium |
| Koji Sakurama | Japan | Decision | Hans Marte | Austria |
| Imre Polyák | Hungary | Fall | Petros Galaktopoulos | Greece |
| Ronald Finley | United States | Bye | N/A | N/A |

Points

| Rank | Wrestler | Nation | R1 | R2 | R3 | Total |
|---|---|---|---|---|---|---|
| 1 | Imre Polyák | Hungary | 1 | 0 | 0 | 1 |
| 2 | Branko Martinović | Yugoslavia | 0 | 2 | 0 | 2 |
| 2 | Roman Rurua | Soviet Union | 1 | 0 | 1 | 2 |
| 2 | Koji Sakurama | Japan | 1 | 0 | 1 | 2 |
| 5 | Ronald Finley | United States | 3 | 0 | 0 | 3 |
| 5 | Jef Mewis | Belgium | 0 | 0 | 3 | 3 |
| 7 | Georges Ballery | France | 0 | 3 | 1 | 4 |
| 7 | Kazimierz Macioch | Poland | 3 | 0 | 1 | 4 |
| 7 | Hans Marte | Austria | 0 | 1 | 3 | 4 |
| 10 | Marin Bolocan | Romania | 3 | 0 | 2 | 5 |
| 10 | Don Cacas | Australia | 2 | 0 | 3 | 5 |
| 10 | Moustafa Hamil Mansour | Egypt | 3 | 1 | 1 | 5 |
| 10 | Rasoul Mir Malek | Iran | 1 | 2 | 2 | 5 |
| 10 | Svend Skrydstrup | Denmark | 2 | 0 | 3 | 5 |
| 15 | Kyösti Lehtonen | Finland | 0 | 2 | 1 | 3* |
| 16 | Erik Olsson | Sweden | 1 | 2 | 3 | 6 |
| 17 | Lothar Schneider | United Team of Germany | 2 | 2 | 3 | 7 |
| 18 | Petros Galaktopoulos | Greece | 1 | 3 | 4 | 8 |
| 18 | Dinko Petrov | Bulgaria | 2 | 2 | 4 | 8 |

=== Round 4 ===
All 7 losers and 2 of the 7 winners were eliminated in this round. Polyák stayed at 1 point, while all 4 other wrestlers remaining had 3 points.

Bouts

| Winner | Nation | Victory Type | Loser | Nation |
|---|---|---|---|---|
| Ronald Finley | United States | Fall | Don Cacas | Australia |
| Rasoul Mir Malek | Iran | Decision | Georges Ballery | Austria |
| Moustafa Hamil Mansour | Egypt | Decision | Marin Bolocan | Romania |
| Branko Martinović | Yugoslavia | Decision | Svend Skrydstrup | Denmark |
| Roman Rurua | Soviet Union | Decision | Jef Mewis | Belgium |
| Imre Polyák | Hungary | Default | Hans Marte | Austria |
| Koji Sakurama | Japan | Decision | Kazimierz Macioch | Poland |

Points

| Rank | Wrestler | Nation | R1 | R2 | R3 | R4 | Total |
|---|---|---|---|---|---|---|---|
| 1 | Imre Polyák | Hungary | 1 | 0 | 0 | 0 | 1 |
| 2 | Ronald Finley | United States | 3 | 0 | 0 | 0 | 3 |
| 2 | Branko Martinović | Yugoslavia | 0 | 2 | 0 | 1 | 3 |
| 2 | Roman Rurua | Soviet Union | 1 | 0 | 1 | 1 | 3 |
| 2 | Koji Sakurama | Japan | 1 | 0 | 1 | 1 | 3 |
| 6 | Moustafa Hamil Mansour | Egypt | 3 | 1 | 1 | 1 | 6 |
| 6 | Jef Mewis | Belgium | 0 | 0 | 3 | 3 | 6 |
| 6 | Rasoul Mir Malek | Iran | 1 | 2 | 2 | 1 | 6 |
| 9 | Georges Ballery | France | 0 | 3 | 1 | 3 | 7 |
| 9 | Kazimierz Macioch | Poland | 3 | 0 | 1 | 3 | 7 |
| 11 | Marin Bolocan | Romania | 3 | 0 | 2 | 3 | 8 |
| 11 | Hans Marte | Austria | 0 | 1 | 3 | 4 | 8 |
| 11 | Svend Skrydstrup | Denmark | 2 | 0 | 3 | 3 | 8 |
| 14 | Don Cacas | Australia | 2 | 0 | 3 | 4 | 9 |

=== Round 5 ===
Polyák had the bye. Both bouts featured two wrestlers with 3 points; winners would continue while losers would be out (ties would leave both men in competition). Martinović and Rurua won their bouts, advancing to the final round along with Polyák.

Bouts

| Winner | Nation | Victory Type | Loser | Nation |
|---|---|---|---|---|
| Branko Martinović | Yugoslavia | Decision | Ronald Finley | United States |
| Roman Rurua | Soviet Union | Decision | Koji Sakurama | Japan |
| Imre Polyák | Hungary | Bye | N/A | N/A |

Points

| Rank | Wrestler | Nation | R1 | R2 | R3 | R4 | R5 | Total |
|---|---|---|---|---|---|---|---|---|
| 1 | Imre Polyák | Hungary | 1 | 0 | 0 | 0 | 0 | 1 |
| 2 | Branko Martinović | Yugoslavia | 0 | 2 | 0 | 1 | 1 | 4 |
| 2 | Roman Rurua | Soviet Union | 1 | 0 | 1 | 1 | 1 | 4 |
| 4 | Ronald Finley | United States | 3 | 0 | 0 | 0 | 3 | 6 |
| 4 | Koji Sakurama | Japan | 1 | 0 | 1 | 1 | 3 | 6 |

=== Final round ===
Martinović did not contest the final rounds, taking the bronze medal. Polyák and Rurua wrestled to a draw, with the gold medal going to the Hungarian based on the total points tie-breaker.

Bouts

| Winner | Nation | Victory Type | Loser | Nation |
|---|---|---|---|---|
| Imre Polyák | Hungary | Tie | Roman Rurua | Soviet Union |

Points

| Rank | Wrestler | Nation | Points | R1 | R2 | R3 | R4 | R5 | FR | Total |
|---|---|---|---|---|---|---|---|---|---|---|
| 1st place, gold medalist(s) | Imre Polyák | Hungary | 2 | 1 | 0 | 0 | 0 | 0 | 2 | 3 |
| 2nd place, silver medalist(s) | Roman Rurua | Soviet Union | 2 | 1 | 0 | 1 | 1 | 1 | 2 | 6 |
| 3rd place, bronze medalist(s) | Branko Martinović | Yugoslavia | Withdrew | | | | | | | |
