= Wrestling at the 1960 Summer Olympics – Men's Greco-Roman featherweight =

Wrestling at the Olympics

Men's Greco-Roman featherweight at the Games of the XVII Olympiad
- Venue: Basilica of Maxentius
- Dates: 26–31 August 1960
- Competitors: 25 from 25 nations

Medalists
1st place, gold medalist(s)		Müzahir Sille	Turkey
2nd place, silver medalist(s)		Imre Polyák	Hungary
3rd place, bronze medalist(s)		Konstantin Vyrupayev	Soviet Union

The men's Greco-Roman featherweight competition at the 1960 Summer Olympics in Rome took place from 26 to 31 August at the Basilica of Maxentius. Nations were limited to one competitor. Featherweight was the third-lightest category, including wrestlers weighing 57 to 62 kilograms (125.7 to 136.7 lb).

== Competition format ==
This Greco-Roman wrestling competition continued to use the "bad points" elimination system introduced at the 1928 Summer Olympics for Greco-Roman and at the 1932 Summer Olympics for freestyle wrestling, though adjusted the point values slightly. Wins by fall continued to be worth 0 points and wins by decision continued to be worth 1 point. Losses by fall, however, were now worth 4 points (up from 3). Losses by decision were worth 3 points (consistent with most prior years, though in some losses by split decision had been worth only 2 points). Ties were now allowed, worth 2 points for each wrestler. The elimination threshold was also increased from 5 points to 6 points. The medal round concept, used in 1952 and 1956 requiring a round-robin amongst the medalists even if one or more finished a round with enough points for elimination, was used only if exactly three wrestlers remained after a round—if two competitors remained, they faced off head-to-head; if only one, he was the gold medalist.

== Results ==
=== Round 1 ===
Bouts

Winner	Nation	Victory Type	Loser	Nation
Lee Allen	United States	Fall	José António Gregório	Portugal
Hossein Ebrahimian	Iran	Decision	Rauno Mäkinen	Finland
Elie Naasan	Lebanon	Decision	Joseph Schmid	Switzerland
Vojtech Tóth	Czechoslovakia	Fall	Jean Schintgen	Luxembourg
Mihai Şulţ	Romania	Fall	Don Cacas	Australia
Moustafa Hamil Mansour	United Arab Republic	Decision	Spas Penev	Bulgaria
Leif Freij	Sweden	Decision	Masatoshi Takahira	Japan
Müzahir Sille	Turkey	Decision	Gottlieb Neumair	United Team of Germany
Rudolf Pedersen	Denmark	Decision	Kazimierz Macioch	Poland
Umberto Trippa	Italy	Decision	Roger Mannhard	France
Hans Marte	Austria	Tie	Konstantin Vyrupayev	Soviet Union
Imre Polyák	Hungary	Fall	Vojislav Gološin	Yugoslavia
Rahal Mahassine	Morocco	Bye	N/A	N/A

Points

Rank	Wrestler	Nation	Start	Earned	Total
1	Lee Allen	United States	0	0	0
1	Imre Polyák	Hungary	0	0	0
1	Rahal Mahassine	Morocco	0	0	0
1	Mihai Şulţ	Romania	0	0	0
1	Vojtech Tóth	Czechoslovakia	0	0	0
6	Hossein Ebrahimian	Iran	0	1	1
6	Leif Freij	Sweden	0	1	1
6	Moustafa Hamil Mansour	United Arab Republic	0	1	1
6	Elie Naasan	Lebanon	0	1	1
6	Rudolf Pedersen	Denmark	0	1	1
6	Müzahir Sille	Turkey	0	1	1
6	Umberto Trippa	Italy	0	1	1
13	Hans Marte	Austria	0	2	2
13	Konstantin Vyrupayev	Soviet Union	0	2	2
15	Kazimierz Macioch	Poland	0	3	3
15	Rauno Mäkinen	Finland	0	3	3
15	Gottlieb Neumair	United Team of Germany	0	3	3
15	Spas Penev	Bulgaria	0	3	3
15	Joseph Schmid	Switzerland	0	3	3
15	Masatoshi Takahira	Japan	0	3	3
15	Roger Mannhard	France	0	3	3
22	Don Cacas	Australia	0	4	4
22	Vojislav Gološin	Yugoslavia	0	4	4
22	José António Gregório	Portugal	0	4	4
22	Jean Schintgen	Luxembourg	0	4	4

=== Round 2 ===
Mäkinen withdrew after his bout.

Bouts

Winner	Nation	Victory Type	Loser	Nation
Hossein Ebrahimian	Iran	Fall	José António Gregório	Portugal
Lee Allen	United States	Decision	Rahal Mahassine	Morocco
Rauno Mäkinen	Finland	Decision	Joseph Schmid	Switzerland
Spas Penev	Bulgaria	Decision	Leif Freij	Sweden
Gottlieb Neumair	United Team of Germany	Fall	Masatoshi Takahira	Japan
Moustafa Hamil Mansour	United Arab Republic	Fall	Don Cacas	Australia
Mihai Şulţ	Romania	Fall	Jean Schintgen	Luxembourg
Elie Naasan	Lebanon	Tie	Vojtech Tóth	Czechoslovakia
Umberto Trippa	Italy	Decision	Hans Marte	Austria
Müzahir Sille	Turkey	Decision	Kazimierz Macioch	Poland
Roger Mannhard	France	Fall	Rudolf Pedersen	Denmark
Konstantin Vyrupayev	Soviet Union	Fall	Vojislav Gološin	Yugoslavia
Imre Polyák	Hungary	Bye	N/A	N/A

Points

Rank	Wrestler	Nation	Start	Earned	Total
1	Imre Polyák	Hungary	0	0	0
1	Mihai Şulţ	Romania	0	0	0
3	Lee Allen	United States	0	1	1
3	Hossein Ebrahimian	Iran	1	0	1
3	Moustafa Hamil Mansour	United Arab Republic	1	0	1
6	Müzahir Sille	Turkey	1	1	2
6	Vojtech Tóth	Czechoslovakia	0	2	2
6	Umberto Trippa	Italy	1	1	2
6	Konstantin Vyrupayev	Soviet Union	2	0	2
10	Rahal Mahassine	Morocco	0	3	3
10	Roger Mannhard	France	3	0	3
10	Elie Naasan	Lebanon	1	2	3
10	Gottlieb Neumair	United Team of Germany	3	0	3
14	Leif Freij	Sweden	1	3	4
14	Spas Penev	Bulgaria	3	1	4
16	Hans Marte	Austria	2	3	5
16	Rudolf Pedersen	Denmark	1	4	5
18	Rauno Mäkinen	Finland	3	1	4*
19	Kazimierz Macioch	Poland	3	3	6
19	Joseph Schmid	Switzerland	3	3	6
21	Masatoshi Takahira	Japan	3	4	7
22	Don Cacas	Australia	4	4	8
22	Vojislav Gološin	Yugoslavia	4	4	8
22	José António Gregório	Portugal	4	4	8
22	Jean Schintgen	Luxembourg	4	4	8

=== Round 3 ===
Bouts

Winner	Nation	Victory Type	Loser	Nation
Hossein Ebrahimian	Iran	Decision	Lee Allen	United States
Imre Polyák	Hungary	Fall	Rahal Mahassine	Morocco
Umberto Trippa	Italy	Fall	Rudolf Pedersen	Denmark
Spas Penev	Bulgaria	Decision	Gottlieb Neumair	United Team of Germany
Müzahir Sille	Turkey	Fall	Leif Freij	Sweden
Mihai Şulţ	Romania	Decision	Elie Naasan	Lebanon
Vojtech Tóth	Czechoslovakia	Decision	Moustafa Hamil Mansour	United Arab Republic
Hans Marte	Austria	Decision	Roger Mannhard	France
Konstantin Vyrupayev	Soviet Union	Bye	N/A	N/A

Points

Rank	Wrestler	Nation	Start	Earned	Total
1	Imre Polyák	Hungary	0	0	0
2	Mihai Şulţ	Romania	0	1	1
3	Hossein Ebrahimian	Iran	1	1	2
3	Müzahir Sille	Turkey	2	0	2
3	Umberto Trippa	Italy	2	0	2
3	Konstantin Vyrupayev	Soviet Union	2	0	2
7	Vojtech Tóth	Czechoslovakia	2	1	3
8	Lee Allen	United States	1	3	4
8	Moustafa Hamil Mansour	United Arab Republic	1	3	4
10	Spas Penev	Bulgaria	4	1	5
11	Roger Mannhard	France	3	3	6
11	Hans Marte	Austria	5	1	6
11	Elie Naasan	Lebanon	3	3	6
11	Gottlieb Neumair	United Team of Germany	3	3	6
15	Rahal Mahassine	Morocco	3	4	7
16	Leif Freij	Sweden	4	4	8
17	Rudolf Pedersen	Denmark	5	4	9

=== Round 4 ===
Mansour had beaten Penev in round 1, breaking the tie for 9th place.

Bouts

Winner	Nation	Victory Type	Loser	Nation
Imre Polyák	Hungary	Decision	Konstantin Vyrupayev	Soviet Union
Vojtech Tóth	Czechoslovakia	Decision	Lee Allen	United States
Hossein Ebrahimian	Iran	Decision	Mihai Şulţ	Romania
Müzahir Sille	Turkey	Fall	Moustafa Hamil Mansour	United Arab Republic
Umberto Trippa	Italy	Decision	Spas Penev	Bulgaria

Points

Rank	Wrestler	Nation	Start	Earned	Total
1	Imre Polyák	Hungary	0	1	1
2	Müzahir Sille	Turkey	2	0	2
3	Hossein Ebrahimian	Iran	2	1	3
3	Umberto Trippa	Italy	2	1	3
5	Mihai Şulţ	Romania	1	3	4
5	Vojtech Tóth	Czechoslovakia	3	1	4
7	Konstantin Vyrupayev	Soviet Union	2	3	5
8	Lee Allen	United States	4	3	7
9	Moustafa Hamil Mansour	United Arab Republic	4	4	8
10	Spas Penev	Bulgaria	5	3	8

=== Round 5 ===
Bouts

Winner	Nation	Victory Type	Loser	Nation
Konstantin Vyrupayev	Soviet Union	Fall	Hossein Ebrahimian	Iran
Imre Polyák	Hungary	Decision	Vojtech Tóth	Czechoslovakia
Mihai Şulţ	Romania	Decision	Müzahir Sille	Turkey
Umberto Trippa	Italy	Bye	N/A	N/A

Points

Rank	Wrestler	Nation	Start	Earned	Total
1	Imre Polyák	Hungary	1	1	2
2	Umberto Trippa	Italy	3	0	3
3	Müzahir Sille	Turkey	2	3	5
3	Mihai Şulţ	Romania	4	1	5
3	Konstantin Vyrupayev	Soviet Union	5	0	5
6	Hossein Ebrahimian	Iran	3	4	7
6	Vojtech Tóth	Czechoslovakia	4	3	7

=== Round 6 ===
Vyrupayev's head-to-head victory over Trippa was the tie-breaker between the two at 6 points for the bronze medal.

Bouts

Winner	Nation	Victory Type	Loser	Nation
Imre Polyák	Hungary	Decision	Mihai Şulţ	Romania
Konstantin Vyrupayev	Soviet Union	Decision	Umberto Trippa	Italy
Müzahir Sille	Turkey	Bye	N/A	N/A

Points

Rank	Wrestler	Nation	Start	Earned	Total
1	Imre Polyák	Hungary	2	1	3
2	Müzahir Sille	Turkey	5	0	5
3rd place, bronze medalist(s)	Konstantin Vyrupayev	Soviet Union	5	1	6
4	Umberto Trippa	Italy	3	3	6
5	Mihai Şulţ	Romania	5	3	8

=== Round 7 ===
Sille defeated Polyák on points, bringing each of the two wrestlers to 6 points. Because of the head-to-head win, Sille took the gold medal.

Bouts

Winner	Nation	Victory Type	Loser	Nation
Müzahir Sille	Turkey	Decision	Imre Polyák	Hungary

Points

Rank	Wrestler	Nation	Start	Earned	Total
1st place, gold medalist(s)	Müzahir Sille	Turkey	5	1	6
2nd place, silver medalist(s)	Imre Polyák	Hungary	3	3	6
