= Wrestling at the 1960 Summer Olympics – Men's freestyle featherweight =

Wrestling at the Olympics

Men's freestyle featherweight at the Games of the XVII Olympiad
- Venue: Basilica of Maxentius
- Dates: 1–6 September 1960
- Competitors: 25 from 25 nations

Medalists
1st place, gold medalist(s)		Mustafa Dağıstanlı	Turkey
2nd place, silver medalist(s)		Stancho Ivanov	Bulgaria
3rd place, bronze medalist(s)		Vladimer Rubashvili	Soviet Union

The men's freestyle featherweight competition at the 1960 Summer Olympics in Rome took place from 1 to 6 September at the Basilica of Maxentius. Nations were limited to one competitor. Featherweight was the third-lightest category, including wrestlers weighing 57 to 62 kilograms (125.7 to 136.7 lb).

== Competition format ==
This freestyle wrestling competition continued to use the "bad points" elimination system introduced at the 1928 Summer Olympics for Greco-Roman and at the 1932 Summer Olympics for freestyle wrestling, though adjusted the point values slightly. Wins by fall continued to be worth 0 points and wins by decision continued to be worth 1 point. Losses by fall, however, were now worth 4 points (up from 3). Losses by decision were worth 3 points (consistent with most prior years, though in some losses by split decision had been worth only 2 points). Ties were now allowed, worth 2 points for each wrestler. The elimination threshold was also increased from 5 points to 6 points. The medal round concept, used in 1952 and 1956 requiring a round-robin amongst the medalists even if one or more finished a round with enough points for elimination, was used only if exactly three wrestlers remained after a round—if two competitors remained, they faced off head-to-head; if only one, he was the gold medalist.

== Results ==
=== Round 1 ===
Parker and Shiam withdrew after their bouts.

Bouts

Winner	Nation	Victory Type	Loser	Nation
Jef Mewis	Belgium	Fall	Sunder Shiam	India
Hans Marte	Austria	Decision	Samuel Parker	Australia
Mustafa Dağıstanlı	Turkey	Decision	Erkki Penttilä	Finland
József Kellermann	Hungary	Fall	Meinrad Ernst	Switzerland
Vladimer Rubashvili	Soviet Union	Fall	Mohamed Khadem Khorasani	Iran
Louis Giani	United States	Fall	Angelo Gelsomini	Italy
Stefanos Ioannidis	Greece	Fall	Gang Jeong-ho	South Korea
Ahmed Sayed Kasim	Iraq	Tie	Roberto Vallejo	Mexico
Muhammad Akhtar	Pakistan	Fall	Mohammad Ibrahim Kederi	Afghanistan
Tamiji Sato	Japan	Decision	Jan Żurawski	Poland
Abe Geldenhuys	South Africa	Fall	Bert Aspen	Great Britain
Stancho Ivanov	Bulgaria	Fall	Christian Luschnig	United Team of Germany
Georges Ballery	France	Bye	N/A	N/A

Points

Rank	Wrestler	Nation	Start	Earned	Total
1	Muhammad Akhtar	Pakistan	0	0	0
1	Georges Ballery	France	0	0	0
1	Abe Geldenhuys	South Africa	0	0	0
1	Louis Giani	United States	0	0	0
1	Stefanos Ioannidis	Greece	0	0	0
1	Stancho Ivanov	Bulgaria	0	0	0
1	József Kellermann	Hungary	0	0	0
1	Jef Mewis	Belgium	0	0	0
1	Vladimer Rubashvili	Soviet Union	0	0	0
10	Mustafa Dağıstanlı	Turkey	0	1	1
10	Hans Marte	Austria	0	1	1
10	Tamiji Sato	Japan	0	1	1
13	Ahmed Sayed Kasim	Iraq	0	2	2
13	Roberto Vallejo	Mexico	0	2	2
15	Erkki Penttilä	Finland	0	3	3
15	Jan Żurawski	Poland	0	3	3
17	Bert Aspen	Great Britain	0	4	4
17	Gang Jeong-ho	South Korea	0	4	4
17	Angelo Gelsomini	Italy	0	4	4
17	Mohammad Ibrahim Kederi	Afghanistan	0	4	4
17	Mohamed Khadem Khorasani	Iran	0	4	4
17	Christian Luschnig	United Team of Germany	0	4	4
17	Meinrad Ernst	Switzerland	0	4	4
24	Samuel Parker	Australia	0	3	3*
25	Sunder Shiam	India	0	4	4*

=== Round 2 ===
Ioannidis withdrew after his bout.

Bouts

Winner	Nation	Victory Type	Loser	Nation
Jef Mewis	Belgium	Decision	Georges Ballery	France
Mustafa Dağıstanlı	Turkey	Fall	Hans Marte	Austria
Erkki Penttilä	Finland	Decision	József Kellermann	Hungary
Vladimer Rubashvili	Soviet Union	Fall	Meinrad Ernst	Switzerland
Mohamed Khadem Khorasani	Iran	Fall	Louis Giani	United States
Gang Jeong-ho	South Korea	Decision	Angelo Gelsomini	Italy
Ahmed Sayed Kasim	Iraq	Decision	Stefanos Ioannidis	Greece
Roberto Vallejo	Mexico	Decision	Mohammad Ibrahim Kederi	Afghanistan
Tamiji Sato	Japan	Decision	Muhammad Akhtar	Pakistan
Jan Żurawski	Poland	Decision	Abe Geldenhuys	South Africa
Bert Aspen	Great Britain	Tie	Christian Luschnig	United Team of Germany
Stancho Ivanov	Bulgaria	Bye	N/A	N/A

Points

Rank	Wrestler	Nation	Start	Earned	Total
1	Stancho Ivanov	Bulgaria	0	0	0
1	Vladimer Rubashvili	Soviet Union	0	0	0
3	Mustafa Dağıstanlı	Turkey	1	0	1
3	Jef Mewis	Belgium	0	1	1
5	Tamiji Sato	Japan	1	1	2
6	Muhammad Akhtar	Pakistan	0	3	3
6	Georges Ballery	France	0	3	3
6	Abe Geldenhuys	South Africa	0	3	3
6	József Kellermann	Hungary	0	3	3
6	Ahmed Sayed Kasim	Iraq	2	1	3
6	Roberto Vallejo	Mexico	2	1	3
12	Louis Giani	United States	0	4	4
12	Mohamed Khadem Khorasani	Iran	4	0	4
12	Erkki Penttilä	Finland	3	1	4
12	Jan Żurawski	Poland	3	1	4
16	Gang Jeong-ho	South Korea	4	1	5
16	Hans Marte	Austria	1	4	5
18	Stefanos Ioannidis	Greece	0	3	3*
19	Bert Aspen	Great Britain	4	2	6
19	Christian Luschnig	United Team of Germany	4	2	6
21	Angelo Gelsomini	Italy	4	3	7
21	Mohammad Ibrahim Kederi	Afghanistan	4	3	7
23	Meinrad Ernst	Switzerland	4	4	8

=== Round 3 ===
Giani withdrew after his bout.

Bouts

Winner	Nation	Victory Type	Loser	Nation
Stancho Ivanov	Bulgaria	Decision	Georges Ballery	France
Jef Mewis	Belgium	Fall	Hans Marte	Austria
Mustafa Dağıstanlı	Turkey	Fall	József Kellermann	Hungary
Vladimer Rubashvili	Soviet Union	Fall	Erkki Penttilä	Finland
Mohamed Khadem Khorasani	Iran	Fall	Gang Jeong-ho	South Korea
Louis Giani	United States	Decision	Ahmed Sayed Kasim	Iraq
Tamiji Sato	Japan	Fall	Roberto Vallejo	Mexico
Muhammad Akhtar	Pakistan	Decision	Jan Żurawski	Poland
Abe Geldenhuys	South Africa	Bye	N/A	N/A

Points

Rank	Wrestler	Nation	Start	Earned	Total
1	Vladimer Rubashvili	Soviet Union	0	0	0
2	Mustafa Dağıstanlı	Turkey	1	0	1
2	Stancho Ivanov	Bulgaria	0	1	1
2	Jef Mewis	Belgium	1	0	1
5	Tamiji Sato	Japan	2	0	2
6	Abe Geldenhuys	South Africa	3	0	3
7	Muhammad Akhtar	Pakistan	3	1	4
7	Mohamed Khadem Khorasani	Iran	4	0	4
9	Louis Giani	United States	4	1	5*
10	Georges Ballery	France	3	3	6
10	Ahmed Sayed Kasim	Iraq	3	3	6
12	József Kellermann	Hungary	3	4	7
12	Roberto Vallejo	Mexico	3	4	7
12	Jan Żurawski	Poland	4	3	7
15	Erkki Penttilä	Finland	4	4	8
16	Gang Jeong-ho	South Korea	5	4	9
16	Hans Marte	Austria	5	4	9

=== Round 4 ===
Bouts

Winner	Nation	Victory Type	Loser	Nation
Stancho Ivanov	Bulgaria	Decision	Abe Geldenhuys	South Africa
Mustafa Dağıstanlı	Turkey	Decision	Jef Mewis	Belgium
Muhammad Akhtar	Pakistan	Decision	Vladimer Rubashvili	Soviet Union
Tamiji Sato	Japan	Fall	Mohamed Khadem Khorasani	Iran

Points

Rank	Wrestler	Nation	Start	Earned	Total
1	Mustafa Dağıstanlı	Turkey	1	1	2
1	Stancho Ivanov	Bulgaria	1	1	2
1	Tamiji Sato	Japan	2	0	2
4	Vladimer Rubashvili	Soviet Union	0	3	3
5	Jef Mewis	Belgium	1	3	4
6	Muhammad Akhtar	Pakistan	4	1	5
7	Abe Geldenhuys	South Africa	3	3	6
8	Mohamed Khadem Khorasani	Iran	4	4	8

=== Round 5 ===
Bouts

Winner	Nation	Victory Type	Loser	Nation
Stancho Ivanov	Bulgaria	Fall	Jef Mewis	Belgium
Mustafa Dağıstanlı	Turkey	Fall	Muhammad Akhtar	Pakistan
Vladimer Rubashvili	Soviet Union	Decision	Tamiji Sato	Japan

Points

Rank	Wrestler	Nation	Start	Earned	Total
1	Mustafa Dağıstanlı	Turkey	2	0	2
1	Stancho Ivanov	Bulgaria	2	0	2
3	Vladimer Rubashvili	Soviet Union	3	1	4
4	Tamiji Sato	Japan	2	3	5
5	Jef Mewis	Belgium	4	4	8
6	Muhammad Akhtar	Pakistan	5	4	9

=== Round 6 ===
Rubashvili's head-to-head victory over Sato in round 5 was the tie-breaker for the bronze medal.

Bouts

Winner	Nation	Victory Type	Loser	Nation
Stancho Ivanov	Bulgaria	Decision	Vladimer Rubashvili	Soviet Union
Mustafa Dağıstanlı	Turkey	Tie	Tamiji Sato	Japan

Points

Rank	Wrestler	Nation	Start	Earned	Total
1	Stancho Ivanov	Bulgaria	2	1	3
2	Mustafa Dağıstanlı	Turkey	2	2	4
3rd place, bronze medalist(s)	Vladimer Rubashvili	Soviet Union	4	3	7
4	Tamiji Sato	Japan	5	2	7

=== Round 7 ===
Bouts

Winner	Nation	Victory Type	Loser	Nation
Mustafa Dağıstanlı	Turkey	Decision	Stancho Ivanov	Bulgaria

Points

Rank	Wrestler	Nation	Start	Earned	Total
1st place, gold medalist(s)	Mustafa Dağıstanlı	Turkey	4	1	5
2nd place, silver medalist(s)	Stancho Ivanov	Bulgaria	3	3	6
