= Wrestling at the 1964 Summer Olympics – Men's freestyle featherweight =

Wrestling at the Olympics

Men's freestyle featherweight at the Games of the XVIII Olympiad
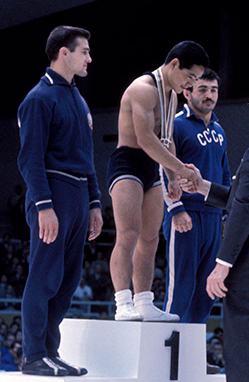
- Medal winners
- Venue: Komazawa Gymnasium
- Dates: 11–14 October 1964
- Competitors: 21 from 21 nations

Medalists
1st place, gold medalist(s)		Osamu Watanabe	Japan
2nd place, silver medalist(s)		Stancho Ivanov	Bulgaria
3rd place, bronze medalist(s)		Nodar Khokhashvili	Soviet Union

The men's freestyle featherweight competition at the 1964 Summer Olympics in Tokyo took place from 11 to 14 October at the Komazawa Gymnasium. Nations were limited to one competitor. Featherweight was the third-lightest category, including wrestlers weighing 57 to 63 kilograms (125.7 to 138.9 lb).

== Competition format ==
This freestyle wrestling competition continued to use the "bad points" elimination system introduced at the 1928 Summer Olympics for Greco-Roman and at the 1932 Summer Olympics for freestyle wrestling, as adjusted at the 1960 Summer Olympics. Each bout awarded 4 points. If the victory was by fall, the winner received 0 and the loser 4. If the victory was by decision, the winner received 1 and the loser 3. If the bout was tied, each wrestler received 2 points. A wrestler who accumulated 6 or more points was eliminated. Rounds continued until there were 3 or fewer uneliminated wrestlers. If only 1 wrestler remained, he received the gold medal. If 2 wrestlers remained, point totals were ignored and they faced each other for gold and silver (if they had already wrestled each other, that result was used). If 3 wrestlers remained, point totals were ignored and a round-robin was held among those 3 to determine medals (with previous head-to-head results, if any, counting for this round-robin).

== Results ==
=== Round 1 ===
Bouts

Winner	Nation	Victory Type	Loser	Nation
Osamu Watanabe	Japan	Fall	Baldangiin Sanjaa	Mongolia
Raúl Romero	Argentina	Decision	John Smith	Zambia
Reiner Schilling	United Team of Germany	Decision	Antonio Senosa	Philippines
Yun Daek	South Korea	Decision	Ray Brown	Australia
Mario Tovar	Mexico	Fall	Roy Meehan	New Zealand
Matti Jutila	Canada	Fall	Ibrahim Seifpour	Iran
Tauno Jaskari	Finland	Tie	Bandu Patil	India
Bobby Douglas	United States	Decision	Hayrullah Şahinkaya	Turkey
Nodar Khokhashvili	Soviet Union	Decision	Muhammad Akhtar	Pakistan
Stancho Ivanov	Bulgaria	Fall	Bert Aspen	Great Britain
Mohammad Ebrahim Khedri	Afghanistan	Bye	N/A	N/A

Points

Rank	Wrestler	Nation	R1
1	Mohammad Ebrahim Khedri	Afghanistan	0
1	Stancho Ivanov	Bulgaria	0
1	Matti Jutila	Canada	0
1	Mario Tovar	Mexico	0
1	Osamu Watanabe	Japan	0
6	Bobby Douglas	United States	1
6	Nodar Khokhashvili	Soviet Union	1
6	Raúl Romero	Argentina	1
6	Reiner Schilling	United Team of Germany	1
6	Yun Daek	South Korea	1
11	Tauno Jaskari	Finland	2
11	Bandu Patil	India	2
13	Muhammad Akhtar	Pakistan	3
13	Ray Brown	Australia	3
13	Hayrullah Şahinkaya	Turkey	3
13	Antonio Senosa	Philippines	3
13	John Smith	Zambia	3
18	Bert Aspen	Great Britain	4
18	Baldangiin Sanjaa	Mongolia	4
18	Roy Meehan	New Zealand	4
18	Ibrahim Seifpour	Iran	4

=== Round 2 ===
Six wrestlers were eliminated after two losses; a seventh man was also eliminated after a tie and a loss by fall. Baldangiin Sanjaa withdrew after the round. Thirteen wrestlers advanced to round 3, led by Ebrahim and Watanabe at 0 points.

Bouts

Winner	Nation	Victory Type	Loser	Nation
Mohammad Ebrahim Khedri	Afghanistan	Fall	Raúl Romero	Argentina
Osamu Watanabe	Japan	Fall	John Smith	Zambia
Baldangiin Sanjaa	Mongolia	Fall	Antonio Senosa	Philippines
Reiner Schilling	United Team of Germany	Decision	Yun Daek	South Korea
Mario Tovar	Mexico	Decision	Ray Brown	Australia
Ibrahim Seifpour	Iran	Fall	Roy Meehan	New Zealand
Tauno Jaskari	Finland	Decision	Matti Jutila	Canada
Bobby Douglas	United States	Fall	Bandu Patil	India
Nodar Khokhashvili	Soviet Union	Decision	Hayrullah Şahinkaya	Turkey
Stancho Ivanov	Bulgaria	Decision	Muhammad Akhtar	Pakistan
Bert Aspen	Great Britain	Bye	N/A	N/A

Points

Rank	Wrestler	Nation	R1	R2	Total
1	Mohammad Ebrahim Khedri	Afghanistan	0	0	0
1	Osamu Watanabe	Japan	0	0	0
3	Bobby Douglas	United States	1	0	1
3	Stancho Ivanov	Bulgaria	0	1	1
3	Mario Tovar	Mexico	0	1	1
6	Nodar Khokhashvili	Soviet Union	1	1	2
6	Reiner Schilling	United Team of Germany	1	1	2
8	Tauno Jaskari	Finland	2	1	3
8	Matti Jutila	Canada	0	3	3
10	Bert Aspen	Great Britain	4	0	4
10	Ibrahim Seifpour	Iran	4	0	4
10	Yun Daek	South Korea	1	3	4
13	Raúl Romero	Argentina	1	4	5
14	Baldangiin Sanjaa	Mongolia	4	0	4*
15	Muhammad Akhtar	Pakistan	3	3	6
15	Ray Brown	Australia	3	3	6
15	Hayrullah Şahinkaya	Turkey	3	3	6
15	Bandu Patil	India	2	4	6
19	Antonio Senosa	Philippines	3	4	7
19	John Smith	Zambia	3	4	7
21	Roy Meehan	New Zealand	4	4	8

=== Round 3 ===
Five of the six bout losers in this round were eliminated; Tover, who had started with 1 point and thus could not be eliminated, moved to 4 points but stayed in competition. Eight men remained. Watanabe was the only wrestler to continue to have 0 points after his third win by fall.

Bouts

Winner	Nation	Victory Type	Loser	Nation
Mohammad Ebrahim Khedri	Afghanistan	Decision	Bert Aspen	Great Britain
Osamu Watanabe	Japan	Fall	Raúl Romero	Argentina
Reiner Schilling	United Team of Germany	Decision	Mario Tovar	Mexico
Ibrahim Seifpour	Iran	Fall	Yun Daek	South Korea
Bobby Douglas	United States	Decision	Matti Jutila	Canada
Nodar Khokhashvili	Soviet Union	Decision	Tauno Jaskari	Finland
Stancho Ivanov	Bulgaria	Bye	N/A	N/A

Points

Rank	Wrestler	Nation	R1	R2	R3	Total
1	Osamu Watanabe	Japan	0	0	0	0
2	Mohammad Ebrahim Khedri	Afghanistan	0	0	1	1
2	Stancho Ivanov	Bulgaria	0	1	0	1
4	Bobby Douglas	United States	1	0	1	2
5	Nodar Khokhashvili	Soviet Union	1	1	1	3
5	Reiner Schilling	United Team of Germany	1	1	1	3
7	Ibrahim Seifpour	Iran	4	0	0	4
7	Mario Tovar	Mexico	0	1	3	4
9	Tauno Jaskari	Finland	2	1	3	6
9	Matti Jutila	Canada	0	3	3	6
11	Bert Aspen	Great Britain	4	0	3	7
12	Yun Daek	South Korea	1	3	4	8
13	Raúl Romero	Argentina	1	4	4	9

=== Round 4 ===
All four bouts were determined by decision, resulting in wrestlers receiving at least 1 point. Watanabe, at 1 point, remained in the lead. Schilling's first loss was enough to eliminate him; Tovar had two losses and was also eliminated. Ebrahim and Douglas were each able to survive their first loss, at 4 and 5 points total respectively.

Bouts

Winner	Nation	Victory Type	Loser	Nation
Stancho Ivanov	Bulgaria	Decision	Mohammad Ebrahim Khedri	Afghanistan
Osamu Watanabe	Japan	Decision	Reiner Schilling	United Team of Germany
Ibrahim Seifpour	Iran	Decision	Mario Tovar	Mexico
Nodar Khokhashvili	Soviet Union	Decision	Bobby Douglas	United States

Points

Rank	Wrestler	Nation	R1	R2	R3	R4	Total
1	Osamu Watanabe	Japan	0	0	0	1	1
2	Stancho Ivanov	Bulgaria	0	1	0	1	2
3	Mohammad Ebrahim Khedri	Afghanistan	0	0	1	3	4
3	Nodar Khokhashvili	Soviet Union	1	1	1	1	4
5	Bobby Douglas	United States	1	0	1	3	5
5	Ibrahim Seifpour	Iran	4	0	0	1	5
7	Reiner Schilling	United Team of Germany	1	1	1	3	6
8	Mario Tovar	Mexico	0	1	3	3	7

=== Round 5 ===
Watanabe received his second point in a win by decision over Ivanov; the latter man moved from 2 points to 5 points and so remained in contention. The bout between Douglas and Ebrahim resulted in both wrestlers being eliminated; Douglas needed to win by fall to remain uneliminated but instead won by decision. Khokhashvili won his fifth straight decision, staying in the competition at 5 points.

Bouts

Winner	Nation	Victory Type	Loser	Nation
Osamu Watanabe	Japan	Decision	Stancho Ivanov	Bulgaria
Bobby Douglas	United States	Decision	Mohammad Ebrahim Khedri	Afghanistan
Nodar Khokhashvili	Soviet Union	Decision	Ibrahim Seifpour	Iran

Points

Rank	Wrestler	Nation	R1	R2	R3	R4	R5	Total
1	Osamu Watanabe	Japan	0	0	0	1	1	2
2	Stancho Ivanov	Bulgaria	0	1	0	1	3	5
2	Nodar Khokhashvili	Soviet Union	1	1	1	1	1	5
4	Bobby Douglas	United States	1	0	1	3	1	6
5	Mohammad Ebrahim Khedri	Afghanistan	0	0	1	3	3	7
6	Ibrahim Seifpour	Iran	4	0	0	1	3	8

=== Final round ===
With three remaining wrestlers, the final round was a round-robin among the medalists. Watanabe's round 5 victory over Ivanov counted. Ivanov and Khokhasvili wrestled to a draw; this would ultimately be the de facto silver/bronze match as Watanabe then defeated Khokhashvili by decision to take the gold medal. Ivanov and Khokhasvili each had 5 points in the round-robin (the tie against each other as well as a loss by decision to Watanabe), and head-to-head results (the tie) were unable to break the standings tie. The next tie-breaker was body weight; Ivanov took silver as the lighter wrestler.

Bouts

Winner	Nation	Victory Type	Loser	Nation
Osamu Watanabe	Japan	Decision (Round 5)	Stancho Ivanov	Bulgaria
Stancho Ivanov	Bulgaria	Tie	Nodar Khokhashvili	Soviet Union
Osamu Watanabe	Japan	Decision	Nodar Khokhashvili	Soviet Union

Points

Rank	Wrestler	Nation	Points
1st place, gold medalist(s)	Osamu Watanabe	Japan	2
2nd place, silver medalist(s)	Stancho Ivanov	Bulgaria	5
3rd place, bronze medalist(s)	Nodar Khokhashvili	Soviet Union	5
