= Nodar Khokhashvili =

Georgian wrestler (born 1940)

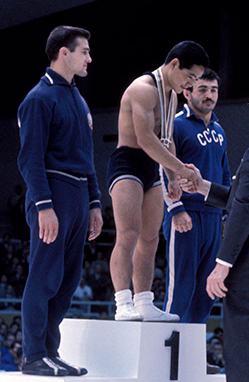
- Nodar Khokhashvili (right) at the 1964 Olympics

Personal information
- Born: ნოდარ ხოხაშვილი Нодар Георгиевич Хохашвили; 28 September 1940 (age 85) Tbilisi, Georgian SSR, Soviet Union
- Height: 1.68 m (5 ft 6 in)

Sport
- Sport: Freestyle wrestling
- Club: Kolmeurne Tbilisi
Medal record
Men's freestyle wrestling
Representing the Soviet Union
Olympic Games
| Bronze medal – third place | 1964 Tokyo | 63 kg |
World Championships
| Bronze medal – third place | 1969 Mar del Plata | 68 kg |
European Championships
| Silver medal – second place | 1969 Modena | 68 kg |
Tbilisi International Tournament
| Gold medal – first place | 1970 Tbilisi | 70 kg |
| Gold medal – first place | 1969 Tbilisi | 70 kg |
| Gold medal – first place | 1966 Tbilisi | 70 kg |
| Gold medal – first place | 1964 Tbilisi | 70 kg |

Nodar Georgiyevich Khokhashvili (born 28 September 1940) is a retired Georgian freestyle wrestler who won a bronze medal in the featherweight division at the 1964 Olympics. Nodar won the first 5 rounds, including the match against the 1960 Olympic medalist and World champion Ebrahim Seifpour, but lost to Osamu Watanabe, then his silver medal match against Stancho Kolev ended in a draw, and the preference was given to Kolev because of his lower body weight.

After the Olympics, Khokhashvili moved to the lightweight category and won medals at the 1969 European Championships and 1969 World Championships. Domestically, he won one Soviet lightweight title in 1969, and Tbilisi International Tournament in 1964, 1966, 1969, 1970.
