= Andrzej Konopka =

Andrzej Konopka may refer to:

- Andrzej Konopka (actor) (born 1969), Polish actor
- Andrzej Konopka (gymnast) (1934–1999), Polish gymnast
