= Kim Bong-jo =

Kim Bong-jo may refer to:

- Kim Bong-jo (swimmer)
- Kim Bong-jo (wrestler)
