= Tracz =

Tracz is a surname which means "sawyer" in Polish. Notable people with the surname include:

- Ala Tracz (born 2010), Polish singer
- Chris Tracz, American college baseball coach
- Jerzy Tracz (born 1943), Polish swimmer
- Józef Tracz (born 1964), Polish wrestler
- Małgorzata Tracz (born 1985), Polish politician
- Mieczysław Tracz (1962–2019), Polish wrestler
- Szymon Tracz (born 1998), Polish road cyclist
