= Neumair =

Neumair is a surname. Notable people with this surname include:

- Peter Neumair (b. 1950), German wrestler who competed in the 1972 and in the 1976 Summer Olympics
- Gottlieb Neumair (b. 1939), German wrestler who competed at the 1960 Summer Olympics
