= Spas Penev =

Bulgarian wrestler

Personal information
- Nationality: Bulgarian
- Born: 10 June 1933 (age 93) Pernik, Bulgaria

Sport
- Sport: Wrestling

Spas Penev (born 10 June 1933) is a Bulgarian wrestler. He competed in the men's Greco-Roman featherweight at the 1960 Summer Olympics.
