= Branislav Martinović =

Serbian wrestler (1937–2015)

Medal record

Men's Greco-Roman wrestling

Representing Yugoslavia

Olympic Games
Silver medal – second place	1960 Rome	Lightweight
Bronze medal – third place	1964 Tokyo	Featherweight

World Championships
Bronze medal – third place	1961 Yokohama	Lightweight

European Championships
Bronze medal – third place	1966 Essen	70 kg

Mediterranean Games
Gold medal – first place	1963 Naples	70 kg

Branislav "Branko" Martinović (Бранислав "Бранко" Мартиновић, 29 November 1937 – 26 February 2015) was a Serbian wrestler who competed in the 1960 Summer Olympics and in the 1964 Summer Olympics. He was born in Belgrade.
