= Meinrad Ernst =

Swiss wrestler (1925–2019)

Personal information
- Nationality: Swiss
- Born: 14 May 1925 Kloten, Switzerland
- Died: 30 October 2019 (aged 94)

Sport
- Sport: Wrestling

Meinrad Ernst (14 May 1925 – 30 October 2019) was a Swiss wrestler. He competed in the men's freestyle featherweight at the 1960 Summer Olympics.
