= Vladimir Rubashvili =

Soviet wrestler

Medal record

Representing the Soviet Union

Men's freestyle wrestling

Olympic Games
Bronze medal – third place	1960 Rome	Featherweight

World Championships
Gold medal – first place	1961 Yokohama	62 kg

Vladimir Rubashvili (Georgian: ვლადიმერ რუბაშვილი ; 1940 – 1964) was a wrestler from Georgia. He was Olympic bronze medalist in Freestyle wrestling in 1960, competing for the Soviet Union.
