= Roger Mannhard =

French wrestler

Personal information
- Nationality: French
- Born: 5 January 1932 (age 94) Sélestat, France

Sport
- Sport: Wrestling

Roger Mannhard (born 5 January 1932) is a French former wrestler. He competed in the men's Greco-Roman featherweight at the 1960 Summer Olympics.
