= Sunder Shiam =

Indian wrestler 1930–2020

Sundar Shyam
Personal information
- Nationality: Indian
- Born: 5 July 1930 Amritsar, India
- Died: 26 March 2020 (aged 89)

Sport
- Sport: Wrestling

Sundar Shyam (5 July 1930 – 26 March 2020) was an Indian wrestler. He competed in the men's freestyle featherweight at the 1960 Summer Olympics.
