= Vojtech Tóth =

Slovak wrestler

Personal information
- Nationality: Slovak
- Born: 16 November 1938 (age 87) Baka, Hungary

Sport
- Sport: Wrestling

Vojtech Tóth (born 16 November 1938) is a Slovak wrestler. He competed in the men's Greco-Roman featherweight at the 1960 Summer Olympics.
