= Baldangiin Sanjaa =

Mongolian wrestler

Personal information
- Nationality: Mongolian
- Born: 9 April 1937 (age 89)

Sport
- Sport: Wrestling

Baldangiin Sanjaa (born 9 April 1937) is a Mongolian wrestler. He competed in the men's freestyle featherweight at the 1964 Summer Olympics.
