= Svend Skrydstrup =

Danish wrestler (1940–2010)

Personal information
- Nationality: Danish
- Born: 21 January 1940 Sønderborg, Denmark
- Died: 1 July 2010 (aged 70)

Sport
- Sport: Wrestling

Svend Skrydstrup (21 January 1940 – 1 July 2010) was a Danish wrestler. He competed in the men's Greco-Roman featherweight at the 1964 Summer Olympics.
