= Ronald Finley =

American wrestler

Personal information
- Born: December 10, 1940 Huntington Park, California, U.S.
- Died: July 5, 2016 (aged 75) Coburg, Oregon, U.S.

Sport
- Country: United States
- Sport: Wrestling
- Events: Greco-Roman, Freestyle and Folkstyle
- College team: Oregon State
- Club: U.S. Army and Olympic Club – San Francisco
- Team: USA
Medal record
Men's freestyle wrestling
Representing the United States
Pan American Games
Gold medal – first place	1963 São Paulo	63 kg
Collegiate Wrestling
Representing the Oregon State Beavers
NCAA Championships
Silver medal – second place	1961 Corvallis	137 lb

Ronald "Ron" Finley (December 10, 1940 – July 5, 2016) was an American wrestler. He competed in the men's Greco-Roman featherweight division at the 1964 Summer Olympics. In college, he wrestled for Oregon State and was an NCAA runner-up in 1961. Finley also served as head coach of the University of Oregon wrestling program from 1971 to 1998. He was the U.S. Greco-Roman wrestling head coach at the 1984 Summer Olympics, which featured four medalists, including gold medalists Jeff Blatnick and Steve Fraser.
