= Louis Giani =

American wrestler (1934–2021)

Personal information
- Born: August 18, 1934 New York, New York, U.S.
- Died: January 19, 2021 (aged 86) Huntington, New York, U.S.

Sport
- Country: United States
- Sport: Wrestling
- Event: Freestyle
- College team: C.W. Post
- Club: New York Athletic Club
- Team: USA
Medal record
Men's freestyle wrestling
Representing the United States
Pan American Games
Gold medal – first place	1959 Chicago	63 kg

Louis Giani (August 18, 1934 – January 19, 2021) was an American wrestler. He competed in the men's freestyle featherweight at the 1960 Summer Olympics. For 38 years, he was the head wrestling coach at Huntington High School in Huntington, New York, compiling a career record of 416–32. In 2003, he was inducted into the National Wrestling Hall of Fame as a Distinguished Member.
