= Angelo Gelsomini =

Italian wrestler (1932–2021)

Personal information
- Nationality: Italian
- Born: 27 January 1932 Narni, Italy
- Died: 8 April 2021 (aged 89)

Sport
- Sport: Wrestling

Angelo Gelsomini (27 January 1932 – 8 April 2021) was an Italian wrestler. He competed in the men's freestyle featherweight at the 1960 Summer Olympics. He died in April 2021, at the age of 89.
