= Mihai Șulț =

Romanian wrestler

Personal information
- Nationality: Romanian
- Born: 7 March 1933 (age 93) Timișoara, Romania

Sport
- Sport: Wrestling

Mihai Șulț (born 7 March 1933) is a Romanian wrestler. He competed in the men's Greco-Roman featherweight at the 1960 Summer Olympics.
