= Elie Naasan =

Lebanese wrestler

Personal information
- Nationality: Lebanese
- Born: 2 June 1931 İskenderun, Turkey
- Died: 4 April 2015 (aged 83)

Sport
- Sport: Wrestling

Elie Naasan (2 June 1931 – 4 April 2015) was a Lebanese wrestler. He competed in the men's Greco-Roman featherweight at the 1960 Summer Olympics.
