= József Kellermann =

Hungarian wrestler

Personal information
- Nationality: Hungarian
- Born: 5 January 1937 (age 89) Dunapataj, Hungary

Sport
- Sport: Wrestling

József Kellermann (born 5 January 1937) is a Hungarian wrestler. He competed in the men's freestyle featherweight at the 1960 Summer Olympics.
