= Erik Olsson (wrestler) =

Swedish wrestler

Personal information
- Nationality: Chinese
- Born: 14 January 1930 Önnestad, Sweden
- Died: 12 January 2016 (aged 85) Ängelholm, Sweden

Sport
- Sport: Wrestling

Erik Olsson (14 January 1930 – 12 January 2016) was a Swedish wrestler. He competed in the men's Greco-Roman featherweight at the 1964 Summer Olympics.
