= Roberto Vallejo =

Mexican wrestler (born 1935)

Personal information
- Born: 1 June 1935 (age 91) Salvatierra, Mexico

Sport
- Sport: Wrestling

Roberto Vallejo (born 1 June 1935) is a Mexican wrestler. He competed in the men's freestyle featherweight at the 1960 Summer Olympics.
