= Masatoshi Takahira =

Japanese wrestler

Personal information
- Nationality: Japanese
- Born: 26 July 1937 (age 89) Nagasaki, Japan

Sport
- Sport: Wrestling

Masatoshi Takahira (born 26 July 1937) is a Japanese wrestler. He competed in the men's Greco-Roman featherweight at the 1960 Summer Olympics.
