= Kasim Ahmed Sayed =

Iraqi sport wrestler

Personal information
- Nationality: Iraqi
- Born: 30 November 1939 (age 86) Baghdad, Iraq

Sport
- Sport: Wrestling

Kasim Ahmed Sayed (born 30 November 1939) is an Iraqi wrestler. He competed in the men's freestyle featherweight at the 1960 Summer Olympics.
