= Roman Rurua =

Georgian wrestler (born 1942)

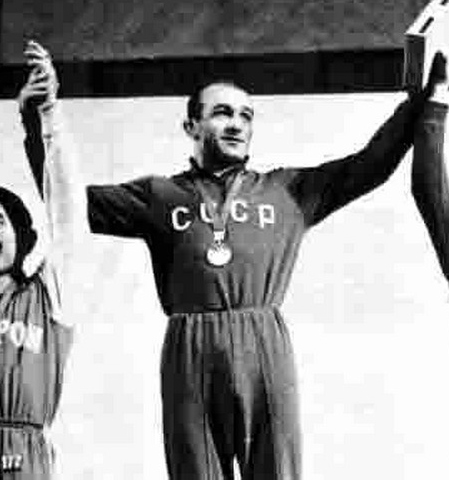
- Rurua at the 1968 Olympics

Personal information
- Born: November 25, 1942 (age 83) Mukhurcha, Martvili Municipality, Samegrelo-Zemo Svaneti, Georgian SSR, Soviet Union
- Height: 165 cm (5 ft 5 in)

Sport
- Sport: Greco-Roman wrestling
- Club: Kolmeurne Tbilisi
Medal record
Representing the Soviet Union
Olympic Games
Gold medal – first place	1968 Mexico City	63 kg
Silver medal – second place	1964 Tokyo	63 kg
World Championships
Gold medal – first place	1966 Toledo	63 kg
Gold medal – first place	1967 Bucharest	63 kg
Gold medal – first place	1969 Mar del Plata	62 kg
Gold medal – first place	1970 Edmonton	68 kg

Roman Vladimirovich Rurua (Georgian: რომან რურუა, born 25 November 1942) is a retired featherweight Greco-Roman wrestler from Georgia. He competed for the Soviet Union at the 1964 and 1968 Summer Olympics and won a silver and a gold medal, respectively. Between 1966 ad 1970 he was undefeated internationally and won four consecutive world titles. At the 1971 World Championships he injured his back and placed sixth. Domestically, he won Soviet titles in different weight divisions in 1963–1965, 1967, 1970 and 1971. In 1972 he retired from competitions, graduated from Georgian Polytechnic Institute, and started to work as an engineer. In 1988 he co-founded the political organization Sporting Georgia, and in 1999–2003 was a member of Parliament of Georgia. Rurua also served as vice-president of the Georgian Wrestling Federation and was inducted into the FILA International Wrestling Hall of Fame in 2010.
