= Christian Luschnig =

German wrestler

Personal information
- Nationality: German
- Born: 25 December 1938 (age 87) Jena, Germany

Sport
- Sport: Wrestling

Christian Luschnig (born 25 December 1938) is a German wrestler. He competed in the men's freestyle featherweight at the 1960 Summer Olympics.
