= Rasoul Mirmalek =

Iranian wrestler (1938–2024)

Personal information
- Nationality: Iranian
- Born: 31 October 1938
- Died: 20 November 2024 (aged 86)

Sport
- Sport: Wrestling

Rasoul Mirmalek (Persian: رسول میرمالک, 31 October 1938 – 20 November 2024) was an Iranian wrestler. He competed in the men's Greco-Roman featherweight at the 1964 Summer Olympics.

Mirmalek died on 20 November 2024, at the age of 86.
