= José António Gregório =

Portuguese wrestler (1939–2026)

Personal information
- Nationality: Portuguese
- Born: 12 August 1939 Lisbon, Portugal
- Died: May 2026 (aged 86)

Sport
- Sport: Wrestling

José António Gregório (12 August 1939 – May 2026) was a Portuguese wrestler. He competed in the men's Greco-Roman featherweight at the 1960 Summer Olympics.
