= Yun Daek =

South Korean wrestler

Personal information
- Nationality: South Korean
- Born: 22 September 1940 (age 85)

Sport
- Sport: Wrestling

Yun Daek (윤대기, born 22 September 1940) is a South Korean wrestler. He competed in the men's freestyle featherweight at the 1964 Summer Olympics.
