= Reiner Schilling =

German wrestler

Personal information
- Nationality: German
- Born: 10 May 1943 Tuttlingen, Germany
- Died: 15 October 2013 (aged 70) Tuttlingen, Germany

Sport
- Sport: Wrestling

Reiner Schilling (10 May 1943 – 15 October 2013) was a German wrestler. He competed in the men's freestyle featherweight at the 1964 Summer Olympics.
