= Vojislav Gološin =

Serbian wrestler

Personal information
- National team: Yugoslavia
- Born: 27 February 1930 Melenci, Yugoslavia
- Height: 171 cm (5 ft 7 in)

Sport
- Sport: Wrestling

Vojislav Gološin (born 27 February 1930) is a Serbian wrestler. He competed in the men's Greco-Roman featherweight at the 1960 Summer Olympics.
