= Kang Chung-ho =

South Korean wrestler

Personal information
- Nationality: South Korean
- Born: 16 December 1938 (age 87) Seoul, South Korea

Sport
- Sport: Wrestling

Kang Chung-ho (born 16 December 1938) is a South Korean wrestler. He competed in the men's freestyle featherweight at the 1960 Summer Olympics.
