= Marin Bolocan =

Romanian wrestler

- Marin Bolocan in 1967

Personal information
- Nationality: Romanian
- Born: 9 August 1937 (age 89)

Sport
- Sport: Wrestling

Marin Bolocan (9 August 1937 - 6 January 2015) was a Romanian wrestler. He competed in the men's Greco-Roman featherweight at the 1964 Summer Olympics.
