= Samuel Parker (wrestler) =

Australian wrestler (1931–2023)

Personal information
- Nationality: Australian
- Born: 25 November 1931 Portland, Victoria, Australia
- Died: October 2023 (aged 91)

Sport
- Sport: Wrestling

Samuel Parker (25 November 1931 – October 2023) was an Australian wrestler. He competed in the men's freestyle featherweight at the 1960 Summer Olympics. Parker died in October 2023, at the age of 91.
