= Jean Schintgen =

Luxembourgish wrestler

Personal information
- Nationality: Luxembourgish
- Born: 23 March 1939 (age 87) Charleroi, Belgium

Sport
- Sport: Wrestling

Jean Schintgen (born 23 March 1939) is a Luxembourgish wrestler. He competed in the men's Greco-Roman featherweight at the 1960 Summer Olympics.
