= Joseph Schmid (wrestler) =

Swiss wrestler

Personal information
- Nationality: Swiss
- Born: 11 September 1934 (age 91) Frutigen, Switzerland

Sport
- Sport: Wrestling

Joseph Schmid (born 11 September 1934) is a Swiss wrestler. He competed in the men's Greco-Roman featherweight at the 1960 Summer Olympics.
