= John Smith (Zambian wrestler) =

Zambian wrestler

Personal information
- Nationality: Northern Rhodesian
- Born: 25 September 1942 (age 83)

Sport
- Sport: Wrestling

John Alan Smith (born 25 September 1942) is a Zambian former wrestler. He competed in the men's freestyle featherweight at the 1964 Summer Olympics.
