= Kim Bong-jo (wrestler) =

South Korean wrestler

Personal information
- Nationality: South Korean
- Born: 29 May 1942 (age 84)

Sport
- Sport: Wrestling

Kim Bong-jo (born 29 May 1942) is a South Korean wrestler. He competed in the men's Greco-Roman featherweight at the 1964 Summer Olympics.
