= Aleksander Rokosa =

Polish gymnast

- Born: 17 July 1936 Brzeziny, Second Polish Republic
- Died: 25 July 2000 (aged 64) Wrocław, Poland
- Height: 1.75 m (5 ft 9 in)

Gymnastics career
- Discipline: Men's artistic gymnastics
- Country represented: Poland
- Club: Orla Brzeziny; Śląska Wrocław; Gwardia Warszawa

Aleksander Rokosa (17 July 1936 – 25 July 2000) was a Polish gymnast. He competed at the 1960 Summer Olympics, the 1964 Summer Olympics and the 1968 Summer Olympics.
