= Wiesław Podobas =

Polish cyclist (born 1936)

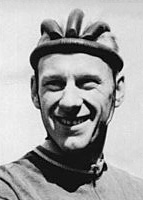
- Podobas in 1960

Personal information
- Born: 20 May 1936 (age 90) Warsaw, Poland
- Height: 1.81 m (5 ft 11 in)
- Weight: 70 kg (150 lb)

Sport
- Sport: Cycling
- Club: Legia Warszawa

Wiesław Jerzy Podobas (born 20 May 1936) is a retired Polish cyclist. He competed at the 1960 Summer Olympics in the 100 km team time trial and finished in 10th place. Individually, he took part in the road race, but failed to finish. He won the Tour de Pologne in 1959.

Podobas graduated from a technical school with a degree of car mechanic, and later also competed as a driver. He is married to Barbara. They live in Warsaw and have three sons, Tadeusz, Piotr and Grzegorz.
