= Bernard Aluchna =

Polish swimmer

Personal information
- Nationality: Polish
- Born: 20 August 1937 (age 88) Warsaw, Poland

Sport
- Sport: Swimming

Bernard Aluchna (born 20 August 1937) is a Polish former freestyle swimmer. He competed in two events at the 1960 Summer Olympics.
