= Alfred Kucharczyk =

Polish gymnast (1937–2020)

- Born: 2 November 1937 Radlin, Second Polish Republic
- Died: 2 December 2020 (aged 83) Wodzisław Śląski, Poland
- Height: 1.70 m (5 ft 7 in)

Gymnastics career
- Discipline: Men's artistic gymnastics
- Country represented: Poland
- Club: Zryw Katowice/Sparta Katowice

Alfred Kucharczyk (2 November 1937 – 2 December 2020) was a Polish gymnast.

He competed at the 1960 Summer Olympics and the 1964 Summer Olympics.

Kucharczyk died from COVID-19 on 2 December 2020, amid the pandemic in Poland.
