= Leif Freij =

Swedish wrestler

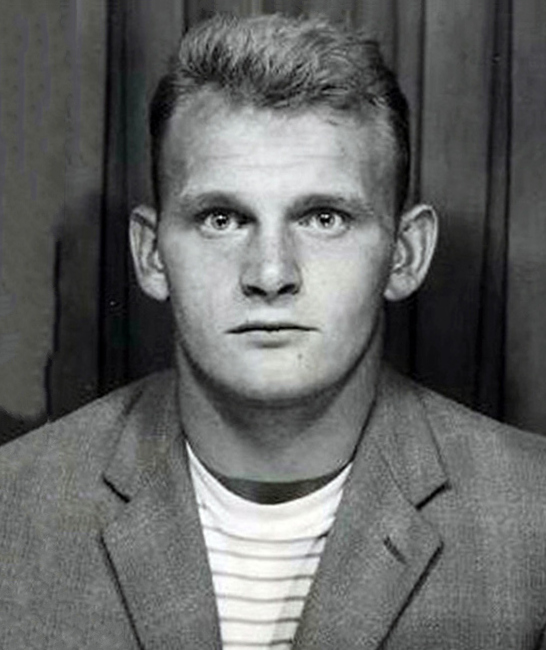

Personal information
- Born: 29 March 1943 Malmö, Sweden
- Died: 17 June 1998 (aged 55) Malmö, Sweden
- Height: 1.69 m (5 ft 7 in)
- Weight: 62 kg (137 lb)

Sport
- Sport: Greco-Roman wrestling
- Club: BK Kärnan, Limhamn, Malmö
Medal record
Representing Sweden
World Wrestling Championships
Silver medal – second place	1966 Toledo	-63 kg

Leif Roland Freij (29 March 1943 – 17 June 1998) was a Swedish Greco-Roman wrestler who won silver medals at the world and European championships in 1966. He finished 16th at the 1960 Summer Olympics and fourth at the 1965 World Championship. His uncle Gustav Freij also competed in Greco-Roman wrestling at the 1960 Olympics.
