= Nour Aka Sayed =

Afghan wrestler (born 1944)

Nour Aka Sayed (born 6 October 1944) is a retired Greco-Roman wrestler of Afghanistan, who competed at the 1964 Summer Olympics in the featherweight event.
