= Czesław Kubiak =

Polish field hockey player

Personal information
- Nationality: Polish
- Born: 25 March 1932 Gniezno, Poland
- Died: 11 July 1996 (aged 64) Poznań, Poland

Sport
- Sport: Field hockey

Czesław Kubiak (25 March 1932 – 11 July 1996) was a Polish field hockey player. He competed in the men's tournament at the 1960 Summer Olympics.
