= Lothar Schneider (wrestler) =

East German wrestler (1939–2019)

Personal information
- Born: 3 October 1939 Dessau, Germany
- Died: 15 March 2019 (aged 79)
- Height: 164 cm (5 ft 5 in)

Sport
- Sport: Greco-Roman wrestling
- Club: SC Leipzig
Medal record
Representing East Germany
World Championships
Bronze medal – third place	1965 Manchester	-63 kg

Lothar Schneider (3 October 1939 – 15 March 2019) was a featherweight Greco-Roman wrestler from East Germany. He won a bronze medal at the 1965 World Championships and placed fourth at the 1966 European Championships. He died on 15 March 2019.
