= Koji Sakurama =

Japanese wrestler

Personal information
- Nationality: Japanese
- Born: 12 February 1938 (age 87); Tokushima, Japan

Sport
- Sport: Wrestling

Koji Sakurama (桜間 幸次, Sakurama Kōji, born 12 February 1938) is a Japanese wrestler. He competed at the 1964 Summer Olympics and the 1968 Summer Olympics.
