= Ernest Hawełek =

Polish gymnast

- Born: 28 January 1935 (age 91) Radlin, Second Polish Republic
- Height: 1.70 m (5 ft 7 in)

Gymnastics career
- Discipline: Men's artistic gymnastics
- Country represented: Poland
- Club: Górnik Radlin

Ernest Hawełek (born 28 January 1935) is a Polish gymnast. He competed in eight events at the 1960 Summer Olympics.
