= Rubén Leibovich =

Argentine wrestler

Personal information
- Nationality: Argentine
- Born: 25 April 1934 (age 90)

Sport
- Sport: Wrestling

Rubén Leibovich (born 25 April 1934) is an Argentine former wrestler. He competed in two events at the 1964 Summer Olympics.
