= Roy Meehan =

New Zealand wrestler

Personal information
- Born: Athol Roy Meehan; 21 July 1931 Auckland, New Zealand
- Died: 19 July 2011 (aged 79) Auckland, New Zealand

Professional wrestling career

Athol Roy Meehan (21 July 1931 – 19 July 2011) was a New Zealand wrestler. He competed at the 1964 Summer Olympics.
