= Umberto Trippa =

Italian wrestler (1931–2015)

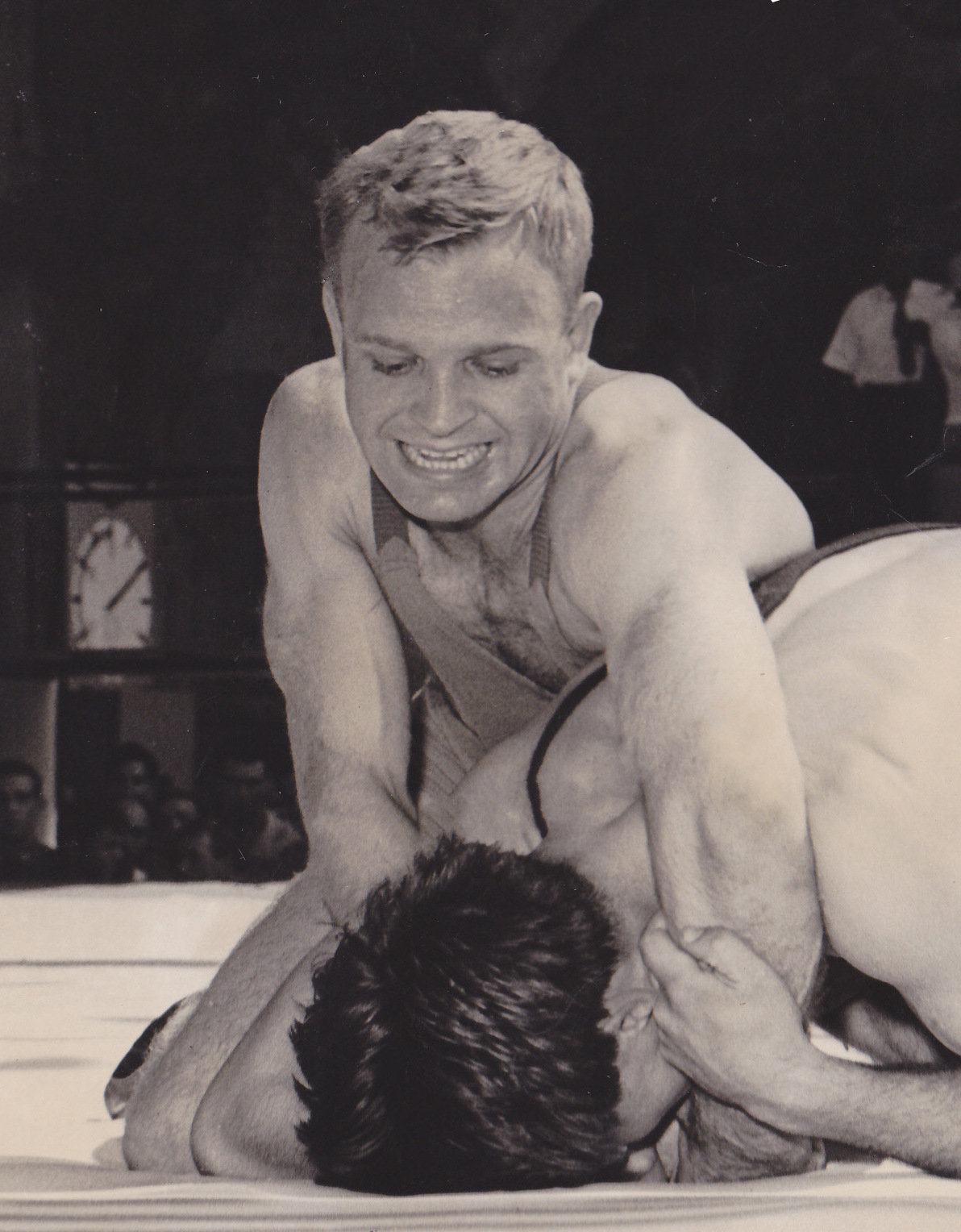
- Umberto Trippa (top) at the 1960 Olympics

Personal information
- Born: 6 April 1931 (age 95) Terni, Italy
- Died: 23 december 2015 (aged 84)
- Height: 1.72 m (5 ft 8 in)

Sport
- Sport: Greco-Roman wrestling
Medal record
Representing Italy
World Championships
Silver medal – second place	1953 Naples	-62 kg

Umberto Trippa (6 April 1931 – 18 December 2015) was an Italian wrestler. He competed in the Greco-Roman featherweight division at the 1952, 1956 and 1960 Olympics and finished in fourth, sixth and fourth place, respectively. He won the silver medal in this event at the 1953 World Championships. Moreover, he was eight times absolute Italian champion.
