= Rudolf Pedersen =

Danish wrestler (1934–2010)

Personal information
- Nationality: Danish
- Born: 18 November 1934 Copenhagen, Denmark
- Died: 22 November 2010 (aged 76)

Sport
- Sport: Wrestling

Rudolf Pedersen (18 November 1934 – 22 November 2010) was a Danish wrestler. He competed in the men's Greco-Roman featherweight at the 1960 Summer Olympics. Pedersen died on 22 November 2010, at the age of 76.
