= Barbara Eustachiewicz =

Polish artistic gymnast (1938–2026)

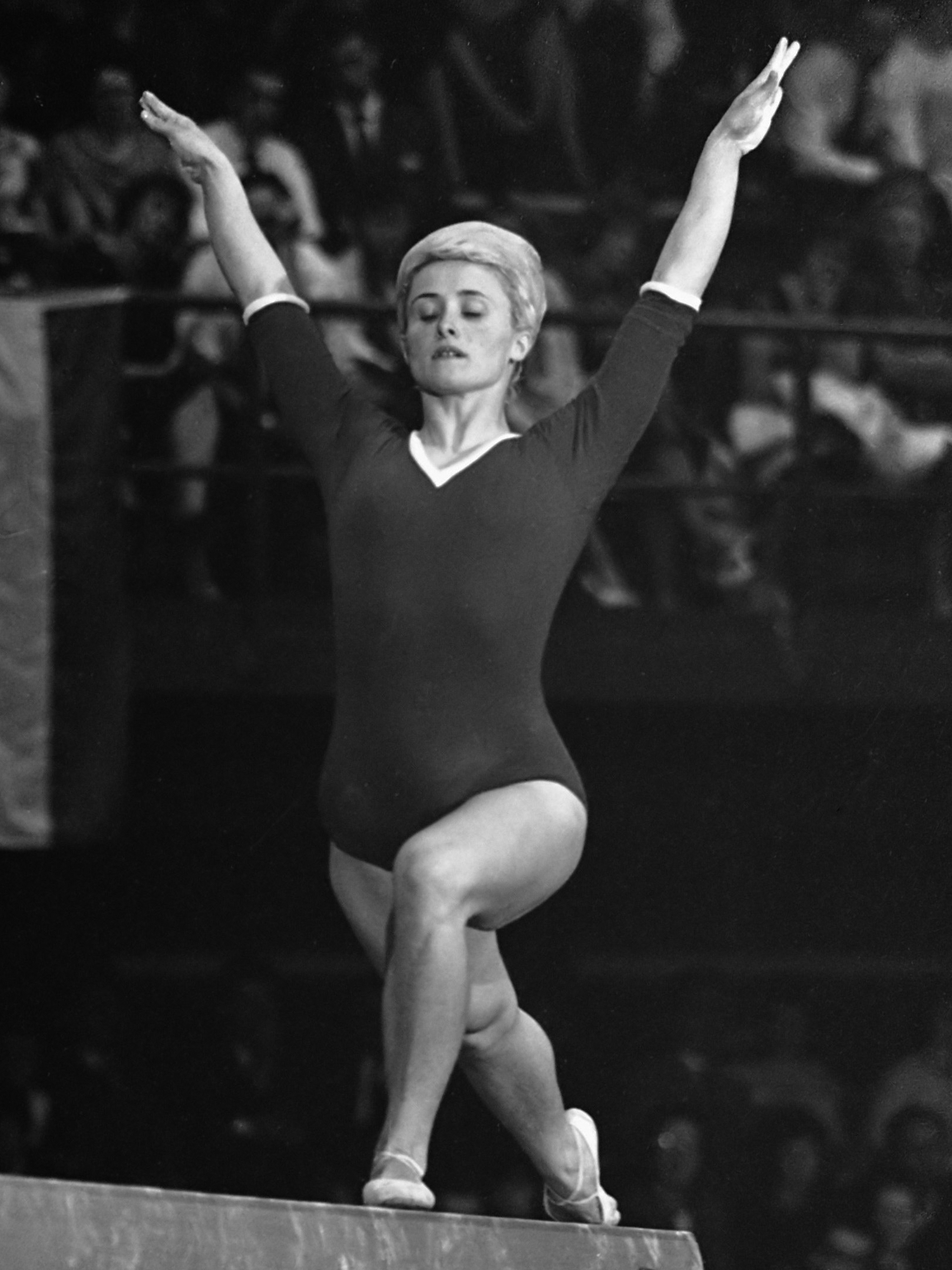
- Eustachiewicz in 1963

Personal information
- Full name: Barbara Halina Eustachiewicz
- Born: 5 November 1938 Katowice, Poland
- Died: 13 January 2026 (aged 87)
- Height: 1.59 m (5 ft 3 in)
- Weight: 59 kg (130 lb)

Sport
- Sport: Artistic gymnastics

Barbara Halina Eustachiewicz (5 November 1938 – 13 January 2026) was a Polish gymnast. She competed at the 1960 and 1964 Summer Olympic Games in all artistic gymnastics events and finished in fifth and seventh place in the team competition, respectively. Her best individual result was 24th place all-around in 1960. Eustachiewicz died on 13 January 2026, at the age of 87.
