= Lee Allen (wrestler) =

American wrestler and coach

Personal information
- Full name: Lee Dale Allen
- Born: December 28, 1934 St. Francis, Kansas, U.S.
- Died: June 11, 2012 (aged 77) El Granada, California, U.S.
- Home town: Sandy, Oregon, U.S.

Sport
- Country: United States
- Sport: Wrestling
- Events: Greco-Roman, Freestyle, and Folkstyle
- College team: Portland State University & University of Oregon
- Team: USA

Lee Dale Allen (December 28, 1934 – June 11, 2012) was an American wrestler and wrestling coach.

== Biography ==
Lee Dale Allen was born on December 28, 1934. Originally from St. Francis, Kansas, Allen and his family moved to Sandy, Oregon (near Portland, Oregon) during the Dust Bowl in 1938. Being a star athlete in high school (winning four state titles), and college level (attending University of Oregon), Allen competed in two Olympics (1956, 1960).

He is one of only two American wrestlers to make an Olympic Team in both Freestyle (1956) and Greco-Roman (1960). Allen was named the assistant coach of the 1972 and the 1976 USA Greco-Roman Olympic Team and was named the Head Coach for the 1980 Olympic Greco-Roman Olympic Team, which was later boycotted (1980 Olympic Boycott). Finally settling down in El Granada, California, he coached Skyline College in San Bruno for over 30 years, helped start BAWA (Bay Area Wrestling Association) and began the first women's wrestling program at Menlo College.

Allen's two daughters (Both alumni of Menlo College) are also wrestlers. He was able to coach both his daughters through college where they both earned a pair of national titles and Most Valuable Wrestler awards as well as earning a Coach of the Year award himself (2009) presented by the WCWA (Women’s College Wrestling Association). In May 2010, Allen announced his retirement as Head Woman's Wrestling Coach at Menlo College. The Beijing Olympian, Marcie Van Dusen, was named the new Head Woman's Wrestling Coach for Menlo College. "We are extremely fortunate to hire someone of Marcie's caliber to continue the great tradition left behind by Lee Allen," Menlo College Athletic Director Keith Spataro said. "We are pleased to be the first intercollegiate wrestling program to hire a female head coach and, in doing so, set the trend for many others to follow."

Allen died on June 11, 2012, at the age of 77.

== Wrestling career ==
World Team Member:

- 1961 (Yokohama, Japan) – Freestyle (136.5 pounds [61.9 kg]; 6th place)

World Team Coach:

- 1973 (Tehran, Iran) – Greco-Roman
- 1977 (Goteborg, Sweden) – Greco-Roman
- 1978 (Mexico City, Mexico) – Greco-Roman
- 1979 (San Diego, Calif., US) – Greco-Roman

Olympic Team Member:

- 1956 (Melbourne, Australia) – Freestyle (125.5 pounds [56.9 kg]; dnp)
- 1960 (Rome, Italy) – Greco-Roman (134.5 pounds [61.0 kg]; 8th place)

Olympic Coach:

- 1980 (Moscow, U.S.S.R.)

Hall of Fame Inductions:

- 1997 – Portland State University Hall of Fame
- 1998 – San Mateo County Sports Hall of Fame
- 2001 – California Wrestling Hall of Fame
- 2003 – Skyline College Hall of Fame
- 2007 – AAU Wrestling Hall of Fame
- 2011 – Oregon Chapter National Wrestling Hall of Fame
- 2013 – California Chapter National Wrestling Hall of Fame
- 2018 – National Wrestling Hall of Fame Distinguished Member
