= Gottlieb Neumair =

German wrestler

Personal information
- Nationality: German
- Born: 14 November 1939 (age 86) Munich, Germany

Sport
- Sport: Wrestling

Gottlieb Neumair (born 14 November 1939) is a German wrestler. He competed in the men's Greco-Roman featherweight at the 1960 Summer Olympics.
