= Jan Flinik =

Polish field hockey player

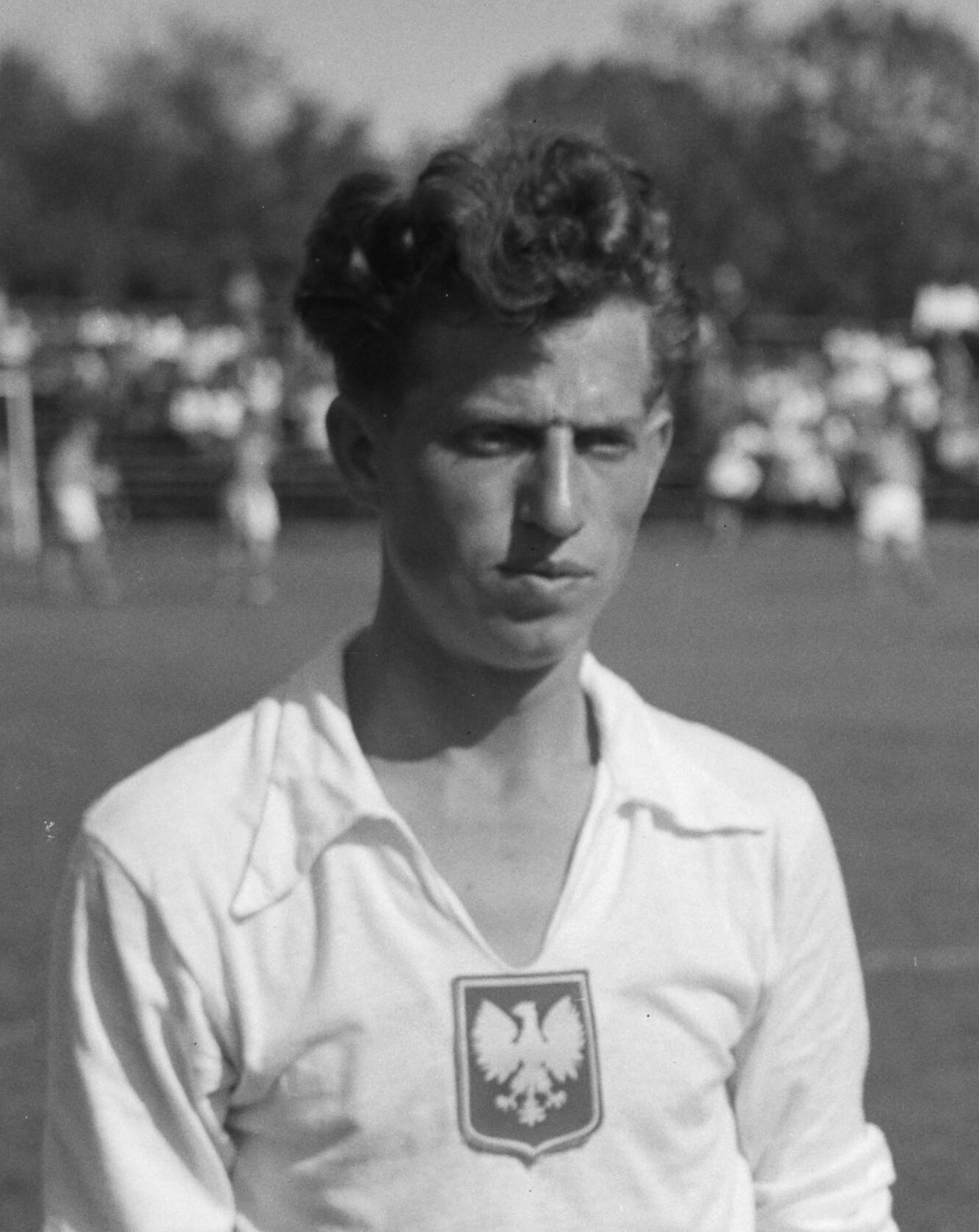
Flinik in 1956

Jan Flinik (9 October 1932 in Gniezno – 27 April 2017 in Gniezno) was a Polish field hockey player who competed in the 1952 Summer Olympics and in the 1960 Summer Olympics.

He was part of the Polish field hockey team, which competed in the 1952 Olympic tournament. He played as forward in the only match for Poland in the main tournament as well as in one match in the consolation tournament.

Eight years later in the 1960 Olympic tournament he played all four matches for Poland.

Flinik died in his native city Gniezno on 27 April 2017 at the age of 84.
