= Osamu Watanabe =

Japanese freestyle wrestler

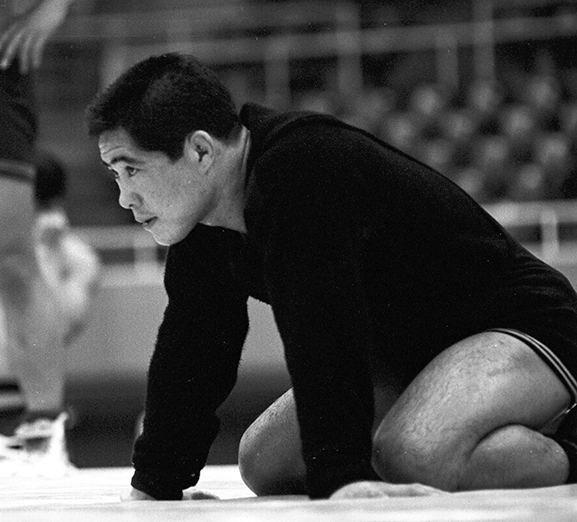
- Osamu Watanabe at the 1964 Olympics

Personal information
- Born: October 21, 1940 Wassamu, Hokkaido, Japan
- Died: October 1, 2022 (aged 81) Tokyo, Japan
- Education: Chuo University
- Height: 1.60 m (5 ft 3 in)
- Weight: 63 kg (139 lb)

Sport
- Sport: Freestyle wrestling
Medal record
Representing Japan
Olympic Games
Gold medal – first place	1964 Tokyo	63 kg
World Championships
Gold medal – first place	1962 Toledo	63 kg
Gold medal – first place	1963 Sofia	63 kg
Asian Games
Gold medal – first place	1962 Jakarta	63 kg

Osamu Watanabe (渡辺 長武, Watanabe Osamu; October 21, 1940 – October 1, 2022) was a Japanese freestyle wrestler. In 1962 (Toledo, Ohio), he debuted internationally and was the reigning world champion, when he capped off his career with a gold medal for Japan in freestyle wrestling at the 1964 Olympics, retiring from competition shortly afterwards as the only undefeated Olympic champion to date at 189–0. He is considered one of the best wrestlers in Olympic history.

In the early 2000s Watanabe resumed competing internationally in the masters category. He died of a heart attack on October 1, 2022.
