= Stancho Kolev =

Bulgarian freestyle wrestler (1937–2025)

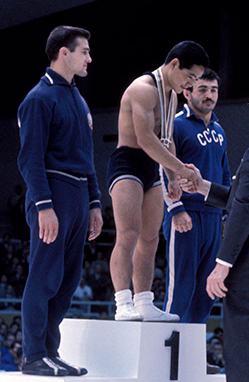
- Kolev (left) at the 1964 Olympics

Personal information
- Born: 11 April 1937 Hristianovo, Stara Zagora, Bulgaria
- Died: 25 November 2025 (aged 88)
- Height: 1.68 m (5 ft 6 in)
- Weight: 62 kg (137 lb)

Sport
- Sport: Freestyle wrestling
- Club: Beroe, Stara Zagora; Armed Forces Sofia; Akademik Club, Sofia
Medal record
Representing Bulgaria
Olympic Games
Silver medal – second place	1960 Rome	Featherweight
Silver medal – second place	1964 Tokyo	Featherweight
World Championships
Silver medal – second place	1959 Tehran	63 kg
Bronze medal – third place	1963 Sofia	63 kg
Silver medal – second place	1965 Manchester	63 kg
World Cup
Bronze medal – third place	1958 Sofia	62 kg

Stancho Kolev Ivanov (Bulgarian: Станчо Колев Иванов, 11 April 1937 – 25 November 2025) was a Bulgarian freestyle wrestler. He competed in the featherweight category at the 1960 and 1964 Olympics and won silver medals on both occasions. Kolev died on 25 November 2025, at the age of 88.
