= Rahal Mahassine =

Moroccan wrestler

Personal information
- Nationality: Moroccan
- Born: 1 August 1939 (age 85); Casablanca, Morocco

Sport
- Sport: Wrestling

Rahal Mahassine (born 1 August 1939) is a Moroccan wrestler. He competed at the 1960 Summer Olympics and the 1968 Summer Olympics.
