= Gizela Niedurny =

Polish gymnast

Personal information
- Nationality: Polish
- Born: 31 January 1939 (age 86); Nowy Bytom, Poland

Sport
- Sport: Gymnastics

Gizela Niedurny (born 31 January 1939) is a Polish gymnast. She competed at the 1960 Summer Olympics and the 1964 Summer Olympics.
