= Jan Chtiej =

Polish cyclist

Personal information
- Born: 9 December 1937 (age 88) Guesnain, France

Cycling career
- Sport: Cycling

Jan Chtiej (born 9 December 1937) is a former Polish cyclist. He competed in the individual road race and team time trial events at the 1960 Summer Olympics.
