= Jan Żurawski =

Polish wrestler (1932–2023)

Personal information
- Nationality: Polish
- Born: 1 January 1932 Warsaw, Poland
- Died: 2 March 2023 (aged 91)

Sport
- Sport: Wrestling

Jan Żurawski (1 January 1932 – 2 March 2023) was a Polish wrestler. He competed in the men's freestyle featherweight at the 1960 Summer Olympics.
