= Leon Wiśniewski =

Polish field hockey player

Personal information
- Nationality: Polish
- Born: 29 March 1937 Gniezno, Poland
- Died: 27 April 1985 (aged 48) Gniezno, Poland

Sport
- Sport: Field hockey

Leon Wiśniewski (29 March 1937 – 27 April 1985) was a Polish field hockey player. He competed in the men's tournament at the 1960 Summer Olympics.
