= Jan Lutomski =

Polish swimmer

Personal information
- Born: 20 January 1937 Poznań, Poland
- Died: 30 December 2016 (aged 79)

Sport
- Sport: Swimming

Jan Lutomski (20 January 1937 – 30 December 2016) was a Polish freestyle swimmer. He competed in two events at the 1960 Summer Olympics.
