= Hossein Mollaghasemi =

Iranian wrestler (1933–2022)

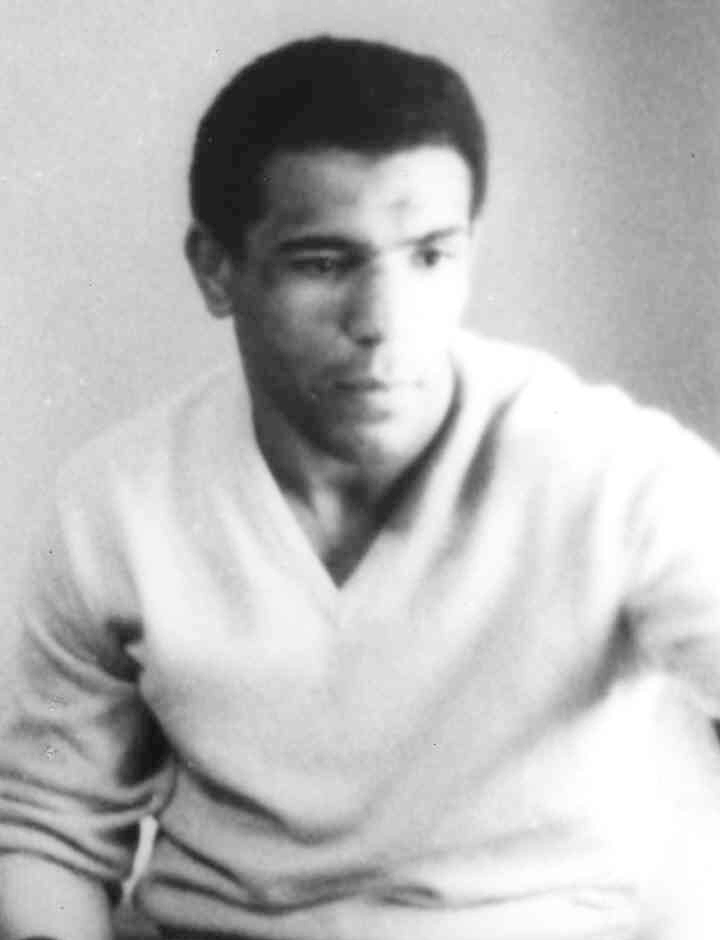

Personal information
- Born: 15 March 1933 Tehran, Iran
- Died: 25 April 2022 (aged 89) Amsterdam, Netherlands
- Height: 1.73 m (5 ft 8 in)

Sport
- Sport: Freestyle wrestling
Medal record
Representing Iran
World Championships
Silver medal – second place	1957 Istanbul	-62 kg

Seyed Hossein Ebrahimian (also Mollaghasemi, Persian: سيد حسين ابراهيميان (ملاقاسمی), 15 March 1933 – 25 April 2022) was a wrestler from Iran. Competing as a freestyle featherweight he won a silver medal at the 1957 World Championships. He then changed to Greco-Roman wrestling and placed fifth-sixth at the world championships in 1961–62. He competed at the 1960 and 1964 Summer Olympics and shared sixth place in 1960.
