= Don Cacas =

Australian wrestler

Personal information
- Nationality: Australian
- Born: 10 July 1931; Adelaide, Australia
- Died: 15 June 2012 (aged 80); Springfield, South Australia

Sport
- Sport: Wrestling

Don Cacas (10 July 1931 – 15 June 2012) was an Australian wrestler. He competed at the 1960 Summer Olympics and the 1964 Summer Olympics.
