= Georges Ballery =

French wrestler

Personal information
- Nationality: French
- Born: 18 July 1937 (age 87); Paris, France

Sport
- Sport: Wrestling

Georges Ballery (born 18 July 1937) is a French wrestler. He competed at the 1960 Summer Olympics and the 1964 Summer Olympics.
