= Jerzy Tracz =

Polish swimmer

Personal information
- Born: 10 February 1943 (age 83) Ostrowiec, Poland

Sport
- Sport: Swimming

Jerzy Tracz (born 10 February 1943) is a Polish former freestyle swimmer. He competed in two events at the 1960 Summer Olympics.
