= Bandu Patil (wrestler) =

Indian wrestler (born 1942)

Personal information
- Nationality: Indian
- Born: 16 September 1942 (age 82)

Sport
- Sport: Wrestling

Bandu Patil (born 16 September 1942) is an Indian wrestler. He competed in two events at the 1964 Summer Olympics.
