= Müzahir Sille =

Turkish wrestler (1931–2016)

Personal information
- Born: 21 September 1931 Istanbul, Turkey
- Died: 17 May 2016 (aged 84)

Sport
- Country: Turkey
- Sport: Olympic wrestling
- Event: Men's Greco-Roman Wrestling
- Club: Istanbul Güreş İK (1949–1961); KSV Witten 07 (1961–1986)
Medal record
Men's Greco-Roman wrestling
Representing Turkey
Olympic Games
| Gold medal – first place | 1960 Rome | 62 kg |
World Championships
| Silver medal – second place | 1958 Budapest | 62 kg |
| Silver medal – second place | 1955 Karlsruhe | 62 kg |
Balkan Championships
| Bronze medal – third place | 1959 Istanbul |

Müzahir Sille (21 September 1931 – 17 May 2016) was a Turkish Olympic champion sports wrestler in the Featherweight class and a trainer. He won the gold medal in Men's Greco-Roman wrestling at the 1960 Olympics.

Born in Istanbul, he began 1949 sports wrestling in the "Istanbul Güreş Ihtisas Kulübü", a club specialized in wrestling. Competing in Greco-Roman style, Müzahir Sille became gold medalist in wrestling at the 1960 Summer Olympics after he won the silver medal twice at World championships and ranked 4th at the 1956 Summer Olympics.

He continued his wrestling career from 1961 on in the wrestling club KSV Witten 07 in Germany along with his teammate Mithat Bayrak, where he became regional champion. After his wrestling career ended, he returned to Istanbul to start several non-profit organizations mainly targeted towards helping the homeless. He lived in Istanbul with his wife, Dinani Sille until he died in 2016.

== Achievements ==
- 1955 World Championships in Karlsruhe, Germany - silver (Featherweight)
- 1956 Olympics in Melbourne, Australia - 4th (Featherweight)
- 1958 World Championships in Budapest, Hungary - silver (Featherweight)
- 1959 Balkan Championships in Istanbul, Turkey - bronze (Featherweight)
- 1960 Olympics in Rome, Italy - gold (Featherweight)
- 1960 Olympics in Rome, Italy - silver (Featherweight)
- 1960 Olympics in Rome, Italy - bronze (Featherweight)
