= Abe Geldenhuys =

South African wrestler (1932–1998)

Personal information
- Nationality: South African
- Born: 20 November 1932; Kuruman, Northern Cape, South Africa
- Died: 17 September 1998 (aged 65); Cape Town, Western Cape, South Africa

Sport
- Sport: Wrestling

Abe Geldenhuys (20 November 1932 – 17 September 1998) was a South African wrestler. He competed at the 1956 Summer Olympics and the 1960 Summer Olympics.
