= Matti Jutila (wrestler) =

Canadian wrestler (1932–2025)

Personal information
- Nationality: Canadian
- Born: 17 September 1932 Nokia, Finland
- Died: 30 March 2025 (aged 92) Sudbury, Ontario, Canada

Sport
- Sport: Wrestling

Matti Jutila (17 September 1932 – 30 March 2025) was a Finnish-Canadian wrestler. He competed in two events at the 1964 Summer Olympics. He emigrated from Finland to Sudbury, Ontario in 1956. Jutila died on 30 March 2025, at the age of 92.
