= Tamiji Sato =

Japanese freestyle wrestler

Personal information
- Born: December 14, 1939 (age 86) Mashike, Hokkaido, Japan
- Height: 1.61 m (5 ft 3 in)
- Weight: 62 kg (137 lb)

Sport
- Sport: Freestyle wrestling

Tamiji Sato (佐藤 多美治, Satō Tamiji; born December 14, 1939) is a retired Japanese freestyle wrestler. He competed at the 1960 Olympics and 1961 World Championships in the 62 kg division and finished fourth on both occasions.
