= Moustafa Hamid Mansour =

Egyptian wrestler

Personal information
- Nationality: Egyptian
- Born: 8 July 1930; Cairo, Egypt
- Died: 3 April 1982 (aged 51)

Sport
- Sport: Wrestling

Moustafa Hamid Mansour (Arabic: مصطفى حامد منصور, 8 July 1930 – 3 April 1982) was an Egyptian wrestler. He competed at the 1960 Summer Olympics and the 1964 Summer Olympics.
