= Andrzej Konopka (gymnast) =

Polish gymnast (1934–1999)

- Full name: Andrzej Marceli Konopka
- Born: 1 September 1934 Sandomierz, Second Polish Republic
- Died: 26 March 1999 (aged 64) Kraków, Poland
- Height: 1.73 m (5 ft 8 in)
- Spouse: Barbara Wilk-Ślizowska

Gymnastics career
- Discipline: Men's artistic gymnastics
- Country represented: Poland
- Club: AZS Warsaw, Legia Warsaw

Andrzej Marceli Konopka (1 September 1934 – 26 March 1999) was a Polish gymnast. He competed at the 1960 Summer Olympics and the 1964 Summer Olympics.
