= Hans Marte =

Austrian wrestler

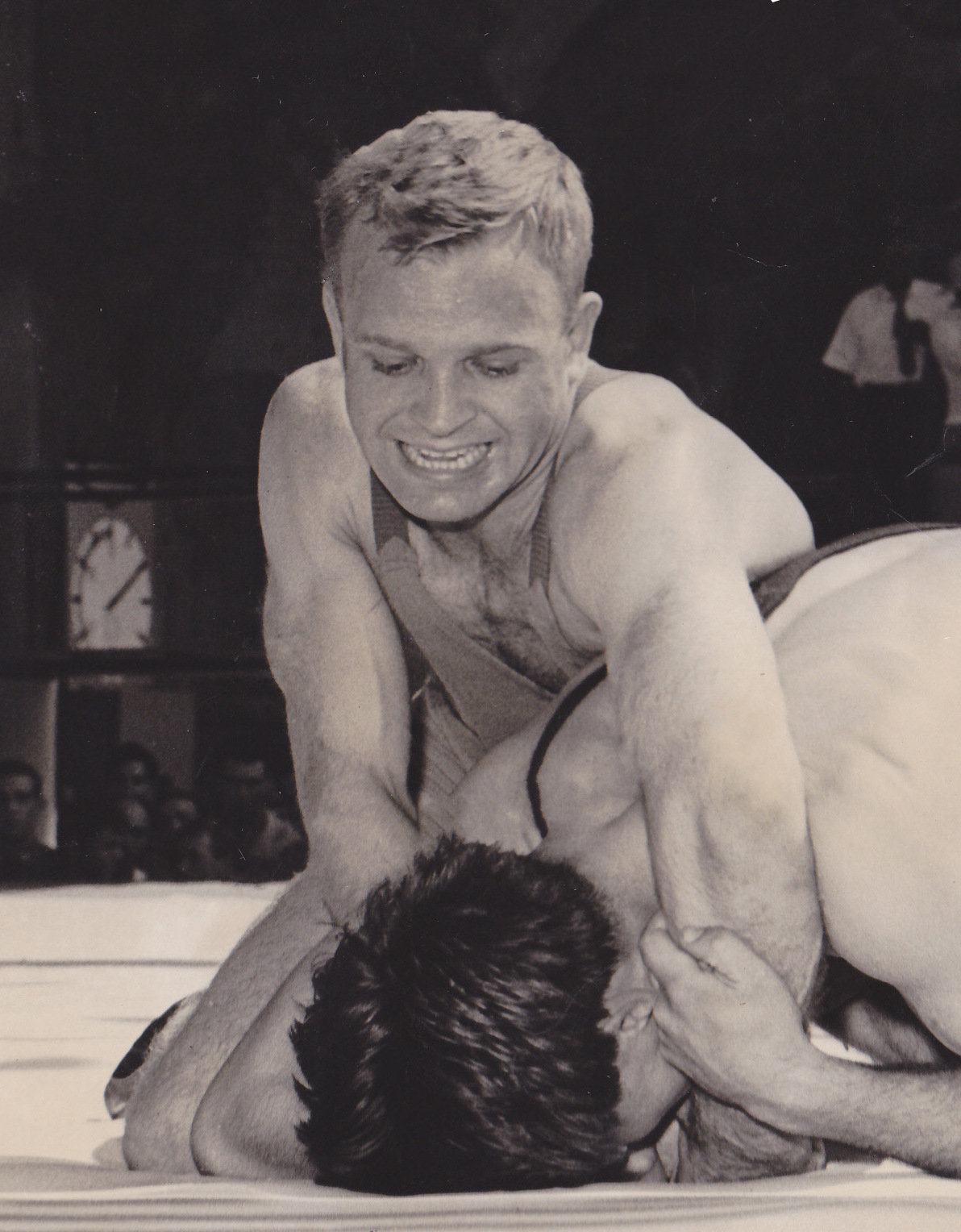
- Umberto Trippa vs Hans Marte 1960 (Marte on the right side with his face down on the floor under pressure of the leading Umberto Trippa)

Personal information
- Nationality: Austrian
- Born: 28 May 1935 (age 91) Vorarlberg, Austria

Sport
- Sport: Wrestling

Hans Marte (born 28 May 1935) is an Austrian wrestler. He competed at the 1960 Summer Olympics and the 1964 Summer Olympics.
