= Kazimierz Macioch =

Polish wrestler

Personal information
- Nationality: Polish
- Born: 1 June 1932 Brok, Poland
- Died: 25 March 2011 (aged 78) Warsaw, Poland

Sport
- Sport: Wrestling

Kazimierz Macioch (1 June 1932 – 26 March 2011) was a Polish wrestler. He competed at the 1960 Summer Olympics and the 1964 Summer Olympics.
