= Fencing at the 1960 Summer Olympics – Women's foil =

Fencing at the Olympics

Women's foil at the Games of the XVII Olympiad
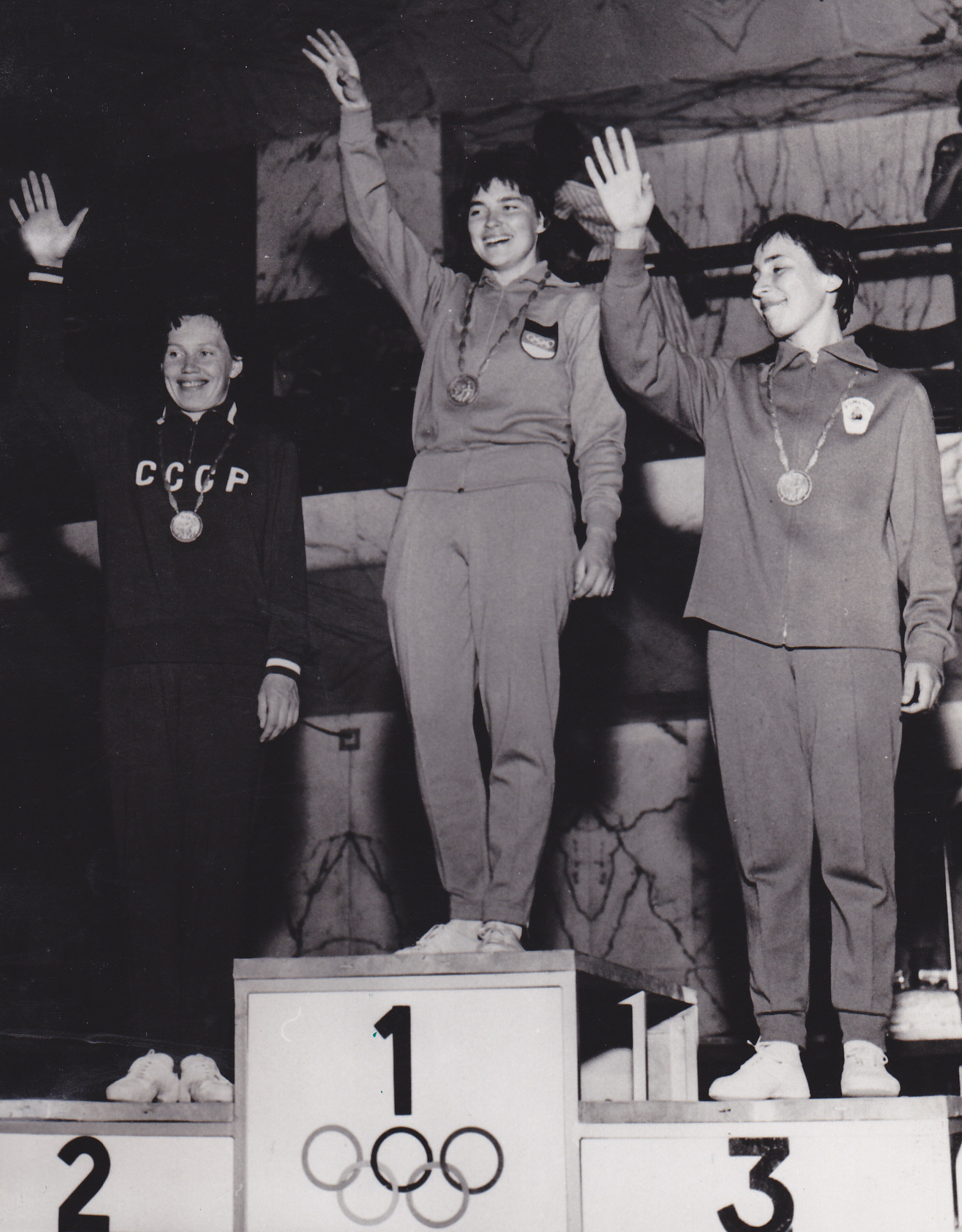
- Valentina Rastvorova, Heidi Schmid and Maria Vicol
- Venue: Palazzo dei Congressi
- Dates: 31 August – 1 September
- Competitors: 56 from 24 nations

Medalists
1st place, gold medalist(s)		Heidi Schmid	United Team of Germany
2nd place, silver medalist(s)		Valentina Rastvorova	Soviet Union
3rd place, bronze medalist(s)		Maria Vicol	Romania

The women's foil was one of eight fencing events on the fencing at the 1960 Summer Olympics programme. It was the eighth appearance of the event. The competition was held from 31 August – 1 September 1960. 56 fencers from 24 nations competed.

== Competition format ==
The competition used a pool play format, with each fencer facing the other fencers in the pool in a round robin. Bouts were to 4 touches. Barrages were used to break ties necessary for advancement. However, only as much fencing was done as was necessary to determine advancement, so some bouts never occurred if the fencers advancing from the pool could be determined. The competition involved 4 rounds:

- Round 1: 9 pools, 6 or 7 fencers to a pool, top 3 advance (total 27 advancing)
- Quarterfinals: 4 pools, 6 or 7 fencers to a pool, top 3 advance (total 12 advancing)
- Semifinals: 2 pools, 6 fencers to a pool, top 4 advance (total 8 advancing)
- Final: 1 pool, 8 fencers

== Results ==
=== Round 1 ===
The top three fencers in each pool advanced.

==== Round 1 Pool A ====
Pos	Fencer	W	L	TF	TA	Qual.	ISUR	HS	JA	CF	CV	MN
1	Ildikó Ságiné Ujlakyné Rejtő (HUN)	4	0	16	5	Q			4–1	4–1	4–0	4–3
2	Heidi Schmid (EUA)	4	0	16	6	Q			4–0	4–3	4–3	4–0
3	Jacqueline Appart (BEL)	3	2	13	12	Q	1–4	0–4		4–3	4–0	4–1
4	Colette Flesch (LUX)	2	3	15	17		1–4	3–4	3–4		4–3	4–2
5	Carmen Vall (ESP)	0	4	6	16		0–4	3–4	0–4	3–4		
6	Maria Nápoles (POR)	0	4	6	16		3–4	0–4	1–4	2–4		

Source: Official Report, p. 841

==== Round 1 Pool B ====
Pos	Fencer	W	L	TF	TA	Qual.	SJ	LSD	MG	JYR	MM	BL
1	Sylwia Julito (POL)	4	1	16	9	Q		4–2	4–1	0–4	4–2	4–0
2	Lídia Sákovicsné Dömölky (HUN)	4	1	18	12	Q	2–4		4–3	4–2	4–3	4–0
3	Maria Grötzer (AUT)	3	2	16	14	B	1–4	3–4		4–2	4–3	4–1
3	Jan York-Romary (USA)	3	2	16	12	B	4–0	2–4	2–4		4–2	4–2
5	Marjatta Moulin (FIN)	1	4	14	16		2–4	3–4	3–4	2–4		4–0
6	Belkis Leal (VEN)	0	5	3	20		0–4	0–4	1–4	2–4	0–4	

Source: Official Report, p. 841

Barrage

Pos	Fencer	W	L	TF	TA	Qual.	MG	JYR
3	Maria Grötzer (AUT)	1	0	4	1	Q		4–1
4	Jan York-Romary (USA)	0	1	1	4		1–4	

Source: Official Report, p. 841

==== Round 1 Pool C ====
Pos	Fencer	W	L	TF	TA	Qual.	TE	BCP	CL	RWS	CW	JW	NS
1	Traudl Ebert (AUT)	5	0	20	8	Q			4–2	4–1	4–3	4–1	4–1
2	Bruna Colombetti-Peroncini (ITA)	4	1	18	11	Q			4–1	2–4	4–1	4–2	4–3
3	Christina Lagerwall (SWE)	4	2	19	15	Q	2–4	1–4		4–1	4–3	4–0	4–3
4	Romy Weiß-Scherberger (EUA)	3	3	16	16		1–4	4–2	1–4		4–1	4–1	2–4
5	Claude Wallet (BEL)	1	4	12	16		3–4	1–4	3–4	1–4		4–0	
6	Johanna Winter (AUS)	1	5	8	22		1–4	2–4	0–4	1–4	0–4		4–2
7	Norma Santini (VEN)	1	4	13	18		1–4	3–4	3–4	4–2		2–4	

Source: Official Report, p. 842

==== Round 1 Pool D ====
Pos	Fencer	W	L	TF	TA	Qual.	EP	ICC	ML	MS	HG	IS
1	Elżbieta Pawlas (POL)	4	1	17	9	Q		4–0	1–4	4–2	4–3	4–0
2	Irene Camber-Corno (ITA)	4	1	16	11	Q	0–4		4–1	4–3	4–1	4–2
3	Monique Leroux (FRA)	3	2	14	13	Q	4–1	1–4		1–4	4–2	4–2
4	Margaret Stafford (GBR)	2	3	15	15		2–4	3–4	4–1		2–4	4–2
5	Helga Gnauer (AUT)	2	3	14	17		3–4	1–4	2–4	4–2		4–3
6	Ingrid Sander (VEN)	0	5	9	20		0–4	2–4	2–4	2–4	3–4	

Source: Official Report, p. 842

==== Round 1 Pool E ====
Pos	Fencer	W	L	TF	TA	Qual.	VR	EOL	PR	ET	SA	PT
1	Valentina Rastvorova (URS)	5	0	20	6	Q		4–1	4–2	4–2	4–1	4–0
2	Ecaterina Orb-Lazăr (ROU)	3	2	15	9	B	1–4		2–4	4–1	4–0	4–0
2	Pilar Roldán (MEX)	3	2	17	12	B	2–4	4–2		3–4	4–0	4–2
2	Evelyn Terhune (USA)	3	2	15	14	B	2–4	1–4	4–3		4–1	4–2
5	Shirley Armstrong (IRL)	1	4	6	17		1–4	0–4	0–4	1–4		4–1
6	Pilar Tosat (ESP)	0	5	5	20		0–4	0–4	2–4	2–4	1–4	

Source: Official Report, p. 842

Barrage

Pos	Fencer	W	L	TF	TA	Qual.	EOL	PR	ET
2	Ecaterina Orb-Lazăr (ROU)	2	0	8	3	Q		4–2	4–1
3	Pilar Roldán (MEX)	1	1	6	5	Q	2–4		4–1
4	Evelyn Terhune (USA)	0	2	2	8		1–4	1–4	

Source: Official Report, p. 842

==== Round 1 Pool F ====
Pos	Fencer	W	L	TF	TA	Qual.	MV	MNK	GG	MS	MGH	BH
1	Maria Vicol (ROU)	4	1	17	9	Q		1–4	4–0	4–0	4–2	4–3
2	Magda Nyári-Kovács (HUN)	4	1	19	11	Q	4–1		4–2	3–4	4–1	4–3
3	Galina Gorokhova (URS)	3	2	14	12	Q	0–4	2–4		4–3	4–0	4–1
4	María Shaw (ESP)	2	3	11	16		0–4	4–3	3–4		0–4	4–1
5	Mary Glen-Haig (GBR)	1	4	8	16		2–4	1–4	0–4	4–0		1–4
6	Barbara Helsingius (FIN)	1	4	12	17		3–4	3–4	1–4	1–4	4–1	

Source: Official Report, p. 843

==== Round 1 Pool G ====
Pos	Fencer	W	L	TF	TA	Qual.	OOS	NK	ARL	MM	WFK	ZU
1	Olga Orban-Szabo (ROU)	4	0	16	1	Q		4–0	4–1	4–0	4–0	
2	Nina Kleijweg (NED)	3	1	12	8	Q	0–4			4–3	4–1	4–0
3	Antonella Ragno-Lonzi (ITA)	3	1	13	7	Q	1–4			4–1	4–2	4–0
4	Marie Melchers (BEL)	1	3	8	14		0–4	3–4	1–4			4–2
5	Wanda Fukała-Kaczmarczyk (POL)	0	3	3	12		0–4	1–4	2–4			
6	Zuus Undapp (INA)	0	3	2	12			0–4	0–4	2–4		

Source: Official Report, p. 843

==== Round 1 Pool H ====
Espino de Saures of Panama was entered in this pool but did not start.

Pos	Fencer	W	L	TF	TA	Qual.	EB	GS	RV	VJ	GR	KB
1	Elly Botbijl (NED)	4	1	17	12	Q		4–2	4–3	1–4	4–2	4–1
2	Gillian Sheen (GBR)	3	2	17	13	B	2–4		3–4	4–2	4–2	4–1
2	Régine Veronnet (FRA)	3	2	16	12	B	3–4	4–3		1–4	4–1	4–0
2	Vera Jeftimijades (YUG)	3	2	14	11	B	4–1	2–4	4–1		0–4	4–1
5	Ginette Rossini (LUX)	2	3	13	14		2–4	2–4	1–4	4–0		4–2
6	Kate Baxter (AUS)	0	5	5	20		1–4	1–4	0–4	1–4	2–4	

Source: Official Report, p. 843

Barrage

Pos	Fencer	W	L	TF	TA	Qual.	GS	RV	VJ
2	Gillian Sheen (GBR)	2	0	8	0	Q		4–0	4–0
3	Régine Veronnet (FRA)	1	1	4	5	Q	0–4		4–1
4	Vera Jeftimijades (YUG)	0	2	1	8		0–4	1–4	

Source: Official Report, p. 843

==== Round 1 Pool I ====
Pos	Fencer	W	L	TF	TA	Qual.	AZ	CD	HM	SGP	GC	HK	DvR
1	Aleksandra Zabelina (URS)	4	2	21	12	Q		4–1	3–4	4–0	2–4	4–1	4–2
2	Catherine Delbarre (FRA)	4	1	17	8	Q	1–4		4–3	4–0	4–0	4–1	
3	Helga Mees (EUA)	4	2	21	16	Q	4–3	3–4		4–3	4–1	2–4	4–1
4	Sioe Gouw Pau (INA)	2	3	11	16		0–4	0–4	3–4		4–1	4–3	
5	Gloria Colón (PUR)	2	3	10	17		4–2	0–4	1–4	1–4		4–3	
6	Harriet King (USA)	2	4	16	19		1–4	1–4	4–2	3–4	3–4		4–1
7	Danny van Rossem (NED)	0	3	4	12		2–4		1–4			1–4	

Source: Official Report, p. 844

=== Quarterfinals ===
==== Quarterfinal A ====
Pos	Fencer	W	L	TF	TA	Qual.	MV	VR	ISUR	ARL	SJ	EB
1	Maria Vicol (ROU)	3	1	15	8	Q		4–1		4–3	4–0	3–4
2	Valentina Rastvorova (URS)	3	1	13	9	Q	1–4		4–1	4–2	4–2	
3	Ildikó Ságiné Ujlakyné Rejtő (HUN)	3	1	13	10	Q		1–4		4–1	4–3	4–2
4	Antonella Ragno-Lonzi (ITA)	1	3	10	13		3–4	2–4	1–4			4–1
5	Sylwia Julito (POL)	1	3	9	14		0–4	2–4	3–4			4–2
6	Elly Botbijl (NED)	1	3	9	15		4–3		2–4	1–4	2–4	

Source: Official Report, p. 844

==== Quarterfinal B ====
Pos	Fencer	W	L	TF	TA	Qual.	OOS	PR	GG	HM	MG	BCP	ML
1	Olga Orban-Szabo (ROU)	5	1	22	12	Q		4–0	2–4	4–0	4–3	4–3	4–2
2	Pilar Roldán (MEX)	4	2	18	14	Q	0–4		2–4	4–2	4–0	4–2	4–2
3	Galina Gorokhova (URS)	3	3	19	18	B	4–2	4–2		2–4	3–4	4–2	2–4
3	Helga Mees (EUA)	3	3	15	18	B	0–4	2–4	4–2		4–2	1–4	4–2
3	Maria Grötzer (AUT)	3	3	17	21	B	3–4	0–4	4–3	2–4		4–3	4–3
6	Bruna Colombetti-Peroncini (ITA)	2	4	18	18		3–4	2–4	2–4	4–1	3–4		4–1
7	Monique Leroux (FRA)	1	5	14	22		2–4	2–4	4–2	2–4	3–4	1–4	

Source: Official Report, p. 845

Barrage

Pos	Fencer	W	L	TF	TA	Qual.	GG	HM	MG
3	Galina Gorokhova (URS)	2	0	8	2	Q		4–0	4–2
4	Helga Mees (EUA)	0	1	0	4		0–4		
5	Maria Grötzer (AUT)	0	1	2	4		2–4		

Source: Official Report, p. 845

==== Quarterfinal C ====
Pos	Fencer	W	L	TF	TA	Qual.	CD	EP	EOL	GS	LSD	NED	JA
1	Catherine Delbarre (FRA)	5	0	20	9	Q		4–1	4–2	4–3	4–1	4–2	
2	Elżbieta Pawlas (POL)	4	2	19	16	Q	1–4		2–4	4–2	4–2	4–2	4–2
3	Ecaterina Orb-Lazăr (ROU)	4	2	20	16	Q	2–4	4–2		4–2	2–4	4–2	4–2
4	Gillian Sheen (GBR)	3	3	19	17		3–4	2–4	2–4		4–1	4–2	4–2
5	Lídia Sákovicsné Dömölky (HUN)	3	3	16	17		1–4	2–4	4–2	1–4		4–2	4–1
6	Nina Kleijweg (NED)	1	5	14	22		2–4	2–4	2–4	2–4	2–4		4–2
7	Jacqueline Appart (BEL)	0	5	9	20			2–4	2–4	2–4	1–4	2–4	

Source: Official Report, p. 845

==== Quarterfinal D ====
Pos	Fencer	W	L	TF	TA	Qual.	MNK	HS	TE	AZ	ICC	RV	CL
1	Magda Nyári-Kovács (HUN)	4	1	17	7	Q			4–0	1–4	4–1	4–1	4–1
2	Heidi Schmid (EUA)	4	1	19	11	Q			4–1	4–3	4–3	3–4	4–0
3	Traudl Ebert (AUT)	3	3	15	18	B	0–4	1–4		4–3	4–3	4–0	2–4
3	Aleksandra Zabelina (URS)	3	3	21	17	B	4–1	3–4	3–4		4–1	4–3	3–4
5	Irene Camber-Corno (ITA)	2	4	16	17		1–4	3–4	3–4	1–4		4–1	4–0
6	Régine Veronnet (FRA)	2	4	13	20		1–4	4–3	0–4	3–4	1–4		4–1
7	Christina Lagerwall (SWE)	2	4	10	21		1–4	0–4	4–2	4–3	0–4	1–4	

Source: Official Report, p. 845

Barrage

Pos	Fencer	W	L	TF	TA	Qual.	TE	AZ
3	Traudl Ebert (AUT)	1	0	4	2	Q		4–2
4	Aleksandra Zabelina (URS)	0	1	2	4		2–4	

Source: Official Report, p. 845

=== Semifinals ===
==== Semifinal A ====
Pos	Fencer	W	L	TF	TA	Qual.	HS	EP	OOS	VR	MNK	EOL
1	Heidi Schmid (EUA)	4	0	16	7	Q			4–1	4–3	4–3	4–0
2	Elżbieta Pawlas (POL)	3	0	12	4	Q				4–2	4–1	4–1
3	Olga Orban-Szabo (ROU)	2	2	11	11	Q	1–4			2–4	4–3	4–0
4	Valentina Rastvorova (URS)	2	3	16	17	Q	3–4	2–4	4–2		4–3	3–4
5	Magda Nyári-Kovács (HUN)	1	4	14	17		3–4	1–4	3–4	3–4		4–1
6	Ecaterina Orb-Lazăr (ROU)	1	4	6	19		0–4	1–4	0–4	4–3	1–4	

Source: Official Report, p. 846

==== Semifinal B ====
Pos	Fencer	W	L	TF	TA	Qual.	GG	PR	TE	MV	CD	ISUR
1	Galina Gorokhova (URS)	4	1	19	11	Q		4–0	3–4	4–3	4–2	4–2
2	Pilar Roldán (MEX)	4	1	16	12	Q	0–4		4–2	4–1	4–3	4–2
3	Traudl Ebert (AUT)	3	2	17	14	Q	4–3	2–4		3–4	4–3	4–0
4	Maria Vicol (ROU)	2	3	15	18	Q	3–4	1–4	4–3		4–3	3–4
5	Catherine Delbarre (FRA)	1	4	15	18		2–4	3–4	3–4	3–4		4–2
6	Ildikó Ságiné Ujlakyné Rejtő (HUN)	1	4	10	19		2–4	2–4	0–4	4–3	2–4	

Source: Official Report, p. 846

=== Final ===
A three-way tie for third place required a barrage for the bronze medal (along with 4th and 5th place). The tie for 6th place was broken by touches received.

Pos	Fencer	W	L	TF	TA	Qual.	HS	VR	MV	GG	OOS	EP	PR	TE
1st place, gold medalist(s)	Heidi Schmid (EUA)	6	1	26	13			4–3	4–1	4–2	4–2	2–4	4–1	4–0
2nd place, silver medalist(s)	Valentina Rastvorova (URS)	5	2	24	12		3–4		4–3	4–1	1–4	4–0	4–0	4–0
3	Maria Vicol (ROU)	4	3	23	18	B	1–4	3–4		3–4	4–0	4–1	4–2	4–3
3	Galina Gorokhova (URS)	4	3	22	19	B	2–4	1–4	4–3		3–4	4–0	4–2	4–2
3	Olga Orban-Szabo (ROU)	4	3	20	20	B	2–4	4–1	0–4	4–3		4–2	2–4	4–2
6	Elżbieta Pawlas (POL)	2	5	14	22		4–2	0–4	1–4	0–4	2–4		4–0	3–4
7	Pilar Roldán (MEX)	2	5	13	25		1–4	0–4	2–4	2–4	4–2	0–4		4–3
8	Traudl Ebert (AUT)	1	6	14	27		0–4	0–4	3–4	2–4	2–4	4–3	3–4	

Source: Official Report, p. 848

Barrage

Pos	Fencer	W	L	TF	TA	MV	GG	OOS
3rd place, bronze medalist(s)	Maria Vicol (ROU)	2	0	8	5		4–3	4–2
4	Galina Gorokhova (URS)	1	1	7	6	3–4		4–2
5	Olga Orban-Szabo (ROU)	0	2	4	8	2–4	2–4	

Source: Official Report, p. 848

== Overall standings ==
Rank	Fencer	Nation	Round 1	Quarterfinals	Semifinals	Final
1st place, gold medalist(s)	Heidi Schmid	United Team of Germany	2	2	1	1
2nd place, silver medalist(s)	Valentina Rastvorova	Soviet Union	1	2	4	2
3rd place, bronze medalist(s)	Maria Vicol	Romania	1	1	4	3
4	Galina Gorokhova	Soviet Union	3	3	1	4
5	Olga Orban-Szabo	Romania	1	1	3	5
6	Elżbieta Pawlas	Poland	1	2	2	6
7	Pilar Roldán	Mexico	3	2	2	7
8	Traudl Ebert	Austria	1	3	3	8
9	Magda Nyári-Kovács	Hungary	2	1	5	Did not advance
9	Catherine Delbarre	France	2	1	5	Did not advance
11	Ecaterina Orb-Lazăr	Romania	2	3	5	Did not advance
11	Ildikó Ságiné Ujlakyné Rejtő	Hungary	1	3	5	Did not advance
13	Antonella Ragno-Lonzi	Italy	3	4	did not advance	
13	Helga Mees	United Team of Germany	3	4	did not advance	
13	Gillian Sheen	Great Britain	2	4	did not advance	
13	Aleksandra Zabelina	Soviet Union	1	4	did not advance	
17	Sylwia Julito	Poland	1	5	did not advance	
17	Maria Grötzer	Austria	3	5	did not advance	
17	Lídia Sákovicsné Dömölky	Hungary	2	5	did not advance	
17	Irene Camber-Corno	Italy	2	5	did not advance	
21	Elly Botbijl	Netherlands	1	6	did not advance	
21	Bruna Colombetti-Peroncini	Italy	2	6	did not advance	
21	Nina Kleijweg	Netherlands	2	6	did not advance	
21	Régine Veronnet	France	3	6	did not advance	
25	Monique Leroux	France	3	7	did not advance	
25	Jacqueline Appart	Belgium	3	7	did not advance	
25	Christina Lagerwall	Sweden	3	7	did not advance	
28	Colette Flesch	Luxembourg	4	did not advance		
28	Jan York-Romary	United States	4	did not advance		
28	Romy Weiß-Scherberger	United Team of Germany	4	did not advance		
28	Margaret Stafford	Great Britain	4	did not advance		
28	Evelyn Terhune	United States	4	did not advance		
28	María Shaw	Spain	4	did not advance		
28	Marie Melchers	Belgium	4	did not advance		
28	Vera Jeftimijades	Yugoslavia	4	did not advance		
28	Sioe Gouw Pau	Indonesia	4	did not advance		
37	Carmen Vall	Spain	5	did not advance		
37	Marjatta Moulin	Finland	5	did not advance		
37	Claude Wallet	Belgium	5	did not advance		
37	Helga Gnauer	Austria	5	did not advance		
37	Shirley Armstrong	Ireland	5	did not advance		
37	Mary Glen-Haig	Great Britain	5	did not advance		
37	Wanda Fukała-Kaczmarczyk	Poland	5	did not advance		
37	Ginette Rossini	Luxembourg	5	did not advance		
37	Gloria Colón	Puerto Rico	5	did not advance		
46	Maria Nápoles	Portugal	6	did not advance		
46	Belkis Leal	Venezuela	6	did not advance		
46	Johanna Winter	Australia	6	did not advance		
46	Ingrid Sander	Venezuela	6	did not advance		
46	Pilar Tosat	Spain	6	did not advance		
46	Barbara Helsingius	Finland	6	did not advance		
46	Zuus Undapp	Indonesia	6	did not advance		
46	Kate Baxter	Australia	6	did not advance		
46	Harriet King	United States	6	did not advance		
55	Norma Santini	Venezuela	7	did not advance		
55	Danny van Rossem	Netherlands	7	did not advance		
