= Fencing at the 1960 Summer Olympics – Women's team foil =

Olympic fencing tournament

Women's team foil at the Games of the XVII Olympiad
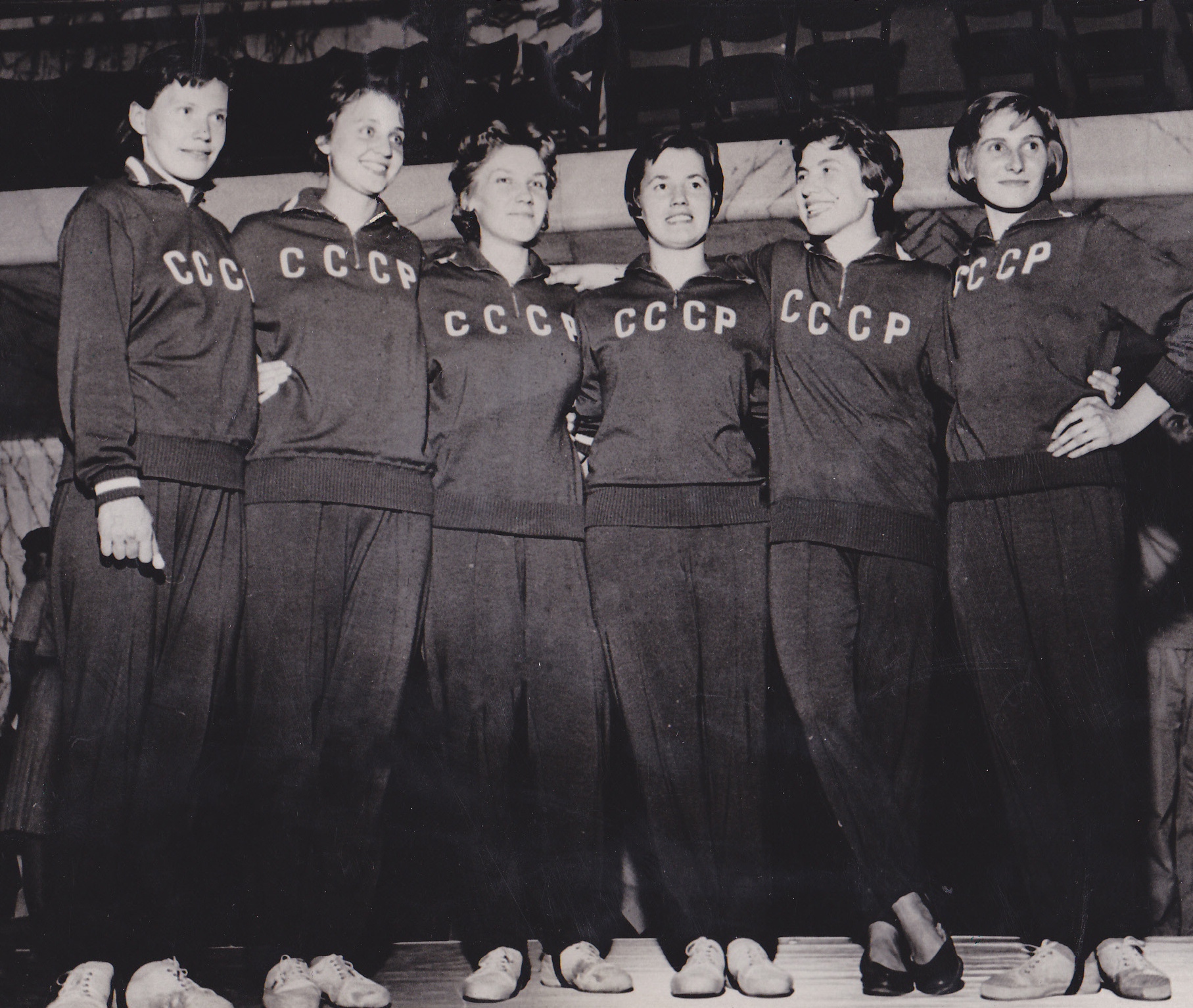
- The Soviet team
- Venue: Palazzo dei Congressi
- Dates: 3 September
- Competitors: 57 from 12 nations

Medalists
1st place, gold medalist(s)		Valentina Rastvorova, Galina Gorokhova, Tatyana Petrenko-Samusenko, Lyudmila Shishova, Valentina Prudskova, Aleksandra Zabelina	Soviet Union
2nd place, silver medalist(s)		Ildikó Ságiné Ujlakyné Rejtő, Györgyi Marvalics-Székely, Magda Nyári-Kovács, Katalin Nagyné Juhász, Lídia Sákovicsné Dömölky	Hungary
3rd place, bronze medalist(s)		Antonella Ragno-Lonzi, Irene Camber-Corno, Velleda Cesari, Bruna Colombetti-Peroncini, Claudia Pasini	Italy

The women's team foil was one of eight fencing events on the fencing at the 1960 Summer Olympics programme. It was the first appearance of the event. The competition was held on 3 September 1960. 57 fencers from 12 nations competed. The winner of the tournament was the Soviet Union, followed by Hungary and Italy in third.

== Competition format ==
The competition combined pool play with knockout rounds. The first round consisted of pools, with the 12 teams entered in the competition divided into 4 pools of 3 teams. The top 2 teams in each pool after a round-robin advanced. The 8 teams remaining after the pool play competed in a three-round single-elimination bracket, with a bronze medal match between the semifinal losers.

Each team match consisted of each of the four fencers on one team facing each fencer on the other team, for a maximum of 16 total bouts. An 8–8 tie would be resolved by touches received. Bouts were to 4 touches. Only as much fencing was done as was necessary to determine pool placement (in the first round) or the winning team (in the knockout rounds), so not all matches went to the full 16 bouts but instead stopped early (typically when one team had 9 bouts won).

== Rosters ==
Austria

- Helga Gnauer
- Traudl Ebert
- Waltraut Peck-Repa
- Maria Grötzer

France

- Monique Leroux
- Régine Veronnet
- Françoise Mailliard
- Renée Garilhe
- Catherine Delbarre

Germany

- Heidi Schmid
- Helga Mees
- Helga Stroh
- Helmi Höhle
- Gundi Theuerkauff
- Romy Weiß-Scherberger

Great Britain

- Gillian Sheen
- Jeannette Bailey
- Shirley Netherway
- Mary Glen-Haig

Hungary

- Ildikó Ságiné Ujlakyné Rejtő
- Györgyi Marvalics-Székely
- Magda Nyári-Kovács
- Katalin Nagyné Juhász
- Lídia Sákovicsné Dömölky

Italy

- Antonella Ragno-Lonzi
- Irene Camber-Corno
- Velleda Cesari
- Bruna Colombetti-Peroncini
- Claudia Pasini

Netherlands

- Nina Kleijweg
- Danny van Rossem
- Leni Kokkes-Hanepen
- Elly Botbijl

Poland

- Elżbieta Pawlas
- Sylwia Julito
- Barbara Orzechowska-Ryszel
- Genowefa Migas-Stawarz
- Wanda Fukała-Kaczmarczyk

Romania

- Ecaterina Orb-Lazăr
- Eugenia Mateianu
- Olga Orban-Szabo
- Maria Vicol

Soviet Union

- Valentina Rastvorova
- Galina Gorokhova
- Tatyana Petrenko-Samusenko
- Lyudmila Shishova
- Valentina Prudskova
- Aleksandra Zabelina

United States

- Judy Goodrich
- Jan York-Romary
- Maxine Mitchell
- Harriet King
- Evelyn Terhune

Venezuela

- Ingrid Sander
- Norma Santini
- Belkis Leal
- Teófila Márquiz

== Results ==
=== Round 1 ===
==== Pool A ====
Italy defeated Venezuela, as did the Soviet Union. This eliminated Venezuela; Italy and the Soviet Union faced off to determine their placing within the group. The Soviet Union took first in the group with a win over Italy.

Pos	Team	W	L	BW	BL	Qual.	URS	ITA	VEN
1	Soviet Union	2	0	22	7	Q		9–4	13–3
2	Italy	1	1	17	12	Q	4–9		13–3
3	Venezuela	0	2	6	26		3–13	3–13	

Source: Official Report, p. 849
Legend: Blue = home team win; Yellow = draw; Red = away team win.

==== Pool B ====
Romania defeated Great Britain, as did Hungary. This eliminated Great Britain; Romania and Hungary faced off to determine their placing within the group. Hungary took first in the group with a win over Romania.

Pos	Team	W	L	BW	BL	Qual.	HUN	ROU	GBR
1	Hungary	2	0	19	13	Q		9–7	10–6
2	Romania	1	1	19	13	Q	7–9		12–4
3	Great Britain	0	2	10	22		6–10	4–12	

Source: Official Report, p. 850
Legend: Blue = home team win; Yellow = draw; Red = away team win.

==== Pool C ====
The Netherlands defeated Austria, as did Germany. This eliminated Austria; the Netherlands and Germany faced off to determine their placing within the group. Germany took first in the group with a win over the Netherlands.

Pos	Team	W	L	BW	BL	Qual.	EUA	NED	AUT
1	United Team of Germany	2	0	19	9	Q		9–3	10–6
2	Netherlands	1	1	13	15	Q	3–9		10–6
3	Austria	0	2	12	20		6–10	6–10	

Source: Official Report, p. 851
Legend: Blue = home team win; Yellow = draw; Red = away team win.

==== Pool D ====
The United States and Poland fenced to a tie, 8 bouts to 8 and 47 touches received to 47. France defeated the United States. Poland defeated France.

Pos	Team	W	L	BW	BL	Qual.	POL	FRA	USA
1	Poland	1.5	0.5	17	14	Q		9–6	8–8
2	France	1	1	16	15	Q	6–9		10–6
3	United States	0.5	1.5	14	18		8–8	6–10	

Source: Official Report, p. 852
Legend: Blue = home team win; Yellow = draw; Red = away team win.

=== Elimination rounds ===
Quarter-finals
A1	Soviet Union	8 (46)
D2	France	8 (48)
C1	United Team of Germany	9
B2	Romania	4
B1	Hungary	9
C2	Netherlands	3
D1	Poland	5
A2	Italy	9

Semi-finals
Soviet Union	9
United Team of Germany	3
Hungary	9
Italy	3

Finals
Soviet Union	9
Hungary	3
Third place
United Team of Germany	2
Italy	9

== Final classification ==
Rank	Nation
1st place, gold medalist(s)	Soviet Union
2nd place, silver medalist(s)	Hungary
3rd place, bronze medalist(s)	Italy
4	United Team of Germany
5	France
5	Netherlands
5	Poland
5	Romania
9	Austria
9	Great Britain
9	United States
9	Venezuela
