= Netherlands at the 1960 Summer Olympics =

- Flag of the Netherlands
- IOC code: NED (PBA used at these Games)
- NOC: Dutch Olympic Committee

in Rome
- Competitors: 110 (80 men and 30 women) in 13 sports
- Flag bearer: Jan Willem van Erven Dorens
- Medals Ranked 28th: Gold 0 Silver 1 Bronze 2 Total 3

Summer Olympics appearances (overview)
- 1900; 1904; 1908; 1912; 1920; 1924; 1928; 1932; 1936; 1948; 1952; 1956; 1960; 1964; 1968; 1972; 1976; 1980; 1984; 1988; 1992; 1996; 2000; 2004; 2008; 2012; 2016; 2020; 2024

Other related appearances
- 1906 Intercalated Games

The Netherlands competed at the 1960 Summer Olympics in Rome, Italy. 110 competitors, 80 men and 30 women, took part in 54 events in 13 sports.

== Medalists ==
=== Silver ===
- Marianne Heemskerk – Swimming, Women's 100m Butterfly

=== Bronze ===
- Wieger Mensonides – Swimming, Men's 200m Breaststroke
- Tineke Lagerberg – Swimming, Women's 400m Freestyle

== Cycling ==
Thirteen male cyclists represented the Netherlands in 1960.

Individual road race

- Jan Hugens
- Jan Janssen
- René Lotz
- Lex van Kreuningen

Team time trial

- Jan Hugens
- René Lotz
- Ab Sluis
- Lex van Kreuningen

Sprint

- Piet van der Touw
- Aad de Graaf

1000m time trial

- Piet van der Touw

Tandem

- Rinus Paul
- Mees Gerritsen

Team pursuit

- Jaap Oudkerk
- Theo Nikkessen
- Henk Nijdam
- Piet van der Lans

== Diving ==
Women

Athlete	Event	Preliminary		Semi-final				Final			
Athlete	Event	Points	Rank	Points	Rank	Total	Rank	Points	Rank	Total	Rank
Greta Lugthart	3 m springboard	46.03	15 Q	34.36	15	80.39	15	Did not advance			
Dorothea du Pon	3 m springboard	51.20	6 Q	37.61	5	88.81	6	34.54	8	123.35	8

== Fencing ==
Five fencers, one man and four women, represented the Netherlands in 1960.

Men's épée

- Max Dwinger

Women's foil

- Elly Botbijl
- Nina Kleijweg
- Daniëlle van Rossem

Women's team foil

- Nina Kleijweg, Daniëlle van Rossem, Leni Kokkes-Hanepen, Elly Botbijl

== Rowing ==
The Netherlands had 13 male rowers participate in five out of seven rowing events in 1960.

Men's single sculls

- Lex Redelé

Men's double sculls – 5th place

- Peter Bakker
- Co Rentmeester

Men's coxless pair

- Steven Blaisse
- Ernst Veenemans

Men's coxed pair

- Maarten van Dis
- Arnold Wientjes
- Jan Just Bos

Men's coxed four

- Toon de Ruiter
- Frank Moerman
- Ype Stelma
- Henk Wamsteker
- Marius Klumperbeek

== Sailing ==
Finn

- Hans Sleeswijk 24th, 2265 points

Flying Dutchman

- Ben Verhagen & Gerardus Lautenschutz 5th, 5452 points

== Swimming ==
Men

Athlete	Event	Heat		Semifinal		Final	
Athlete	Event	Time	Rank	Time	Rank	Time	Rank
Jan Bouwman	100 m freestyle	58.8	29	Did not advance			
Ron Kroon	100 m freestyle	57.7	18 Q	57.9	17	Did not advance	
Jan Jiskoot	100 m backstroke	1:05.9	=20	Did not advance			
Wieger Mensonides	200 m breaststroke	2:39.0	2 Q	2:39.3	5 Q	2:39.7	3rd place, bronze medalist(s)
Gerrit Korteweg	200 m butterfly	2:26.4	20	Did not advance			
Bert Sitters	200 m butterfly	2:36.6	29	Did not advance			
Jan Jiskoot; Wieger Mensonides; Gerrit Korteweg; Ron Kroon	4 × 100 m medley	4:16.1	6 Q	—N/a		4:18.2	8

Women

Athlete	Event	Heat		Semifinal		Final	
Athlete	Event	Time	Rank	Time	Rank	Time	Rank
Cocki van Engelsdorp Gastelaars	100 m freestyle	1:03.9	4 Q	1:03.9	6 Q	1:04.7	7
Erica Terpstra	100 m freestyle	1:04.4	=7 Q	1:03.7	5 Q	1:04.3	6
Tineke Lagerberg	400 m freestyle	4:57.0	4 Q	—N/a		4:56.9	3rd place, bronze medalist(s)
Corrie Schimmel	400 m freestyle	5:00.1	8 Q	—N/a		5:02.3	7
Rini Dobber	100 m backstroke	1:14.2	17	—N/a		Did not advance	
Ria van Velsen	100 m backstroke	1:11.1	2 Q	—N/a		1:12.1	7
Ada den Haan	200 m breaststroke	2:54.0	3 Q	—N/a		2:54.4	4
Gretta Kok	200 m breaststroke	2:55.2	5 Q	—N/a		2:54.6	5
Marianne Heemskerk	100 m butterfly	1:11.0	3 Q	—N/a		1:10.4	2nd place, silver medalist(s)
Atie Voorbij	100 m butterfly	1:12.4	6 Q	—N/a		1:13.3	5
Hennie van der Velde; Jopie Troost; Sieta Posthumus; Cocki van Engelsdorp Gastelaars	4 × 100 m freestyle	DSQ		—N/a		Did not advance	
Ria van Velsen; Ada den Haan; Marianne Heemskerk; Erica Terpstra; Tineke Lagerberg	4 × 100 m medley	4:47.4	1 Q	—N/a		4:47.6	4

== Water polo ==
Men's Team Competition

- Preliminary Round (Group C)

- Lost to Yugoslavia (1–2)
- Defeated Australia (5–3)
- Tied with South Africa (3–3)

- Semi Final Round (Group 2)

- Lost to Hungary (1–3)
- Lost to United States (6–7)

- Classification Round (5th/8th)

- Lost to Romania (4–5)
- Lost to Germany (5–6) → 8th place

- Team Roster

- Fred van Dorp
- Henk Hermsen
- Ben Kniest
- Harry Lamme
- Bram Leenards
- Hans Muller
- Harro Ran
- Harry Vriend
- Fred van der Zwan
