= Fencing at the 1956 Summer Olympics – Women's foil =

Fencing at the Olympics

Women's foil at the Games of the XVI Olympiad
- Venue: St Kilda Town Hall
- Dates: 29 November
- Competitors: 23 from 11 nations

Medalists
1st place, gold medalist(s)		Gillian Sheen	Great Britain
2nd place, silver medalist(s)		Olga Orban-Szabo	Romania
3rd place, bronze medalist(s)		Renée Garilhe	France

The women's foil was one of seven fencing events on the fencing at the 1956 Summer Olympics programme. It was the seventh appearance of the event. The competition was held on 29 November 1956. 23 fencers from 11 nations competed.

== Competition format ==
The competition used a pool play format, with each fencer facing the other fencers in the pool in a round robin. Bouts were to 4 touches. Barrages were used to break ties necessary for advancement (touches against were the first tie-breaker used to give ranks when the rank did not matter). However, only as much fencing was done as was necessary to determine advancement, so some bouts never occurred if the fencers advancing from the pool could be determined.

== Results ==
=== Round 1 ===
The top 4 fencers in each pool advanced to the semifinals.

==== Pool 1 ====
Rank	Fencer	Nation	Wins	Losses	TF	TA	Notes
1	Maxine Mitchell	United States	5	1	21	15	Qualified for semifinals
2	Emma Yefimova	Soviet Union	4	2	21	10	Qualified for semifinals
3	Lídia Sákovicsné Dömölky	Hungary	4	2	19	14	Qualified for semifinals
4	Catherine Delbarre	France	3	3	17	14	Qualified for semifinals Won barrage vs. Cesari 4–2
5	Velleda Cesari	Italy	3	3	17	17	Lost barrage vs. Delbarre 2–4
6	Mary Glen-Haig	Great Britain	2	4	12	21	
7	Denise O'Brien	Australia	0	6	8	24	

==== Pool 2 ====
Rank	Fencer	Nation	Wins	Losses	TF	TA	Notes
1	Jan York-Romary	United States	5	2	23	17	Qualified for semifinals
2	Ellen Müller-Preis	Austria	5	2	22	19	Qualified for semifinals
3	Bruna Colombetti-Peroncini	Italy	4	3	25	19	Qualified for semifinals
4	Pilar Roldán	Mexico	4	3	22	23	Qualified for semifinals
5	Ecaterina Orb-Lazăr	Romania	3	4	18	18	
6	Nadezhda Shitikova	Soviet Union	3	4	21	22	
7	Régine Veronnet	France	3	4	22	23	
8	Lois Joseph	Australia	1	6	18	29	

==== Pool 3 ====
Rank	Fencer	Nation	Wins	Losses	TF	TA	Notes
1	Gillian Sheen	Great Britain	6	1	27	10	Qualified for semifinals
2	Olga Orban-Szabo	Romania	5	1	21	17	Qualified for semifinals
3	Renée Garilhe	France	5	2	24	19	Qualified for semifinals
4	Karen Lachmann	Denmark	4	3	20	21	Qualified for semifinals
5	Valentina Rastvorova	Soviet Union	3	4	22	21	
6	Judy Goodrich	United States	3	4	17	24	
7	Magda Nyári-Kovács	Hungary	1	5	15	20	
8	Joy Hardon	Australia	0	7	12	28	

=== Semifinals ===
The top 4 fencers in each pool advanced to the final.

==== Semifinal 1 ====
Rank	Fencer	Nation	Wins	Losses	TF	TA	Notes
1	Bruna Colombetti-Peroncini	Italy	4	0	16	2	Qualified for final
2	Karen Lachmann	Denmark	4	0	16	6	Qualified for final
3	Renée Garilhe	France	3	2	17	14	Qualified for final
4	Ellen Müller-Preis	Austria	2	3	14	12	Qualified for final
5	Emma Yefimova	Soviet Union	1	4	9	17	
6	Maxine Mitchell	United States	0	5	2	20	

==== Semifinal 2 ====
Rank	Fencer	Nation	Wins	Losses	TF	TA	Notes
1	Catherine Delbarre	France	4	1	18	11	Qualified for final
2	Jan York-Romary	United States	3	2	15	13	Qualified for final
3	Olga Orban-Szabo	Romania	3	2	15	14	Qualified for final
4	Gillian Sheen	Great Britain	2	3	13	13	Qualified for final Won barrage vs. Sákovicsné Dömölky 4–2
5	Lídia Sákovicsné Dömölky	Hungary	2	3	15	14	Lost barrage vs. Sheen 2–4
6	Pilar Roldán	Mexico	1	4	8	19	

=== Final ===
Orban-Szabo defeated Sheen in the round-robin, but had to face her again in a barrage after finishing tied at 6–1 (Orban-Szabo had lost to Garilhe). In the barrage, Sheen was the victor to win the gold medal.

Rank	Fencer	Nation	Wins	Losses	TF	TA	Notes
1st place, gold medalist(s)	Gillian Sheen	Great Britain	6	1	26	20	Won barrage vs. Orban-Szabo 4–2
2nd place, silver medalist(s)	Olga Orban-Szabo	Romania	6	1	27	17	Lost barrage vs. Sheen 2–4
3rd place, bronze medalist(s)	Renée Garilhe	France	5	2	26	14	
4	Jan York-Romary	United States	4	3	21	23	
5	Catherine Delbarre	France	3	4	20	25	
6	Karen Lachmann	Denmark	2	5	17	20	
7	Ellen Müller-Preis	Austria	1	6	20	25	
8	Bruna Colombetti-Peroncini	Italy	1	6	14	27	
