= Venezuela at the 1960 Summer Olympics =

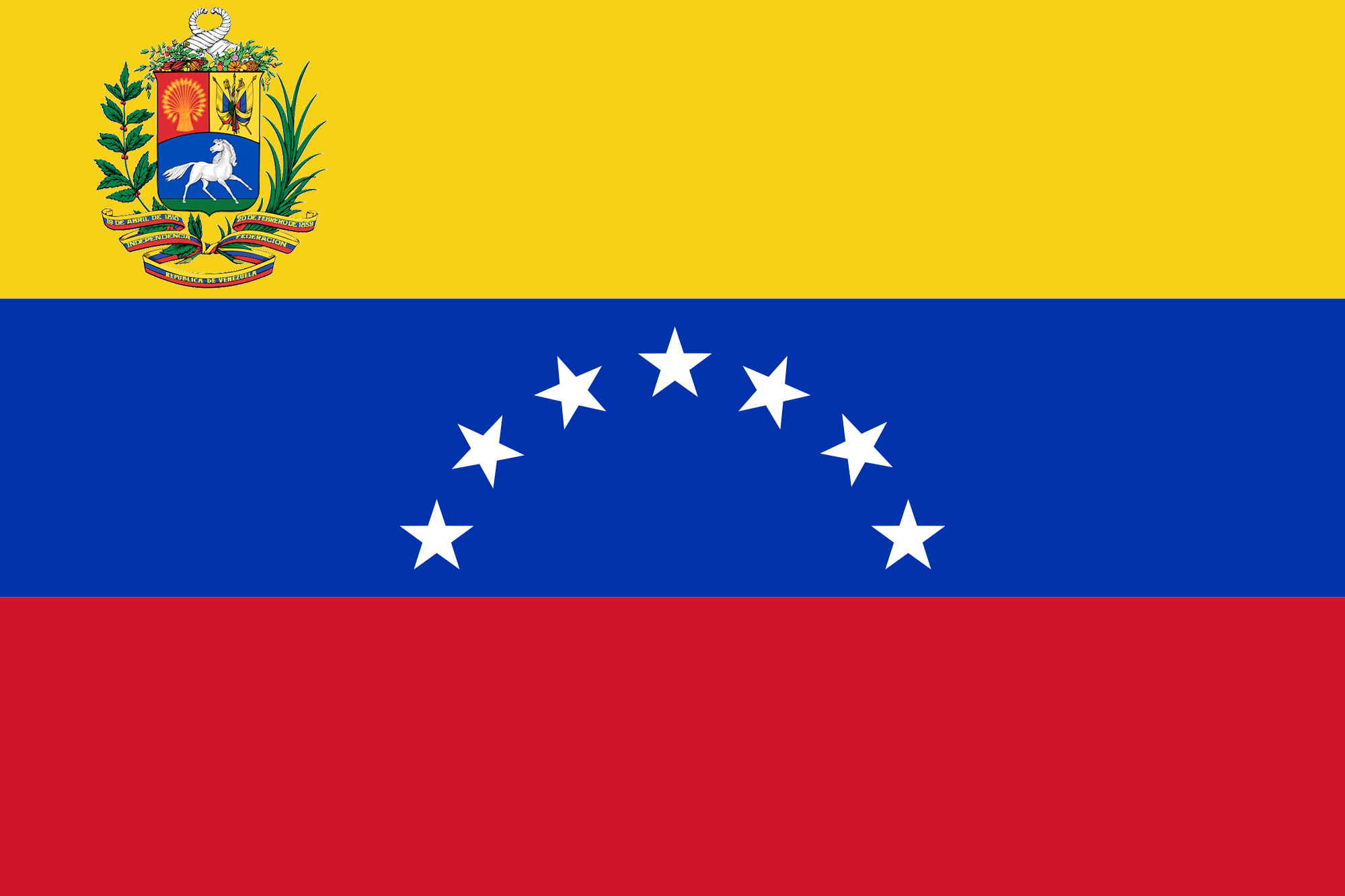
- IOC code: VEN
- NOC: Venezuelan Olympic Committee

in Rome
- Competitors: 36 in 9 sports
- Flag bearer: Héctor Thomas
- Medals Ranked 41st: Gold 0 Silver 0 Bronze 1 Total 1

Summer Olympics appearances (overview)
- 1948; 1952; 1956; 1960; 1964; 1968; 1972; 1976; 1980; 1984; 1988; 1992; 1996; 2000; 2004; 2008; 2012; 2016; 2020; 2024

Venezuela competed at the 1960 Summer Olympics held in Rome, Italy. 36 competitors, 31 men and 5 women, were selected by the Comité Olímpico Venezolano to take part in 26 events in 9 sports. The Venezuelan representation was similar to that of the Helsinki Games that awarded the country first olympic medal but including for the first time a Venezuelan sailing and weightlifting representation. The sporting shooter Enrico Forcella won the nation's second ever Olympic medal and to date solely Olympic medallist in shooting. Women's return after being absent from the previous game, competing in fencing like before but also for the first time in swimming.

== Medalists ==
=== Bronze ===
- Enrico Forcella — Shooting, Men's Small-Bore Rifle, Prone position, 50 metres

== Competitors ==
Sport	Men	Women	Total
Athletics	7	0	7
Boxing	3	0	3
Fencing	4	4	8
Cycling	5	0	5
Shooting	6	0	6
Swimming	0	1	1
Yachting	2	0	2
Weightlifting	2	0	2
Wrestling	2	0	2
Total	31	5	36

== Athletics ==
- Rafael Romero
- Clive Bonas
- Horacio Esteves
- Lloyd Murad
- Emilio Romero
- Héctor Thomas
- Víctor Maldonado

== Boxing ==
- Miguel Amarista
- Fidel Odremán
- Mario Romero

== Cycling ==
Five cyclists, all men, represented Venezuela in 1960.

Individual road race

- Arsenio Chirinos
- Emilio Vidal
- José Ferreira
- Francisco Mujica

Team time trial

- José Ferreira
- Francisco Mujica
- Arsenio Chirinos
- Víctor Chirinos

== Fencing ==
Eight fencers, four men and four women, represented Venezuela in 1960.

Men's foil

- Jesús Gruber
- Freddy Quintero
- Luis García

Men's team foil

- Luis García, Freddy Quintero, Augusto Gutiérrez, Jesús Gruber

Men's sabre

- Augusto Gutiérrez
- Luis García

Women's foil

- Belkis Leal
- Norma Santini
- Ingrid Sander

Women's team foil

- Ingrid Sander, Norma Santini, Belkis Leal, Teófila Márquiz

== Sailing ==
- Daniel Camejo Octavio
- Peter Camejo Guanche

== Shooting ==
Six shooters represented Venezuela in 1960. Enrico Forcella won the bronze in the 50m rifle, prone event.

25 m pistol

- Carlos Crassus
- Carlos Monteverde

50 m rifle, prone

- Enrico Forcella
- José Cazorla

Trap

- Bram Zanella
- Franco Bonato

== Swimming ==
Women

Athlete	Event	Heat		Semifinal		Final	
Athlete	Event	Time	Rank	Time	Rank	Time	Rank
Anneliese Rockenbach	100 m freestyle	1:08.5	29	Did not advance			
Anneliese Rockenbach	100 m backstroke	1:18.6	24	—N/a		Did not advance	

== Weightlifting ==
- Oswaldo Solórzano
- Enrique Guitens

== Wrestling ==
- Rafael Durán
- César Ferreras
