= Heidi Schmid =

German fencer (born 1938)

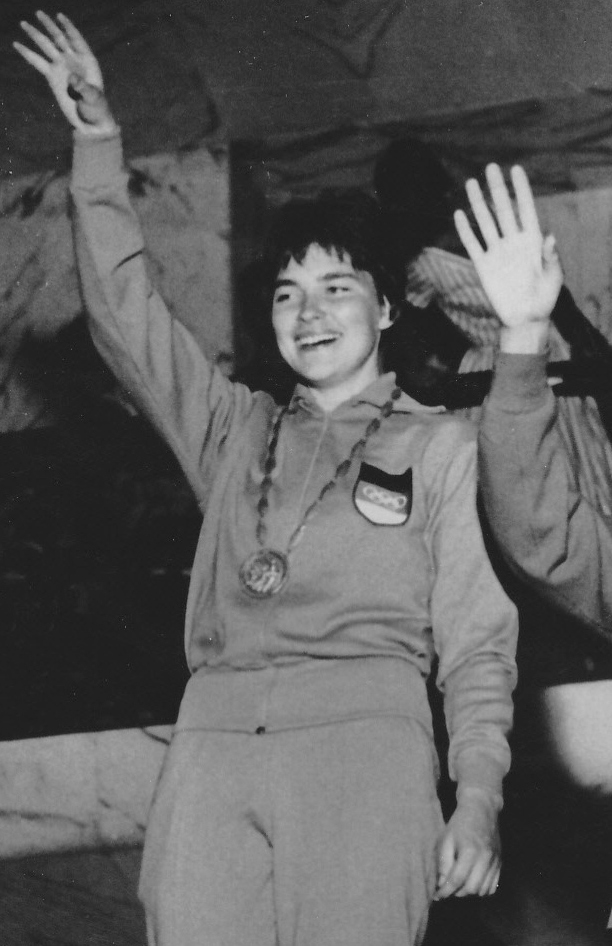
- Schmid at the 1960 Olympics

Personal information
- Born: 5 December 1938 (age 87) Klagenfurt, Nazi Germany (present-day Austria)
- Height: 1.66 m (5 ft 5 in)
- Weight: 63 kg (139 lb)

Sport
- Sport: Fencing
- Club: TSV Schwaben Augsburg
Medal record
Representing Germany
Olympic Games
Gold medal – first place	1960 Rome	Individual foil
Bronze medal – third place	1964 Tokyo	Team foil
World Fencing Championships
Silver medal – second place	1957 Paris	Team foil
Silver medal – second place	1957 Paris	Individual foil
Silver medal – second place	1958 Philadelphia	Team foil
Bronze medal – third place	1959 Budapest	Team foil
Gold medal – first place	1961 Turin	Foil individual
Summer Universiade
Gold medal – first place	1961 Sofia	Individual foil
Bronze medal – third place	1961 Sofia	Team foil
Bronze medal – third place	1965 Budapest	Individual foil

Adelheid "Heidi" Schmid (German pronunciation: [̯ˈhaɪdiː ˈʃmɪt]; after marriage Grundmann-Schmid, born 5 December 1938) is a retired German fencer who competed at the 1960, 1964 and 1968 Olympics in the individual and team foil events. She won an individual gold in 1960 and a team bronze medal in 1964.

== Career ==
Schmid took fencing when she was 13 years old. One year later, 14 years old, she finished third in the German youth championships. She became female German champion in foil fencing in 1957, 1959, 1964, 1965, 1966, 1967 and 1968.

On 1 September 1960 Heidi Schmid won the Olympic gold medal in Palazzo dei Congressi in Rome, after defeating Maria Vicol from Romania with a 4:3 score. Four years later, she was part of the German team (Gudrun Theuerkauff, Heidi Schmid, Rosemarie Scherberger and Helga Mees) that received a bronze medal in the team competition. The team qualified from pool C, defeated France in the quarterfinal, lost to the Hungarian team in the semifinal, and defeated Italy in the bronze final.

In 1961 Schmid became the world champion and also student world champion in foil, and was selected German sportswoman of the year. In addition, she won an individual silver medal at the 1957 world championships, and two team silver medals.

== Later life ==
After retiring from competitions Schmid worked as a music teacher. She married a fellow teacher Hans Grundmann.

== Awards ==
- Silbernes Lorbeerblatt 1960 ('Silver Laurel Leaf', the highest sports award in Germany).
- German sportswoman of the year 1961.
- Honorary member of her home club TSV Schwaben Augsburg from 1995.

Awards
Preceded by (Germany) Ingrid Krämer	German Sportswoman of the Year; 1961	Succeeded by (Germany) Jutta Heine
