= Judy Goodrich =

Judy Goodrich may refer to:

- Judy Goodrich (fencer)
- Judy Goodrich (Paralympian)
