= José Ferreira =

José Ferreira may refer to:

- José Ferreira (cyclist) (born 1934), Venezuelan cyclist
- José Ferreira (fencer) (1923–2013), Portuguese fencer
- José Maria Ferreira (1899–1973), Portuguese shooter
- José Fernando Ferreira (born 1999), Brazilian decathlete
