= Margaret Stafford (disambiguation) =

Margaret Stafford may refer to:

- Margaret Basset, Baroness Stafford (13th century), wife of Edmund Stafford, 1st Baron Stafford
- Margaret de Audley, Countess of Stafford (1318–1349)
- Margaret de Stafford, Baroness Neville de Raby (1364–1396) wife of Ralph Neville, 1st Earl of Westmorland
- Margaret Beaufort, Countess of Stafford (1437–1474)
- Lady Margaret Beaufort (1441–1509; "Mary Stafford" 1458–1471) wife of Sir Henry Stafford; the King-mother of Henry VII of England
- Margaret Grey, Countess of Wiltshire (15th century; "Mary Stafford" 1494–1500) wife of Edward Stafford, 2nd Earl of Wiltshire
- Margaret Stafford (15th century) mother of John de Vere, 14th Earl of Oxford
- Margaret Fogge Stafford (16th century) mother of William Stafford (courtier)
- Margaret Stafford Cheyne Bulmer (died 1537) daughter of Edward Stafford, 3rd Duke of Buckingham, wife of Sir John Bulmer of the Bulmer family; she was burned at the stake for the Bigod's rebellion
- Margaret Corbet Stafford (17th century) wife of William Stafford (MP)
- Margaret Stafford (18th century) wife of Theophilus Blakeney
- Margaret Stafford (born 1931), British fencer
- Margaret Stafford (late 20th century) mother of Matthew Stafford
