= Lagerwall =

Lagerwall is a surname. Notable people with the surname include:

- Christina Lagerwall (born 1939), Swedish fencer
- Guje Lagerwall (1918–2019), Swedish actress
- Hans Lagerwall (1941–2022), Swedish fencer
- Sture Lagerwall (1908–1964), Swedish actor and film director
- Walborg Lagerwall (1851–1940), Swedish cellist
