= Diving at the 1960 Summer Olympics – Women's 3 metre springboard =

Women's 3 metre springboard at the Games of the XVII Olympiad
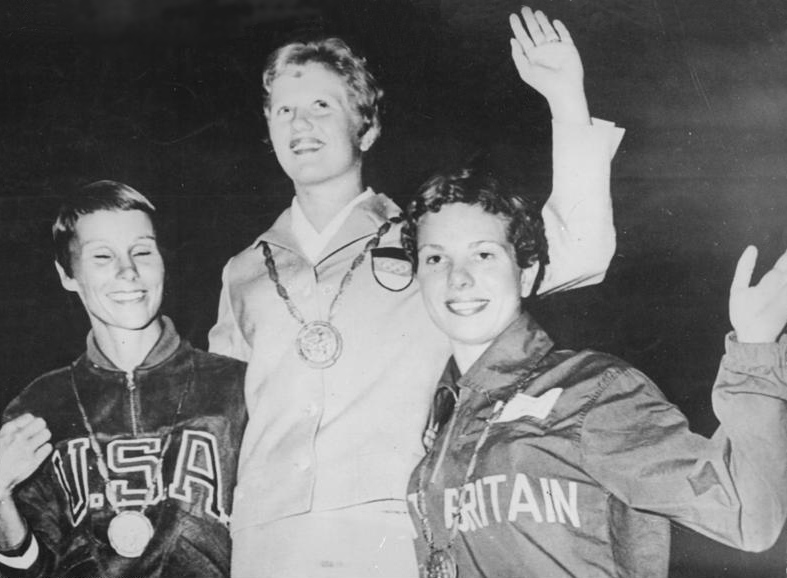
- Medallists Myers-Pope, Krämer, and Ferris

Medalists
1st place, gold medalist(s)		Ingrid Krämer	United Team of Germany
2nd place, silver medalist(s)		Paula Jean Myers-Pope	United States
3rd place, bronze medalist(s)		Elizabeth Ferris	Great Britain

The women's 3 metre springboard, also reported as 3-metre springboard diving, was one of four diving events on the Diving at the 1960 Summer Olympics programme.

The competition was split into three phases:

1. Preliminary round (26 August)
  Divers performed four voluntary dives without limit of degrees of difficulty. The sixteen divers with the highest scores advanced to the semi-finals.
2. Semi-final (27 August)
  Divers performed three voluntary dives without limit of degrees of difficulty. The eight divers with the highest combined scores from the preliminary round and semi-final advanced to the final.
3. Final (27 August)
  Divers performed three voluntary dives without limit of degrees of difficulty. The final ranking was determined by the combined score from all three rounds.

== Results ==
Rank	Diver	Nation	Preliminary		Semi-final				Final		
Rank	Diver	Nation	Points	Rank	Points	Rank	Total	Rank	Points	Rank	Total
1st place, gold medalist(s)	Ingrid Krämer	United Team of Germany	56.23	1	42.37	1	98.60	1	57.21	1	155.81
2nd place, silver medalist(s)	Paula Jean Myers-Pope	United States	52.67	2	37.35	6	90.02	4	51.22	2	141.24
3rd place, bronze medalist(s)	Elizabeth Ferris	Great Britain	52.37	3	37.09	7	89.46	5	46.63	4	139.09
4	Patsy Willard	United States	50.64	8	38.14	4	88.78	7	49.04	3	137.82
5	Ninel Krutova	Soviet Union	52.35	4	39.84	3	92.19	2	43.92	5	136.11
6	Irene MacDonald	Canada	50.42	9	40.81	2	91.23	3	43.46	6	134.69
7	Ann Long	Great Britain	50.87	7	36.31	10	87.18	8	42.45	7	129.63
8	Dorothea du Pon	Netherlands	51.20	6	37.61	5	88.81	6	34.54	8	123.35
9	Nicolle Darrigrand	France	48.96	10	36.76	9	85.72	9	did not advance		
10	Waldtraut Oertel	United Team of Germany	48.64	11	35.85	13	84.49	10	did not advance		
11	Yelena Kosolapova	Soviet Union	47.88	12	36.13	12	84.01	11	did not advance		
12	Susan Knight	Australia	46.19	14	37.06	8	83.25	12	did not advance		
13	Alexandra Morgenrood	Rhodesia	47.12	13	34.95	14	82.07	13	did not advance		
14	Kumiko Watanabe	Japan	44.32	16	36.25	11	80.57	14	did not advance		
15	Greta Lugthart	Netherlands	46.03	15	34.36	15	80.39	15	did not advance		
16	Kanoko Tsutani	Japan	51.95	5	28.42	16	80.37	16	did not advance		
17	Maria Teresa Adames	Mexico	42.00	17	did not advance						
18	Cristina Hardekopf	Argentina	41.87	18	did not advance						
