= Alexandra Morgenrood =

Zimbabwean diver (born 1940)

Personal information
- Nationality: Zimbabwean
- Born: 13 August 1940 (age 84); Harare, Rhodesia

Sport
- Sport: Diving

Alexandra Morgenrood (born 13 August 1940) is a Zimbabwean diver. She competed in the women's 3 metre springboard event at the 1960 Summer Olympics for the Federation of Rhodesia and Nyasaland.
