= Evelyn Terhune =

American fencer (1932–1981)

Personal information
- Born: July 21, 1932 Jersey City, New Jersey, United States
- Died: June 8, 1981 (aged 48) Columbus, Ohio, United States

Sport
- Sport: Fencing

Evelyn Florence Terhune (July 21, 1932 – June 8, 1981) was an American foil fencer and fencing coach who competed in the women's individual and team foil events at the 1960 Summer Olympics and was the long-time head coach of the women's fencing team at Fairleigh Dickinson University (FDU).

Terhune was a 1954 graduate of the FDU campus in Rutherford, New Jersey, where she took up fencing after being dared by a fellow student. Her second-place finish at the Amateur Fencers League of America tournament in 1960 earned her a spot on the team representing the U.S. at the 1960 Summer Olympics in Rome, where she competed in the women's foil individual event and the first ever Olympic women's team event.

She returned to her alma mater to coach the women's fencing team and was named as FDU's vice president of development in 1973. As the fencing coach at FDU from 1958 through 1974, her teams never had a losing season. Having often dedicated 12 hours, or more, per day as a coach while the team was in season, she had been advised to relinquish her position as fencing coach after accepting the new administrative position, but she felt that "it is not easy to give up something which you have been dedicated to for that long." She coached her teams to three team championships at the National Intercollegiate Women's Fencing Association tournament, in 1960, 1963 and again in 1969, and coached two team members to individual NIWFA foil championships.

As a member of the United States Olympic Fencing Games Committee, Terhune was part of the group responsible for selection of the individuals who would represent the nation at the 1976 Summer Olympics that were to be held in Montreal. She claimed that the United States had never to that point put a gold medalist in fencing up on the awards podium at an Olympic games because "American fencers just haven't been willing to pay the price for a medal", citing the need for fencers to take on up to six hours per day of practice in order to achieve the proficiency needed to compete successfully at the international level.

The foil team champion at the National Intercollegiate Women's Fencing Association's Christmas Invitational Tournament is awarded the Evelyn "Terry" Terhune Trophy, which was donated in her memory by Betty Santelli in 1981.

She was inducted into the Division I Athletics Hall of Fame at Fairleigh Dickinson University as part of its inaugural induction class of 1999.

Terhune had been a resident of Mahwah, New Jersey.
