= Claudia Pasini =

Italian fencer (1939–2015)

Personal information
- Born: 2 March 1939 Trieste, Italy
- Died: 23 September 2015 (aged 76) Trieste, Italy

Sport
- Sport: Fencing
Medal record
Representing Italy
Olympic Games
Bronze medal – third place	1960 Rome	Team foil
Summer Universiade
Bronze medal – third place	1959 Turin	Team foil

Claudia Marcella Maria Rita Pasini (2 March 1939 – 23 September 2015) was an Italian fencer. She won a bronze medal in the women's team foil event at the 1960 Summer Olympics.
