= Yelena Kosolapova =

Soviet diver

Personal information
- Nationality: Soviet
- Born: 12 March 1937 (age 88)

Sport
- Sport: Diving

Yelena Kosolapova (born 12 March 1937) is a Soviet diver. She competed in the women's 3 metre springboard event at the 1960 Summer Olympics.
