= Fencing at the 1959 Summer Universiade =

Fencing events were contested at the 1959 Summer Universiade in Turin, Italy.

== Medal overview ==
The medals were as follows:

=== Men's events ===
Event	Gold	Silver	Bronze
Individual foil	Guy Barrabino (FRA)	Yury Sisikin (URS)	Viktor Zhdanovich (URS)
Team foil	Soviet Union (URS); Yury Sisikin; Iuri Osip'ovi; Viktor Zhdanovich; Yevgeny Ryumin	Hungary (HUN); Ferenc Czvikovszky; Jenő Kamuti; József Marosi; Bertalan Szőcs	France (FRA); Pierre Rodocanachi; Guy Barrabino; Ceretti; Vincent
Individual épée	István Kausz (HUN)	Michel Steininger (SUI)	Göran Abrahamsson (SWE)
Team épée	Italy (ITA); Guido Cipriani; Alberto Pellegrino; Gianluigi Saccaro; Pietro Tassinari	Poland (POL); Wiesław Glos; Bogdan Gonsior; Włodzimierz Strzyżewski; Jerzy Wojciechowski	Hungary (HUN); István Kausz; József Marosi; Pál Rabár; Tibor Szûcs
Individual sabre	Wladimiro Calarese (ITA)	Emil Ochyra (POL)	Jean-Ernest Ramez (FRA)
Team sabre	Hungary (HUN); Attila Kovács; Tamás Mendelényi; Tibor Pézsa; József Szerencsés	Italy (ITA); Wladimiro Calarese; Mario Ravagnan; Guido Benvenuti; Michele Reese	Poland (POL); Bronisław Borowski; Ryszard Parulski; Emil Ochyra; Eugeniusz Kaźmierski

=== Women's events ===
Event	Gold	Silver	Bronze
Individual foil	Rosemarie Weiß (FRG)	Gudrun Vorbrich (FRG)	Monique Leroux (FRA)
Team foil	France (FRA); Monique Leroux; Florence Roussy; Cuvelier; Mireille Schamanech	West Germany (FRG); Gudrun Vorbrich; Rosemarie Weiß; Ursula Michels; Dörner	Italy (ITA); Claudia Pasini; Cristiana Bortolotti; Leopolda Predaroli; Vera Mantovani

== Medal table ==
Rank	Nation	Gold	Silver	Bronze	Total
1	Hungary (HUN)	2	1	1	4
1	Italy (ITA)	2	1	1	4
3	France (FRA)	2	0	3	5
4	West Germany (FRG)	1	2	0	3
5	Soviet Union (URS)	1	1	1	3
6	Poland (POL)	0	2	1	3
7	Switzerland (SUI)	0	1	0	1
8	Sweden (SWE)	0	0	1	1
Totals (8 entries)		8	8	8	24
