= Pilar Roldán =

Mexican fencer (born 1939)

Personal information
- Born: María del Pilar Roldán Tapia; 18 November 1939 (age 86) Mexico City, Mexico

Sport
- Sport: Fencing
Medal record
Women's fencing
Representing Mexico
Olympic Games
Silver medal – second place	1968 Mexico City	Women's Foil

María del Pilar Roldán Tapia (born 18 November 1939 in Mexico City) is a Mexican former foil fencer and the first Mexican woman to win an olympic medal in the history of Olympic fencing. During the 1968 Mexican Olympic Games she was a silver medalist; she was a champion in singles. She competed for Mexico at the 1968 Summer Olympics held in Mexico City, Mexico, where she won the silver medal in the women's foil event.

== Family ==
Her parents were Ángel Roldán ("El Güero"), one of the best tennis players in the national field, selected for the Davis Cup (1934), and María Tapia ("La Chata"), a triple medalist in the Central American and Caribbean Games in El Salvador (1935).

== Early life ==
Pilar Roldán was born in Mexico City, Mexico. At a young age Pilar began playing tennis, but her passion for fencing was born, thanks to the work of Alejandro Dumas "the three musketeers". At first, she only played with a cape to pretend to be a musketeer, but for her third birthday (1952), Pilar asked her parents for fencing lessons. At the end of that year, the world renowned Italian Professor Eduardo Alajmo decided to move to Mexico, and Pilar was one of his first graduates. Recognizing the passion of his daughter, he decided to install a small fencing court in their house and buy her high quality protective masks, gloves, and a vest. And so that without realizing, the so-called "white sport" ceased to be the main focus of this tennis family.

At 15 years of old, Pilar was the undefeated national champion in foil fencing. On March 12, 1955, in Mexico, father and daughter (Ángel Roldán and Pilar Roldán) participated in fencing en the second Pan-American Games. This was an unprecedented feat, and since that day, no one father and daughter pair has ever competed for their country at the Pan-American Games. Neither won a medal, but Pilar had some victories in singles. She was defeated by the Venezuelan, Igrid Sanders, finishing in fourth place after defeating Maxime Mitchel.
