= Eugenia Mateianu =

Romanian fencer

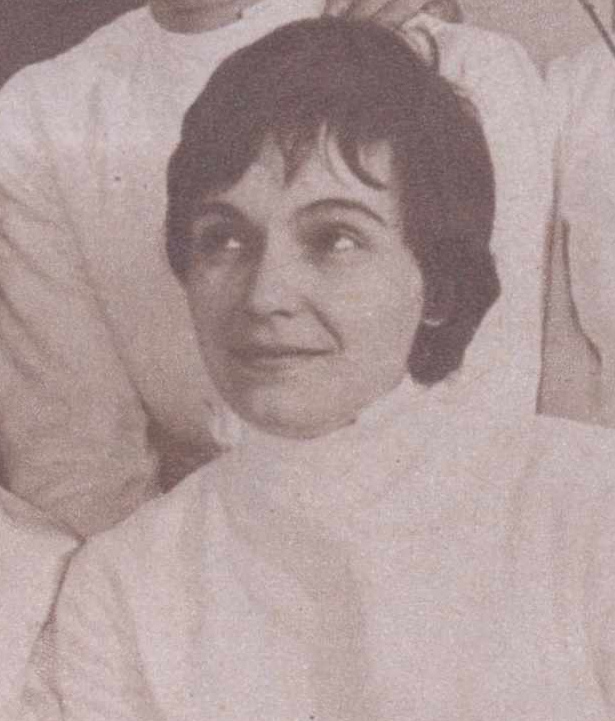
- Mateianu in 1963

Personal information
- Born: 8 April 1936 (age 90) Chişinău, Romania

Sport
- Sport: Fencing

Eugenia Mateianu (born 8 April 1936) is a Romanian fencer. She competed in the women's team foil event at the 1960 Summer Olympics.
