= Gerrit Korteweg =

Dutch swimmer (1937–2022)

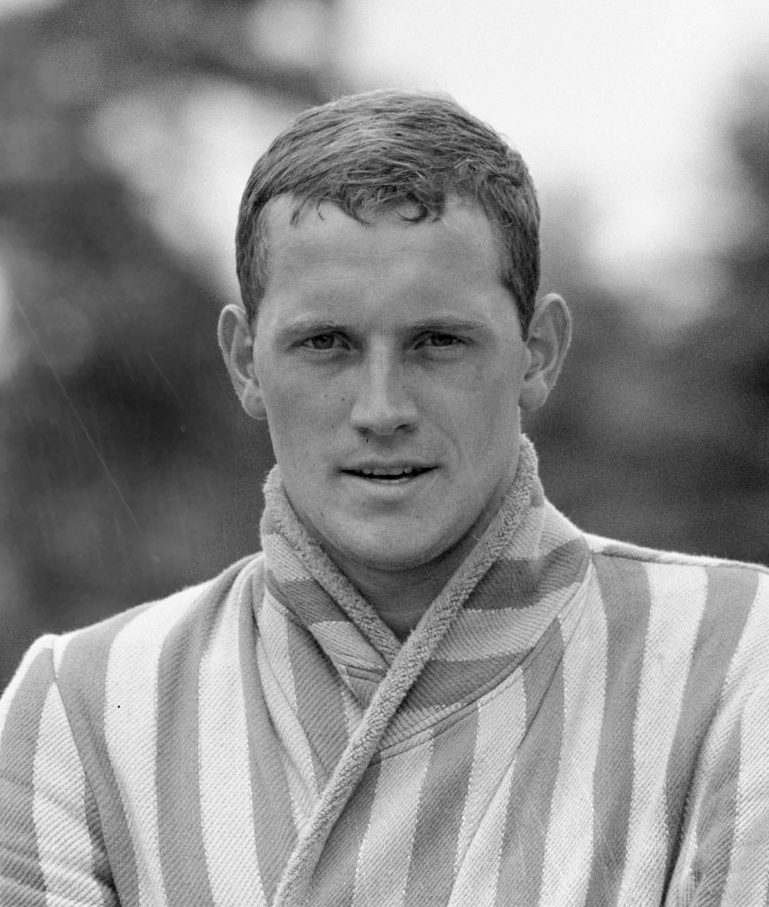
- Gerrit Korteweg in 1960

Personal information
- Born: August 17, 1937 Malang, Indonesia
- Died: 3 July 2022 (aged 84) Haren, Netherlands
- Height: 1.91 m (6 ft 3 in)
- Weight: 84 kg (185 lb)

Sport
- Sport: Swimming
- Club: DZV, Delft

Gerrit Jacobus Korteweg (17 August 1937 – 3 July 2022) was a retired Dutch swimmer. He competed at the 1960 Summer Olympics in and 4 × 100 m medley relay and finished eighth in the latter event. In the 200 m butterfly, he finished sixth.
