= Kate Baxter =

Australian fencer (1930–2019)

Personal information
- Born: Kathleen Baxter; 28 November 1930 Sydney, Australia
- Died: 23 March 2019 (aged 88)

Sport
- Sport: Fencing

Kate Baxter (28 November 1930 – 23 March 2019) was an Australian fencer. She competed in the women's individual foil event at the 1960 Summer Olympics.
