= Carmen Vall =

Spanish fencer (born 1926)

Personal information
- Born: 17 June 1926 (age 100) Barcelona, Spain

Sport
- Sport: Fencing

María del Carmen Vall Arquerons (born 17 June 1926) is a Spanish fencer. She competed in the women's individual foil event at the 1960 Summer Olympics.
