= Shirley Armstrong =

Irish fencer (1930–2018)

Shirley Armstrong-Duffy
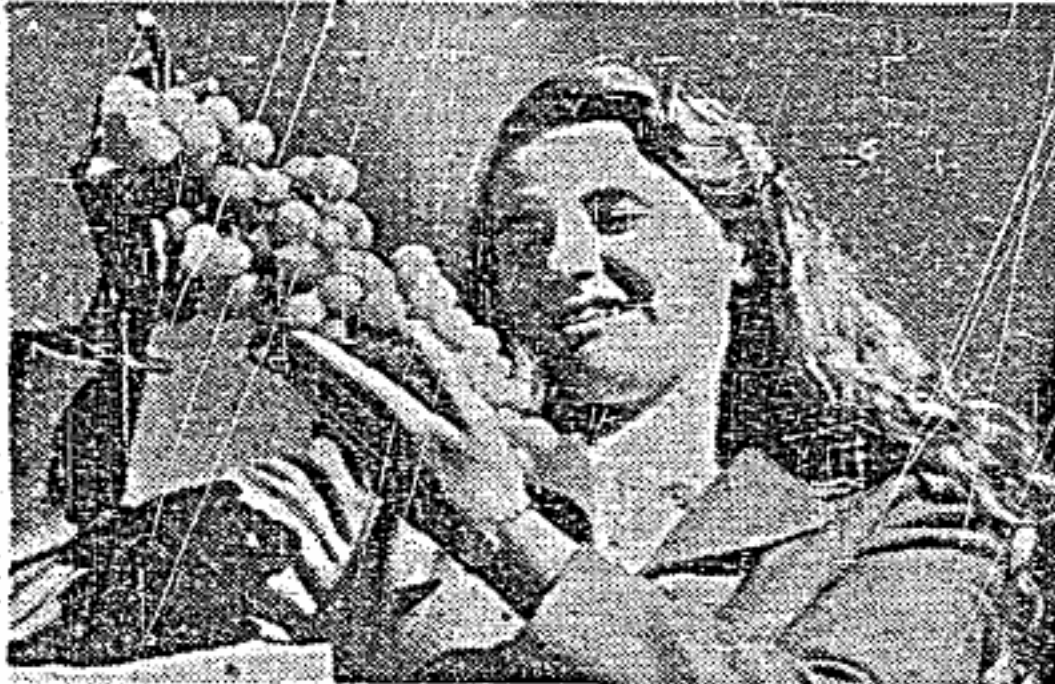

Personal information
- Born: 14 August 1930 Antrim, Northern Ireland
- Died: 21 December 2018 (aged 88)

Sport
- Sport: Fencing

Shirley Armstrong-Duffy (14 August 1930 – 21 December 2018) was an Irish fencer. She competed in the women's individual foil event at the 1960 Summer Olympics for the Republic of Ireland.

== Biography ==
Armstrong married Irish fencer, Patrick Joseph Duffy who founded The Irish Academy of Arms (Academie d'Armes d'Irlande) in 1952 as well as the highly successful club - Salle Duffy. They helped to build it into a club which dominated fencing in Ireland and became one of the premier clubs in the country. In 1958, they were both heavily involved in the re-establishment of the International Academy of Fencing Masters. Both coached in the fencing clubs at University College Dublin, Royal College of Surgeons and Trinity College Dublin. as well as St Conleth's College, St Killian's School, Wesley College, Sandford Park School, Sutton Park School, St Gerard's School and many other schools in Dublin.

For the 1960 Summer Olympics, Armstrong was one of only two women selected to represent Ireland; the second was Maeve Kyle. Armstrong won one bout in the women's individual foil, attaining fifth position in her round 1 pool.

Armstrong died on 21 December 2018, in Roscommon University Hospital.
