= Greta Lugthart =

Dutch diver (born 1934)

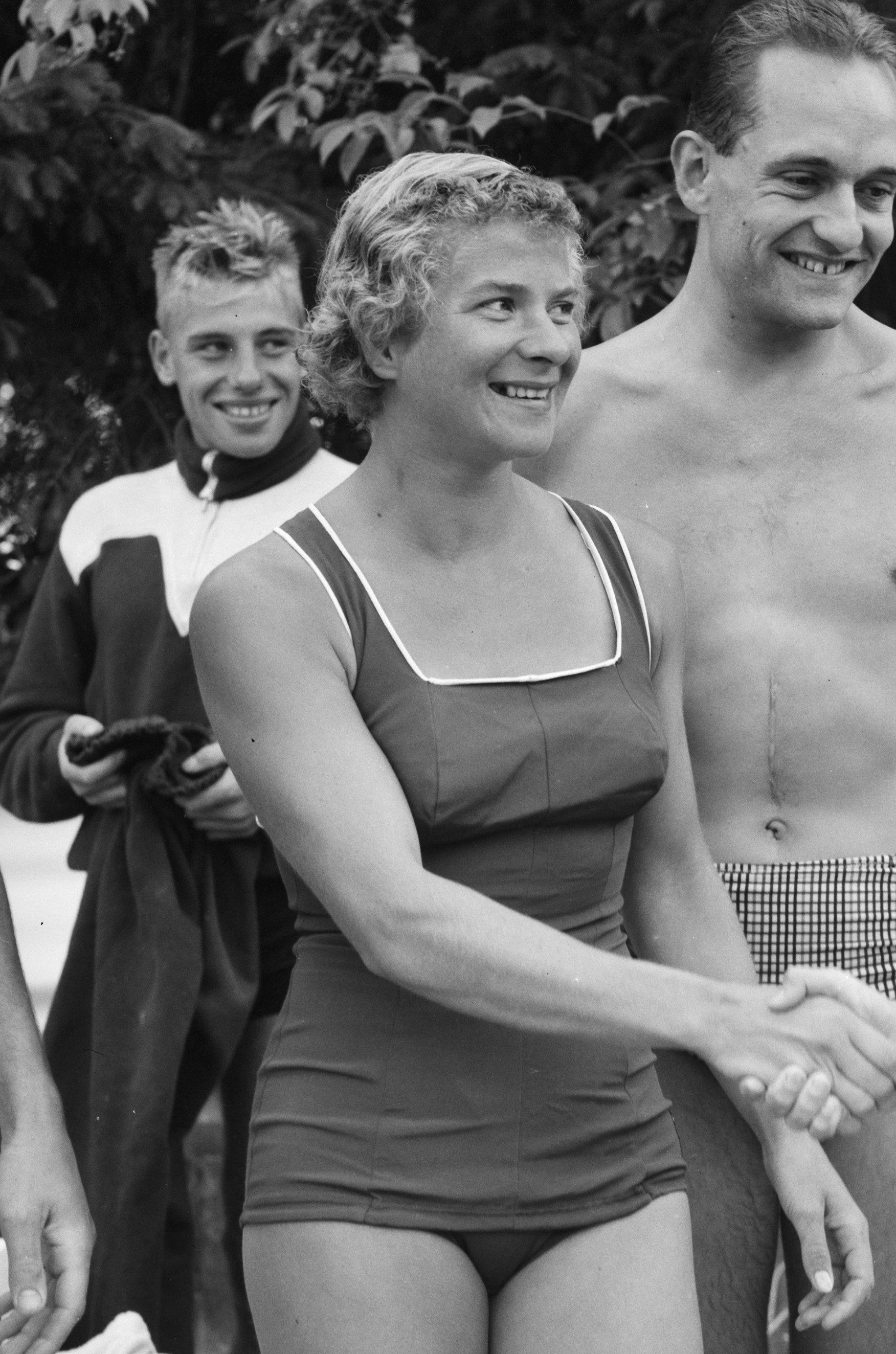
- Greta Lugthart after winning the 1959 Dutch Championships

Personal information
- Born: 11 December 1934 (age 91) Groningen, the Netherlands
- Height: 1.64 m (5 ft 5 in)
- Weight: 57 kg (126 lb)

Sport
- Sport: Diving
- Club: ZCG, Groningen

Greta "Greetje" Lugthart (born 11 December 1934) is a retired Dutch diver. She competed at the 1960 Summer Olympics in the 3 m springboard and finished in 15th place.
