= Vera Jeftimijades =

Yugoslav fencer (born 1937)

Personal information
- Born: 25 May 1937 (age 89) Belgrade, Kingdom of Yugoslavia

Sport
- Sport: Fencing
- Club: Crvena Zvezda
Medal record
Women's Fencing
Representing Yugoslavia
Mediterranean Games
Bronze medal – third place	1971 Izmir	Foil

Vera Jeftimijades (born 25 May 1937) is a Yugoslav fencer. She competed in the women's individual foil event at the 1960 Summer Olympics. She won a bronze medal at the 1971 Mediterranean Games in the individual foil event.
