= Marjatta Moulin =

Finnish fencer

Personal information
- Born: 23 November 1926; Mänttä, Finland
- Died: 6 November 2018 (aged 91)

Sport
- Sport: Fencing

Marjatta Moulin (née Heimolainen; 23 November 1926 – 6 November 2018) was a Finnish fencer. She competed in the women's individual foil event at the 1960 Summer Olympics.
