= Marie Melchers =

Belgian fencer

Personal information
- Born: 13 April 1939 (age 87) Etterbeek, Belgium

Sport
- Sport: Fencing

Marie Melchers (born 13 April 1939) is a Belgian fencer. She competed in the women's individual foil event at the 1960 Summer Olympics.
