= Claude Wallet =

Belgian fencer (born 1932)

Personal information
- Born: 20 August 1932 Etterbeek, Belgium
- Died: 16 September 2021 (aged 89)

Sport
- Sport: Fencing

Claude Wallet (20 August 1932 – 16 September 2021) was a Belgian fencer. She competed in the women's individual foil event at the 1960 Summer Olympics.
