= Pilar Tosat =

Spanish fencer

Personal information
- Born: 21 March 1931 Barcelona, Spain

Sport
- Sport: Fencing

Pilar Tosat (born 21 March 1931) is a Spanish fencer. She competed in the women's individual foil event at the 1960 Summer Olympics.
