= Barbara Helsingius =

Finnish fencer

Barbara Helsingius-Koski
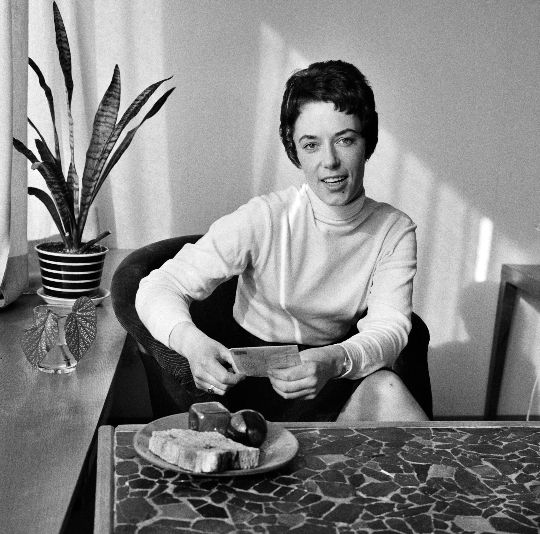
- 1965.

Personal information
- Born: Barbara Christina Elisabeth Helsingius; 27 September 1937 Helsinki, Finland
- Died: 9 March 2017 (aged 79) Espoo, Finland
- Spouse(s): Henry William Koski; 2 daughters

Sport
- Sport: Fencing

Barbara Christina Elisabeth Helsingius-Koski (née Helsingius; 27 September 1937 – 9 March 2017) was a Swedish-speaking Finnish singer, poet, and Olympic fencer.

== Career ==
She participated at the 1960 Summer Olympics in foil fencing. Trained as a gym teacher, she took her master's degree in pedagogy at Stanford University (1963). Interested in American art and folk music, she began to record, and her first release, Barbara (1966), was a collection of American folk songs, translated to Finnish.

She became well known internationally, and was a member of Visens venner in Norway, of Visans Vänner in Helsinki, and Yrkestrubadurernas Förening in Sweden, part of the Svenska visakademien (1999, as its only Finnish member), and the joint Nordic cultural organisation Nordvisa.

From 1968 to 1975, she lived in Oslo with her husband, Henry William "Hank" Koski, a diplomat at the U.S. embassy. She was the mother of two daughters. Her family lives in Espoo, Finland.

== Death ==
Helsingius died following a long illness on 9 March 2017 in Espoo, Finland at the age of 79.

== Prizes ==
- Hambestipendiet, Sweden (1989)
- Norsk-finsk kulturpris (1993)
- Nils Ferlin-prisen, (Sweden; 1994)
- Trubadurprisen (1994)
- NordVisa-statuetten ("Liv"; 1995)
- Pro Cultura, Espoo, Finland (1995)

== Books ==
- Vill du visor min vän? ISBN 9789515001726
- Kanske en visa (Schildts) ISBN 9789515004727
- Eino Leino, sångarens visa, poetry collection
- Songs Finland Sings, Warner/Chappel Music Finland (2000) OCLC 53063325

== Discography ==
- Barbara (1966; American folk songs in Finnish)
- Det var en gång (1977; own songs)
- Olipa kerran (1978; Finnish version of the above)
- Speiling (1981; Finnish songs in Norwegian)
- Barbaras blandade (1981; own songs)
- Kahlaajatyttö (1982; musical settings of the Finnish poets Aale Tynni and Aila Meriluoto)
- Fra Barbara med kjærlighet (1982; Finnish songs in Norwegian)
- Reflection. Songs from Finland (1984; Finnish songs in English)
- Drøm og bekjennelse (1986; her own and Finnish songs in Norwegian)
- Spegling (1986; Finnish-Swedish songs)
- Rakkaudella (1986; Finnish version of above)
- Tuulen niityillä (1992; Nordic songs in Finnish)
- Sånt är vårt liv (1996; own and Finnish songs in Swedish)
- Songs Finland Sings (2002; double CD of Finnish poems and songs, classics and songs which she translated to English. Contains 30 artists, including the Serena choir)
