= Gloria Colón =

Puerto Rican fencer

Personal information
- Born: 26 March 1931 Río Piedras, Puerto Rico
- Died: 17 September 2010 (aged 79) San Juan, Puerto Rico

Sport
- Sport: Fencing

Gloria Colón (26 March 1931 – 17 September 2010) was a Puerto Rican fencer. She competed in the women's individual foil event at the 1960 Summer Olympics. She was the first woman to represent Puerto Rico at the Olympics.
