= René Lotz =

Dutch cyclist

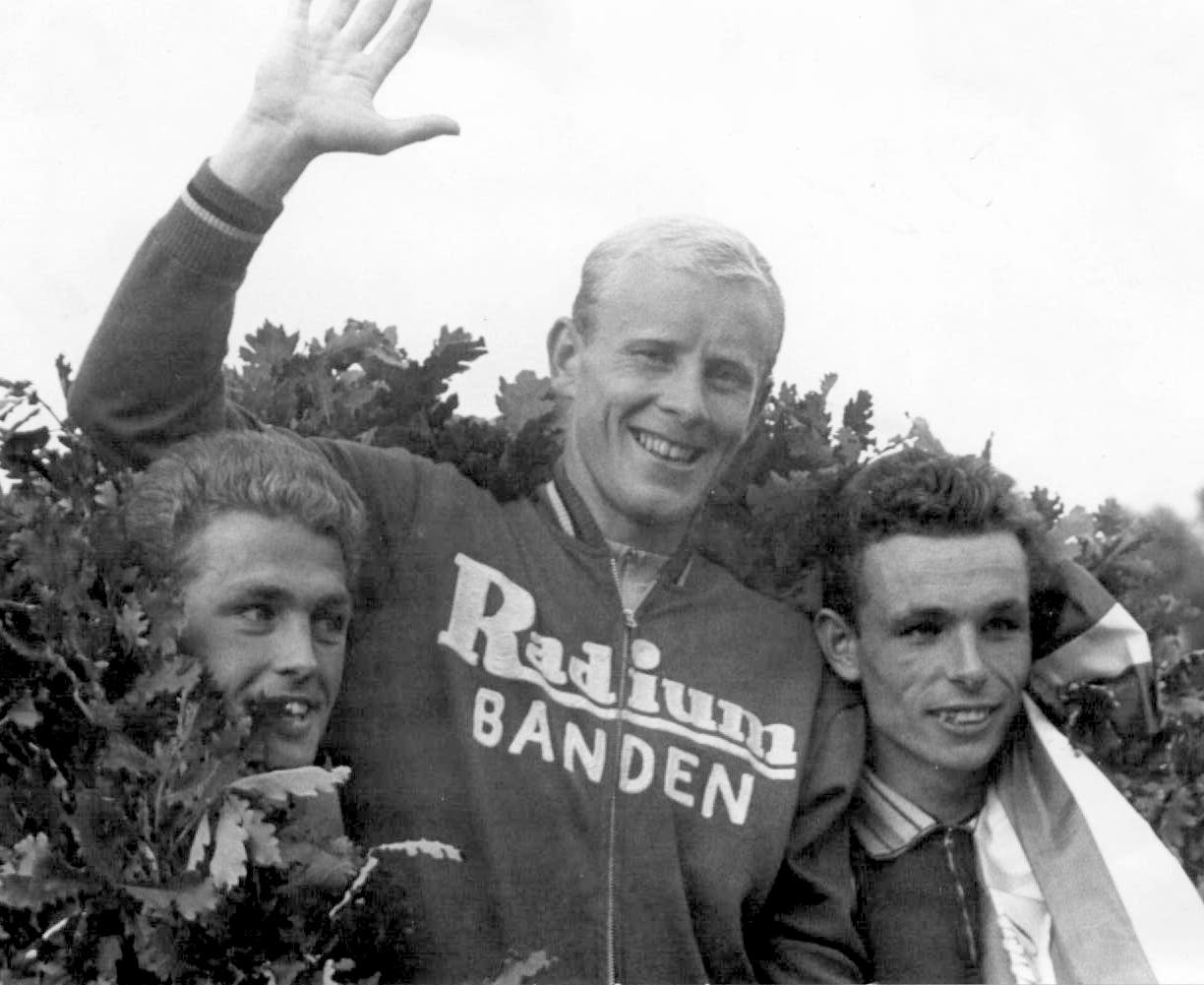
- René Lotz (center) on the podium of the 1960 Tour of Austria

Personal information
- Born: 18 April 1938 (age 88) Stein, Limburg, Netherlands
- Height: 1.84 m (6 ft 0 in)
- Weight: 79 kg (174 lb)

Sport
- Sport: Cycling

Cornelis Gerardus René Lotz (born 18 April 1938) is a retired Dutch cyclist who was active between 1957 and 1960. In 1960 he won the Tour of Austria and finished in fourth place in the 100 km team time trial at the 1960 Summer Olympics. He also competed in the individual road race at the 1960 Olympics.

== See also ==
- List of Dutch Olympic cyclists
