= Zuus Undapp =

Indonesian fencer (1934–2018)

Personal information
- Born: Elisabeth Adriana Alida Poerawinata; 3 April 1934 Manado, Indonesia
- Died: 1 June 2018 (aged 84)

Sport
- Sport: Fencing

Elisabeth Adriana Alida Poerawinata (3 April 1934 – 1 June 2018) was an Indonesian fencer who competed under the alias Zuus Undapp or Zus Undapp. She competed in the women's individual foil event at the 1960 Summer Olympics, where she lost all three of her bouts. She was considered one of the first prominent female fencers in Indonesia and won medals at numerous regional competitions, including a gold medal at the 1963 GANEFO tournament.
