= Lex van Kreuningen =

Dutch cyclist

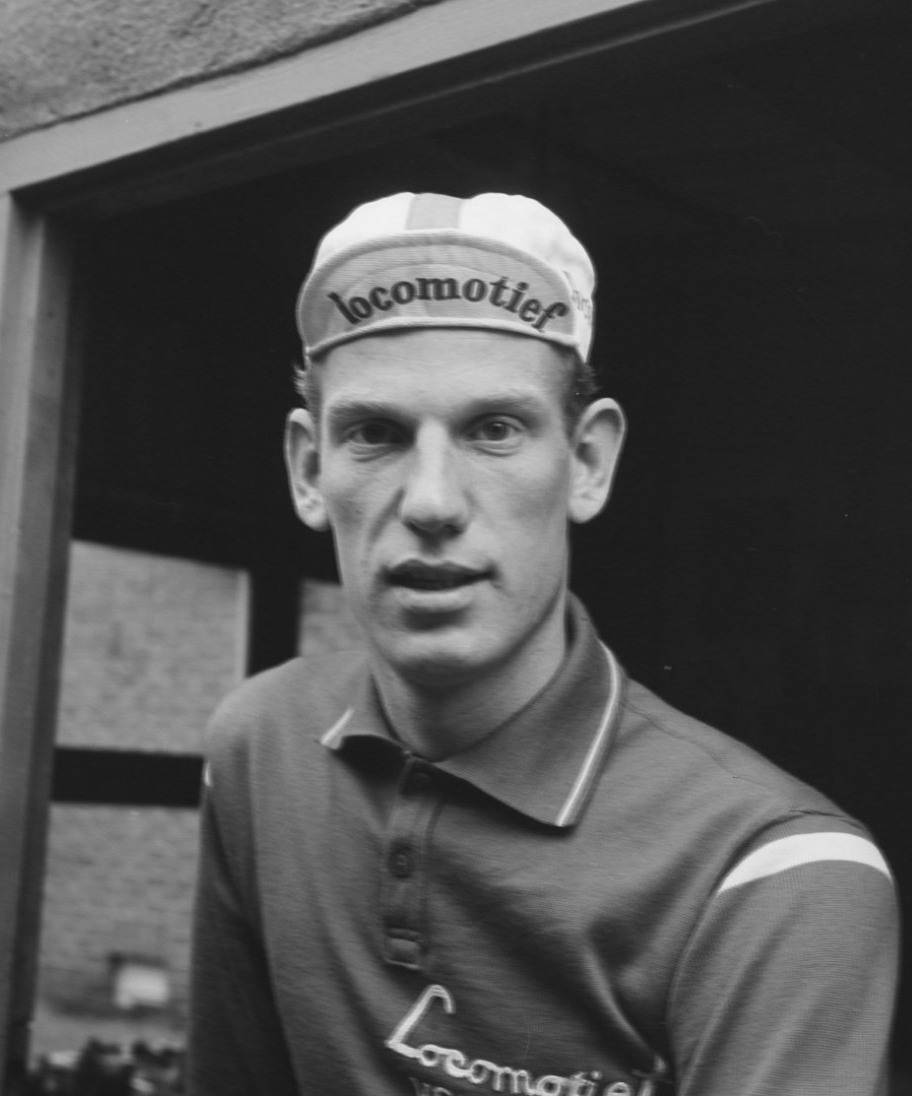
- Lex van Kreuningen in 1963

Personal information
- Born: 29 September 1937 (age 88) Utrecht, the Netherlands
- Height: 1.87 m (6 ft 2 in)
- Weight: 82 kg (181 lb)

Sport
- Sport: Cycling

Pieter Alex 'Lex' van Kreuningen (born 29 September 1937) is a retired Dutch road cyclist who was active between 1959 and 1964. He competed in the 1960 Summer Olympics in the 100 km team time trial and individual road race, finishing in fourth place in the time trial. He also won the Ronde van Limburg (1960) and Ronde van Nederland (1963), as well as two stages of the Tour de l'Avenir (1962 and 1963).

== See also ==
- List of Dutch Olympic cyclists
