= Jacqueline Appart =

Belgian fencer

Personal information
- Born: 5 November 1931 Charleroi, Belgium

Sport
- Sport: Fencing

Jacqueline Appart (born 5 November 1931) is a Belgian fencer. She competed in the women's individual foil event at the 1960 Summer Olympics.
