= Francisco Mujica (cyclist) =

Venezuelan cyclist

Personal information
- Born: 20 February 1936 (age 90) Araure, Venezuela

Cycling career
- Sport: Cycling

Francisco Mujica (born 20 February 1936) is a former Venezuelan cyclist. He competed in the individual road race and team time trial events at the 1960 Summer Olympics.
