= Helga Stroh =

German fencer

Personal information
- Born: 4 March 1938 (age 88) Frankfurt, Germany

Sport
- Sport: Fencing

Helga Stroh (born 4 March 1938) is a German fencer. She represented the United Team of Germany at the 1960 Summer Olympics in the women's team foil event.
