= Genowefa Migas-Stawarz =

Polish fencer

Personal information
- Born: 18 January 1935 (age 91) Kraków, Poland

Sport
- Sport: Fencing

Genowefa Migas-Stawarz (born 18 January 1935) is a Polish fencer. She competed in the women's team foil event at the 1960 Summer Olympics.
