= María Shaw =

Spanish fencer

Personal information
- Born: 31 January 1939 (age 87) Córdoba, Spain

Sport
- Sport: Fencing

María Shaw (born 31 January 1939) is a Spanish fencer. She competed in the women's individual foil event at the 1960 Summer Olympics.
