= Maria Nápoles =

Portuguese fencer (1936–2024)

Personal information
- Born: 7 November 1936 Lourenço Marques, Portuguese Mozambique
- Died: 27 June 2024 (aged 87)

Sport
- Sport: Fencing

Maria Nápoles (7 November 1936 – 27 June 2024) was a Portuguese fencer. She competed in the women's individual foil event at the 1960 Summer Olympics.

Maria Nápoles died on 27 June 2024, at the age of 87.
