= Maria Grötzer =

Austrian fencer

Personal information
- Born: 2 May 1928 Vienna, Austria

Sport
- Sport: Fencing

Maria Grötzer (born 2 May 1928) is an Austrian fencer. She competed in the women's individual and team foil events at the 1960 Summer Olympics.
