= Helga Gnauer =

Austrian fencer (1929–1990)

Personal information
- Born: 9 October 1929 Vienna, Austria
- Died: 24 January 1990 (aged 60)

Sport
- Sport: Fencing

Helga Gnauer (9 October 1929 – 24 January 1990) was an Austrian fencer. She competed in the women's individual and team foil events at the 1960 Summer Olympics and the 1957 World Championship.
