= Christina Lagerwall =

Swedish fencer

Personal information
- Born: 8 April 1939 (age 87) Gothenburg, Sweden

Sport
- Sport: Fencing

Christina Lagerwall (born 8 April 1939) is a Swedish fencer. She competed in the women's individual foil event at the 1960 Summer Olympics.
