= Bruna Colombetti-Peroncini =

Italian fencer (1936–2008)

Bruna Colombetti
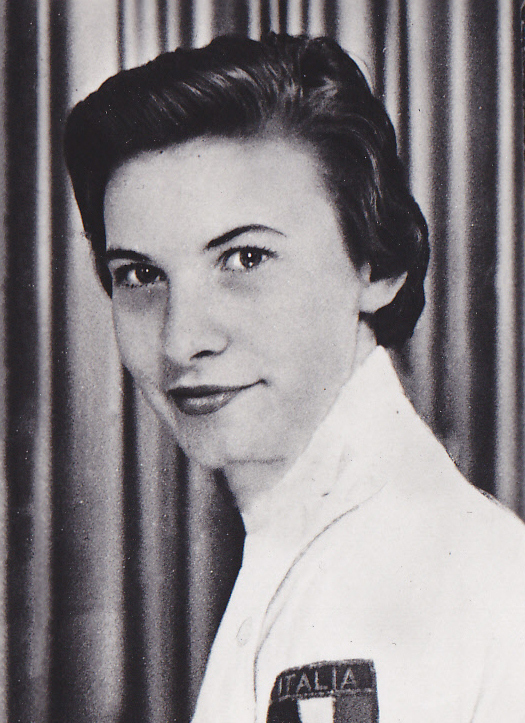

Personal information
- Full name: Bruna Colombetti-Peroncini
- Born: 27 January 1936 Milan, Italy
- Died: 26 July 2008 (aged 72) Milan, Italy
- Height: 1.73 m (5 ft 8 in)
- Weight: 75 kg (165 lb)

Sport
- Sport: Fencing
- Club: SS Cassa di Risparmio, Milan
Medal record
Representing Italy
Olympic Games
Bronze medal – third place	1960 Rome	Foil, team
World Championships
Bronze medal – third place	1953 Brussel	Foil, team
Silver medal – second place	1954 Luxemburg	Foil, team
Silver medal – second place	1955 Rome	Foil, individual
Bronze medal – third place	1955 Rome	Foil, team
Gold medal – first place	1957 Paris	Foil, team
Bronze medal – third place	1962 Buenos Aires	Foil, team
Bronze medal – third place	1963 Gdańsk	Foil, team
Bronze medal – third place	1965 Paris	Foil, team

Bruna Colombetti-Peroncini (27 January 1936 – 26 July 2008) was an Italian fencer. She competed at the 1956, 1960, 1964 and 1968 Olympics in the individual and team foil events and won a team bronze in 1960.

== Competitions ==
- 1956: 29/11/1956 - Olympic Games - Women's Foil: 8th place
- 1960: 03/09/1960 - Olympic Games - Women's Foil teams: 3rd place, Bronze Medal
- 1964: 15/10/1964 - Olympic Games - Women's Foil: 7th place
- 1964: 17/10/1964 - Olympic Games - Women's Foil teams: 4th place
- 1968: 24/10/1968 - Olympic Games - Women's Foil teams: 6th place
