= José Ferreira (cyclist) =

Venezuelan cyclist (born 1934)

Personal information
- Born: 19 May 1934 (age 92) Sanguedo, Venezuela

Cycling career
- Sport: Cycling

José Ferreira de Amorin (born 19 May 1934) is a Venezuelan former cyclist. He competed in the individual road race and team time trial events at the 1960 Summer Olympics.
