= Dorothea du Pon =

Dutch diver (born 1943)

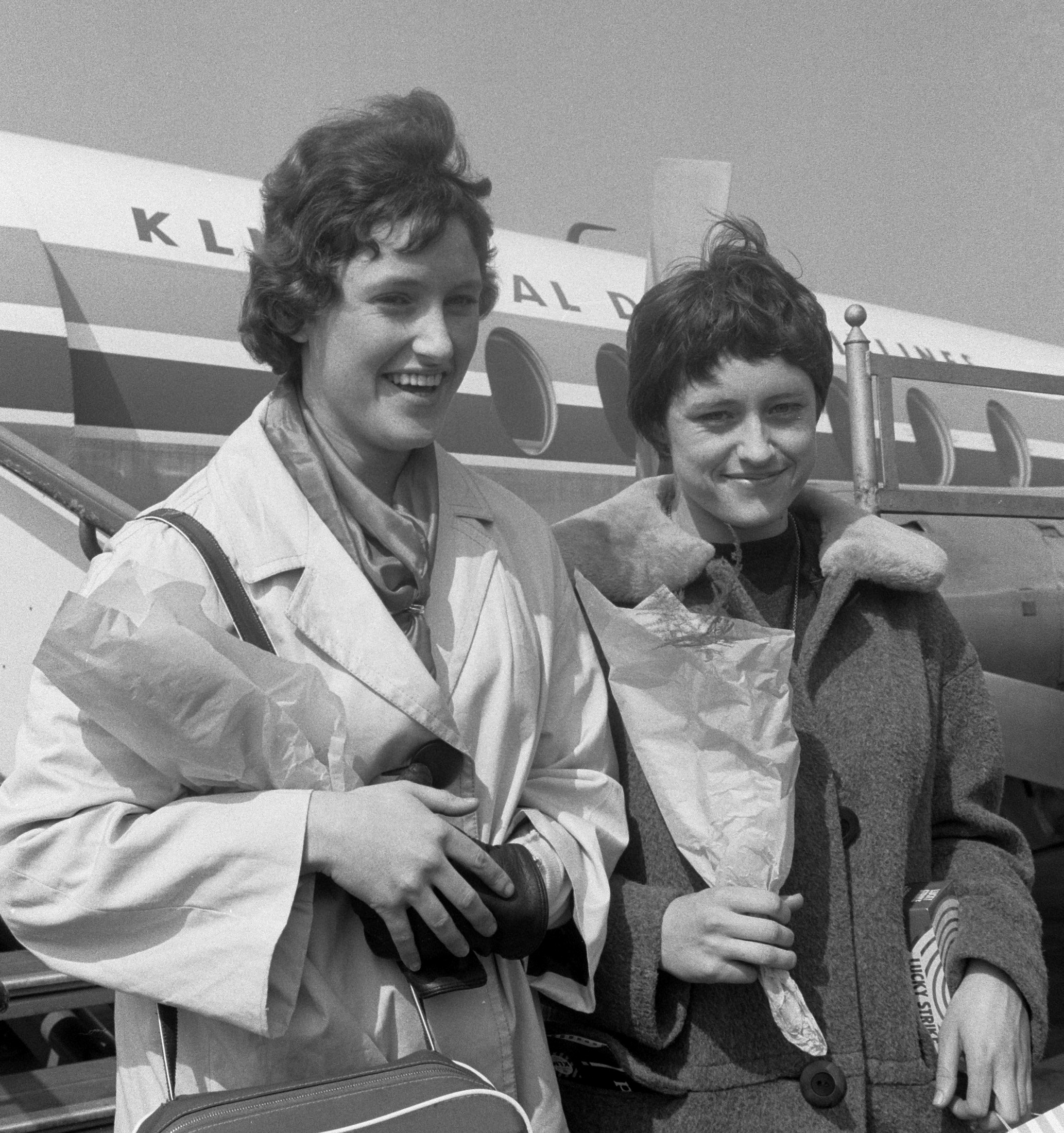
- Thea (left) and Judith du Pon in 1961

Personal information
- Born: 27 November 1943 (age 82) Renesse, the Netherlands
- Height: 1.66 m (5 ft 5 in)
- Weight: 58 kg (128 lb)

Sport
- Sport: Diving
- Club: Joop Stotijn, Den Haag

Dorothea Dirkje Jacoba "Thea" du Pon (later Sjoerdsma, born 27 November 1943) is a retired Dutch diver. She competed at the 1960 Summer Olympics in the 3 m springboard and finished in eighth place. She and her sister Judith were national springboard champions around 1960.
