= Gillian Sheen =

British fencer (1928–2021)

Gillian Sheen MBE
Personal information
- Nationality: British (English)
- Born: 21 August 1928 Willesden, London, England
- Died: 5 July 2021 (aged 92) Auburn, New York, US

Sport
- Sport: Fencing
Medal record
Women's fencing
Representing Great Britain
Olympic Games
Gold medal – first place	1956 Melbourne	Foil Individual
World Championships
Bronze medal – third place	1950 Monte Carlo	Team Foil
Representing England
British Empire & Commonwealth Games
Silver medal – second place	1954 Vancouver	Foil individual
Gold medal – first place	1958 Cardiff	Foil individual

Gillian Mary Donaldson MBE (née Sheen; 21 August 1928 – 5 July 2021) was a British fencer and Olympic champion in foil competition. She won a gold medal in the women's individual foil event at the 1956 Summer Olympics in Melbourne. She also competed at the 1952 and 1960 Summer Olympics.

== Fencing career ==
Sheen first took up the sport while studying at North Forland School in Kent, and won the schoolgirls title in 1945. In 1947, she took the Junior Championships and went to University College Hospital in London to become a dental surgeon. In 1949, she won her first senior national title and took the British Universities title for five consecutive years. In 1951, she won a gold medal at the World Universities Championships.

Sheen participated in the 1952 Summer Olympics but was eliminated in the second round. She went back to the Olympics in 1956 and took the gold medal for Great Britain. She won with a classic technique in a period when advancing athleticism was changing the sport. The press hailed her as a middle-class figure and emphasized her age (28) and gender so that she was seen as a "dark horse" competitor.

She participated at the 1950 World Fencing Championships in Monte Carlo, where she won a bronze medal in Team Foil with the British team. She represented England and won a silver medal in the individual foil at the 1954 British Empire and Commonwealth Games in Vancouver, Canada. Four years later she won the gold medal in the same event at the 1958 British Empire and Commonwealth Games in Cardiff. She competed until 1963, winning her tenth and final British Championship in 1960.

== Personal life ==
Sheen was born in Willesden in London on 21 August 1928. In 1962 she married Bob Donaldson, an American orthodontist, and moved to the United States. In 1966, she set up a dental and orthodontic practice with her husband in Auburn, NY, where she worked until her husband's death in 2004. She was appointed Member of the Order of the British Empire (MBE) in the 2019 Birthday Honours for services to UK sport.

== Death ==
Sheen died in Auburn, New York, on 5 July 2021, aged 92. She is survived by four children; her memorial service was held at the Episcopal Church of Saints Peter and John.

== Books ==
- Sheen, Gillian (1958). Instructions to Young Fencers. Museum Press. OCLC 1577370.
