= Monique Leroux =

French fencer

Personal information
- Born: 17 August 1938 Paris, France
- Died: 11 February 1985 (aged 46)

Sport
- Sport: Fencing
Medal record
Representing France
Summer Universiade
Gold medal – first place	1959 Turin	Team foil
Bronze medal – third place	1959 Turin	Individual foil

Monique Thérèse Jeanne Leroux (17 August 1938 – 11 February 1985) was a French fencer. She competed in the women's individual and team foil events at the 1960 Summer Olympics. She was born in Paris.
