= Sylwia Julito =

Polish fencer

Personal information
- Born: 28 March 1929 Świętochłowice, Poland
- Died: 14 December 2012 (aged 83) Germany

Sport
- Sport: Fencing

Sylwia Julito (28 March 1929 – 14 December 2012) was a Polish fencer. She competed in the women's individual and team foil events at the 1960 Summer Olympics.

She moved to Germany in 1983, where she died on 14 December 2012, at the age of 83.
