= Leni Kokkes-Hanepen =

Dutch fencer (born 1934)

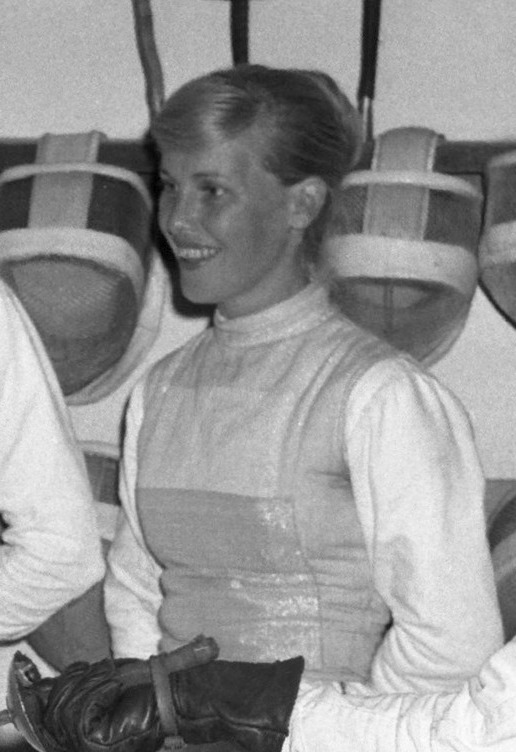
- Leni Kokkes-Hanepen in 1960

Personal information
- Born: 14 May 1934 (age 92) Amsterdam, Netherlands
- Height: 1.68 m (5 ft 6 in)
- Weight: 63 kg (139 lb)

Sport
- Sport: Fencing

Leni Kokkes-Hanepen (born 14 May 1934) is a retired Dutch fencer. She competed in the women's team foil event at the 1960 Summer Olympics.
