= Margaret Stafford =

British fencer

Personal information
- Born: 23 April 1931 (age 95) London, England

Sport
- Sport: Fencing

Margaret Stafford (born 23 April 1931) is a British fencer. She competed in the women's individual foil event at the 1960 Summer Olympics.
