= Gudrun Theuerkauff =

German fencer (born 1937)

Personal information
- Born: 8 April 1937 (age 89) Stettin, Nazi Germany (now Szczecin, Poland)

Sport
- Sport: Fencing
Medal record
Representing Germany
Olympic Games
Bronze medal – third place	1964 Tokyo	Team foil
Representing West Germany
Summer Universiade
Silver medal – second place	1959 Turin	Individual foil
Silver medal – second place	1959 Turin	Team foil

Gudrun Theuerkauff (née Vorbrich, born 8 April 1937) is a German fencer. She won a bronze medal in the women's team foil event at the 1964 Summer Olympics.
