= Traudl Ebert =

Austrian fencer

Personal information
- Born: 8 March 1936 (age 90) Klagenfurt, Austria

Sport
- Sport: Fencing

Traudl Ebert (born 8 March 1936) is an Austrian fencer. She competed in the women's individual and team foil events at the 1960 Summer Olympics.
