= Wanda Fukała-Kaczmarczyk =

Polish fencer (1935–2026)

Personal information
- Born: 2 September 1935 Katowice, Poland
- Died: 22 January 2026 (aged 90)

Sport
- Sport: Fencing

Wanda Fukała-Kaczmarczyk (2 September 1935 – 22 January 2026) was a Polish fencer. She competed in the women's individual and team foil events at the 1960 Summer Olympics and the team foil at the 1968 Games.
