= Teófila Márquiz =

Venezuelan fencer

Personal information
- Born: 5 March 1932 (age 94) Maiquetía, Venezuela

Sport
- Sport: Fencing

Teófila Márquiz (born 5 March 1932) is a Venezuelan fencer. She competed in the women's team foil event at the 1960 Summer Olympics.
