= Magdolna Nyári-Kovács =

Hungarian fencer (1921–2005)

Magda Nyári-Kovács
Personal information
- Full name: Magdolna Nyári-Kovács
- Born: 1 July 1921 Budapest, Hungary
- Died: 4 May 2005 (aged 83) Budapest, Hungary

Sport
- Sport: Fencing
Medal record
Women's fencing
Representing Hungary
Olympic Games
Silver medal – second place	1960 Rome	Team foil
World Championships
Bronze medal – third place	1951 Stockholm	Individual foil

Magdolna "Magda" Nyári-Kovács (1 July 1921 – 4 May 2005) was a Hungarian fencer. She won a silver medal in the women's team foil event at the 1960 Summer Olympics.
