= Elżbieta Pawlas =

Polish fencer

Personal information
- Born: 23 February 1934 (age 92) Gdynia, Poland

Sport
- Sport: Fencing

Elżbieta Pawlas (born 23 February 1934) is a Polish fencer. She competed at the 1960 and 1968 Summer Olympics.
