= Ingrid Sander =

Venezuelan fencer (born 1937)

Íngrid Sander
Personal information
- Born: 12 March 1937 (age 89) Caracas, Venezuela

Sport
- Sport: Fencing

Íngrid Sander (born 12 March 1937) is a Venezuelan fencer. She competed in the women's individual and team foil events at the 1960 Summer Olympics.
