= Elly Botbijl =

Dutch fencer (born 1940)

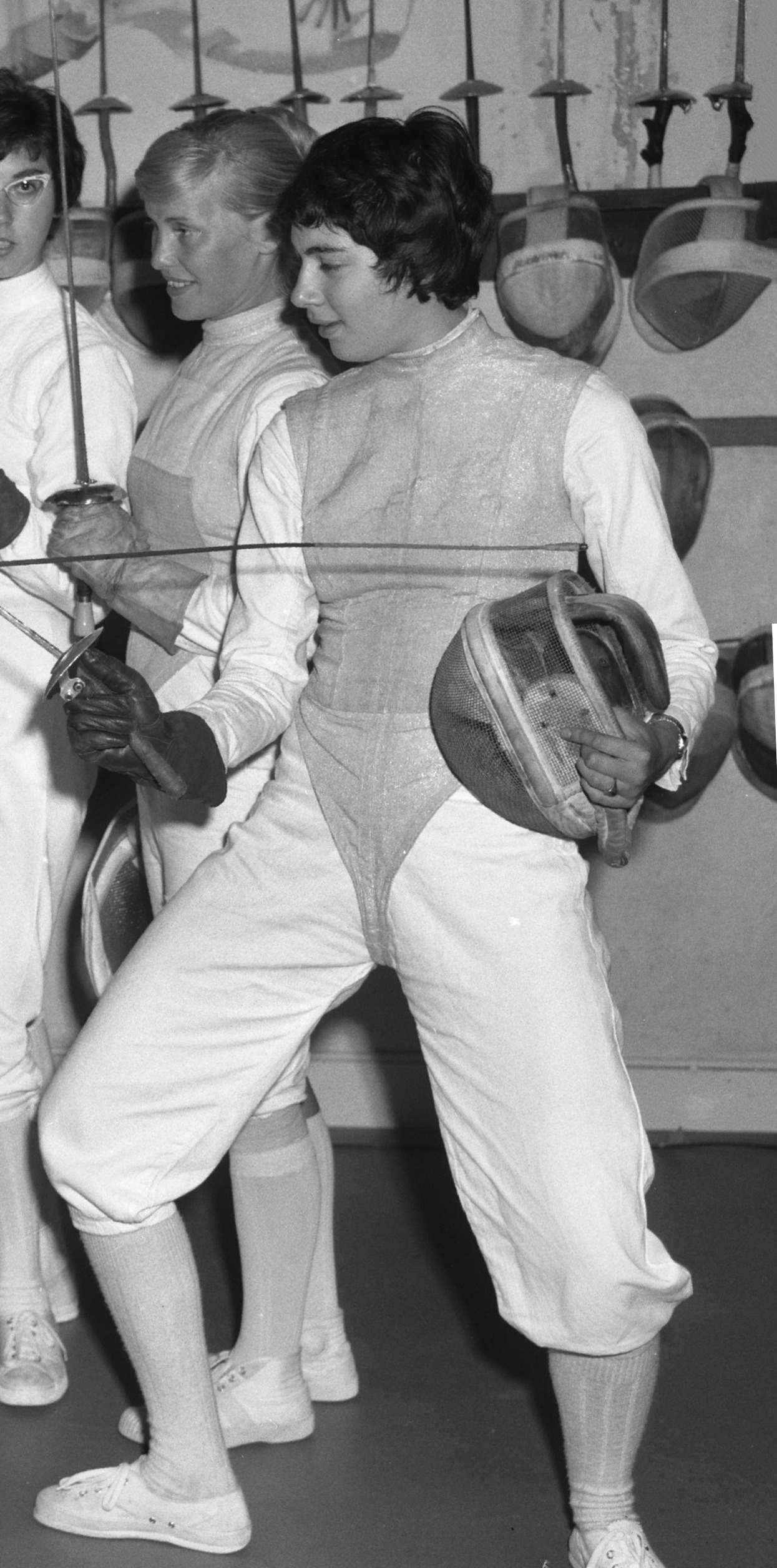
- Elly Botbijl in 1960

Personal information
- Born: 11 December 1940 (age 85) Sukabumi, Indonesia
- Height: 1.76 m (5 ft 9 in)
- Weight: 63 kg (139 lb)

Sport
- Sport: Fencing

Elly Botbijl (born 11 December 1940) is a retired Dutch fencer. She competed in the women's individual and team foil events at the 1960 Summer Olympics.
