= Nina Kleijweg =

Dutch fencer (born 1938)

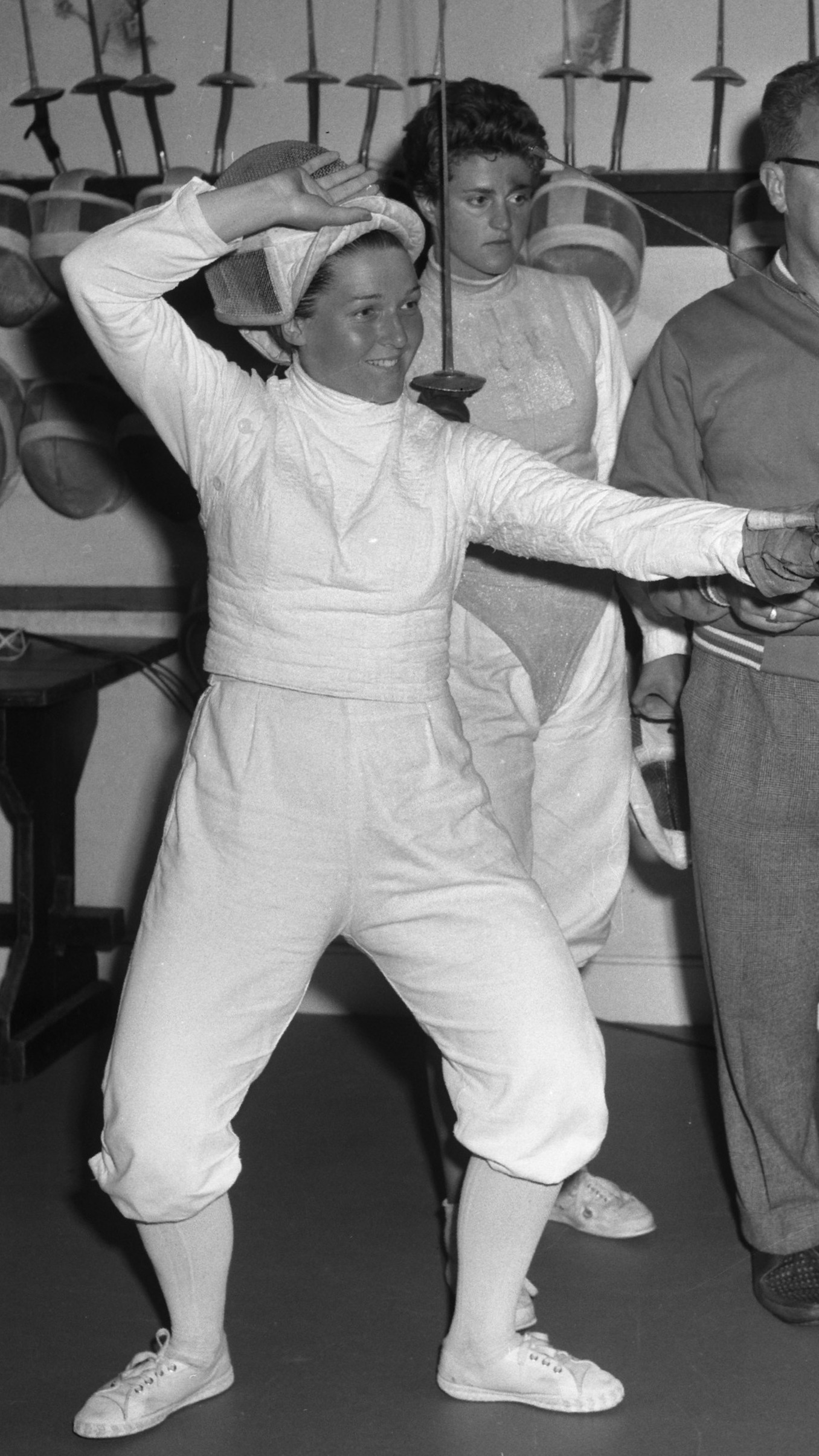
- Nina Kleijweg in 1960

Personal information
- Born: 18 April 1938 (age 88) Rotterdam, Netherlands
- Height: 1.60 m (5 ft 3 in)
- Weight: 62 kg (137 lb)

Sport
- Sport: Fencing

Nina Kleijweg (born 18 April 1938) is a retired Dutch fencer. She competed in the women's individual and team foil events at the 1960 Summer Olympics.
