= Janice Romary =

American fencer (1927–2007)

Janice-Lee York Romary
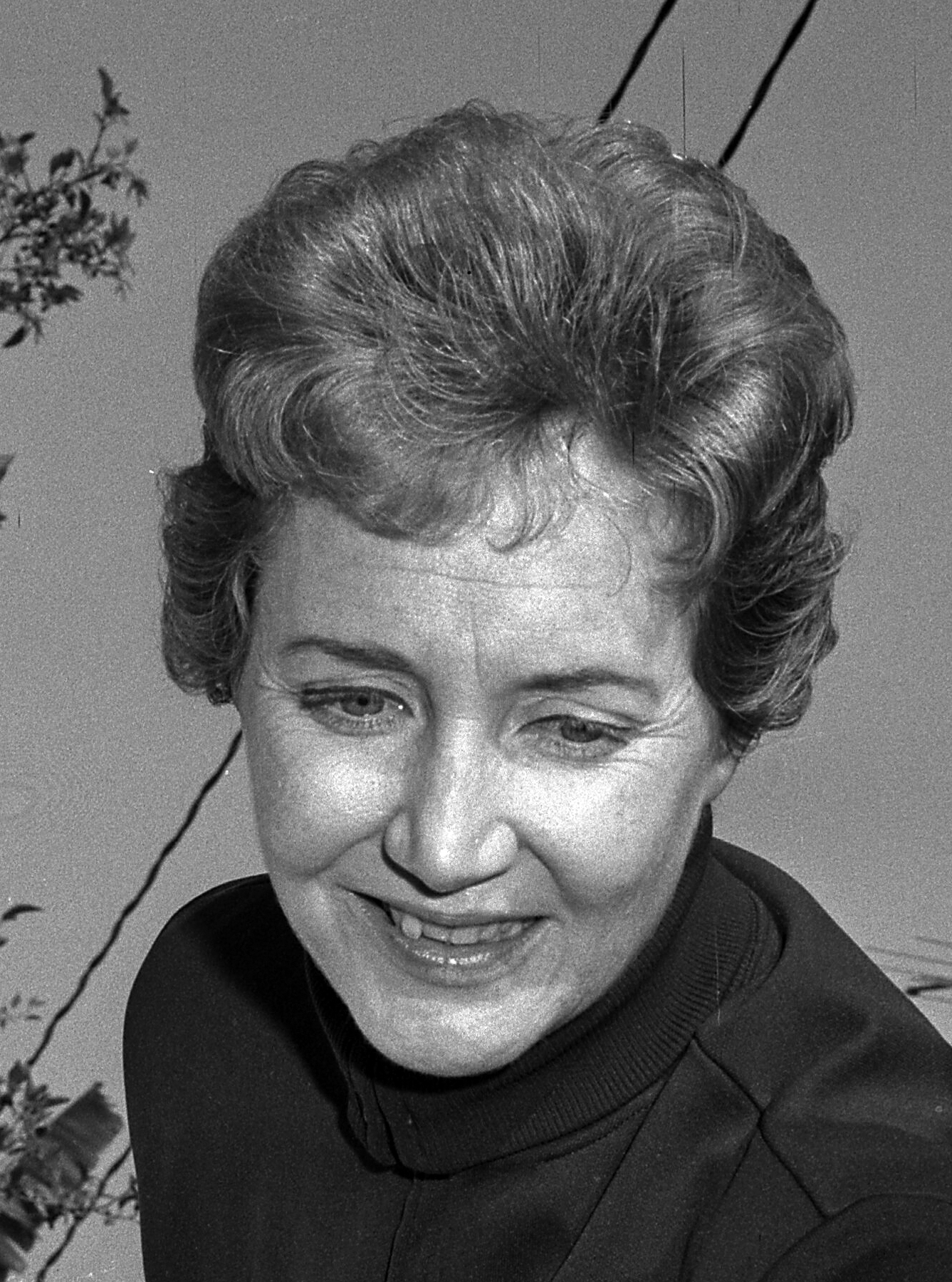
- Romary in 1968

Personal information
- Born: August 6, 1927 San Mateo, California, United States
- Died: May 31, 2007 (aged 79) Klamath Falls, Oregon, United States

Sport
- Sport: Fencing

Janice-Lee York Romary (August 6, 1927 – May 31, 2007) was a U.S. women's Olympic foil fencer who was the first woman to appear at six Olympic Games.

== Early life ==
Born Janice-Lee York in Palo Alto, California, she learned fencing at Max Reinhardt's Dramatic Workshop in Hollywood, California, a club managed by her father. Romary attended the University of Southern California from 1946 to 1949, where she fenced at the University of Southern California Fencing Club.

== Olympics and U.S. championships ==
She competed in women's individual foil at the 1948 London Olympics, the 1952 Helsinki Olympics, the 1956 Melbourne Olympics, the 1960 Rome Olympics, the 1964 Tokyo Olympics and the 1968 Mexico City Olympics — the first woman to compete in six Olympics, a feat matched four years later by Romanian discus thrower Lia Manoliu and finally surpassed in 1988 by fellow fencer, Sweden's Kerstin Palm. In recognition of her extraordinary streak of Olympic appearances, Romary was honored at the Mexico City Olympics in 1968 by being the first woman to carry the flag for the United States.

Though she never medaled at the Olympics, she was a finalist in women's individual foil in 1952 and 1956, finishing fourth both times: in 1952, she tied for third place, but lost to Denmark's Karen Lachmann on touches.

In addition to her Olympic success, Romary won the U.S. foil championship in 1950, 1951,1956, 1957, 1960, 1961, 1964, 1966, 1967, and 1968, missing the 1959 championships due to pregnancy. Her 10 U.S. championships is more than any other male or female fencer. She won the 1967 Worldwide Sportsman's Award, and in August 1968, became the only fencer to ever win the Helms Foundation Athlete of the Month Award. She also won a silver and a bronze medal at the Pan American Games in 1963, and a gold in 1967.

Romary's husband, Charles Romary, was also an épée and sabre fencer, sports that did not exist at the Olympic level for women until the 1996 Atlanta Olympics. He took up the sport after marrying Janice in 1953.

== Post-competition career ==
Romary's association with the Olympics and the sport of fencing continued well beyond her Olympic competition. She was women's administrator for the United States Olympic Committee for the 1976 Montreal Olympics and was responsible for all U.S. women competitors. At the 1984 Los Angeles Olympics, she was commissioner of fencing.

Romary was inducted into the United States Fencing Association Hall of Fame in the 1970s. After retiring from fencing, she moved to Klamath Falls, Oregon, with her husband, where they ran a water purification business. She died in Klamath Falls on May 31, 2007, of complications from Alzheimer's disease.

== See also ==
- List of athletes with the most appearances at Olympic Games
- List of USFA Hall of Fame members

Olympic Games
Preceded by Terry McDermott	Flagbearer for United States; Mexico City 1968	Succeeded by Dianne Holum
