= Danny van Rossem =

Dutch fencer

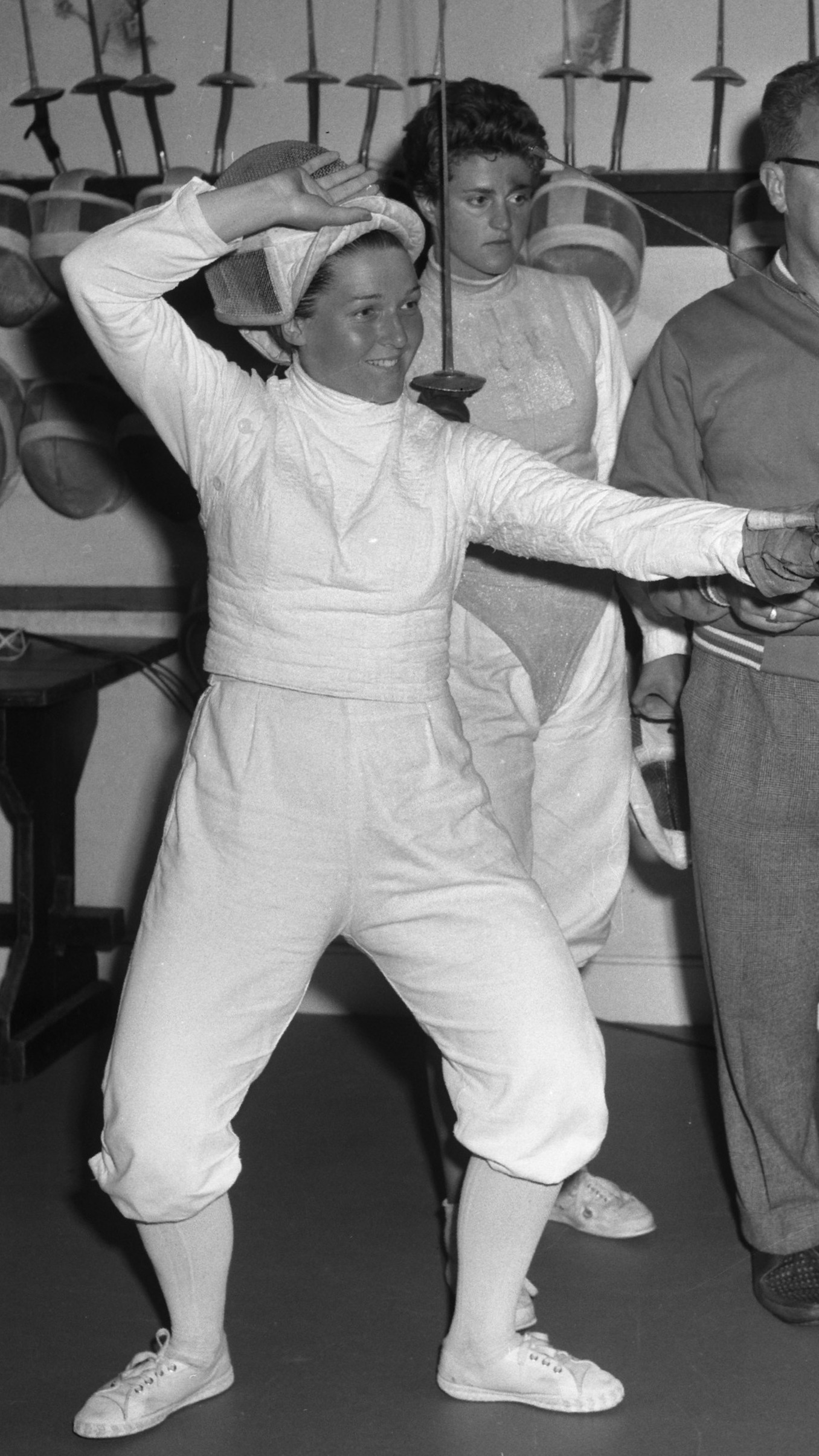
- Nina Kleijweg and Danny van Rossem (right) in 1960

Personal information
- Full name: Daniële van Rossem
- Born: 10 June 1935 Overschie, Netherlands
- Died: 7 March 2025 (aged 89) Leiderdorp, Netherlands
- Height: 1.68 m (5 ft 6 in)
- Weight: 63 kg (139 lb)

Sport
- Sport: Fencing

Daniële "Danny" van Rossem (10 June 1935 – 7 March 2025) was a Dutch fencer. She competed in the women's individual and team foil events at the 1960 Summer Olympics.

Van Rossem died on 7 March 2025 in Leiderdorp, at the age of 89.
