= Maxine Mitchell =

American fencer

Personal information
- Born: July 22, 1917 Leroy, Washington, United States
- Died: November 7, 1991 (aged 74) Fontana, California, United States

Sport
- Sport: Fencing

Maxine Mitchell (July 22, 1917 – November 7, 1991) was an American foil fencer. Undefeated in the 1955 U.S. individual women's national championship, she competed in the women's individual foil event at four Olympic Games.
