= Régine Veronnet =

French fencer

Régine Marie Louise Veronnet
Personal information
- Born: 15 November 1929 Dijon, France

Sport
- Sport: Fencing

Régine Veronnet (born 15 November 1929) is a French former foil fencer. She competed at the 1956 and 1960 Summer Olympics.
