= Rosemarie Weiß-Scherberger =

German fencer (1935–2016)

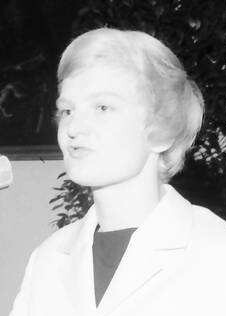
- Weiß-Scherberger in 1964

Personal information
- Born: 19 July 1935 Baden-Württemberg, Germany
- Died: 20 July 2016 (aged 81)

Sport
- Sport: Fencing
Medal record
Representing Germany
Olympic Games
| Bronze medal – third place | 1964 Tokyo | Team foil |
Representing West Germany
World Championships
| Bronze medal – third place | 1959 Budapest | Team foil |
Summer Universiade
| Gold medal – first place | 1959 Turin | Individual foil |
| Silver medal – second place | 1959 Turin | Team foil |
| Bronze medal – third place | 1961 Sofia | Team foil |

Rosemarie Weiß-Scherberger (19 July 1935 – 20 July 2016) was a German fencer. She won a bronze medal in the women's team foil event at the 1964 Summer Olympics.
