= Belkis Leal =

Venezuelan fencer (born 1940)

Personal information
- Born: 21 May 1940 (age 86) Caracas, Venezuela

Sport
- Sport: Fencing

Belkis Leal (born 21 May 1940) is a Venezuelan fencer. She competed in the women's individual and team foil events at the 1960 Summer Olympics.
