= Norma Santini =

Venezuelan fencer (born 1932)

Personal information
- Born: 20 July 1932 (age 93) Valera, Venezuela

Sport
- Sport: Fencing

Norma Santini (born 20 July 1932) is a Venezuelan fencer. She competed in the women's individual and team foil events at the 1960 Summer Olympics.
