= Judy Goodrich (fencer) =

American fencer

Personal information
- Born: June 9, 1939 (age 87) Flint, Michigan, United States

Sport
- Sport: Fencing

Judy Goodrich (born 9 June 1939) is a retired American foil fencer. She competed at the 1956 and 1960 Summer Olympics.
