= Catherine Delbarre =

French fencer (1925–2025)

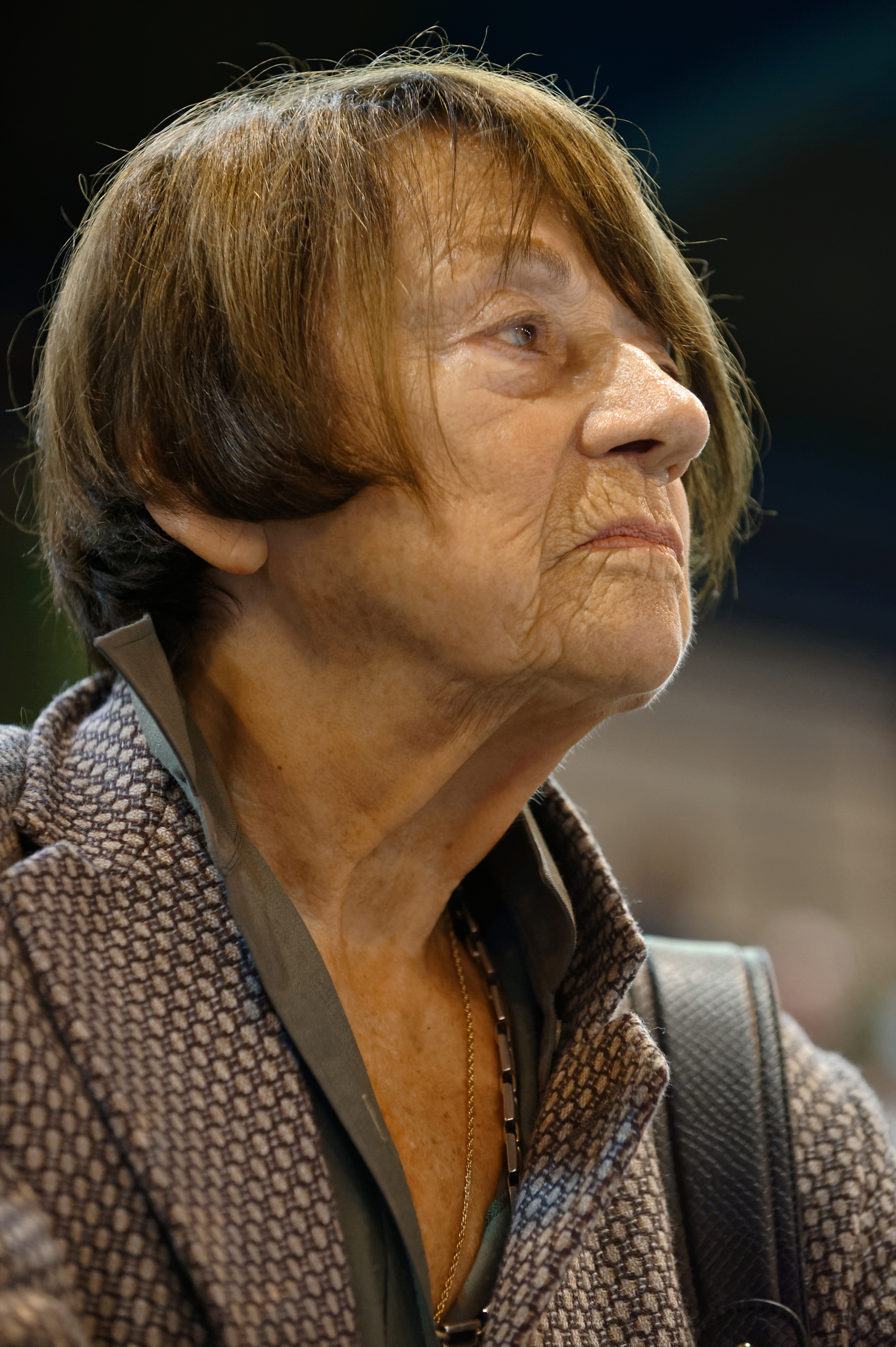
- Kate d’Oriola in 2015

Personal information
- Born: 8 June 1925 Calais, France
- Died: 14 June 2025 (aged 100) Nîmes, France
- Height: 1.65 m (5 ft 5 in)
- Weight: 56 kg (123 lb)

Fencing career
- Sport: Fencing
- Country: France
- Weapon: Foil
- Club: FCM Escrime Mulhouse
Medal record
World Championships
Silver medal – second place	Copenhague 1952	Team
Silver medal – second place	Bruxelles 1953	Team
Silver medal – second place	Rome 1955	Team
Silver medal – second place	London 1956	Team
Bronze medal – third place	Luxembourg 1954	Team
Bronze medal – third place	Philadelphia 1958	Team

Catherine Delbarre (8 June 1925 – 14 June 2025), also known as Kate Bernheim during her first marriage, then as Kate d'Oriola, was a French foil fencer. She competed at the 1956 and 1960 Summer Olympics. She was married to France's most titled fencing champion Christian d'Oriola (1928–2007). Delbarre died on 14 June 2025, six days after her 100th birthday.
