= Ecaterina Orb-Lazăr =

Romanian fencer

Personal information
- Born: 7 May 1935 (age 91) Turda, Romania

Sport
- Sport: Fencing

Ecaterina Orb-Lazăr (born 7 May 1935) is a Romanian fencer. She competed at the 1956 and 1960 Summer Olympics.
