= Australia at the 1964 Summer Olympics =

- IOC code: AUS
- NOC: Australian Olympic Federation

in Tokyo
- Competitors: 243 (203 men, 40 women) in 19 sports
- Flag bearers: Ivan Lund (opening); Dawn Fraser (closing)
- Medals Ranked 8th: Gold 6 Silver 2 Bronze 10 Total 18

Summer Olympics appearances (overview)
- 1896; 1900; 1904; 1908; 1912; 1920; 1924; 1928; 1932; 1936; 1948; 1952; 1956; 1960; 1964; 1968; 1972; 1976; 1980; 1984; 1988; 1992; 1996; 2000; 2004; 2008; 2012; 2016; 2020; 2024; 2028

Other related appearances
- 1906 Intercalated Games –––– Australasia (1908–1912)

Australia competed at the 1964 Summer Olympics in Tokyo, Japan. 243 competitors, 203 men and 40 women, took part in 133 events in 19 sports. Australian athletes have competed in every Summer Olympic Games.

== Medalists ==
=== Gold ===
- Betty Cuthbert — Athletics, Women's 400 m
- Robert Windle — Swimming, Men's 1500 m Freestyle
- Ian O'Brien — Swimming, Men's 200 m Breaststroke
- Kevin Berry — Swimming, Men's 200 m Butterfly
- Dawn Fraser — Swimming, Women's 100 m Freestyle
- William Northam, Peter O'Donnell, and James Sargeant — Sailing, Men's 5½ Meter Class

=== Silver ===
- Michele Brown — Athletics, Women's High Jump
- Lynette Bell, Dawn Fraser, Janice Murphy, and Robyn Thorn — Swimming, Women's 4 × 100 m Freestyle Relay

=== Bronze ===
- Ron Clarke — Athletics, Men's 10.000 m
- Marilyn Black — Athletics, Women's 200 m
- Judith Pollock — Athletics, Women's 400 m
- Pamela Kilborn — Athletics, Women's 80 m Hurdles
- Theodore Boronovskis — Judo, Men's Open Class
- Allan Wood — Swimming, Men's 400 m Freestyle
- Allan Wood — Swimming, Men's 1500 m Freestyle
- David Dickson, Peter Doak, John Ryan, and Robert Windle — Swimming, Men's 4 × 100 m Freestyle Relay
- David Dickson, Kevin Berry, Ian O'Brien, and Peter Reynolds — Swimming, Men's 4 × 100 m Medley Relay
- Mervyn Crossman, Paul Dearing, Raymond Evans, Brian Glencross, Robin Hodder, John McBryde, Donald McWatters, Patrick Nilan, Eric Pearce, Julian Pearce, Desmond Piper, Donald Smart, Anthony Waters, and Graham Wood — Field Hockey, Men's Team Competition

== Athletics ==
Men's High Jump

- Lawrie Peckham
  - Qualifying Round — 2.06m
  - Final — 2.09m (→ 10th place)

Women's 800 metres

- Dixie Willis
  - Heat — did not compete (→ did not advance)

== Basketball ==
=== Men's team competition ===
- Preliminary Round
  - Lost to United States 45-78
  - Defeated Peru 81-62
  - Lost to Yugoslavia 70-74
  - Defeated South Korea 64-58
  - Lost to Finland 59-61
  - Lost to Uruguay 57-58
  - Lost to Brazil 57-69
- Classification Matches
  - 9th-12th place: Defeated Mexico 70-58
  - 9th/10th place: Defeated Japan 64-57 → 9th place
- Team Roster
  - Scott Davie
  - Brendon Hackwill
  - John Heard
  - Bill Wyatt
  - Michael Ah Matt
  - Werner Linde
  - Ken Cole
  - Les Hody
  - Carl Rodwell
  - Mike Dancis
  - Lindsay Gaze
  - John Gardiner
- Head coach: Keith Miller

== Boxing ==
=== Flyweight ===
- Darryl Norwood (=9th)

=== Bantamweight ===
- William Booth (=17th)

=== Featherweight ===
- Randall Hope (=17th)

=== Lightweight ===
- Adrian Blair (=9th)

=== Light welterweight ===
- Julian Rossi (=17th)

=== Welterweight ===
- Frank Roberts (=17th)

=== Light middleweight ===
- Tony Barber (=5th)

=== Middleweight ===
- John Bukowski (=17th)

=== Light heavyweight ===
- Fred Casey (=17th)

=== Heavyweight ===
- Athol McQueen (=5th)

== Cycling ==
14 cyclists represented Australia in 1964.

=== Individual road race ===
- Ray Bilney
- Michael Hollingsworth
- David Humphreys
- Malcolm McCredie

=== Sprint ===
- Thomas Harrison
- Gordon Johnson

=== 1000m time trial ===
- Richard Paris

=== Tandem ===
- Ian Browne
- Daryl Perkins

=== Individual pursuit ===
- Richard Hine

=== Team pursuit ===
- Kevin Brislin
- Robert Baird
- Victor Browne
- Henk Vogels, Sr.

== Diving ==
Women

Athlete	Event	Preliminary		Final			
Athlete	Event	Points	Rank	Points	Rank	Total	Rank
Robyn Bradshaw	3 m springboard	77.64	13	Did not advance			
Susan Knight	3 m springboard	76.76	14	Did not advance			
Robyn Bradshaw	10 m platform	46.58	12 Q	41.58	8	88.16	9
Susan Knight	10 m platform	41.84	20	Did not advance			

== Fencing ==
18 fencers, 13 men and 5 women, represented Australia in 1964.

=== Men's foil ===
- David McKenzie
- Brian McCowage
- Ivan Lund

=== Men's team foil ===
- Gerard Tubier, David McKenzie, John Douglas, Brian McCowage, Ivan Lund

=== Men's épée ===
- John Humphreys
- Ivan Lund
- Russell Hobby

=== Men's team épée ===
- Russell Hobby, John Humphreys, Imants Terrauds, Ivan Lund, Ian Bowditch

=== Men's sabre ===
- Henry Sommerville
- Alexander Martonffy
- Les Tornallyay

=== Men's team sabre ===
- Alexander Martonffy, Les Tornallyay, Paul Rizzuto, Brian McCowage, Henry Sommerville

=== Women's foil ===
- Janet Hopner
- Jan Redman
- Johanna Winter

=== Women's team foil ===
- Jan Redman, Johanna Winter, Val Winter, Janet Hopner, Ulrike Winter

== Judo ==
Australia was represented in judo by four male competitors.

Lightweight

- Brian Dalton (=9th)
- Ronald Ford (=19th)

Middleweight

- Peter Paige (=17th)

Open category

- Ted Boronovskis Bronze

== Modern pentathlon ==
Three male pentathletes represented Australia in 1964.

=== Individual ===
- Peter Macken
- Donald McMiken
- Duncan Page

=== Team ===
- Peter Macken
- Donald McMiken
- Duncan Page

== Sailing ==
Open

Athlete	Event	Race							Net points	Final rank
Athlete	Event	1	2	3	4	5	6	7	Net points	Final rank
Colin Ryrie	Finn	3	~~22~~	1	15	11	4	14	5273	6
John Dawe; Ian Winter	Flying Dutchman	13	4	~~DNF~~	7	DNF	DNF	9	2379	14
Martinus Visser; Thomas Owens	Star	8	16	~~DNF~~	10	5	7	12	2256	10
Graham Drane; Ian Quartermain; John Coon	Dragon	9	12	6	~~DNF~~	11	12	4	3243	12
Bill Northam; Peter O'Donnell; James Sargeant	5.5 Metre	1	6	2	1	~~DNF~~	1	4	5981	Gold medal

== Shooting ==
Eight shooters represented Australia in 1964.

Men

Athlete	Event	Final	
Athlete	Event	Score	Rank
Leslie Coffey	50 m pistol	508	45
Tibor Gonczol	25 m pistol	581	20
Rodney Johnson	50 m pistol	521	38
James Kirkwood	50 m rifle, prone	589	26
John Murphy	50 m rifle, three positions	1104	35
Michael Papps	25 m pistol	582	19
Norman Rule	50 m rifle, prone	590	22
Don Tolhurst	50 m rifle, three positions	1141	10

== Swimming ==
Men

Athlete	Event	Heat		Semifinal		Final	
Athlete	Event	Time	Rank	Time	Rank	Time	Rank
David Dickson	100 m freestyle	55.1	=5 Q	54.9	9	Did not advance	
Peter Phelps	100 m freestyle	56.1	=26	Did not advance			
John Ryan	100 m freestyle	55.5	=11 Q	56.5	=23	Did not advance	
Russell Phegan	400 m freestyle	4:19.8	5 Q	—N/a		4:20.2	7
Bob Windle	400 m freestyle	4:21.6	9	—N/a		Did not advance	
Allan Wood	400 m freestyle	4:16.2	2 Q	—N/a		4:15.1	3rd place, bronze medalist(s)
Russell Phegan	1500 m freestyle	17:28.9	6 Q	—N/a		17:22.4	5
Bob Windle	1500 m freestyle	17:15.9	1 Q	—N/a		17:01.7 OR	1st place, gold medalist(s)
Allan Wood	1500 m freestyle	17:26.3	3 Q	—N/a		17:07.7	3rd place, bronze medalist(s)
John Byrom	200 m backstroke	2:27.0	29	Did not advance			
Peter Reynolds	200 m backstroke	2:15.9	4 Q	2:15.6	6 Q	2:16.6	8
Ian O'Brien	200 m breaststroke	2:31.4	4 Q	2:28.7 OR	1 Q	2:27.8 WR	1st place, gold medalist(s)
John Oravainen	200 m breaststroke	2:38.7	16 Q	2:39.6	15	Did not advance	
Peter Tonkin	200 m breaststroke	2:39.3	17	Did not advance			
Kevin Berry	200 m butterfly	2:11.0	2 Q	2:09.8	2 Q	2:06.6 WR	1st place, gold medalist(s)
Brett Hill	200 m butterfly	2:12.8	5 Q	2:11.9	=5 Q	2:12.8	7
John Stark	200 m butterfly	2:15.3	11 Q	2:18.4	16	Did not advance	
Alex Alexander	400 m individual medley	5:10.8	17	—N/a		Did not advance	
Terry Buck	400 m individual medley	5:02.5	6 Q	—N/a		5:03.0	8
John Oravainen	400 m individual medley	5:07.0	12	—N/a		Did not advance	
David Dickson; Peter Doak; John Ryan; Bob Windle	4 × 100 m freestyle relay	3:40.6	2 Q	—N/a		3:39.1	3rd place, bronze medalist(s)
David Dickson; Allan Wood; Peter Doak; Bob Windle; John Konrads; John Ryan	4 × 200 m freestyle relay	8:18.3	8 Q	—N/a		8:05.7	4
Peter Reynolds; Ian O'Brien; Kevin Berry; David Dickson; Peter Tonkin	4 × 100 m medley relay	4:11.4	7 Q	—N/a		4:02.3	3rd place, bronze medalist(s)

Women

Athlete	Event	Heat		Semifinal		Final	
Athlete	Event	Time	Rank	Time	Rank	Time	Rank
Lyn Bell	100 m freestyle	1:02.4	5 Q	1:02.2	=3 Q	1:02.7	8
Dawn Fraser	100 m freestyle	1:00.6	1 Q	59.9	1 Q	59.5 OR	1st place, gold medalist(s)
Robyn Thorn	100 m freestyle	1:03.7	=14 Q	1:03.9	=14	Did not advance	
Nanette Duncan	400 m freestyle	4:55.2	9	—N/a		Did not advance	
Dawn Fraser	400 m freestyle	4:52.2	5 Q	—N/a		4:47.6	4
Kim Herford	400 m freestyle	4:49.8	4 Q	—N/a		4:52.9	7
Marlene Dayman	100 m backstroke	1:12.9	23	—N/a		Did not advance	
Nanette Duncan	100 m backstroke	1:12.4	21	—N/a		Did not advance	
Belinda Woosley	100 m backstroke	1:15.3	28	—N/a		Did not advance	
Christine Barnetson	200 m breaststroke	DSQ		—N/a		Did not advance	
Linda McGill	200 m breaststroke	2:59.4	20	—N/a		Did not advance	
Marguerite Ruygrok	200 m breaststroke	2:53.1	9	—N/a		Did not advance	
Gillian de Greenlaw	100 m butterfly	1:14.8	28	Did not advance			
Linda McGill	100 m butterfly	1:11.7	22	Did not advance			
Jan Turner	100 m butterfly	1:14.4	27	Did not advance			
Jane Cortis	400 m individual medley	5:43.6	15	—N/a		Did not advance	
Linda McGill	400 m individual medley	5:38.3	8 Q	—N/a		5:28.4	5
Robyn Thorn; Jan Murphy; Lyn Bell; Dawn Fraser; Jan Turner	4 × 100 m freestyle relay	4:11.8	1 Q	—N/a		4:06.9	2nd place, silver medalist(s)
Nanette Duncan; Marguerite Ruygrok; Linda McGill; Dawn Fraser	4 × 100 m medley relay	4:52.3	9	—N/a		Did not advance	

== Water polo ==
=== First round ===
==== Group B ====
Pos	Team	Pld	W	D	L	GF	GA	GD	Pts	Qualification
1	Soviet Union	2	2	0	0	9	2	+7	4	Semifinals
2	Germany	2	1	0	1	5	4	+1	2	Semifinals
3	Australia	2	0	0	2	1	9	−8	0	

Source: Official Report p. 673

11 October 1964; 16:30	Official Report p.675	Soviet Union	6–0	Australia	Tokyo Metropolitan Indoor Swimming Pool; Referees: M. Manguillot (ESP)
11 October 1964; 16:30	Official Report p.675	Score by quarters: 1–0, 1–0, 2–0, 2–0			Tokyo Metropolitan Indoor Swimming Pool; Referees: M. Manguillot (ESP)
11 October 1964; 16:30	Official Report p.675	Kuznetsov, Semyonov 2	Goals	None	Tokyo Metropolitan Indoor Swimming Pool; Referees: M. Manguillot (ESP)

13 October 1964; 16:30	Official Report p.680	Australia	1–3	Germany	Tokyo Metropolitan Indoor Swimming Pool; Referees: C.H. Angerhausen (BEL)
13 October 1964; 16:30	Official Report p.680	Score by quarters: 0–1, 1–0, 0–2, 0–0			Tokyo Metropolitan Indoor Swimming Pool; Referees: C.H. Angerhausen (BEL)
13 October 1964; 16:30	Official Report p.680	Mills 1	Goals	three players 1	Tokyo Metropolitan Indoor Swimming Pool; Referees: C.H. Angerhausen (BEL)

== Wrestling ==
=== Freestyle ===
Light Heavyweight

- Hughie Williams
