= Fencing at the 1964 Summer Olympics – Women's team foil =

Women's team foil at the Games of the XVIII Olympiad
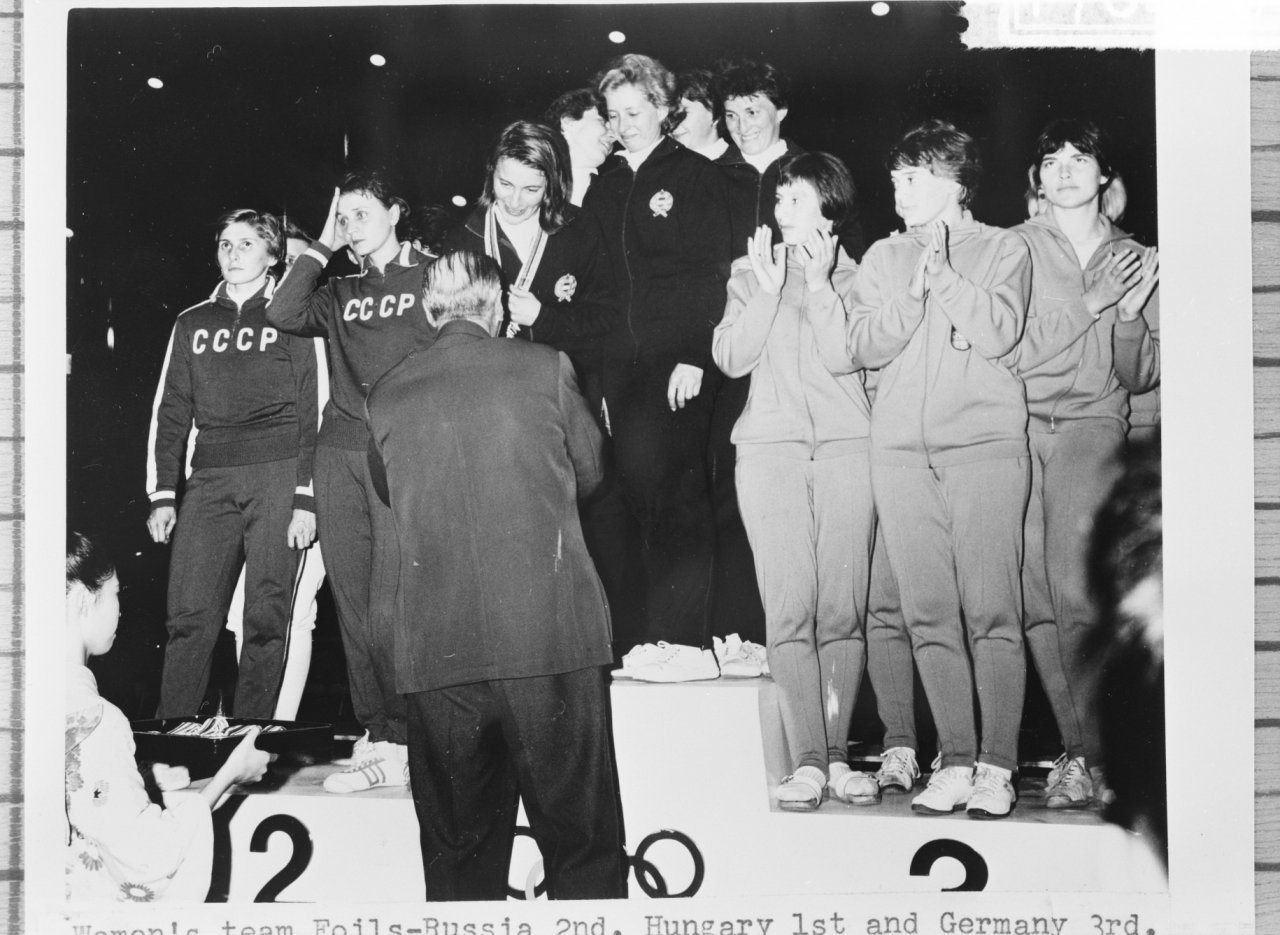
- Venue: Waseda Memorial Hall
- Dates: October 16 – 17
- Competitors: 47 from 10 nations

Medalists
1st place, gold medalist(s)		Ildikó Ságiné Ujlakyné Rejtő, Lídia Sákovicsné Dömölky, Katalin Nagyné Juhász, Judit Ágoston-Mendelényi, Paula Marosi	Hungary
2nd place, silver medalist(s)		Valentina Rastvorova, Tatyana Petrenko-Samusenko, Lyudmila Shishova, Valentina Prudskova, Galina Gorokhova	Soviet Union
3rd place, bronze medalist(s)		Helga Mees, Heidi Schmid, Romy Weiß-Scherberger, Gundi Theuerkauff	United Team of Germany

The women's team foil was one of eight fencing events on the fencing at the 1964 Summer Olympics programme. It was the second appearance of the event. The competition was held from October 16 – 17 1964. 47 fencers from 10 nations competed.

== Medalists ==
Gold	Silver	Bronze
Hungary	Soviet Union	United Team of Germany

== Results ==
=== Round 1 ===
Ties between teams were broken by individual victories (in parentheses), then by touches received.

Pool A
1.	Italy	1-0 (9)	Q2
2.	France	1-0 (9)	Q2
3.	Great Britain	0-2 (13)

Pool B
1.	Romania	1-0 (10)	Q2
2.	Hungary	1-0 (9)	Q2
3.	United States	0-2 (7)

Pool C
1.	Soviet Union	2-0 (23)	Q2
2.	United Team of Germany	2-0 (21)	Q2
3.	Australia	0-2 (9)
4.	Japan	0-2 (8)

=== Championship rounds ===
Quarter-finals
United Team of Germany	8
France	8
Soviet Union	9
Romania	4

Semi-finals
United Team of Germany	6
Hungary	9
Soviet Union	9
Italy	5

Final
Hungary	9
Soviet Union	7
Third place
United Team of Germany	9
Italy	5

Fifth place match
Romania	9
France	6

== Rosters ==
Australia

- Jan Redman
- Johanna Winter
- Val Winter
- Janet Hopner
- Ulrike Winter

France

- Catherine Rousselet-Ceretti
- Marie-Chantal Depetris-Demaille
- Brigitte Gapais-Dumont
- Annick Level
- Colette Revenu

Germany

- Helga Mees
- Heidi Schmid
- Romy Weiß-Scherberger
- Gundi Theuerkauff

Great Britain

- Shirley Netherway
- Theresa Offredy
- Janet Bewley-Cathie
- Mary Watts-Tobin

Hungary

- Ildikó Ságiné Ujlakyné Rejtő
- Lídia Sákovicsné Dömölky
- Katalin Nagyné Juhász
- Judit Ágoston-Mendelényi
- Paula Marosi

Italy

- Antonella Ragno-Lonzi
- Giovanna Masciotta
- Irene Camber-Corno
- Natalina Sanguinetti
- Bruna Colombetti-Peroncini

Japan

- Yoshie Komori
- Tamiko Yasui
- Tomoko Owada
- Yoshie Takeuchi

Romania

- Olga Orban-Szabo
- Ileana Gyulai-Drîmbă-Jenei
- Ana Derșidan-Ene-Pascu
- Maria Vicol
- Ecaterina Stahl-Iencic

Soviet Union

- Valentina Rastvorova
- Tatyana Petrenko-Samusenko
- Lyudmila Shishova
- Valentina Prudskova
- Galina Gorokhova

United States

- Anne Drungis
- Jan York-Romary
- Denise O'Connor
- Harriet King
- Tommy Angell

== Sources ==
- Tokyo Organizing Committee (1964). The Games of the XVIII Olympiad: Tokyo 1964, vol. 2.
