= Fencing at the 1964 Summer Olympics – Women's foil =

Women's foil at the Games of the XVIII Olympiad
- Venue: Waseda Memorial Hall
- Dates: October 14 – 15
- Competitors: 39 from 17 nations

Medalists
1st place, gold medalist(s)		Ildikó Ságiné Ujlakyné Rejtő	Hungary
2nd place, silver medalist(s)		Helga Mees	United Team of Germany
3rd place, bronze medalist(s)		Antonella Ragno-Lonzi	Italy

The women's foil was one of eight fencing events on the fencing at the 1964 Summer Olympics programme. It was the ninth appearance of the event. The competition was held from October 14 – 15, 1964. 39 fencers from 17 nations competed.

== Medalists ==
Gold	Silver	Bronze
Ildikó Újlaky-Rejtő; Hungary	Helga Mees; United Team of Germany	Antonella Ragno; Italy

== Results ==
=== Round 1 ===
Pool A
1.	Harriet King (USA)	5-1	Q2
2.	Ildikó Újlaky-Rejtő (HUN)	4-2	Q2
3.	Helga Mees (EUA)	4-2	Q2
4.	Catherine Rousselet (FRA)	3-3	QB
4.	Christina Wahlberg (SWE)	3-3	QB
6.	Jan Redman (AUS)	1-5
7.	Shin Kwang Sook (KOR)	1-5

Barrage A
4.	Catherine Rousselet (FRA)	1-0	Q2
5.	Christina Wahlberg (SWE)	0-1

Pool B
1.	Lidia Sakovice (HUN)	6-0	Q2
2.	Bruna Colombetti (ITA)	5-1	Q2
3.	Ginette Rossini (LUX)	4-2	Q2
4.	Ana Dersidan (ROU)	2-4	QB
4.	Yasui Tamiko (JPN)	2-4	QB
6.	Johanna Winter (AUS)	1-5
7.	Pacita Weidel (CAN)	1-5

Barrage B
4.	Ana Dersidan (ROU)	1-0	Q2
5.	Yasui Tamiko (JPN)	0-1

Pool C
1.	Brigitte Gapais (FRA)	3-2	Q2
1.	Katalin Juhász (HUN)	3-2	Q2
1.	Owada Tomoko (JPN)	3-2	Q2
1.	Kerstin Palm (SWE)	3-2	Q2
5.	Maria Vicol (ROU)	2-3
6.	Tommy Angell (USA)	1-5

Pool D
1.	Galina Gorokhova (URS)	4-1	Q2
2.	Olga Szabo (ROU)	3-2	Q2
3.	Rosemarie Scherberger (EUA)	3-2	Q2
4.	Shirley Netherwy (GBR)	2-3	QB
4.	Janice-Lee Romary (USA)	2-3	QB
6.	Takeuchi Yoshie (JPN)	1-4

Barrage D
4.	Shirley Netherwy (GBR)	1-0	Q2
5.	Janice-Lee Romary (USA)	0-1

Pool E
1.	Antonella Ragno (ITA)	6-0	Q2
2.	Valentina Rastvorova (URS)	5-1	Q2
3.	Mary Watts-Tobin (GBR)	4-2	Q2
4.	Mireya Rodriguez (CUB)	3-3	Q2
5.	Colette Flesch (LUX)	2-4
6.	Patricia Skinner (NRH)	1-5
7.	Janet Hopner (AUS)	0-6

Pool F
1.	Valentina Prudskova (URS)	4-1	Q2
2.	Giovanna Masciotta (ITA)	4-1	Q2
3.	H. Schmid (EUA)	3-2	Q2
4.	Esther Romano (ARG)	2-3	Q2
5.	Annick Level (FRA)	1-4
6.	Janet Bewley-Cathie (GBR)	1-4

=== Round 2 ===
Pool A
1.	Harriet King (USA)	3-2	Q3
2.	Katalin Juhász (HUN)	3-2	Q3
3.	Bruna Colombetti (ITA)	3-2	Q3
4.	Catherine Rousselet (FRA)	3-2	Q3
5.	Valentina Prudskova (URS)	2-3
6.	Mireya Rodriguez (CUB)	1-4

Pool B
1.	Olga Szabo (ROU)	4-1	Q3
2.	Valentina Rastvorova (URS)	4-1	Q3
3.	Lidia Sakovics (HUN)	3-2	Q3
4.	Helga Mees (EUA)	2-3	QB
4.	Ginette Rossini (LUX)	2-3	QB
6.	Shirley Netherway (GBR)	0-5

Barrage B
4.	Helga Mees (EUA)	1-0	Q3
5.	Ginette Rossini (LUX)	0-1

Pool C
1.	Antonella Ragno (ITA)	4-1	Q3
2.	H. Schmid (EUA)	4-1	Q3
3.	Owada Tomoko (JPN)	2-3	QB
3.	Esther Romano (ARG)	2-3	QB
3.	Mary Watts-Tobin (GBR)	2-3	QB
6.	Brigitte Gapais (FRA)	1-4

Barrage C
3.	Esther Romano (ARG)	1-0	Q3
4.	Mary Watts-Tobin (GBR)	1-0	Q3
5.	Owada Tomoko (JPN)	0-2

Pool D
1.	Galina Gorokhova (URS)	5-0	Q3
2.	Ana Dersidan (ROU)	3-2	Q3
3.	Giovanna Masciotta (ITA)	2-3	QB
3.	Rosemarie Scherberger (EUA)	2-3	QB
3.	Ildikó Újlaky-Rejtő (HUN)	2-3	QB
6.	Kerstin Palm (SWE)	1-4

Barrage D
3.	Giovanna Masciotta (ITA)	1-0	Q3
4.	Ildiko Ujlaki (HUN)	1-0	Q3
5.	Rosemarie Scherberger (EUA)	0-2

=== Knockout rounds ===
The winner of each group advanced to the final pool, while the runner-up moved into a 5th-place semifinal.

==== Group 1 ====
Round of 16
Ildikó Újlaky-Rejtő (HUN)	8
Valentina Rastvorova (URS)	6
Bruna Colombetti (ITA)	8
Mary Watts-Tobin (GBR)	6

Quarterfinals
Ildikó Újlaky-Rejtő (HUN)	8
Bruna Colombetti (ITA)	3

==== Group 2 ====
Round of 16
Galina Gorokhova (URS)	8
Esther Romano (ARG)	4
Giovanna Masciotta (ITA)	8
Olga Szabo (ROU)	6

Quarterfinals
Galina Gorokhova (URS)	8
Giovanna Masciotta (ITA)	7

==== Group 3 ====
Round of 16
Helga Mees (EUA)	8
Lidia Sakovics (HUN)	5
Catherine Rousselet (FRA)	8
Harriet King (USA)	6

Quarterfinals
Helga Mees (EUA)	8
Catherine Rousselet (FRA)	6

==== Group 4 ====
Round of 16
Antonella Ragno (ITA)	8
Ana Dersidan (ROU)	4
Katalin Juhász (HUN)	8
H. Schmid (EUA)	4

Quarterfinals
Antonella Ragno (ITA)	8
Katalin Juhász (HUN)	4

=== Fifth place semifinal ===
Fifth place semifinals
Giovanna Masciotta (ITA)	8
Bruna Colombetti (ITA)	6
Catherine Rousselet (FRA)	7
Katalin Juhász (HUN)	8

Fifth place match
Giovanna Masciotta (ITA)	5
Katalin Juhász (HUN)	8

=== Final ===
Final pool
Rank	Name
1.	Helga Mees (EUA)	2-1
1.	Antonella Ragno (ITA)	2-1
1.	Ildikó Újlaky-Rejtő (HUN)	2-1
4.	Galina Gorokhova (URS)	0-3

Medals barrage
Rank	Name
1st place, gold medalist(s)	Ildikó Újlaky-Rejtő (HUN)	2-0
2nd place, silver medalist(s)	Helga Mees (EUA)	1-1
3rd place, bronze medalist(s)	Antonella Ragno (ITA)	0-2

== Sources ==
- Tokyo Organizing Committee (1964). The Games of the XVIII Olympiad: Tokyo 1964, vol. 2.
