= Swimming at the 1964 Summer Olympics – Women's 100 metre butterfly =

Women's 100 metre butterfly at the Games of the XVIII Olympiad
- Venue: Yoyogi National Gymnasium
- Date: 14 October 1964 (heats); 15 October 1964 (semifinals); 16 October 1964 (final)
- Competitors: 31 from 16 nations
- Winning time: 1:04.7 (WR)

Medalists
| 1st place, gold medalist(s) | | Sharon Stouder | United States |
| 2nd place, silver medalist(s) | | Ada Kok | Netherlands |
| 3rd place, bronze medalist(s) | | Kathy Ellis | United States |

The women's 100 metre butterfly event at the 1964 Olympic Games took place on October 14 and October 16. This swimming event used the butterfly stroke. Because an Olympic size swimming pool is 50 metres long, this race consisted of two lengths of the pool.

== Medalists ==
| Gold | Sharon Stouder; United States |
| Silver | Ada Kok; Netherlands |
| Bronze | Kathy Ellis; United States |

== Results ==
=== Heats ===
Heat 1

Heat 1

| Rank | Athlete | Country | Time | Note |
|---|---|---|---|---|
| 1 | Kathy Ellis | United States | 1:07.8 | Q, OR |
| 2 | Eiko Takahashi | Japan | 1:08.4 | Q |
| 3 | Judy Gegan | Great Britain | 1:10.8 | Q |
| 4 | Adrie Lasterie | Netherlands | 1:11.2 | |
| 5 | Linda McGill | Australia | 1:11.7 | |
| 6 | Ursel Brunner | United Team of Germany | 1:13.6 | |
| 7 | Molly Tay | Malaysia | 1:23.0 | |

Heat 2

| Rank | Athlete | Country | Time | Note |
|---|---|---|---|---|
| 1 | Donna de Varona | United States | 1:07.5 | Q, OR |
| 2 | Mary Anne Cotterill | Great Britain | 1:09.4 | Q |
| 3 | Mary Beth Stewart | Canada | 1:09.9 | Q |
| 4 | Kimiko Sato | Japan | 1:10.6 | Q |

Heat 3

| Rank | Athlete | Country | Time | Note |
|---|---|---|---|---|
| 1 | Ada Kok | Netherlands | 1:07.8 | Q |
| 2 | Eila Pyrhönen | Finland | 1:07.9 | Q |
| 3 | Marianne Humeniuk | Canada | 1:09.5 | Q |
| 4 | Márta Egerváry | Hungary | 1:10.3 | Q |
| 5 | Tetiana Dev'iatova | Soviet Union | 1:11.1 | |
| 6 | Jenny Wood | Zimbabwe | 1:11.3 | |
| 7 | Ann Lallande | Puerto Rico | 1:17.1 | |

Heat 4

| Rank | Athlete | Country | Time | Note |
|---|---|---|---|---|
| 1 | Sharon Stouder | United States | 1:07.0 | Q, OR |
| 2 | Ute Noack | United Team of Germany | 1:09.2 | Q |
| 3 | Valentyna Yakovleva | Soviet Union | 1:11.2 | |
| 4 | Helen Kennedy | Canada | 1:11.2 | |
| 5 | Hiroko Saito | Japan | 1:13.1 | |
| 6 | Gillian de Greenlaw | Australia | 1:14.8 | |
| 7 | Margaret Harding | Puerto Rico | 1:23.7 | |

Heat 5

| Rank | Athlete | Country | Time | Note |
|---|---|---|---|---|
| 1 | Glenda Phillips | Great Britain | 1:10.3 | Q |
| 2 | Anna Maria Cecchi | Italy | 1:10.3 | Q |
| 3 | Heike Hustede-Nagel | United Team of Germany | 1:10.5 | Q |
| 4 | Silvia Belmar | Mexico | 1:12.1 | |
| 5 | María Ballesté | Spain | 1:13.1 | |
| 6 | Jan Turner | Australia | 1:14.4 | |

=== Semifinals ===
==== Semifinal 1 ====
| Rank | Athlete | Country | Time | Notes |
|---|---|---|---|---|
| 1 | Sharon Stouder | United States | 1:05.6 | Q, OR |
| 2 | Ada Kok | Netherlands | 1:05.9 | Q |
| 3 | Eila Pyrhönen | Finland | 1:07.9 | Q |
| 4 | Marianne Humeniuk | Canada | 1:09.2 | |
| 5 | Ute Noack | United Team of Germany | 1:09.3 | |
| 6 | Glenda Phillips | Great Britain | 1:10.6 | |
| 7 | Márta Egerváry | Hungary | 1:10.7 | |
| 8 | Kimiko Sato | Japan | 1:11.2 | |

==== Semifinal 2 ====
| Rank | Athlete | Country | Time | Notes |
|---|---|---|---|---|
| 1 | Kathleen Ellis | United States | 1:07.2 | Q |
| 2 | Donna de Varona | United States | 1:07.7 | Q |
| 3 | Eiko Takahashi | Japan | 1:07.8 | Q |
| 4 | Mary Beth Stewart | Canada | 1:08.6 | Q |
| 5 | Heike Hustede-Nagel | United Team of Germany | 1:08.8 | Q |
| 6 | Mary-Anne Cotterill | Great Britain | 1:09.4 | |
| 7 | Anna Maria Cecchi | Italy | 1:10.4 | |
| 8 | Judy Gegan | Great Britain | 1:10.5 | |

=== Final ===
| Rank | Athlete | Country | Time | Notes |
|---|---|---|---|---|
| 1 | Sharon Stouder | United States | 1:04.7 | WR |
| 2 | Ada Kok | Netherlands | 1:05.6 | |
| 3 | Kathy Ellis | United States | 1:06.0 | |
| 4 | Eila Pyrhönen | Finland | 1:07.3 | |
| 5 | Donna de Varona | United States | 1:08.0 | |
| 6 | Heike Hustede-Nagel | United Team of Germany | 1:08.5 | |
| 7 | Eiko Takahashi | Japan | 1:09.1 | |
| 8 | Mary Beth Stewart | Canada | 1:10.0 | |

Key: WR = World record
