= Yoshie =

Yoshie is both a Japanese surname and a Japanese given name. Notable people with the name include:

Family name

- Yutaka Yoshie (吉江 豊; born 1974), Japanese professional wrestler

Given name

- Yoshie Fujiwara (藤原 義江; 1898 – 1976), Japanese tenor singer
- Yoshie Hayasaka (早坂 好恵; born 1975), Japanese actress and singer
- Yoshie Kashiwabara (柏原 芳恵; born 1965), Japanese popular pop singer-songwriter and actress
- Yoshie Komori (小森 芳枝; born 1937), Japanese fencer
- Yoshie Nishioka (西岡 由恵; born 1974), Japanese former swimmer
- Yoshie Onda (恩田 美栄; born 1982), Japanese figure skater
- Yoshie Shiratori (白鳥 由栄; 1907 – 1979), Japanese fugitive
- Yoshie Taira (平 淑恵; born 1954), Japanese actress
- Yoshie Takahashi (高橋 ヨシ江; 1932–2022), Japanese long jumper
- Yoshie Takeshita (竹下 佳江; born 1978), Japanese volleyball player
- Yoshie Takeuchi (disambiguation)
  - Yoshie Takeuchi (announcer) (竹内 由恵; born 1986), Japanese freelance announcer
  - Yoshie Takeuchi (fencer) (竹内 由江; born 1932), Japanese fencer
- Yoshie Ueno (上野 順恵; born 1983), Japanese judoka
- Yoshie Wada (和田 芳恵; 1906 - 1977), Japanese novelist and critic
