= Swimming at the 1964 Summer Olympics – Women's 4 × 100 metre medley relay =

Women's 4 × 100 metre medley relay at the Games of the XVIII Olympiad
- Venue: Yoyogi National Gymnasium
- Dates: 16 October 1964 (heats); 18 October 1964 (final)
- Competitors: 43 from 9 nations
- Teams: 9
- Winning time: 4:33.9 OR

Medalists
1st place, gold medalist(s)		Cathy Ferguson, Cynthia Goyette, Sharon Stouder, Kathy Ellis, Nina Harmer*, Judy Reeder*, Susan Pitt*, Lillian Watson*	United States
2nd place, silver medalist(s)		Corrie Winkel, Klenie Bimolt, Ada Kok, Erica Terpstra, Erica Terpstra*	Netherlands
3rd place, bronze medalist(s)		Tatyana Savelyeva, Svetlana Babanina, Tatyana Devyatova, Natalya Ustinova, Nataliya Bystrova* *Indicates the swimmer only competed in the preliminary heats, but did not receive the medals.	Soviet Union

The women's 4 × 100 metre medley relay event at the 1964 Summer Olympics took place on 16 October (qualification) and 18 October (final). This swimming event uses medley swimming as a relay. Because an Olympic size swimming pool is 50 metres long, each of the four swimmers completed two lengths of the pool, each using a different stroke. The first on each team used the backstroke, the second used the breaststroke, the third used the butterfly stroke, and the final swimmer used freestyle (restricted to not allow any of the first three strokes to be used, though nearly all swimmers use front crawl regardless).

The first swimmer must touch the wall before the next can leave the starting block, and so forth; timing of the starts is thus important.

== Results ==
=== Heats ===
Heat 1

Place	Swimmers	Time	Leg 1	Leg 2	Leg 3	Leg 4
1	Tatyana Savelyeva, Svetlana Babanina, Tatyana Devyatova, Nataliya Bystrova (URS)	4:39.1	1:10.5	1:15.2	1:10.0	1:03.4
2	Satoko Tanaka, Noriko Yamamoto, Eiko Takahashi, Michiko Kihara (JPN)	4:40.6 NR	1:08.6	1:20.6	1:08.0	1:03.4
3	Corrie Winkel, Klenie Bimolt, Adrie Lasterie, and Erica Terpstra (NED)	4:44.1	1:11.5	1:18.1	1:12.4	1:02.1
4	Nanette Duncan, Marguerite Ruygrok, Linda McGill, Dawn Fraser (AUS)	4:52.3	1:13.0	1:21.9	1:16.1	1:01.3

Heat 2

Place	Swimmers	Time	Leg 1	Leg 2	Leg 3	Leg 4
1	Nina Harmer, Judy Reeder, Susan Pitt, and Lillian Watson (USA)	4:41.6	1:10.4	1:22.3	1:07.0	1:01.9
2	Ingrid Schmidt, Bärbel Grimmer, Heike Hustede, and Martina Grunert (EUA)	4:43.2	1:11.2	1:19.2	1:09.6	1:03.2
3	Jill Norfolk, Stella Mitchell, Mary Anne Cotterill, and Elizabeth Long (GBR)	4:44.3	1:10.6	1:20.0	1:10.2	1:03.5
4	Eileen Weir, Marion Lay, Mary Beth Stewart, Helen Kennedy (CAN)	4:46.6	1:10.3	1:22.9	1:09.7	1:03.7
5	Mária Balla, Zsuzsa Kovács, Márta Egerváry, and Csilla Dobai (HUN)	4:48.9	1:11.5	1:23.0	1:12.0	1:03.4

=== Final ===
Place	Swimmers	Time	Leg 1	Leg 2	Leg 3	Leg 4
1	Cathy Ferguson, Cynthia Goyette, Sharon Stouder, and Kathy Ellis (USA)	4:33.9 OR	1:08.6	1:18.3	1:06.1	1:00.9
2	Corrie Winkel, Klenie Bimolt, Ada Kok, and Erica Terpstra (NED)	4:37.0	1:12.2	1:18.5	1:05.0	1:01.3
3	Tatyana Savelyeva, Svetlana Babanina, Tatyana Devyatova, Natalya Ustinova (URS)	4:39.2	1:11.1	1:15.3	1:09.3	1:03.5
4	Satoko Tanaka, Noriko Yamamoto, Eiko Takahashi, Michiko Kihara (JPN)	4:42.0	1:09.5	1:20.5	1:09.3	1:02.7
5	Jill Norfolk, Stella Mitchell, Mary Anne Cotterill, and Elizabeth Long (GBR)	4:45.8	1:12.1	1:19.8	1:09.4	1:04.5
6	Eileen Weir, Marion Lay, Mary Beth Stewart, Helen Kennedy (CAN)	4:49.9	1:11.5	1:23.9	1:09.3	1:05.2
7	Ingrid Schmidt, Bärbel Grimmer, Heike Hustede, and Martina Grunert (EUA)	DQ				
8	Mária Balla, Zsuzsa Kovács, Márta Egerváry, and Csilla Dobai (HUN)	DQ				

Key: DQ = Disqualified, OR = Olympic record
