= Swimming at the 1964 Summer Olympics – Women's 200 metre breaststroke =

Women's 200 metre breaststroke at the Games of the XVIII Olympiad
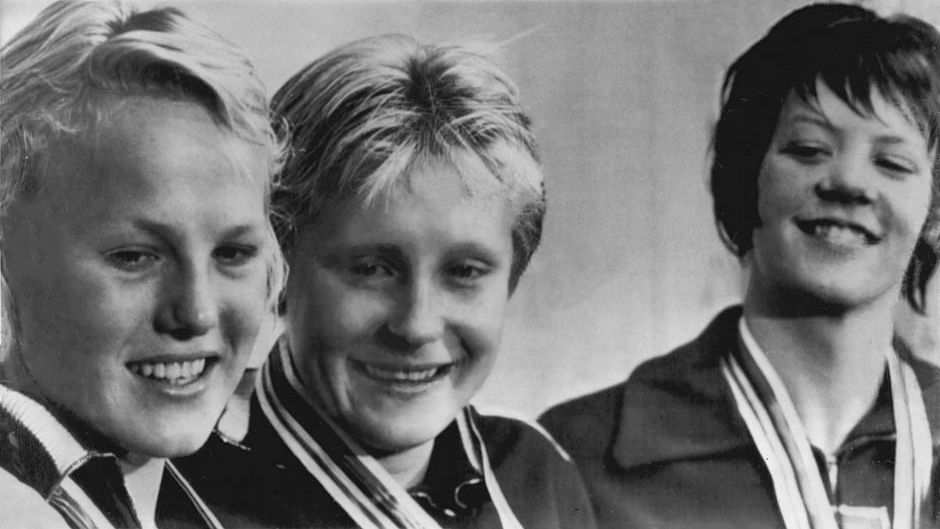
- Left-right: Babanina, Prozumenschikova, Kolb
- Venue: Yoyogi National Gymnasium
- Date: 11 October 1964 (heats); 12 October 1964 (final)
- Competitors: 27 from 15 nations
- Winning time: 2:46.4 OR

Medalists
1st place, gold medalist(s)		Galina Prozumenshchikova	Soviet Union
2nd place, silver medalist(s)		Claudia Kolb	United States
3rd place, bronze medalist(s)		Svetlana Babanina	Soviet Union

The women's 200 metre breaststroke event, included in the swimming competition at the 1964 Summer Olympics, took place on 11–12 October, at the Yoyogi National Gymnasium. In this event, swimmers covered four lengths of the 50-metre (160 ft) Olympic-sized pool employing the breaststroke. It was the ninth appearance of the event, which first appeared at the 1924 Summer Olympics in Paris. A total of 27 competitors from 15 nations participated in the event. Soviet Union's Galina Prozumenshchikova and Svetlana Babanina won their country's first medals in this event, with a gold and bronze medal respectively. 14-year-old Claudia Kolb's silver medal was the United States' second ever medal in this event, after Agnes Geraghty's silver in the inaugural event in 1924. In the heats, Australian Christine Barnetson was disqualified for an incorrect breaststroke, and Hungarian Márta Egerváry withdrew from the competition.

== Records ==
Prior to this competition, the existing world and Olympic records were:

World record	Galina Prozumenshchikova (URS)	2:45.4 s	Berlin, East Germany	17 May 1964
Olympic record	Anita Lonsbrough (GBR)	2:49.5 s	Rome, Italy	27 August 1960

The following records were established during the competition:

Date	Round	Name	Nationality	Time	OR	WR
11 October	Heat 2	Bärbel Grimmer	United Team of Germany	2:48.6	OR	
11 October	Heat 3	Svetlana Babanina	Soviet Union	2:48.3	OR	
12 October	Final	Galina Prozumenshchikova	Soviet Union	2:46.4	OR	

== Results ==
=== Heats ===
Rank	Heat	Lane	Name	Nationality	Time	Notes
1	3	1	Svetlana Babanina	Soviet Union	2:48.3	Q, OR
2	2	4	Bärbel Grimmer	United Team of Germany	2:48.6	Q, OR
3	3	7	Stella Mitchell	Great Britain	2:48.8	Q
4	2	1	Galina Prozumenshchikova	Soviet Union	2:49.0	Q
5	3	6	Claudia Kolb	United States	2:49.7	Q
6	3	3	Ursula Küper	United Team of Germany	2:50.1	Q
7	4	2	Jill Slattery	Great Britain	2:50.2	Q
8	1	1	Klenie Bimolt	Netherlands	2:50.7	Q
9	1	7	Marguerite Ruygrok	Australia	2:53.1	
10	1	6	Wiltrud Urselmann	United Team of Germany	2:53.2	
11	4	1	Vivien Haddon	New Zealand	2:53.4	
12	4	3	Truus Looijs	Netherlands	2:54.5	
13	2	7	Jacqueline Enfield	Great Britain	2:54.9	
14	1	4	Tammy Hazleton	United States	2:55.0	
15	2	5	Gretta Kok	Netherlands	2:55.4	
16	3	5	Isabel Castañe	Spain	2:55.7	
17	1	3	Noriko Yamamoto	Japan	2:57.0	
18	4	6	Sandra Nitta	United States	2:58.4	
19	4	5	Christl Filippovits	Austria	2:59.2	
20	3	4	Linda McGill	Australia	2:59.4	
21	4	7	Yoshiko Morizane	Japan	2:59.9	
22	2	6	Susana Peper	Argentina	3:00.0	
23	1	5	Zsuzsa Kovács	Hungary	3:06.7	
24	3	2	Marny Jolly	Malaysia	3:11.0	
25	1	2	Margaret Harding	Puerto Rico	3:16.0	
26	4	4	Li Hin Yu	Hong Kong	3:22.2	
27	2	3	Christine Barnetson	Australia	—	DSQ

=== Final ===
Rank	Lane	Name	Nationality	Time	Notes
1st place, gold medalist(s)	6	Galina Prozumenshchikova	Soviet Union	2:46.4	OR
2nd place, silver medalist(s)	2	Claudia Kolb	United States	2:47.6	
3rd place, bronze medalist(s)	4	Svetlana Babanina	Soviet Union	2:48.6	
4	3	Stella Mitchell	Great Britain	2:49.0	
5	1	Jill Slattery	Great Britain	2:49.6	
6	5	Bärbel Grimmer	United Team of Germany	2:51.0	
7	8	Klenie Bimolt	Netherlands	2:51.3	
8	7	Ursula Küper	United Team of Germany	2:53.9	
