= Owada =

Owada is a Japanese surname. Notable people with the surname include:

- Empress Masako of Japan (born 1963), née Owada
- Hisashi Owada (born 1932), former Japanese diplomat, judge on the International Court of Justice
- Hitomi Ōwada, Japanese voice actress
- Masashi Owada (born 1981), Japanese football player
- Mondo Owada, fictional character in the game Danganronpa: Trigger Happy Havoc
- Nana Owada (born 1999), Japanese idol
- Shinya Owada (born 1947), Japanese actor, voice actor and narrator
- Tomoko Owada (born 1941), Japanese fencer who competed at the 1964 Olympics

== See also ==
- Ōwada Station (disambiguation)
