= Jennifer Wood =

Jennifer Wood may refer to:

- Jenny Wood, swimmer who competed in the 1964 Olympics
- Jennifer Wood (gymnast), Canadian Olympic gymnast
