= Jan Turner =

Jan Turner can refer to:

- Jan Turner (runner), Bermudian runner
- Jan Turner (swimmer) (born 1944), Australian Olympic swimmer
