= Mary Tobin =

Mary Tobin may refer to:

- Mary Ann Tobin, member of the Kentucky House of Representatives
- Mary Luke Tobin (1908–2006), American Roman Catholic religious sister
- Mary Watts-Tobin (born 1936), British fencer
