= Sayed Mersal =

Egyptian boxer (1937–2022)

Personal information
- Nationality: Egyptian
- Born: 22 January 1937
- Died: March 2022 (aged 85)

Sport
- Sport: Boxing

Sayed Mersal (22 January 1937 – March 2022) was an Egyptian boxer. He competed in the men's light heavyweight event at the 1964 Summer Olympics. At the 1964 Summer Olympics, he defeated Thomas Arimi of Ghana, before losing to Alexander Nikolov of Bulgaria.
