= Klena =

Klena may refer to

- Klenät, a fried pastry common in the Nordic countries
- Derek Klena (born 1991), American actor and singer
- Klenie Bimolt (born Klena Bimolt in 1945), Dutch swimmer
