= Thomas Owens =

Thomas Owens may refer to:

- Thomas L. Owens (1897–1948), U.S. Representative from Illinois
- Thomas Owens (sailor) (born 1938), Australian former sailor
- Tom Owens (born 1949), American basketball player
