= Barnetson =

Barnetson is a surname. Notable people with the surname include:

- Christine Barnetson (1948–2019), Australian swimmer
- Jayne Barnetson (born 1968), Scottish athlete
- William Denholm Barnetson (1917–1981), Scottish newspaper and television executive
