= Helga Mees =

German fencer (1937–2014)

Personal information
- Born: 12 July 1937 Saarbrücken, Nazi Germany
- Died: 11 April 2014 (aged 76)
- Height: 1.60 m (5 ft 3 in)
- Weight: 58 kg (128 lb)

Sport
- Sport: Fencing
- Club: TBS Saarbrücken
Medal record
Representing Germany
Olympic Games
Silver medal – second place	1964 Tokyo	Individual foil
Bronze medal – third place	1964 Tokyo	Team foil
Representing West Germany
World Fencing Championships
Silver medal – second place	1958 Philadelphia	Team foil
Bronze medal – third place	1959 Budapest	Team foil

Helga Mees or Volz-Mees (12 July 1937 – 11 April 2014) was a German fencer who competed at the 1960, 1964 and 1968 Summer Olympics in the individual and team foil events. She won an individual silver and team bronze in 1964, whereas her teams finished in fourth and fifth place in 1960 and 1968, respectively. She also won two team foil medals at world championships in 1958 and 1959.
