= Kimiko Sato =

Japanese swimmer

Personal information
- Born: 6 January 1946 (age 80)

Sport
- Sport: Swimming

Kimiko Sato (佐藤 公子, Satō Kimiko; born 6 January 1946) is a Japanese former swimmer. She competed in the women's 100 metre butterfly at the 1964 Summer Olympics.
