= Firmin N'Guia =

Ivorian boxer (born 1940)

Personal information
- Nationality: Ivorian
- Born: 1 February 1940 (age 85)

Sport
- Sport: Boxing

Firmin N'Guia (born 1 February 1940) is an Ivorian boxer. He competed in the men's light heavyweight event at the 1964 Summer Olympics. At the 1964 Summer Olympics, he defeated Frederick Casey of Australia, before losing to František Poláček of Czechoslovakia.
