= Susan Pitt =

American swimmer (1948–2024)

Personal information
- Full name: Susan Kay Pitt
- National team: United States
- Born: June 18, 1948 Trenton, New Jersey, U.S.
- Died: November 22, 2024 (aged 76) Milwaukee, Wisconsin, U.S.
- Height: 5 ft 8 in (1.73 m)
- Weight: 126 lb (57 kg)

Sport
- Sport: Swimming
- Strokes: Butterfly
- Club: Summit YMCA

Susan Kay Pitt (June 18, 1948 – November 22, 2024), also known by her married name Susan Anderson, was an American competition swimmer and world record-holder. She lived with her parents Larry and Kay of Highland Park, New Jersey at the time of competition.

In 1963, Pitt was enrolled at Highland Park High School. Shortly after she turned 15, Pitt set a new world record in the 200-meter butterfly (long course) of 2:29.1 on July 27, 1963, which she held until it was eclipsed by Sharon Stouder in 1964.

As a 16-year-old, she represented the United States at the 1964 Summer Olympics in Tokyo, Japan. Pitt swam for the gold medal-winning U.S. team in the preliminary heats of the women's 4×100-meter medley relay. She was not eligible for a medal under the 1964 international swimming rules (as they do today) because she did not swim in the event final.

At the close of the 1965 school year the New Jersey High School Interscholastic Athletic Association (NJSAA), and the virtually all-male sportswriter contingent, selected Pitt as High School Athlete of the Year. She showed up to receive her award and was ushered to an outside lobby area. She received her award there, away from the spotlight enjoyed by the male athletes such as Joe Theismann who won the year before.

In 1966, Pitt began her freshman year at the University of Vermont. She retired from swimming for a year because there were no opportunities for female swimmers there. However, once she reviewed the results of the 1967 summer nationals she decided she had a chance to make the 1968 Olympic Team. Pitt transferred from Vermont to Rutgers and trained with the men's team. At 20 she became the second-oldest woman on the USA's 1968 Olympic Team and was voted team captain.

In 1973 (at age 25) Pitt set a record for the 200 Individual Medley (Long Course-Meters) at the U.S. Masters Swimming (USMS) meet on June 22 with a time of 2:50.50.

Pitt died from glioblastoma on November 22, 2024, at age 76.

== See also ==
- World record progression 200 meters butterfly
