= Natalya Ustinova =

Uzbekistani swimmer (born 1944)

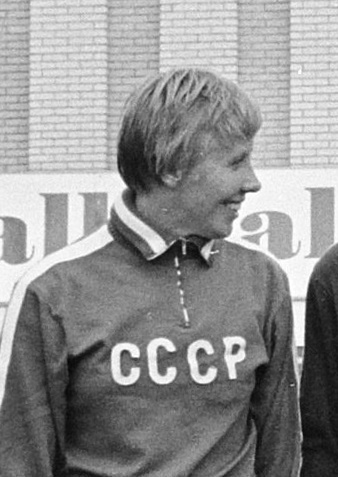
- Nataliya Ustinova in 1966

Personal information
- Born: 22 December 1944 (age 81) Tashkent, Uzbek SSR, Soviet Union
- Height: 1.65 m (5 ft 5 in)
- Weight: 58 kg (128 lb)

Sport
- Sport: Swimming
- Club: Trudovye Rezervy Tashkent
Medal record
Representing the Soviet Union
Olympic Games
Bronze medal – third place	1964 Tokyo	4×100 m medley relay
European Championships
Gold medal – first place	1966 Utrecht	4×100 m freestyle

Nataliya Andreyevna Ustinova (Russian: Наталья Андреевна Устинова; born 22 December 1944) is an Uzbekistani former swimmer. She competed at the 1964 and 1968 Summer Olympics in the individual 100 m freestyle and 4 × 100 m relays and won a bronze medal in 1964 in the 4 × 100 m medley relay. She was part of the Soviet team that won the 4 × 100 m freestyle relay at the 1966 European Aquatics Championships, setting a new European record. Between 1962 and 1968 she collected 16 national titles in the 100 m and 200 m freestyle and in relays.
