= María Ballesté =

Spanish swimmer

Personal information
- Full name: María Asunción Ballesté Huguet
- Born: 12 December 1947 (age 78) Barcelona, Spain

Sport
- Sport: Swimming

María Asunción Ballesté Huguet (born 12 December 1947) is a Spanish former swimmer. She competed in the women's 100 metre butterfly at the 1964 Summer Olympics.
