= Li Hin Yu =

Hong Kong swimmer (born 1948)

Personal information
- Born: 4 January 1948 (age 78)

Sport
- Sport: Swimming

Li Hin Yu (born 4 January 1948) is a Hong Kong former swimmer. She competed in the women's 200 metre breaststroke at the 1964 Summer Olympics.
