= Tatyana Savelyeva =

Russian backstroke swimmer

Personal information
- Native name: Татьяна Андреевна Савельева
- Born: 22 May 1947 (age 79) Leningrad, Russian SFSR, Soviet Union
- Height: 1.64 m (5 ft 5 in)
- Weight: 57 kg (126 lb)

Sport
- Sport: Swimming
- Club: Dynamo St. Petersburg
Medal record
Representing Soviet Union
Summer Olympics
Bronze medal – third place	1964 Tokyo	4×100 m medley

Tatyana Andreyevna Savelyeva (Russian: Татьяна Андреевна Савельева; born 22 May 1947) is a retired Russian backstroke swimmer. She competed in four events at the 1964 and 1968 Summer Olympics and won a bronze medal in the 4 × 100 m medley relay in 1964; in other events she did not reach the finals. During her career she set six national records and won five national titles in the 100 m (1964–1966) and 200 m backstroke (1967–1968).

She graduated from the Saint Petersburg State Polytechnical University. After marriage she changed her last name to Gladysheva (Russian: Гладышева).
