= Hiroko Saito =

Japanese swimmer

Personal information
- Born: 18 January 1945 (age 81)

Sport
- Sport: Swimming

Hiroko Saito (斎藤 弘子, Saitō Hiroko; born 18 January 1945) is a Japanese former swimmer. She competed in the women's 100 metre butterfly at the 1964 Summer Olympics.
