= Marianne Humeniuk =

Canadian swimmer

Personal information
- Born: 14 October 1947
- Died: 19 November 2014 (aged 67)

Sport
- Sport: Swimming

Marianne Humeniuk (14 October 1947 – 19 November 2014) was a Canadian swimmer. She competed in the women's 100 metre butterfly at the 1964 Summer Olympics.
