= Tammy Hazleton =

American swimmer (born 1947)

Personal information
- Full name: Tamara Anne Hazleton
- Nickname: "Tammy"
- National team: United States
- Born: December 1, 1947 (age 78) Providence, Rhode Island, U.S.
- Occupation: Swim Coach
- Height: 5 ft 10 in (1.78 m)
- Weight: 150 lb (68 kg)
- Spouse: Owen Patrick Murphy

Sport
- Sport: Swimming
- Event: 100, 200 meter breaststroke
- Strokes: Breaststroke
- Club: Northern Virginia Athletic Club
- College team: University of Tampa
- Coach: Stan Tinkham (Northern Virginia); Peter Daland (Olympics)

Tamara Anne Hazleton (born December 1, 1947) is an American former competition swimmer who competed for the Northern Virginia Athletic Club and represented the United States in the 200-meter breaststroke as a 16-year-old at the 1964 Summer Olympics in Tokyo, Japan.

== Early life ==
Hazleton was born December 1, 1947 in Providence, Rhode Island. She attended Maryland's Montgomery Blair High School in Silver Springs, and as a late starter began serious training at 14 with the Northern Virginia Athletic Club in Arlington, Virginia, under founder and long serving Head Coach Stanley Tinkham, the women's 1956 Olympic Head Coach. Tinkham was particularly skilled in teaching technique and training breaststroke swimmers. Tammy's other athletic interests included sailing, horseback riding, tennis, golf, and scuba diving.

In the September, 1964 U.S. Olympic swimming trials in Astoria, New York, Hazleton finished second in the 200-meter breaststroke with a time of 2:53.3, qualifying for the 1964 U.S. women's Olympic team. She was just a yard behind 14-year-old record holder Claudia Kolb who placed first with a time of 2:51.9.

== 1964 Tokyo Olympics ==
Managed by U.S. Olympic Women's Head Coach Peter Daland, at only sixteen Hazleton competed in the preliminary heats of the women's 200-meter breaststroke at the 1964 Tokyo Olympics and recorded a time of 2:55.0, finishing fourteenth overall, and was eliminated from advancing to the finals. Her time was a full six seconds behind contending for the bronze medal. In a highly competitive field, Galina Prozumenschchikova of Russia took the gold medal with a time of 2:46.4, American rival Claudia Kolb took the silver with a time of 2:47.6, a major improvement over her time in the U.S. trials, and Russian Svetlana Babanina took the bronze with a time of 2:48.6.

In the Fall of 1965, Tammy swam briefly for University of Tampa with Northern Virginia Athletic Club teammate Patti Rimm. In 1964, Tammy won the District Championships in the 100 and 200-meter breaststroke events. In 1964 she set the 100-meter District and age-group National Championship at the Eastern Championships. Taking an early interest in coaching, while in college in Tampa, she spent weekends coaching locally.

Subsequent to the 1964 Olympics, her last meet was at the 1965 Eastern Championships while still representing the Northern Virginia Athletic Club.

Hazleton married Owen Patrick Murphy after the 1964 Olympics. After a long break from competitive swimming, hoping for a comeback, she trained with the Bucknell Swim team in Lewisberg, Pennsylvania, and then George Breen's Vesper Boat Club in greater Philadelphia twice a day to try to qualify for the 1972 Munich Olympics. At the August 1971 Eastern Championships, she won the 100-meter breaststroke with a time of 1:10.5, a personal best. She did not qualify for the 1972 Olympic trials, however. Hazleton competed at the 1972 Middle Atlantic AAU American Coaches Association Championship in Hershey Pennsylvania in August, 1972.

Hazleton later worked as a swim coach.
