= Yoshie Takeuchi =

Yoshie Takeuchi may refer to:

- Yoshie Takeuchi (announcer) (born 1986), Japanese TV announcer
- Yoshie Takeuchi (fencer) (born 1932), Japanese Olympic fencer
