= Robert Christopherson =

American Olympian boxer (1936–2026)

Robert H. Christopherson
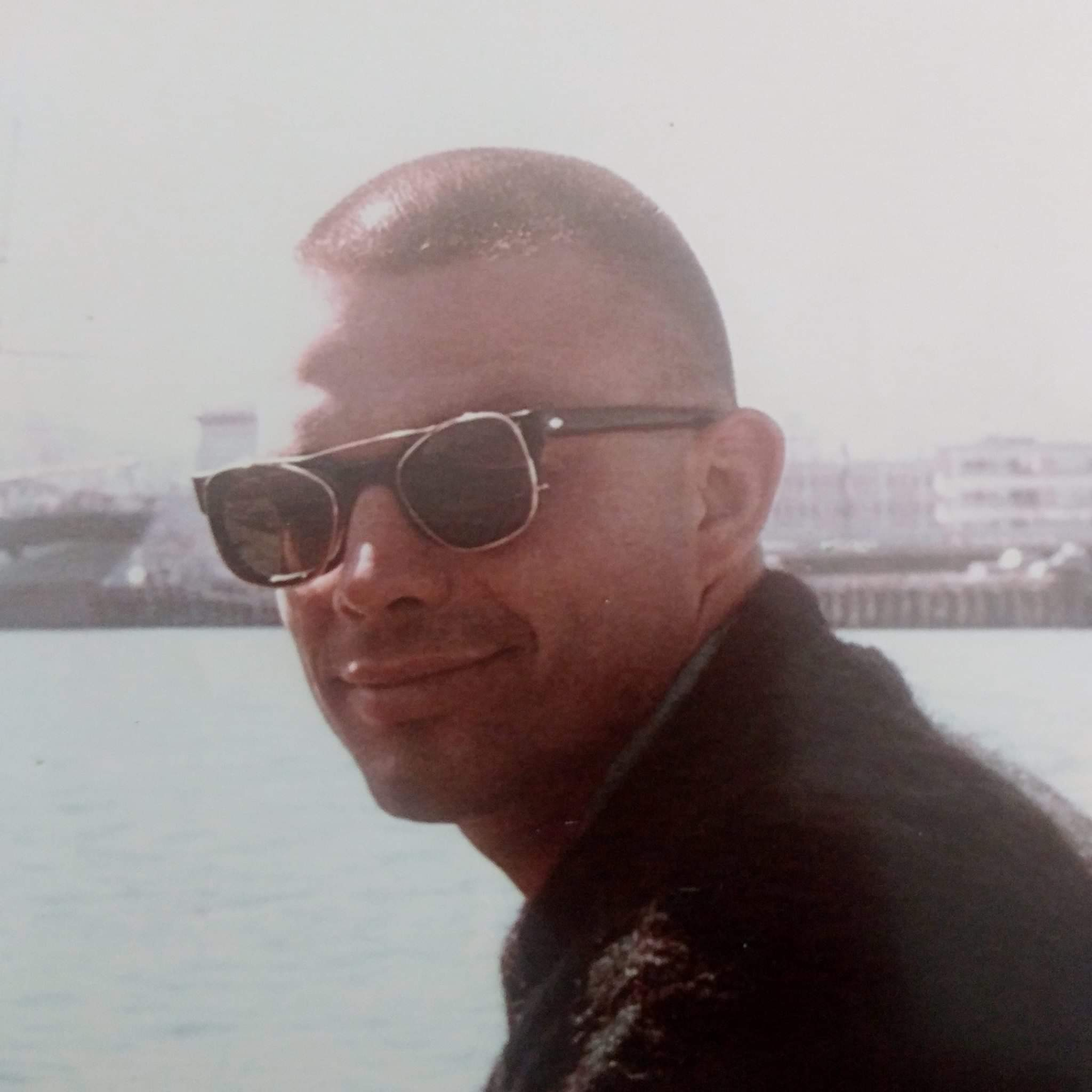
- San Francisco, CA, 1963

Personal information
- Full name: Robert Henry Christopherson
- Nationality: American
- Born: October 7, 1936 Finlayson, Minnesota, U.S.
- Died: October 18, 2026 (aged 90) Albuquerque, New Mexico, U.S.

Sport
- Sport: Boxing

Robert Henry Christopherson (October 7, 1936 – October 18, 2026) was an American amateur boxer. He competed in the men's light heavyweight event at the 1964 Summer Olympics. He and Joe Frazier were roommates during the Olympics in Tokyo, Japan.

At the 1964 Summer Olympics, he defeated Barkat Ali of Pakistan in Round 32, before losing to Aleksei Kiselyov of the Soviet Union in Round 16 by referee decision. His teammate on the 1964 US Boxing Team, Joe Frazier, went on to win the only 1964 Summer Olympic boxing gold medal for the United States.

== Life after the Olympics ==
Christopherson served in the U.S. Marine Corps Reserves from 1959 to 1965 while serving active duty in the U.S. Air Force from 1961 to 1965.

He married in 1965 to Ursula J. Colbourne. He and his wife had three daughters, Lisa, Cheryl (Sara), and Janice (Lindsey). He graduated from the University of Wisconsin with a bachelor's of science in social work. He obtained a master's of social work (MSW) degree from New Mexico Highlands University located in Las Vegas, New Mexico.

Robert Christopherson died in Albuquerque, New Mexico, on October 18, 2026, at the age of 90.
