= Marny Jolly =

Malaysian swimmer

Personal information
- Born: 4 February 1948 (age 78) Australia

Sport
- Sport: Swimming

Marny Jolly (born 4 February 1948) is a Malaysian former swimmer. She competed in the women's 200 metre breaststroke at the 1964 Summer Olympics. She was the first woman to represent Malaysia at the Olympics.
