= Lyudmila Shishova =

Soviet fencer (1940–2004)

Personal information
- Born: 1 June 1940 Nizhny Novgorod, Russian SFSR, Soviet Union
- Died: 21 February 2004 (aged 63) Nizhny Novgorod, Russia
- Height: 1.58 m (5 ft 2 in)
- Weight: 54 kg (119 lb)

Sport
- Sport: Fencing
- Club: Spartak Gorky
Medal record
Women's fencing
Representing Soviet Union
Olympic Games
Gold medal – first place	1960 Rome	Foil, women's team
Silver medal – second place	1964 Tokyo	Foil, women's team

Lyudmila Shishova (Russian: Людмила Николаевна Шишова; 1 June 1940 – 21 February 2004) was a Soviet fencer and fencing coach. She won gold in the team foil at the 1960 Summer Olympics and a silver in the same event at the 1964 Summer Olympics.

Shishova tried several sports before coming to a fencing school in 1954. From 1960 to 1964 she was a member of the Soviet foil team. In 1969 she received a degree in gynecology from the Nizhny Novgorod State Medical Academy, and after retiring from competitions worked both as a gynecologist and a fencing coach. Her husband, Vitaly Zinkov, and daughter Elvira Zinkova, both competed at the national level in fencing.
