= Judy Reeder =

American former competition swimmer (born 1948)

Personal information
- Full name: Judith Anne Reeder
- Nickname: "Judy"
- National team: United States
- Born: August 17, 1948 (age 77) Pueblo, Colorado, U.S.
- Height: 5 ft 9 in (1.75 m)
- Weight: 126 lb (57 kg)

Sport
- Sport: Swimming
- Strokes: Breaststroke
- Club: Santa Clara Swim Club
- Coach: George Haines (Santa Clara)

Judith Anne Reeder (born August 17, 1948) is an American former competition swimmer and 1964 Olympic participant. She briefly held the American record in the women's 100-meter breaststroke with a time of 1:20.1 which she set at the 1964 Olympic Trials in Astoria, New York.

Reeder was born in Pueblo, Colorado on August 17, 1948. She attended Santa Clara High School and by the age of 14, trained with the Santa Clara Swim Club in Santa Clara, California, under coach George Haines. At 14, swimming for the Santa Clara Club, she qualified for the Junior Olympics in the 200 breaststroke. At the Far Western Swim Championships on August 25, 1962, she placed third in the 200 meter breaststroke with a time of 3:08.8 and placed first in the 100-meter breaststroke with a 1:24.8.

== 1964 Tokyo Olympics ==
At the 1964 Olympic trials in Astoria, New York in early September, Reeder swam a new American record time of 1:20.1, in the 100-meter breaststroke final, placing first in the event and qualifying for the team. Cynthia Goyette, who placed second, also qualified for the medley relay with Judy.

As a 16-year-old, Reeder represented the United States at the 1964 Summer Olympics in Tokyo. She swam the breaststroke leg for the gold medal-winning U.S. team in the preliminary heats of the women's 4×100-meter medley relay on June 16, 1964. In her preliminary heat of the 4x100 medley she swam with Nina Harmer who did the backstroke leg, Sue Pitt (Anderson) who did the butterfly leg, and Lillian Watson who anchored the freestyle leg. They swam their preliminary heat in 4:41.60, the fastest time for the second preliminary heat, though slower than the times of the first preliminary heat. Though they won their heat, and allowed the American team to advance, they did not swim in the finals. Under the 1964 international swimming rules, only those relay swimmers who competed in the event final were eligible to receive medals.

Reeder was one of five young women swimmers on the Santa Clara club that qualified for the 1964 U.S. Olympic team, that included Donna de Varona, Terri Stickles, Pokey Watson, and Claudia Kolb. Olympians Donna de Varona, Terri Stickles, and Claudia Kolb, also attended Santa Clara High School with Judy. Santa Clara's Coach George Haines served as an Assistant Olympic Coach for the U.S. men's team at the 1964 Tokyo Olympics and had served as the Head Coach for the Women's team in at the 1960 Olympics.
