= Boxing at the 1964 Summer Olympics – Light heavyweight =

Boxing competitions

The light heavyweight class in the boxing at the 1964 Summer Olympics competition was the second-heaviest class. Light heavyweights were limited to those boxers weighing less than 81 kilograms. 19 boxers from 19 nations competed.

== Medalists ==
Gold	Cosimo Pinto; Italy
Silver	Aleksei Kiselyov; Soviet Union
Bronze	Alexander Nikolov; Bulgaria
Bronze	Zbigniew Pietrzykowski; Poland

== Results ==
Round of 32; 14 October
Nguia (CIV)	3
Casey (AUS)	2
Christopherson (USA)	5
Ali (PAK)	0
Negrea (ROU)	0
Kiselyov (URS)	5

Round of 16; 17 October
Schlegel (EUA)	5
Mugwanya (UGA)	0
Lubbers (NED)	0
Pinto (ITA)	5
Nicolov (BUL)	W
Thebault (FRA)	RSC
Mersal (EGY)	5
Arimi (GHA)	0
Gargiulo (ARG)	5
Horvath (SUI)	0
Pietrzykowski (POL)	W
Holmes (JAM)	DQ
Polacek (TCH)	W
Nguia (CIV)	RSC
Christopherson (USA)	0
Kiselyov (URS)	5

Quarterfinals; 19 October
Schlegel (EUA)	1
Pinto (ITA)	4
Nicolov (BUL)	5
Mersal (EGY)	0
Gargiulo (ARG)	0
Pietrzykowski (POL)	5
Polacek (TCH)	0
Kiselyov (URS)	5

Semifinals; 21 October
Pinto (ITA)	W
Nicolov (BUL) (bronze)	RSC
Pietrzykowski (POL) (bronze)	1
Kiselyov (URS)	4

Final; 23 October
Pinto (ITA) (gold)	3
Kiselyov (URS) (silver)	2

== Sources ==
Tokyo Organizing Committee (1964). The Games of the XVIII Olympiad: Tokyo 1964, vol. 2.
