= Nataliya Bystrova =

Soviet swimmer

Personal information
- Born: 23 June 1947 (age 79)
- Height: 1.75 m (5 ft 9 in)
- Weight: 67 kg (148 lb)

Sport
- Sport: Swimming
- Club: Dynamo Moscow
Medal record
Representing Soviet Union
Summer Olympics
Bronze medal – third place	1964 Tokyo	4×100 m medley

Nataliya Bystrova (Russian: Наталья Быстрова; born 23 June 1947) is a retired Soviet freestyle swimmer who won a bronze medal in the 4 × 100 m medley relay at the 1964 Summer Olympics. She swam in the preliminary round, in which the Soviet team clocked the fastest time and set a new Olympic record. This record was broken in the final by the American and Dutch teams. During her senior career she won two national titles, in 1966 and 1969.

After marriage she changed her last name to Chirkova (Russian: Чиркова). Since 1989, when masters competitions had been introduced in the Soviet Union, she competed in this category and won 30 national titles, 7 in Soviet Union (1989–1991) and 23 in Russia (1993–2010), and set 27 national records in individual events. In 1990 she won a bronze medal in the 100 m freestyle at the world championships.
