= Gerard Tubier =

Australian fencer

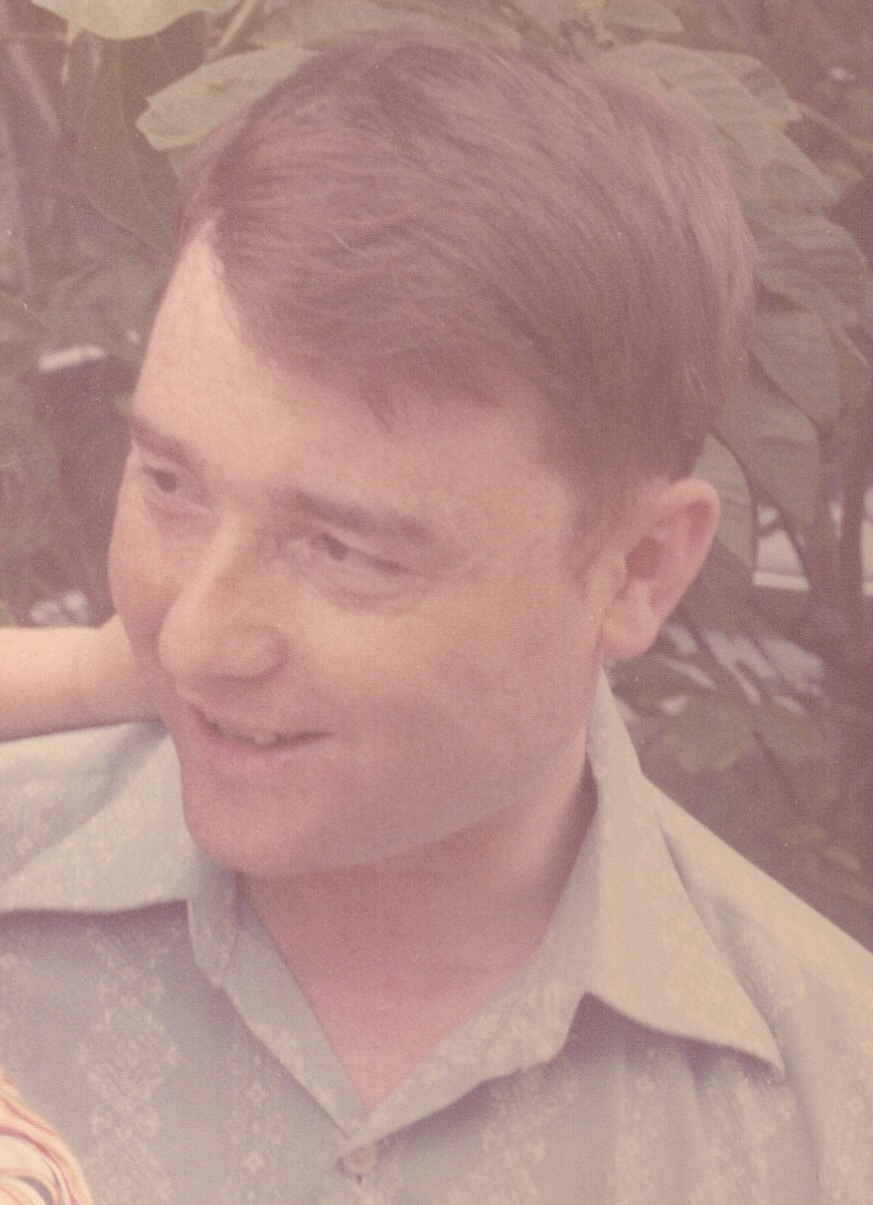
- Gerard Tubier in 1973

Personal information
- Born: 26 October 1938 (age 87)

Sport
- Sport: Fencing

Gerard Tubier (born 26 October 1938) is an Australian fencer. He competed in the team foil event at the 1964 Summer Olympics.
