= Gillian de Greenlaw =

Australian swimmer

Personal information
- Born: 21 June 1950 (age 76)

Sport
- Sport: Swimming
- Strokes: butterfly

Gillian de Greenlaw (born 21 June 1950) is an Australian former swimmer. She competed in the women's 100 metre butterfly at the 1964 Summer Olympics.
