= Ian Quartermain =

Australian sailor (born 1940)

Ian Myron Quartermain (born 30 December 1940), is an Australian former sailor who competed in the 1964 Summer Olympics.
