= Scott Davie (basketball) =

Australian basketball player

Personal information
- Nationality: Australian
- Born: 15 February 1940 (age 85); Adelaide, Australia

Sport
- Sport: Basketball

Theodore L. S. "Scott" Davie (born 15 February 1940) is an Australian former basketball player. He competed in the men's tournament at the 1964 Summer Olympics.
