= Werner Linde =

Australian basketball player

Personal information
- Nationality: Australian
- Born: 13 October 1944 (age 80)

Sport
- Sport: Basketball

Werner Rudolph Linde (born 13 October 1944) is an Australian former basketball player. He competed in the men's tournament at the 1964 Summer Olympics.
