= Sin Gwang-suk =

South Korean fencer

Personal information
- Born: 8 November 1946 (age 79)
- Education: Ewha Girls' High School; Ewha Womans University

Sport
- Sport: Fencing

Korean name
- Hangul: 신광숙
- Hanja: 申光淑
- RR: Sin Gwangsuk
- MR: Sin Kwangsuk

Sin Gwang-suk (born 8 November 1946) is a South Korean fencer. She competed in the women's individual foil event at the 1964 Summer Olympics.
