= Valentina Yakovleva =

Soviet swimmer

Personal information
- Born: 18 January 1947 (age 79) Lviv, Ukraine
- Height: 1.63 m (5 ft 4 in)
- Weight: 66 kg (146 lb)

Sport
- Sport: Swimming
- Club: Dynamo Lviv

Valentina Yakovleva (Russian: Валентина Яковлева; born 18 January 1947) is a Soviet swimmer. She competed at the 1964 Summer Olympics in the 100 m butterfly event, but did not reach the final. Between 1963 and 1965 she won two national titles and set seven national records in butterfly and medley disciplines.

After marriage she changed her last name to Rakaeva (Russian: Ракаева). She works as a swimming coach at a Moscow sports school; she is also a swimming referee.
