= Natalina Sanguinetti =

Italian fencer (born 1940)

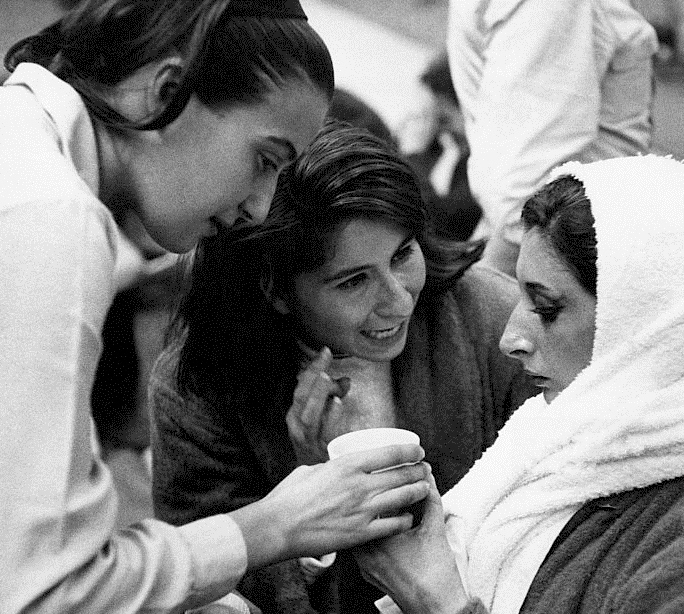
- Natalina Sanguinetti (left), Giovanna Masciotta and Antonella Ragno at the 1964 Olympics

Personal information
- Born: 25 December 1940 (age 85) Genoa, Italy
- Height: 1.65 m (5 ft 5 in)
- Weight: 61 kg (134 lb)

Sport
- Sport: Fencing
- Club: Club Scherma Torino

Natalina Sanguinetti (born 25 December 1940) is a retired Italian fencer. She competed in the team foil event at the 1964 Summer Olympics and finished in fourth place.
