= John Douglas (fencer) =

Australian fencer

Personal information
- Born: 7 May 1943 (age 83)

Sport
- Sport: Fencing

John Douglas (born 7 May 1943) is an Australian fencer. He competed in the team foil event at the 1964 Summer Olympics.
