= Bill Wyatt =

Australian basketball player

Personal information
- Nationality: Australian
- Born: 27 July 1938 (age 86)

Sport
- Sport: Basketball

William George Wyatt (born 27 July 1938) is an Australian former basketball player. He competed in the men's tournament at the 1964 Summer Olympics and the 1972 Summer Olympics.
