= Tatyana Devyatova =

Ukrainian swimmer (born 1948)

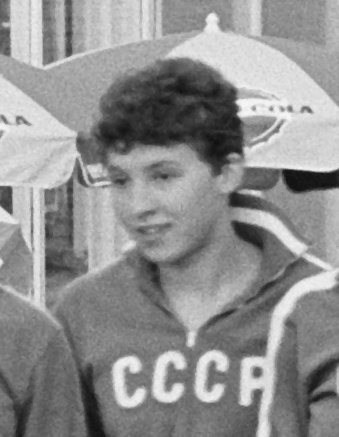
- Tatyana Devyatova in 1966

Personal information
- Born: 19 September 1948 (age 77) Kupyansk, Ukrainian SSR, Soviet Union
- Height: 1.66 m (5 ft 5 in)
- Weight: 61 kg (134 lb)

Sport
- Sport: Swimming
- Club: Dynamo Kharkiv
Medal record
Representing the Soviet Union
Olympic Games
Bronze medal – third place	1964 Tokyo	4×100 m medley relay
European Championships
Silver medal – second place	1966 Utrecht	4×100 m medley

Tatyana Nikolaevna Devyatova (Russian: Татьяна Николаевна Девятова, Ukrainian: Тетяна Миколаївна Девятова (Костіцина); born 19 September 1948) is a Ukrainian former swimmer. She competed at the 1964 and 1968 Summer Olympics in individual butterfly and 4 × 100 m medley events. She finished in third and fourth place, respectively, in the relay, whereas individually she failed to reach the finals. She won a silver medal in the 4 × 100 m medley relay at the 1966 European Aquatics Championships and finished fourth in the 100 m butterfly.

After marriage she changed her last name to Kostitsyna (Russian: Костицина, Ukrainian: Костіцина).
