= Alexander Nikolov (boxer) =

Bulgarian boxer (born 1940)

Medal record

Men's Boxing

Representing Bulgaria

Olympic Games
Bronze medal – third place	1964 Tokyo	Light-heavyweight

Alexander Nikolov (Bulgarian: Александър Николов; born 4 March 1940) is a boxer from Bulgaria. He competed for Bulgaria in the 1964 Summer Olympics held in Tokyo, Japan in the light-heavyweight event where he finished in third place.

== 1964 Olympic results ==
Below is the record of Alexander Nikolov, a Bulgarian light heavyweight boxer who competed at the 1964 Tokyo Olympics:

- Round of 32: bye
- Round of 16: defeated Bernard Thebault (France) referee stopped contest
- Quarterfinal: defeated Sayed Mersal (Egypt) by decision, 5-0
- Semifinal: lost to Cosimo Pinto (Italy) referee stopped contest
