= Paul Rizzuto =

Australian fencer

Personal information
- Born: 14 September 1936 (age 89)

Sport
- Sport: Fencing

Paul Rizzuto (born 14 September 1936) is an Australian fencer. He competed in the team sabre event at the 1964 Summer Olympics.
