= Frederick Casey =

Australian boxer

Personal information
- Nationality: Australian
- Born: 10 February 1942 (age 83); Sydney, Australia

Sport
- Sport: Boxing

Frederick Casey (born 10 February 1942) is an Australian boxer. He competed in the men's light heavyweight event at the 1964 Summer Olympics. At the 1964 Summer Olympics, he lost to Firmin N'Guia of the Ivory Coast.
