= María Romano =

Argentine fencer

Personal information
- Born: 28 November 1931 (age 94)

Sport
- Sport: Fencing

María Romano (born 28 November 1931) is an Argentine fencer. She competed in the women's individual foil event at the 1964 Summer Olympics.
