= Corrie Winkel =

Dutch swimmer

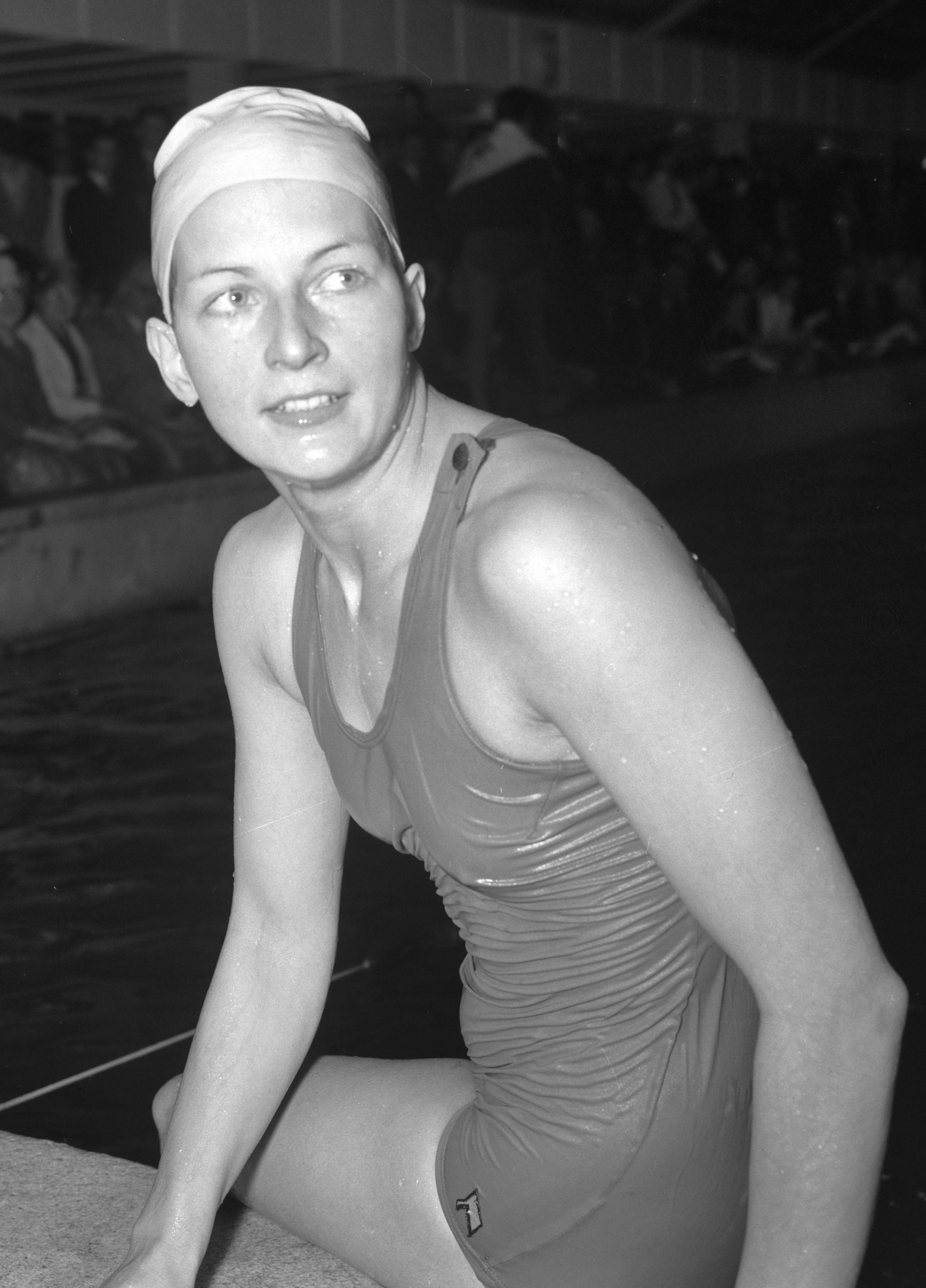
- Corrie Winkel in 1962

Personal information
- Born: 26 February 1944 (age 82) Groningen, Netherlands
- Height: 1.70 m (5 ft 7 in)
- Weight: 64 kg (141 lb)

Sport
- Sport: Swimming
- Club: GDZ, Groningen
Medal record
Representing the Netherlands
Olympic Games
Silver medal – second place	1964 Tokyo	4×100 m Medley Relay
European Championships
Silver medal – second place	1962 Leipzig	100 m backstroke

Kornelia "Corrie" Winkel (born 26 February 1944) is a former backstroke swimmer from the Netherlands. She finished second in the 100 m backstroke at the 1962 European Aquatics Championships. Two years later she who won the silver medal in the 4×100 m medley relay at the 1964 Summer Olympics. At the same Olympics she finished in 14th position in the individual 100 m backstroke. Between 1962 and 1964 she set eight national and two European records in the 100 m and 200 m backstroke and 4 × 100 m medley events.
