= Russell Phegan =

Australian swimmer

Personal information
- Born: 15 February 1947 (age 79) Queensland, Australia

Sport
- Sport: Swimming
- Strokes: freestyle

Russell Phegan (born 15 February 1947) is an Australian former swimmer. He competed in two events at the 1964 Summer Olympics.
