= Ginette Rossini =

Luxembourgish fencer (born 1939)

Personal information
- Born: 26 October 1939 (age 86) Esch-sur-Alzette, Luxembourg

Sport
- Sport: Fencing

Ginette Rossini (born 26 October 1939) is a Luxembourgish fencer. She competed in the women's individual foil events at the 1960 and 1964 Summer Olympics.
