= Peter Tonkin =

Australian swimmer

Personal information
- Nationality: Australian
- Born: 21 May 1948 (age 78)

Sport
- Sport: Swimming
- Strokes: Breaststroke

Peter Tonkin (born 21 May 1948) is an Australian former swimmer. He competed in two events at the 1964 Summer Olympics.
