= Katalin Juhász =

Hungarian fencer (born 1932)

Personal information
- Born: 24 November 1932 (age 93) Hódmezővásárhely, Hungary

Sport
- Sport: Fencing
Medal record
Women's fencing
Representing Hungary
Silver medal – second place	1960 Rome	Foil team
Gold medal – first place	1964 Tokyo	Foil team
World Championships
Gold medal – first place	1959 Budapest	Foil team
Gold medal – first place	1962 Buenos Aires	Foil team
Gold medal – first place	1967 Montreal	Foil team
Silver medal – second place	1961 Turin	Foil team
Silver medal – second place	1962 Gdańsk	Foil team
Bronze medal – third place	1962 Buenos Aires	Foil individual
Bronze medal – third place	1963 Gdańsk	Foil individual

Katalin Juhász (Hungarian: Juhász Katalin, Tóth Gézáné, born Juhász Katalin; born 24 November 1932) was a Hungarian foil fencer.

From 1947, she was the fencer of Szegedi Postás, from 1950 the fencer of Szegedi Haladás, from 1957 she played in OSC (Orvosegyetemi Sport Club, Sport Club of the University of Medicine). From 1957 to 1967, she was a member of the Olympic team of Hungary. During her career, she won two Olympic and seven world championship medals. She stopped active sport in 1967.

In 1956, she graduated with a diploma in Chemistry from the University of Szeged. After leaving sport, she became a development engineer of the Accumulator Factory (Akkumulátorgyár) in Budapest. She is retired from 1987.

== Results ==
- Olympic champion:
  - 1964, Tokyo: foil team (Judit Ágoston, Lídia Dömölky, Paula Marosi, Ildikó Rejtő)
- Olympics, 2nd place:
  - 1960, Rome: foil team (Lídia Dömölky, Magda Nyári, Ildikó Rejtő, Györgyi Marvalits)
- Olympics, 5th place:
  - 1964, Tokyo: foil individual
- World champion:
  - 1959, Budapest: foil team (Dömölky Lídia, Zsuzsa Morvay, Magda Nyári, Ildikó Rejtő, Györgyi Marvalits)
  - 1962, Buenos Aires: foil team (Mária Gulácsy, Paula Marosi, Magda Nyári, Ildikó Rejtő)
  - 1967, Montreal: foil team (Ildikó Bóbis, Lídia Dömölky, Mária Gulácsy, Ildikó Rejtő)
- Second place on world championships:
  - 1961, Turin: foil team (Judit Ágoston, Lídia Dömölky, Magda Nyári, Ildikó Rejtő, Györgyi Marvalits)
  - 1963, Gdańsk: foil team (Lídia Dömölky, Paula Marosi, Magda Nyári, Ildikó Rejtő, Katalin Szalontay)
- Third place on world championships:
  - 1962, Buenos Aires: foil individual
  - 1963, Gdańsk: foil individual
- Fourth place on world championships:
  - 1958, Philadelphia: foil team (Lídia Dömölky, Magda Nyári, Ildikó Rejtő)
- Fifth place on world championships:
  - 1959, Budapest: foil individual
- Sixth place on world championships:
  - 1961, Turin: foil individual
- Winner of the Universiade:
  - 1957, Paris: foil team (Judit Ágoston, Vera Kelemen, Zsuzsa Morvay)
- Second place on the Universiade:
  - 1957, Paris: foil individual

== Sources ==
- László Havas: A magyar sport aranykönyve – Budapest, 1982 – ISBN 963-253-572-3
- Endre Kahlich – László Gy. Papp – Zoltán Subert: Olimpiai játékok 1896–1976 – Budapest, 1977 – ISBN 963-253-526-X
- Révai új lexikona X. (Hom–Kac). Editor István Tarsoly. Szekszárd: Babits. 2002. ISBN 963-9272-80-9
- Miklós Bocsák: Hogyan élnek olimpiai bajnokaink (166-an szerte a világban) – St. plusz kft., 1998 – (without ISBN)
- László Lukács – György Szepesi: 112. A magyar olimpiai aranyérmek története – Budapest, 1980 – ISBN 963-253-553-7
