= Eila Pyrhönen =

Finnish swimmer (born 1945)

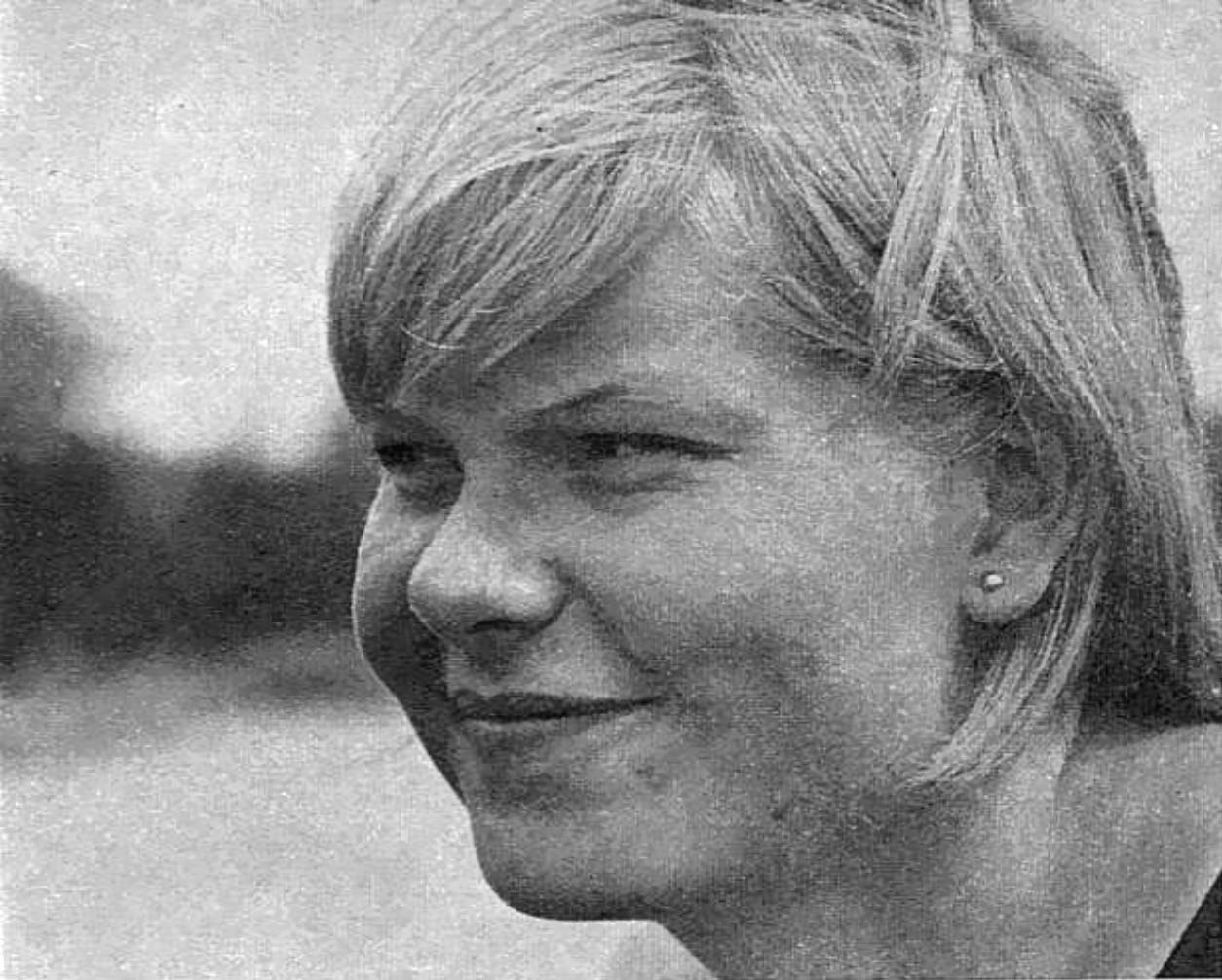
- Pyrhönen in 1964

Personal information
- Born: 25 October 1945 (age 80) Helsinki, Finland
- Height: 1.78 m (5 ft 10 in)
- Weight: 74 kg (163 lb)

Sport
- Sport: Swimming
- Club: Marjaniemen Uimarit, Helsinki
Medal record
Women's swimming
Representing Finland
European Championships
Bronze medal – third place	1966 Utrecht	100 m butterfly

Eila Marjatta "Ellu" Pyrhönen (born 25 October 1945) is a retired Finnish swimmer who won a bronze medal in the 100 m butterfly at the 1966 European Aquatics Championships. She finished fourth in the same event at the 1964 Summer Olympics, becoming the first Finnish woman to reach Olympic finals in swimming.

In 1966, she was selected as the Finnish Sports Personality of the Year and in 2002 received the Finnish Pro Urheilu Sports Award.
