= Martinus Visser =

Australian sailor

Martinus Wiendelt Visser (28 December 1924 – 10 August 2008) was an Australian sailor who competed in the 1964 Summer Olympics.
