= Imants Terrauds =

Australian fencer

Personal information
- Nationality: Australian
- Born: 27 July 1936 (age 89)
- Height: 174 cm (5 ft 9 in)
- Weight: 66 kg (146 lb)

Sport
- Sport: Fencing

Imants Terrauds (born 27 July 1936) is an Australian fencer. He competed in the team épée event at the 1964 Summer Olympics.
