= Ian Bowditch =

Australian fencer

Personal information
- Born: 9 March 1939
- Died: 25 February 2008 (aged 68)

Sport
- Sport: Fencing

Ian Bowditch (9 March 1939 – 25 February 2008) was an Australian fencer. He competed in the team épée event at the 1964 Summer Olympics. Before this, Ian and his brother Bruce were both awarded full blues for fencing as members of the Melbourne University Fencing Club.

Bowditch, who trained as a lawyer, helped draft the Constitution of Nauru while working as an Australian Government Legal Officer prior to Nauru's independence. He later practiced as a barrister at the Victorian Bar for over 25 years (signing the Victorian Bar Roll on 24 November 1983 and retiring in 2003).

He was the father of singer Clare Bowditch.
