= Ōwada Station =

Ōwada Station is the name of multiple train stations in Japan:

- Ōwada Station (Hokkaido) (大和田駅)
- Ōwada Station (Nara) (大輪田駅)
- Ōwada Station (Osaka) (大和田駅)
- Ōwada Station (Saitama) (大和田駅)
- Keisei-Ōwada Station (京成大和田駅)
