= Jenny Wood =

Rhodesian swimmer (born 1948)

Personal information
- Born: 24 June 1948 (age 78)

Sport
- Sport: Swimming

Jenny Wood (born 24 June 1948) is a Rhodesian former swimmer. She competed in the women's 100 metre butterfly at the 1964 Summer Olympics, where she was eliminated in the heats.
