= John Heard (basketball) =

Australian basketball player (born 1939)

Personal information
- Nationality: Australian
- Born: 11 February 1939 (age 87) Adelaide, South Australia, Australia

Sport
- Sport: Basketball

John Alastair Heard (born 11 February 1939) is an Australian former basketball player. He competed in the men's tournament at the 1964 Summer Olympics.
