= Mireya Rodríguez =

Cuban fencer (1936–2007)

Personal information
- Born: 26 November 1936 Havana, Cuba
- Died: 10 July 2007 (aged 70) Havana, Cuba

Sport
- Sport: Fencing

Mireya Rodríguez (26 November 1936 – 10 July 2007) was a Cuban fencer. She competed in the women's individual foil event at the 1964 Summer Olympics.
