= Klenie Bimolt =

Dutch swimmer (born 1945)

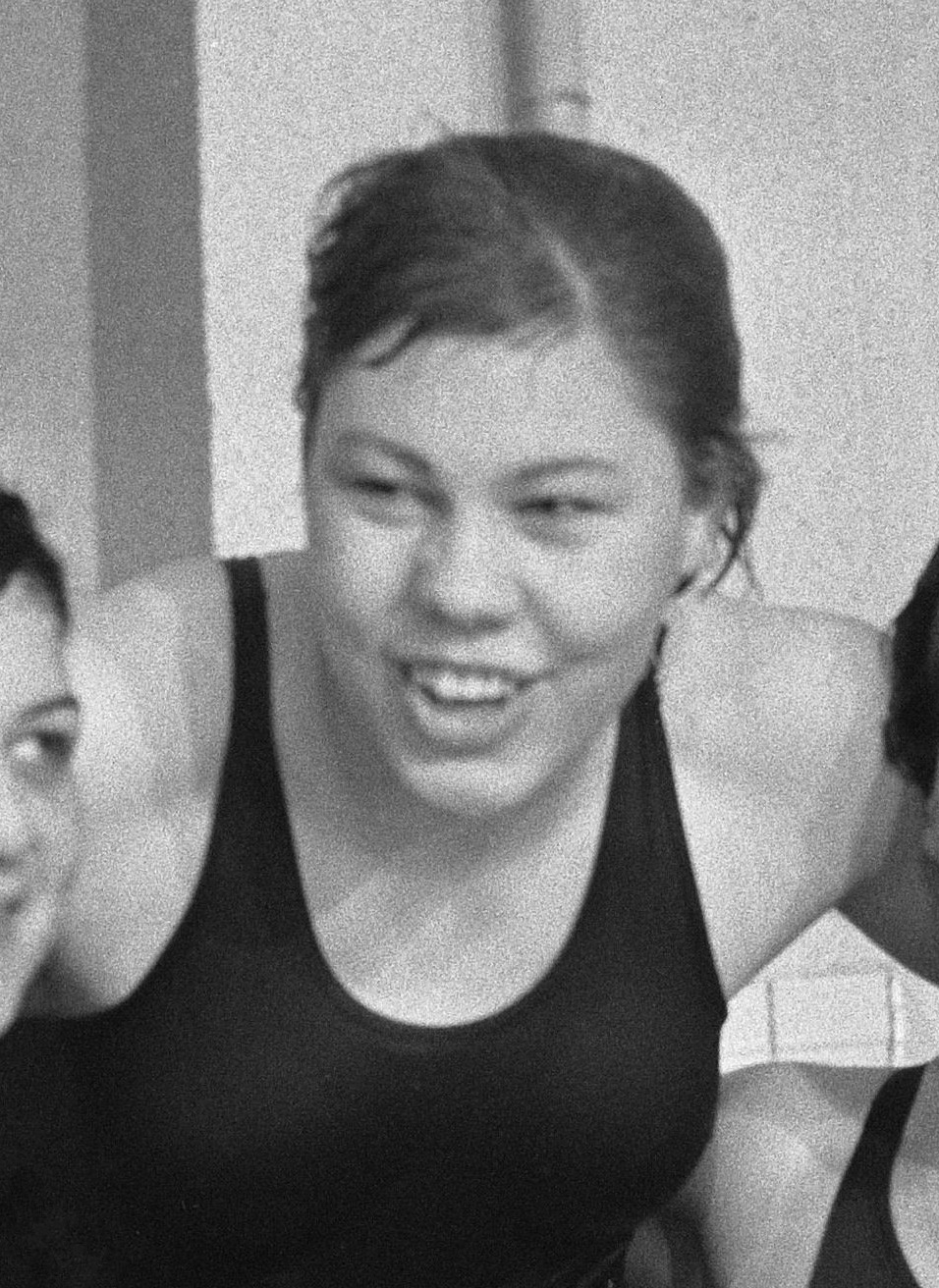
- Klenie Bimolt in 1964

Personal information
- Born: 8 June 1945 (age 81) Assen, the Netherlands
- Height: 1.74 m (5 ft 9 in)
- Weight: 70 kg (150 lb)

Sport
- Club: GZ&PC, Groningen
Medal record
Women's Swimming
Representing the Netherlands
Olympic Games
| Silver medal – second place | 1964 Tokyo | 4×100 m medley relay |
European Championships
| Silver medal – second place | 1962 Leipzig | 4×100 m medley relay |
| Silver medal – second place | 1962 Leipzig | 200 m breaststroke |

Klena ("Klenie") Geertje Bimolt (born 8 June 1945 in Assen, Drenthe) is a former breaststroke swimmer from the Netherlands, who won the silver medal in the 4 × 100 medley relay at the 1964 Summer Olympics. She did so together with her teammates Corrie Winkel, Ada Kok and Erica Terpstra. The same year, she helped the Dutch team to set the world record in the same event. Bimolt also competed at the 1968 Summer Olympics in the 4 × 100 medley relay, but finished seventh. She won two silver medals at the 1962 European Aquatics Championships

Nationally, she dominated breastroke in the 1960s, setting 13 records and winning all 100 m and 200 m titles in 1962–1965 and 1967, as well as 200 m in 1968 (after Marjan Janus). She also broke four European records: one in the 100 m breastroke (1964) and three in the 4×100 m medley relay (1964, 1968).
