= Val Winter =

Australian fencer

Personal information
- Born: Walburga Winter; 19 July 1943
- Died: 12 July 2024 (aged 80) Auckland, New Zealand

Sport
- Sport: Fencing
Medal record
Representing Australia
Women's Fencing
British Empire and Commonwealth Games
Silver medal – second place	1966 Kingston	Team Foil

Walburga 'Val' Winter (19 July 1943 – 12 July 2024) was an Australian fencer. She competed in the women's team foil event at the 1964 Summer Olympics, alongside her sisters Johanna and Ulrike Winter.
