= Tommy Angell =

American fencer (1924–2022)

Personal information
- Born: May 6, 1924; Berkeley, California, U.S.
- Died: January 19, 2022 (aged 97)

Sport
- Sport: Fencing

Dorothy Ferrell “Tommy” Angell (May 6, 1924 – January 19, 2022) was an American fencer. She competed in the women's individual and team foil events at the 1964 Summer Olympics.
