= Ulrike Winter =

Australian fencer

Personal information
- Born: 24 November 1940 (age 85)

Sport
- Sport: Fencing

Ulrike Winter (born 24 November 1940) is an Australian former fencer. She competed in the women's team foil event at the 1964 Summer Olympics, alongside her sisters Johanna and Val Winter.
