= Giovanna Masciotta =

Italian fencer (born 1942)

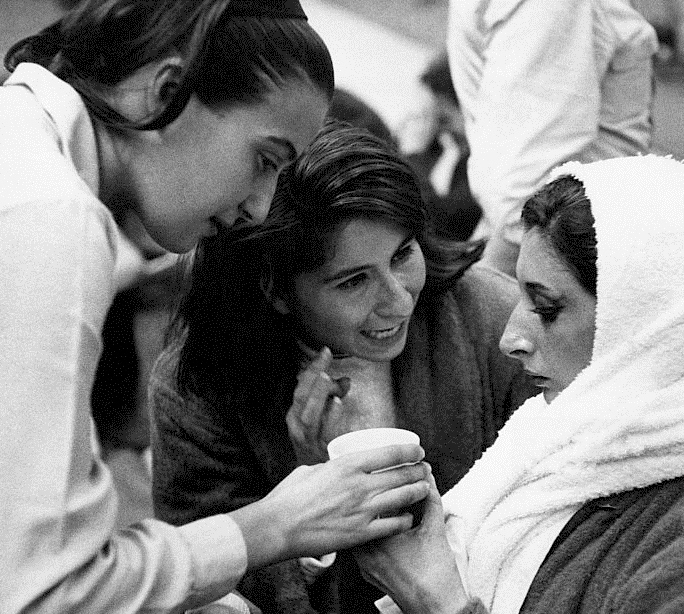
- Natalina Sanguinetti, Giovanna Masciotta (center) and Antonella Ragno at the 1964 Olympics

Personal information
- Born: 2 September 1942 (age 83) Lanzo Torinese, Italy
- Height: 1.69 m (5 ft 7 in)
- Weight: 65 kg (143 lb)

Sport
- Sport: Fencing
- Club: Club Scherma Torino

Giovanna Masciotta (born 2 September 1942) is a retired Italian fencer. She competed in the individual and team foil events at the 1964 and 1968 Summer Olympics with the best result of fourth place in the team event in 1964. Her father Aldo Masciotta also was an Olympic fencer.
