= Nanette Duncan =

Australian swimmer

Personal information
- Born: 9 July 1947 (age 79)

Sport
- Sport: Swimming
- Strokes: backstroke, freestyle

Nanette Duncan (born 9 July 1947) is an Australian former swimmer. She competed in three events at the 1964 Summer Olympics. Nanette grew up in Bankstown, she was coached by Don Talbot and attended the Presbyterian Ladies' College, Sydney.
