= Zsuzsa Kovács =

Hungarian swimmer (born 1945)

Personal information
- Born: 13 November 1945 (age 80) Hódmezővásárhely, Hungary
- Height: 1.68 m (5 ft 6 in)
- Weight: 60 kg (132 lb)

Sport
- Sport: Swimming
- Club: Ferencvárosi TC
Medal record
Representing Hungary
European Championships
Bronze medal – third place	1962 Leipzig	4×100 m freestyle

Zsuzsa Kovács (born 13 November 1945) is a retired Hungarian swimmer who won a bronze medal in the 4×100 m freestyle relay at the 1962 European Aquatics Championships. She competed in the 4×100 m medley relay and 200 m breaststroke events at the 1964 Summer Olympics, but did not reach the finals.
