= Thomas Owens (sailor) =

Australian sailor

Thomas Owens (10 July 1938 – 28 February 2015) was an Australian sailor who competed in the 1964 Summer Olympics.
