= Christine Barnetson =

Australian swimmer (1948–2019)

Christine P. Barnetson
Personal information
- Born: 5 March 1948 Perth, Western Australia
- Died: 19 June 2019 (aged 71) Perth, Western Australia

Sport
- Sport: Swimming
- College team: Perth College
Medal record
Representing Australia
Summer Universiade
Bronze medal – third place	1967 Tokyo	100m breaststroke

Christine P. Barnetson (5 March 1948 – 19 June 2019) was an Australian swimmer. She competed in the women's 200 metre breaststroke at the 1964 Summer Olympics.

Barnetson was born on 5 March 1948 in Perth, Western Australia. She attended Perth College, where at the age of sixteen she was selected to represent Australia at the 1964 Summer Olympics in Tokyo.

After the Olympics she went to graduate with a Bachelor of Education and Diploma of Physical Education from the University of Western Australia, later obtaining a Masters in Education Administration from the University of New England, Armidale. Barnetson taught in the Western Australian government school system before taking up an academic position at the WA College of Advanced Education, which subsequently became Edith Cowan University.

In 2009, she was inducted into the Swimming WA Hall of Fame.
