= Yoshie Komori =

Japanese fencer

Personal information
- Born: 10 May 1937 (age 89)

Sport
- Sport: Fencing

Yoshie Komori (小森 芳枝, Komori Yoshie; born 10 May 1937) is a Japanese fencer. She competed in the women's team foil event at the 1964 Summer Olympics.
