= Tamiko Yasui =

Japanese fencer

Personal information
- Born: 3 June 1942 (age 84)

Sport
- Sport: Fencing

Tamiko Yasui (保井 多美子, Yasui Tamiko; born 3 June 1942) is a Japanese fencer. She competed in the women's individual and team foil events at the 1964 Summer Olympics.
