= Bärbel Grimmer =

German swimmer

Personal information
- Born: 7 April 1945 (age 81) Rostock, Germany

Sport
- Sport: Swimming

Bärbel Grimmer (born 7 April 1945) is a German former swimmer. She competed in two events at the 1964 Summer Olympics.
