= Jan Turner (swimmer) =

Australian swimmer

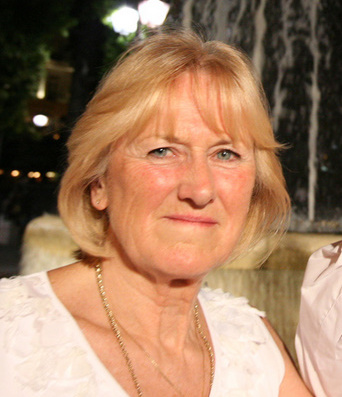
- Turner in 2007

Personal information
- Nationality: Australian
- Born: 12 November 1944 (age 81)

Sport
- Sport: Swimming
- Strokes: Freestyle, butterfly

Jan Becker (née Turner; 12 November 1944) is an Australian former swimmer. She competed in two events at the 1964 Summer Olympics.
