= Johanna Winter =

Australian fencer (born 1942)

Personal information
- Born: 21 May 1942 (age 84) Reichenberg, Germany

Sport
- Sport: Fencing
Medal record
Fencing
Representing Australia
British Empire Games
Silver medal – second place	1962 Perth	Women's Foil

Johanna Winter (born 21 May 1942) is an Australian-German fencer. She competed for Australia at the 1960 and 1964 Summer Olympics. At Tokyo in 1964 her sisters Ulrike and Val Winter were also members of the Australian fencing team.
