= Jan Redman =

Australian fencer

Personal information
- Born: 21 February 1932
- Died: 1977 (aged 44–45)

Sport
- Sport: Fencing

Jan Redman (21 February 1932 – 1977) was an Australian fencer. She competed in the women's individual and team foil events at the 1964 Summer Olympics.
