= Mary Watts-Tobin =

British fencer

Personal information
- Nationality: British
- Born: 21 December 1936 (age 89) London, England

Sport
- Sport: Fencing
- Event: Foil

Mary Watts-Tobin (born 21 December 1936) is a British fencer. She competed in the women's individual and team foil events at the 1964 Summer Olympics.

Watts-Tobin studied at Newnham College, Cambridge, and later trained in medicine at the University of London. In 1963, she married physicist Richard Watts-Tobin.
