= Tomoko Owada =

Japanese fencer

Personal information
- Born: 15 March 1941 (age 85)

Sport
- Sport: Fencing

Tomoko Owada (大和田 智子, Ōwada Tomoko; born 15 March 1941) is a Japanese fencer. She competed in the women's individual and team foil events at the 1964 Summer Olympics.
