= Yoshie Takeuchi (fencer) =

Japanese fencer

Personal information
- Born: 18 May 1932 (age 94)

Sport
- Sport: Fencing

Yoshie Takeuchi (竹内 由江, Takeuchi Yoshie; born 18 May 1932) is a Japanese fencer. She competed in the women's individual and team foil events at the 1964 Summer Olympics.
