= Fencing at the 1960 Summer Olympics – Men's foil =

Fencing at the Olympics

Men's foil at the Games of the XVII Olympiad
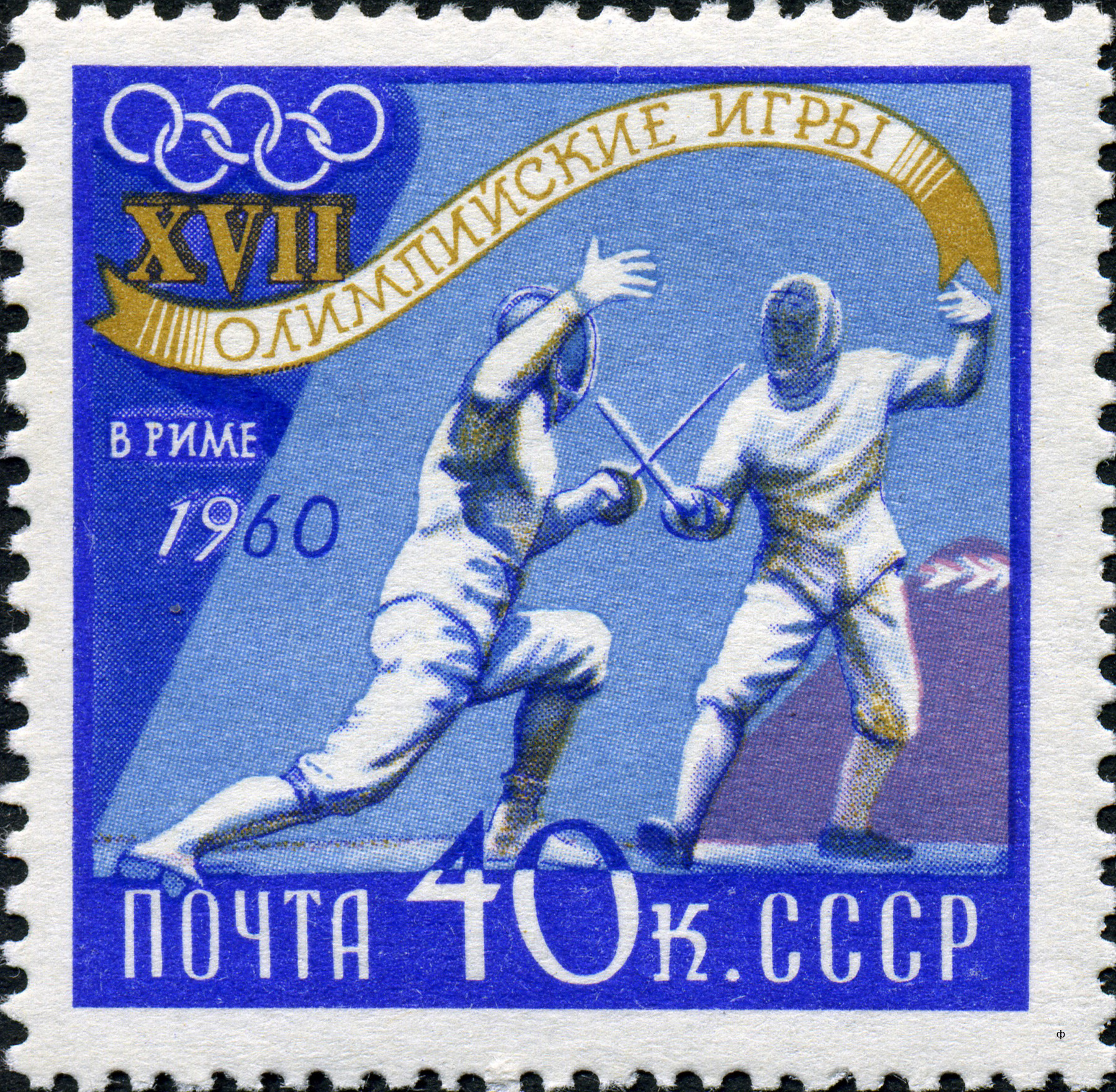
- Soviet stamp commemorating 1960 Olympic fencing
- Venue: Palazzo dei Congressi
- Dates: 29–30 August
- Competitors: 78 from 31 nations

Medalists
1st place, gold medalist(s)		Viktor Zhdanovich	Soviet Union
2nd place, silver medalist(s)		Yury Sisikin	Soviet Union
3rd place, bronze medalist(s)		Albie Axelrod	United States

The men's foil was one of eight fencing events on the fencing at the 1960 Summer Olympics programme. It was the thirteenth appearance of the event. The competition was held from 29 – 30 August 1960. 78 fencers from 31 nations competed. Nations had been limited to three fencers each since 1928. The event was won by Viktor Zhdanovich of the Soviet Union, with his countryman Yury Sisikin the runner-up; they were the nation's first medals in the event. The Soviets nearly swept the medals, with Mark Midler advancing to a three-man barrage for third place before finishing in fifth place. Albie Axelrod's bronze put the United States on the podium for the event for the first time since 1932. Traditional powers Italy and France, who between them had won 11 of 12 gold medals and 9 of 12 silver, were kept off the podium entirely (and Italy did not even have a fencer made the final).

== Background ==
This was the 13th appearance of the event, which has been held at every Summer Olympics except 1908 (when there was a foil display only rather than a medal event). Three of the eight finalists from 1956 returned: two-time gold medalist (and 1948 silver medalist) Christian d'Oriola of France, fourth-place finisher Allan Jay of Great Britain, and seventh-place finisher Mark Midler of the Soviet Union. D'Oriola was a strong contender for a third gold medal, but the Italian and French hegemony in the event was threatened by rising strength of other nations. Jay was the reigning world champion. The Soviets had won the team event at the world championships.

Monaco, Morocco, New Zealand, Tunisia, and Vietnam each made their debut in the men's foil. The United States made its 12th appearance, most of any nation, having missed only the inaugural 1896 competition.

== Competition format ==
The competition used a pool play format, with each fencer facing the other fencers in the pool in a round robin. Bouts were to 5 touches. It is unclear how ties were broken in the first round; beginning in round 2, barrages were used to break ties necessary for advancement. However, only as much fencing was done as was necessary to determine advancement, so some bouts never occurred if the fencers advancing from the pool could be determined. The competition involved 5 rounds:

- Round 1: 12 pools, 6 or 7 fencers to a pool (one pool had 5 due to a withdrawal), top 3 advance (total 36 advancing)
- Round 2: 6 pools, 6 fencers to a pool, top 4 advance (total 24 advancing)
- Quarterfinals: 4 pools, 6 fencers to a pool, top 3 advance (total 12 advancing)
- Semifinals: 2 pools, 6 fencers to a pool, top 4 advance (total 8 advancing)
- Final: 1 pool, 8 fencers

== Schedule ==
All times are Central European Time (UTC+1)

Date	Time	Round
Monday, 29 August 1960	8:30; 15:00	Round 1 Round 2
Tuesday, 30 August 1960	8:30; 13:00; 15:00	Quarterfinals; Semifinals; Final

== Results ==
=== Round 1 ===
The top three fencers in each pool advanced.

==== Round 1 Pool A ====
Pos	Fencer	W	L	TF	TA	Qual.	MF	MM	JP	MS	AEE	OA
1	Mitsuyuki Funamizu (JPN)	4	1	21	11	Q		1–5	5–0	5–3	5–3	5–0
2	Mark Midler (URS)	3	2	23	14	Q	5–1		4–5	4–5	5–2	5–1
3	Joseph Paletta Jr. (USA)	3	2	19	20	Q	0–5	5–4		5–3	5–3	4–5
4	Michel Steininger (SUI)	2	3	19	19		3–5	5–4	3–5		3–5	5–0
5	Ahmed El-Hamy El-Husseini (EGY)	2	3	18	18		3–5	2–5	3–5	5–3		5–0
6	Orlando Azinhais (POR)	1	4	9	24		0–5	1–5	5–4	0–5	3–5	

Source: Official Report, p. 765

==== Round 1 Pool B ====
Pos	Fencer	W	L	TF	TA	Qual.	CdO	TG	RC	FQ	MSo	MSi	PM
1	Christian d'Oriola (FRA)	5	1	29	13	Q		5–1	5–1	5–2	5–3	4–5	5–1
2	Tim Gerresheim (EUA)	4	2	22	18	Q	1–5		5–1	1–5	5–3	5–4	5–0
3	Ralph Cooperman (GBR)	4	2	22	17	Q	1–5	1–5		5–4	5–2	5–0	5–1
4	Freddy Quintero (VEN)	3	3	25	19		2–5	5–1	4–5		4–5	5–2	5–1
5	Moustafa Soheim (EGY)	2	4	22	26		3–5	3–5	2–5	5–4		5–2	4–5
6	Michael Sichel (AUS)	2	4	18	24		5–4	4–5	0–5	2–5	2–5		5–0
7	Pedro Marçal (POR)	1	5	8	29		1–5	0–5	1–5	1–5	5–4	0–5	

Source: Official Report, p. 765

==== Round 1 Pool C ====
Pos	Fencer	W	L	TF	TA	Qual.	AJ	JC	TM	FD	BS	LK
1	Allan Jay (GBR)	5	0	25	13	Q		5–4	5–2	5–2	5–3	5–2
2	Jean Cerrottini (SUI)	3	2	19	22	Q	4–5		0–5	5–4	5–4	5–4
3	Tănase Mureșanu (ROU)	2	3	16	17	Q	2–5	5–0		0–5	5–2	4–5
4	Franck Delhem (BEL)	2	3	20	16		2–5	4–5	5–0		4–5	5–1
5	Boris Stavrev (BUL)	2	3	19	21		3–5	4–5	2–5	5–4		5–2
6	Leif Klette (NOR)	1	4	14	24		2–5	4–5	5–4	1–5	2–5	

Source: Official Report, p. 766

==== Round 1 Pool D ====
Pos	Fencer	W	L	TF	TA	Qual.	JR	JK	EG	LG	GO	JD	GA
1	Jan Różycki (POL)	4	1	23	15	Q		3–5	5–4	5–2	5–2		5–2
2	Jenő Kamuti (HUN)	4	1	24	14	Q	5–3		5–1	4–5		5–3	5–2
3	Eugene Glazer (USA)	4	2	25	19	Q	4–5	1–5		5–1	5–1	5–4	5–3
4	Luis García (VEN)	3	3	22	26		2–5	5–4	1–5		4–5	5–4	5–3
5	Gilbert Orengo (MON)	2	3	15	23		2–5		1–5	5–4		5–4	2–5
6	Jesús Díez (ESP)	1	4	20	23			3–5	4–5	4–5	4–5		5–3
7	Göran Abrahamsson (SWE)	1	5	18	27		2–5	2–5	3–5	3–5	5–2	3–5	

Source: Official Report, p. 766

==== Round 1 Pool E ====
Pos	Fencer	W	L	TF	TA	Qual.	JG	JB	MC	ED	AD	HT	JK
1	Jesús Gruber (VEN)	5	1	25	16	Q		5–4	5–3	0–5	5–1	5–2	5–1
2	Jürgen Brecht (EUA)	4	2	26	18	Q	4–5		2–5	5–1	5–3	5–2	5–2
3	Mario Curletto (ITA)	4	2	26	19	Q	3–5	5–2		5–2	5–3	5–2	3–5
4	Édouard Didier (LUX)	3	3	19	18		5–0	1–5	2–5		1–5	5–1	5–2
5	Asen Dyakovski (BUL)	3	3	22	18		1–5	3–5	3–5	5–1		5–1	5–1
6	Harry Thuillier (IRL)	1	5	13	26		2–5	2–5	2–5	1–5	1–5		5–1
7	Jean Khayat (TUN)	1	5	12	28		1–5	2–5	5–3	2–5	1–5	1–5	

Source: Official Report, p. 766

==== Round 1 Pool F ====
Pos	Fencer	W	L	TF	TA	Qual.	BH	MF	JM	HL	WF	HB	RB
1	Bill Hoskyns (GBR)	6	0	30	5	Q		5–1	5–0	5–1	5–3	5–0	5–0
2	Mihály Fülöp (HUN)	5	1	26	13	Q	1–5		5–2	5–1	5–1	5–0	5–4
3	Joaquín Moya (ESP)	3	3	20	24	Q	0–5	2–5		3–5	5–4	5–4	5–1
4	Hans Lagerwall (SWE)	3	2	17	15		1–5	1–5	5–3		5–0		5–2
5	William Fajardo (MEX)	1	5	16	28		3–5	1–5	4–5	0–5		5–3	3–5
6	Henri Bini (MON)	1	4	10	21		0–5	0–5	4–5		1–5		5–1
7	Raoul Barouch (TUN)	1	5	13	28		0–5	4–5	1–5	2–5	5–3	1–5	

Source: Official Report, p. 767

==== Round 1 Pool G ====
Pos	Fencer	W	L	TF	TA	Qual.	VZ	AC	EG	JD	JP	BP
1	Viktor Zhdanovich (URS)	4	1	24	11	Q		4–5	5–2	5–2	5–0	5–2
2	Attila Csipler (ROU)	4	1	24	17	Q	5–4		5–1	5–3	4–5	5–4
3	Enrique González (ESP)	2	3	16	19	Q	2–5	1–5		5–3	3–5	5–1
4	Jacques Debeur (BEL)	2	3	18	19		2–5	3–5	3–5		5–4	5–1
5	Juan Paladino (URU)	2	3	18	22		0–5	5–4	5–3	4–5		4–5
6	Brian Pickworth (NZL)	1	4	13	24		2–5	4–5	1–5	1–5	5–4	

Source: Official Report, p. 768

==== Round 1 Pool H ====
Pos	Fencer	W	L	TF	TA	Qual.	JL	LK	BM	HO	OL	CE	TVX
1	Jean Link (LUX)	5	0	25	8	Q		5–2	5–2	5–1		5–0	5–3
2	László Kamuti (HUN)	5	1	27	17	Q	2–5		5–4	5–4	5–1	5–2	5–1
3	Brian McCowage (AUS)	4	2	26	21	Q	2–5	4–5		5–3	5–0	5–4	5–4
4	Heizaburo Okawa (JPN)	3	3	23	19		1–5	4–5	3–5		5–4	5–0	5–0
5	Orvar Lindwall (SWE)	2	3	15	21			1–5	0–5	4–5		5–2	5–4
6	Charles El-Gressy (MAR)	0	5	8	25		0–5	2–5	4–5	0–5	2–5		
7	Trần Văn Xuan (VIE)	0	5	12	25		3–5	1–5	4–5	0–5	4–5		

Source: Official Report, p. 768

==== Round 1 Pool I ====
Saev of Bulgaria did not start, leaving this pool with only 5 fencers.

Pos	Fencer	W	L	TF	TA	Qual.	WW	LC	RC	RS	NB
1	Witold Woyda (POL)	4	0	20	8	Q		5–2	5–1	5–2	5–3
2	Luigi Carpaneda (ITA)	3	1	17	15	Q	2–5		5–4	5–2	5–4
3	Roger Closset (FRA)	2	2	15	11	Q	1–5	4–5		5–1	5–0
4	Robert Schiel (LUX)	1	3	10	18		2–5	2–5	1–5		5–3
5	Norbert Brami (TUN)	0	4	10	20		3–5	4–5	0–5	3–5	

Source: Official Report, p. 768

==== Round 1 Pool J ====
Pos	Fencer	W	L	TF	TA	Qual.	EM	RP	AA	JD	CP	AE
1	Eberhard Mehl (EUA)	5	0	25	5	Q		5–0	5–1	5–2	5–2	5–0
2	Ryszard Parulski (POL)	4	1	20	14	Q	0–5		5–1	5–3	5–4	5–1
3	Albie Axelrod (USA)	3	2	17	16	Q	1–5	1–5		5–2	5–2	5–2
4	Jaime Duque (COL)	1	3	12	17		2–5	3–5	2–5			5–2
5	Claudio Polledri (SUI)	1	3	13	17		2–5	4–5	2–5			5–2
6	Abderraouf El-Fassy (MAR)	0	5	7	25		0–5	1–5	2–5	2–5	2–5	

Source: Official Report, p. 769

==== Round 1 Pool K ====
Pos	Fencer	W	L	TF	TA	Qual.	YS	JCM	RC	IL	MGE	KT	MB
1	Yury Sisikin (URS)	4	1	24	13	Q		4–5		5–1	5–3	5–3	5–1
2	Jean-Claude Magnan (FRA)	4	0	20	12	Q	5–4		5–2	5–2	5–4		
3	Raúl Cicero (MEX)	3	1	17	14	Q		2–5			5–2	5–3	5–4
4	Ivan Lund (AUS)	1	3	11	17		1–5	2–5				5–2	3–5
5	Mohamed Gamil El-Kalyoubi (EGY)	1	3	14	19		3–5	4–5	2–5			5–4	
6	Kazuhiko Tabuchi (JPN)	1	4	17	22		3–5		3–5	2–5	4–5		5–2
7	Manuel Borrego (POR)	1	3	12	18		1–5		4–5	5–3		2–5	

Source: Official Report, p. 769

==== Round 1 Pool L ====
Pos	Fencer	W	L	TF	TA	Qual.	AP	ID	AV	CS	BH	EE	MBJ
1	Alberto Pellegrino (ITA)	4	0	20	7	Q				5–2	5–2	5–3	5–0
2	Ion Drîmbă (ROU)	4	1	24	12	Q			4–5	5–4	5–1	5–0	5–2
3	André Verhalle (BEL)	4	1	23	12	Q		5–4		5–2	5–1	3–5	5–0
4	Carl Schwende (CAN)	2	3	18	16		2–5	4–5	2–5			5–0	5–1
5	Brian Hamilton (IRL)	1	3	9	19		2–5	1–5	1–5				5–4
6	Emilio Echeverry (COL)	1	3	8	18		3–5	0–5	5–3	0–5			
7	Mohamed Ben Joullon (MAR)	0	5	7	25		0–5	2–5	0–5	1–5	4–5		

Source: Official Report, p. 769

=== Round 2 ===
==== Round 2 Pool A ====
The fifth (final) round of the pool was cancelled entirely, as it was clear who the four advancing would be; each fencer thus faced only 4 others.

Pos	Fencer	W	L	TF	TA	Qual.	JCM	BH	AA	JG	LK	JM
1	Jean-Claude Magnan (FRA)	4	0	20	7	Q		5–1	5–3		5–3	5–0
2	Bill Hoskyns (GBR)	3	1	16	8	Q	1–5			5–2	5–1	5–0
3	Albie Axelrod (USA)	3	1	18	12	Q	3–5			5–1	5–2	5–4
4	Jesús Gruber (VEN)	2	2	13	17	Q		2–5	1–5		5–3	5–4
5	László Kamuti (HUN)	0	4	9	20		3–5	1–5	2–5	3–5		
6	Joaquín Moya (ESP)	0	4	8	20		0–5	0–5	4–5	4–5		

Source: Official Report, p. 770

==== Round 2 Pool B ====
Pos	Fencer	W	L	TF	TA	Qual.	WW	JB	YS	MC	RC	ID
1	Witold Woyda (POL)	4	0	20	9	Q			5–1	5–3	5–1	5–4
2	Jürgen Brecht (EUA)	3	1	18	10	Q			5–2	3–5	5–2	5–1
3	Yury Sisikin (URS)	3	2	18	16	Q	1–5	2–5		5–2	5–3	5–1
4	Mario Curletto (ITA)	2	2	15	14	Q	3–5	5–3	2–5		5–1	
5	Ralph Cooperman (GBR)	1	4	12	23		1–5	2–5	3–5	1–5		5–3
6	Ion Drîmbă (ROU)	0	4	9	20		4–5	1–5	1–5		3–5	

Source: Official Report, p. 770

==== Round 2 Pool C ====
Pos	Fencer	W	L	TF	TA	Qual.	EM	VZ	MF	AV	JP	RC
1	Eberhard Mehl (EUA)	4	1	23	15	Q		5–3	3–5	5–3	5–4	5–0
2	Viktor Zhdanovich (URS)	3	1	18	9	Q	3–5		5–3		5–0	5–1
3	Mihály Fülöp (HUN)	3	2	22	19	Q	5–3	3–5		5–3	4–5	5–3
4	André Verhalle (BEL)	2	2	16	16	Q	3–5		3–5		5–4	5–2
5	Joseph Paletta Jr. (USA)	1	3	9	19		4–5	0–5	5–4	0–5		
6	Raúl Cicero (MEX)	0	4	6	20		0–5	1–5	3–5	2–5		

Source: Official Report, p. 770

==== Round 2 Pool D ====
Pos	Fencer	W	L	TF	TA	Qual.	TG	LC	MM	JR	JL	BM
1	Tim Gerresheim (EUA)	5	0	25	15	Q		5–4	5–2	5–2	5–4	5–3
2	Luigi Carpaneda (ITA)	3	1	19	12	Q	4–5		5–3		5–3	5–1
3	Mark Midler (URS)	2	2	15	13	Q	2–5	3–5		5–3	5–0	
4	Jan Różycki (POL)	2	2	15	15	Q	2–5		3–5		5–3	5–2
5	Jean Link (LUX)	1	4	15	21		4–5	3–5	0–4	3–5		5–2
6	Brian McCowage (AUS)	0	4	8	20		3–5	1–5		2–5	2–5	

Source: Official Report, p. 772

==== Round 2 Pool E ====
Pos	Fencer	W	L	TF	TA	Qual.	AP	RP	CdO	TM	JC	EG
1	Alberto Pellegrino (ITA)	3	2	18	15	Q		2–5	1–5	5–0	5–1	5–4
2	Ryszard Parulski (POL)	3	2	20	16	Q	5–2		2–5	3–5	5–2	5–2
3	Christian d'Oriola (FRA)	3	1	17	12	Q	5–1	5–2		5–4	2–5	
4	Tănase Mureșanu (ROU)	3	2	19	18	Q	0–5	5–3	4–5		5–3	5–2
5	Jean Cerrottini (SUI)	2	3	16	20		1–5	2–5	5–2	3–5		5–3
6	Enrique González (ESP)	0	4	11	20		4–5	2–5		2–5	3–5	

Source: Official Report, p. 772

==== Round 2 Pool F ====
There was a 4-way tie for 3rd place, requiring a barrage for the last two advancement places.

Pos	Fencer	W	L	TF	TA	Qual.	JK	RC	AJ	EG	MF	AC
1	Jenő Kamuti (HUN)	4	1	24	14	Q		4–5	5–1	5–3	5–2	5–3
2	Roger Closset (FRA)	3	2	16	16	Q	5–4		0–5	1–5	5–2	5–0
3	Allan Jay (GBR)	2	3	19	19	B	1–5	5–0		4–5	4–5	5–4
4	Eugene Glazer (USA)	2	3	18	20	B	3–5	5–1	5–4		1–5	4–5
5	Mitsuyuki Funamizu (JPN)	2	3	16	20	B	2–5	2–5	5–4	5–1		2–5
6	Attila Csipler (ROU)	2	3	17	21	B	3–5	0–5	4–5	5–4	5–2	

Source: Official Report, p. 772

Barrage

Pos	Fencer	W	L	TF	TA	Qual.	AJ	EG	MF	AC
1	Allan Jay (GBR)	2	1	12	9	Q		2–5	5–3	5–1
2	Eugene Glazer (USA)	2	1	10	11	Q	5–2		5–4	0–5
3	Mitsuyuki Funamizu (JPN)	1	2	12	14		3–5	4–5		5–4
4	Attila Csipler (ROU)	1	2	10	10		1–5	5–0	4–5	

Source: Official Report, p. 772

=== Quarterfinals ===
==== Quarterfinal A ====
There was a four-way tie for 3rd place; a barrage was held to determine the final advancing fencer.

Pos	Fencer	W	L	TF	TA	Qual.	BH	YS	WW	MC	AV	JK
1	Bill Hoskyns (GBR)	4	1	23	19	Q		5–4	3–5	5–3	5–3	5–4
2	Yury Sisikin (URS)	3	2	22	18	Q	4–5		5–3	3–5	5–1	5–4
3	Witold Woyda (POL)	2	3	19	20	B	5–3	3–5		5–2	3–5	3–5
4	Mario Curletto (ITA)	2	3	17	19	B	3–5	5–3	2–5		5–1	2–5
5	André Verhalle (BEL)	2	3	15	20	B	3–5	1–5	5–3	1–5		5–2
6	Jenő Kamuti (HUN)	2	3	20	20	B	4–5	4–5	5–3	5–2	2–5	

Source: Official Report, p. 773

Barrage

Pos	Fencer	W	L	TF	TA	Qual.	WW	MC	AV	JK
1	Witold Woyda (POL)	1	1	9	6	Q		4–5		5–1
2	Mario Curletto (ITA)	1	1	7	9		5–4			2–5
3	André Verhalle (BEL)	0	0	0	0					
4	Jenő Kamuti (HUN)	2	3	6	7		1–5	5–2		

Source: Official Report, p. 773

==== Quarterfinal B ====
Carpaneda and d'Oriola tied for the 3rd and final advancement place at 3–2, so fenced off for the spot. Carpaneda had won the initial round-robin bout, but d'Oriola won the fence-off and advanced.

Pos	Fencer	W	L	TF	TA	Qual.	RP	MM	CdO	LC	EG	JB
1	Ryszard Parulski (POL)	4	1	23	12	Q		5–2	3–5	5–1	5–2	5–2
2	Mark Midler (URS)	4	1	22	12	Q	2–5		5–1	5–4	5–1	5–1
3	Christian d'Oriola (FRA)	3	2	19	20	B	5–3	1–5		3–5	5–4	5–3
4	Luigi Carpaneda (ITA)	3	2	20	16	B	1–5	4–5	5–3		5–1	5–2
5	Eugene Glazer (USA)	1	4	13	23		2–5	1–5	4–5	1–5		5–3
6	Jürgen Brecht (EUA)	0	5	11	25		2–5	1–5	3–5	2–5	3–5	

Source: Official Report, p. 773

Barrage

Pos	Fencer	W	L	TF	TA	Qual.	CdO	LC
1	Christian d'Oriola (FRA)	1	0	5	4	Q		5–4
2	Luigi Carpaneda (ITA)	0	1	4	5		4–5	

Source: Official Report, p. 773

==== Quarterfinal C ====
Pos	Fencer	W	L	TF	TA	Qual.	VZ	JR	RC	AP	TG	JG
1	Viktor Zhdanovich (URS)	4	0	20	4	Q			5–1	5–0	5–2	5–1
2	Jan Różycki (POL)	3	1	16	14	Q			5–3	1–5	5–3	5–3
3	Roger Closset (FRA)	3	2	19	17	Q	1–5	3–5		5–2	5–3	5–2
4	Alberto Pellegrino (ITA)	2	3	15	19		0–5	5–1	2–5		3–5	5–3
5	Tim Gerresheim (EUA)	1	3	13	18		2–5	3–5	3–5	5–3		
6	Jesús Gruber (VEN)	0	4	9	20		1–5	3–5	2–5	3–5		

Source: Official Report, p. 774

==== Quarterfinal D ====
With a three-way tie for 2nd place, a barrage was needed to determine two advancement spots.

Pos	Fencer	W	L	TF	TA	Qual.	AA	EM	MF	TM	JCM	AJ
1	Albie Axelrod (USA)	4	1	24	16	Q		4–5	5–3	5–4	5–1	5–3
2	Eberhard Mehl (EUA)	3	2	22	17	B	5–4		4–5	3–5	5–3	5–0
3	Mihály Fülöp (HUN)	3	2	19	20	B	3–5	5–4		5–3	1–5	5–3
4	Tănase Mureșanu (ROU)	3	2	22	18	B	4–5	5–3	3–5		5–2	5–3
5	Jean-Claude Magnan (FRA)	1	4	14	21		1–5	3–5	5–1	2–5		3–5
6	Allan Jay (GBR)	1	4	14	23		3–5	0–5	3–5	3–5	5–3	

Source: Official Report, p. 774

Barrage

Pos	Fencer	W	L	TF	TA	Qual.	EM	MF	TM
1	Eberhard Mehl (EUA)	1	0	5	3	Q			5–3
2	Mihály Fülöp (HUN)	1	0	5	3	Q			5–3
3	Tănase Mureșanu (ROU)	0	2	6	10		3–5	3–5	

Source: Official Report, p. 774

=== Semifinals ===
==== Semifinal A ====
In a very closely contested semifinal, each fencer finished either 3–2 or 2–3. With a three-way tie for 4th place, a barrage was needed to determine the final advancement spot.

Pos	Fencer	W	L	TF	TA	Qual.	AA	WW	VZ	CdO	MF	RP
1	Albie Axelrod (USA)	3	2	19	16	Q		3–5	1–5	5–2	5–1	5–3
2	Witold Woyda (POL)	3	2	23	17	Q	4–5		5–1	5–3	5–3	4–5
3	Viktor Zhdanovich (URS)	3	2	21	18	Q	5–3	5–4		3–5	5–1	3–5
4	Christian d'Oriola (FRA)	2	3	19	20	B	2–5	3–5	5–3		4–5	5–2
5	Mihály Fülöp (HUN)	2	3	15	20	B	1–5	3–5	1–5	5–4		5–1
6	Ryszard Parulski (POL)	2	3	16	22	B	3–5	5–4	5–3	2–5	1–5	

Source: Official Report, p. 776

Barrage

Pos	Fencer	W	L	TF	TA	Qual.	CdO	MF	RP
1	Christian d'Oriola (FRA)	2	0	10	2	Q		5–2	5–0
2	Mihály Fülöp (HUN)	0	1	2	5		2–5		
3	Ryszard Parulski (POL)	0	1	0	5		0–5		

Source: Official Report, p. 776

==== Semifinal B ====
Hoskyns and Różycki tied for 4th at 2–3. In the barrage, Hoskyns was victorious, repeating his 5–1 win over Różycki in the round-robin.

Pos	Fencer	W	L	TF	TA	Qual.	MM	YS	RC	BH	JR	EM
1	Mark Midler (URS)	4	1	22	14	Q		5–3	5–0	5–2	2–5	5–4
2	Yury Sisikin (URS)	3	2	18	18	Q	3–5		5–2	5–3	5–3	0–5
3	Roger Closset (FRA)	3	2	17	16	Q	0–5	2–5		5–1	5–3	5–2
4	Bill Hoskyns (GBR)	2	3	16	20	B	2–5	3–5	1–5		5–1	5–4
5	Jan Różycki (POL)	2	3	17	17	B	5–2	3–5	3–5	1–5		5–0
6	Eberhard Mehl (EUA)	1	4	13	20		4–5	5–0	2–5	4–5	0–5	

Source: Official Report, p. 776

Barrage

Pos	Fencer	W	L	TF	TA	Qual.	BH	JR
1	Bill Hoskyns (GBR)	1	0	5	1	Q		5–1
2	Jan Różycki (POL)	0	1	1	5		1–5	

Source: Official Report, p. 776

=== Final ===
After a 3–2 record in the semifinals, Zhdanovich swept the entire field in the final and finished 7–0 for the gold medal. The next closest fencer and thus silver medalist, Sisikin, went 4–2. Closset dislocated his right knee and was unable to finish the round; his bouts against Sisikin, Axelrod, and Woyda were cancelled. The three men tied for third place at 3 wins (regardless of losses, which were different due to Closset's injury) faced off in a barrage for the bronze medal; Axelrod won by beating both of the other hopefuls. Despite only competing in four bouts, Closset finished in a tie for 6th at 2 wins (he was 2–2 in his bouts), winning the tie-breaker against Hoskyns (2–5) based on touches received in their respective victories: Closset's wins were both by 5–3 scores, for a total of 6 touches received, while Hoskyns's wins were by 5–4 scores, with a total of 8 touches received).

Pos	Fencer	W	L	TF	TA	Qual.	VZ	YS	AA	WW	MM	RC	BH	CdO
1st place, gold medalist(s)	Viktor Zhdanovich (URS)	7	0	35	20			5–4	5–2	5–2	5–4	5–2	5–3	5–3
2nd place, silver medalist(s)	Yury Sisikin (URS)	4	2	27	21		4–5		5–2	3–5	5–4		5–1	5–4
3	Albie Axelrod (USA)	3	3	23	24	B	2–5	2–5		5–3	5–2		4–5	5–4
3	Witold Woyda (POL)	3	3	24	23	B	2–5	5–3	3–5		4–5		5–3	5–2
3	Mark Midler (URS)	3	4	28	25	B	4–5	4–5	2–5	5–4		3–5	5–1	5–0
6	Roger Closset (FRA)	2	2	14	16		2–5				5–3		5–3	2–5
7	Bill Hoskyns (GBR)	2	5	21	33		3–5	1–5	5–4	3–5	1–5	3–5		5–4
8	Christian d'Oriola (FRA)	1	6	22	32		3–5	4–5	4–5	2–5	0–5	5–2	4–5	

Source: Official Report, p. 777

Barrage

Pos	Fencer	W	L	TF	TA	AA	WW	MM
3rd place, bronze medalist(s)	Albie Axelrod (USA)	2	0	10	7		5–4	5–3
4	Witold Woyda (POL)	1	1	9	7	4–5		5–2
5	Mark Midler (URS)	0	2	5	10	3–5	2–5	

Source: Official Report, p. 777

== Overall standings ==
Rank	Fencer	Nation	Round 1	Round 2	Quarterfinals	Semifinals	Final
1st place, gold medalist(s)	Viktor Zhdanovich	Soviet Union	1	2	1	3	1
2nd place, silver medalist(s)	Yury Sisikin	Soviet Union	1	3	2	2	2
3rd place, bronze medalist(s)	Albie Axelrod	United States	3	3	1	1	3
4	Witold Woyda	Poland	1	1	3	2	4
5	Mark Midler	Soviet Union	2	3	2	1	5
6	Roger Closset	France	3	2	3	3	6
7	Bill Hoskyns	Great Britain	1	2	1	4	7
8	Christian d'Oriola	France	1	3	3	4	8
9	Mihály Fülöp	Hungary	2	3	3	5	Did not advance
9	Jan Różycki	Poland	1	4	2	5	Did not advance
11	Ryszard Parulski	Poland	2	2	1	6	Did not advance
11	Eberhard Mehl	United Team of Germany	1	1	2	6	Did not advance
13	Mario Curletto	Italy	3	4	4	did not advance	
13	Luigi Carpaneda	Italy	2	2	4	did not advance	
13	Alberto Pellegrino	Italy	1	1	4	did not advance	
13	Tănase Mureșanu	Romania	3	4	4	did not advance	
17	André Verhalle	Belgium	3	4	5	did not advance	
17	Eugene Glazer	United States	3	4	5	did not advance	
17	Tim Gerresheim	United Team of Germany	2	1	5	did not advance	
17	Jean-Claude Magnan	France	2	1	5	did not advance	
21	Jenő Kamuti	Hungary	2	1	6	did not advance	
21	Jürgen Brecht	United Team of Germany	2	2	6	did not advance	
21	Jesús Gruber	Venezuela	1	4	6	did not advance	
21	Allan Jay	Great Britain	1	3	6	did not advance	
25	László Kamuti	Hungary	2	5	did not advance		
25	Ralph Cooperman	Great Britain	3	5	did not advance		
25	Joseph Paletta Jr.	United States	3	5	did not advance		
25	Jean Link	Luxembourg	1	5	did not advance		
25	Jean Cerrottini	Switzerland	2	5	did not advance		
25	Mitsuyuki Funamizu	Japan	1	5	did not advance		
31	Joaquín Moya	Spain	3	6	did not advance		
31	Ion Drîmbă	Romania	2	6	did not advance		
31	Raúl Cicero	Mexico	3	6	did not advance		
31	Brian McCowage	Australia	3	6	did not advance		
31	Enrique González	Spain	3	6	did not advance		
31	Attila Csipler	Romania	2	6	did not advance		
37	Michel Steininger	Switzerland	4	did not advance			
37	Freddy Quintero	Venezuela	4	did not advance			
37	Franck Delhem	Belgium	4	did not advance			
37	Luis García	Venezuela	4	did not advance			
37	Édouard Didier	Luxembourg	4	did not advance			
37	Hans Lagerwall	Sweden	4	did not advance			
37	Jacques Debeur	Belgium	4	did not advance			
37	Heizaburo Okawa	Japan	4	did not advance			
37	Robert Schiel	Luxembourg	4	did not advance			
37	Jaime Duque	Colombia	4	did not advance			
37	Ivan Lund	Australia	4	did not advance			
37	Carl Schwende	Canada	4	did not advance			
49	Ahmed El-Hamy El-Husseini	Egypt	5	did not advance			
49	Moustafa Soheim	Egypt	5	did not advance			
49	Boris Stavrev	Bulgaria	5	did not advance			
49	Gilbert Orengo	Monaco	5	did not advance			
49	Asen Dyakovski	Bulgaria	5	did not advance			
49	William Fajardo	Mexico	5	did not advance			
49	Juan Paladino	Uruguay	5	did not advance			
49	Orvar Lindwall	Sweden	5	did not advance			
49	Norbert Brami	Tunisia	5	did not advance			
49	Claudio Polledri	Switzerland	5	did not advance			
49	Mohamed Gamil El-Kalyoubi	Egypt	5	did not advance			
49	Brian Hamilton	Ireland	5	did not advance			
61	Orlando Azinhais	Portugal	6	did not advance			
61	Michael Sichel	Australia	6	did not advance			
61	Leif Klette	Norway	6	did not advance			
61	Jesús Díez	Spain	6	did not advance			
61	Harry Thuillier	Ireland	6	did not advance			
61	Henri Bini	Monaco	6	did not advance			
61	Brian Pickworth	New Zealand	6	did not advance			
61	Charles El-Gressy	Morocco	6	did not advance			
61	Abderraouf El-Fassy	Morocco	6	did not advance			
61	Kazuhiko Tabuchi	Japan	6	did not advance			
61	Emilio Echeverry	Colombia	6	did not advance			
72	Pedro Marçal	Portugal	7	did not advance			
72	Göran Abrahamsson	Sweden	7	did not advance			
72	Jean Khayat	Tunisia	7	did not advance			
72	Raoul Barouch	Tunisia	7	did not advance			
72	Trần Văn Xuan	Vietnam	7	did not advance			
72	Manuel Borrego	Portugal	7	did not advance			
72	Mohamed Ben Joullon	Morocco	7	did not advance			
