= Fencing at the 1960 Summer Olympics – Men's team foil =

Men's team foil at the Games of the XVII Olympiad
- Venue: Palazzo dei Congressi
- Dates: 2 September
- Competitors: 77 from 16 nations

Medalists
1st place, gold medalist(s)		Viktor Zhdanovich; Yury Sisikin; Mark Midler; German Sveshnikov; Yury Rudov	Soviet Union
2nd place, silver medalist(s)		Edoardo Mangiarotti; Luigi Carpaneda; Alberto Pellegrino; Mario Curletto; Aldo Aureggi	Italy
3rd place, bronze medalist(s)		Jürgen Brecht; Tim Gerresheim; Eberhard Mehl; Jürgen Theuerkauff	United Team of Germany

The men's team foil was one of eight fencing events on the fencing at the 1960 Summer Olympics programme. It was the tenth appearance of the event. The competition was held on 2 September 1960. 77 fencers from 16 nations competed.

== Competition format ==
The competition combined pool play with knockout rounds, a change from prior tournaments which used pool play all the way through. The first round consisted of pools, with the 18 teams entered in the competition divided into 6 pools of 3 teams. The top 2 teams in each pool after a round-robin advanced. Sweden and Spain did not start, leaving 2 of the pools with only 2 teams. The 12 teams remaining after the pool play competed in a four-round single-elimination bracket, with a bronze medal match between the semifinal losers. The winners of the first 4 pools received byes in the round of 16.

Each team match consisted of each of the four fencers on one team facing each fencer on the other team, for a maximum of 16 total bouts. An 8–8 tie would be resolved by touches received. Bouts were to 5 touches. Only as much fencing was done as was necessary to determine pool placement (in the first round) or the winning team (in the knockout rounds), so not all matches went to the full 16 bouts but instead stopped early (typically when one team had 9 bouts won).

== Rosters ==
Australia

- Brian McCowage
- Michael Sichel
- Zoltan Okalyi
- David McKenzie

Belgium

- Jacques Debeur
- André Verhalle
- François Dehez
- Franck Delhem

France

- Jacky Courtillat
- Jean-Claude Magnan
- Guy Barrabino
- Claude Netter
- Christian d'Oriola

Germany

- Jürgen Brecht
- Tim Gerresheim
- Eberhard Mehl
- Jürgen Theuerkauff

Great Britain

- Bill Hoskyns
- Allan Jay
- Ralph Cooperman
- Angus McKenzie
- René Paul

Hungary

- Ferenc Czvikovszki
- Jenő Kamuti
- Mihály Fülöp
- László Kamuti
- József Gyuricza
- József Sákovics

Italy

- Edoardo Mangiarotti
- Luigi Carpaneda
- Alberto Pellegrino
- Mario Curletto
- Aldo Aureggi

Japan

- Heizaburo Okawa
- Mitsuyuki Funamizu
- Tsugeo Ozawa
- Kazuhiko Tabuchi

Luxembourg

- Jean Link
- Robert Schiel
- Édouard Didier
- Roger Theisen
- Jean-Paul Olinger

Morocco

- Charles El-Gressy
- Abderraouf El-Fassy
- Abderrahman Sebti
- Abbes Harchi
- Mohamed Ben Joullon
- Jacques Ben Gualid

Poland

- Egon Franke
- Ryszard Parulski
- Jan Różycki
- Ryszard Kunze
- Witold Woyda

Romania

- Iosif Szilaghi
- Sorin Poenaru
- Attila Csipler
- Tănase Mureșanu

Soviet Union

- Viktor Zhdanovich
- Yury Sisikin
- Mark Midler
- German Sveshnikov
- Yury Rudov

United Arab Republic

- Farid El-Ashmawi
- Moustafa Soheim
- Mohamed Gamil El-Kalyoubi
- Ahmed El-Hamy El-Husseini
- Sameh Abdel Rahman
- Ahmed Zein El-Abidin

United States

- Eugene Glazer
- Hal Goldsmith
- Joseph Paletta, Jr.
- Albie Axelrod
- Daniel Bukantz

Venezuela

- Luis García
- Freddy Quintero
- Augusto Gutiérrez
- Jesús Gruber

== Results ==
=== Round 1 ===
==== Pool A ====
Luxembourg defeated Australia, as did France. This eliminated Australia; Luxembourg and France faced off to determine their placing within the group. Luxembourg took first in the group with a win over France.

Pos	Team	W	L	BW	BL	Qual.	FRA	LUX	AUS
1	France	2	0	20	9	Q		9–6	11–3
2	Luxembourg	1	1	16	15	Q	6–9		10–6
3	Australia	0	2	9	21		3–11	6–10	

Source: Official Report, p. 778

==== Pool B ====
Sweden was entered in this pool but did not start. Both Hungary and the United Arab Republic were guaranteed advancement; they faced each other to determine placing. Hungary were the winners.

Pos	Team	W	L	BW	BL	Qual.	HUN	UAR
1	Hungary	1	0	9	2	Q		9–2
2	United Arab Republic	0	1	2	9	Q	2–9	

Source: Official Report, p. 779

==== Pool C ====
Spain was entered in this pool but did not start. Both Italy and Romania were guaranteed advancement; they faced off to determine placing. Italy prevailed.

Pos	Team	W	L	BW	BL	Qual.	ITA	ROU
1	Italy	1	0	9	2	Q		9–2
2	Romania	0	1	2	9	Q	2–9	

Source: Official Report, p. 780

==== Pool D ====
Belgium defeated Japan, followed by the Soviet Union also defeating Japan. This eliminated Japan; Belgium and the Soviet Union faced off to determine placing. The Soviets won.

Pos	Team	W	L	BW	BL	Qual.	URS	BEL	JPN
1	Soviet Union	2	0	24	2	Q		9–1	15–1
2	Belgium	1	1	11	15	Q	1–9		10–6
3	Japan	0	2	7	25		1–15	6–10	

Source: Official Report, p. 780

==== Pool E ====
Great Britain and then Germany each defeated Venezuela, eliminating the South Americans. Germany won over Great Britain to determine placement.

Pos	Team	W	L	BW	BL	Qual.	EUA	GBR	VEN
1	United Team of Germany	2	0	23	7	Q		9–5	14–2
2	Great Britain	1	1	19	11	Q	5–9		14–2
3	Venezuela	0	2	4	28		2–14	2–14	

Source: Official Report, p. 781

==== Pool F ====
Poland defeated Morocco, followed by the United States defeating Morocco. The United States then defeated Poland to determine placement within the group.

Pos	Team	W	L	BW	BL	Qual.	USA	POL	MAR
1	United States	2	0	25	4	Q		9–4	16–0
2	Poland	1	1	20	9	Q	4–9		16–0
3	Morocco	0	2	0	32		0–16	0–16	

Source: Official Report, p. 782

=== Elimination rounds ===
Round of 16
E1	United Team of Germany	9
C2	Romania	2
F2	Poland	9
B2	United Arab Republic	3
E2	Great Britain	9
D2	Belgium	2
F1	United States	9
A2	Luxembourg	5

Quarter-finals
United Team of Germany	8 (61)*
A1	France	8 (61)
Poland	6
D1	Soviet Union	9
Great Britain	7
B1	Hungary	9
United States	0
C1	Italy	9

Semi-finals
United Team of Germany	3
Soviet Union	9
Hungary	8 (68)
Italy	8 (65)

Finals
Soviet Union	9
Italy	4
Third place
United Team of Germany	9
Hungary	5

- Germany and France tied on both bouts and touches received, so a one-bout fence-off was conducted. Germany's Gerresheim defeated France's d'Oriola, 5–0.

== Final classification ==
Rank	Nation
1st place, gold medalist(s)	Soviet Union
2nd place, silver medalist(s)	Italy
3rd place, bronze medalist(s)	United Team of Germany
4	Hungary
5	France
5	Great Britain
5	Poland
5	United States
9	Belgium
9	Luxembourg
9	Romania
9	United Arab Republic
13	Australia
13	Japan
13	Morocco
13	Venezuela
