= Fencing at the 1964 Summer Olympics – Men's team foil =

Men's team foil at the Games of the XVIII Olympiad
- Venue: Waseda Memorial Hall
- Dates: October 15 – 16
- Competitors: 78 from 16 nations

Medalists
1st place, gold medalist(s)		Viktor Zhdanovich; Yury Sisikin; Mark Midler; German Sveshnikov; Yury Sharov	Soviet Union
2nd place, silver medalist(s)		Zbigniew Skrudlik; Witold Woyda; Egon Franke; Ryszard Parulski; Jan Różycki	Poland
3rd place, bronze medalist(s)		Jean-Claude Magnan; Daniel Revenu; Jacky Courtillat; Pierre Rodocanachi; Christian Noël	France

The men's team foil was one of eight fencing events on the fencing at the 1964 Summer Olympics programme. It was the eleventh appearance of the event. The competition was held on October 15 – 16 1964. 78 fencers from 16 nations competed.

== Results ==
=== Round 1 ===
Ties between teams were broken by individual victories (in parentheses), then by touches received.

Pool A
1.	France	2-1 (30)	Q2
2.	Romania	2-1 (28)	Q2
3.	United States	2-1 (22)
4.	Egypt	0-3 (5)

Pool B
1.	Poland	2-0 (22)	Q2
2.	Italy	2-0 (22)	Q2
3.	Great Britain	0-2 (12)
4.	Australia	0-2 (6)

Pool C
1.	Japan	2-0 (22)	Q2
2.	Poland	2-0 (22)	Q2
3.	Egypt	0-2 (9)
4.	South Korea	0-2 (3)

Pool D
1.	Soviet Union	2-0 (26)	Q2
2.	United Team of Germany	2-0 (23)	Q2
3.	Iran	0-2 (2)
4.	Colombia	0-2 (0)

=== Championship rounds ===
Quarter-finals
France	9
Italy	5
Soviet Union	9
United Team of Germany	3
Poland	9
Romania	2
Japan	9
Hungary	7

Semi-finals
France	6
Soviet Union	9
Poland	9
Japan	4

Final
Soviet Union	9
Poland	7
Third place
France	9
Japan	4

==== Fifth place semifinal ====
Fifth place semifinals
Romania	9
Hungary	5
United Team of Germany	9
Italy	5

Fifth place match
Romania	8
United Team of Germany	8

== Rosters ==
Argentina

- Adolfo Bisellach
- Jesús Taboada
- Alberto Lanteri
- Orlando Nannini
- Félix Galimi

Australia

- Gerard Tubier
- David McKenzie
- John Douglas
- Brian McCowage
- Ivan Lund

Colombia

- Ignacio Posada
- Dibier Tamayo
- Emilio Echeverry
- Ernesto Sastre
- Humberto Posada

Egypt

- Moustafa Soheim
- Farid El-Ashmawi
- Ahmed El-Hamy El-Husseini
- Mohamed Gamil El-Kalyoubi
- Sameh Abdel Rahman

France

- Jean-Claude Magnan
- Daniel Revenu
- Jacky Courtillat
- Pierre Rodocanachi
- Christian Noël

Great Britain

- Bill Hoskyns
- Allan Jay
- Sandy Leckie
- Ralph Cooperman
- Derrick Cawthorne

Germany

- Jürgen Brecht
- Dieter Wellmann
- Eberhard Mehl
- Tim Gerresheim
- Jürgen Theuerkauff

Hungary

- Jenő Kamuti
- László Kamuti
- József Gyuricza
- Sándor Szabó
- Béla Gyarmati

Iran

- Houshmand Almasi
- Nasser Madani
- Shahpour Zarnegar
- Bizhan Zarnegar

Italy

- Gianguido Milanesi
- Pasquale La Ragione
- Arcangelo Pinelli
- Nicola Granieri
- Mario Curletto

Japan

- Kazuhiko Tabuchi
- Fujio Shimizu
- Kazuo Mano
- Heizaburo Okawa
- Sosuke Toda

Poland

- Zbigniew Skrudlik
- Witold Woyda
- Egon Franke
- Ryszard Parulski
- Jan Różycki

Romania

- Tănase Mureșanu
- Ion Drîmbă
- Iuliu Falb
- Ștefan Haukler
- Attila Csipler

South Korea

- Sin Du-Ho
- Han Myeong-Seok
- Kim Man-Sig
- Kim Chang-Hwan

Soviet Union

- Viktor Zhdanovich
- Yury Sisikin
- Mark Midler
- German Sveshnikov
- Yury Sharov

United States

- Larry Anastasi
- Eugene Glazer
- Herbert Cohen
- Albie Axelrod
- Ed Richards

== Sources ==
- Tokyo Organizing Committee (1964). The Games of the XVIII Olympiad: Tokyo 1964, vol. 2.
