= Fencing at the 1964 Summer Olympics – Men's foil =

Men's foil at the Games of the XVIII Olympiad
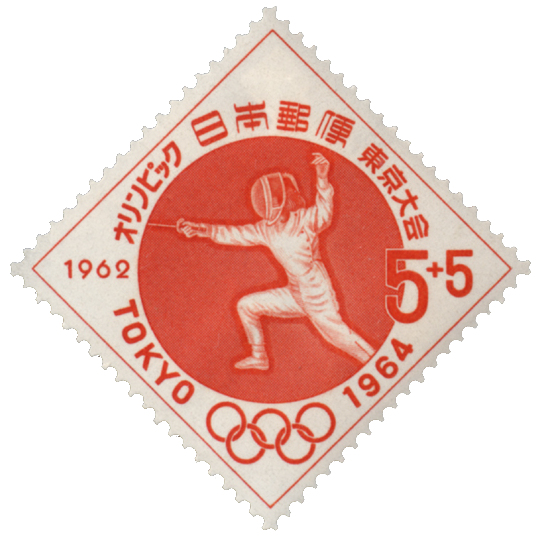
- Japanese stamp commemorating 1964 Olympic fencing
- Venue: Waseda Memorial Hall
- Dates: October 13 – 14
- Competitors: 55 from 21 nations

Medalists
1st place, gold medalist(s)		Egon Franke	Poland
2nd place, silver medalist(s)		Jean-Claude Magnan	France
3rd place, bronze medalist(s)		Daniel Revenu	France

The men's foil was one of eight fencing events on the fencing at the 1964 Summer Olympics programme. It was the fourteenth appearance of the event. The competition was held from October 13 to October 14, 1964. 55 fencers from 21 nations competed. Nations had been limited to three fencers each since 1928. The event was won by Egon Franke of Poland, the nation's first victory in the men's foil. France returned to the podium after a one-Games absence, with Jean-Claude Magnan taking silver and Daniel Revenu the bronze.

== Background ==
This was the 14th appearance of the event, which has been held at every Summer Olympics except 1908 (when there was a foil display only rather than a medal event). Five of the eight finalists from 1960 returned: gold medalist Viktor Zhdanovich of the Soviet Union, bronze medalist Albie Axelrod of the United States, fourth-place finisher Witold Woyda of Poland, fifth-place finisher Mark Midler of the Soviet Union, and seventh-place finisher Bill Hoskyns of Great Britain. Jean-Claude Magnan of France was the reigning world champion. The previous two world champions, Ryszard Parulski of Poland and German Sveshnikov, were also competing in Tokyo.

Iran, Malaysia, and South Korea each made their debut in the men's foil. The United States made its 13th appearance, most of any nation, having missed only the inaugural 1896 competition.

== Competition format ==
The 1964 tournament introduced a hybrid pool-play and knockout format. The competition began with two rounds of pool play. In each round, the fencers were divided into pools to play a round-robin within the pool. Bouts were to five touches. Barrages were used to break ties necessary for advancement. The competition then shifted to knockout rounds. These rounds used a single-elimination tournament format to reduce the remaining field from 24 to 16, then from 16 to 8, then from 8 to 4. There were also classification semifinals and a fifth-place match for the quarterfinal losers. Bouts in these knockout rounds were to 10 touches. The four quarterfinal winners then resumed pool play once again for the final.

Standard foil rules were used, including that touches had to be made with the tip of the foil, the target area was limited to the torso, and priority determined the winner of double touches.

- Round 1: There were 9 pools of 6 or 7 fencers each. The top 4 fencers in each pool advanced to round 2.
- Round 2: There were 6 pools of 6 fencers each. The top 4 fencers in each pool advanced to the knockout rounds.
- Knockout rounds: The 24 fencers were seeded into a truncated single-elimination tournament. Eight received byes into the round of 16. Three knockout rounds were held, finishing with the quarterfinals.
- Classification: There were knockout-style classification matches for 5th place (two 5th–8th semifinals and a 5th/6th match).
- Final: The final pool had 4 fencers.

== Schedule ==
All times are Japan Standard Time (UTC+9)

Date	Time	Round
Tuesday, 13 October 1964	8:30	Round 1 Round 2
Wednesday, 14 October 1964	17:30; 17:30	Round of 24; Round of 16; Quarterfinals; Classification 5–8; Final

== Results ==
=== Round 1 ===
==== Pool A ====
The three-way tie for third-place resulted in a barrage in the first pool. After each fencer went 1-1 in the barrage, touches received was used to break the tie. Herb Cohen's 6 gave him the win over McKenzie's 7 and Elkalyoubi's 8; Cohen received third place. The tie-breaker then went back to head-to-head results between the two remaining fencers in the barrage to assign fourth place; Elkalyoubi had defeated McKenzie in their bout (and, incidentally, had defeated him in the main pool as well), so he placed fourth and advanced while McKenzie was eliminated.

Rank	Fencer	Nation	Wins	Losses	Notes
1	Herman Sveshnikov	Soviet Union	5	0	Q
2	Jean Claude Magnan	France	4	1	Q
3	Herbert Cohen	United States	2	3	B
3	M. Elkalyoubi	Egypt	2	3	B
3	David McKenzie	Australia	2	3	B
6	Hahn Myung Seok	South Korea	0	5	

Barrage A

Rank	Fencer	Nation	Wins	Losses	Notes
3	Herbert Cohen	United States	1	1	Q
4	M. Elkalyoubi	Egypt	1	1	Q
5	David McKenzie	Australia	1	1	

==== Pool B ====
The second pool required no barrage; ties within the top four were nominally broken by touches against (15-18 in favor of Sehem in the top two places) and then touches scored (21-18 for Okawa after he and Curletto tied at 18-18 in touches against).

Rank	Fencer	Nation	Wins	Losses	Notes
1	Mostafa Sehem	Egypt	4	1	Q
2	Ryszard Parulski	Poland	4	1	Q
3	Heisaburō Ōkawa	Japan	3	2	Q
4	Mario Curletto	Italy	3	2	Q
5	Enrique Penabella	Cuba	1	4	
6	Ivan Lund	Australia	0	5	

==== Pool C ====
Rank	Fencer	Nation	Wins	Losses	Notes
1	Kazuo Mano	Japan	5	0	Q
2	Egon Franke	Poland	4	1	Q
3	Jozsef Gyuricza	Hungary	3	2	Q
4	Allan Jay	Great Britain	2	3	Q
5	Shin Doo Ho	South Korea	1	4	
6	Jesus Taboada	Argentina	0	5	

==== Pool D ====
Rank	Fencer	Nation	Wins	Losses	Notes
1	Mark Midler	Soviet Union	5	0	Q
2	Julius Brecht	United Team of Germany	4	1	Q
3	Sandor Szabo	Hungary	3	2	Q
4	Nasser Madani	Iran	2	3	Q
5	Emilio Echeverri	Colombia	1	4	
6	Robert Foxcroft	Canada	0	5	

==== Pool E ====
Touches against were 12-16-19 to break the three-way tie for second place.

Rank	Fencer	Nation	Wins	Losses	Notes
1	Nicola Granieri	Italy	5	0	Q
2	Daniel Revenu	France	3	2	Q
3	Sameh Abdelrahman	Egypt	3	2	Q
4	Kazuhiko Tabuchi	Japan	3	2	Q
5	John Andru	Canada	1	4	
6	Houshmand Almasi	Iran	0	5	

==== Pool F ====
Rank	Fencer	Nation	Wins	Losses	Notes
1	Jacky Courtillat	France	5	0	Q
2	Ion Drîmbă	Romania	4	1	Q
3	Henry Hoskyns	Great Britain	3	2	Q
4	Michael Ryan	Ireland	2	3	Q
5	Orlando Nannini	Argentina	1	4	
6	Bijan Zarnegar	Iran	0	5	

==== Pool G ====
Rank	Fencer	Nation	Wins	Losses	Notes
1	Jeno Kamuti	Hungary	5	0	Q
2	Roland Losert	Austria	4	1	Q
3	Alexander Leckie	Great Britain	3	2	Q
4	Ignacio Posada	Colombia	2	3	Q
5	Edwin Richards	United States	1	4	
6	J. Bouchier-Hayes	Ireland	0	5	

==== Pool H ====
Rank	Fencer	Nation	Wins	Losses	Notes
1	Ștefan Haukler	Romania	6	0	Q
2	Witold Woyda	Poland	5	1	Q
3	Pasquale la Ragione	Italy	4	2	Q
4	Tim Gerresheim	United Team of Germany	3	3	Q
5	Brian McCowage	Australia	2	4	
6	Didier Tamayo	Colombia	1	5	
7	Ronnie Theseira	Malaysia	0	6	

==== Pool I ====
Touches against were 14-18-20 to break the three-way tie for second and 22-24 to break the two-way tie for fifth.

Rank	Fencer	Nation	Wins	Losses	Notes
1	Tănase Mureșanu	Romania	4	1	Q
2	Albert Axelrod	United States	3	2	Q
3	Dieter Schmitt	United Team of Germany	3	2	Q
4	Victor Zhdanovich	Soviet Union	3	2	Q
5	Kim Man Shik	South Korea	1	4	
6	Adolfo Bisellach	Argentina	1	4	

=== Round 2 ===
==== Pool A ====
Touches against were 16-16-19 to break the three-way tie for second into second/third and fourth places, with touches scored 23-22 to separate second and third.

Rank	Fencer	Nation	Wins	Losses	Notes
1	Herman Sveshnikov	Soviet Union	4	1	Q
2	Ion Drîmbă	Romania	3	2	Q
3	Witold Woyda	Poland	3	2	Q
4	Mario Curletto	Italy	3	2	Q
5	Jozsef Gyuricza	Hungary	2	3	
6	Alexander Leckie	Great Britain	0	5	

==== Pool B ====
Touches against broke the tie for second and third, with 14-16. Since the tie for fourth and fifth determined advancement, another bout was fenced. Tabuchi, who had won the main-pool bout, defeated Sehem again in the barrage to win a qualification spot.

Rank	Fencer	Nation	Wins	Losses	Notes
1	Mark Midler	Soviet Union	5	0	Q
2	Henry Hoskyns	Great Britain	3	2	Q
3	Egon Franke	Poland	3	2	Q
4	Mostafa Sehem	Egypt	2	3	B
4	Kazuhiko Tabuchi	Japan	2	3	B
6	Michael Ryan	Ireland	0	5	

Barrage B

Rank	Fencer	Nation	Wins	Losses	Notes
4	Kazuhiko Tabuchi	Japan	1	0	Q
5	Mostafa Sehem	Egypt	0	1	

==== Pool C ====
The three-way tie for first was broken by touches against (16-18-20), but the three-way tie for fourth required a barrage. Elkalyoubi, fencing in the first two bouts of the barrage, won both to clinch advancement and make a bout between Granieri and Haukler unnecessary. Their main-pool touches against (17-19) decided the fifth and sixth places.

Rank	Fencer	Nation	Wins	Losses	Notes
1	Roland Losert	Austria	3	2	Q
2	Dieter Schmitt	United Team of Germany	3	2	Q
3	Victor Zhdanovich	Soviet Union	3	2	Q
4	M. Elkalyoubi	Egypt	2	3	B
4	Nicola Granieri	Italy	2	3	B
4	Ștefan Haukler	Romania	2	3	B

Barrage C

Rank	Fencer	Nation	Wins	Losses	Notes
4	M. Elkalyoubi	Egypt	2	0	Q
5	Ștefan Haukler	Romania	0	1	
6	Nicola Granieri	Italy	0	1	

==== Pool D ====
A three-way tie for third place required a barrage, with two fencers advancing and the third eliminated. Cohen, who had beaten Muresan but lost to Mano in the main pool, won both of his barrage bouts to take third place. Mano defeated Muresan in the other barrage bout to revenge his loss in the main pool and take fourth, qualifying for the third round.

Rank	Fencer	Nation	Wins	Losses	Notes
1	Tim Gerreshim	United Team of Germany	5	0	Q
2	Daniel Revenu	France	3	2	Q
3	Herbert Cohen	United States	2	3	B
3	Kazuo Mano	Japan	2	3	B
3	Tănase Mureșanu	Romania	2	3	B
6	Pasquale la Ragione	Italy	1	4	

Barrage D

Rank	Fencer	Nation	Wins	Losses	Notes
3	Herbert Cohen	United States	2	0	Q
4	Kazuo Mano	Japan	1	1	Q
5	Tănase Mureșanu	Romania	0	2	

==== Pool E ====
The fifth pool resulted in a four-way tie for third place, out of which two fencers would advance and two would be eliminated. The barrage resulted in two fencers going 2-1 to advance (with Jay's 20-21 edge in main-pool touches against giving him third place) and two going 1-2 (Parulski took fifth with 19 touches against in the main pool to Courtillat's 21) to be knocked out.

Rank	Fencer	Nation	Wins	Losses	Notes
1	Albert Axelrod	United States	4	1	Q
2	Sando Szabor	Hungary	3	2	Q
3	Jacky Courtillat	France	2	3	B
3	Allan Jay	Great Britain	2	3	B
3	Nasser Madani	Iran	2	3	B
3	Ryszard Parulski	Poland	2	3	B

Barrage E

Rank	Fencer	Nation	Wins	Losses	Notes
3	Allan Jay	Great Britain	2	1	Q
4	Nasser Madani	Iran	2	1	Q
5	Ryszard Parulski	Poland	1	2	
6	Jacky Courtillat	France	1	2	

==== Pool F ====
Since the three-way tie for second didn't matter for qualification, it was broken by touches against. Magnan's 13 gave him second place, while Brecht and Kamuti were still tied at 17. They maintained their tie even through touches scored at 20, so both received third place in the pool.

Rank	Fencer	Nation	Wins	Losses	Notes
1	Heisaburō Ōkawa	Japan	4	1	Q
2	Jean Claude Magnan	France	3	2	Q
3	Julius Brecht	United Team of Germany	3	2	Q
3	Jeno Kamuti	Hungary	3	2	Q
5	Sameh Abdelrahman	Egypt	2	3	
6	Ignacio Posada	Colombia	0	5	

=== Knockout rounds ===
The winner of each group advanced to the final pool, while the runner-up moved into a 5th-place semifinal.

==== Group 1 ====
Round of 24
Ion Drîmbă (ROU)	10
Nasser Madani (IRI)	4
Sandor Szabo (HUN)	10
Dieter Schmitt (EUA)	2

Round of 16
Roland Losert (AUT)	10
Ion Drîmbă (ROU)	6
Sandor Szabo (HUN)	10
Mark Midler (URS)	8

Quarterfinals
Roland Losert (AUT)	10
Sandor Szabo (HUN)	9

==== Group 2 ====
Round of 24
Daniel Revenu (FRA)	10
Allan Jay (GBR)	2
Kazuo Mano (JPN)	10
M. Elkalyoubi (EGY)	8

Round of 16
Daniel Revenu (FRA)	10
Witold Woyda (POL)	6
Tim Gerresheim (EUA)	10
Kazuo Mano (JPN)	4

Quarterfinals
Daniel Revenu (FRA)	10
Tim Gerresheim (EUA)	5

==== Group 3 ====
Round of 24
Okawa Heisaburo (JPN)	10
Herbert Cohen (USA)	4
Victor Zhdanovich (URS)	10
Julius Brecht (EUA)	6

Round of 16
Jean Claude Magnan (FRA)	10
Okawa Heisaburo (JPN)	7
Jeno Kamuti (HUN)	10
Victor Zhdanovich (URS)	9

Quarterfinals
Jean Claude Magnan (FRA)	10
Jeno Kamuti (HUN)	7

==== Group 4 ====
Round of 24
Albert Axelrod (USA)	10
Tabuchi Kozuhiko (JPN)	5
Henry Hoskyns (GBR)	10
Mario Curletto (ITA)	6

Round of 16
Egon Franke (POL)	10
Albert Axelrod (USA)	9
Henry Hoskyns (GBR)	10
Herman Sveshnikov (URS)	8

Quarterfinals
Egon Franke (POL)	10
Henry Hoskyns (GBR)	4

=== Fifth place classification ===
Fifth place semifinals
Sandor Szabo (HUN)	6
Tim Gerresheim (EUA)	10
Jeno Kamuti (HUN)	10
Henry Hoskyns (GBR)	6

Fifth place match
Tim Gerresheim (EUA)	4
Jeno Kamuti (HUN)	10

=== Final ===
Rank	Fencer	Nation	Wins	Losses
1st place, gold medalist(s)	Egon Franke	Poland	3	0
2nd place, silver medalist(s)	Jean Claude Magnan	France	2	1
3rd place, bronze medalist(s)	Daniel Revenu	France	1	2
4	Roland Losert	Austria	0	3

== Sources ==
- Tokyo Organizing Committee (1964). The Games of the XVIII Olympiad: Tokyo 1964, vol. 2.
