= Fencing at the 1960 Summer Olympics =

Fencing at the Games of the XVII Olympiad

At the 1960 Summer Olympics in Rome, eight events in fencing were contested. Men competed in both individual and team events for each of the three weapon types (épée, foil and sabre), but women competed only in foil events.

== Medal summary ==
=== Men's events ===
Games	Gold	Silver	Bronze
individual épée	Giuseppe Delfino; Italy	Allan Jay; Great Britain	Bruno Khabarov; Soviet Union
team épée	Italy; Giuseppe Delfino; Alberto Pellegrino; Carlo Pavesi; Edoardo Mangiarotti; Fiorenzo Marini; Gianluigi Saccaro	Great Britain; Allan Jay; Michael Howard; John Pelling; Henry Hoskyns; Raymond Harrison; Michael Alexander	Soviet Union; Valentin Chernikov; Guram Kostava; Arnold Chernushevich; Bruno Khabarov; Aleksandr Pavlovsky
individual foil	Viktor Zhdanovich; Soviet Union	Yury Sisikin; Soviet Union	Albert Axelrod; United States
team foil	Soviet Union; Viktor Zhdanovich; Mark Midler; Yuri Rudov; Yury Sisikin; German Sveshnikov	Italy; Alberto Pellegrino; Luigi Carpaneda; Mario Curletto; Aldo Aureggi; Edoardo Mangiarotti	United Team of Germany; Jürgen Theuerkauff; Tim Gerresheim; Eberhard Mehl; Jürgen Brecht
individual sabre	Rudolf Kárpáti; Hungary	Zoltán Horváth; Hungary	Wladimiro Calarese; Italy
team sabre	Hungary; Tamas Mendelenyi; Rudolf Kárpáti; Pál Kovács; Zoltán Horváth; Gabor Delneki; Aladár Gerevich	Poland; Andrzej Piątkowski; Emil Ochyra; Wojciech Zabłocki; Jerzy Pawłowski; Ryszard Zub; Marian Kuszewski	Italy; Wladimiro Calarese; Giampaolo Calanchini; Pierluigi Chicca; Roberto Ferrari; Mario Ravagnan

=== Women's events ===
Games	Gold	Silver	Bronze
individual foil	Adelheid Schmid; United Team of Germany	Valentina Rastvorova; Soviet Union	Maria Vicol; Romania
team foil	Soviet Union; Valentina Prudskova; Aleksandra Zabelina; Lyudmila Shishova; Tatyana Petrenko; Galina Gorokhova; Valentina Rastvorova	Hungary; Györgyi Szekely-Marvalics; Ildikó Újlaky-Rejtő; Magdolna Nyari-Kovacs; Katalin Juhasz-Nagy; Lidia Dömölki-Sakovics	Italy; Bruna Colombetti; Velleda Cesari; Claudia Pasini; Irene Camber; Antonella Ragno-Lonzi

== Medal table ==
Rank	Nation	Gold	Silver	Bronze	Total
1	Soviet Union	3	2	2	7
2	Hungary	2	2	0	4
3	Italy	2	1	3	6
4	United Team of Germany	1	0	1	2
5	Great Britain	0	2	0	2
6	Poland	0	1	0	1
7	Romania	0	0	1	1
7	United States	0	0	1	1
Totals (8 entries)		8	8	8	24

== Participating nations ==
A total of 344 fencers (266 men and 78 women) from 42 nations competed at the Rome Games:

- Argentina (6)
- Australia (11)
- Austria (9)
- Belgium (15)
- Bulgaria (2)
- Canada (1)
- Colombia (2)
- Cuba (1)
- Denmark (1)
- Finland (6)
- France (21)
- United Team of Germany (19)
- Great Britain (18)
- Hungary (21)
- Indonesia (4)
- Ireland (6)
- Israel (2)
- Italy (20)
- Japan (5)
- Lebanon (4)
- Luxembourg (10)
- Mexico (8)
- Monaco (2)
- Morocco (7)
- Netherlands (5)
- New Zealand (1)
- Norway (1)
- Poland (21)
- Portugal (9)
- Puerto Rico (1)
- Romania (15)
- Soviet Union (21)
- Spain (11)
- Sweden (7)
- Switzerland (7)
- Tunisia (4)
- United Arab Republic (6)
- United States (21)
- Uruguay (2)
- Venezuela (8)
- Vietnam (1)
- Yugoslavia (2)
