= Fencing at the 1956 Summer Olympics – Men's foil =

Fencing at the Olympics

Men's foil at the Games of the XVI Olympiad
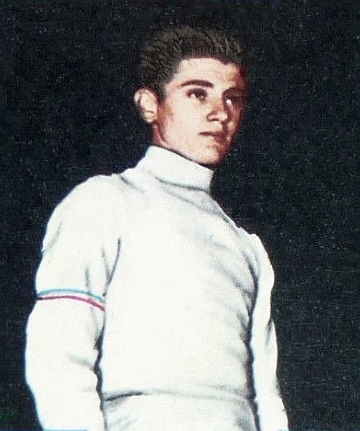
- Christian d'Oriola (1948)
- Venue: St Kilda Town Hall
- Dates: 26 November
- Competitors: 32 from 14 nations

Medalists
1st place, gold medalist(s)		Christian d'Oriola	France
2nd place, silver medalist(s)		Giancarlo Bergamini	Italy
3rd place, bronze medalist(s)		Antonio Spallino	Italy

The men's foil was one of seven fencing events on the fencing at the 1956 Summer Olympics programme. It was the twelfth appearance of the event. The competition was held on 26 November 1956. 32 fencers from 14 nations competed. Nations had been limited to three fencers each since 1928. The event was won by Christian d'Oriola of France, the second man to successfully defend an Olympic title in the foil and second man to win three medals in the event (he had a silver medal in 1948 along with gold in 1952). It was France's third consecutive and seventh overall victory in the event. As in 1952, the next two spots were taken by Italians, this time Giancarlo Bergamini and Antonio Spallino.

== Background ==
This was the 12th appearance of the event, which has been held at every Summer Olympics except 1908 (when there was a foil display only rather than a medal event). Four of the nine finalists from 1952 returned: gold medalist (and 1948 silver medalist) Christian d'Oriola of France, silver medalist Edoardo Mangiarotti of Italy, fourth-place finisher Jacques Lataste of France, and eighth-place finisher Giancarlo Bergamini of Italy. Once again, the French and Italian teams were favored. D'Oriola had added two more world championships since the Helsinki Games and come in second at the third, behind József Gyuricza of Hungary.

The United Team of Germany made its debut in the men's foil. The United States made its 11th appearance, most of any nation, having missed only the inaugural 1896 competition.

== Competition format ==
With a smaller than usual field, the event used a three-round format. In each round, the fencers were divided into pools to play a round-robin within the pool. Bouts were to five touches. Barrages were used to break ties necessary for advancement (touches against were the first tie-breaker used to give ranks when the rank did not matter). However, only as much fencing was done as was necessary to determine advancement, so some bouts never occurred if the fencers advancing from the pool could be determined. Standard foil rules were used, including that touches had to be made with the tip of the foil, the target area was limited to the torso, and priority determined the winner of double touches.

- Quarterfinals: There were 4 pools of 8 fencers each. The top 4 fencers in each quarterfinal advanced to the semifinals.
- Semifinals: There were 2 pools of 8 fencers each. The top 4 fencers in each semifinal advanced to the final.
- Final: The final pool had 8 fencers.

== Schedule ==
All times are Australian Eastern Standard Time (UTC+10)

Date	Time	Round
Monday, 26 November 1956	8:00; 15:00	Quarterfinals; Semifinals; Final

== Results ==
=== Quarterfinals ===
The top 4 fencers in each pool advanced to the semifinals.

==== Quarterfinal 1 ====
Rank	Fencer	Nation	Wins	Losses	TF	TA	Notes
1	József Gyuricza	Hungary	6	0	30	13	Q
2	Yury Rudov	Soviet Union	5	1	27	15	Q
3	Antonio Spallino	Italy	5	2	30	18	Q
4	Allan Jay	Great Britain	4	3	27	15	Q
5	Harold Goldsmith	United States	3	4	22	23	
6	Benito Ramos	Mexico	2	4	19	28	
7	Pablo Uribe	Colombia	1	6	13	34	
8	Masayuki Sano	Japan	0	6	8	30	

==== Quarterfinal 2 ====
Stratmann won the barrage vs. Mangiarotti, 5–4.

Rank	Fencer	Nation	Wins	Losses	TF	TA	Notes
1	Michael Sichel	Australia	5	2	32	19	Q
2	Iuri Osip'ovi	Soviet Union	5	2	29	21	Q
3	Albie Axelrod	United States	5	2	31	26	Q
4	Günter Stratmann	United Team of Germany	4	3	30	25	Q
5	Edoardo Mangiarotti	Italy	4	3	22	23	
6	François Dehez	Belgium	3	4	21	28	
7	Jacques Lataste	France	1	6	22	32	
8	Gabriel Blando	Colombia	1	6	18	34	

==== Quarterfinal 3 ====
Delaunois beat Paul, who beat Bergamini, who beat Delaunois, in the barrage, all at 5–4; touches against in the main pool were used to break the tie.

Rank	Fencer	Nation	Wins	Losses	TF	TA	Notes
1	Claude Netter	France	5	1	29	17	Q
2	Brian McCowage	Australia	5	1	25	17	Q
3	Raymond Paul	Great Britain	4	3	31	22	Q
4	Giancarlo Bergamini	Italy	4	3	23	23	Q
5	Ghislain Delaunois	Belgium	4	3	26	27	
6	Lajos Somodi, Sr.	Hungary	2	4	20	24	
7	Santiago Massini	Argentina	1	5	19	26	
8	Byron Krieger	United States	1	6	13	30	

==== Quarterfinal 4 ====
Rank	Fencer	Nation	Wins	Losses	TF	TA	Notes
1	Mark Midler	Soviet Union	6	1	31	19	Q
2	Christian d'Oriola	France	5	2	30	15	Q
3	René Paul	Great Britain	5	2	27	18	Q
4	André Verhalle	Belgium	5	2	30	19	Q
5	Mihály Fülöp	Hungary	4	3	29	24	
6	David McKenzie	Australia	2	5	17	32	
7	Roland Asselin	Canada	0	6	13	30	
8	Emilio Echeverry	Colombia	0	6	10	30	

=== Semifinals ===
The top 4 fencers in each pool advanced to the final.

==== Semifinal 1 ====
Rank	Fencer	Nation	Wins	Losses	TF	TA	Notes
1	Claude Netter	France	5	2	31	15	Q
2	Antonio Spallino	Italy	5	1	27	16	Q
3	Raymond Paul	Great Britain	5	2	31	19	Q
4	Mark Midler	Soviet Union	5	2	27	22	Q
5	André Verhalle	Belgium	3	3	21	20	
6	Yury Rudov	Soviet Union	2	4	14	28	
7	Albie Axelrod	United States	1	5	17	27	
8	Michael Sichel	Australia	0	7	13	35	

==== Semifinal 2 ====
The three-way barrage for 3rd and 4th places resulted in Stratmann losing twice to be eliminated. Gyuricza and Jay did not face each other in the barrage, with their nominal 3rd and 4th place ranks (not relevant to advancement) determined on touches against in the main pool.

Rank	Fencer	Nation	Wins	Losses	TF	TA	Notes
1	Christian d'Oriola	France	6	1	32	14	Q
2	Giancarlo Bergamini	Italy	5	2	26	25	Q
3	József Gyuricza	Hungary	4	3	31	23	Q
4	Allan Jay	Great Britain	4	3	31	24	Q
5	Günter Stratmann	United Team of Germany	4	3	28	27	
6	Brian McCowage	Australia	2	5	22	32	
7	Iuri Osip'ovi	Soviet Union	1	5	13	28	
8	René Paul	Great Britain	1	5	19	29	

=== Final ===
The two Italian fencers faced off in a barrage to determine silver and bronze medals. Bergamini won, 5–4 (he had also beaten Spallino by that score in the main pool).

Rank	Fencer	Nation	Wins	Losses	TF	TA
1st place, gold medalist(s)	Christian d'Oriola	France	6	1	33	17
2nd place, silver medalist(s)	Giancarlo Bergamini	Italy	5	2	33	26
3rd place, bronze medalist(s)	Antonio Spallino	Italy	5	2	30	21
4	Allan Jay	Great Britain	4	3	29	26
5	József Gyuricza	Hungary	3	4	23	23
6	Claude Netter	France	3	4	21	25
7	Mark Midler	Soviet Union	2	5	19	30
8	Raymond Paul	Great Britain	0	7	15	35
