= Colombia at the 1964 Summer Olympics =

- IOC code: COL
- NOC: Colombian Olympic Committee

in Tokyo
- Competitors: 20 in 6 sports
- Flag bearer: Emilio Echeverry
- Medals: Gold 0 Silver 0 Bronze 0 Total 0

Summer Olympics appearances (overview)
- 1932; 1936; 1948; 1952; 1956; 1960; 1964; 1968; 1972; 1976; 1980; 1984; 1988; 1992; 1996; 2000; 2004; 2008; 2012; 2016; 2020; 2024

Colombia competed at the 1964 Summer Olympics in Tokyo, Japan. It was their sixth appearance ath the Olympics, after debuting in 1932. 20 competitors, all men, took part in 19 events in 6 sports.

== Cycling ==
Eight cyclists represented Colombia in 1964.

Individual road race

- Martín Rodríguez
- Pablo Hernández
- Rubén Darío Gómez
- Mario Escobar

Team time trial

- Rubén Darío Gómez
- Pablo Hernández
- Javier Suárez
- Pedro Sánchez

Sprint

- Mario Vanegas
- Eduardo Bustos

1000m time trial

- Eduardo Bustos

Individual pursuit

- Martín Rodríguez

== Diving ==
Men

| Athlete | Event | Preliminary | | Final | | | |
| Athlete | Event | Points | Rank | Points | Rank | Total | Rank |
|---|---|---|---|---|---|---|---|
| Diego Henao | 10 m platform | 76.91 | 29 | Did not advance | | | |

== Fencing ==
Five fencers, all men, represented Colombia in 1964.

Men's foil

- Ignacio Posada
- Emilio Echeverry
- Dibier Tamayo

Men's team foil

- Ignacio Posada, Dibier Tamayo, Emilio Echeverry, Ernesto Sastre, Humberto Posada

Men's épée

- Dibier Tamayo
- Ernesto Sastre
- Emilio Echeverry

Men's team épée

- Emilio Echeverry, Ernesto Sastre, Dibier Tamayo, Humberto Posada

Men's sabre

- Ignacio Posada
- Emilio Echeverry
- Humberto Posada

== Shooting ==
One shooter represented Colombia in 1964.

25 m pistol

- Álvaro Clopatofsky

== Swimming ==
Men

| Athlete | Event | Heat | | Final | |
| Athlete | Event | Time | Rank | Time | Rank |
|---|---|---|---|---|---|
| Julio Arango | 400 m freestyle | 4:35.1 | 33 | Did not advance | |
| Julio Arango | 1500 m freestyle | 17:59.1 | 14 | Did not advance | |

== See also ==
- Sports in Colombia
