= United Arab Republic at the 1964 Summer Olympics =

- Flag of the United Arab Republic
- IOC code: RAU (UAR used at these Games)
- NOC: Egyptian Olympic Committee
- Website: www.egyptianolympic.org (in Arabic and English)

in Tokyo
- Competitors: 73 in 9 sports
- Medals: Gold 0 Silver 0 Bronze 0 Total 0

Summer Olympics appearances (overview)
- 1960; 1964

Other related appearances
- Egypt (1912–pres.); Syria (1948–pres.)

Egypt, as the United Arab Republic, competed at the 1964 Summer Olympics in Tokyo, Japan. 73 competitors, all men, took part in 35 events in 9 sports.

== Fencing ==
Five fencers, all men, represented Egypt in 1964.

Men's foil

- Mohamed Gamil El-Kalyoubi
- Moustafa Soheim
- Sameh Abdel Rahman

Men's team foil

- Moustafa Soheim, Farid El-Ashmawi, Ahmed El-Hamy El-Husseini, Mohamed Gamil El-Kalyoubi, Sameh Abdel Rahman

== Shooting ==
Six shooters represented Egypt in 1964.

25 m pistol

- Abdallah Zohdy

50 m pistol

- Hassan El-Sayed Attia

50 m rifle, prone

- Mohamed Amin Fikry
- Mohamed Sami El-Khatib

Trap

- Mohamed Mehrez
- Ahmed Kadry Genena
