= Raoul Barouch =

Jewish Tunisian fencer

Personal information
- Full name: Raoul Meir Barouch
- Nickname: Lolo
- Born: 12 May 1916 Tunis, Tunisia
- Died: Unknown
- Height: 177 cm (5 ft 10 in)
- Weight: 74 kg (163 lb)

Sport
- Country: Tunisia
- Sport: Fencing
- Events: Foil, sabre, épée
- Club: Cercle d'Escrime Noë Martinelli
- Coached by: Lucien Lavaire, Georges Savard

Raoul Meir Barouch (Arabic: راؤول مئير باروش, Hebrew: ראול מאיר ברוך; 12 May 1916 – ?) was a Tunisian fencer. A member of the Cercle d'Escrime Noë Martinelli (Noë Martinelli Fencing Club), he competed in all three fencing disciplines: foil, sabre and épée. Barouch won many national championships in Tunisia and also was a multi-time champion at the North African Fencing Championships between 1950 and 1960. He competed in three events at the 1960 Summer Olympics. Barouch served as the flag bearer for Tunisia at the 1960 Olympics, the only time a Jew ever held this role for an Arab country.

== Biography ==
Barouch was born on 12 May 1916 in Tunis, Tunisia, and was Jewish. He had an older brother, Albert, also a fencer who won national championships and medals at the North African championships. He and his brother were among the most prominent Jewish sportsmen in Tunisia during their period of activity. In addition to competing, Barouch was active in the governance of youth and local tournaments.

Barouch, who was nicknamed "Lolo", competed in all three fencing disciplines: foil, sabre and épée. He and his brother were members of the Cercle d'Escrime Noë Martinelli (Noë Martinelli Fencing Club) and won club and local tournaments, including the Vega Challenge in 1953. Barouch received instruction under Lucien Lavaire, a North African champion, and later under fencing master Georges Savard. During his career, Barouch was described by Tunisie-France as a likeable figure and an "athletic fencer with an excellent temperament", while being "lightning-fast" when competing. Petin matin noted he was "friendly but always fiery", while La Dépêche tunisienne stated that he possessed "extraordinary grit and unwavering determination ... his hand [is] powerful, and his jumping ability highly effective".

Barouch was a decorated participant at the Tunisian national championships, winning many titles and reaching the finals in different years in all three disciplines. During his career, he won the national foil championship in at least 1947, 1948, 1952, 1953, and 1954, and the sabre title in 1950 and 1955. (Note: Multiple references: for foil in 1947, 1948, 1952, 1953, and 1954; for sabre in 1950 and 1955.) He won the 1950 title despite missing some competitions that year due to a health issue. Barouch sometimes competed against his brother at the national tournaments, finishing as runner-up to Albert in the sabre competitions in 1951 and 1954.

In 1948, Barouch competed at a tournament between teams representing the French and the Italian, as a member of the French team. He participated at the French championships in 1951. In 1955, he competed at the Victory Cup tournament in Palermo between the top fencers of Tunisia and Sicily, winning one sabre fight and losing one as Sicily won the competition. Barouch also competed many times at the North African Fencing Championships, starting by 1948. He won various titles at the tournament between 1950 and 1960. Among other results, he was the sabre champion in 1951, foil runner-up in 1953, and foil champion in 1954, competing against other fencers from Morocco and Algeria. (Note: Multiple references: 1951, 1953, and 1954.) Although Albert had won the 1951 Tunisian sabre title and thus qualified for the North African Championships, he let Barouch take his place that year.

At age 44, Barouch was selected to represent Tunisia at the 1960 Summer Olympics in the individual events in all three fencing disciplines. This was the first time Tunisia had participated at the Olympics. In the foil event, he was eliminated in the first round after placing seventh and last in his pool with a record of 1–5, with his only win coming against the Mexican William Fajardo. In the épée event, Barouch finished fifth out of six in his pool and was eliminated, winning one bout – against Charles El-Gressy – and losing four. Lastly, in the sabre event, he compiled a record of 1–4 to finish fifth out of sixth in his pool, only defeating Emilio Echeverry. At the Olympics, Barouch served as the Tunisian flag bearer during the opening ceremony. This remains the only time that a Jewish person has served as the flag bearer for an Arab country at the Olympics.

There are claims that Barouch died in 2006 in Jerusalem, but they are unverified.
