= Kamuti =

Kamuti is a surname. Notable people with the surname include:

- Jenő Kamuti (born 1937), Hungarian foil fencer
- László Kamuti (1940–2020), Hungarian fencer
