= Somodi =

Somodi is a Hungarian surname. Notable people with the surname include:

- Bence Somodi (born 1988), Hungarian footballer
- István Somodi (1885–1963), Hungarian athlete
- Lajos Somodi Sr. (1928–2012), Hungarian fencer; father of Lajos Somodi Jr. (born 1953), also a Hungarian fencer
- Maja Somodi (born 2004), Hungarian short-track speed skater
