= Yury Sisikin =

Soviet fencer (1937–2025)

Personal information
- Born: 15 May 1937 Saratov, Russian SFSR, Soviet Union
- Died: 11 November 2025 (aged 88) Saratov, Russia

Sport
- Sport: Fencing
Medal record
Men's fencing
Representing Soviet Union
Olympic Games
Gold medal – first place	1960 Rome	Team foil
Gold medal – first place	1964 Tokyo	Team foil
Silver medal – second place	1960 Rome	Individual foil
Silver medal – second place	1968 Mexico City	Team foil
World Championships
Gold medal – first place	1959 Budapest	Team foil
Gold medal – first place	1961 Turin	Team foil
Gold medal – first place	1962 Buenos Aires	Team foil
Gold medal – first place	1965 Paris	Team foil
Gold medal – first place	1966 Moscow	Team foil
Silver medal – second place	1958 Philadelphia	Team foil
Summer Universiade
Gold medal – first place	1959 Turin	Team foil
Silver medal – second place	1959 Turin	Individual foil
Silver medal – second place	1961 Sofia	Team foil
Bronze medal – third place	1961 Sofia	Individual foil

Yury Fyodorovich Sisikin (Russian: Юрий Фёдорович Сисикин; 15 May 1937 – 11 November 2025) was a Soviet fencer. He won two gold and two silver medals at three different Olympic Games.

Sisikin died on 11 November 2025, at the age of 88.
