= Eugene Glazer =

Eugene Glazer may refer to:

- Eugene Glazer (fencer), American fencer
- Eugene Robert Glazer, American actor
