= Egon Franke =

Egon Franke may refer to:

- Egon Franke (politician) (1913–1995), German politician
- Egon Franke (fencer) (1935–2022), Polish Olympic fencer
