= Gene Glazer =

Gene Glazer may refer to:

- Gene Glazer (fencer) (born 1939), American Olympic competitor in 1960 and 1964
- Gene Glazer (actor) (born 1942), American performer; also credited as Eugene Robert Glazer
