= Funamizu =

Funamizu (written: 船水) is a Japanese surname. Notable people with the surname include:

- Mitsuyuki Funamizu (船水 光行, born 1933), Japanese fencer
- Noritaka Funamizu (船水 紀孝, born 1965), Japanese video game designer
