= Pierre Rodocanachi =

French fencer (born 1938)

Personal information
- Born: 2 October 1938 (age 87) Paris, France

Sport
- Sport: Fencing
Medal record
Representing France
Olympic Games
| Bronze medal – third place | 1964 Tokyo | Team foil |
Mediterranean Games
| Bronze medal – third place | 1967 Tunis | Individual foil |
World Championships
| Bronze medal – third place | 1963 Gdansk | Team foil |
| Bronze medal – third place | 1965 Paris | Team foil |
Summer Universiade
| Gold medal – first place | 1965 Budapest | Team foil |
| Bronze medal – third place | 1959 Turin | Team foil |
| Bronze medal – third place | 1967 Tokyo | Team foil |

Pierre André Emmanuel Rodocanachi (born 2 October 1938) is a French fencer. He won a bronze medal in the team foil event at the 1964 Summer Olympics. He also competed at the 1967 Mediterranean Games where he won a bronze medal in the individual foil event.
