= Yury Sharov =

Soviet fencer (1939–2021)

Personal information
- Born: 22 April 1939 Saratov, Russian SFSR, Soviet Union
- Died: 12 December 2021 (aged 82) Saratov, Russia

Sport
- Sport: Fencing
Medal record
Men's fencing
Representing Soviet Union
Olympic Games
Gold medal – first place	1964 Tokyo	Foil, team
Silver medal – second place	1968 Mexico City	Foil, team

Yury Sharov (Russian: Юрий Дмитриевич Шаров; 22 April 1939 – 12 December 2021) was a Soviet fencer. He won a gold medal in the team foil event at the 1964 Summer Olympics and a silver in the same event at the 1968 Summer Olympics.

Sharov died on 12 December 2021, at the age of 82.
