= Zoltán Horváth (fencer) =

Hungarian fencer (1937–2025)

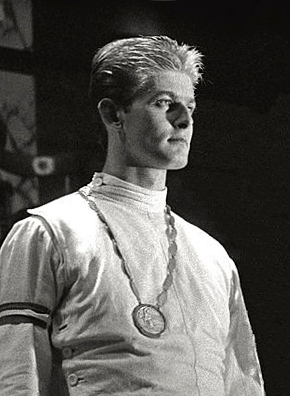
- Horváth at the 1960 Olympics

Personal information
- Born: 12 March 1937 Balatonfüred, Hungary
- Died: 12 June 2025 (aged 88) Budapest, Hungary
- Height: 1.83 m (6 ft 0 in)
- Weight: 75 kg (165 lb)

Sport
- Sport: Fencing
- Club: Vörös Meteor, Budapest
Medal record
Representing Hungary
Olympic Games
Gold medal – first place	1960 Rome	Sabre team
Silver medal – second place	1960 Rome	Sabre individual
World Championships
Gold medal – first place	1957 Paris	Sabre team
Gold medal – first place	1958 Philadelphia	Sabre team
Gold medal – first place	1962 Buenos Aires	Sabre individual
Gold medal – first place	1966 Moscow	Sabre team
Silver medal – second place	1959 Budapest	Sabre team
Silver medal – second place	1962 Buenos Aires	Sabre team
Bronze medal – third place	1961 Turin	Sabre team
Bronze medal – third place	1965 Paris	Sabre individual
Bronze medal – third place	1966 Moscow	Sabre individual

Zoltán Horváth (12 March 1937 – 12 June 2025) was a Hungarian sabre fencer. At the 1960 Olympics, he won the gold medal in the team competition, and the individual silver medal behind teammate Rudolf Kárpáti. Horváth also took part in the 1964 Olympics, placing fifth in the team competition.

At world championships, his greatest success came in 1962, when he won the individual competition and placed second with the team. Horváth had already won two gold medals in the team competitions of the 1957 and 1958 world championships and gained a third in 1966.

Horváth died on 12 June 2025 in Budapest, at the age of 88.
