= Yury Ivanov (fencer) =

Soviet fencer (born 1935)

Personal information
- Born: 1935

Sport
- Sport: Fencing

Yury Ivanov (Russian: Юрий Иванов; born 1935) is a Soviet Olympic fencer. He competed in the team foil event at the 1956 Summer Olympics.
