= Fencing at the 1961 Summer Universiade =

Fencing events were contested at the 1961 Summer Universiade in Sofia, Bulgaria.

== Medal overview ==
=== Men's events ===
Event	Gold	Silver	Bronze
Individual foil	Jenő Kamuti (HUN)	Viktor Zhdanovich (URS)	Yury Sisikin (URS)
Team foil	Hungary (HUN)	Soviet Union (URS)	Poland (POL)
Individual épée	Bogdan Gonsior (POL)	László Lendvai (HUN)	Rudiger Wurtz (FRG)
Team épée	Italy (ITA)	Switzerland (SUI)	West Germany (FRG)
Individual sabre	Peter Bakonyi (HUN)	Nugzar Asatiani (URS)	Tibor Pézsa (HUN)
Team sabre	Hungary (HUN)	Soviet Union (URS)	Bulgaria (BUL)

=== Women's events ===
Event	Gold	Silver	Bronze
Individual foil	Heidi Schmid (FRG)	Olga Szabo (ROM)	Valentina Prudskova (URS)
Team foil	Romania (ROM)	Soviet Union (URS)	West Germany (FRG)

== Medal table ==
Rank	Nation	Gold	Silver	Bronze	Total
1	Hungary (HUN)	4	1	1	6
2	Romania (ROM)	1	1	0	2
3	West Germany (FRG)	1	0	3	4
4	Poland (POL)	1	0	1	2
5	Italy (ITA)	1	0	0	1
6	Soviet Union (URS)	0	5	2	7
7	Switzerland (SUI)	0	1	0	1
8	Bulgaria (BUL)	0	0	1	1
Totals (8 entries)		8	8	8	24
