= Valentina Prudskova =

Soviet fencer (1938–2020)

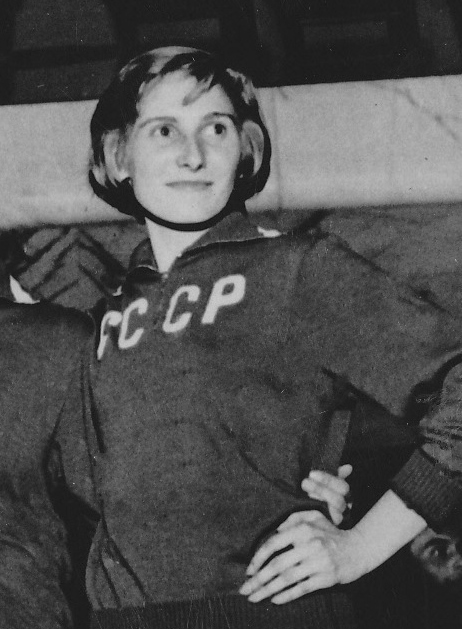
- Prudskova at the 1960 Olympics

Personal information
- Born: 27 December 1938 Yershov, Russian SFSR, Soviet Union
- Died: 23 August 2020 (aged 81) Saratov, Russia
- Height: 1.59 m (5 ft 3 in)
- Weight: 51 kg (112 lb)

Sport
- Sport: Fencing
- Club: Burevestnik Saratov
- Coached by: Mikhail Sazonov
- Retired: 1968
Medal record
Representing Soviet Union
Olympic Games
Gold medal – first place	1960 Rome	Team
Silver medal – second place	1964 Tokyo	Team
World Fencing Championships
Gold medal – first place	1958 Philadelphia	Team
Gold medal – first place	1961 Turin	Team
Gold medal – first place	1965 Paris	Team
Gold medal – first place	1966 Moscow	Team
Silver medal – second place	1959 Budapest	Team
Silver medal – second place	1962 Buenos Aires	Team
Bronze medal – third place	1965 Paris	Individual
Summer Universiade
Silver medal – second place	1961 Sofia	Team
Bronze medal – third place	1961 Sofia	Individual

Valentina Aleksandrovna Prudskova (Russian: Валентина Александровна Прудскова; 27 December 1938 – 23 August 2020) was a Soviet fencer. She won gold in the women's team foil event at the 1960 Summer Olympics and a silver in the same event at the 1964 Summer Olympics.

Prudskova's mother, Zinaida Nikolaevna Prudskova, was a farmer and housewife. Her father, Aleksandr Petrovich Prudskov, worked at railways and fought in the Winter War and World War II; he died of pneumonia in 1950, aged 40. Shortly after that, his family moved from Yershov to Saratov, where Prudskova started training in fencing, together with her cousin. Her career advanced in 1954 when she won her first national title.

Prudskova was a member of the Soviet foil team from 1957 to 1966. During those years she won four gold and two silver team medals at the world championships, as well as one individual bronze. In 1962 she graduated from Saratov State Technical University with a degree in metal processing and then until 1969 worked at a metalworking plant in Saratov. After that she coached fencing at a sport school. She was awarded the Order of the Badge of Honour and Medal "For Labour Valour".

Prudskova had a daughter, Marina, who worked as an arts teacher.
