= Sosuke Toda =

Japanese fencer

Personal information
- Born: 11 January 1941 (age 85)

Sport
- Sport: Fencing

Sosuke Toda (戸田 壮介, Toda Sōsuke; born 11 January 1941) is a Japanese fencer. He competed in the team foil event at the 1964 Summer Olympics.
