= Jean Cerrottini =

Swiss fencer

Personal information
- Born: 19 October 1938 (age 87) Lausanne, Switzerland

Sport
- Sport: Fencing

Jean Cerrottini (born 19 October 1938) is a Swiss fencer. He competed in the individual foil event at the 1960 Summer Olympics.
