= Dieter Schmitt =

German fencer

Personal information
- Born: 3 May 1940 (age 86) Offenbach am Main, Germany

Sport
- Sport: Fencing

Dieter Schmitt (born 3 May 1940) is a German fencer. He represented the United Team of Germany at the 1964 Summer Olympics in the individual foil event.
