= Manuel Borrego =

Portuguese fencer (born 1934)

Personal information
- Born: 2 December 1934 (age 91) Penamacor, Portugal

Sport
- Sport: Fencing

Manuel Joaquim Valente Borrego (born 2 December 1934) is a Portuguese fencer. He competed in the individual foil and team épée events at the 1960 Summer Olympics.
