= Enrique González (fencer) =

Spanish fencer (born 1933)

Personal information
- Born: 3 November 1933 (age 92) Melilla, Spain

Sport
- Sport: Fencing
Medal record
Mediterranean Games
Silver medal – second place	1959 Beirut	Team sabre

Enrique González (born 3 November 1933) is a Spanish fencer. He competed in the individual foil event at the 1960 Summer Olympics. He won a silver medal at the 1959 Mediterranean Games in the team sabre event.
