= Joaquín Moya =

Spanish fencer (1932–2011)

Personal information
- Full name: Joaquín Moya Rodríguez
- Born: 21 January 1932 Alcalá de Henares, Madrid, Spain
- Died: 27 May 2011 (aged 79)

Sport
- Sport: Fencing
Medal record
Mediterranean Games
Bronze medal – third place	1959 Beirut	Team épée

Joaquín Moya Rodríguez (Note: In this Spanish name, the first or paternal surname is Moya and the second or maternal family name is Rodríguez.) (21 January 1932 – 27 May 2011) was a Spanish fencer. He competed in the individual foil and team épée events at the 1960 Summer Olympics. He also competed at the 1959 Mediterranean Games where he won a bronze medal in the team épée event.
