= Sorin Poenaru =

Romanian fencer

Personal information
- Born: 10 September 1938 (age 87) Câmpina, Romania

Sport
- Sport: Fencing

Sorin Poenaru (born 10 September 1938) is a Romanian fencer. He competed in the team foil event at the 1960 Summer Olympics.
