= Raúl Cicero =

Mexican fencer (1926–2021)

Personal information
- Born: 31 December 1926 San Salvador, El Salvador
- Died: 15 June 2021 (aged 94)

Sport
- Sport: Fencing

Raúl Cicero (31 December 1926 – 15 June 2021) was a Mexican fencer. He competed in the individual foil event at the 1960 Summer Olympics. Cicero died on 15 June 2021, at the age of 94.
