= Jean Khayat =

Tunisian fencer (born 1942)

Personal information
- Born: 3 May 1942 (age 84) Tunis, Tunisia

Sport
- Sport: Fencing

Jean Khayat (Arabic: جان خياط; born 3 May 1942) is a Tunisian fencer. He competed in the individual foil and sabre events at the 1960 Summer Olympics, winning one of nine bouts.
