= 1965 World Fencing Championships =

International fencing competition

1965 World Championships in Fencing
- Host city: Paris, France

The 1965 World Fencing Championships were held in Paris, France.

== Medal table ==
* Host nation (France)

Rank	Nation	Gold	Silver	Bronze	Total
1	Soviet Union (URS)	4	0	4	8
2	France (FRA)*	2	1	2	5
3	Hungary (HUN)	1	1	1	3
4	Poland (POL)	1	1	0	2
5	Great Britain (GBR)	0	2	0	2
5	Romania (ROU)	0	2	0	2
7	Italy (ITA)	0	1	1	2
Totals (7 entries)		8	8	8	24

== Medal summary ==
=== Men's events ===
Event	Gold	Silver	Bronze
Individual Foil	(France) Jean-Claude Magnan	(France) Daniel Revenu	(Soviet Union) German Sveshnikov
Team Foil	Soviet Union	(Polish People's Republic) Poland	France
Individual Sabre	(Polish People's Republic) Jerzy Pawłowski	(Hungarian People's Republic) Miklós Meszéna	(Hungarian People's Republic) Zoltán Horváth
Team Sabre	Soviet Union	Italy	France
Individual Épée	(Hungarian People's Republic) Zoltán Nemere	(United Kingdom) Bill Hoskyns	(Soviet Union) Guram Kostava
Team Épée	France	(United Kingdom) Great Britain	Soviet Union

=== Women's events ===
Event	Gold	Silver	Bronze
Individual Foil	(Soviet Union) Galina Gorokhova	(Romania) Olga Szabó-Orbán	(Soviet Union) Valentina Prudskova
Team Foil	Soviet Union	Romania	Italy
