= Jean-Paul Olinger =

Luxembourgish fencer (born 1943)

Personal information
- Born: 17 March 1943 (age 83) Luxembourg City, Luxembourg
- Height: 5 ft 6 in (168 cm)

Sport
- Country: Luxembourg
- Sport: Fencing

Jean-Paul Olinger (born 17 March 1943) is a Luxembourgish fencer. He competed in the team foil event at the 1960 Summer Olympics.
