= Pedro Marçal =

Portuguese fencer

Personal information
- Born: 23 January 1938 (age 88) Marinha Grande

Sport
- Sport: Fencing

Pedro Marçal (born 23 January 1938) is a Portuguese fencer. He competed in the individual foil event at the 1960 Summer Olympics.
