= Viktor Zhdanovich =

Soviet fencer (born 1938)

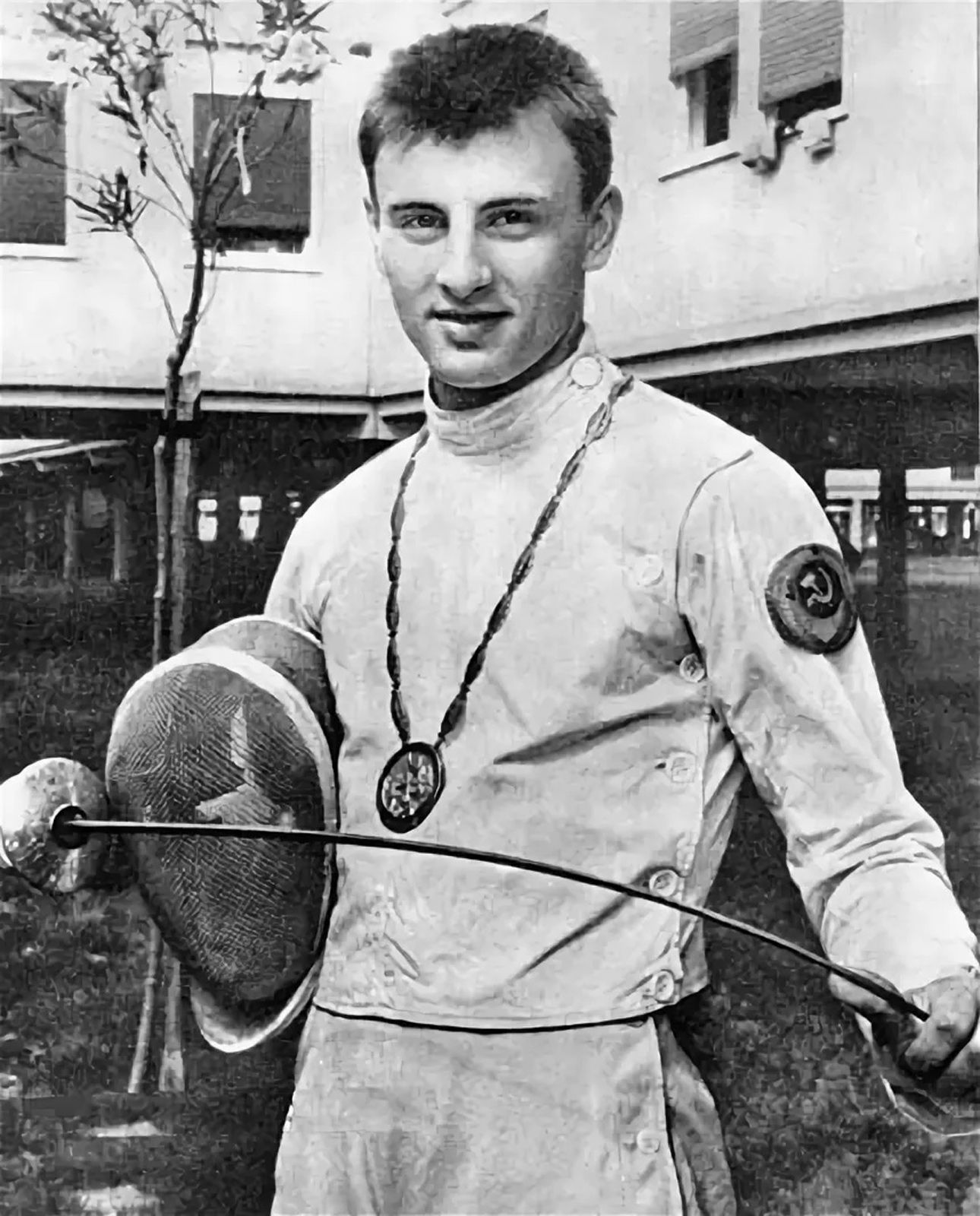

Personal information
- Born: Viktor Frantsevich Zhdanovich; 27 January 1938 (age 88) Leningrad, Russian SFSR, Soviet Union
- Height: 182 cm (6 ft)
- Weight: 78 kg (172 lb)

Sport
- Sport: Fencing
Medal record
Men's fencing
Representing Soviet Union
Olympic Games
Gold medal – first place	1960 Rome	Team foil
Gold medal – first place	1960 Rome	Individual foil
Gold medal – first place	1964 Tokyo	Team foil
World Championships
Gold medal – first place	1959 Budapest	Team foil
Gold medal – first place	1961 Turin	Team foil
Gold medal – first place	1962 Buenos Aires	Team foil
Gold medal – first place	1963 Gdansk	Team foil
Summer Universiade
Gold medal – first place	1959 Turin	Team foil
Silver medal – second place	1961 Sofia	Individual foil
Silver medal – second place	1961 Sofia	Team foil
Bronze medal – third place	1963 Porto Alegre	Team foil

Viktor Frantsevich Zhdanovich (Russian: Виктор Францевич Жданович) (born 27 January 1938) is a Soviet and Russian fencer.

He was World Champion four times (1959, 1960, 1961 and 1963) and twice Olympic Champion (1960) in the foil individual events, and in 1964 in the foil team gold medal.
