= Brian Hamilton (fencer) =

Irish fencer (1937–2026)

Personal information
- Born: 13 November 1937 Maharashtra, India
- Died: 29 July 2026 (aged 88)

Sport
- Sport: Fencing

Brian Hamilton (13 November 1937 – 29 July 2026) was an Irish fencer. He competed in the individual foil and team épée events at the 1960 Summer Olympics.
