= Aldo Aureggi =

Italian fencer (1931–2020)

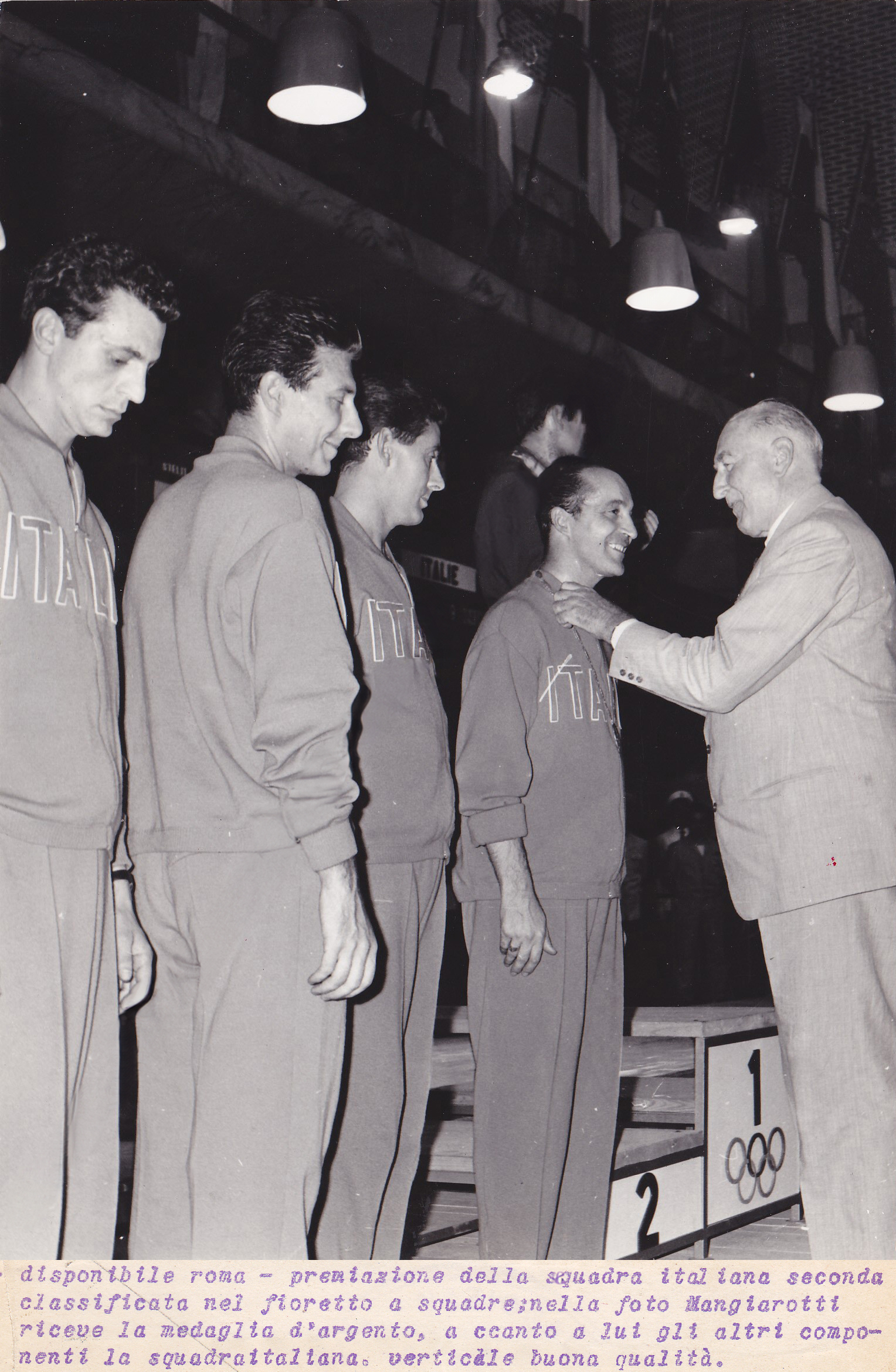

Personal information
- Born: 6 October 1931 Rome, Italy
- Died: 21 August 2020 (aged 88)

Sport
- Sport: Fencing
Medal record
Men's fencing
Representing Italy
Olympic Games
Silver medal – second place	1960 Rome	Foil, team

Aldo Aureggi (6 October 1931 – 21 August 2020) was an Italian fencer. He won a silver medal in the team foil event at the 1960 Summer Olympics.
