= Humberto Posada =

Colombian fencer

Personal information
- Born: 5 September 1922 Manizales, Colombia

Sport
- Sport: Fencing

Humberto Posada (born 5 September 1922) is a Colombian former fencer. He competed in the team foil, team épée and individual sabre events at the 1964 Summer Olympics.
