= Freddy Quintero =

Venezuelan fencer (born 1938)

Personal information
- Born: 24 May 1938 (age 88) Caracas, Venezuela

Sport
- Sport: Fencing

Freddy Quintero (born 24 May 1938) is a Venezuelan fencer. He competed in the individual and team foil events at the 1960 Summer Olympics.
