= Jean Link =

Luxembourgish fencer (1938–2020)

Personal information
- Born: 3 September 1938 Luxembourg, Luxembourg
- Died: 4 June 2020 (aged 81)
- Height: 172 cm (5 ft 8 in)

Sport
- Country: Luxemburg
- Sport: Fencing

Achievements and titles
- Olympic finals: Rome 1960
- World finals: Junior World Champion 1958 and 1959

Jean Link (3 September 1938 – 4 June 2020) was a Luxembourgish Olympic fencer. He competed in the individual and team foil events at the 1960 Summer Olympics.

Link died on 4 June 2020, aged 81.
