= Egon Franke (fencer) =

Polish fencer (1935–2022)

Personal information
- Born: 23 October 1935 Gleiwitz, Germany (now Poland)
- Died: 30 March 2022 (aged 86) Turin, Italy

Sport
- Sport: Fencing
Medal record
Men's Fencing
Representing Poland
Olympic Games
Gold medal – first place	1964 Tokyo	Foil Individual
Silver medal – second place	1964 Tokyo	Foil Team
Bronze medal – third place	1968 Mexico	Foil Team

Egon Johann Franke (23 October 1935 – 30 March 2022) was a Polish fencer and Olympic champion in foil competition. He won a gold medal in the individual foil at the 1964 Summer Olympics in Tokyo. He also received a team silver medal in 1964 and a bronze medal in 1968.
