= Lajos Somodi Sr. =

Hungarian fencer (1928–2012)

Personal information
- Born: 4 December 1928 Abádszalók, Hungary
- Died: 9 May 2012 (aged 83)

Sport
- Sport: Fencing
Medal record
Men's fencing
Representing Hungary
Olympic Games
Bronze medal – third place	1956 Melbourne	Foil, team

Lajos Somodi Sr. (4 December 1928 – 9 May 2012) was a Hungarian foil fencer. He won a bronze medal in the team foil event at the 1956 Summer Olympics.

His son Lajos Somodi Jr (born 1953) competed as a fencer for Hungary in the 1976 Summer Olympics.
