= William Fajardo =

Mexican fencer (1929–2002)

Personal information
- Born: William Ruy Fajardo Pérez; 15 October 1929 Mérida, Yucatán, Mexico
- Died: 14 June 2002 (aged 72)

Sport
- Country: Mexico
- Sport: Fencing

William Fajardo (15 October 1929 – 14 June 2002) was a Mexican épée, foil and sabre fencer. He competed at the 1960 and 1968 Summer Olympics. Between 1954 and 1962, he won four bronze medals and a silver at the Central American and Caribbean Games.
