= Luigi Carpaneda =

Italian fencer and sailor

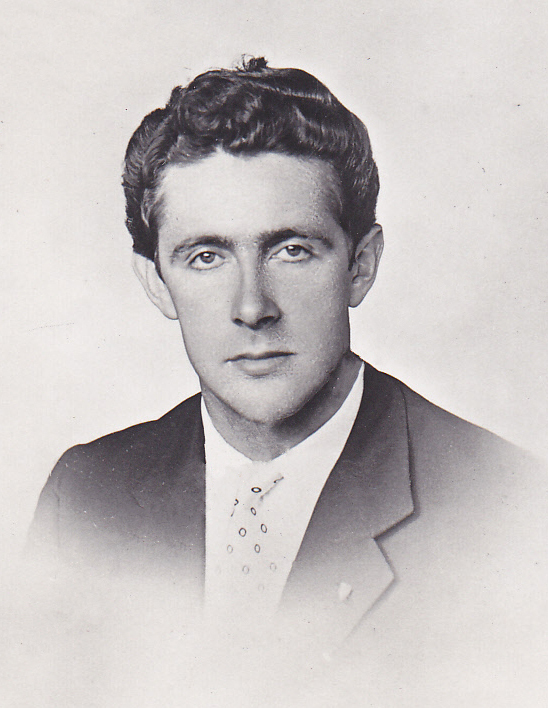

Personal information
- Born: 28 November 1925 Milan, Italy
- Died: 14 December 2011 (aged 86) Milan, Italy

Sport
- Sport: Fencing, sailing
Medal record
Fencing
Representing Italy
Olympic Games
Gold medal – first place	1956 Melbourne	Foil, team
Silver medal – second place	1960 Rome	Foil, team
World Championships
Gold medal – first place	1955 Rome	Foil, team
Bronze medal – third place	1957 Paris	Foil, team

Luigi Carpaneda (28 November 1925 – 14 December 2011) was an Italian fencer and sailor. He competed at the 1956 and 1960 Olympics and won a gold and a silver medal, respectively, in the team foil event. Besides fencing, Carpaneda was a five-time sailing captain of the Italian team at the Admiral Cup and won an international race in the 3/4 ton class in 1982 on Botta Dritta. He was killed by a car driving on red light in Milan.
