= Yury Rudov =

Soviet fencer (1931–2013)

Personal information
- Full name: Yury Vasilyevich Rudov
- Born: 17 January 1931 Taganrog, Russian SFSR, Soviet Union
- Died: 26 March 2013 (aged 82)

Sport
- Sport: Fencing
Medal record
Men's fencing
Representing Soviet Union
Olympic Games
Gold medal – first place	1960 Rome	Foil, team

Yury Vasilyevich Rudov (Russian: Юрий Васильевич Рудов, 17 January 1931 – 26 March 2013) was a Soviet fencer. He won a gold medal in the team foil event at the 1960 Summer Olympics.
