= Édouard Didier =

Luxembourgish fencer

Personal information
- Born: 2 December 1939 (age 86) Sedan, Ardennes, France

Sport
- Sport: Fencing

Édouard Didier (born 2 December 1939) is a Luxembourgish former fencer. He competed in the individual and team foil events at the 1960 Summer Olympics.
