= Jacques Debeur =

Belgian fencer

Personal information
- Born: 6 December 1936 Ixelles, Belgium
- Died: 23 July 2004 (aged 67) Brussels, Belgium

Sport
- Sport: Fencing

Jacques Debeur (6 December 1936 – 23 July 2004) was a Belgian fencer. He competed at the 1956 and 1960 Summer Olympics.
