= Franck Delhem =

Belgian fencer (1936–2020)

Personal information
- Born: 2 May 1936 Antwerp, Belgium
- Died: 20 January 2020 (aged 83)

Sport
- Sport: Fencing

Franck Delhem (2 May 1936 – 20 January 2020) was a Belgian fencer. He competed in the individual and team foil events at the 1960 Summer Olympics.
