= Jacky Courtillat =

French fencer (born 1943)

Personal information
- Born: Jacques Courtillat; 8 January 1943 (age 83) Melun, France

Sport
- Sport: Fencing
Medal record
Men's fencing
Representing France
Olympic Games
Bronze medal – third place	1964 Tokyo	Foil, team
Mediterranean Games
Bronze medal – third place	1963 Naples	Individual foil

Jacky Courtillat (born 8 January 1943) is a French fencer. He won a bronze medal in the team foil event at the 1964 Summer Olympics. He also won a bronze medal at the 1963 Mediterranean Games in the individual foil event.
