= 1962 World Fencing Championships =

International fencing competition

1962 World Championships in Fencing
- Host city: Buenos Aires, Argentina

The 1962 World Fencing Championships were held in Buenos Aires, Argentina in July 1962.

== Medal table ==
Rank	Nation	Gold	Silver	Bronze	Total
1	Hungary (HUN)	3	3	1	7
2	Soviet Union (URS)	2	2	2	6
3	Poland (POL)	1	2	1	4
4	France (FRA)	1	0	2	3
5	Romania (ROM)	1	0	0	1
6	Sweden (SWE)	0	1	0	1
7	Italy (ITA)	0	0	1	1
7	West Germany (FRG)	0	0	1	1
Totals (8 entries)		8	8	8	24

== Medal summary ==
=== Men's events ===
Event	Gold	Silver	Bronze
Individual Foil	(Soviet Union) German Sveshnikov	(Polish People's Republic) Witold Woyda	(West Germany) Jürgen Brecht
Team Foil	Soviet Union	(Hungarian People's Republic) Hungary	(Polish People's Republic) Poland
Individual Sabre	(Hungarian People's Republic) Zoltán Horváth	(Polish People's Republic) Jerzy Pawłowski	(France) Claude Arabo
Team Sabre	(Polish People's Republic) Poland	(Hungarian People's Republic) Hungary	Soviet Union
Individual Épée	(Hungarian People's Republic) István Kausz	(Hungarian People's Republic) Tamás Gábor	(France) Yves Dreyfus
Team Épée	France	Sweden	Soviet Union

=== Women's events ===
Event	Gold	Silver	Bronze
Individual Foil	(Romania) Olga Szabó-Orbán	(Soviet Union) Galina Gorokhova	(Hungarian People's Republic) Katalin Juhász
Team Foil	(Hungarian People's Republic) Hungary	Soviet Union	Italy
