= Janusz Różycki =

Polish fencer (born 1939)

Personal information
- Born: 10 May 1939 (age 87) Warsaw, Poland

Sport
- Sport: Fencing
Medal record
Men's fencing
Representing Poland
Olympic Games
Silver medal – second place	1964 Tokyo	Foil, team

Janusz Różycki (born 10 May 1939) is a Polish fencer. He won a silver medal in the team foil event at the 1964 Summer Olympics.

He is the son of Jerzy Różycki, one of the three Polish mathematicians who worked on Enigma decryption from December 1932 through at least the Phoney War (1940).
