= Luis García (fencer) =

Venezuelan fencer

Personal information
- Born: 22 August 1934 (age 91) Bolívar, Venezuela

Sport
- Sport: Fencing

Luis García (born 22 August 1934) is a Venezuelan foil and sabre fencer. He competed at the 1960 and 1968 Summer Olympics.
