= Jesús Gruber =

Venezuelan fencer (1936–2021)

Personal information
- Born: 22 May 1936 Ciudad Bolívar, Venezuela
- Died: 17 March 2021 (aged 84)

Sport
- Sport: Fencing

Jesús Gruber (22 May 1936 – 17 March 2021) was a Venezuelan fencer. He competed in the individual and team foil events at the 1960 Summer Olympics.
