= Joseph Paletta Jr. =

American fencer (born 1937)

Personal information
- Born: November 15, 1937 (age 88) New York, New York, U.S.

Sport
- Country: United States
- Sport: Fencing

Joseph Paletta Jr. (born November 15, 1937) is an American fencer. He competed in the individual and team foil events at the 1960 Summer Olympics.

== See also ==
- List of NCAA fencing champions
