= Ernesto Sastre =

Colombian fencer

Personal information
- Born: 17 December 1926 (age 99)

Sport
- Sport: Fencing

Ernesto Sastre (born 17 December 1926) is a Colombian fencer. He competed in the individual and team épée and team foil events at the 1964 Summer Olympics.
