= Jürgen Theuerkauff =

German fencer (1934–2022)

Personal information
- Born: 8 September 1934 Berlin, Germany
- Died: 5 September 2022 (aged 87) Bonn, Germany

Sport
- Sport: Fencing
Medal record
Men's fencing
Representing Germany
Olympic Games
Bronze medal – third place	1960 Rome	Foil, team

Jürgen Theuerkauff (8 September 1934 – 5 September 2022) was a German fencer. He represented the United Team of Germany in 1960 and 1964 and West Germany in 1968. He won a bronze medal in the team foil event at the 1960 Summer Olympics.
