= Ignacio Posada =

Colombian fencer

Personal information
- Born: 3 March 1935
- Died: 15 January 2015 (aged 79)

Sport
- Sport: Fencing

Ignacio Posada (3 March 1935 – 15 January 2015) was a Colombian fencer. He competed in the individual and team foil and individual sabre events at the 1964 Summer Olympics.
