= Mitsuyuki Funamizu =

Japanese fencer

Personal information
- Born: 1 July 1933 (age 93) Hirakawa, Japan

Sport
- Sport: Fencing

Mitsuyuki Funamizu (Japanese: 船水 光行; born 7 September 1933) is a Japanese foil and sabre fencer. He competed at the 1960 and 1964 Summer Olympics.
