= Michael Sichel =

Australian fencer (1934–2018)

Personal information
- Born: 3 September 1934 London, England
- Died: 19 November 2018 (aged 84)

Sport
- Sport: Fencing
Medal record
Fencing
Representing Australia
British Empire (and Commonwealth) Games
| Silver medal – second place | 1958 Cardiff | Men's Team Foil |
| Silver medal – second place | 1958 Cardiff | Men's Team Sabre |

Gerald Michael Sylvester Sichel (3 September 1934 – 19 November 2018) was an Australian fencer. He competed at the 1956 and 1960 Summer Olympics. Sichel died on 19 November 2018, at the age of 84.
