= Charles El-Gressy =

Moroccan fencer (1929–2008)

Personal information
- Born: 17 June 1929 El Jadida, Morocco
- Died: 5 September 2008 (aged 79) Le Havre, France

Sport
- Sport: Fencing

Charles El-Gressy (Arabic: تشارلز لغريسي; 17 June 1929 – 5 September 2008) was a Moroccan epée, foil and sabre fencer. He competed in three events at the 1960 Summer Olympics.
