= André Verhalle =

Belgian fencer (1924–2008)

Personal information
- Born: 24 February 1924 West Flanders, Belgium
- Died: 28 February 2008 (aged 84)

Sport
- Sport: Fencing

André Verhalle (24 February 1924 – 28 February 2008) was a Belgian fencer. He competed at the 1952, 1956 and 1960 Summer Olympics.
