= Attila Csipler =

Romanian fencer

Personal information
- Born: 17 March 1939 (age 87) Satu Mare, Romania
- Died: 1996 (aged 57–58) Germany

Sport
- Sport: Fencing

Attila Csipler (17 March 1939 – 1996) was a Romanian fencer. He competed at the 1960 and 1964 Summer Olympics.
