= Farid El-Ashmawi =

Egyptian fencer

Personal information
- Born: 29 June 1941 (age 85) Idku, Egypt

Sport
- Sport: Fencing
Medal record
Mediterranean Games
Silver medal – second place	1959 Beirut	Team foil

Farid El-Ashmawi (Arabic: فريد العشماوي; born 29 June 1941) is an Egyptian former fencer. He competed in the team foil events at the 1960 and 1964 Summer Olympics. At the 1960 Games, he represented the United Arab Republic.

He also competed at the 1959 Mediterranean Games where he won a silver medal in the team foil event.
