= Didier Tamayo =

Colombian fencer

Personal information
- Born: July 20, 1939 (age 86)

Sport
- Sport: Fencing

Didier Tamayo (born 20 July 1939) is a Colombian fencer. He competed in the individual and team foil and épée events at the 1964 Summer Olympics.
