= Eberhard Mehl =

German fencer (1935–2002)

Personal information
- Born: 20 April 1935 Cologne, Germany
- Died: 29 March 2002 (aged 66)

Sport
- Sport: Fencing
Medal record
Men's fencing
Representing Germany
Olympic Games
Bronze medal – third place	1960 Rome	Foil, team

Eberhard Mehl (20 April 1935 – 29 March 2002) was a German fencer. He won a bronze medal in the team foil event at the 1960 Summer Olympics.
