= Mihály Fülöp =

Hungarian fencer (1936–2006)

Personal information
- Born: 10 April 1936 Budapest, Hungary
- Died: 26 September 2006 (aged 70) Budapest, Hungary

Sport
- Sport: Fencing
Medal record
Men's fencing
Representing Hungary
Olympic Games
Bronze medal – third place	1956 Melbourne	Foil, team

Mihály Fülöp (10 April 1936 – 26 September 2006) was a Hungarian foil fencer. He won a bronze medal in the team foil event at the 1956 Summer Olympics.
