= Jenő Kamuti =

Hungarian fencer (born 1937)

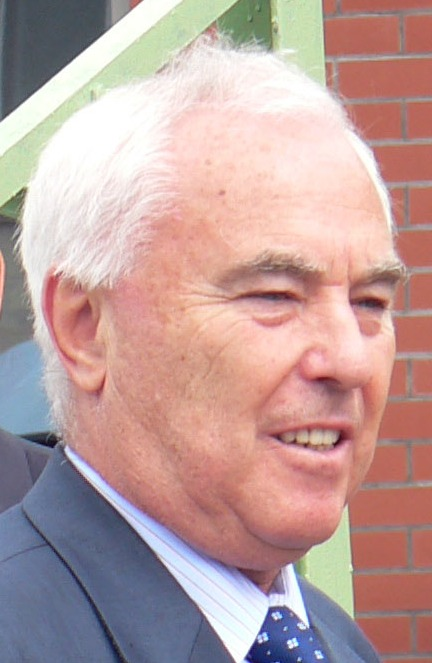
- Jenő Kamuti in 2008

Personal information
- Born: 17 September 1937 (age 88) Budapest, Hungary

Sport
- Sport: Fencing
Medal record
Representing Hungary
Olympic Games
Silver medal – second place	1968 Mexico City	Individual foil
Silver medal – second place	1972 Munich	Individual foil
World Championships
Gold medal – first place	1957 Paris	Team foil
Silver medal – second place	1961 Turin	Individual foil
Silver medal – second place	1961 Turin	Team foil
Silver medal – second place	1962 Buenos Aires	Team foil
Silver medal – second place	1966 Moscow	Team foil
Silver medal – second place	1967 Montreal	Individual foil
Silver medal – second place	1970 Ankara	Team foil
Bronze medal – third place	1959 Budapest	Team foil
Bronze medal – third place	1973 Gothenburg	Individual foil
Summer Universiade
Gold medal – first place	1961 Sofia	Individual foil
Gold medal – first place	1961 Sofia	Team foil
Gold medal – first place	1963 Porto Alegre	Individual foil
Gold medal – first place	1965 Budapest	Individual foil
Silver medal – second place	1959 Turin	Team foil
Silver medal – second place	1963 Porto Alegre	Team foil
Silver medal – second place	1963 Porto Alegre	Team épée

Dr. Jenő Kamuti (Hungarian: Kamuti Jenő, born September 17, 1937, in Budapest) is a former Hungarian foil fencer.

== Fencing career ==
Kamut was a member of the Hungarian foil team from 1956 to 1976. He was World Team Champion in foil in 1957 and University World Champion for foil in 1959, 1961, 1963, and 1965. He was team and individual World silver medalist in foil in 1961, 1963, and 1967. He won the World Cup for foil in 1973. He was awarded the Pierre de Coubertin Trophy in 1976.

At the Olympics, he twice won individual silver medals in foil, at the 1968 Summer Olympics and 1972 Summer Olympics.

== Sports Diplomacy ==
He was a member of Executive Committee of International Fencing Federation (F.I.E.) 1986–2004 and Secretary General of the F.I.E. 1992–96. President of the European Fencing Confederation 1996–2005. He has been a member of International Committee for Fair Play Administration Council since 1978 and President of the International Committee for Fair Play since 2000. He was a member of the Medical Commission of the International Olympic Committee (IOC), 1992–2005 He has been Secretary General of Hungarian Olympic Committee since 2005.

== Miscellaneous ==
He was surgeon (gastroenterologist) and Head Doctor at M.A.V. Hospital.
