= Sameh Abdel Rahman =

Egyptian fencer

Personal information
- Born: 5 October 1943 (age 82) Cairo, Egypt

Sport
- Sport: Fencing

Muhammad Sameh Abdel Rahman (Arabic: سامح عبد الرحمن; born 5 October 1943) is an Egyptian former foil fencer. He competed at the 1960 and 1964 Summer Olympics. At the 1960 Games, he represented the United Arab Republic.
