= German Sveshnikov =

Soviet fencer (1937–2003)

Personal information
- Born: 11 May 1937 Nizhny Novgorod, Russian SFSR, Soviet Union
- Died: 9 June 2003 (aged 66) Nizhny Novgorod, Russia

Sport
- Sport: Fencing
Medal record
Men's fencing
Representing Soviet Union
Olympic Games
Gold medal – first place	1960 Rome	Foil, team
Gold medal – first place	1964 Tokyo	Foil, team
Silver medal – second place	1968 Mexico City	Foil, team

German Sveshnikov (Russian: Герман Александрович Свешников; 11 May 1937 – 9 June 2003) was a Soviet fencer. He won a gold medal in the team foil event at the 1960 and 1964 Summer Olympics and a silver in the same event at the 1968 Games.
