= Kazuhiko Tabuchi =

Japanese fencer

Personal information
- Born: 5 October 1936 (age 89) Hyōgo Prefecture, Japan

Sport
- Sport: Fencing

Kazuhiko Tabuchi (Japanese: 田淵 和彦; born 5 October 1936) is a Japanese épée, foil and sabre fencer. He competed at the 1960 and 1964 Summer Olympics.
