= Tim Gerresheim =

German fencer (1939–2026)

Personal information
- Born: Timothäus Gerresheim; 24 February 1939 Berlin, Germany
- Died: 3 March 2026 (aged 87) Hamburg, Germany

Sport
- Sport: Fencing
Medal record
Men's fencing
Representing Germany
Olympic Games
Bronze medal – third place	1960 Rome	Foil, team

Timothäus Gerresheim (24 February 1939 – 3 March 2026) was a German fencer. He represented the United Team of Germany in 1960 and 1964 and West Germany in 1968. He won a bronze medal in the team foil event at the 1960 Summer Olympics.

Gerresheim died in Hamburg on 3 March 2026, at the age of 87.
