= László Kamuti =

Hungarian fencer (1940–2020)

Personal information
- Born: 13 January 1940 Budapest, Hungary
- Died: 27 August 2020 (aged 80)

Sport
- Sport: Fencing

László Kamuti (13 January 1940 – 27 August 2020) was a Hungarian foil fencer. He competed at four Olympic Games.
