= David McKenzie (fencer) =

Australian fencer (1936–1981)

Personal information
- Born: 15 July 1936 Sydney, Australia
- Died: 10 August 1981 (aged 45) Honolulu, Hawaii, United States

Sport
- Sport: Fencing
Medal record
Fencing
Representing Australia
British Empire Games
Silver medal – second place	1962 Perth	Men's Team Foil

David McKenzie (15 July 1936 – 10 August 1981) was an Australian fencer. He competed at the 1956, 1960 and 1964 Summer Olympics. He was an International Olympic Committee member from 1974 to 1981. He replaced Lewis Luxton who had resigned. McKenzie gained notoriety for encouraging Dennis Tutty to go to court to challenge rugby league's restraint of trade clauses, a case that would change professional sport in Australia.

In August 1981, while attending a meeting of National Olympic Committees in Milan, McKenzie received an urgent telegram requesting that he leave Italy and travel to the United States to meet with the organizers of the 1984 Los Angeles Olympics. On his way, he stopped over at Honolulu and was found strangled to death in a Waikiki bath house. The murder remains unsolved.

One of the officials he was to meet was William E. Simon, then president of the US Olympic Committee. Simon expressed his suspicions about the nature of McKenzie's death in his autobiography, published posthumously in 2003, claiming that foul play was involved.
