= Mario Curletto =

Italian fencer (1935–2004)

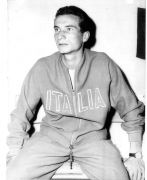

Personal information
- Born: 13 September 1935 Livorno, Italy
- Died: 22 December 2004 (aged 69)

Sport
- Sport: Fencing
Medal record
Men's fencing
Representing Italy
Olympic Games
Silver medal – second place	1960 Rome	Foil, team

Mario Curletto (13 September 1935 – 22 December 2004) was an Italian fencer. He won a silver medal in the team foil event at the 1960 Summer Olympics.
