= Mark Midler =

Soviet fencer (1931–2012)

Personal information
- Full name: Mark Petrovich Midler
- Born: 24 September 1931 Moscow, Soviet Union
- Died: 31 May 2012 (aged 80)

Sport
- Sport: Fencing
- Club: Burevestnik Moskva
Medal record
Men's fencing
Representing the Soviet Union
Gold medal – first place	1960 Rome	Team foil
Gold medal – first place	1964 Tokyo	Team foil

Mark Midler

Mark Petrovich Midler (Russian: Марк Петрович Мидлер; 24 September 1931 – 31 May 2012) was a Soviet Russian foil fencer. He competed at four Olympic Games, at which he won two gold medals.

== Early and personal life ==
Midler was born in Moscow, in the Soviet Union, and was Jewish.

== Fencing career ==
Midler was a member of the USSR National Fencing Team between 1951 and 1967. He trained at Burevestnik in Moscow.

Midler won the Soviet individual foil title six times (1954–57, 1963, and 1965) and the Soviet Cup in 1961.

=== World Championships ===
Midler won four consecutive World Championships in Foil, in 1959 to 1962. He also won a silver medal in 1957 and bronze medals in 1959 and 1961. Along with his Soviet teammates, he won the World Team Championships in Foil five times: in 1959, 1962, 1963, 1965, and 1966. They also won a silver medal in 1967.

=== Olympics ===
Midler was captain of the Foil team for the 1960 Olympic Games and the 1964 Olympic Games. They won the gold medal in Team Foil at both Olympics.

== Coaching career ==
Midler coached fencing for the Olympic teams of the Soviet Union and Russia. From 1971 until 2000, Midler was the coach of the Soviet and later Russian national foil team. He was also the head coach of the Soviet 1980 Olympic foil team, Unified Team 1992 Olympic foil team, and Russian 1996 and 2000 Olympic foil teams.

== Awards ==
Midler was inducted into the International Jewish Sports Hall of Fame in 1983. In 1960 he was awarded the Order of the Badge of Honor.

== See also ==
- List of select Jewish fencers
- List of Jewish Olympic medalists
