= Ahmed El-Hamy El-Husseini =

Egyptian fencer

Personal information
- Born: 19 March 1939 Cairo, Egypt
- Died: 27 March 1993 (aged 54)

Sport
- Sport: Fencing
Medal record
Mediterranean Games
Silver medal – second place	1959 Beirut	Team foil

Ahmed El-Hamy El-Husseini (Arabic: أحمد الحامي الحسيني; 19 March 1939 – 27 March 1993) was an Egyptian foil fencer. He competed at the 1960, 1964 and 1968 Summer Olympics. At the 1960 Games, he represented the United Arab Republic. He also competed at the 1959 Mediterranean Games where he won a silver medal in the team foil event.
