= Eugene Glazer (fencer) =

American fencer (born 1939)

Gene Glazer
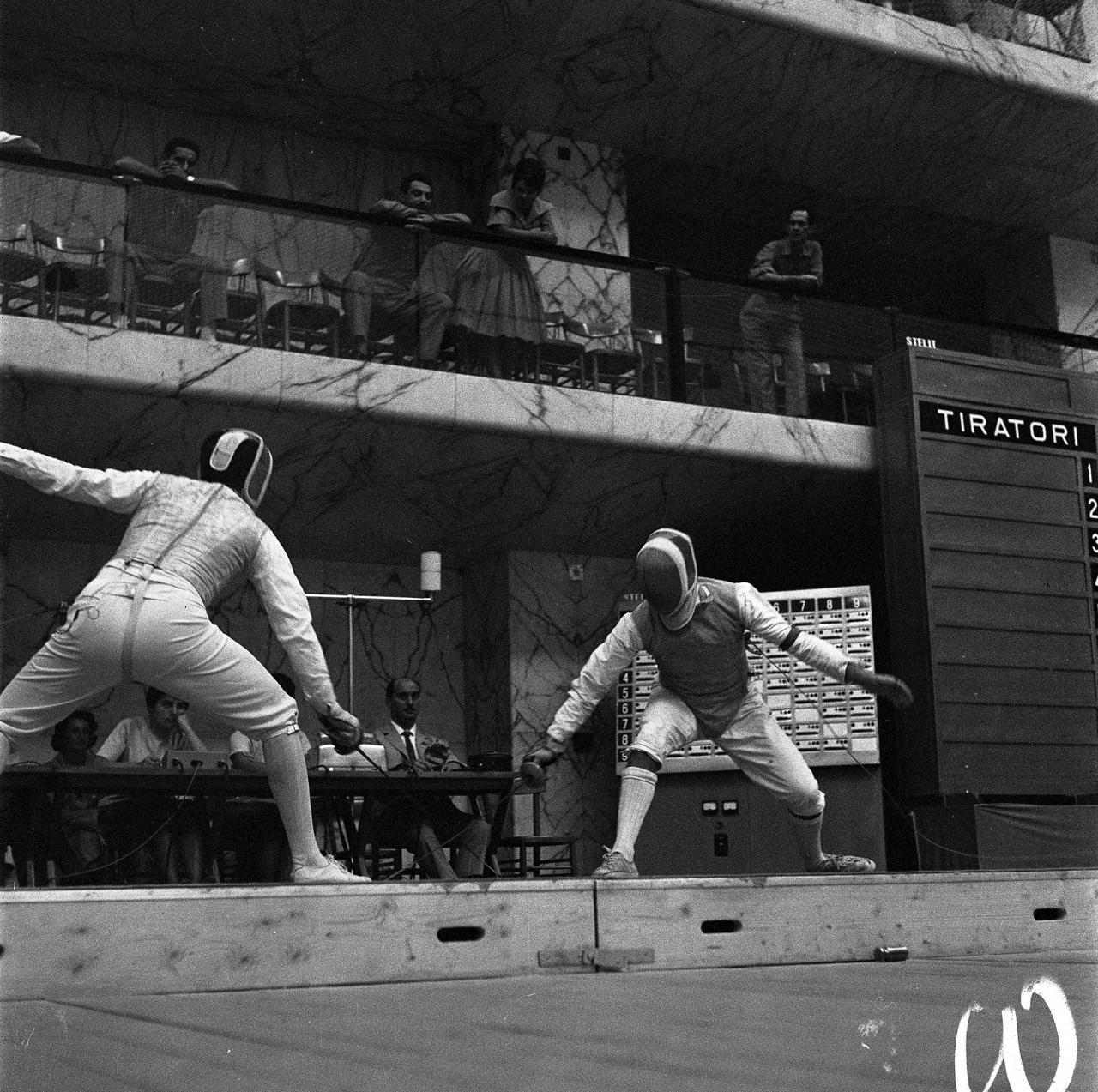
- Fencing at the 17th Summer Olympics. 1960

Personal information
- Full name: Eugene Gerson "Gene" Glazer
- Born: November 24, 1939 (age 86) New York, New York, U.S.

Sport
- Country: United States
- Sport: Fencing
- College team: New York University
- Club: Fencers Club

Eugene Gerson "Gene" Glazer (born November 24, 1939) is an American former foil fencer.

== Early and personal life ==
Glazer was born in New York City, lived in Flushing, Queens, New York, and is Jewish. He became a securities analyst after college.

== Fencing career ==
In 1958, Glazer was third in the Amateur Fencers League of America National Championships in foil.

Glazer fenced for New York University. In 1960, he won the NCAA National Championship in foil with a 24–2 record while he was a junior. He also fenced for the Fencers Club of New York.

Fencing for the United States, Glazer won a gold medal in team foil at the 1959 Pan American Games.

Glazer competed at the 1960 Summer Olympics (individual and team foil) in Rome at the age of 20, and the 1964 Summer Olympics (team foil) in Tokyo at the age of 24.

He was inducted into the NYU Athletics Hall of Fame in 1984.

== See also ==
- List of NCAA fencing champions
