= Jürgen Brecht =

German fencer (born 1940)

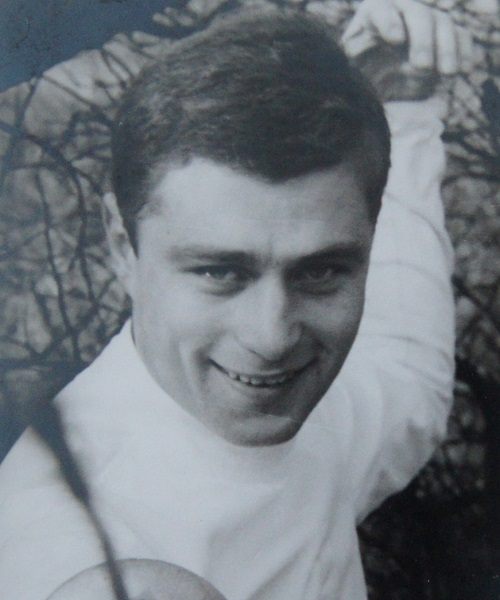
- Jürgen Brecht in 1967

Personal information
- Born: Julius Emil Jürgen Brecht; 1 March 1940 (age 86) Rheinland-Pfalz, Nazi Germany

Sport
- Sport: Fencing
Medal record
Men's fencing
Representing Germany
Olympic Games
Bronze medal – third place	1960 Rome	Foil, team

Jürgen Brecht (born 1 March 1940) is a German fencer. He represented the United Team of Germany in 1960 and 1964 and West Germany in 1968. He won a bronze medal in the team foil event at the 1960 Summer Olympics.
