= Albert Axelrod =

American fencer (1921–2004)

Personal information
- Born: February 12, 1921 The Bronx, United States
- Died: February 24, 2004 (aged 83) The Bronx, United States

Sport
- Sport: Fencing
- College team: City College of New York
- Club: Salle Santelli
Medal record
Men's fencing
Representing United States
Olympic Games
Bronze medal – third place	1960 Rome	Foil individual
Pan American Games
Silver medal – second place	1955 Mexico City	Individual Foil
Silver medal – second place	1955 Mexico City	Team Foil
Silver medal – second place	1959 Chicago	Individual Foil
Gold medal – first place	1959 Chicago	Team Foil
Silver medal – second place	1963 Sao Paulo	Individual Foil
Gold medal – first place	1963 Sao Paulo	Team Foil
Silver medal – second place	1967 Winnipeg	Individual Foil
Silver medal – second place	1967 Winnipeg	Team Foil
Maccabiah Games

Albert "Albie" Axelrod (February 12, 1921 – February 24, 2004) was an American foil fencer.

He was a five-time Olympian for the US, won a bronze medal at the 1960 Olympics, and was the only American men's foil fencer to reach the finals at the world championships until Gerek Meinhardt won a bronze medal in the 2010 World Fencing Championships.

== Fencing career ==
=== High school ===
Axelrod was Jewish, the son of Russian Jewish immigrants who had fled the pogroms, and grew up in the Bronx. A heart murmur kept him from participating in most sports, so his mother encouraged him to learn fencing at Stuyvesant High School in New York City. After graduation in 1938, he studied with 1920 Olympic champion Giorgio Santelli and won amateur titles as a member of the Salle Santelli club.

=== College ===
Axelrod served in the US Navy in World War II, and then attended the City College of New York. His college team reached the National Team Foil Championships in 1948, the same year he was U.S. Intercollegiate Fencing Association and NCAA Champion.

=== US Championships and rankings ===
He was ranked # 1 in the United States in 1955, 1958, 1960, and 1970, and was rated in the top ten 22 times in the years 1942 to 1970. Demonstrating exceptional dominance and skill in a sport where Americans had formerly lacked top competitors, he was a five-time winner of the National Foil Team Championship (1940, 1950, 1952, 1954, and 1958), and his team won the National Three-Weapon team crown five times (1949, 1952, 1954, 1962, and 1963).

=== World Championships ===
He was a member of the United States World Championship team four times. His best placing was fifth, in 1958.

=== Olympics ===
Most notably, Axelrod was on five U.S. Olympic Teams (1952–68). His greatest athletic achievement was winning the bronze medal in Individual Foil competition at the 1960 Summer Olympics in Rome. The entire USA Foil Fencing Team at the 1956 Olympics was Jewish, with the other Jewish fencers being Daniel Bukantz, Harold Goldsmith, Nathaniel Lubell, and Byron Krieger.

=== Pan American Games ===
He was also a member of four U.S. Pan American Games teams. He won three team gold medals, one team silver, and four individual silvers in Foil.

=== Maccabiah Games ===
Axelrod, who was Jewish, won many gold and silver medals in foil and sabre in his six appearances at the World Maccabiah Games in Israel, including the 1957 Maccabiah Games (where he won the gold medal in foil), the 1961 Maccabiah Games (in which he won a gold medal in individual foil, and a gold medal in team foil with Olympic teammate Byron Krieger), the 1965 Maccabiah Games in foil, and the 1969 Maccabiah Games.

== Personal ==
Professionally Axlerod worked for the Gruman Corporation as an electrical engineer, but would drive to Manhattan to practice fencing three nights a week. He died of a heart attack at Montefiore Medical Center in the Bronx on February 24, 2004. He left a wife, Henrietta, one son, and a daughter.

=== Approach to fencing ===
"I have no purely defensive moves", Axelrod told The New York Times in 1966. "Everyone attributes my skill to the fact that I'm a physical freak, that I have tremendously fast reflexes. I'm not a natural athlete. When it comes to fencing, I'm completely synthetic. I had to practice arduously and break down into tiny components every move I make."

== Editor ==
Axelrod was the Editor of "American Fencing" magazine (1986–90).

== Hall of Fame inductions ==
Axelrod was inducted into the International Jewish Sports Hall of Fame in 1973.

He was inducted into the USFA Hall of Fame in 1974.

== See also ==
- List of select Jewish fencers
- List of Jewish Olympic medalists
- List of NCAA fencing champions
- List of USFA Division I National Champions
- List of USFA Hall of Fame members
