= Brian McCowage =

Australian fencer (1935–1994)

Personal information
- Born: 20 May 1935 Sydney, Australia
- Died: 4 March 1994 (aged 58)

Sport
- Sport: Fencing
Medal record
Fencing
Representing Australia
British Empire Games
Silver medal – second place	1958 Cardiff	Men's Team Foil
Silver medal – second place	1962 Perth	Men's Team Foil
Silver medal – second place	1966 Kingston	Men's Team Foil
Silver medal – second place	1966 Kingston	Men's Team Sabre

Brian Patrick McCowage (20 May 1935 – 4 March 1994) was an Australian fencer. He competed at the 1956, 1960 and 1964 Summer Olympics.
