= Emilio Echeverry =

Colombian fencer (1929–2015)

Personal information
- Born: 8 March 1929 Chinchiná, Caldas, Colombia
- Died: 4 May 2015 (aged 86)

Sport
- Sport: Fencing

Emilio Echeverry (8 March 1929 – 4 May 2015) was a Colombian épée, foil and sabre fencer. He competed at the 1956, 1960 and 1964 Summer Olympics.

Echeverry was described by El Tiempo as his nation's "prominent fencer" preceding Mauricio Rivas and Juan Miguel Paz; he won seven medals at the Central American and Caribbean Games between 1946 and 1962 and was twice his country's Olympic flagbearer.
