= Fencing at the 1968 Summer Olympics – Men's foil =

Fencing at the Olympics

Men's foil at the Games of the XIX Olympiad
- Venue: Fernando Montes de Oca Fencing Hall
- Dates: 15 – 16 October 1968
- Competitors: 64 from 25 nations

Medalists
1st place, gold medalist(s)		Ion Drîmbă	Romania
2nd place, silver medalist(s)		Jenő Kamuti	Hungary
3rd place, bronze medalist(s)		Daniel Revenu	France

The men's foil was one of eight fencing events on the fencing at the 1968 Summer Olympics programme. It was the fifteenth appearance of the event. The competition was held from 15 to 16 October 1968. 64 fencers from 25 nations competed. Nations had been limited to three fencers each since 1928. The event was won by Ion Drîmbă of Romania, the nation's first medal in the men's foil. Silver went to Jenő Kamuti, the first medal for Hungary in the event since 1948. Daniel Revenu of France repeated as the bronze medalist, the sixth man to win multiple medals in the event.

== Background ==
This was the 15th appearance of the event, which has been held at every Summer Olympics except 1908 (when there was a foil display only rather than a medal event). Seven of the eight quarterfinalists (all but the champion) from 1964 returned: silver medalist Jean Claude Magnan and bronze medalist Daniel Revenu of France, fourth-place finisher Roland Losert of Austria, fifth-place finisher Jenő Kamuti of Hungary, sixth-place finisher Tim Gerresheim of the United Team of Germany (now competing for West Germany), and joint seventh-place finishers Sándor Szabó of Hungary and Henry Hoskyns of Great Britain. The Soviet team included the last two world champions: German Sveshnikov and Viktor Putyatin. Romania held the team world championship.

Lebanon, Paraguay, and Puerto Rico each made their debut in the men's foil; West Germany competed separately for the first time. The United States made its 14th appearance, most of any nation, having missed only the inaugural 1896 competition.

== Competition format ==
The 1968 tournament continued to use a mix of pool play and knockout rounds, but with substantial changes from 1964. The first two rounds were round-robin pool play, followed by a knockout round, finishing with another pool for the final. Early-round barrages were eliminated and the knockout round was a modified double elimination round.

- Round 1: 12 pools, with 5 or 6 fencers in each pool. The top 4 fencers in each pool advanced, cutting the field from 64 to 48.
- Round 2: 8 pools, with 6 fencers per pool. Again, the top 4 fencers advanced, reducing the number of remaining fencers from 48 to 32.
- Knockout round: This was a modified double-elimination tournament. The 32 fencers were divided into 4 groups of 8. The winner of the "winners bracket" in each group advanced to the final pool. The winner of the "losers bracket" from each group faced the winner of a different group's "losers bracket," with the winner of that match advancing to the final pool as well. The knockout round winnowed the fencers from 32 to 6.
- Final round: A final pool with the 6 remaining fencers determined the medals and 4th through 6th place. A barrage was used if necessary.

== Schedule ==
All times are Central Standard Time (UTC-6)

Date	Time	Round
Tuesday, 15 October 1968	8:30; 17:00	Round 1 Round 2 Knockout rounds
Wednesday, 16 October 1968		Final

== Results ==
=== Round 1 ===
==== Round 1 Pool A ====
Pos	Fencer	W	L	TF	TA	Qual.	GP	DW	VP	GJ	EP
1	Graham Paul (GBR)	4	0	20	12	Q		1–0	1–0	1–0	1–0
2	Dieter Wellmann (FRG)	3	1	18	10	Q	0–1		1–0	1–0	1–0
3	Viktor Putyatin (URS)	2	2	17	12	Q	0–1	0–1		1–0	1–0
4	Graeme Jennings (AUS)	1	3	8	17	Q	0–1	0–1	0–1		1–0
5	Evaristo Prendes (ARG)	0	4	8	20		0–1	0–1	0–1	0–1	

Source: Official Report, vol. 3, p. 637

==== Round 1 Pool B ====
Pos	Fencer	W	L	TF	TA	Qual.	LA	JK	FS	DB	MR
1	Larry Anastasi (USA)	3	1	17	10	Q		1–0	0–1	1–0	1–0
2	Jenő Kamuti (HUN)	3	1	19	13	Q	0–1		1–0	1–0	1–0
3	Fujio Shimizu (JPN)	3	1	18	13	Q	1–0	0–1		1–0	1–0
4	Dagoberto Borges (CUB)	1	3	13	19	Q	0–1	0–1	0–1		1–0
5	Michael Ryan (IRL)	0	4	8	20		0–1	0–1	0–1	0–1	

Source: Official Report, vol. 3, p. 637

==== Round 1 Pool C ====
Pos	Fencer	W	L	TF	TA	Qual.	WW	GS	GW	MS	AV	JMP
1	Witold Woyda (POL)	5	0	25	9	Q		1–0	1–0	1–0	1–0	1–0
2	German Sveshnikov (URS)	4	1	22	10	Q	0–1		1–0	1–0	1–0	1–0
3	Gerry Wiedel (CAN)	3	2	17	14	Q	0–1	0–1		1–0	1–0	1–0
4	Moustafa Soheim (EGY)	2	3	15	17	Q	0–1	0–1	0–1		1–0	1–0
5	Alberto Varela (URU)	1	4	9	21		0–1	0–1	0–1	0–1		1–0
6	José Miguel Pérez (PUR)	0	5	8	25		0–1	0–1	0–1	0–1	0–1	

Source: Official Report, vol. 3, p. 637

==== Round 1 Pool D ====
Pos	Fencer	W	L	TF	TA	Qual.	MT	JCM	AEE	OR	EB	ON
1	Mihai Țiu (ROU)	4	1	22	10	Q		0–1	1–0	1–0	1–0	1–0
2	Jean-Claude Magnan (FRA)	4	1	24	12	Q	1–0		1–0	0–1	1–0	1–0
3	Ahmed El-Hamy El-Husseini (EGY)	3	2	19	19	Q	0–1	0–1		1–0	1–0	1–0
4	Orlando Ruíz (CUB)	2	3	20	21	Q	0–1	1–0	0–1		1–0	0–1
5	Enrique Barúa (PER)	1	4	11	22		0–1	0–1	0–1	0–1		1–0
6	Orlando Nannini (ARG)	1	4	11	23		0–1	0–1	0–1	1–0	0–1	

Source: Official Report, vol. 3, p. 637

==== Round 1 Pool E ====
Pos	Fencer	W	L	TF	TA	Qual.	RP	RT	PLR	CC	FS
1	Ryszard Parulski (POL)	4	0	20	10	Q		1–0	1–0	1–0	1–0
2	Rudolf Trost (AUT)	2	2	12	12	Q	0–1		1–0	0–1	1–0
3	Pasquale La Ragione (ITA)	2	2	14	14	Q	0–1	0–1		1–0	1–0
4	Carlos Calderón (MEX)	1	3	14	15	Q	0–1	1–0	0–1		0–1
5	Freddy Salazar (VEN)	1	3	10	19		0–1	0–1	0–1	1–0	

Source: Official Report, vol. 3, p. 637

==== Round 1 Pool F ====
Pos	Fencer	W	L	TF	TA	Qual.	LK	NG	MC	HA	JBH	FP
1	László Kamuti (HUN)	5	0	25	13	Q		1–0	1–0	1–0	1–0	1–0
2	Nicola Granieri (ITA)	4	1	23	11	Q	0–1		1–0	1–0	1–0	1–0
3	Michel Constandt (BEL)	3	2	18	16	Q	0–1	0–1		1–0	1–0	1–0
4	Héctor Abaunza (MEX)	2	3	18	22	Q	0–1	0–1	0–1		1–0	1–0
5	John Bouchier-Hayes (IRL)	1	4	14	23		0–1	0–1	0–1	0–1		1–0
6	Félix Piñero (VEN)	0	5	12	25		0–1	0–1	0–1	0–1	0–1	

Source: Official Report, vol. 3, p. 637

==== Round 1 Pool G ====
Pos	Fencer	W	L	TF	TA	Qual.	GS	SS	FW	RG	FF
1	Guillermo Saucedo (ARG)	3	1	17	8	Q		1–0	0–1	1–0	1–0
2	Sándor Szabó (HUN)	3	1	16	13	Q	0–1		1–0	1–0	1–0
3	Friedrich Wessel (FRG)	3	1	17	14	Q	1–0	0–1		1–0	1–0
4	Román Gómez (MEX)	1	3	12	17	Q	0–1	0–1	0–1		1–0
5	Fionbarr Farrell (IRL)	0	4	12	20		0–1	0–1	0–1	0–1	

Source: Official Report, vol. 3, p. 637

==== Round 1 Pool H ====
Pos	Fencer	W	L	TF	TA	Qual.	RL	DR	RH	JC	SA	RdP
1	Roland Losert (AUT)	5	0	25	7	Q		1–0	1–0	1–0	1–0	1–0
2	Daniel Revenu (FRA)	4	1	23	9	Q	0–1		1–0	1–0	1–0	1–0
3	Russell Hobby (AUS)	3	2	17	16	Q	0–1	0–1		1–0	1–0	1–0
4	Jeffrey Checkes (USA)	2	3	12	20	Q	0–1	0–1	0–1		1–0	1–0
5	Souheil Ayoub (LIB)	1	4	10	21		0–1	0–1	0–1	0–1		1–0
6	Rodolfo da Ponte (PAR)	0	5	11	25		0–1	0–1	0–1	0–1	0–1	

Source: Official Report, vol. 3, p. 637

==== Round 1 Pool I ====
Pos	Fencer	W	L	TF	TA	Qual.	ID	MGE	BH	HC	BR
1	Ion Drîmbă (ROU)	4	0	20	9	Q		1–0	1–0	1–0	1–0
2	Mohamed Gamil El-Kalyoubi (EGY)	3	1	17	9	Q	0–1		1–0	1–0	1–0
3	Bill Hoskyns (GBR)	2	2	15	13	Q	0–1	0–1		1–0	1–0
4	Herbert Cohen (USA)	1	3	7	19	Q	0–1	0–1	0–1		1–0
5	Bill Ronald (AUS)	0	4	11	20		0–1	0–1	0–1	0–1	

Source: Official Report, vol. 3, p. 637

==== Round 1 Pool J ====
Pos	Fencer	W	L	TF	TA	Qual.	TM	AP	TG	FB	MC
1	Tănase Mureșanu (ROU)	4	0	20	13	Q		1–0	1–0	1–0	1–0
2	Arcangelo Pinelli (ITA)	2	2	15	14	Q	0–1		0–1	1–0	1–0
3	Tim Gerresheim (FRG)	2	2	17	15	Q	0–1	1–0		1–0	0–1
4	Florent Bessemans (BEL)	1	3	15	17	Q	0–1	0–1	0–1		1–0
5	Magdy Conyd (CAN)	1	3	11	19		0–1	0–1	1–0	0–1	

Source: Official Report, vol. 3, p. 638

==== Round 1 Pool K ====
Pos	Fencer	W	L	TF	TA	Qual.	AL	CN	KM	UB	PB
1	Adam Lisewski (POL)	3	1	18	13	Q		0–1	1–0	1–0	1–0
2	Christian Noël (FRA)	3	1	19	14	Q	1–0		1–0	0–1	1–0
3	Kazuo Mano (JPN)	2	2	18	14	Q	0–1	0–1		1–0	1–0
4	Udo Birnbaum (AUT)	2	2	15	16	Q	0–1	1–0	0–1		1–0
5	Peter Bakonyi (CAN)	0	4	7	20		0–1	0–1	0–1	0–1	

Source: Official Report, vol. 3, p. 638

==== Round 1 Pool L ====
Pos	Fencer	W	L	TF	TA	Qual.	VS	HO	JG	MB	SF
1	Vasyl Stankovych (URS)	4	0	20	10	Q		1–0	1–0	1–0	1–0
2	Heizaburo Okawa (JPN)	3	1	19	10	Q	0–1		1–0	1–0	1–0
3	Jesús Gil (CUB)	1	3	7	16	Q	0–1	0–1		0–1	1–0
4	Mike Breckin (GBR)	1	3	16	17	Q	0–1	0–1	1–0		0–1
5	Silvio Fernández (VEN)	1	3	9	18		0–1	0–1	0–1	1–0	

Source: Official Report, vol. 3, p. 638

=== Round 2 ===
==== Round 2 Pool A ====
Pos	Fencer	W	L	TF	TA	Qual.	DR	GP	TG	RH	DB	MGE
1	Daniel Revenu (FRA)	4	1	21	14	Q		1–0	1–0	1–0	1–0	0–1
2	Graham Paul (GBR)	3	2	23	15	Q	0–1		0–1	1–0	1–0	1–0
3	Tim Gerresheim (FRG)	3	2	20	17	Q	0–1	1–0		1–0	0–1	1–0
4	Russell Hobby (AUS)	2	3	15	19	Q	0–1	0–1	0–1		1–0	1–0
5	Dagoberto Borges (CUB)	2	3	18	21		0–1	0–1	1–0	0–1		1–0
6	Mohamed Gamil El-Kalyoubi (EGY)	1	4	10	21		1–0	0–1	0–1	0–1	0–1	

Source: Official Report, vol. 3, p. 638

==== Round 2 Pool B ====
Pos	Fencer	W	L	TF	TA	Qual.	AP	BH	FW	SS	LA	GJ
1	Arcangelo Pinelli (ITA)	4	1	24	15	Q		0–1	1–0	1–0	1–0	1–0
2	Bill Hoskyns (GBR)	4	1	23	15	Q	1–0		0–1	1–0	1–0	1–0
3	Friedrich Wessel (FRG)	3	2	21	20	Q	0–1	1–0		0–1	1–0	1–0
4	Sándor Szabó (HUN)	2	3	17	20	Q	0–1	0–1	1–0		0–1	1–0
5	Larry Anastasi (USA)	2	3	19	21		0–1	0–1	0–1	1–0		1–0
6	Graeme Jennings (AUS)	0	5	12	25		0–1	0–1	0–1	0–1	0–1	

Source: Official Report, vol. 3, p. 638

==== Round 2 Pool C ====
Pos	Fencer	W	L	TF	TA	Qual.	NG	CN	WW	KM	MC	OR
1	Nicola Granieri (ITA)	4	1	24	20	Q		1–0	1–0	1–0	1–0	0–1
2	Christian Noël (FRA)	3	2	22	15	Q	0–1		1–0	0–1	1–0	1–0
3	Witold Woyda (POL)	3	2	23	18	Q	0–1	0–1		1–0	1–0	1–0
4	Kazuo Mano (JPN)	3	2	21	18	Q	0–1	1–0	0–1		1–0	1–0
5	Michel Constandt (BEL)	1	4	14	21		0–1	0–1	0–1	0–1		1–0
6	Orlando Ruíz (CUB)	1	4	12	24		1–0	0–1	0–1	0–1	0–1	

Source: Official Report, vol. 3, p. 638

==== Round 2 Pool D ====
Pos	Fencer	W	L	TF	TA	Qual.	MT	HO	PLR	RT	JG	MS
1	Mihai Țiu (ROU)	4	1	23	8	Q		1–0	0–1	1–0	1–0	1–0
2	Heizaburo Okawa (JPN)	4	1	20	14	Q	0–1		1–0	1–0	1–0	1–0
3	Pasquale La Ragione (ITA)	3	2	23	18	Q	1–0	0–1		1–0	1–0	0–1
4	Rudolf Trost (AUT)	2	3	15	18	Q	0–1	0–1	0–1		1–0	1–0
5	Jesús Gil (CUB)	1	4	11	23		0–1	0–1	0–1	0–1		1–0
6	Moustafa Soheim (EGY)	1	4	13	24		0–1	0–1	1–0	0–1	0–1	

Source: Official Report, vol. 3, p. 638

==== Round 2 Pool E ====
Pos	Fencer	W	L	TF	TA	Qual.	RP	VS	JCM	MB	AEE	CC
1	Ryszard Parulski (POL)	5	0	25	12	Q		1–0	1–0	1–0	1–0	1–0
2	Vasyl Stankovych (URS)	4	1	23	16	Q	0–1		1–0	1–0	1–0	1–0
3	Jean-Claude Magnan (FRA)	3	2	22	15	Q	0–1	0–1		1–0	1–0	1–0
4	Mike Breckin (GBR)	2	3	15	18	Q	0–1	0–1	0–1		1–0	1–0
5	Ahmed El-Hamy El-Husseini (EGY)	1	4	16	20		0–1	0–1	0–1	0–1		1–0
6	Carlos Calderón (MEX)	0	5	5	25		0–1	0–1	0–1	0–1	0–1	

Source: Official Report, vol. 3, p. 638

==== Round 2 Pool F ====
Pos	Fencer	W	L	TF	TA	Qual.	GS	HA	AL	UB	LK	GW
1	German Sveshnikov (URS)	5	0	25	10	Q		1–0	1–0	1–0	1–0	1–0
2	Héctor Abaunza (MEX)	3	2	19	16	Q	0–1		0–1	1–0	1–0	1–0
3	Adam Lisewski (POL)	3	2	18	16	Q	0–1	1–0		1–0	1–0	0–1
4	Udo Birnbaum (AUT)	2	3	14	21	Q	0–1	0–1	0–1		1–0	1–0
5	László Kamuti (HUN)	1	4	19	21		0–1	0–1	0–1	0–1		1–0
6	Gerry Wiedel (CAN)	1	4	11	22		0–1	0–1	1–0	0–1	0–1	

Source: Official Report, vol. 3, p. 638

==== Round 2 Pool G ====
Pos	Fencer	W	L	TF	TA	Qual.	FS	GS	TM	JK	JC	FB
1	Fujio Shimizu (JPN)	5	0	25	13	Q		1–0	1–0	1–0	1–0	1–0
2	Guillermo Saucedo (ARG)	4	1	24	15	Q	0–1		1–0	1–0	1–0	1–0
3	Tănase Mureșanu (ROU)	2	3	16	17	Q	0–1	0–1		0–1	1–0	1–0
4	Jenő Kamuti (HUN)	2	3	17	20	Q	0–1	0–1	1–0		0–1	1–0
5	Jeffrey Checkes (USA)	1	4	13	21		0–1	0–1	0–1	1–0		0–1
6	Florent Bessemans (BEL)	1	4	14	23		0–1	0–1	0–1	0–1	1–0	

Source: Official Report, vol. 3, p. 638

==== Round 2 Pool H ====
Pos	Fencer	W	L	TF	TA	Qual.	ID	RL	VP	DW	HC	RG
1	Ion Drîmbă (ROU)	5	0	25	10	Q		1–0	1–0	1–0	1–0	1–0
2	Roland Losert (AUT)	3	2	18	14	Q	0–1		0–1	1–0	1–0	1–0
3	Viktor Putyatin (URS)	3	2	21	18	Q	0–1	1–0		0–1	1–0	1–0
4	Dieter Wellmann (FRG)	3	2	19	19	Q	0–1	0–1	1–0		1–0	1–0
5	Herbert Cohen (USA)	1	4	17	22		0–1	0–1	0–1	0–1		1–0
6	Román Gómez (MEX)	0	5	8	25		0–1	0–1	0–1	0–1	0–1	

Source: Official Report, vol. 3, p. 638

=== Double elimination rounds ===
==== Winners brackets ====
===== Winners group 1 =====
Round of 32
Ion Drîmbă (ROU)	W
Udo Birnbaum (AUT)	L
Arcangelo Pinelli (ITA)	W
Bill Hoskyns (GBR)	L
Witold Woyda (POL)	W
Kazuo Mano (JPN)	L
Tim Gerresheim (FRG)	L
Daniel Revenu (FRA)	W

Round of 16
Ion Drîmbă (ROU)	W
Arcangelo Pinelli (ITA)	L
Witold Woyda (POL)	L
Daniel Revenu (FRA)	W

Round of 8
Ion Drîmbă (ROU)	L
Daniel Revenu (FRA)	W

===== Winners group 2 =====
Round of 32
Vasyl Stankovych (URS)	W
Héctor Abaunza (MEX)	L
Friedrich Wessel (FRG)	W
Graham Paul (GBR)	L
Jean-Claude Magnan (FRA)	W
Tănase Mureșanu (ROU)	L
Russell Hobby (AUS)	W
Fujio Shimizu (JPN)	L

Round of 16
Vasyl Stankovych (URS)	W
Friedrich Wessel (FRG)	L
Jean-Claude Magnan (FRA)	W
Russell Hobby (AUS)	L

Round of 8
Vasyl Stankovych (URS)	L
Jean-Claude Magnan (FRA)	W

===== Winners group 3 =====
Round of 32
German Sveshnikov (URS)	W
Rudolf Trost (AUT)	L
Adam Lisewski (POL)	W
Heizaburo Okawa (JPN)	L
Guillermo Saucedo (ARG)	L
Pasquale La Ragione (ITA)	W
Sándor Szabó (HUN)	L
Mihai Țiu (ROU)	W

Round of 16
German Sveshnikov (URS)	W
Adam Lisewski (POL)	L
Pasquale La Ragione (ITA)	L
Mihai Țiu (ROU)	W

Round of 8
German Sveshnikov (URS)	L
Mihai Țiu (ROU)	W

===== Winners group 4 =====
Round of 32
Roland Losert (AUT)	W
Jenő Kamuti (HUN)	L
Viktor Putyatin (URS)	W
Nicola Granieri (ITA)	L
Christian Noël (FRA)	W
Dieter Wellmann (FRG)	L
Mike Breckin (GBR)	L
Ryszard Parulski (POL)	W

Round of 16
Roland Losert (AUT)	L
Viktor Putyatin (URS)	W
Christian Noël (FRA)	W
Ryszard Parulski (POL)	L

Round of 8
Viktor Putyatin (URS)	L
Christian Noël (FRA)	W

==== Losers brackets ====
===== Losers group 1 =====
Round of 8
Udo Birnbaum (AUT)	L
Bill Hoskyns (GBR)	W
Kazuo Mano (JPN)	L
Tim Gerresheim (FRG)	W
Héctor Abaunza (MEX)	L
Graham Paul (GBR)	W
Tănase Mureșanu (ROU)	W
Fujio Shimizu (JPN)	L

Round of 8
Bill Hoskyns (GBR)	L
Arcangelo Pinelli (ITA)	W
Tim Gerresheim (FRG)	L
Witold Woyda (POL)	W
Graham Paul (GBR)	W
Friedrich Wessel (FRG)	L
Tănase Mureșanu (ROU)	W
Russell Hobby (AUS)	L

Round of 4
Arcangelo Pinelli (ITA)	L
Witold Woyda (POL)	W
Graham Paul (GBR)	L
Tănase Mureșanu (ROU)	W

Round of 4
Witold Woyda (POL)	L
Ion Drîmbă (ROU)	W
Tănase Mureșanu (ROU)	W
Vasyl Stankovych (URS)	L

Round of 2
Ion Drîmbă (ROU)	L
Tănase Mureșanu (ROU)	W

===== Losers group 2 =====
Round of 8
Rudolf Trost (AUT)	L
Heizaburo Okawa (JPN)	W
Guillermo Saucedo (ARG)	L
Sándor Szabó (HUN)	W
Jenő Kamuti (HUN)	W
Nicola Granieri (ITA)	L
Dieter Wellmann (FRG)	W
Mike Breckin (GBR)	L

Round of 8
Heizaburo Okawa (JPN)	W
Adam Lisewski (POL)	L
Sándor Szabó (HUN)	W
Pasquale La Ragione (ITA)	L
Jenő Kamuti (HUN)	W
Roland Losert (AUT)	L
Dieter Wellmann (FRG)	L
Ryszard Parulski (POL)	W

Round of 4
Heizaburo Okawa (JPN)	W
Sándor Szabó (HUN)	L
Jenő Kamuti (HUN)	W
Ryszard Parulski (POL)	L

Round of 4
Heizaburo Okawa (JPN)	L
German Sveshnikov (URS)	W
Jenő Kamuti (HUN)	W
Viktor Putyatin (URS)	L

Round of 2
German Sveshnikov (URS)	L
Jenő Kamuti (HUN)	W

=== Final round ===
Pos	Fencer	W	L	TF	TA	Qual.	ID	JK	DR	CN	JCM	MT
1st place, gold medalist(s)	Ion Drîmbă (ROU)	4	1	22	15			1–0	1–0	0–1	1–0	1–0
2	Jenő Kamuti (HUN)	3	2	19	14	B	0–1		0–1	1–0	1–0	1–0
2	Daniel Revenu (FRA)	3	2	22	17	B	0–1	1–0		1–0	1–0	0–1
4	Christian Noël (FRA)	2	3	14	18		1–0	0–1	0–1		0–1	1–0
5	Jean-Claude Magnan (FRA)	2	3	18	22		0–1	0–1	0–1	1–0		1–0
6	Mihai Țiu (ROU)	1	4	14	23		0–1	0–1	1–0	0–1	0–1	

Source: Official Report, vol. 3, p. 639

Barrage

Pos	Fencer	W	L	TF	TA	JK	DR
2nd place, silver medalist(s)	Jenő Kamuti (HUN)	1	0	5	4		5–4
3rd place, bronze medalist(s)	Daniel Revenu (FRA)	0	1	4	5	4–5	

Source: Official Report, vol. 3, p. 639
