= Fencing at the 1968 Summer Olympics – Men's team foil =

Men's team foil at the Games of the XIX Olympiad
- Venue: Fernando Montes de Oca Fencing Hall
- Dates: 18–19 October
- Competitors: 79 from 17 nations

Medalists
1st place, gold medalist(s)		Jean-Claude Magnan; Daniel Revenu; Christian Noël; Gilles Berolatti; Jacques Dimont	France
2nd place, silver medalist(s)		Yury Sisikin; Viktor Putyatin; German Sveshnikov; Yury Sharov; Vasyl Stankovych	Soviet Union
3rd place, bronze medalist(s)		Zbigniew Skrudlik; Witold Woyda; Egon Franke; Ryszard Parulski; Adam Lisewski	Poland

The men's team foil was one of eight fencing events on the fencing at the 1968 Summer Olympics programme. It was the twelfth appearance of the event. The competition was held from 18 to 19 October 1968. 79 fencers from 17 nations competed.

== Rosters ==
Argentina

- Orlando Nannini
- Guillermo Saucedo
- Omar Vergara
- Evaristo Prendes

Canada

- Magdy Conyd
- Peter Bakonyi
- Gerry Wiedel
- John Andru

Cuba

- Eduardo Jhons
- Orlando Ruíz
- Jesús Gil
- Dagoberto Borges

Egypt

- Ahmed El-Hamy El-Husseini
- Mohamed Gamil El-Kalyoubi
- Moustafa Soheim
- Ahmed Zein El-Abidin

France

- Jean-Claude Magnan
- Daniel Revenu
- Christian Noël
- Gilles Berolatti
- Jacques Dimont

Great Britain

- Allan Jay
- Graham Paul
- Nick Halsted
- Mike Breckin
- Bill Hoskyns

Hungary

- Sándor Szabó
- Jenő Kamuti
- László Kamuti
- Gábor Füredi
- Attila May

Ireland

- Fionbarr Farrell
- John Bouchier-Hayes
- Michael Ryan
- Colm O'Brien

Italy

- Pasquale La Ragione
- Alfredo Del Francia
- Nicola Granieri
- Arcangelo Pinelli
- Michele Maffei

Japan

- Masaya Fukuda
- Heizaburo Okawa
- Fujio Shimizu
- Kazuhiko Wakasugi
- Kazuo Mano

Mexico

- Vicente Calderón
- Román Gómez
- Carlos Calderón
- Gustavo Chapela
- Héctor Abaunza

Poland

- Zbigniew Skrudlik
- Witold Woyda
- Egon Franke
- Ryszard Parulski
- Adam Lisewski

Romania

- Ion Drîmbă
- Mihai Țiu
- Ștefan Haukler
- Tănase Mureșanu
- Iuliu Falb

Soviet Union

- Yury Sisikin
- Viktor Putyatin
- German Sveshnikov
- Yury Sharov
- Vasyl Stankovych

United States

- Herbert Cohen
- Albie Axelrod
- Uriah Jones
- Larry Anastasi
- Jeffrey Checkes

Venezuela

- Silvio Fernández
- Félix Piñero
- Freddy Salazar
- Luis García

West Germany

- Jürgen Theuerkauff
- Friedrich Wessel
- Tim Gerresheim
- Jürgen Brecht
- Dieter Wellmann

== Results ==
=== Round 1 ===
==== Pool A ====
Pos	Team	W	L	BW	BL	Qual.	FRA	CUB	MEX
1	France	2	0	21	7	Q		9–3	12–4
2	Cuba	1	1	12	16	Q	3–9		9–7
3	Mexico	0	2	11	21		4–12	7–9	

Source: Official Report, vol. 3, pp. 645–47

==== Pool B ====
Pos	Team	W	L	BW	BL	Qual.	URS	GBR	USA
1	Soviet Union	2	0	21	4	Q		9–0	12–4
2	Great Britain	1	1	9	16	Q	0–9		9–7
3	United States	0	2	11	21		4–12	7–9	

Source: Official Report, vol. 3, pp. 645–47

==== Pool C ====
Pos	Team	W	L	BW	BL	Qual.	ROU	JPN	EGY
1	Romania	2	0	21	11	Q		8.61–8.57	13–3
2	Japan	1	1	21	11	Q	8.57–8.61		13–3
3	Egypt	0	2	6	26		3–13	3–13	

Source: Official Report, vol. 3, pp. 645–47

==== Pool D ====
Pos	Team	W	L	BW	BL	Qual.	POL	HUN	ARG	VEN
1	Poland	3	0	30	15	Q		9–4	11–5	10–6
2	Hungary	2	1	33	12	Q	4–9		14–2	15–1
3	Argentina	0	2	7	25		5–11	2–14		
4	Venezuela	0	2	7	25		6–10	1–15		

Source: Official Report, vol. 3, pp. 645–47

==== Pool E ====
Pos	Team	W	L	BW	BL	Qual.	FRG	ITA	CAN	IRL
1	West Germany	3	0	37	5	Q		9–1	13–3	15–1
2	Italy	2	1	31	11	Q	1–9		15–1	15–1
3	Canada	0	2	4	28		3–13	1–15		
4	Ireland	0	2	2	30		1–15	1–15		

Source: Official Report, vol. 3, pp. 645–47

=== Elimination rounds ===
Main bracket

Round of 16
B2	Great Britain	8 (66)
C2	Japan	8 (64)
A2	Cuba	2
D2	Hungary	9

Quarterfinals
C2	Japan	8 (64)
A1	France	8 (60)
D1	Poland	9
E1	West Germany	4
D2	Hungary	4
B1	Soviet Union	9
C1	Romania	8
E2	Italy	7

Semifinals
A1	France	9
D1	Poland	7
B1	Soviet Union	8 (60)
C1	Romania	8 (63)

Final
A1	France	9
B1	Soviet Union	6
Bronze
D1	Poland	9
C1	Romania	3

Consolation

Consol. semifinals
C2	Japan	8 (60)
E1	West Germany	8 (57)
D2	Hungary	9
E2	Italy	4

5th/6th
E1	West Germany	4
D2	Hungary	9

== Final ranking ==
Rank	Nation
1st place, gold medalist(s)	France
2nd place, silver medalist(s)	Soviet Union
3rd place, bronze medalist(s)	Poland
4	Romania
5	Hungary
6	West Germany
7	Italy
7	Japan
9	Cuba
9	Great Britain
11	Argentina
11	Canada
11	Egypt
11	Mexico
11	United States
16	Ireland
16	Venezuela
