= Soviet Union at the 1968 Summer Olympics =

- Flag of the Soviet Union
- IOC code: URS
- NOC: Soviet Olympic Committee

in Mexico City, Mexico 12 October 1968 – 27 October 1968
- Competitors: 312 (246 men, 66 women) in 18 sports
- Flag bearer: Leonid Zhabotinsky
- Medals Ranked 2nd: Gold 29 Silver 32 Bronze 30 Total 91

Summer Olympics appearances (overview)
- 1952; 1956; 1960; 1964; 1968; 1972; 1976; 1980; 1984; 1988

Other related appearances
- Russian Empire (1900–1912); Estonia (1920–1936, 1992–pres.); Latvia (1924–1936, 1992–pres.); Lithuania (1924–1928, 1992–pres.); Unified Team (1992); Armenia (1994–pres.); Belarus (1994–2020); Georgia (1994–pres.); Kazakhstan (1994–pres.); Kyrgyzstan (1994–pres.); Moldova (1994–pres.); Russia (1994–2016); Ukraine (1994–pres.); Uzbekistan (1994–pres.); Azerbaijan (1996–pres.); Tajikistan (1996–pres.); Turkmenistan (1996–pres.); ROC (2020); Individual Neutral Athletes (2024)

The Soviet Union (USSR) competed at the 1968 Summer Olympics in Mexico City. 312 competitors, 246 men and 66 women, took part in 164 events in 18 sports.

== Medalists ==
The USSR finished second in the final medal rankings, with 29 gold and 91 total medals.

=== Gold ===
- Natalia Kuchinskaya — Artistic Gymnastics, Women's Balance Beam
- Larisa Petrik — Artistic Gymnastics, Women's Floor Exercise
- Mikhail Voronin — Artistic Gymnastics, Men's Horizontal Bar
- Natalia Kuchinskaya, Zinaida Voronina, Larisa Petrik, Olga Karaseva, Ludmilla Tourischeva, Lyubov Burda — Artistic Gymnastics, Women's Team Competition
- Mikhail Voronin — Artistic Gymnastics, Men's Vault
- Vladimir Golubnichy — Athletics, Men's 20 km Walk
- Yanis Lusis — Athletics, Men's Javelin Throw
- Viktor Saneev — Athletics, Men's triple jump
- Valeri Sokolov — Boxing, Men's Bantamweight
- Boris Lagutin — Boxing, Men's Light-middleweight
- Daniel Poznyak — Boxing, Men's Light-heavyweight
- Lyudmila Khvedosyuk-Pinaeva — Canoeing, Women's K-1 500m
- Aleksandr Sharapenko, Vladimir Morozov — Canoeing, Men's K-2 1000m
- Ivan Kizimov, his horse Ijor — Equestrian, Individual Mixed
- Elena Novikova-Belova — Fencing, Women's Foil Individual
- Aleksandra Zabelina, Tatyana Petrenko-Samusenko, Elena Novikova-Belova, Galina Gorokhova, Svetlana Tširkova — Fencing, Women's Foil Team
- Vladimir Nazlymov, Viktor Sidyak, Eduard Vinokurov, Mark Rakita, Umar Mavlikhanov — Fencing, Men's Sabre Team
- Anatoli Sass, Aleksandr Timoshinin — Rowing, Men's Double Sculls
- Valentyn Mankin — Sailing, Men's Finn
- Grigory Kosykh — Shooting, Men's 50m Pistol
- Evgeni Petrov — Shooting, Men's Skeet
- Eduard Sibiryakov, Valeri Kravchenko, Vladimir Belyaev, Yevgeni Lapinsky, Oleg Antropov, Vasilius Matushevas, Viktor Mikhalchuk, Yuri Poyarkov, Boris Tereshchuk, Vladimir Ivanov, Ivan Bugaenkov, Georgi Mondzolevsky — Volleyball, Men's Team
- Lyudmila Buldakova, Lyudmila Mikhailovskaya, Tatyana Veinberga, Vera Lantratova, Vera Galushka-Duyunova, Tatyana Sarycheva, Tatyana Ponyaeva-Tretyakova, Nina Smoleeva, Inna Ryskal, Galina Leontyeva, Roza Salikhova, Valentina Kamenek-Vinogradova — Volleyball, Women's Team
- Leonid Zhabotinsky — Weightlifting, Men's Heavyweight
- Viktor Kurentsov — Weightlifting, Men's Middleweight
- Boris Selitsky — Weightlifting, Men's Light-heavyweight
- Aleksandr Medved — Wrestling, Men's Freestyle Heavyweight
- Boris Gurevich — Wrestling, Men's Freestyle Middleweight
- Roman Rurua — Wrestling, Men's Greco-Roman Featherweight

=== Silver ===
- Mikhail Voronin — Artistic Gymnastics, Men's Individual All-round
- Zinaida Voronina — Artistic Gymnastics, Women's Individual All-round
- Mikhail Voronin — Artistic Gymnastics, Men's Parallel Bars
- Mikhail Voronin — Artistic Gymnastics, Men's Rings
- Mikhail Voronin, Sergey Diomidov, Valery Ilyinykh, Valery Karasyov, Viktor Klimenko, Viktor Lisitsky — Artistic Gymnastics, Men's Team Competition
- Romuald Klim — Athletics, Men's Hammer Throw
- Antonina Okorokova-Lazareva — Athletics, Women's High Jump
- Jonas Chepulis — Boxing, Men's Heavyweight
- Aleksei Kiselyov — Boxing, Men's 71–75 kg
- Aleksandr Sharapenko — Canoeing, Men's K-1 1000m
- Natalya Lobanova — Diving, Women's 10m Platform
- Tamara Pogozheva — Diving, Women's 3m Platform
- Yelena Petushkova, Pepel, Ivan Kizimov, Ijor, Ivan Kalita, Absent — Equestrian, Team Mixed
- Grigory Kriss — Fencing, Men's Épée Individual
- Grigory Kriss, Iosif Vitebskiy, Aleksey Nikanchikov, Yury Smolyakov, Viktor Modzolevsky — Fencing, Men's Épée Team
- German Sveshnikov, Yuri Sharov, Vasyl Stankovych, Viktor Putyatin, Yury Sisikin — Fencing, Men's Foil Team
- Mark Rakita — Fencing, Men's Sabre Individual
- Stasis Shaparnis, Boris Onishenko, Pavel Lednev — Modern Pentathlon, Men's Team Competition
- Valentin Kornev — Shooting, Men's 300m Free Rifle 3 Positions
- Vladimir Kosinsky — Swimming, Men's 100m Breaststroke
- Vladimir Kosinsky — Swimming, Men's 200m Breaststroke
- Georgi Kulikov, Viktor Mazanov, Semyon Belits-Geiman, Leonid Ilyichov — Swimming, Men's 4 × 100m Freestyle Relay
- Galina Prozumenshchikova — Swimming, Women's 100m Breaststroke
- Aleksey Barkalov, Aleksandr Dolgushin, Aleksandr Shidlovsky, Boris Grishin, Givi Chikvanaya, Leonid Osipov, Oleg Bovin, Vadim Gulyaev, Vladimir Semyonov, Vyacheslav Skok, Yury Grigorovsky — Men's Water polo
- Dito Shanidze — Men's Weightlifting, Featherweight
- Vladimir Belyaev — Men's Weightlifting, Light Heavyweight
- Jaan Talts — Men's Weightlifting, Middle Heavyweight
- Shota Lomidze — Men's Wrestling, Freestyle -97 kg
- Vladimir Bakulin — Men's Wrestling, Greco-Roman -52 kg
- Valentin Oleynik — Men's Wrestling, Greco-Roman -87 kg
- Nikolai Yakovenko — Men's Wrestling, Greco-Roman -97 kg
- Anatoly Roshchin — Men's Wrestling, Greco-Roman +97 kg

=== Bronze ===
- Larisa Petrik — Artistic Gymnastics, Women's Balance Beam
- Natalia Kuchinskaya — Artistic Gymnastics, Women's Floor Exercise
- Natalia Kuchinskaya — Artistic Gymnastics, Women's Individual All-round
- Viktor Klimenko — Artistic Gymnastics, Men's Parallel Bars
- Mikhail Voronin — Artistic Gymnastics, Men's Pommel Horse
- Zinaida Voronina — Artistic Gymnastics, Women's Uneven Bars
- Sergei Diomidov — Artistic Gymnastics, Men's Vault
- Zinaida Voronina — Artistic Gymnastics, Women's Vault
- Nikolai Smaga — Athletics, Men's 20 km Walk
- Natalya Pechenkina — Athletics, Women's 400m
- Lyudmila Zharkova, Galina Bukharina, Vera Popkova, Lyudmila Samotyosova — Athletics, Women's 4 × 100 m Relay
- Valentin Gavrilov — Athletics, Men's High Jump
- Valentina Kozyr — Athletics, Women's High Jump
- Tatyana Talysheva — Athletics, Women's Long Jump
- Eduard Gushchin — Athletics, Men's Shot Put
- Nadezhda Chizhova — Athletics, Women's Shot Put
- Anatoli Krikun, Modestas Paulauskas, Zurab Sakandelidze, Vadim Kapranov, Yuri Selikhov, Anatoli Polivoda, Sergei Belov, Priit Tomson, Sergei Kovalenko, Gennadi Volnov, Jaak Lipso, Vladimir Andreyev — Basketball, Men's Team
- Vladimir Musalimov — Boxing, Men's Welterweight
- Vitaly Galkov — Canoeing, Men's C-1 1000m
- Naum Prokupets, Mikhail Zamotin — Canoeing, Men's C-2 1000m
- Lyudmila Pinayeva, Antonina Seredina — Canoeing, Women's K-2 500m
- Pavel Lednyov — Modern Pentathlon, Men's Individual Competition
- Zigmas Jukna, Antanas Bagdonavičius, Volodymyr Sterlik, Juozas Jagelavičius, Aleksandr Martyshkin, Vytautas Briedis, Valentyn Kravchuk, Viktor Suslin, Yuriy Lorentsson — Rowing, Men's Eight with Coxswain
- Renart Suleimanov — Shooting, Men's 25m Rapid Fire Pistol
- Vitaly Parkhimovich — Shooting, Men's 50m Rifle 3 Positions
- Nikolai Pankin — Swimming, Men's 100m Breaststroke
- Galina Prozumenschikova-Stepanova — Swimming, Women's 200m Breaststroke
- Yuri Gromak, Vladimir Kosinsky, Vladimir Nemshilov, Leonid Ilyichev — Swimming, Men's 4 × 100 m Medley Relay
- Vladimir Bure, Semyon Belits-Geiman, Georgi Kulikov, Leonid Ilyichev — Swimming, Men's 4 × 200 m Freestyle Relay
- Ivan Kochergin — Wrestling, Men's Greco-Roman Bantamweight

== Cycling ==
Fifteen cyclists represented the Soviet Union in 1968.

Individual road race

- Valery Yardy
- Yury Dmitriyev
- Vladislav Nelyubin
- Anatoliy Starkov

Team time trial

- Boris Shukhov
- Aleksandr Dokhlyakov
- Yury Dmitriyev
- Valery Yardy

Sprint

- Omar Pkhak'adze
- Serhiy Kravtsov

1000m time trial

- Serhiy Kravtsov

Tandem

- Igor Tselovalnikov
- Imants Bodnieks

Team pursuit

- Dzintars Lācis
- Stanislav Moskvin
- Vladimir Kuznetsov
- Mikhail Kolyushev
- Viktor Bykov

== Diving ==
Men

Athlete	Event	Preliminary		Final			
Athlete	Event	Points	Rank	Points	Rank	Total	Rank
Boris Poluliakhi	3 m springboard	84.32	20	Did not advance			
Mikhail Safonov	3 m springboard	92.77	12 Q	48.25	9	141.02	9
Vladimir Vasin	3 m springboard	95.73	10 Q	43.86	11	139.59	11
Viktor Pogozhev	10 m platform	86.89	16	Did not advance			
Mikhail Safonov	10 m platform	91.43	10 Q	47.34	8	138.77	9
Vladimir Vasin	10 m platform	91.91	9 Q	46.49	9	138.40	10

Women

Athlete	Event	Preliminary		Final			
Athlete	Event	Points	Rank	Points	Rank	Total	Rank
Yelena Anokhina	3 m springboard	90.35	7 Q	38.82	10	129.17	8
Vera Baklanova	3 m springboard	88.89	8 Q	43.42	6	132.31	6
Tamara Pogozheva	3 m springboard	97.50	2 Q	47.80	3	145.30	2nd place, silver medalist(s)
Galina Alekseyeva	10 m platform	47.31	14	Did not advance			
Nadezhda Karpukhina	10 m platform	43.52	22	Did not advance			
Nataliya Kuznetsova-Lobanova	10 m platform	53.80	1 Q	51.34	3	105.14	2nd place, silver medalist(s)

== Fencing ==
20 fencers, 15 men and 5 women, represented the Soviet Union in 1968.

Men's foil

- German Sveshnikov
- Vasyl Stankovych
- Viktor Putyatin

Men's team foil

- Yury Sisikin, Viktor Putyatin, German Sveshnikov, Yury Sharov, Vasyl Stankovych

Men's épée

- Grigory Kriss
- Viktor Modzalevsky
- Aleksey Nikanchikov

Men's team épée

- Grigory Kriss, Viktor Modzalevsky, Iosif Vitebsky, Aleksey Nikanchikov, Yury Smolyakov

Men's sabre

- Mark Rakita
- Vladimir Nazlymov
- Umyar Mavlikhanov

Men's team sabre

- Umyar Mavlikhanov, Mark Rakita, Viktor Sidyak, Vladimir Nazlymov, Eduard Vinokurov

Women's foil

- Yelena Novikova-Belova
- Galina Gorokhova
- Aleksandra Zabelina

Women's team foil

- Yelena Novikova-Belova, Galina Gorokhova, Aleksandra Zabelina, Tatyana Petrenko-Samusenko, Svetlana Tširkova

== Modern pentathlon ==
Three male pentathletes represented the Soviet Union in 1968. They won a team silver and Pavel Lednyov won an individual bronze.

Individual

- Pavel Lednyov
- Borys Onyshchenko
- Stasys Šaparnis

Team

- Pavel Lednyov
- Borys Onyshchenko
- Stasys Šaparnis

== Rowing ==
The Soviet Union had 27 male rowers participate in all seven rowing events in 1968.

Men's single sculls

- Viktor Melnikov (Виктор Мельников)

Men's double sculls – 1st place ( gold medal)

- Anatoliy Sass (Анатолий Сасс)
- Aleksandr Timoshinin (Александр Тимошинин)

Men's coxless pair

- Apolinaras Grigas (Аполинарас Григас)
- Vladimir Rikkanen (Владимир Рикканен)

Men's coxed pair

- Leonid Drachevsky (Леонид Драчевский)
- Tiit Helmja (Тийт Хельмя)
- Igor Rudakov (Игорь Рудаков)

Men's coxless four – 11th place

- Vitolds Barkāns (Витольдс Барканс)
- Elmārs Rubīns (Эльмар Рубинс)
- Pavel Ilyinsky (Павел Ильинский)
- Guntis Niedra (Гунтис Ниедра)

Men's coxed four – 6th place

- Anatoly Nemtyryov (Анатолий Немтырёв)
- Nikolay Surov (Николай Суров)
- Aleksey Mishin (Алексей Мишин)
- Arkady Kudinov (Аркадий Кудинов) – competed in the semi-final only
- Boris Duyunov (Борис Дуюнов) – did not compete in the semi-final
- Viktor Mikheyev (Виктор Михеев) – cox

Men's eight – 3rd place ( bronze medal)

- Zigmas Jukna (Зигмас Юкна)
- Antanas Bagdonavičius (Антанас Багдонавичюс)
- Volodymyr Sterlik (Володимир Стерлик)
- Juozas Jagelavičius (Йозас Ягелавичюс)
- Aleksandr Martyshkin (Александр Мартышкин)
- Vytautas Briedis (Витаутас Бриедис)
- Valentyn Kravchuk (Валентин Кравчук)
- Viktor Suslin (Виктор Суслин)
- Yuriy Lorentsson (Юрий Лоренцсон) – cox

== Shooting ==
Twelve shooters, all men, represented the Soviet Union in 1968. Between them they won two gold and two bronze medals.

25 m pistol

- Renart Suleymanov
- Anatoly Onishchuk

50 m pistol

- Grigory Kosykh
- Vladimir Stolypin

300 m rifle, three positions

- Valentin Kornev
- Shota Kveliashvili

50 m rifle, three positions

- Vitaly Parkhimovich
- Vladimir Konyakhin

50 m rifle, prone

- Valentin Kornev
- Vitaly Parkhimovich

Trap

- Pāvels Seničevs
- Aleksandr Alipov

Skeet

- Yevgeny Petrov
- Yury Tsuranov

== Volleyball ==
Men's Team Competition

- Round Robin

- Lost to United States (2–3)
- Defeated Brazil (3–2)
- Defeated Bulgaria (3–0)
- Defeated Poland (3–0)
- Defeated East Germany (3–2)
- Defeated Japan (3–1)
- Defeated Mexico (3–1)
- Defeated Belgium (3–0)
- Defeated Czechoslovakia (3–0) → Gold Medal

- Team Roster

- Eduard Sibiryakov
- Valeri Kravchenko
- Vladimir Belyayev
- Yevgeni Lapinsky
- Oleg Antropov
- Vasilius Matushevas
- Viktor Mikhalchuk
- Yuri Poyarkov
- Boris Tereshchuk
- Vladimir Ivanov
- Ivan Bugaenkov
- Georgi Mondzolevsky

Women's Team Competition

- Round Robin

- Defeated Czechoslovakia (3–1)
- Defeated Poland (3–0)
- Defeated South Korea (3–0)
- Defeated Peru (3–0)
- Defeated United States (3–1)
- Defeated Mexico (3–0)
- Defeated Japan (3–0) → Gold Medal

- Team Roster

- Lyudmila Buldakova
- Lyudmila Mikhailkovskaya
- Tatyana Veinberga
- Vera Lantratova
- Vera Galushka-Duyunova
- Tatyana Sarycheva
- Tatyana Ponyaeva-Tretyakova
- Nina Smoleeva
- Inna Ryskal
- Galina Leontyeva
- Roza Salikhova
- Valentina Kamenek-Vinogradova

== Water polo ==
Men's Team Competition

- Preliminary Round (Group A)

- Defeated Cuba (11:4)
- Defeated West Germany (6:3)
- Defeated Spain (5:0)
- Lost to Hungary (5:6)
- Defeated United States (8:3)
- Defeated Brazil (8:2)

- Semifinals

- Defeated Italy (8:5)

- Final

- Lost to Yugoslavia (11:13) → Silver Medal

- Team Roster

- Aleksey Barkalov
- Aleksandr Dolgushin
- Aleksandr Shidlovsky
- Boris Grishin
- Givi Chikvanaya
- Leonid Osipov
- Oleg Bovin
- Vadim Gulyaev
- Vladimir Semyonov
- Vyacheslav Skok
- Yury Grigorovsky

== Medals by republic ==
In the following table for team events number of team representatives, who received medals are counted, not "one medal for all the team", as usual. Because there were people from different republics in one team.

Rank	Nation	Gold	Silver	Bronze	Total
1	Russian SFSR	38	41	35	114
2	Ukrainian SSR	10	10	7	27
3	Belarusian SSR	4	1	0	5
4	Latvian SSR	3	1	1	5
5	Georgian SSR	2	3	1	6
6	Lithuanian SSR	2	2	5	9
7	Kazakh SSR	2	2	0	4
8	Azerbaijan SSR	2	0	0	2
9	Kirghiz SSR	1	0	0	1
9	Tajik SSR	1	0	0	1
9	Turkmen SSR	1	0	0	1
12	Estonian SSR	0	1	3	4
13	Uzbek SSR	0	1	1	2
14	Moldavian SSR	0	0	1	1
Totals (14 entries)		66	62	54	182
