= Volleyball at the 1968 Summer Olympics – Men's tournament =

Men's volleyball at the Games of the XIX Olympiad
- Venue: Gimnasio Olímpico Juan de la Barrera, Palacio de los Deportes Juan Escutia and Revolution Ice Rink
- Date: 13–26 October
- Competitors: 119 from 10 nations

Medalists
1st place, gold medalist(s)		Soviet Union (2nd title)
2nd place, silver medalist(s)		Japan
3rd place, bronze medalist(s)		Czechoslovakia

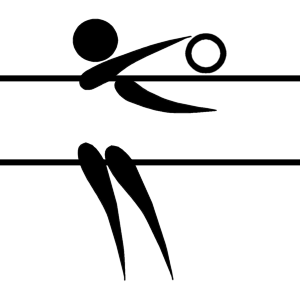

The men's tournament in volleyball at the 1968 Summer Olympics was the 2nd edition of the event at the Summer Olympics, organized by the world's governing body, the FIVB in conjunction with the IOC. It was held in Mexico City, Mexico from 13 to 26 October 1968.

== Qualification ==
Means of qualification		Date	Host	Vacancies	Qualified
Host country		18 October 1963	(West Germany) Baden-Baden	1	Mexico
1964 Olympic Games		13–23 October 1964	(Japan) Tokyo	1	Soviet Union
1966 World Championship		30 August – 11 September 1966	Czechoslovakia	3	Czechoslovakia
1966 World Championship		30 August – 11 September 1966	Czechoslovakia	3	~~Romania~~; Belgium*
1966 World Championship		30 August – 11 September 1966	Czechoslovakia	3	East Germany
1967 African Championship		July 1967	(Tunisia) Tunis	1	~~Tunisia~~; Bulgaria*
Asian Qualifier		1967	Unknown	1	Japan
1967 European Championship		26 October – 8 November 1967	Turkey	1	Poland
1967 Pan American Games	for NORCECA	24 July – 3 August 1967	(Canada) Winnipeg	1	United States
1967 Pan American Games	for CSV	24 July – 3 August 1967	(Canada) Winnipeg	1	Brazil
Total				10	

* Romania and Tunisia withdrew and were replaced by Belgium and Bulgaria respectively.

== Venues ==
Main venue	Sub venue	Sub venue
Mexico City, Mexico	Mexico City, Mexico	Mexico City, Mexico
Palacio de los Deportes Juan Escutia	Gimnasio Olímpico Juan de la Barrera	Revolution Ice Rink
Capacity: 22,370	Capacity: 5,292	Capacity: 1,500
		No Image

== Round robin ==
Pos	Team	Pld	W	L	Pts	SW	SL	SR	SPW	SPL	SPR
1	Soviet Union	9	8	1	17	26	8	3.250	464	326	1.423
2	Japan	9	7	2	16	24	6	4.000	430	258	1.667
3	Czechoslovakia	9	7	2	16	22	15	1.467	454	417	1.089
4	East Germany	9	6	3	15	22	12	1.833	449	374	1.201
5	Poland	9	6	3	15	18	11	1.636	371	281	1.320
6	Bulgaria	9	4	5	13	16	17	0.941	379	385	0.984
7	United States	9	4	5	13	15	18	0.833	383	414	0.925
8	Belgium	9	2	7	11	6	24	0.250	239	417	0.573
9	Brazil	9	1	8	10	8	25	0.320	357	469	0.761
10	Mexico	9	0	9	9	6	27	0.222	289	474	0.610

Date		Score		Set 1	Set 2	Set 3	Set 4	Set 5	Total
13 Oct	Japan	3–0	Poland	15–9	15–11	15–10			45–30
13 Oct	Belgium	3–1	Brazil	15–7	16–14	9–15	15–6		55–42
13 Oct	Bulgaria	3–0	Mexico	15–9	15–4	15–6			45–19
13 Oct	United States	3–2	Soviet Union	11–15	15–10	10–15	15–10	15–6	66–56
13 Oct	Czechoslovakia	3–2	East Germany	15–12	15–17	14–16	15–11	15–9	74–65
16 Oct	Bulgaria	3–0	Belgium	15–10	15–1	15–5			45–16
16 Oct	Czechoslovakia	3–1	United States	15–0	10–15	15–7	15–7		55–29
16 Oct	Poland	3–1	Mexico	15–10	7–15	15–4	15–3		52–32
16 Oct	Soviet Union	3–1	Brazil	11–15	15–2	15–9	15–9		56–35
16 Oct	Japan	3–0	East Germany	15–6	15–8	15–13			45–27
17 Oct	East Germany	3–0	Mexico	15–3	15–5	15–6			45–14
17 Oct	Soviet Union	3–0	Bulgaria	15–10	15–9	15–10			45–29
17 Oct	Poland	3–0	Belgium	15–6	15–5	15–8			45–19
17 Oct	United States	3–0	Brazil	15–12	15–7	15–10			45–29
17 Oct	Czechoslovakia	3–2	Japan	2–15	3–15	15–12	15–12	15–11	50–65
19 Oct	Japan	3–0	Mexico	15–1	15–3	15–11			45–15
19 Oct	Bulgaria	3–2	United States	10–15	17–15	7–15	15–7	16–14	65–66
19 Oct	Soviet Union	3–0	Poland	15–9	15–10	15–10			45–29
19 Oct	Czechoslovakia	3–2	Brazil	15–12	15–10	13–15	13–15	15–9	71–61
19 Oct	East Germany	3–0	Belgium	15–1	15–7	15–7			45–15
20 Oct	Japan	3–0	Belgium	15–5	15–5	15–4			45–14
20 Oct	Bulgaria	3–0	Brazil	15–8	18–16	15–3			48–27
20 Oct	Czechoslovakia	3–0	Mexico	15–10	15–8	15–8			45–26
20 Oct	Poland	3–0	United States	15–5	15–5	15–8			45–18
20 Oct	Soviet Union	3–2	East Germany	10–15	15–9	15–11	12–15	15–5	67–55
21 Oct	Czechoslovakia	3–2	Bulgaria	15–7	10–15	15–9	4–15	15–7	59–53
21 Oct	Belgium	3–2	Mexico	15–11	5–15	13–15	18–16	15–2	66–59
21 Oct	East Germany	3–0	United States	15–8	15–12	15–10			45–30
21 Oct	Poland	3–0	Brazil	15–12	15–4	15–7			45–23
21 Oct	Soviet Union	3–1	Japan	4–15	15–13	15–9	15–13		49–50
23 Oct	Poland	3–0	Bulgaria	15–3	15–5	15–10			45–18
23 Oct	Soviet Union	3–1	Mexico	15–5	15–8	11–15	15–5		56–33
23 Oct	Japan	3–0	United States	15–5	15–8	15–11			45–24
23 Oct	East Germany	3–1	Brazil	15–13	15–7	14–16	15–12		59–48
23 Oct	Czechoslovakia	3–0	Belgium	15–0	15–4	15–12			45–16
24 Oct	Japan	3–0	Brazil	15–8	15–11	15–12			45–31
24 Oct	East Germany	3–2	Bulgaria	15–11	8–15	15–10	10–15	15–7	63–58
24 Oct	United States	3–1	Mexico	14–16	15–10	15–9	15–11		59–46
24 Oct	Poland	3–1	Czechoslovakia	15–5	15–3	12–15	15–13		57–36
24 Oct	Soviet Union	3–0	Belgium	15–2	15–3	15–5			45–10
25 Oct	Japan	3–0	Bulgaria	15–7	15–6	15–5			45–18
25 Oct	United States	3–0	Belgium	15–4	16–14	15–10			46–28
25 Oct	Brazil	3–1	Mexico	14–16	15–6	17–15	15–8		61–45
25 Oct	East Germany	3–0	Poland	15–11	15–6	15–6			45–23
26 Oct	Soviet Union	3–0	Czechoslovakia	15–7	15–4	15–8			45–19

== Final standing ==
Rank	Team
1st place, gold medalist(s)	Soviet Union
2nd place, silver medalist(s)	Japan
3rd place, bronze medalist(s)	Czechoslovakia
4	East Germany
5	Poland
6	Bulgaria
7	United States
8	Belgium
9	Brazil
10	Mexico

1968 Men's Olympic champions

Soviet Union
2nd title

12–man Roster
Eduard Sibiryakov, Yuriy Poyarkov, Georgy Mondzolevski, Valeri Kravchenko, Volodymyr Byelyayev, Yevhen Lapinsky, Ivans Bugajenkovs, Oļegs Antropovs, Vasilijus Matuševas, Viktor Mikhalchuk, Borys Tereshchuk, Volodymyr Ivanov
Head coach
Yuri Chesnokov

== Medalists ==
Gold	Silver	Bronze
Soviet Union Eduard Sibiryakov; Yuriy Poyarkov; Georgy Mondzolevski; Valeri Kravchenko; Volodymyr Byelyayev; Yevhen Lapinsky; Ivans Bugajenkovs; Oļegs Antropovs; Vasilijus Matuševas; Viktor Mikhalchuk; Borys Tereshchuk; Volodymyr Ivanov Head coach: Yuri Chesnokov	Japan Masayuki Minami; Katsutoshi Nekoda; Mamoru Shiragami; Isao Koizumi; Kenji Kimura; Yasuaki Mitsumori; Naohiro Ikeda; Jungo Morita; Tadayoshi Yokota; Seiji Oko; Tetsuo Satō; Kenji Shimaoka Head coach: Yasutaka Matsudaira	Czechoslovakia Bohumil Golián; Antonín Procházka; Petr Kop; Jiří Svoboda; Josef Musil; Lubomír Zajíček; Josef Smolka; Vladimír Petlák; František Sokol; Zdeněk Groessl; Pavel Schenk; Drahomír Koudelka Head coach: Vladimir Matiásek
