= Venezuela at the 1968 Summer Olympics =

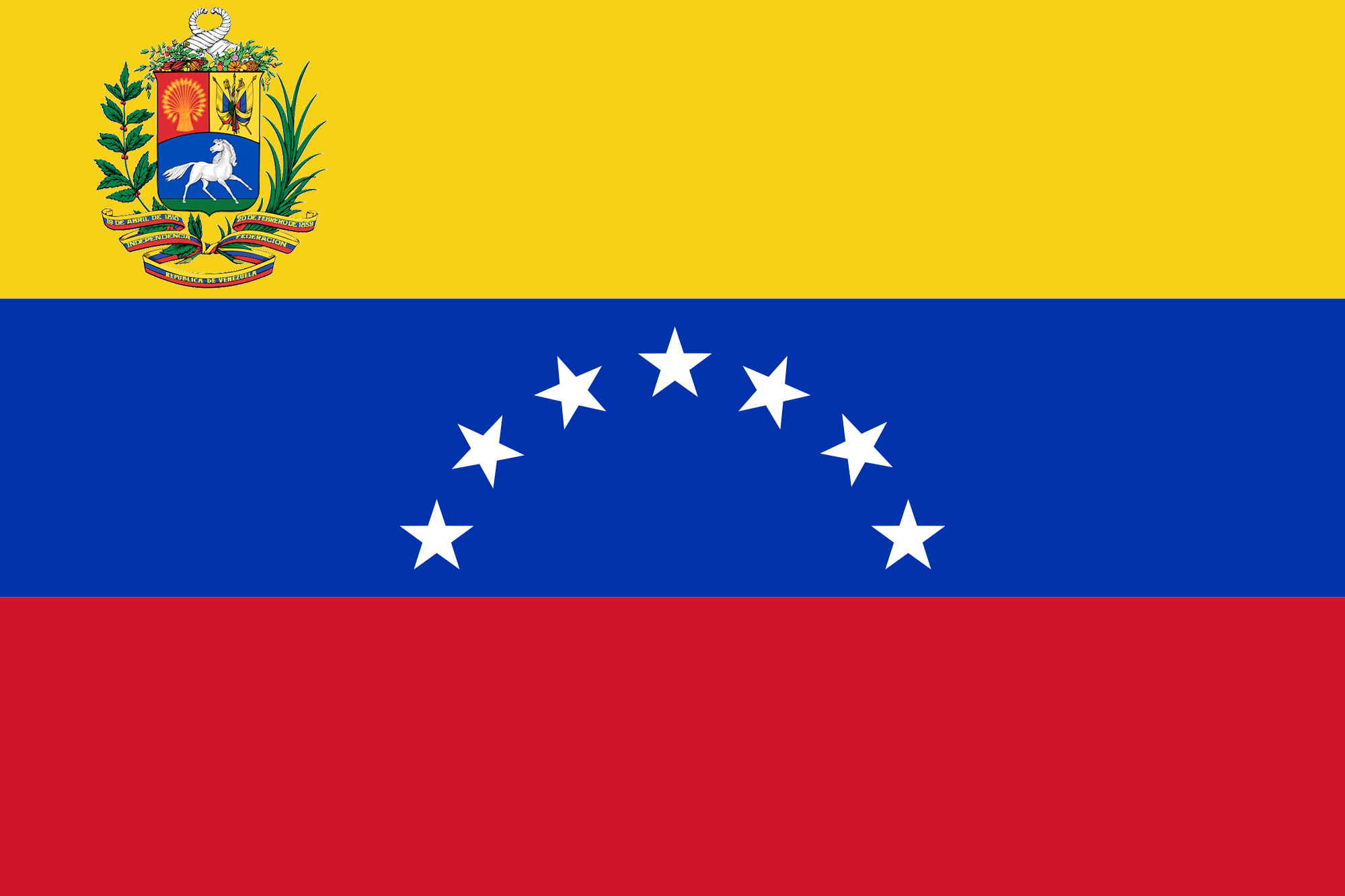
- IOC code: VEN
- NOC: Venezuelan Olympic Committee

in Mexico City
- Competitors: 23 in 5 sports
- Medals: Gold 1 Silver 0 Bronze 0 Total 1

Summer Olympics appearances (overview)
- 1948; 1952; 1956; 1960; 1964; 1968; 1972; 1976; 1980; 1984; 1988; 1992; 1996; 2000; 2004; 2008; 2012; 2016; 2020; 2024

Venezuela competed at the 1968 Summer Olympics in Mexico City, Mexico. Francisco Rodríguez won the nation's first ever gold medal. 23 competitors, all men, took part in 17 events in 5 sports.

== Medalists ==
=== Gold ===
- Francisco Rodríguez — Boxing, Men's light flyweight

== Boxing ==
Men's Light Flyweight (– 48 kg)

- Francisco Rodríguez

- First Round — Bye
- Second Round — Defeated Rafael Carbonell (CUB), 5:0
- Quarterfinals — Defeated Khata Karunatarne (CEY), TKO-2
- Semifinals — Defeated Harlan Marbley (USA), 4:1
- Final — Defeated Jee Yong-Ju (KOR), 3:2

== Fencing ==
Four fencers represented Venezuela in 1968.

Men's foil

- Freddy Salazar
- Silvio Fernández
- Félix Piñero

Men's team foil

- Silvio Fernández, Félix Piñero, Freddy Salazar, Luis García

Men's épée

- Silvio Fernández
- Félix Piñero

== Shooting ==
Five shooters represented Venezuela in 1968.

50 m pistol

- Edgar Espinoza

50 m rifle, three positions

- Juan Llabot

50 m rifle, prone

- Enrico Forcella
- Boris Loginow

Trap

- Ivo Orlandi
