= Ștefan Ardeleanu =

Romanian fencer and coach

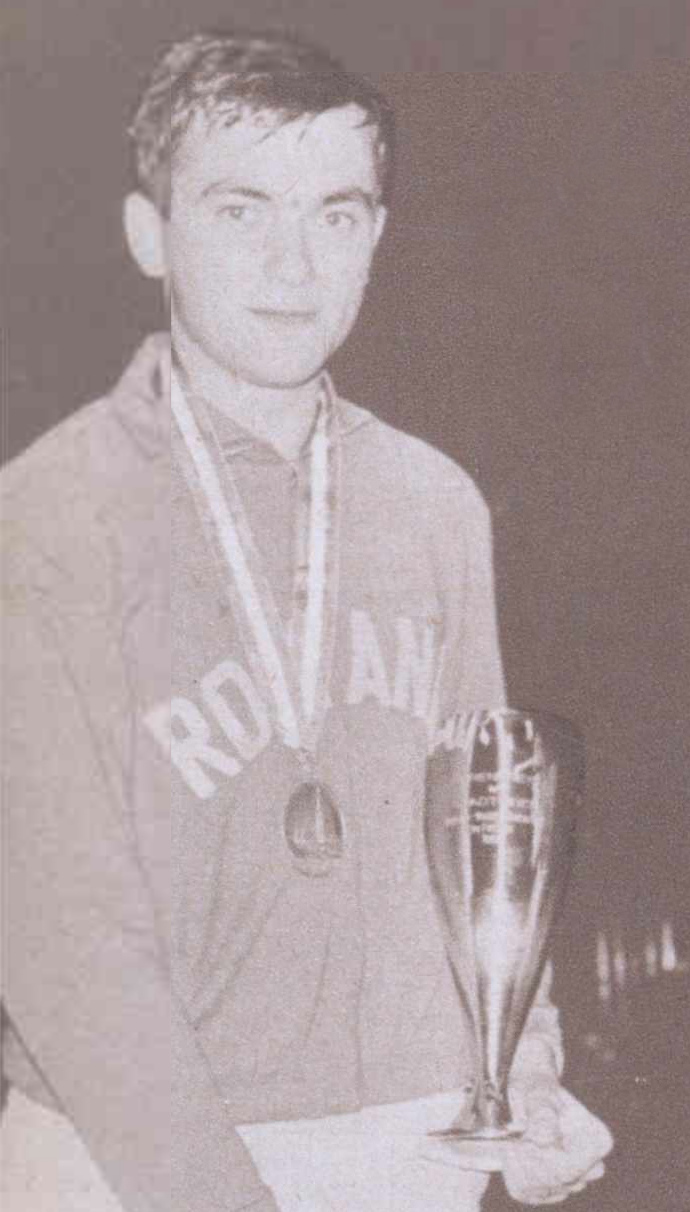

Personal information
- Born: 1940 (age 85–86) Satu Mare, Romania

Fencing career
- Sport: Fencing
- Weapon: foil, sabre
- Hand: right-handed
Medal record
Men's foil
Representing Romania
World Championships
Gold medal – first place	1967 Montreal	Team foil
Bronze medal – third place	1969 Havana	Team foil
Bronze medal – third place	1970 Ankara	Team foil

Ștefan Ardeleanu (born 1940) is a Romanian fencer and coach.

== Career ==
Ardeleanu took up fencing with coach Alexandru Csipler at local clubs Unio, then Olimpia Satu Mare, before transferring to CSA Steaua București under coach Vasile Chelaru. He won the 1965 junior national championship in sabre, then switched to foil. With Ion Drîmbă, Iuliu Falb, Tănase Mureșanu and Mihai Țiu, he earned Romania's first team world title in fencing at the 1967 World Fencing Championships in Montreal.

After his retirement as a fencer, he began a fencing coach career at CS Triumful in Bucharest. He assisted Ștefan Haukler as coach of the national woman's foil team from 1978 to 1980, before becoming principal coach. In 1992 he settled in Kuwait, then came back in 1998 to CS Satu Mare.

Ardeleanu is married to foil fencer Suzana Ardeleanu.

== Bibliography ==
- (in Romanian) Ștefan Stahl, Scrima sătmăreană. Miracol al sportului românesc, EuroPrint, Satu Mare, 2014
