= Borotín =

Borotín may refer to places in the Czech Republic:

- Borotín (Blansko District), a municipality and village in the South Moravian Region
- Borotín (Tábor District), a market town in the South Bohemian Region
