= Tereshchuk =

Tereshchuk (Ukrainian: Терещук) is a Ukrainian surname. Notable people with the surname include:

- Borys Tereshchuk (1945–2011) Ukrainian volleyball player
- Tetyana Tereshchuk-Antipova (born 1969) Ukrainian hurdler
- Orest Tereshchuk (born 1981) Ukrainian tennis player
- Victoria Tereshchuk (born 1982) Ukrainian pentathlete
