= Iuliu Falb =

Romanian fencer (1942–2009)

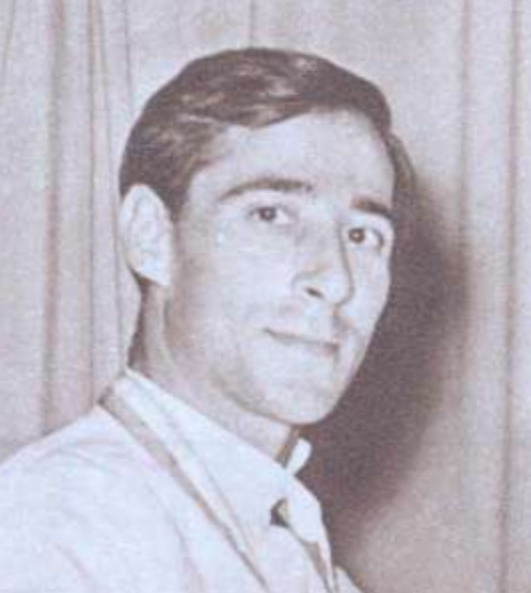

Personal information
- Born: 14 December 1942 Timișoara, Romania
- Died: 2009 (aged 66–67)
- Height: 1.77 m (5 ft 9 1/2 in)

Fencing career
- Sport: Fencing
- Weapon: foil
- Hand: right-handed
- Club: CSA Steaua
Medal record
Men's foil
Representing Romania
World Championships
Gold medal – first place	1967 Montreal	Team foil
Bronze medal – third place	1969 Havana	Team foil
Bronze medal – third place	1970 Ankara	Team foil

Iuliu Falb (14 December 1942 – 2009) was a Romanian fencer. He competed in the team foil events at the 1964, 1968 and 1972 Summer Olympics.

== Career ==
Falb took up fencing under the coaching of Andrei Altman at the local club "Flacăra Roșie", where he became friends with future teammate and Olympic champion Ion Drîmbă. He transferred in 1961 to CSA Steaua with coaches Constantin Panescu and Vasile Chelaru. He was national champion in 1965, 1966 and 1967. That same year, along with Ion Drîmbă, Ștefan Ardeleanu, Tănase Mureșanu and Mihai Țiu, he earned Romania's first team world title in fencing with a gold medal in Montreal. He was named "master in sports" (Maestru al sportului) in 1966, then "honoured master in sports" (Maestru emerit al sportului) a year later.

After his retirement as an athlete, Falb became a fencing coach, working for several clubs and for the National Institute of Physical Education in Bucharest. He also served as a national and international referee.
