= Pavel Schenk =

Czech volleyball player (1941–2025)

Personal information
- Born: 27 June 1941; Borotín, Protectorate of Bohemia and Moravia
- Died: 30 December 2025 (aged 84)
Medal record
Men's volleyball
Representing Czechoslovakia
Olympic Games
Silver medal – second place	1964 Tokyo	Team
Bronze medal – third place	1968 Mexico City	Team

Pavel Schenk (27 June 1941 – 30 December 2025) was a Czech volleyball player who competed for Czechoslovakia in the 1964 Summer Olympics, in the 1968 Summer Olympics, and in the 1972 Summer Olympics.

== Biography ==
Schenk was born in Borotín on 27 June 1941.

In 1964 he was part of the Czechoslovak team which won the silver medal in the Olympic tournament. He played all nine matches.

Four years later he won the bronze medal with the Czechoslovak team in the 1968 Olympic tournament. He played six matches.

At the 1972 Games he was a member of the Czechoslovak team which finished sixth in the Olympic tournament. He played five matches.

Schenk died on 30 December 2025, at the age of 84.
