= Ștefan cel Mare, Neamț =

Ștefan cel Mare
- Commune
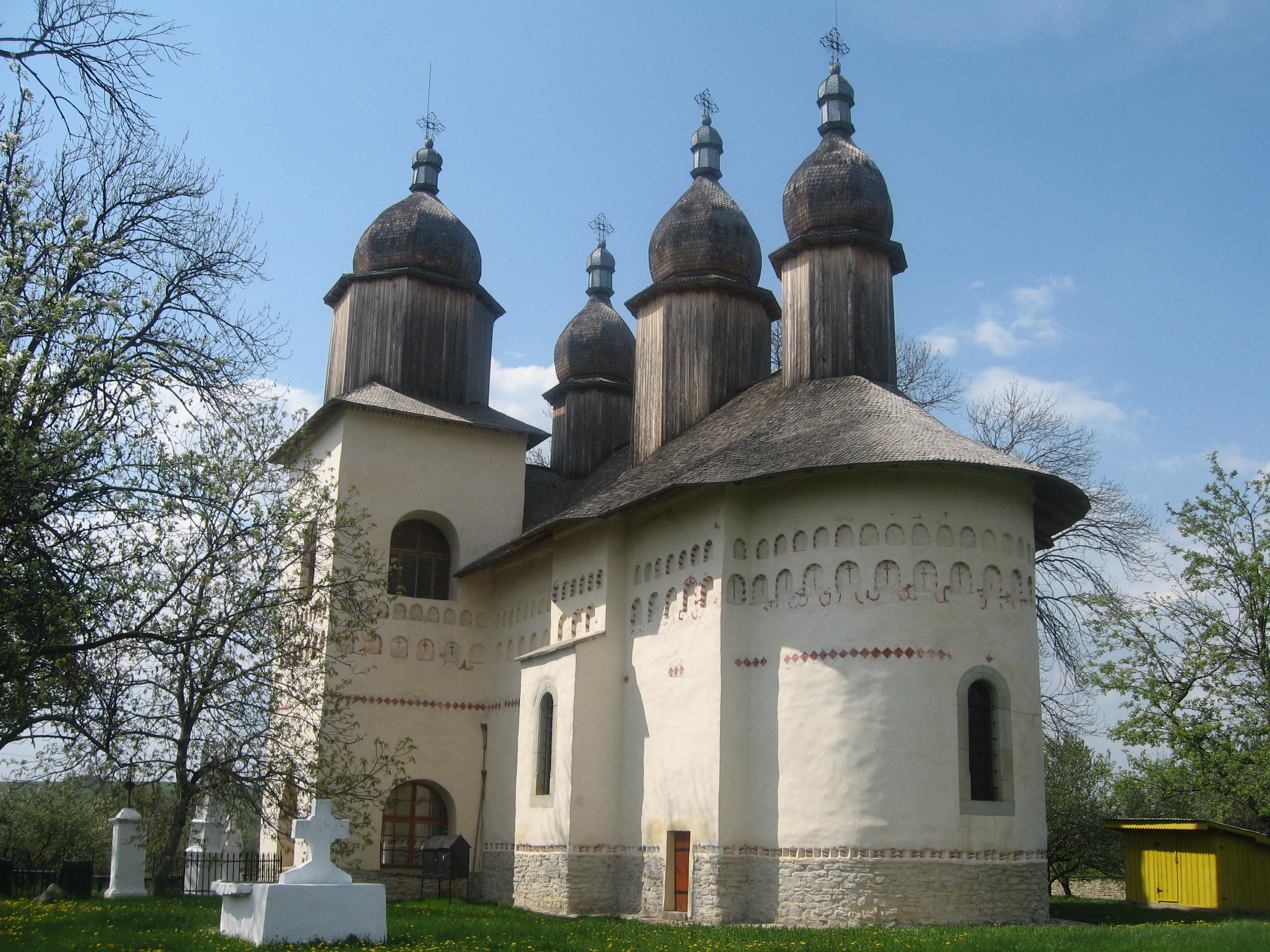
- Saint George Church in Ștefan cel Mare

- Location in Neamț County

- Location in Romania
- Coordinates: 46.985°N 26.511°E
- Country: Romania
- County: Neamț

Government
  - Mayor (2020–2024): Sorin Ouatu (PNL)
- Area: 48.96 km^{2} (18.90 sq mi)
- Elevation: 380 m (1,250 ft)
- Population (2021-12-01): 2,502
  - Density: 51.10/km^{2} (132.4/sq mi)
- Time zone: UTC+02:00 (EET)
  - Summer (DST): UTC+03:00 (EEST)
- Postal code: 617435
- Area code: +(40) 233
- Vehicle reg.: NT
- Website: www.primariastefancelmare.ro

Ștefan cel Mare (formerly Șerbești) is a commune in Neamț County, Western Moldavia, Romania. It is composed of seven villages: Bordea, Cârligi, Deleni, Dușești, Ghigoiești, Soci, and Ștefan cel Mare.

Historical population
Year	Pop.	±%
1992	3,640	—
2002	3,429	−5.8%
2011	3,024	−11.8%
2021	2,502	−17.3%
Source: Census data

== Natives ==
- Vasile Chelaru (1921 – 1999), fencer
