= Tănase Mureșanu =

Romanian fencer (1940–2007)

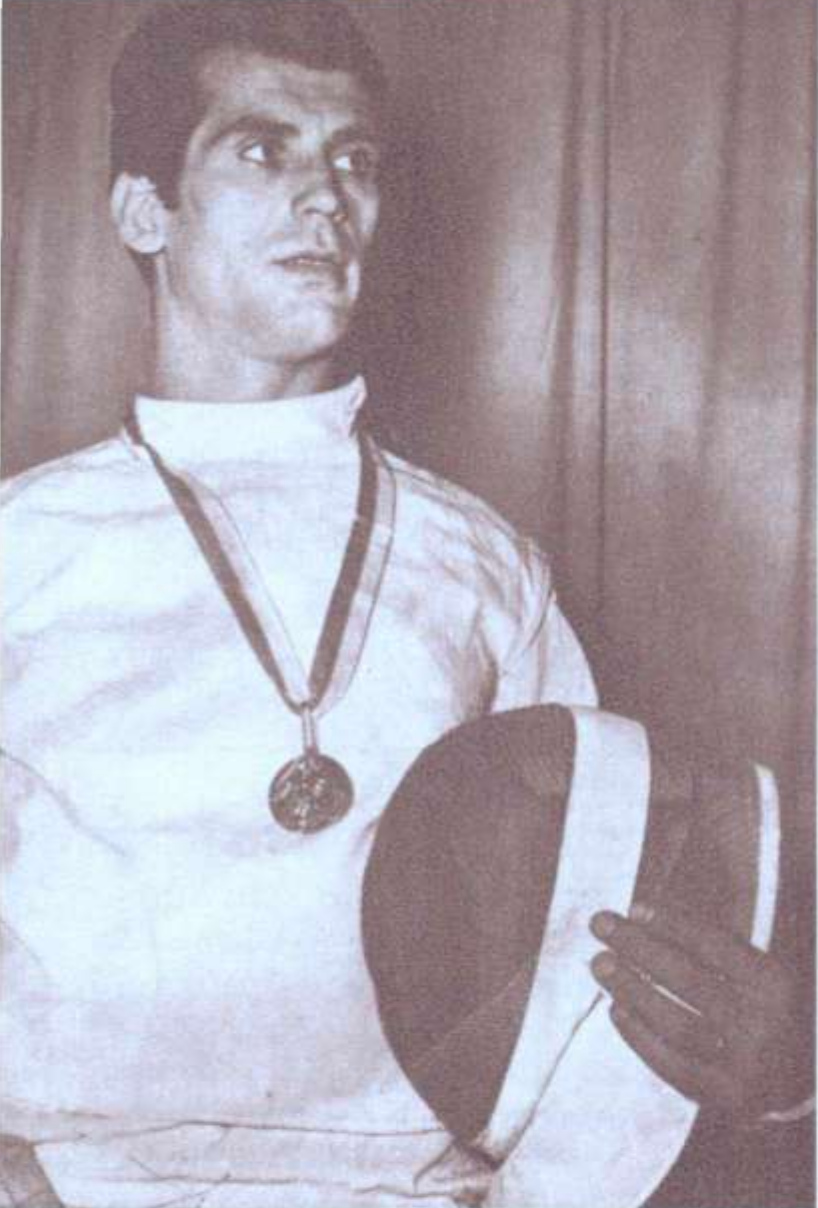

Personal information
- Born: 22 May 1940 Bucharest, Romania
- Died: 6 March 2007 (aged 66)
- Height: 1.78 m (5 ft 10 in)

Fencing career
- Sport: Fencing
- Weapon: foil
- Club: CSA Steaua
Medal record
Men's foil
Representing Romania
World Championships
| Gold medal – first place | 1967 Montreal | Team foil |
| Bronze medal – third place | 1970 Ankara | Team foil |

Tănase Mureșanu (22 May 1940 – 6 March 2007) is a Romanian foil fencer who served as federal coach for the Romanian Fencing Federation from 1974 to 2000.

== Career ==
Mureșanu took up fencing when he was 11 years old under coach Angelo Pellegrini at CS Progresul in Bucharest. He won the junior national championship in 1956 and 1957, then the senior championship in 1957, 1958 and 1963. He took a bronze medal in the 1958 Junior World Criterium in Bucharest and in the 1959 edition in Paris, both in foil and sabre.

In 1964 he transferred to CSA Steaua with coach Vasile Chelaru. Along with Iuliu Falb, Ion Drîmbă, Ștefan Ardeleanu and Mihai Țiu, he earned Romania's first team world title in fencing at the 1967 World Championships in Montreal. He competed at four Olympic Games from 1960 to 1972. For his accomplishments he was named "honoured master of sports" (maestru emerit al sportului) in 1968.

In parallel to his career as an athlete Mureșanu became a fencing coach at CS Viitorul. He was a federal coach for the Romanian Fencing Federation from 1974 to 2000 and served as international referee for the International Fencing Federation. He moved to Switzerland to pursue his coaching career. He died there on 6 March 2007.
