= Oleg Bovin =

Russian water polo player

Personal information
- Born: June 20, 1946 (age 80) Moscow, Soviet Union

Sport
- Sport: Water polo
Medal record
Representing Soviet Union
Olympic Games
Silver medal – second place	1968 Mexico City	Team competition

Oleg Georgiyevich Bovin (Russian: Олег Георгиевич Бовин, born 20 June 1946 in Moscow) is a Russian water polo player who competed for the Soviet Union in the 1968 Summer Olympics.

== See also ==
- Soviet Union men's Olympic water polo team records and statistics
- List of Olympic medalists in water polo (men)
- List of men's Olympic water polo tournament goalkeepers
