= Adam Lisewski =

Polish fencer (1944–2023)

Personal information
- Full name: Adam Michał Lisewski
- Born: 20 February 1944 Warsaw, General Government (now Poland)
- Died: 23 February 2023 (aged 79) Warsaw, Poland

Sport
- Sport: Fencing
Medal record
Men's fencing
Representing Poland
Olympic Games
Bronze medal – third place	1968 Mexico City	Foil, team

Adam Michał Lisewski (20 February 1944 – 23 February 2023) was a Polish fencer. He won a bronze medal in the team foil event at the 1968 Summer Olympics.

Lisewski died in Warsaw on 23 February 2023, at the age of 79.
