= Volodymyr Byelyayev =

Ukrainian volleyball player (born 1944)

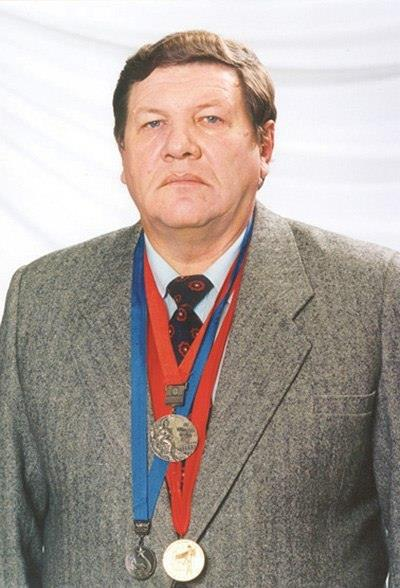

Personal information
- Full name: Volodymyr Ivanovich Byelyayev
- Nationality: Ukrainian; Soviet
- Born: 7 December 1944 (age 81) Michurinsk, Russian SFSR, Soviet Union

Volleyball information

National team
- Years: Team
- –: Soviet Union
Honours
Men's volleyball
Representing Soviet Union
Olympic Games
Gold medal – first place	1968 Mexico	Team
- Updated on 31 December 2017

Volodymyr Ivanovich Byelyayev (Ukrainian: Володимир Іванович Бєляєв, born 7 December 1944) is a Ukrainian former volleyball player who competed for the Soviet Union in the 1968 Summer Olympics.

He was born in the Michurinsk, Russian SFSR.

In 1968, he was part of the Soviet team which won the gold medal in the Olympic tournament. He played eight matches.
