= Viacheslav Skok =

Russian water polo player

Personal information
- Born: September 3, 1946 (age 79) Rzhev, Soviet Union

Sport
- Sport: Water polo
Medal record
Representing Soviet Union
Olympic Games
Silver medal – second place	1968 Mexico City	Team competition

Vyacheslav Aleksandrovich Skok (Russian: Вячеслав Александрович Скок, born 3 September 1946 in Rzhev) is a Russian water polo player, who competed for the Soviet Union in the 1968 Summer Olympics.

== See also ==
- List of Olympic medalists in water polo (men)
