= Borotín (Tábor District) =

- Market town
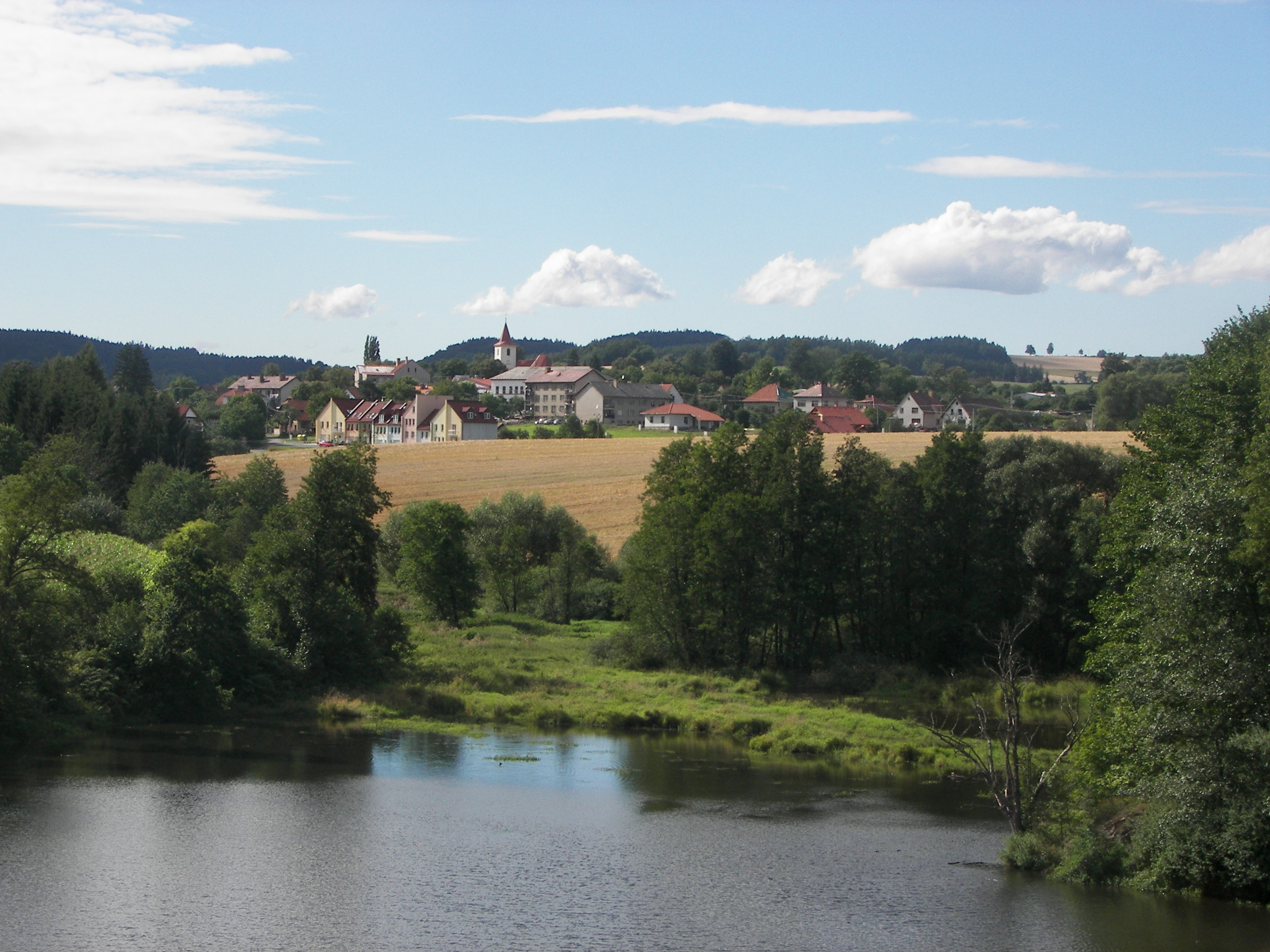
- View from the southeast

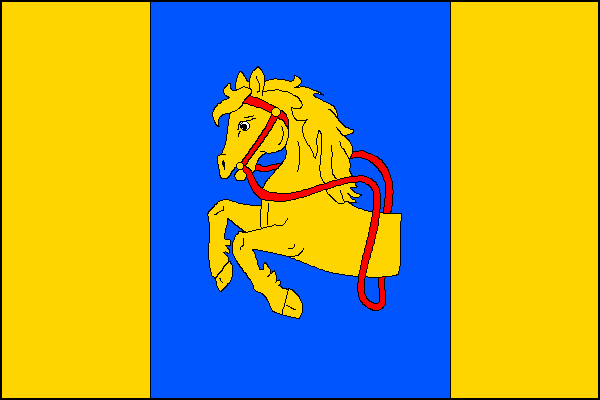
- Flag

- Location in the Czech Republic
- Coordinates: 49°30′18″N 14°36′47″E
- Country: Czech Republic
- Region: South Bohemian
- District: Tábor
- First mentioned: 1356

Area
  - Total: 26.26 km^{2} (10.14 sq mi)
- Elevation: 520 m (1,710 ft)

Population (2026-01-01)
  - Total: 724
  - Density: 27.6/km^{2} (71.4/sq mi)
- Time zone: UTC+1 (CET)
  - Summer (DST): UTC+2 (CEST)
- Postal code: 391 35
- Website: www.borotin.cz

Borotín (Czech pronunciation: [ˈborociːn]) is a market town in Tábor District in the South Bohemian Region of the Czech Republic. It has about 700 inhabitants.

== Administrative division ==
Borotín consists of 11 municipal parts (in brackets population according to the 2021 census):

- Borotín (535)
- Boratkov (7)
- Chomoutova Lhota (3)
- Hatov (11)
- Kamenná Lhota (16)
- Libenice (46)
- Nový Kostelec (38)
- Pejšova Lhota (5)
- Pikov (23)
- Předbojov (5)
- Sychrov (4)

== Etymology ==
The name Borotín is derived from the personal name Borota, meaning "Borota's (court)".

== Geography ==
Borotín is located about 10 kilometres (6 mi) north of Tábor and 60 km (37 mi) south of Prague. It lies in the Vlašim Uplands. The highest point is the hill Dehetník at 680 m (2,231 ft) above sea level. There are several fishponds in the municipal territory.

== History ==
The first written mention of Borotín is 1356. However, an old seal with the year 1333 was found, and according to the historians' theory, this is the year when Borotín was promoted to a market town. The church was first documented in 1373.

== Demographics ==
Historical population

Year	Pop.	±%
1869	2,096	—
1880	2,027	−3.3%
1890	1,779	−12.2%
1900	1,665	−6.4%
1910	1,549	−7.0%

Year	Pop.	±%
1921	1,477	−4.6%
1930	1,279	−13.4%
1950	925	−27.7%
1961	923	−0.2%
1970	762	−17.4%

Year	Pop.	±%
1980	634	−16.8%
1991	545	−14.0%
2001	510	−6.4%
2011	607	+19.0%
2021	693	+14.2%

Source: Censuses

== Transport ==
There are no railways or major roads passing through the municipality.

== Sights ==
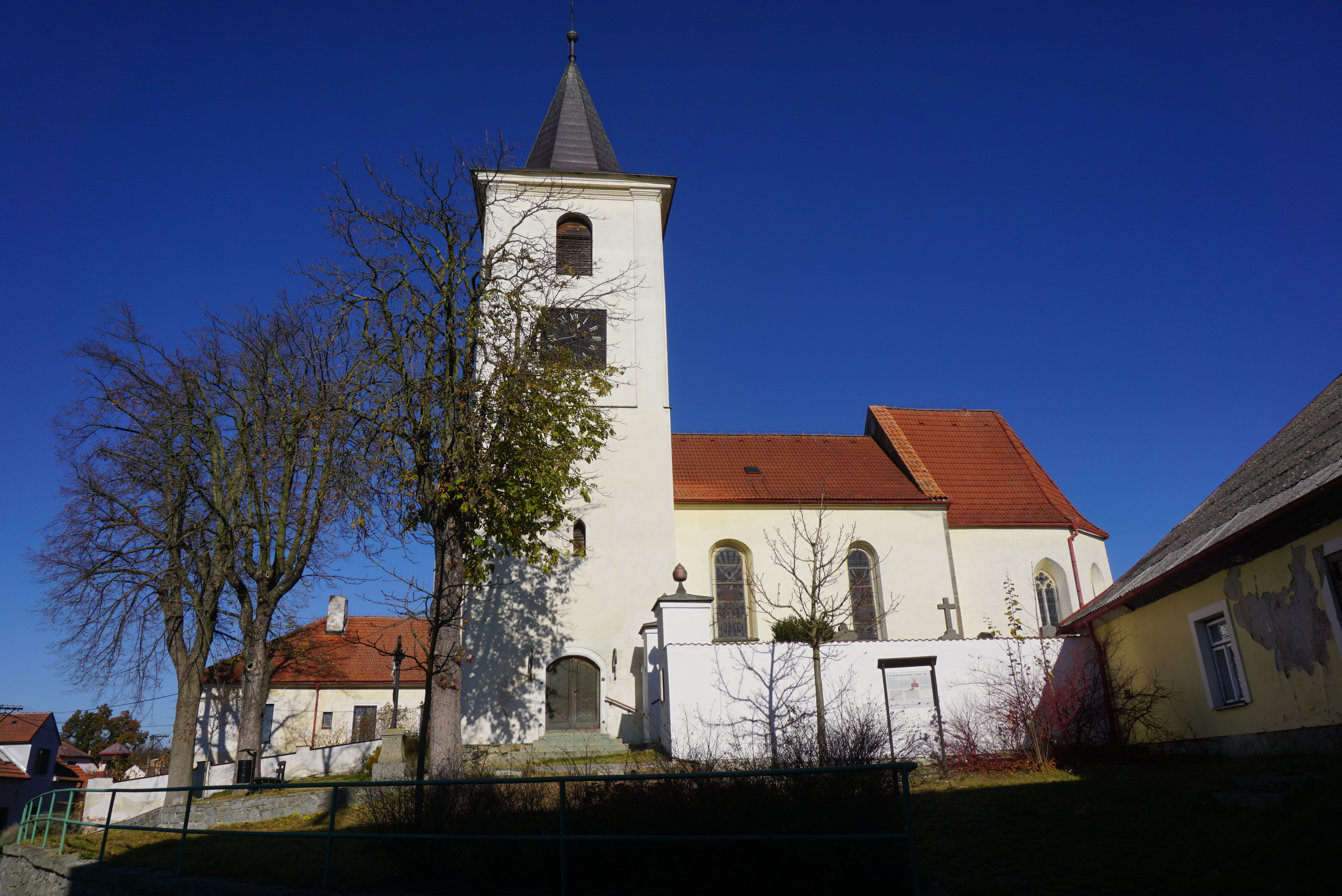
Church of the Ascension of Christ

The main landmark of Borotín is the Church of the Ascension of Christ. It was built in the mid-14th century. Despite reconstructions in 1796 and 1863, it has a preserved Romanesque nave and a Gothic tower.

The romantic ruins of Borotín Castle are located on the shore of the fishpond Starozámecký rybník. It was built in the 14th century. In 1623, during the Thirty Years' War, the castle was burned down. In the first half of the 19th century, part of the castle was demolished and the stone was used for construction purposes by villagers. The rest of the cylindrical tower and the adjacent Gothic palace have been preserved from the castle.
