= Russell Hobby (fencer) =

Australian fencer

Russell Keith Hobby
Personal information
- Born: 22 January 1933 (age 93) Fremantle, Western Australia, Australia

Sport
- Sport: Fencing
- Club: VRI Fencing Club
Medal record
Fencing
Representing Australia
British Empire Games
Silver medal – second place	1966 Kingston	Men's Team Foil
Bronze medal – third place	1966 Kingston	Men's Team Epee

Russell Keith Hobby (born 22 January 1933) is an Australian fencer. He competed at the 1964 and 1968 Summer Olympics. He was a longstanding member of the Melbourne-based VRI Fencing Club.
