= Ion Drîmbă =

Romanian fencer (1942–2006)

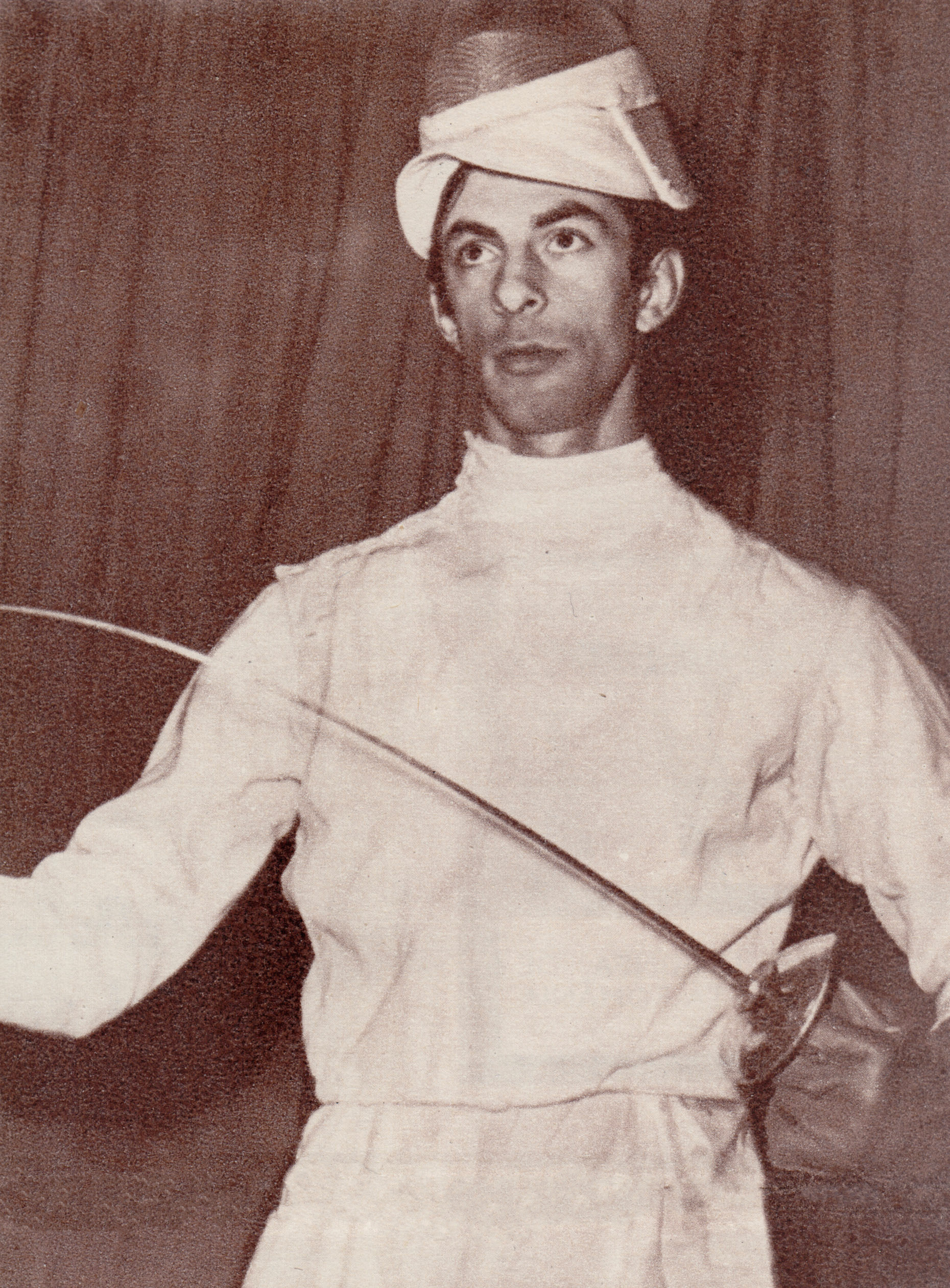
- Drîmbă in the 1960s

Personal information
- Full name: Ioan Alexandru Drîmbă
- Born: 18 March 1942 Timișoara, Romania
- Died: 20 February 2006 (aged 63) Brazil
- Height: 172 cm (5 ft 8 in)
- Weight: 59 kg (130 lb)

Sport
- Sport: Fencing
- Events: Foil, sabre
- Club: Steaua București
- Coached by: Andrei Altman
Medal record
Men's Fencing
Representing Romania
Olympic Games
Gold medal – first place	1968 Mexico City	Foil
World Championships
Gold medal – first place	1967 Montreal	Team foil
Bronze medal – third place	1969 Havana	Team foil

Ionel Alexandru "Ion" Drîmbă (also Drâmbă; March 18, 1942 – February 20, 2006) was a Romanian fencer. He competed at the 1960, 1964 and 1968 Olympics and won the first ever Olympic gold medal in fencing for Romania in 1968.

== Biography ==
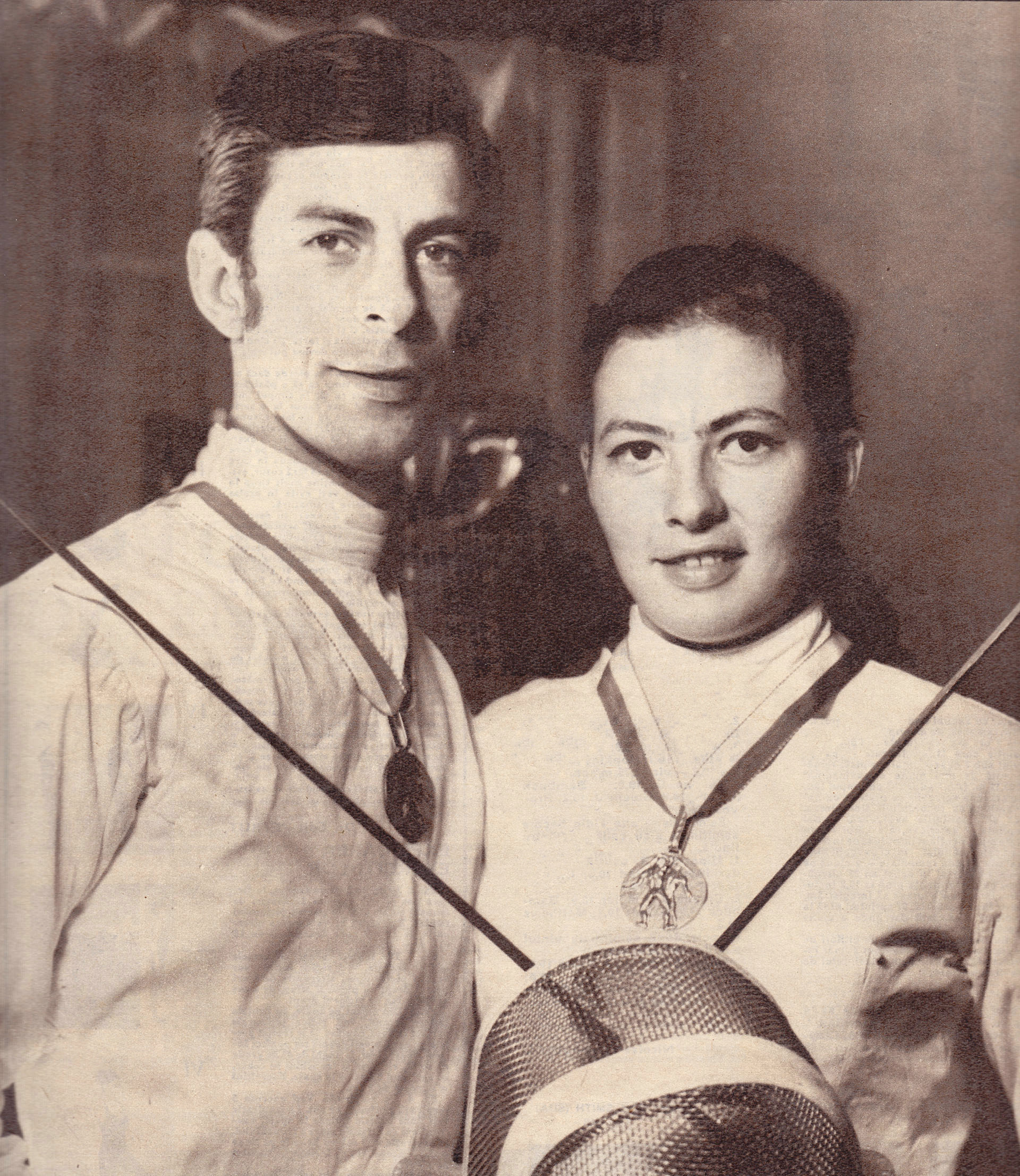
Drîmbă with Ileana Gyulai

Drîmbă was born in 1942 in Timișoara, in a working-class family. His father worked at the post office. He took up fencing aged 8 at the local club "Flacăra roșie" following his elder brother and quickly showed talent: he competed with seniors from the age of 13 both in foil and sabre and joined the national foil team at age 16. In 1959, he won the junior national championships in both weapons.

Drîmbă transferred to CSA Steaua București in 1960, when he was 18. He did not however join the Romanian Army, of which Steaua is the sports club, but worked as a civilian employee. That same year, he won the national championship in foil and won a silver medal in foil and reached the semi-finals in sabre at the Junior European Championships in Luxembourg. He took part in the 1960 Summer Olympics in Rome but did not earn any medal. He won a silver medal at the Junior World Championships in 1963. During this period he got to know foil fencer and fellow Stelist Ileana Gyulai, who would become his wife.

Drîmbă became team world champion in 1967 along with Ștefan Ardeleanu, Iuliu Falb, Tănase Mureșanu and Mihai Țiu. For this performance he was named "honored sports master" (Romanian: Maestru emerit al sportului). A year later he earned the first gold medal of Romanian fencing at the 1968 Summer Olympics in Mexico City with nineteen victories and two defeats. He also became European champion in 1968 and 1969. He was named the best foilist in the world by the International Sports Press Association (AIPS). The Romanian Government however failed to deliver the promised car and gave out only half the monetary reward it had initially announced.

Dissatisfied with the way he and the other high-performance athletes were treated in Romania, Drîmbă defected in 1970 to Germany during his stay in Paris for the Challenge Martini, a Fencing World Cup competition: he escaped an official dinner and found refuge at the West-German embassy. His name was subsequently deleted from official Romanian sports records. Drîmbă worked for about two years as a coach in Ulm under a contract with the German Fencing Federation. He trained amongst other German champions Matthias Behr and Alexander Pusch. He then left for the United States and settled down first in Tucson, Arizona, where he taught Fencing at Pima Community College. He met and married Cinda Gibson, with the hope of gaining citizenship, and they had a son, Jeffrey. They were divorced, and he then moved to San Francisco, where he opened his own fencing school. He also coached in Venezuela before opening another school, this time in Brazil. He remarried and had four children.

In 1996, he decided to return to Romania, where his name had been reinstated in historical records after the Revolution, in the hope that his coaching experience abroad would be rewarded. He received the grade of officer in the Order For Merit, but he did not get any job offer. He also had to retire his candidacy to the Romanian Olympic and Sports Committee. Disappointed, he went back to Brazil, where he died in 2006.

== Awards ==
- Sport Merit, First Class
- Honored Sports Master ("Maestru emerit al sportului")
