= Yury Dmitriyev =

Soviet cyclist

Personal information
- Born: 29 August 1946 (age 80) Dresden, Allied-occupied Germany

Cycling career
- Sport: Cycling

Yury Dmitriyev (born 29 August 1946) is a former Soviet cyclist. He competed in the individual road race and the team time trial events at the 1968 Summer Olympics.
