= Attila May =

Hungarian fencer (born 1942)

Personal information
- Born: 16 September 1942 (age 83) Kaposvár, Hungary

Sport
- Sport: Fencing

Attila May (born 16 September 1942) is a Hungarian fencer. He competed in the team foil event at the 1968 Summer Olympics.
