= Sándor Szabó (fencer) =

Hungarian fencer

Personal information
- Born: 29 January 1941 Budapest, Hungary
- Died: 7 August 1992 (aged 51)

Sport
- Sport: Fencing

Sándor Szabó (29 January 1941 – 7 August 1992) was a Hungarian fencer. He competed in the individual and team foil events at the 1964, 1968 and 1972 Summer Olympics.
