= Jeffrey Checkes =

American fencer

Personal information
- Born: May 30, 1943 (age 83) Brooklyn, New York, United States
- Died: December 25, 2024 Long Island, New York

Sport
- Sport: Fencing

Jeffrey Checkes (born May 30, 1943) is an American fencer. He competed in the individual and team foil events at the 1968 Summer Olympics.
