= Arcangelo Pinelli =

Italian fencer (born 1944)

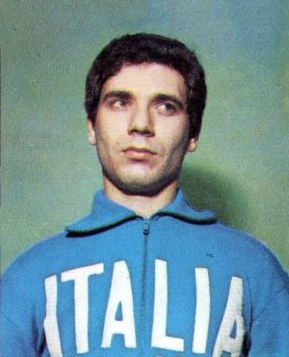
- Arcangelo Pinelli c. 1968

Personal information
- Born: 20 March 1944 (age 82) Caltanissetta, Italy
- Height: 1.73 m (5 ft 8 in)
- Weight: 76 kg (168 lb)

Sport
- Sport: Fencing
- Club: Circolo Della Spada, Venince
Medal record
Representing Italy
Summer Universiade
Gold medal – first place	1967 Tokyo	Individual foil
Silver medal – second place	1967 Tokyo	Team foil

Arcangelo Giacomo Pinelli (born 20 March 1944) is a retired Italian fencer. He competed at the 1964, 1968 and 1972 Summer Olympics in the individual and team foil events with the best result of seventh place with the Italian teams in 1964 and 1968.
