= Guillermo Saucedo =

Argentine fencer (born 1940)

Personal information
- Born: 23 November 1940 (age 85) Buenos Aires, Argentina

Sport
- Sport: Fencing

Guillermo Saucedo (born 23 November 1940) is an Argentine fencer. He competed at the 1968 and 1972 Summer Olympics.
