= Oļegs Antropovs =

Latvian volleyball player (1947–2023)

Personal information
- Full name: Oļegs Pyotrovich Antropovs
- Nationality: Soviet, Latvian
- Born: 5 November 1947; Noviy, South Kazakhstan Region, Kazakh SSR, USSR
- Died: 15 October 2023 (aged 75)
Honours
Men's volleyball
Representing Soviet Union
Olympic Games
Gold medal – first place	1968 Mexico City	Team

Oļegs Pyotrovich Antropovs (5 November 1947 – 15 October 2023) was a Latvian volleyball player who competed for the Soviet Union in the 1968 Summer Olympics.

== Biography ==
Antropovs was born in Noviy, Kazakh SSR on 5 November 1947. He played for Burevestnik Alma-Ata and Elektrotechnika Riga.

In 1968, Antropovs was part of the Soviet team which won the gold medal in the Olympic tournament. He played four matches.

In 1998, he was head coach of men's national team of Russia, which became the silver medalist in the FIVB Volleyball World League.

After 1999, he worked for nine years in Japan with the club Jay-T (Hiroshima), repeatedly won medals of the national championship and the Emperor's Cup.

Antropovs died on 15 October 2023, at the age of 75.
