= Orlando Ruíz =

Cuban fencer (1935–2017)

Personal information
- Born: 5 October 1935 Las Villas, Cuba
- Died: 3 December 2017 (aged 82)

Sport
- Sport: Fencing

Orlando Ruíz (5 October 1935 – 3 December 2017) was a Cuban fencer. He competed in the individual and team foil and team épée events at the 1968 Summer Olympics.
