= Larry Anastasi =

American fencer (1934–2024)

Personal information
- Full name: Lawrence Joseph Anastasi
- Born: September 6, 1934 Philadelphia, Pennsylvania, U.S.
- Died: June 25, 2024 (aged 89)

Sport
- Sport: Fencing

Lawrence Joseph Anastasi (September 6, 1934 – June 25, 2024) was an American foil and épée fencer.

Anastasi was born in Philadelphia, Pennsylvania on September 6, 1934. He competed at the 1964 and 1968 Summer Olympics. On June 26, 2013, Anastasi was inducted into the United States Fencing Hall of Fame. He died on June 25, 2024, at the age of 89.

== See also ==
- List of USFA Hall of Fame members
