= Valeri Kravchenko =

Soviet volleyball player

Personal information
- Full name: Valeri Ivanovich Kravchenko
- Nickname: Валерий Иванович Кравченко
- Nationality: Soviet
- Born: 2 February 1939 Kabodiyen, Khatlon, Tajik SSR, Soviet Union
- Died: 3 September 1996 (aged 57) Ukraine
Honours
Men's volleyball
Representing Soviet Union
Olympic Games
Gold medal – first place	1968 Mexico City	Team
Bronze medal – third place	1972 Munich	Team

Valeri Ivanovich Kravchenko (Russian: Валерий Иванович Кравченко, 2 February 1939 – 3 September 1996) is a Soviet former volleyball player who competed for the Soviet Union in the 1968 Summer Olympics and in the 1972 Summer Olympics. He was born in the Kabodiyen, Khatlon, Tajik SSR. He played for Burevestnik Alma-Ata. In 1968, he was part of the Soviet team which won the gold medal in the Olympic tournament. He played eight matches. Four years later he won the bronze medal with the Soviet team in the 1972 Olympic tournament. He played six matches.
