= Mohamed Gamil El-Kalyoubi =

Egyptian fencer (born 1937)

Personal information
- Born: 7 April 1937 (age 89) Cairo, Egypt

Sport
- Sport: Fencing
Medal record
Mediterranean Games
Gold medal – first place	1959 Beirut	Individual foil
Silver medal – second place	1959 Beirut	Team foil
Bronze medal – third place	1955 Barcelona	Team sabre

Mohamed Gamil El-Kalyoubi (Arabic: محمد جميل الكليوبي; born 7 April 1937) is an Egyptian former foil and sabre fencer. He competed at the 1960, 1964 and 1968 Summer Olympics. At the 1960 Games, he represented the United Arab Republic.

He also competed at the Mediterranean Games in 1955, winning a bronze medal in the team sabre event, and in 1959, winning a gold medal in the individual foil event and a silver medal in the team foil event.

After his athletic career, he moved to the United States and served as the head fencing coach at Wellesley College until his retirement following the 2015 season.
