= Dagoberto Borges =

Cuban fencer

Personal information
- Born: 16 January 1940 Havana, Cuba
- Died: 12 August 1998 (aged 58)

Sport
- Sport: Fencing

Dagoberto Borges (16 January 1940 – 12 August 1998) was a Cuban fencer. He competed in the individual and team foil events at the 1968 Summer Olympics.
