= Vasile Chelaru =

Romanian fencer (1921–1999)

Personal information
- Born: 13 June 1921 Șerbești (now Ștefan cel Mare, Neamț), Romania
- Died: 1 March 1999 (aged 77) Bucharest, Romania

Fencing career
- Sport: Fencing
- Weapon: foil, épée, sabre
- Hand: left-handed

Vasile Chelaru (13 June 1921 – 1 March 1999) was a Romanian fencer.

== Early life ==
Chelaru was born in Șerbești (now Ștefan cel Mare) in Neamț County. He went to military school in 1941, then followed the three-year course of the Military Institute of Physical Education.

== Career ==
Chelaru became interested in fencing during the course of his studies and graduated in this speciality in 1946. Trained in all three weapons, he competed in individual and team foil, as well as in individual sabre at the 1952 Summer Olympics in Helsinki. A year after he won the Romanian national championship in foil.

In 1957 he became a coach at Casa Centrală a Armatei, now CSA Steaua București. He also took responsibility of the national foil teams. Under his guidance, the men's team won Romania's first world title in fencing at the 1967 World Fencing Championships in Montreal, Ion Drîmbă won the gold medal in foil at the 1968 Summer Olympics in Mexico City and the women's team won the world title at the 1969 World Fencing Championships in Havana. For his accomplishments Chelaru was named "honoured coach" (antrenor emerit) in 1968.

== Death ==
Chelaru died on 1 March 1999 in Bucharest.
