= Vasilijus Matuševas =

Lithuanian volleyball player (1945–1989)

Personal information
- Full name: Vasilijus Matuševas
- Nationality: Lithuanian
- Born: 18 October 1945 Žagarinė, Ignalina district municipality, Lithuanian SSR, Soviet Union
- Died: 1 October 1989 (aged 43) Vilnius, Lithuanian SSR, Soviet Union
Honours
Men's volleyball
Representing Soviet Union
Olympic Games
Gold medal – first place	1968 Mexico City	Team

Vasilijus Matuševas (18 October 1945 – 1 October 1989) was a Lithuanian former volleyball player who competed for the Soviet Union in the 1968 Summer Olympics.

He was born in Žagarinė, Ignalina district municipality.

In 1968, he was part of the Soviet team which won the gold medal in the Olympic tournament. He played two matches.
