= Yevhen Lapinsky =

Ukrainian volleyball player (1942–1999)

Yevgeny Lapinsky
Personal information
- Full name: Yevhen Valentinovich Lapinsky
- Nickname: Євген Валентинович Лапинський
- Born: 23 March 1942 Krasnoye Zagorye, Voronezh Oblast, Russian SFSR, Soviet Union
- Died: 29 September 1999 (aged 57) Odesa, Ukraine
Medal record
Men's volleyball
Representing Soviet Union
Olympic Games
Gold medal – first place	1968 Mexico City	Team
Bronze medal – third place	1972 Munich	Team

Yevhen Valentinovich Lapinsky (Ukrainian: Євген Валентинович Лапинський, 23 March 1942 – 29 September 1999), also known as Yevgeny Lapinsky, was a Ukrainian former volleyball player who competed for the Soviet Union in the 1968 Summer Olympics and in the 1972 Summer Olympics. He played for Burevestnik Odesa.

He was Jewish, and was born in the Krasnoye Zagorye, Voronezh, Russian SFSR.

In 1968, he was part of the Soviet team which won the gold medal in the Olympic tournament. He played all nine matches.

Four years later, in 1972, he won the bronze medal with the Soviet team in the 1972 Olympic tournament. He played four matches.

== See also ==
- List of select Jewish volleyball players
