= Fujio Shimizu =

Japanese fencer

Personal information
- Born: 29 January 1940 (age 86) Tokyo, Japan

Sport
- Sport: Fencing

Fujio Shimizu (清水 富士夫, Shimizu Fujio; born 29 January 1940) is a Japanese foil and sabre fencer. He competed at the 1964 and 1968 Summer Olympics.
