= Volodymyr Ivanov (volleyball) =

Ukrainian volleyball player (born 1940)

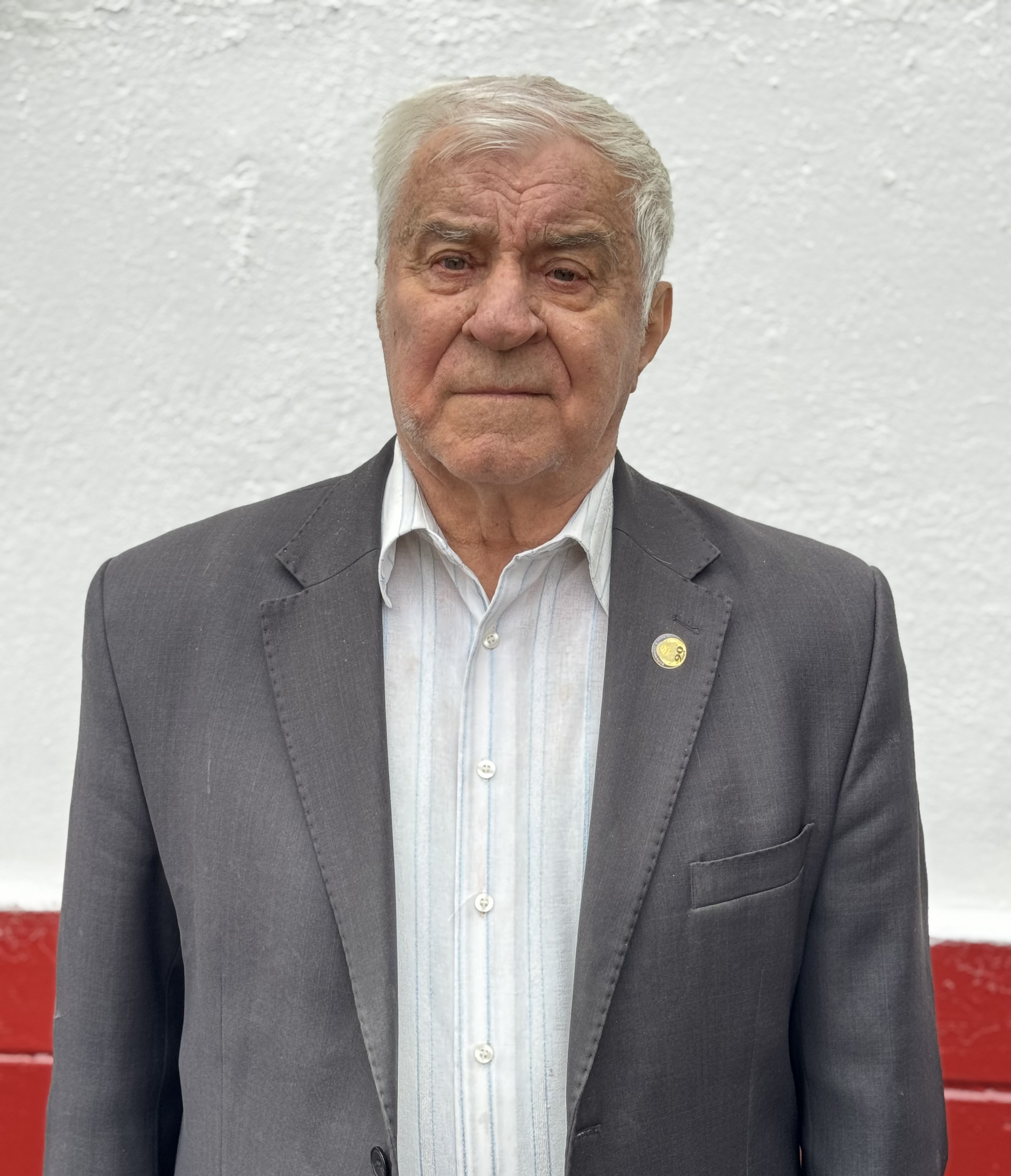

Personal information
- Full name: Volodymyr Timofiyovich Ivanov
- Nickname: Володимир Тимофійович Іванов
- Nationality: Russian; Ukrainian
- Born: 10 September 1940 (age 86) Gomel, Belarusian SSR, Soviet Union

Volleyball information

National team
- Years: Team
- –: Soviet Union men's national volleyball team
Honours
Men's volleyball
Representing Soviet Union
Olympic Games
Gold medal – first place	1968 Mexico City	Team

Volodymyr Timofiyovich Ivanov (Ukrainian: Володимир Тимофійович Іванов, born 10 September 1940) is a Ukrainian former volleyball player who competed for the Soviet Union in the 1968 Summer Olympics.

He was born in the Gomel, Byelorussian SSR.

In 1968, he was part of the Soviet team which won the gold medal in the Olympic tournament. He played eight matches.
