= Evaristo Prendes =

Argentine fencer (born 1934)

Personal information
- Born: 23 May 1934 (age 92) Buenos Aires, Argentina

Sport
- Sport: Fencing

Evaristo Prendes (born 23 May 1934) is an Argentine fencer. He competed in the individual and team foil events at the 1968 Summer Olympics.
