= Viktor Putyatin =

Soviet fencer (1941–2021)

Personal information
- Born: Viktor Pavlovych Putyatin; 12 September 1941 Kharkiv, Ukrainian SSR, Soviet Union
- Died: 2 November 2021 (aged 80) Kyiv, Ukraine
- Height: 187 cm (6 ft 2 in)
- Weight: 80 kg (176 lb)

Sport
- Sport: Fencing
Medal record
Representing Soviet Union
Olympic Games
| Silver medal – second place | 1968 Mexico City | Team foil |
| Silver medal – second place | 1972 Munich | Team foil |
World Championships
| Gold medal – first place | 1965 Paris | Team foil |
| Gold medal – first place | 1966 Moscow | Team foil |
| Gold medal – first place | 1967 Montreal | Individual foil |
| Gold medal – first place | 1969 Havana | Team foil |
| Gold medal – first place | 1970 Ankara | Team foil |
| Silver medal – second place | 1967 Montreal | Team foil |
| Bronze medal – third place | 1966 Moscow | Individual foil |
| Bronze medal – third place | 1971 Vienna | Team foil |
Summer Universiade
| Silver medal – second place | 1965 Budapest | Individual foil |

Viktor Pavlovych Putyatin (Ukrainian: Віктор Павлович Путятін; 12 September 1941 – 2 November 2021) was a Soviet and Ukrainian fencer. He won silver medals in the team foil events at the 1968 and 1972 Summer Olympics.

Putyatin died in Kyiv on 2 November 2021, at the age of 80.
