= Viktor Mikhalchuk =

Ukrainian volleyball player (born 1946)

Olympic medal record

Men's Volleyball
Gold medal – first place	1968 Mexico City	Team

Viktor Illich Mikhalchuk (Ukrainian: Віктор Ілліч Михальчук, born 5 February 1946) is a Ukrainian former volleyball player who competed for the Soviet Union in the 1968 Summer Olympics.

He was born in the Barnaul, Russian SFSR.

In 1968, he was part of the Soviet team which won the gold medal in the Olympic tournament. He played eight matches.
