= Heizaburo Ōkawa =

Japanese fencer (born 1939)

Personal information
- Native name: 大川 平三郎
- Born: 2 December 1939 (age 86) Tokyo, Japan

Sport
- Sport: Fencing

Heizaburo Ōkawa (大川 平三郎, Ōkawa Heizaburō; born 2 December 1939) is a Japanese and American fencer and fencing coach based in Southern California. He competed at the 1960, 1964 and 1968 Summer Olympics.

== Early life and education ==
Ōkawa was born in Tokyo and graduated from Chuo University in 1962. He pursued further studies at the National Institute of Sports in Paris.

== International competition ==
Ōkawa represented Japan at three Summer Olympics, in 1960, 1964, and 1968. He represented Japan at world fencing championships in 1962, 1963, 1965, 1966, and 1967, and coached the Japanese team at international events in 1969, 1987, 1988, 1989, 1993, 1994, and 1998. He was a fencing referee at the 1988 Summer Olympics in Seoul.

At the 1966 Grand International Invitational Tournament in Tucson, Arizona, Ōkawa was awarded three major trophies, winning in men's sabre, foil, and epee competitions. He also won the men's foil competition at the U.S. National Fencing Championships in 1967. In 1969 he coached the Japanese team at an international competition in Cuba.

== Coaching in the United States ==
In 1975, Okawa was one of the stars of The Eagle Within, a film and "multi-media tribute to America's Bicentennial" presented at Busch Gardens parks through the end of 1976.

Ōkawa lived in Torrance, California, with his wife Jeanie and their three children, after his Olympic victories. He taught and coached fencing to actors in Beverly Hills, at the University of California, Los Angeles from 1974 to 1980, and at California State University, Fullerton, from 1980 until his retirement in June 2006. "You have to be a good athlete to be a fencer," he explained in a 1977 interview. "You must have stamina, speed, and intelligence. Mental attitude is very important." American fencer Janice Romary was one of his fencing partners; she was coached by his father-in-law, kendo expert Torao Mori.

== Awards and honors ==
Okawa was inducted into the U.S Fencing Association Hall of Fame in 2004, and into the CSU Fulllerton Athletics Hall of Fame in 2019. In 2022 he was one of the Pioneer Spirit Award honorees of the Nisei Week Foundation in Los Angeles.

== See also ==
- List of USFA Hall of Fame members
