= Borotín (Blansko District) =

- Municipality
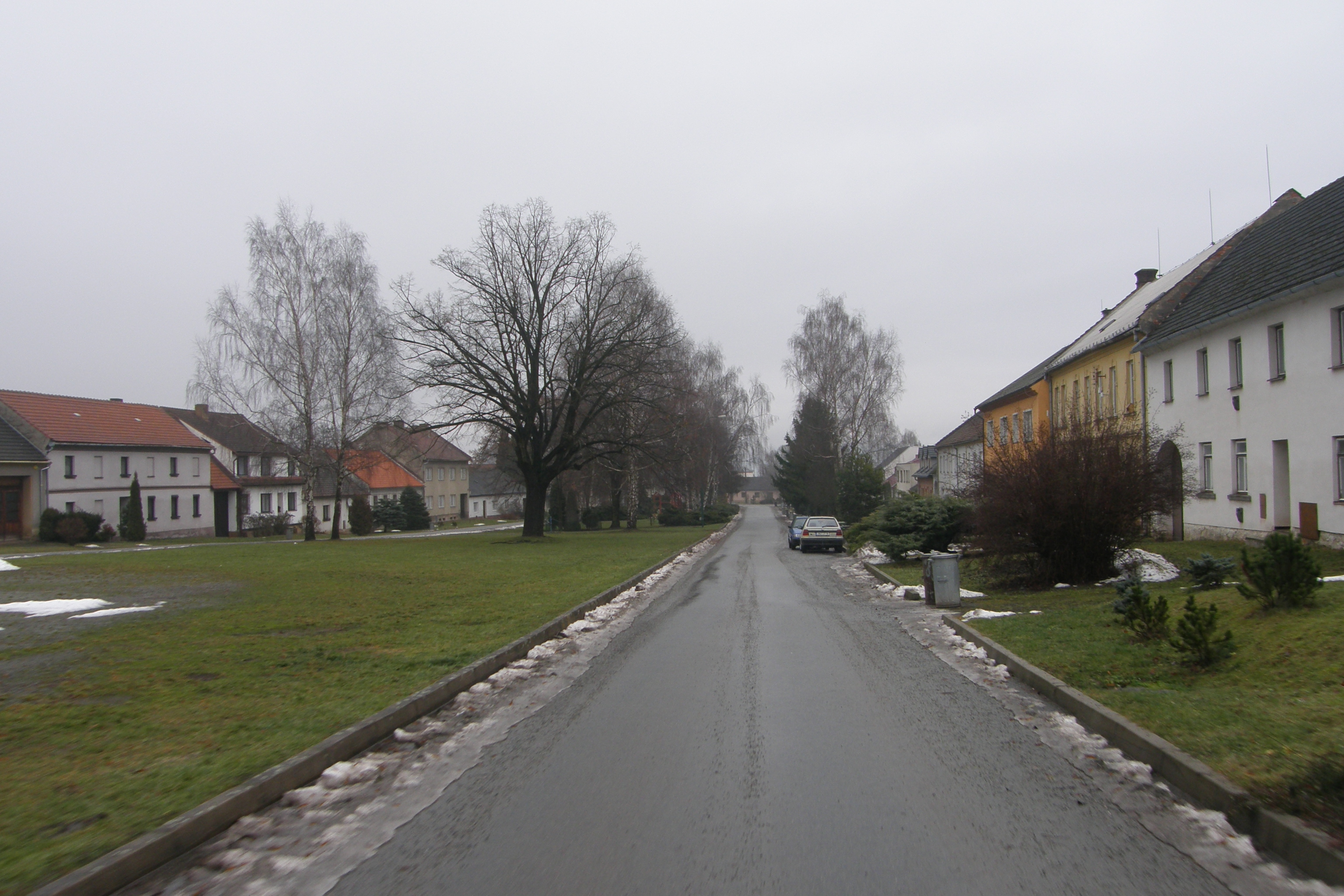
- Centre of Borotín

- Flag Coat of arms

- Location in the Czech Republic
- Coordinates: 49°34′53″N 16°40′17″E
- Country: Czech Republic
- Region: South Moravian
- District: Blansko
- First mentioned: 1365

Area
  - Total: 7.62 km^{2} (2.94 sq mi)
- Elevation: 420 m (1,380 ft)

Population (2026-01-01)
  - Total: 429
  - Density: 56.3/km^{2} (146/sq mi)
- Time zone: UTC+1 (CET)
  - Summer (DST): UTC+2 (CEST)
- Postal code: 679 37
- Website: www.obecborotin.cz

Borotín is a municipality and village in Blansko District in the South Moravian Region of the Czech Republic. It has about 400 inhabitants.

== Geography ==
Borotín is located about 24 kilometres (15 mi) north of Blansko and 40 km (25 mi) north of Brno. It lies on the border between the Boskovice Furrow and Orlické Foothills. The highest point is the hill U Vlčí jámy at 568 m (1,864 ft) above sea level.

== History ==
The first written mention of Borotín is from 1365.

== Demographics ==
Historical population

Year	Pop.	±%
1869	720	—
1880	707	−1.8%
1890	752	+6.4%
1900	719	−4.4%
1910	784	+9.0%

Year	Pop.	±%
1921	793	+1.1%
1930	726	−8.4%
1950	547	−24.7%
1961	575	+5.1%
1970	654	+13.7%

Year	Pop.	±%
1980	623	−4.7%
1991	555	−10.9%
2001	438	−21.1%
2011	407	−7.1%
2021	417	+2.5%

Source: Censuses

== Transport ==
There are no railways or major roads passing through the municipality.

== Sights ==
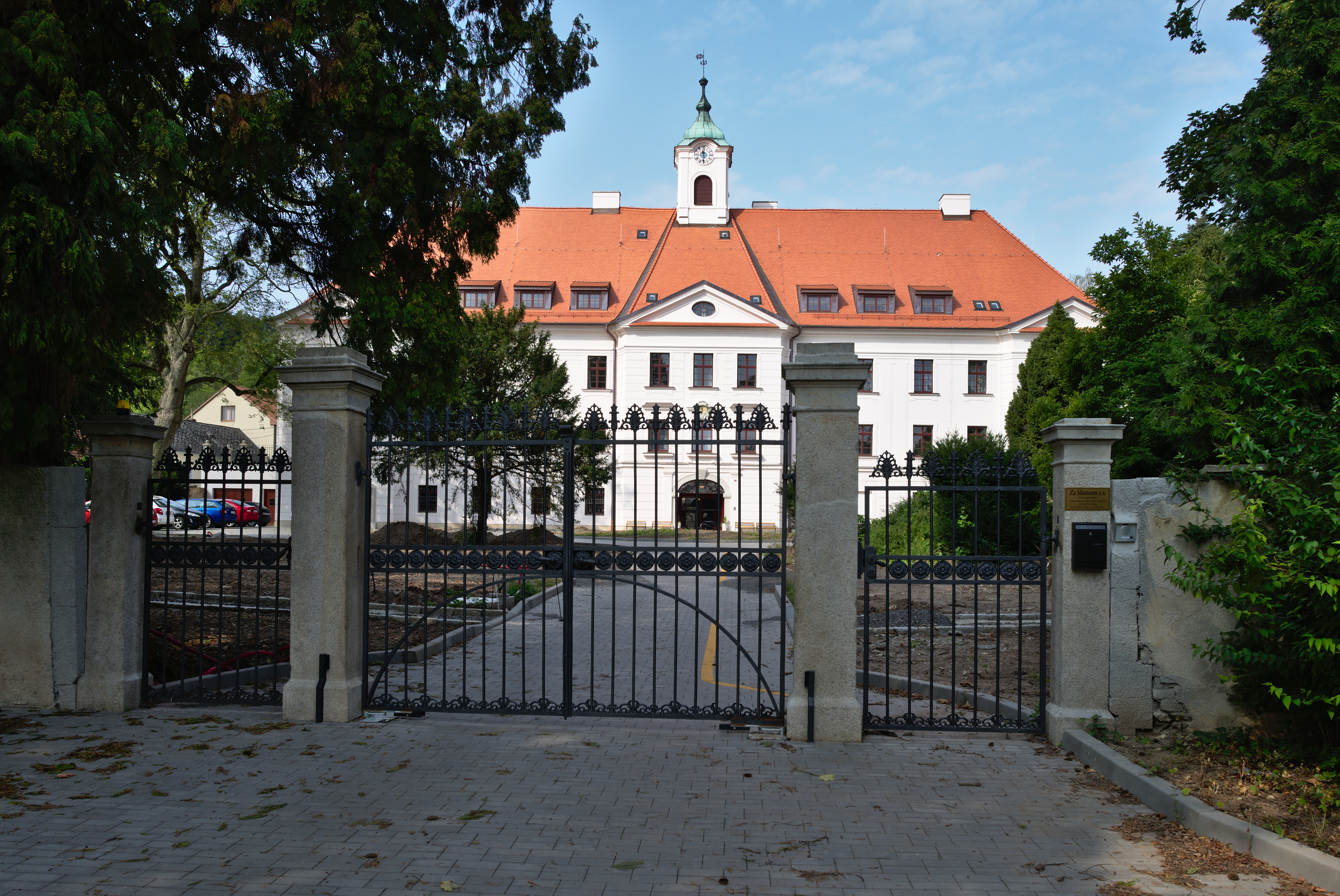
Borotín Castle

The main landmarks of Borotín are the church and the castle. The Borotín Castle was built in the late Baroque style in 1753. It has a valuable chapel dating from 1774, decorated with frescoes by Josef Stern. Today the building houses a retirement home.

The Church of the Exaltation of the Holy Cross was built in 1786–1788, also in the late Baroque style. However, the tower of the newly built church soon collapsed and had to be rebuilt at the turn of the 18th and 19th centuries.
