= Moustafa Soheim =

Egyptian fencer (1937–2008)

Personal information
- Born: 20 March 1937 Cairo, Egypt
- Died: 1 March 2008 (aged 70) Cairo, Egypt

Sport
- Country: Egypt
- Sport: Fencing
Medal record
Mediterranean Games
| Silver medal – second place | 1959 Beirut | Team foil |

Moustafa Soheim (20 March 1937 – 1 March 2008) was an Egyptian foil fencer. He competed at the 1960, 1964 and 1968 Summer Olympics. At the 1960 Games, he represented the United Arab Republic.

He also competed at the 1959 Mediterranean Games where he won a silver medal in the team foil event.
