= Kazuo Mano =

Japanese fencer (born 1940)

Personal information
- Born: 8 March 1940 (age 86) Shiga Prefecture, Japan

Sport
- Sport: Fencing

Kazuo Mano (真野 一夫, Mano Kazuo; born 8 March 1940) is a Japanese fencer. He competed in the individual and team foil events at the 1964 and 1968 Summer Olympics.
