= Pasquale La Ragione =

Italian fencer (born 1943)

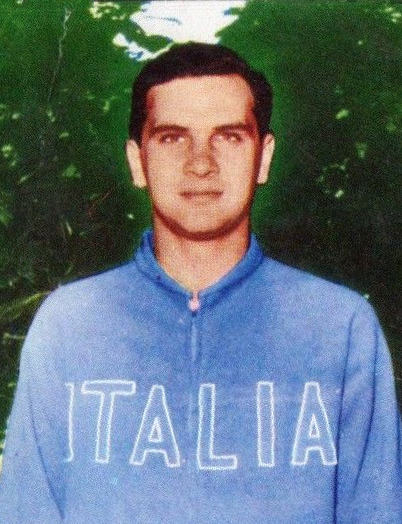
- Pasquale La Ragione c. 1966

Personal information
- Born: 28 November 1943 (age 82) Cava dei Tirreni, Italy
- Height: 1.71 m (5 ft 7 in)
- Weight: 81 kg (179 lb)

Sport
- Sport: Fencing
- Club: C. N. Posillipo, Napoli
Medal record
Mediterranean Games
Silver medal – second place	1963 Naples	Individual foil

Pasquale La Ragione (born 28 November 1943) is a retired Italian fencer. He competed in the individual and team foil events at the 1964 and 1968 Summer Olympics and finished in seventh place with the Italian team at both Games. He also won a silver medal at the 1963 Mediterranean Games in the individual foil event.
