= Borys Tereshchuk =

Ukrainian volleyball player (1945–2011)

Personal information
- Full name: Borys Pavlovich Tereshchuk
- Nickname: Борис Павлович Терещук
- Nationality: Ukrainian
- Born: March 18, 1945 Kyiv, Ukrainian SSR, Soviet Union
- Died: June 10, 2011 (aged 66)

Volleyball information

National team
- Years: Team
- –: Soviet Union men's national volleyball team
Honours
Men's volleyball
Representing Soviet Union
Olympic Games
Gold medal – first place	1968 Mexico City	Team

Borys Pavlovich Tereshchuk (Ukrainian: Борис Павлович Терещук; 18 March 1945 – 10 June 2011) was a Ukrainian former volleyball player who competed for the Soviet Union in the 1968 Summer Olympics. He was born in Kyiv. In 1968, he was part of the Soviet team that won the gold medal in the Olympic tournament. He played eight matches.
