= Félix Piñero =

Venezuelan fencer (born 1945)

Personal information
- Born: 23 December 1945 (age 80) Caracas, Venezuela

Sport
- Sport: Fencing

Félix Piñero (born 23 December 1945) is a Venezuelan fencer. He competed in the individual and team foil and individual épée events at the 1968 Summer Olympics.
