= Silvio Fernández (fencer born 1946) =

Venezuelan fencer

Personal information
- Born: 21 April 1946 (age 80) Caracas, Venezuela

Sport
- Sport: Fencing

Silvio Fernández (born 21 April 1946) is a Venezuelan fencer. He competed in the individual and team foil and individual épée events at the 1968 Summer Olympics.
