= Freddy Salazar =

Venezuelan fencer

Freddy José Salazar Ramirez
Personal information
- Born: 11 April 1949 (age 77) Caracas, Venezuela

Sport
- Sport: Fencing

Freddy José Salazar Ramirez (born 11 April 1949) is a Venezuelan fencer. He competed in the individual and team foil events at the 1968 Summer Olympics.
