= Mihai Țiu =

Romanian fencer (born 1946)

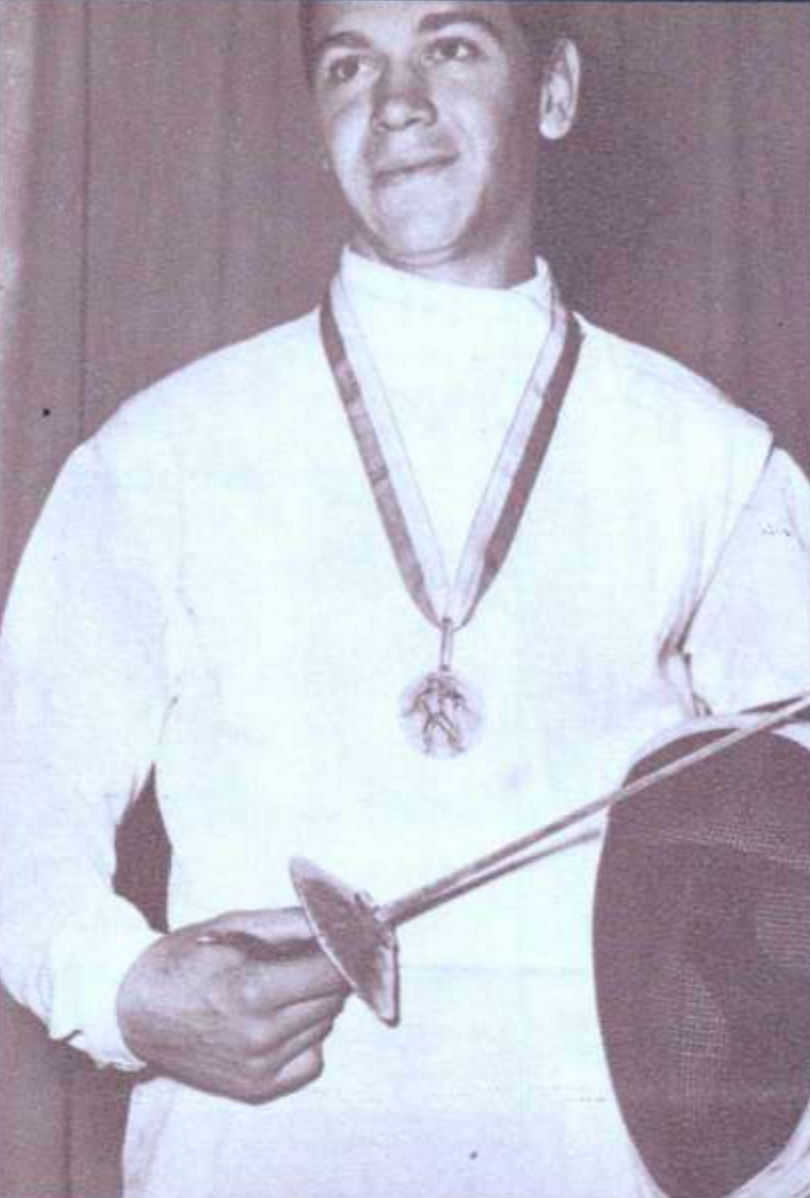

Personal information
- Born: 25 January 1946 (age 80) Bucharest, Romania

Sport
- Sport: Fencing
Medal record
Representing Romania
World Championships
Gold medal – first place	1967 Montreal	Team foil
Bronze medal – third place	1969 Havana	Team foil
Bronze medal – third place	1970 Ankara	Team foil
Summer Universiade
Silver medal – second place	1973 Moscow	Individual foil

Mihai Țiu (born 25 January 1946) is a Romanian fencer. He competed in the individual and team foil events at the 1968, 1972, 1976 and 1980 Summer Olympics.
