= Fencing at the 1976 Summer Olympics – Men's foil =

Fencing at the Olympics

Men's foil at the Games of the XXI Olympiad
- Fencing pictogram
- Venue: University of Montréal
- Dates: 20–21 July 1976
- Competitors: 56 from 23 nations

Medalists
| 1st place, gold medalist(s) | | Fabio Dal Zotto | Italy |
| 2nd place, silver medalist(s) | | Aleksandr Romankov | Soviet Union |
| 3rd place, bronze medalist(s) | | Bernard Talvard | France |

The men's foil was one of eight fencing events on the fencing at the 1976 Summer Olympics programme. It was the seventeenth appearance of the event. The competition was held from 20 to 21 July 1976. A total of 56 fencers from 23 nations competed. Nations had been limited to three fencers each since 1928. The event was won by Fabio Dal Zotto of Italy, the nation's first victory in the men's foil since 1936 and fifth overall (second all-time behind France's seven). Italy had not reached the podium in the event since 1956. Aleksandr Romankov's silver was the Soviet Union's first medal in the event since 1960. In contrast, France won its fourth consecutive bronze medal with Bernard Talvard's third-place finish.

== Background ==
This was the 17th appearance of the event, which has been held at every Summer Olympics except 1908 (when there was a foil display only rather than a medal event). Five of the six finalists from 1972 returned (all except champion Witold Woyda of Poland): two-time silver medalist (and 1964 fifth-place finisher) Jenő Kamuti of Hungary, bronze medalist (and 1968 finalist) Christian Noël of France, fourth-place finisher (and 1968 finalist) Mihai Țiu of Romania, fifth-place finisher Vladimir Denisov of the Soviet Union, and sixth-place finisher Marek Dąbrowski of Poland. Noël had won the 1973 and 1975 world championships; Aleksandr Romankov of the Soviet Union was the 1974 champion.

Kuwait made its debut in the men's foil; East Germany competed separately for the first time. The United States made its 16th appearance, most of any nation, having missed only the inaugural 1896 competition.

== Competition format ==
The 1976 tournament returned to a mix of pool and knockout rounds similar to that used in 1968, after the 1972 edition briefly used a pool-only format. The competition included three pool rounds, followed by a double-elimination knockout round, finishing with a final pool round. In each pool round, the fencers competed in a round-robin.

Bouts in the round-robin pools were to 5 touches; bouts in the double-elimination round were to 10 touches. Repechages were not used in the first three rounds, but were used to determine medalists if necessary in the final.

== Schedule ==
All times are Eastern Daylight Time (UTC-4)

| Date | Time | Round |
|---|---|---|
| Tuesday, 20 July 1976 | 8:30; 11:00; 15:00; 18:00 | Round 1 Round 2 Round 3 Elimination rounds |
| Wednesday, 21 July 1976 | 18:00 | Final |

== Results ==
=== Round 1 ===
==== Round 1 Pool A ====
| Pos | Fencer | W | L | TF | TA | Qual. | CN | KH | JG | GB | SS | KR | AAA |
|---|---|---|---|---|---|---|---|---|---|---|---|---|---|
| 1 | Christian Noël (FRA) | 6 | 0 | 30 | 11 | Q | | 5–2 | 5–4 | 5–1 | 5–0 | 5–3 | 5–1 |
| 2 | Klaus Haertter (GDR) | 4 | 2 | 25 | 10 | Q | 2–5 | | 3–5 | 5–0 | 5–0 | 5–0 | 5–0 |
| 3 | Jorge Garbey (CUB) | 4 | 2 | 25 | 18 | Q | 4–5 | 5–3 | | 1–5 | 5–1 | 5–3 | 5–1 |
| 4 | Greg Benko (AUS) | 3 | 3 | 20 | 16 | Q | 1–5 | 0–5 | 5–1 | | 4–5 | 5–0 | 5–0 |
| 5 | Stefano Simoncelli (ITA) | 3 | 3 | 16 | 21 | | 0–5 | 0–5 | 1–5 | 5–4 | | 5–2 | 5–0 |
| 6 | Kam Roger (HKG) | 1 | 5 | 13 | 29 | | 3–5 | 0–5 | 3–5 | 0–5 | 2–5 | | 5–4 |
| 7 | Ahmed Al-Arbeed (KUW) | 0 | 6 | 6 | 30 | | 1–5 | 0–5 | 1–5 | 0–5 | 0–5 | 4–5 | |

Source: Official Report, vol. 3, p. 223

==== Round 1 Pool B ====
| Pos | Fencer | W | L | TF | TA | Qual. | MT | ESa | BT | BP | ESi | NWB | ANAS |
|---|---|---|---|---|---|---|---|---|---|---|---|---|---|
| 1 | Mihai Țiu (ROU) | 5 | 1 | 29 | 16 | Q | | 5–2 | 4–5 | 5–3 | 5–3 | 5–1 | 5–2 |
| 2 | Enrique Salvat (CUB) | 5 | 1 | 27 | 15 | Q | 2–5 | | 5–2 | 5–2 | 5–3 | 5–1 | 5–2 |
| 3 | Bernard Talvard (FRA) | 4 | 2 | 24 | 16 | Q | 5–4 | 2–5 | | 2–5 | 5–2 | 5–0 | 5–0 |
| 4 | Barry Paul (GBR) | 4 | 2 | 25 | 22 | Q | 3–5 | 2–5 | 5–2 | | 5–4 | 5–4 | 5–2 |
| 5 | Ernest Simon (AUS) | 2 | 4 | 22 | 20 | | 3–5 | 3–5 | 2–5 | 4–5 | | 5–0 | 5–0 |
| 6 | Ng Wing Biu (HKG) | 1 | 5 | 11 | 26 | | 1–5 | 1–5 | 0–5 | 4–5 | 0–5 | | 5–1 |
| 7 | Abdul Nasser Al-Sayegh (KUW) | 0 | 6 | 7 | 30 | | 2–5 | 2–5 | 0–5 | 2–5 | 0–5 | 1–5 | |

Source: Official Report, vol. 3, p. 223

==== Round 1 Pool C ====
| Pos | Fencer | W | L | TF | TA | Qual. | VD | NS | MD | ML | JK | JS |
|---|---|---|---|---|---|---|---|---|---|---|---|---|
| 1 | Vladimir Denisov (URS) | 5 | 0 | 25 | 11 | Q | | 5–3 | 5–4 | 5–1 | 5–1 | 5–2 |
| 2 | Noriyuki Sato (JPN) | 3 | 2 | 18 | 18 | Q | 3–5 | | 5–3 | 0–5 | 5–1 | 5–4 |
| 3 | Marek Dąbrowski (POL) | 2 | 3 | 19 | 19 | Q | 4–5 | 3–5 | | 5–3 | 2–5 | 5–1 |
| 4 | Martin Lang (USA) | 2 | 3 | 17 | 19 | Q | 1–5 | 5–0 | 3–5 | | 3–5 | 5–4 |
| 5 | Jenő Kamuti (HUN) | 2 | 3 | 15 | 20 | | 1–5 | 1–5 | 5–2 | 5–3 | | 3–5 |
| 6 | José Samalot (PUR) | 1 | 4 | 16 | 23 | | 2–5 | 4–5 | 1–5 | 4–5 | 5–3 | |

Source: Official Report, vol. 3, p. 223

==== Round 1 Pool D ====
| Pos | Fencer | W | L | TF | TA | Qual. | VS | HH | ED | FDZ | FL | CM |
|---|---|---|---|---|---|---|---|---|---|---|---|---|
| 1 | Vasyl Stankovych (URS) | 4 | 1 | 24 | 14 | Q | | 4–5 | 5–1 | 5–4 | 5–2 | 5–2 |
| 2 | Harald Hein (FRG) | 4 | 1 | 24 | 18 | Q | 5–4 | | 4–5 | 5–4 | 5–1 | 5–4 |
| 3 | Edward Donofrio (USA) | 4 | 1 | 21 | 18 | Q | 1–5 | 5–4 | | 5–4 | 5–4 | 5–1 |
| 4 | Fabio Dal Zotto (ITA) | 2 | 3 | 22 | 22 | Q | 4–5 | 4–5 | 4–5 | | 5–4 | 5–3 |
| 5 | Fernando Lupiz (ARG) | 1 | 4 | 16 | 24 | | 2–5 | 1–5 | 4–5 | 4–5 | | 5–4 |
| 6 | Chan Matthew (HKG) | 0 | 5 | 14 | 25 | | 2–5 | 4–5 | 1–5 | 3–5 | 4–5 | |

Source: Official Report, vol. 3, p. 223

==== Round 1 Pool E ====
| Pos | Fencer | W | L | TF | TA | Qual. | FP | CM | JK | RB | MD | JA |
|---|---|---|---|---|---|---|---|---|---|---|---|---|
| 1 | Frédéric Pietruszka (FRA) | 4 | 1 | 24 | 13 | Q | | 5–4 | 5–3 | 4–5 | 5–1 | 5–0 |
| 2 | Carlo Montano (ITA) | 3 | 2 | 23 | 14 | Q | 4–5 | | 5–3 | 4–5 | 5–0 | 5–1 |
| 3 | József Komatits (HUN) | 3 | 2 | 21 | 13 | Q | 3–5 | 3–5 | | 5–2 | 5–1 | 5–0 |
| 4 | Rob Bruniges (GBR) | 3 | 2 | 21 | 19 | Q | 5–4 | 5–4 | 2–5 | | 4–5 | 5–1 |
| 5 | Michel Dessureault (CAN) | 2 | 3 | 12 | 21 | | 1–5 | 0–5 | 1–5 | 5–4 | | 5–2 |
| 6 | Jamal Ameen (KUW) | 0 | 5 | 4 | 25 | | 0–5 | 1–5 | 0–5 | 1–5 | 2–5 | |

Source: Official Report, vol. 3, p. 223

==== Round 1 Pool F ====
| Pos | Fencer | W | L | TF | TA | Qual. | LS | FK | PG | GP | TS | GM |
|---|---|---|---|---|---|---|---|---|---|---|---|---|
| 1 | Lajos Somodi Jr. (HUN) | 5 | 0 | 25 | 13 | Q | | 5–3 | 5–3 | 5–4 | 5–1 | 5–2 |
| 2 | František Koukal (TCH) | 4 | 1 | 23 | 14 | Q | 3–5 | | 5–3 | 5–4 | 5–1 | 5–1 |
| 3 | Patrice Gaille (SUI) | 3 | 2 | 21 | 16 | Q | 3–5 | 3–5 | | 5–1 | 5–2 | 5–3 |
| 4 | Graham Paul (GBR) | 2 | 3 | 19 | 16 | Q | 4–5 | 4–5 | 1–5 | | 5–1 | 5–0 |
| 5 | Thierry Soumagne (BEL) | 1 | 4 | 10 | 20 | | 1–5 | 1–5 | 2–5 | 1–5 | | 5–0 |
| 6 | Göran Malkar (SWE) | 0 | 5 | 6 | 25 | | 2–5 | 1–5 | 3–5 | 0–5 | 0–5 | |

Source: Official Report, vol. 3, p. 223

==== Round 1 Pool G ====
| Pos | Fencer | W | L | TF | TA | Qual. | AR | ZW | TJ | HN | TP | LF |
|---|---|---|---|---|---|---|---|---|---|---|---|---|
| 1 | Aleksandr Romankov (URS) | 4 | 1 | 23 | 10 | Q | | 5–1 | 5–2 | 5–0 | 3–5 | 5–2 |
| 2 | Ziemowit Wojciechowski (POL) | 4 | 1 | 21 | 10 | Q | 1–5 | | 5–2 | 5–1 | 5–1 | 5–1 |
| 3 | Toshio Jingu (JPN) | 3 | 2 | 19 | 13 | Q | 2–5 | 2–5 | | 5–0 | 5–2 | 5–1 |
| 4 | Hossein Niknam (IRI) | 2 | 3 | 11 | 22 | Q | 0–5 | 1–5 | 0–5 | | 5–3 | 5–4 |
| 5 | Tudor Petruș (ROU) | 1 | 4 | 14 | 23 | | 5–3 | 1–5 | 2–5 | 3–5 | | 3–5 |
| 6 | Lehel Fekete (CAN) | 1 | 4 | 13 | 23 | | 2–5 | 1–5 | 1–5 | 4–5 | 5–3 | |

Source: Official Report, vol. 3, p. 223

==== Round 1 Pool H ====
| Pos | Fencer | W | L | TF | TA | Qual. | MK | JJ | MB | EB | AA | OV |
|---|---|---|---|---|---|---|---|---|---|---|---|---|
| 1 | Masanori Kawatsu (JPN) | 4 | 1 | 23 | 11 | Q | | 5–2 | 3–5 | 5–3 | 5–0 | 5–1 |
| 2 | Jaroslav Jurka (TCH) | 3 | 2 | 21 | 17 | Q | 2–5 | | 4–5 | 5–4 | 5–3 | 5–0 |
| 3 | Matthias Behr (FRG) | 3 | 2 | 20 | 18 | Q | 5–3 | 5–4 | | 3–5 | 2–5 | 5–1 |
| 4 | Ed Ballinger (USA) | 3 | 2 | 22 | 20 | Q | 3–5 | 4–5 | 5–3 | | 5–4 | 5–3 |
| 5 | Ahmed Akbari (IRI) | 2 | 3 | 17 | 21 | | 0–5 | 3–5 | 5–2 | 4–5 | | 5–4 |
| 6 | Omar Vergara (ARG) | 0 | 5 | 9 | 25 | | 1–5 | 0–5 | 1–5 | 3–5 | 4–5 | |

Source: Official Report, vol. 3, p. 223

==== Round 1 Pool I ====
| Pos | Fencer | W | L | TF | TA | Qual. | KR | PK | LK | EJ | AAPA | DF |
|---|---|---|---|---|---|---|---|---|---|---|---|---|
| 1 | Klaus Reichert (FRG) | 4 | 1 | 22 | 11 | Q | | 5–3 | 2–5 | 5–3 | 5–0 | 5–0 |
| 2 | Petru Kuki (ROU) | 4 | 1 | 23 | 15 | Q | 3–5 | | 5–2 | 5–3 | 5–3 | 5–2 |
| 3 | Lech Koziejowski (POL) | 3 | 2 | 21 | 17 | Q | 5–2 | 2–5 | | 5–4 | 4–5 | 5–1 |
| 4 | Eduardo Jhons (CUB) | 2 | 3 | 20 | 20 | Q | 3–5 | 3–5 | 4–5 | | 5–4 | 5–1 |
| 5 | Ali Asghar Pashapour-Alamdari (IRI) | 2 | 3 | 17 | 21 | | 0–5 | 3–5 | 5–4 | 4–5 | | 5–2 |
| 6 | Daniel Feraud (ARG) | 0 | 5 | 6 | 25 | | 0–5 | 2–5 | 1–5 | 1–5 | 2–5 | |

Source: Official Report, vol. 3, p. 223

=== Round 2 ===
==== Round 2 Pool A ====
| Pos | Fencer | W | L | TF | TA | Qual. | CN | VS | PK | LK | JJ | HN |
|---|---|---|---|---|---|---|---|---|---|---|---|---|
| 1 | Christian Noël (FRA) | 4 | 1 | 23 | 14 | Q | | 3–5 | 5–1 | 5–3 | 5–2 | 5–3 |
| 2 | Vasyl Stankovych (URS) | 3 | 2 | 23 | 18 | Q | 5–3 | | 5–2 | 4–5 | 5–3 | 4–5 |
| 3 | Petru Kuki (ROU) | 3 | 2 | 18 | 18 | Q | 1–5 | 2–5 | | 5–1 | 5–4 | 5–3 |
| 4 | Lech Koziejowski (POL) | 2 | 3 | 18 | 20 | Q | 3–5 | 5–4 | 1–5 | | 4–5 | 5–1 |
| 5 | Jaroslav Jurka (TCH) | 2 | 3 | 19 | 21 | | 2–5 | 3–5 | 4–5 | 5–4 | | 5–2 |
| 6 | Hossein Niknam (IRI) | 1 | 4 | 14 | 24 | | 3–5 | 5–4 | 3–5 | 1–5 | 2–5 | |

Source: Official Report, vol. 3, p. 225

==== Round 2 Pool B ====
| Pos | Fencer | W | L | TF | TA | Qual. | FK | VD | RB | HH | PG | ML |
|---|---|---|---|---|---|---|---|---|---|---|---|---|
| 1 | František Koukal (TCH) | 5 | 0 | 25 | 14 | Q | | 5–2 | 5–3 | 5–4 | 5–2 | 5–3 |
| 2 | Vladimir Denisov (URS) | 4 | 1 | 22 | 16 | Q | 2–5 | | 5–4 | 5–4 | 5–1 | 5–2 |
| 3 | Rob Bruniges (GBR) | 2 | 3 | 21 | 19 | Q | 3–5 | 4–5 | | 5–2 | 4–5 | 5–2 |
| 4 | Harald Hein (FRG) | 2 | 3 | 20 | 22 | Q | 4–5 | 4–5 | 2–5 | | 5–4 | 5–3 |
| 5 | Patrice Gaille (SUI) | 2 | 3 | 17 | 20 | | 2–5 | 1–5 | 5–4 | 4–5 | | 5–1 |
| 6 | Martin Lang (USA) | 0 | 5 | 11 | 25 | | 3–5 | 2–5 | 2–5 | 3–5 | 1–5 | |

Source: Official Report, vol. 3, p. 225

==== Round 2 Pool C ====
| Pos | Fencer | W | L | TF | TA | Qual. | FP | FDZ | MB | ED | LS | TJ |
|---|---|---|---|---|---|---|---|---|---|---|---|---|
| 1 | Frédéric Pietruszka (FRA) | 4 | 1 | 23 | 12 | Q | | 3–5 | 5–4 | 5–1 | 5–1 | 5–1 |
| 2 | Fabio Dal Zotto (ITA) | 4 | 1 | 23 | 14 | Q | 5–3 | | 3–5 | 5–4 | 5–1 | 5–1 |
| 3 | Matthias Behr (FRG) | 3 | 2 | 22 | 17 | Q | 4–5 | 5–3 | | 3–5 | 5–3 | 5–1 |
| 4 | Edward Donofrio (USA) | 3 | 2 | 20 | 18 | Q | 1–5 | 4–5 | 5–3 | | 5–4 | 5–1 |
| 5 | Lajos Somodi Jr. (HUN) | 1 | 4 | 14 | 23 | | 1–5 | 1–5 | 3–5 | 4–5 | | 5–3 |
| 6 | Toshio Jingu (JPN) | 0 | 5 | 7 | 25 | | 1–5 | 1–5 | 1–5 | 1–5 | 3–5 | |

Source: Official Report, vol. 3, p. 225

==== Round 2 Pool D ====
| Pos | Fencer | W | L | TF | TA | Qual. | KR | KH | EB | JK | MT | EJ |
|---|---|---|---|---|---|---|---|---|---|---|---|---|
| 1 | Klaus Reichert (FRG) | 4 | 1 | 24 | 18 | Q | | 5–4 | 4–5 | 5–4 | 5–1 | 5–4 |
| 2 | Klaus Haertter (GDR) | 3 | 2 | 23 | 18 | Q | 4–5 | | 5–1 | 4–5 | 5–3 | 5–4 |
| 3 | Ed Ballinger (USA) | 3 | 2 | 20 | 20 | Q | 5–4 | 1–5 | | 4–5 | 5–4 | 5–2 |
| 4 | József Komatits (HUN) | 3 | 2 | 19 | 22 | Q | 4–5 | 5–4 | 5–4 | | 0–5 | 5–4 |
| 5 | Mihai Țiu (ROU) | 2 | 3 | 18 | 15 | | 1–5 | 3–5 | 4–5 | 5–0 | | 5–0 |
| 6 | Eduardo Jhons (CUB) | 0 | 5 | 14 | 25 | | 4–5 | 4–5 | 2–5 | 4–5 | 0–5 | |

Source: Official Report, vol. 3, p. 225

==== Round 2 Pool E ====
| Pos | Fencer | W | L | TF | TA | Qual. | BT | ZW | ES | GP | CM | NS |
|---|---|---|---|---|---|---|---|---|---|---|---|---|
| 1 | Bernard Talvard (FRA) | 4 | 1 | 22 | 15 | Q | | 2–5 | 5–1 | 5–4 | 5–2 | 5–3 |
| 2 | Ziemowit Wojciechowski (POL) | 3 | 2 | 21 | 20 | Q | 5–2 | | 2–5 | 5–4 | 4–5 | 5–4 |
| 3 | Enrique Salvat (CUB) | 3 | 2 | 16 | 18 | Q | 1–5 | 5–2 | | 5–3 | 0–5 | 5–3 |
| 4 | Graham Paul (GBR) | 2 | 3 | 21 | 20 | Q | 4–5 | 4–5 | 3–5 | | 5–1 | 5–4 |
| 5 | Carlo Montano (ITA) | 2 | 3 | 17 | 19 | | 2–5 | 5–4 | 5–0 | 1–5 | | 4–5 |
| 6 | Noriyuki Sato (JPN) | 1 | 4 | 19 | 24 | | 3–5 | 4–5 | 3–5 | 4–5 | 5–4 | |

Source: Official Report, vol. 3, p. 225

==== Round 2 Pool F ====
| Pos | Fencer | W | L | TF | TA | Qual. | AR | GB | JG | MD | MK | BP |
|---|---|---|---|---|---|---|---|---|---|---|---|---|
| 1 | Aleksandr Romankov (URS) | 4 | 1 | 22 | 13 | Q | | 5–4 | 2–5 | 5–1 | 5–1 | 5–2 |
| 2 | Greg Benko (AUS) | 3 | 2 | 21 | 15 | Q | 4–5 | | 5–1 | 5–3 | 5–1 | 2–5 |
| 3 | Jorge Garbey (CUB) | 3 | 2 | 20 | 18 | Q | 5–2 | 1–5 | | 4–5 | 5–4 | 5–2 |
| 4 | Marek Dąbrowski (POL) | 2 | 3 | 18 | 22 | Q | 1–5 | 3–5 | 5–4 | | 4–5 | 5–3 |
| 5 | Masanori Kawatsu (JPN) | 2 | 3 | 16 | 23 | | 1–5 | 1–5 | 4–5 | 5–4 | | 5–4 |
| 6 | Barry Paul (GBR) | 1 | 4 | 16 | 22 | | 2–5 | 5–2 | 2–5 | 3–5 | 4–5 | |

Source: Official Report, vol. 3, p. 225

=== Round 3 ===
==== Round 3 Pool A ====
| Pos | Fencer | W | L | TF | TA | Qual. | KR | PK | GB | MD | EB | FK |
|---|---|---|---|---|---|---|---|---|---|---|---|---|
| 1 | Klaus Reichert (FRG) | 4 | 1 | 24 | 9 | Q | | 4–5 | 5–1 | 5–1 | 5–0 | 5–2 |
| 2 | Petru Kuki (ROU) | 4 | 1 | 22 | 19 | Q | 5–4 | | 5–2 | 5–4 | 2–5 | 5–4 |
| 3 | Greg Benko (AUS) | 2 | 3 | 17 | 19 | Q | 1–5 | 2–5 | | 4–5 | 5–1 | 5–3 |
| 4 | Marek Dąbrowski (POL) | 2 | 3 | 19 | 22 | Q | 1–5 | 4–5 | 5–4 | | 4–5 | 5–3 |
| 5 | Ed Ballinger (USA) | 2 | 3 | 14 | 21 | | 0–5 | 5–2 | 1–5 | 5–4 | | 3–5 |
| 6 | František Koukal (TCH) | 1 | 4 | 17 | 23 | | 2–5 | 4–5 | 3–5 | 3–5 | 5–3 | |

Source: Official Report, vol. 3, p. 227

==== Round 3 Pool B ====
| Pos | Fencer | W | L | TF | TA | Qual. | VD | HH | FP | MB | ES | ZW |
|---|---|---|---|---|---|---|---|---|---|---|---|---|
| 1 | Vladimir Denisov (URS) | 4 | 1 | 23 | 13 | Q | | 5–1 | 3–5 | 5–4 | 5–1 | 5–2 |
| 2 | Harald Hein (FRG) | 4 | 1 | 21 | 18 | Q | 1–5 | | 5–3 | 5–4 | 5–2 | 5–4 |
| 3 | Frédéric Pietruszka (FRA) | 3 | 2 | 20 | 16 | Q | 5–3 | 3–5 | | 2–5 | 5–1 | 5–2 |
| 4 | Matthias Behr (FRG) | 2 | 3 | 21 | 19 | Q | 4–5 | 4–5 | 5–2 | | 3–5 | 5–2 |
| 5 | Enrique Salvat (CUB) | 2 | 3 | 14 | 21 | | 1–5 | 2–5 | 1–5 | 5–3 | | 5–3 |
| 6 | Ziemowit Wojciechowski (POL) | 0 | 5 | 13 | 25 | | 2–5 | 4–5 | 2–5 | 2–5 | 3–5 | |

Source: Official Report, vol. 3, p. 227

==== Round 3 Pool C ====
| Pos | Fencer | W | L | TF | TA | Qual. | AR | KH | JK | BT | GP | JG |
|---|---|---|---|---|---|---|---|---|---|---|---|---|
| 1 | Aleksandr Romankov (URS) | 5 | 0 | 25 | 15 | Q | | 5–2 | 5–3 | 5–4 | 5–2 | 5–4 |
| 2 | Klaus Haertter (GDR) | 3 | 2 | 21 | 16 | Q | 2–5 | | 4–5 | 5–3 | 5–1 | 5–2 |
| 3 | József Komatits (HUN) | 3 | 2 | 21 | 20 | Q | 3–5 | 5–4 | | 5–4 | 3–5 | 5–2 |
| 4 | Bernard Talvard (FRA) | 2 | 3 | 21 | 19 | Q | 4–5 | 3–5 | 4–5 | | 5–2 | 5–2 |
| 5 | Graham Paul (GBR) | 1 | 4 | 14 | 23 | | 2–5 | 1–5 | 5–3 | 2–5 | | 4–5 |
| 6 | Jorge Garbey (CUB) | 1 | 4 | 15 | 24 | | 4–5 | 2–5 | 2–5 | 2–5 | 5–4 | |

Source: Official Report, vol. 3, p. 227

==== Round 3 Pool D ====
| Pos | Fencer | W | L | TF | TA | Qual. | CN | FDZ | VS | ED | LK | RB |
|---|---|---|---|---|---|---|---|---|---|---|---|---|
| 1 | Christian Noël (FRA) | 5 | 0 | 25 | 13 | Q | | 5–4 | 5–2 | 5–2 | 5–3 | 5–2 |
| 2 | Fabio Dal Zotto (ITA) | 4 | 1 | 24 | 11 | Q | 4–5 | | 5–3 | 5–2 | 5–0 | 5–1 |
| 3 | Vasyl Stankovych (URS) | 3 | 2 | 20 | 18 | Q | 2–5 | 3–5 | | 5–4 | 5–3 | 5–1 |
| 4 | Edward Donofrio (USA) | 1 | 4 | 17 | 23 | Q | 2–5 | 2–5 | 4–5 | | 5–3 | 4–5 |
| 5 | Lech Koziejowski (POL) | 1 | 4 | 14 | 23 | | 3–5 | 0–5 | 3–5 | 3–5 | | 5–3 |
| 6 | Rob Bruniges (GBR) | 1 | 4 | 12 | 24 | | 2–5 | 1–5 | 1–5 | 5–4 | 3–5 | |

Source: Official Report, vol. 3, p. 227

=== Double elimination rounds ===
==== Winners brackets ====
===== Winners group 1 =====
| Round of 16 | | Round of 8 |
| Christian Noël (FRA) | 8 |
| Marek Dąbrowski (POL) | 10 | Marek Dąbrowski (POL) | 3 |
| Vasyl Stankovych (URS) | 10 | Vasyl Stankovych (URS) | 10 |
| Klaus Haertter (GDR) | 2 |

===== Winners group 2 =====
| Round of 16 | | Round of 8 |
| Vladimir Denisov (URS) | 10 |
| József Komatits (HUN) | 6 | Vladimir Denisov (URS) | 9 |
| Greg Benko (AUS) | 10 | Greg Benko (AUS) | 10 |
| Klaus Reichert (FRG) | 9 |

===== Winners group 3 =====
| Round of 16 | | Round of 8 |
| Fabio Dal Zotto (ITA) | 10 |
| Edward Donofrio (USA) | 4 | Fabio Dal Zotto (ITA) | 10 |
| Harald Hein (FRG) | 10 | Harald Hein (FRG) | 9 |
| Frédéric Pietruszka (FRA) | 9 |

===== Winners group 4 =====
| Round of 16 | | Round of 8 |
| Petru Kuki (ROU) | 5 |
| Bernard Talvard (FRA) | 10 | Bernard Talvard (FRA) | 10 |
| Matthias Behr (FRG) | 5 | Aleksandr Romankov (URS) | 3 |
| Aleksandr Romankov (URS) | 10 |

==== Losers brackets ====
===== Losers group 1 =====
Round of 4
Christian Noël (FRA) | 10
Klaus Haertter (GDR) | 7
József Komatits (HUN) | 10
Klaus Reichert (FRG) | 5

Round of 4
Christian Noël (FRA) | 10
Marek Dąbrowski (POL) | 5
József Komatits (HUN) | 3
Aleksandr Romankov (URS) | 10

Round of 2
Christian Noël (FRA) | 6
Aleksandr Romankov (URS) | 10

===== Losers group 2 =====
Round of 4
Edward Donofrio (USA) | 5
Frédéric Pietruszka (FRA) | 10
Petru Kuki (ROU) | 10
Matthias Behr (FRG) | 9

Round of 4
Frédéric Pietruszka (FRA) | 10
Harald Hein (FRG) | 6
Petru Kuki (ROU) | 8
Vladimir Denisov (URS) | 10

Round of 2
Frédéric Pietruszka (FRA) | 10
Vladimir Denisov (URS) | 1

=== Final round ===
Dal Zotto and Romankov each finished with 4 wins and 1 loss in the pool (with Romankov's loss being to Dal Zotto; Dal Zotto had been beaten by Talvard). They faced off again in the barrage to determine the gold and silver medals; Dal Zotto again defeated Romankov, 5–1.

| Pos | Fencer | W | L | TF | TA | Qual. | FDZ | AR | BT | VS | FP | GB |
|---|---|---|---|---|---|---|---|---|---|---|---|---|
| 1 | Fabio Dal Zotto (ITA) | 4 | 1 | 24 | 15 | B | | 5–1 | 4–5 | 5–4 | 5–1 | 5–4 |
| 1 | Aleksandr Romankov (URS) | 4 | 1 | 21 | 13 | B | 1–5 | | 5–2 | 5–1 | 5–1 | 5–4 |
| 3rd place, bronze medalist(s) | Bernard Talvard (FRA) | 3 | 2 | 19 | 21 | | 5–4 | 2–5 | | 5–4 | 2–5 | 5–3 |
| 4 | Vasyl Stankovych (URS) | 2 | 3 | 19 | 18 | | 4–5 | 1–5 | 4–5 | | 5–1 | 5–2 |
| 5 | Frédéric Pietruszka (FRA) | 2 | 3 | 13 | 19 | | 1–5 | 1–5 | 5–2 | 1–5 | | 5–2 |
| 6 | Greg Benko (AUS) | 0 | 5 | 15 | 25 | | 4–5 | 4–5 | 3–5 | 2–5 | 2–5 | |

Source: Official Report, vol. 3, p. 228

Barrage

| Pos | Fencer | W | L | TF | TA | FDZ | AR |
|---|---|---|---|---|---|---|---|
| 1st place, gold medalist(s) | Fabio Dal Zotto (ITA) | 1 | 0 | 5 | 1 | | 5–1 |
| 2nd place, silver medalist(s) | Aleksandr Romankov (URS) | 0 | 1 | 1 | 5 | 1–5 | |

Source: Official Report, vol. 3, p. 228

== Final classification ==
| Fencer | Country |
|---|---|
| Fabio Dal Zotto | Italy |
| Aleksandr Romankov | Soviet Union |
| Bernard Talvard | France |
| Vasyl Stankovych | Soviet Union |
| Frédéric Pietruszka | France |
| Greg Benko | Australia |
| Vladimir Denisov | Soviet Union |
| Christian Noël | France |
| József Komatits | Hungary |
| Petru Kuki | Romania |
| Harald Hein | West Germany |
| Marek Dąbrowski | Poland |
| Matthias Behr | West Germany |
| Klaus Haertter | East Germany |
| Klaus Reichert | West Germany |
| Edward Donofrio | United States |
| Enrique Salvat | Cuba |
| Ed Ballinger | United States |
| František Koukal | Czechoslovakia |
| Graham Paul | Great Britain |
| Lech Koziejowski | Poland |
| Jorge Garbey | Cuba |
| Rob Bruniges | Great Britain |
| Ziemowit Wojciechowski | Poland |
| Mihai Țiu | Romania |
| Carlo Montano | Italy |
| Jaroslav Jurka | Czechoslovakia |
| Patrice Gaille | Switzerland |
| Masanori Kawatsu | Japan |
| Noriyuki Sato | Japan |
| Barry Paul | Great Britain |
| Lajos Somodi Jr. | Hungary |
| Hossein Niknam | Iran |
| Eduardo Jhons | Cuba |
| Martin Lang | United States |
| Toshio Jingu | Japan |
| Stefano Simoncelli | Italy |
| Ahmed Akbari | Iran |
| Ali Asghar Pashapour-Alamdari | Iran |
| Jenő Kamuti | Hungary |
| Michel Dessureault | Canada |
| Ernest Simon | Australia |
| José Samalot | Puerto Rico |
| Fernando Lupiz | Argentina |
| Tudor Petruș | Romania |
| Thierry Soumagne | Belgium |
| Lehel Fekete | Canada |
| Ng Wing Biu | Hong Kong |
| Kam Roger | Hong Kong |
| Chan Matthew | Hong Kong |
| Omar Vergara | Argentina |
| Daniel Feraud | Argentina |
| Göran Malkar | Sweden |
| Jamal Ameen | Kuwait |
| Abdul Nasser Al-Sayegh | Kuwait |
| Ahmed Al-Arbeed | Kuwait |
