= Fencing at the 1972 Summer Olympics – Men's foil =

Fencing at the Olympics

Men's foil at the Games of the XX Olympiad
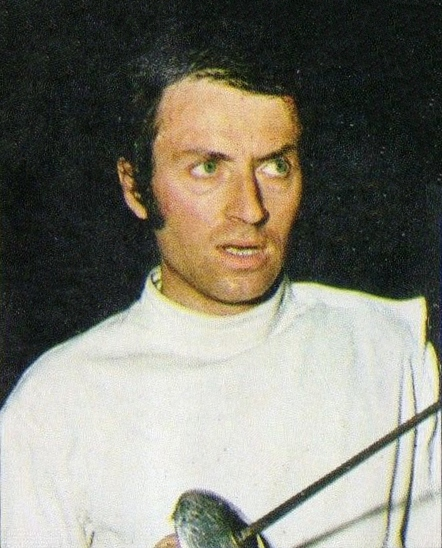
- Witold Woyda (1974)
- Venue: Exhibition Halls 12 & 20
- Dates: 29–30 August 1972
- Competitors: 57 from 25 nations

Medalists
1st place, gold medalist(s)		Witold Woyda	Poland
2nd place, silver medalist(s)		Jenő Kamuti	Hungary
3rd place, bronze medalist(s)		Christian Noël	France

The men's foil was one of eight fencing events on the fencing at the 1972 Summer Olympics programme. It was the sixteenth appearance of the event. The competition was held from 29 to 30 August 1972. 57 fencers from 25 nations competed. Nations had been limited to three fencers each since 1928. The event was won by Witold Woyda of Poland, the nation's second victory in the men's foil in three Games. Jenő Kamuti of Hungary repeated as the silver medalist, the seventh man to win multiple medals in the event. France took bronze for the third consecutive Games, this time with Christian Noël earning the honor.

== Background ==
This was the 16th appearance of the event, which has been held at every Summer Olympics except 1908 (when there was a foil display only rather than a medal event). Four of the six finalists from 1968 returned: silver medalist (and 1964 fifth-place finisher) Jenő Kamuti of Hungary, two-time bronze medalist Daniel Revenu of France, fourth-place finisher Christian Noël of France, and sixth-place finisher Mihai Țiu of Romania. Vasyl Stankovych of the Soviet Union was the reigning world champion; Friedrich Wessel of West Germany had won the previous two. Another significant contender was Witold Woyda, who had ten world championship and Olympic medals for the Polish foil team (and an individual silver at the 1962 world championship).

Hong Kong and Israel each made their debut in the men's foil. The United States made its 15th appearance, most of any nation, having missed only the inaugural 1896 competition.

== Competition format ==
After two Games of hybrid pool/knockout play, the 1972 tournament returned to an all-pool format, with each fencer facing the other fencers in the pool in a round robin. Bouts were to 5 touches. There were no barrages; ties were broken by touch quotient: touches scored divided by touches received. Unlike previous Games, all bouts were finished in the round robins. The 1972 format also eliminated the 8-fencer final pools of previous Games; for all rounds after the first, the number of fencers was set at 6.

There were five rounds:

- Round 1 (or "eliminating round"): The 57 fencers were divided into 9 pools, mostly of 6 fencers each but some with 7. The top 4 fencers in each pool advanced; this narrowed the field from 57 to 36.
- Round 2 (or "1/8 finals"): The 36 fencers were divided into 6 pools of 6 fencers each. The top 4 fencers in each pool advanced, cutting the field from 36 to 24.
- Quarterfinals: With 24 fencers remaining, there were 4 pools of 6 fencers each. Now, only the top 3 in each pool advanced. This split the field in half, from 24 to 12.
- Semifinals: There were 2 pools of 6 fencers each. Again, only the top 3 advanced, resulting in a final pool of 6.
- Final: The final pool featured the remaining 6 fencers.

== Schedule ==
All times are Central European Time (UTC+1)

Date	Time	Round
Wednesday, 29 August 1972	8:00; 14:00	Round 1 Round 2 Quarterfinals
Thursday, 30 August 1972	15:30; 19:39	Semifinals; Final

== Results ==
=== Round 1 ===
==== Round 1 Pool A ====
Pos	Fencer	W	L	TF	TA	Qual.	FW	JK	VS	CC	AAP	CM
1	Friedrich Wessel (FRG)	5	0	25	12	Q		5–2	5–4	5–3	5–1	5–2
2	Jenő Kamuti (HUN)	4	1	22	12	Q	2–5		5–1	5–2	5–2	5–2
3	Vasyl Stankovych (URS)	3	2	20	13	Q	4–5	1–5		5–0	5–1	5–2
4	Carlos Calderón (MEX)	2	3	15	17	Q	3–5	2–5	0–5		5–2	5–0
5	Ali Asghar Pashapour (IRI)	1	4	11	23		1–5	2–5	1–5	2–5		5–3
6	Chan Matthew (HKG)	0	5	9	25		2–5	2–5	2–5	0–5	3–5	

Source: Official Report, vol. 3, p. 247

==== Round 1 Pool B ====
Pos	Fencer	W	L	TF	TA	Qual.	GP	VD	MD	YW	SS	JN
1	Graham Paul (GBR)	5	0	23	13	Q		5–3	5–1	3–5	5–1	5–3
2	Vladimir Denisov (URS)	4	1	23	21	Q	3–5		5–4	5–4	5–4	5–4
3	Marek Dąbrowski (POL)	3	2	20	18	Q	1–5	4–5		5–3	5–2	5–3
4	Yehuda Weisenstein (ISR)	2	3	19	20	Q	5–3	4–5	3–5		2–5	5–2
5	Stefano Simoncelli (ITA)	1	4	17	18		1–5	4–5	2–5	5–2		5–1
6	John Nonna (USA)	0	5	13	25		3–5	4–5	3–5	2–5	1–5	

Source: Official Report, vol. 3, p. 247

==== Round 1 Pool C ====
Pos	Fencer	W	L	TF	TA	Qual.	KU	LK	GS	TM	HH	AV	AS
1	Kiyoshi Uehara (JPN)	6	0	30	10	Q		5–2	5–1	5–3	5–1	5–3	5–0
2	László Kamuti (HUN)	4	2	25	16	Q	2–5		5–2	5–2	3–5	5–0	5–2
3	Guillermo Saucedo (ARG)	4	2	23	20	Q	1–5	2–5		5–2	5–1	5–3	5–2
4	Tănase Mureșanu (ROU)	3	3	24	24	Q	3–5	2–5	4–5		5–4	5–4	5–1
5	Harald Hein (FRG)	2	4	20	25		1–5	5–3	1–5	4–5		4–5	5–2
6	Andreas Vgenopoulos (GRE)	2	4	20	28		3–5	0–5	3–5	4–5	5–4		5–4
7	Ali Sleiman (LIB)	0	6	11	30		0–5	2–5	2–5	1–5	2–5	4–5	

Source: Official Report, vol. 3, p. 247

==== Round 1 Pool D ====
Pos	Fencer	W	L	TF	TA	Qual.	BT	KR	EJ	DA	AP	JBH
1	Bernard Talvard (FRA)	4	1	22	9	Q		2–5	5–3	5–0	5–1	5–0
2	Klaus Reichert (FRG)	3	2	20	14	Q	5–2		2–5	3–5	5–2	5–0
3	Eduardo Jhons (CUB)	3	2	21	15	Q	3–5	5–2		5–3	3–5	5–0
4	Dan Alon (ISR)	3	2	18	17	Q	0–5	5–3	3–5		5–3	5–1
5	Arcangelo Pinelli (ITA)	2	3	16	22		1–5	2–5	5–3	3–5		5–4
6	John Bouchier-Hayes (IRL)	0	5	5	25		0–5	0–5	0–5	1–5	4–5	

Source: Official Report, vol. 3, p. 247

==== Round 1 Pool E ====
The four-way tie for 3rd place was broken by touch quotient (touches scored divided by touches received). Benko was highest at 0.950, then Losert at 0.944; those two qualified for the next round at 3rd and 4th place. Salvat (0.933) and Darricau (0.714) were eliminated.

Pos	Fencer	W	L	TF	TA	Qual.	WW	SH	GB	RL	ES	YDD
1	Witold Woyda (POL)	4	1	20	16	Q		5–4	5–4	0–5	5–1	5–2
2	Ștefan Haukler (ROU)	3	2	22	17	Q	4–5		5–2	3–5	5–2	5–3
3	Greg Benko (AUS)	2	3	19	20	Q	4–5	2–5		5–4	5–1	3–5
4	Roland Losert (AUT)	2	3	17	18	Q	5–0	5–3	4–5		0–5	3–5
5	Enrique Salvat (CUB)	2	3	14	15		1–5	2–5	1–5	5–0		5–0
6	Yves Daniel Darricau (LIB)	2	3	15	21		2–5	3–5	5–3	5–3	0–5	

Source: Official Report, vol. 3, p. 248

==== Round 1 Pool F ====
The three-way tie for third place was broken by touch quotient (touches for divided by touches against). Paul (1.250) and Simon (1.182) each scored more touches than they received, while Lupiz (0.917) was hit more often than he connected. The former two advanced.

Pos	Fencer	W	L	TF	TA	Qual.	LK	SS	BP	ES	FL	FM	RE
1	Lech Koziejowski (POL)	6	0	30	9	Q		5–2	5–2	5–3	5–1	5–1	5–0
2	Sándor Szabó (HUN)	4	2	25	20	Q	2–5		5–4	5–4	3–5	5–0	5–2
3	Barry Paul (GBR)	3	3	25	20	Q	2–5	4–5		4–5	5–4	5–1	5–0
4	Ernest Simon (AUS)	3	3	26	22	Q	3–5	4–5	5–4		4–5	5–2	5–1
5	Fernando Lupiz (ARG)	3	3	22	24		1–5	5–3	4–5	5–4		2–5	5–2
6	Fawzi Merhi (LIB)	2	4	14	25		1–5	0–5	1–5	2–5	5–2		5–3
7	Robert Elliott (HKG)	0	6	8	30		0–5	2–5	0–5	1–5	2–5	3–5	

Source: Official Report, vol. 3, p. 248

==== Round 1 Pool G ====
Pos	Fencer	W	L	TF	TA	Qual.	DR	JF	AK	MB	VC	BE	LW
1	Daniel Revenu (FRA)	6	0	30	5	Q		5–2	5–0	5–0	5–3	5–0	5–0
2	Joseph Freeman (USA)	5	1	27	15	Q	2–5		5–3	5–2	5–1	5–1	5–3
3	Anatoly Koteshev (URS)	4	2	23	19	Q	0–5	3–5		5–1	5–3	5–1	5–4
4	Mike Breckin (GBR)	3	3	18	23	Q	0–5	2–5	1–5		5–4	5–4	5–0
5	Vicente Calderón (MEX)	2	4	21	25		3–5	1–5	3–5	4–5		5–2	5–3
6	Bülent Erdem (TUR)	1	5	13	28		0–5	1–5	1–5	4–5	2–5		5–3
7	Lester Wong (CAN)	0	6	13	30		0–5	3–5	4–5	0–5	3–5	3–5	

Source: Official Report, vol. 3, p. 248

==== Round 1 Pool H ====
Pos	Fencer	W	L	TF	TA	Qual.	MT	IS	FK	OV	CB	MC
1	Mihai Țiu (ROU)	4	1	21	7	Q		1–5	5–0	5–1	5–1	5–0
2	Ichiro Serizawa (JPN)	4	1	22	8	Q	5–1		2–5	5–1	5–1	5–0
3	František Koukal (TCH)	4	1	20	14	Q	0–5	5–2		5–2	5–3	5–2
4	Omar Vergara (ARG)	2	3	14	21	Q	1–5	1–5	2–5		5–3	5–3
5	Carl Borack (USA)	1	4	13	21		1–5	1–5	3–5	3–5		5–1
6	Magdy Conyd (CAN)	0	5	6	25		0–5	0–5	2–5	3–5	1–5	

Source: Official Report, vol. 3, p. 248

==== Round 1 Pool I ====
The three-way tie for third place was broken by touch quotient (touches for divided by touches against). Nakajima, despite losing more matches than he win, had actually scored more touches than he received—a quotient of 1.125. Gil was second among the tied fencers, with a quotient of 0.875; he advanced along with Nakajima. Obst was eliminated, at 0.700 and last among the tied men.

Pos	Fencer	W	L	TF	TA	Qual.	CN	NG	HN	JG	HO	PS
1	Christian Noël (FRA)	5	0	25	11	Q		5–4	5–2	5–1	5–1	5–3
2	Nicola Granieri (ITA)	3	2	20	15	Q	4–5		5–3	1–5	5–1	5–1
3	Hiroshi Nakajima (JPN)	2	3	18	16	Q	2–5	3–5		5–1	3–5	5–0
4	Jesús Gil (CUB)	2	3	14	16	Q	1–5	5–1	1–5		2–5	5–0
5	Herbert Obst (CAN)	2	3	14	20		1–5	1–5	5–3	5–2		2–5
6	Per Sundberg (SWE)	1	4	9	22		3–5	1–5	0–5	0–5	5–2	

Source: Official Report, vol. 3, p. 249

=== Round 2 ===
==== Round 2 Pool A ====
Pos	Fencer	W	L	TF	TA	Qual.	DR	WW	FK	BP	DA	OV
1	Daniel Revenu (FRA)	5	0	25	7	Q		5–2	5–0	5–3	5–0	5–2
2	Witold Woyda (POL)	4	1	21	12	Q	2–5		4–5	5–1	5–0	5–1
3	František Koukal (TCH)	3	2	19	17	Q	0–5	5–4		5–2	4–5	5–1
4	Barry Paul (GBR)	2	3	16	21	Q	3–5	1–5	2–5		5–4	5–2
5	Dan Alon (ISR)	1	4	14	20		0–5	0–5	5–4	4–5		5–1
6	Omar Vergara (ARG)	0	5	7	25		2–5	1–5	1–5	2–5	1–5	

Source: Official Report, vol. 3, p. 249

==== Round 2 Pool B ====
Pos	Fencer	W	L	TF	TA	Qual.	LK	VD	GP	SH	JG	ES
1	Lech Koziejowski (POL)	5	0	25	10	Q		5–1	5–3	5–1	5–4	5–1
2	Vladimir Denisov (URS)	4	1	21	12	Q	1–5		5–1	5–1	5–4	5–1
3	Graham Paul (GBR)	3	2	19	15	Q	3–5	1–5		5–2	5–1	5–2
4	Ștefan Haukler (ROU)	2	3	14	18	Q	1–5	1–5	2–5		5–2	5–1
5	Jesús Gil (CUB)	1	4	16	22		4–5	4–5	1–5	2–5		5–2
6	Ernest Simon (AUS)	0	5	7	25		1–5	1–5	2–5	1–5	2–5	

Source: Official Report, vol. 3, p. 249

==== Round 2 Pool C ====
Pos	Fencer	W	L	TF	TA	Qual.	NG	MD	KU	BT	LK	CC
1	Nicola Granieri (ITA)	4	1	24	11	Q		4–5	5–3	5–2	5–1	5–0
2	Marek Dąbrowski (POL)	4	1	22	14	Q	5–4		5–2	2–5	5–3	5–0
3	Kiyoshi Uehara (JPN)	3	2	20	15	Q	3–5	2–5		5–2	5–0	5–3
4	Bernard Talvard (FRA)	3	2	19	17	Q	2–5	5–2	2–5		5–2	5–3
5	László Kamuti (HUN)	1	4	11	23		1–5	3–5	0–5	2–5		5–3
6	Carlos Calderón (MEX)	0	5	9	25		0–5	0–5	3–5	3–5	3–5	

Source: Official Report, vol. 3, p. 249

==== Round 2 Pool D ====
Pos	Fencer	W	L	TF	TA	Qual.	JK	AK	CN	KR	TM	RL
1	Jenő Kamuti (HUN)	4	1	23	14	Q		5–1	5–3	5–4	3–5	5–1
2	Anatoly Koteshev (URS)	4	1	19	14	Q	1–5		5–1	3–5	5–1	5–2
3	Christian Noël (FRA)	3	2	19	14	Q	3–5	1–5		5–1	5–2	5–1
4	Klaus Reichert (FRG)	3	2	20	17	Q	4–5	5–3	1–5		5–2	5–2
5	Tănase Mureșanu (ROU)	1	4	15	22		5–3	1–5	2–5	2–5		5–4
6	Roland Losert (AUT)	0	5	10	25		1–5	2–5	1–5	2–5	4–5	

Source: Official Report, vol. 3, p. 249

==== Round 2 Pool E ====
The three-way tie for third was broken by touch quotient. Serizawa was even on touches for and touches received, at 1.000. Wessel was at 17–21 (0.810), beating Breckin by one touch for at 16–21 (0.762). Breckin, at fifth place, was eliminated.

Pos	Fencer	W	L	TF	TA	Qual.	SS	EJ	IS	FW	MB	GB
1	Sándor Szabó (HUN)	5	0	25	13	Q		5–2	5–3	5–3	5–3	5–2
2	Eduardo Jhons (CUB)	3	2	21	17	Q	2–5		4–5	5–1	5–2	5–4
3	Ichiro Serizawa (JPN)	2	3	20	20	Q	3–5	5–4		4–5	5–1	3–5
4	Friedrich Wessel (FRG)	2	3	17	21	Q	3–5	1–5	5–4		3–5	5–2
5	Mike Breckin (GBR)	2	3	16	21		3–5	2–5	2–5	5–3		5–3
6	Greg Benko (AUS)	1	4	16	23		2–5	4–5	5–3	2–5	3–5	

Source: Official Report, vol. 3, p. 250

==== Round 2 Pool F ====
Pos	Fencer	W	L	TF	TA	Qual.	VS	MT	GS	HN	JF	YW
1	Vasyl Stankovych (URS)	4	1	23	13	Q		3–5	5–2	5–3	5–3	5–0
2	Mihai Țiu (ROU)	4	1	24	15	Q	5–3		5–4	5–3	4–5	5–0
3	Guillermo Saucedo (ARG)	3	2	21	16	Q	2–5	4–5		5–4	5–1	5–1
4	Hiroshi Nakajima (JPN)	2	3	20	20	Q	3–5	3–5	4–5		5–2	5–3
5	Joseph Freeman (USA)	2	3	16	19		3–5	5–4	1–5	2–5		5–0
6	Yehuda Weisenstein (ISR)	0	5	4	25		0–5	0–5	1–5	3–5	0–5	

Source: Official Report, vol. 3, p. 250

=== Quarterfinals ===
==== Quarterfinal Pool A ====
Pos	Fencer	W	L	TF	TA	Qual.	DR	MT	MD	EJ	KR	BP
1	Daniel Revenu (FRA)	4	1	24	12	Q		4–5	5–2	5–2	5–2	5–1
2	Mihai Țiu (ROU)	4	1	24	17	Q	5–4		5–4	5–2	5–2	4–5
3	Marek Dąbrowski (POL)	3	2	21	17	Q	2–5	4–5		5–4	5–2	5–1
4	Eduardo Jhons (CUB)	2	3	18	18		2–5	2–5	4–5		5–0	5–3
5	Klaus Reichert (FRG)	1	4	11	20		2–5	2–5	2–5	0–5		5–0
6	Barry Paul (GBR)	1	4	10	24		1–5	5–4	1–5	3–5	0–5	

Source: Official Report, vol. 3, p. 250

==== Quarterfinal Pool B ====
Pos	Fencer	W	L	TF	TA	Qual.	LK	JK	BT	AK	IS	GP
1	Lech Koziejowski (POL)	4	1	21	11	Q		5–3	1–5	5–1	5–0	5–2
2	Jenő Kamuti (HUN)	4	1	23	16	Q	3–5		5–3	5–3	5–4	5–1
3	Bernard Talvard (FRA)	3	2	19	16	Q	5–1	3–5		5–3	1–5	5–2
4	Anatoly Koteshev (URS)	2	3	17	17		1–5	3–5	3–5		5–1	5–1
5	Ichiro Serizawa (JPN)	2	3	15	19		0–5	4–5	5–1	1–5		5–3
6	Graham Paul (GBR)	0	5	9	25		2–5	1–5	2–5	1–5	3–5	

Source: Official Report, vol. 3, p. 250

==== Quarterfinal Pool C ====
Pos	Fencer	W	L	TF	TA	Qual.	WW	VD	SS	HN	FK	GS
1	Witold Woyda (POL)	4	1	23	15	Q		5–4	5–2	3–5	5–2	5–2
2	Vladimir Denisov (URS)	4	1	24	16	Q	4–5		5–3	5–4	5–2	5–2
3	Sándor Szabó (HUN)	3	2	20	18	Q	2–5	3–5		5–2	5–3	5–3
4	Hiroshi Nakajima (JPN)	2	3	20	22		5–3	4–5	2–5		4–5	5–4
5	František Koukal (TCH)	2	3	17	19		2–5	2–5	3–5	5–4		5–0
6	Guillermo Saucedo (ARG)	0	5	11	25		2–5	2–5	3–5	4–5	0–5	

Source: Official Report, vol. 3, p. 250

==== Quarterfinal Pool D ====
Pos	Fencer	W	L	TF	TA	Qual.	FW	NG	CN	VS	KU	SH
1	Friedrich Wessel (FRG)	4	1	24	18	Q		5–4	5–3	4–5	5–3	5–3
2	Nicola Granieri (ITA)	3	2	23	17	Q	4–5		5–4	5–3	5–0	4–5
3	Christian Noël (FRA)	3	2	22	17	Q	3–5	4–5		5–3	5–3	5–1
4	Vasyl Stankovych (URS)	2	3	18	20		5–4	3–5	3–5		2–5	5–1
5	Kiyoshi Uehara (JPN)	2	3	16	21		3–5	0–5	3–5	5–2		5–4
6	Ștefan Haukler (ROU)	1	4	14	24		3–5	5–4	1–5	1–5	4–5	

Source: Official Report, vol. 3, p. 251

=== Semifinals ===
==== Semifinal Pool A ====
Pos	Fencer	W	L	TF	TA	Qual.	MD	JK	WW	NG	DR	SS
1	Marek Dąbrowski (POL)	4	1	24	19	Q		5–3	4–5	5–3	5–4	5–4
2	Jenő Kamuti (HUN)	3	2	20	19	Q	3–5		2–5	5–4	5–4	5–1
3	Witold Woyda (POL)	3	2	20	20	Q	5–4	5–2		5–4	4–5	1–5
4	Nicola Granieri (ITA)	2	3	21	19		3–5	4–5	4–5		5–2	5–2
5	Daniel Revenu (FRA)	2	3	20	22		4–5	4–5	5–4	2–5		5–3
6	Sándor Szabó (HUN)	1	4	15	21		4–5	1–5	5–1	2–5	3–5	

Source: Official Report, vol. 3, p. 251

==== Semifinal Pool B ====
Pos	Fencer	W	L	TF	TA	Qual.	CN	VD	MT	FW	BT	LK
1	Christian Noël (FRA)	5	0	25	16	Q		5–3	5–2	5–3	5–4	5–4
2	Vladimir Denisov (URS)	3	2	20	13	Q	3–5		2–5	5–1	5–2	5–0
3	Mihai Țiu (ROU)	3	2	21	17	Q	2–5	5–2		5–4	5–1	4–5
4	Friedrich Wessel (FRG)	2	3	18	17		3–5	1–5	4–5		5–1	5–1
5	Bernard Talvard (FRA)	1	4	13	22		4–5	2–5	1–5	1–5		5–2
6	Lech Koziejowski (POL)	1	4	12	24		4–5	0–5	5–4	1–5	2–5	

Source: Official Report, vol. 3, p. 251

=== Final ===
The tie for bronze was determined on touch quotient, with Noël (1.000) winning it followed by Țiu (0.850) and Denisov (0.810).

Pos	Fencer	W	L	TF	TA	WW	JK	CN	MT	VD	MD
1st place, gold medalist(s)	Witold Woyda (POL)	5	0	25	7		5–3	5–2	5–0	5–2	5–0
2nd place, silver medalist(s)	Jenő Kamuti (HUN)	4	1	23	19	3–5		5–2	5–4	5–4	5–4
3rd place, bronze medalist(s)	Christian Noël (FRA)	2	3	18	18	2–5	2–5		4–5	5–1	5–2
4	Mihai Țiu (ROU)	2	3	17	20	0–5	4–5	5–4		3–5	5–1
5	Vladimir Denisov (URS)	2	3	17	21	2–5	4–5	1–5	5–3		5–3
6	Marek Dąbrowski (POL)	0	5	10	25	0–5	4–5	2–5	1–5	3–5	

Source: Official Report, vol. 3, p. 251

Fencer	Country
Witold Woyda	Poland
Jenő Kamuti	Hungary
Christian Noël	France
Mihai Țiu	Romania
Vladimir Denisov	Soviet Union
Marek Dąbrowski	Poland
Nicola Granieri	Italy
Friedrich Wessel	West Germany
Daniel Revenu	France
Bernard Talvard	France
Sándor Szabó	Hungary
Lech Koziejowski	Poland
Eduardo Jhons	Cuba
Anatoly Koteshev	Soviet Union
Hiroshi Nakajima	Japan
Vasyl Stankovych	Soviet Union
Klaus Reichert	West Germany
Ichiro Serizawa	Japan
František Koukal	Czechoslovakia
Kiyoshi Uehara	Japan
Barry Paul	Great Britain
Graham Paul	Great Britain
Guillermo Saucedo	Argentina
Ștefan Haukler	Romania
Dan Alon	Israel
Jesús Gil	Cuba
László Kamuti	Hungary
Tănase Mureșanu	Romania
Mike Breckin	Great Britain
Joseph Freeman	United States
Omar Vergara	Argentina
Ernest Simon	Australia
Carlos Calderón	Mexico
Roland Losert	Austria
Greg Benko	Australia
Yehuda Weisenstein	Israel
Ali Asghar Pashapour	Iran
Stefano Simoncelli	Italy
Harald Hein	West Germany
Arcangelo Pinelli	Italy
Enrique Salvat	Cuba
Fernando Lupiz	Argentina
Vicente Calderón	Mexico
Carl Borack	United States
Herbert Obst	Canada
Chan Matthew	Hong Kong
John Nonna	United States
Andreas Vgenopoulos	Greece
John Bouchier-Hayes	Ireland
Yves Daniel Darricau	Lebanon
Fawzi Merhi	Lebanon
Bülent Erdem	Turkey
Magdy Conyd	Canada
Per Sundberg	Sweden
Ali Sleiman	Lebanon
Robert Elliott	Hong Kong
Lester Wong	Canada
