= Fencing at the 1976 Summer Olympics – Men's team foil =

Men's team foil at the Games of the XXI Olympiad
- Venue: University of Montréal
- Dates: 24–25 July 1976
- Competitors: 63 from 14 nations

Medalists
1st place, gold medalist(s)		Thomas Bach; Harald Hein; Klaus Reichert; Matthias Behr; Erk Sens-Gorius	West Germany
2nd place, silver medalist(s)		Carlo Montano; Fabio Dal Zotto; Stefano Simoncelli; Giovanni Battista Coletti; Attilio Calatroni	Italy
3rd place, bronze medalist(s)		Daniel Revenu; Christian Noël; Didier Flament; Bernard Talvard; Frédéric Pietruszka	France

The men's team foil was one of eight fencing events on the fencing at the 1976 Summer Olympics programme. It was the fourteenth appearance of the event. The competition was held from 24 to 25 July 1976. 63 fencers from 14 nations competed.

One of the gold medalists from West Germany team was Thomas Bach, who went on to serve as President of the International Olympic Committee from 2013 to 2025.

== Participating teams ==
Cuba
- Eduardo Jhons
- Enrique Salvat
- Jorge Garbey
- Pedro Hernández

France
- Daniel Revenu
- Christian Noël
- Didier Flament
- Bernard Talvard
- Frédéric Pietruszka

Great Britain
- Geoffrey Grimmett
- Barry Paul
- Rob Bruniges
- Graham Paul
- Nick Bell

Hong Kong
- Chan Matthew
- Denis Cunningham
- Kam Roger
- Ng Wing Biu

Hungary
- József Komatits
- Csaba Fenyvesi
- Lajos Somodi Jr.
- Jenő Kamuti
- Sándor Erdős

Iran
- Hossein Niknam
- Sarkis Assatourian
- Ali Asghar Pashapour-Alamdari
- Ahmed Akbari

Italy
- Carlo Montano
- Fabio Dal Zotto
- Stefano Simoncelli
- Giovanni Battista Coletti
- Attilio Calatroni

Japan
- Masanori Kawatsu
- Hideaki Kamei
- Toshio Jingu
- Noriyuki Sato

Kuwait
- Ahmed Al-Arbeed
- Jamal Ameen
- Ali Al-Khawajah
- Abdul Nasser Al-Sayegh

Poland
- Leszek Martewicz
- Lech Koziejowski
- Ziemowit Wojciechowski
- Arkadiusz Godel
- Marek Dąbrowski

Romania
- Petru Kuki
- Mihai Țiu
- Tudor Petruș
- Petrică Buricea

Soviet Union
- Sabirzhan Ruziyev
- Aleksandr Romankov
- Vladimir Denisov
- Vasyl Stankovych

United States
- Martin Lang
- Ed Ballinger
- Ed Wright
- Edward Donofrio
- Brooke Makler

West Germany
- Thomas Bach
- Harald Hein
- Klaus Reichert
- Matthias Behr
- Erk Sens-Gorius

== Results ==
=== Round 1 ===
==== Round 1 Pool A ====
Great Britain and the Soviet Union each defeated Romania, 8–8 (59–52) and 9–7, respectively. The two victors then faced off. The Soviet Union won 9–3.

Pos	Team	W	L	BW	BL	Qual.	URS	GBR	ROU
1	Soviet Union	2	0	18	10	QQ		9–3	9–7
2	Great Britain	1	1	11	17	QQ	3–9		8.59–8.52
3	Romania	0	2	15	17		7–9	8.52–8.59	

Source: Official Report, vol. 3, p. 247

==== Round 1 Pool B ====
Hungary and France each defeated Cuba, 10–6 and 11–5, respectively. The two victors then faced off. France won 9–1.

Pos	Team	W	L	BW	BL	Qual.	FRA	HUN	CUB
1	France	2	0	20	6	QQ		9–1	11–5
2	Hungary	1	1	11	15	QQ	1–9		10–6
3	Cuba	0	2	11	21		5–11	6–10	

Source: Official Report, vol. 3, p. 247

==== Round 1 Pool C ====
The first two rounds of matches left Italy and West Germany at 2–0 apiece (advancing to the knockout rounds) and Japan and Kuwait at 0–2 each (eliminating them). Italy defeated West Germany 9–7 to take the top spot in the group. Kuwait finished with only a single bout won, out of 48.

Pos	Team	W	L	BW	BL	Qual.	ITA	FRG	JPN	KUW
1	Italy	3	0	37	11	QQ		9–7	12–4	16–0
2	West Germany	2	1	33	15	QQ	7–9		11–5	15–1
3	Japan	1	2	25	23		4–12	5–11		16–0
4	Kuwait	0	3	1	47		0–16	1–15	0–16	

Source: Official Report, vol. 3, p. 248

==== Round 1 Pool D ====
The first two rounds of matches left Poland and the United States at 2–0 apiece (advancing to the knockout rounds) and Hong Kong and Iran at 0–2 each (eliminating them). Poland defeated the United States 9–2 to take the top spot in the group.

Pos	Team	W	L	BW	BL	Qual.	POL	USA	IRI	HKG
1	Poland	3	0	37	11	QQ		9–2	13–3	15–1
2	United States	2	1	33	15	QQ	2–9		12–4	15–1
3	Iran	1	2	25	23		3–13	4–12		9–7
4	Hong Kong	0	3	9	39		1–15	1–15	7–9	

Source: Official Report, vol. 3, p. 249

=== Elimination rounds ===
Quarterfinals
A1	Soviet Union	9
B2	Hungary	3
D1	Poland	4
C2	West Germany	9
C1	Italy	9
D2	United States	3
B1	France	9
A2	Great Britain	3

Semifinals
A1	Soviet Union	7
C2	West Germany	9
C1	Italy	8 (61)
B1	France	8 (59)

Final
C2	West Germany	9
C1	Italy	6
Third place
A1	Soviet Union	4
B1	France	9

Consolation round
B2	Hungary	3
D1	Poland	9
D2	United States	7
A2	Great Britain	8

Fifth place
D1	Poland	9
A2	Great Britain	1
