= Fencing at the 1972 Summer Olympics – Men's team foil =

Men's team foil at the Games of the XX Olympiad
- Venue: Exhibition Halls 12 & 20
- Dates: 1 – 2 September 1972
- Competitors: 63 from 13 nations

Medalists
1st place, gold medalist(s)		Witold Woyda; Lech Koziejowski; Jerzy Kaczmarek; Marek Dąbrowski; Arkadiusz Godel	Poland
2nd place, silver medalist(s)		Vasyl Stankovych; Viktor Putyatin; Anatoly Koteshev; Vladimir Denisov; Leonid Romanov	Soviet Union
3rd place, bronze medalist(s)		Jean-Claude Magnan; Daniel Revenu; Christian Noël; Gilles Berolatti; Bernard Talvard	France

The men's team foil was one of eight fencing events on the fencing at the 1972 Summer Olympics programme. It was the thirteenth appearance of the event. The competition was held from 1 to 2 September 1972. 63 fencers from 13 nations competed.

== Rosters ==
Canada
- Magdy Conyd
- Herbert Obst
- Gerry Wiedel
- Lester Wong

Cuba
- Evelio González
- Eduardo Jhons
- Jesús Gil
- Enrique Salvat
- Jorge Garbey

France
- Jean-Claude Magnan
- Daniel Revenu
- Christian Noël
- Gilles Berolatti
- Bernard Talvard

Great Britain
- Mike Breckin
- Barry Paul
- Graham Paul
- Anthony Power
- Ian Single

Hungary
- Sándor Szabó
- Csaba Fenyvesi
- László Kamuti
- István Marton
- Jenő Kamuti

Italy
- Alfredo Del Francia
- Nicola Granieri
- Carlo Montano
- Arcangelo Pinelli
- Stefano Simoncelli

Japan
- Shiro Maruyama
- Masaya Fukuda
- Hiroshi Nakajima
- Kiyoshi Uehara
- Ichiro Serizawa

Lebanon
- Ali Chekr
- Yves Daniel Darricau
- Fawzi Merhi
- Ali Sleiman

Poland
- Witold Woyda
- Lech Koziejowski
- Jerzy Kaczmarek
- Marek Dąbrowski
- Arkadiusz Godel

Romania
- Iuliu Falb
- Ștefan Haukler
- Mihai Țiu
- Tănase Mureșanu
- Aurel Ștefan

Soviet Union
- Vasyl Stankovych
- Viktor Putyatin
- Anatoly Koteshev
- Vladimir Denisov
- Leonid Romanov

United States
- Carl Borack
- Martin Jay Davis
- Joseph Freeman
- John Nonna
- Tyrone Simmons

West Germany
- Klaus Reichert
- Friedrich Wessel
- Harald Hein
- Dieter Wellmann
- Erk Sens-Gorius

== Results ==
=== Round 1 ===
==== Round 1 Pool A ====
West Germany and Poland each defeated Italy, 12–4 and 11–5, respectively. The two victors then faced off. West Germany won 8–7, with a 61–55 touches advantage making the final bout irrelevant.

Pos	Team	W	L	BW	BL	Qual.	FRG	POL	ITA
1	West Germany	2	0	20	11	Q		8–7	12–4
2	Poland	1	1	18	13	Q	7–8		11–5
3	Italy	0	2	9	23		4–12	5–11	

Source: Official Report, vol. 3, pp. 263–64

==== Round 1 Pool B ====
Cuba and France each defeated Great Britain, 11–5 and 10–6, respectively. The two victors then faced off. France won 9–1.

Pos	Team	W	L	BW	BL	Qual.	FRA	CUB	GBR
1	France	2	0	19	7	Q		9–1	10–6
2	Cuba	1	1	12	14	Q	1–9		11–5
3	Great Britain	0	2	11	21		6–10	5–11	

Source: Official Report, vol. 3, pp. 263–64

==== Round 1 Pool C ====
Japan and the Soviet Union each defeated United States 12–4. The two victors then faced off. Japan won 9–7.

Pos	Team	W	L	BW	BL	Qual.	JPN	URS	USA
1	Japan	2	0	21	11	Q		9–7	12–4
2	Soviet Union	1	1	19	13	Q	7–9		12–4
3	United States	0	2	8	24		4–12	4–12	

Source: Official Report, vol. 3, pp. 263–64

==== Round 1 Pool D ====
In the first set of matches, Hungary defeated Lebanon 13–3 and Romania shut out Canada 16–0. In the second, Hungary beat Canada 13–3 and Romania won over Lebanon 9–7. Canada and Lebanon were eliminated and did not face each other; Hungary and Romania vied for position within the group, with Hungary winning 8–7 (with a 62–55 touches advantage making the 16th bout unnecessary).

Pos	Team	W	L	BW	BL	Qual.	HUN	ROU	LIB	CAN
1	Hungary	3	0	34	13	Q		8–7	13–3	13–3
2	Romania	2	1	32	15	Q	7–8		9–7	16–0
3	Lebanon	0	2	10	22		3–13	7–9		
4	Canada	0	2	3	29		3–13	0–16		

Source: Official Report, vol. 3, pp. 263–64

=== Elimination rounds ===
Quarterfinals
B1	France	9
D2	Romania	6
A1	West Germany	6
C2	Soviet Union	9
C1	Japan	5
A2	Poland	9
D1	Hungary	9
B2	Cuba	6

Semifinals
B1	France	6
C2	Soviet Union	9
A2	Poland	8
D1	Hungary	7

Final
C2	Soviet Union	5
A2	Poland	9
Third place
B1	France	9
D1	Hungary	7

Consolation Round
D2	Romania	3
A1	West Germany	9
C1	Japan	9
B2	Cuba	6

Fifth Place
A1	West Germany	9
C1	Japan	7
