= Jean-Claude Magnan =

French fencer (born 1941)

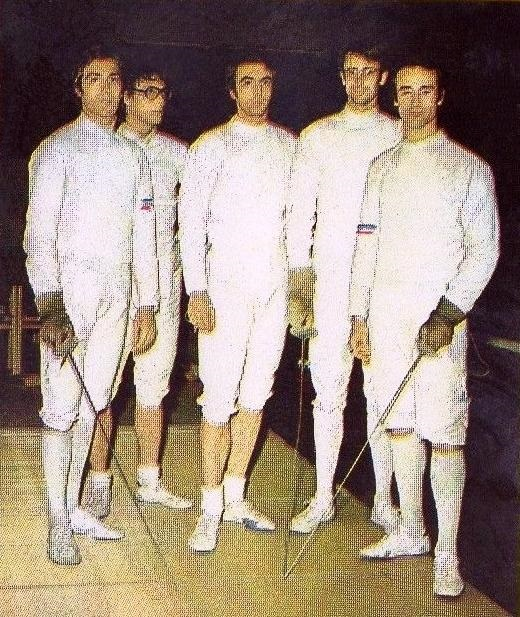
- The French Olympic foil team in 1972 (Talvard, Magnan, Noël, Revenu and Berolatti)

Personal information
- Born: 4 June 1941 (age 85) Aubagne, France

Sport
- Sport: Fencing
Medal record
Men's fencing
Representing France
Olympic Games
Gold medal – first place	1968 Mexico City	Team foil
Silver medal – second place	1964 Tokyo	Individual foil
Bronze medal – third place	1964 Tokyo	Team foil
Bronze medal – third place	1972 Munich	Team foil
Mediterranean Games
Gold medal – first place	1963 Naples	Individual foil

Jean-Claude Magnan (born 4 June 1941 in Aubagne, Bouches-du-Rhône) is a French fencer and Olympic champion in foil competition, and a medalist in three successive Olympics.

He received a gold medal in foil team at the 1968 Summer Olympics in Mexico City, together with Gilles Berolatti, Christian Noël, Daniel Revenu and Jacques Dimont. He participated and received medals at the 1964, 1968 and 1972 summer Olympics.

He also won a gold medal at the 1963 Mediterranean Games in the individual foil event.
