= Gilles Berolatti =

French fencer (born 1944)

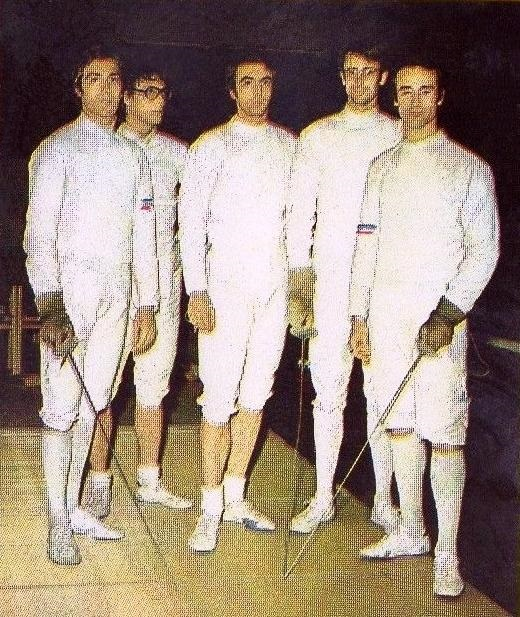
- The French Olympic foil team in 1972 (Talvard, Magnan, Noël, Revenu and Berolatti).

Personal information
- Born: 4 May 1944 (age 82) Paris, France

Sport
- Sport: Fencing
Medal record
Men's fencing
Representing France
Olympic Games
Gold medal – first place	1968 Mexico City	Foil Team
Bronze medal – third place	1972 Munich	Foil Team

Gilles Berolatti (born 4 May 1944) is a French fencer and olympic champion in foil competition.

He received a gold medal in the team foil at the 1968 Summer Olympics in Mexico City, together with Daniel Revenu, Christian Noël, Jean-Claude Magnan and Jacques Dimont.
