= Furedi =

Furedi or Füredi is a Hungarian surname that may refer to

- Ann Furedi (born 1960), British activist
- Frank Furedi (born 1947), Hungarian-British sociologist, husband of Ann
- Gábor Füredi (born 1944), Hungarian fencer
- Lily Furedi (1896–1969), Hungarian-American artist
- Zoltán Füredi (born 1954), Hungarian mathematician
