= Daniel Revenu =

French fencer (1942–2024)

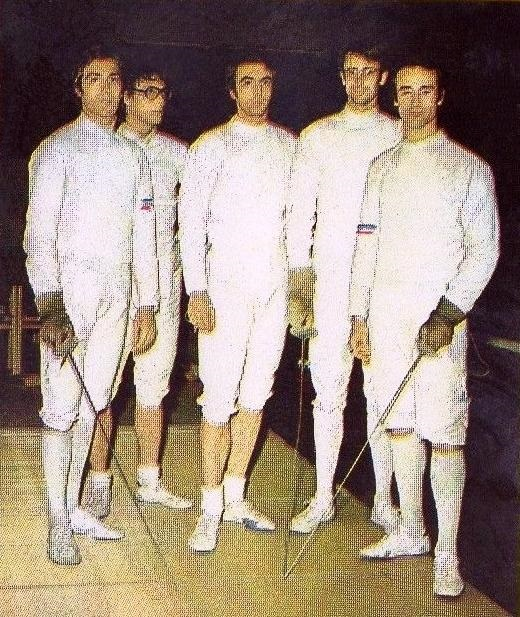
- The French Olympic foil team in 1972 (Talvard, Magnan, Noël, Revenu and Berolatti).

Personal information
- Nationality: French
- Born: 5 December 1942 Issoudun, Indre, German-occupied France
- Died: 2 January 2024 (aged 81) Melun, Seine et Marne
- Height: 186 cm (6 ft 1 in)

Sport
- Country: France
- Sport: Fencing
Medal record
Men's fencing
Representing France
Olympic Games
Gold medal – first place	1968 Mexico City	Team foil
Bronze medal – third place	1964 Tokyo	Individual foil
Bronze medal – third place	1964 Tokyo	Team foil
Bronze medal – third place	1968 Mexico City	Individual foil
Bronze medal – third place	1972 Munich	Team foil
Bronze medal – third place	1976 Montreal	Team foil
World Championships
Gold medal – first place	1971 Vienna	Team foil
Gold medal – first place	1975 Budapest	Team foil
Silver medal – second place	1965 Paris	Individual foil
Bronze medal – third place	1963 Gdansk	Team foil
Bronze medal – third place	1965 Paris	Team foil
Bronze medal – third place	1974 Grenoble	Team foil
Summer Universiade
Gold medal – first place	1965 Budapest	Team foil
Silver medal – second place	1967 Tokyo	Individual foil
Bronze medal – third place	1963 Porto Alegre	Individual foil
Bronze medal – third place	1965 Budapest	Individual foil
Bronze medal – third place	1967 Tokyo	Team foil
Bronze medal – third place	1967 Tokyo	Team sabre

Daniel Jean Claude Ernest Revenu (5 December 1942 – 2 January 2024) was a French fencer and Olympic champion in foil competition, and medalist in four successive Olympics.

== Biography ==
Daniel Revenu was born on 5 December 1942, the son of French fencing coach Ernest Revenu, from Melun. In the 1960s and 1970s Ernest Revenu trained Olympic, world and national fencing champions - Bruno Boscherie, Bernard Talvard, Hugues Leseur, Daniel Provost, Jacky Courtillat, Frédéric Pietruszka and his own son Daniel.

Revenu received a gold medal in foil team at the 1968 Summer Olympics in Mexico City, together with Gilles Berolatti, Christian Noël, Jean-Claude Magnan, and Jacques Dimont. He participated and received medals at the 1964, 1968, 1972 and 1976 summer Olympics.

Daniel Revenu died on 2 January 2024, at the age of 81.
