= István Marton =

István Marton may refer to:

- István Marton (fencer)
- István Marton (politician)
