= Kawatsu =

Kawatsu (written: 川津 or 河津) is a Japanese surname. Notable people with the surname include:

- Kentaro Kawatsu (河津 憲太郎, 1914–1970), Japanese swimmer
- Masanori Kawatsu (川津 正徳, born 1948), Japanese fencer
