= Jingu =

Jingu may refer to:

== People ==
- Empress Jingū (c. AD 169–269)
- Toshio Jingu (born 1948), a Japanese fencer

== Other uses ==
- Jingu Stadium, Tokyo, Japan
- Jingū, a name for Shinto shrines connected to the Imperial House of Japan
- Busanjin District, South Korea, abbreviated locally as "Jin-gu"
- Ise Grand Shrine, known simply as Jingū (The Shrine)
  - Other shrines called by this at list of Jingu
- Jingū taima, an ofuda issued by the Ise Grand Shrine
