= Vladimir Denisov =

Vladimir Denisov may refer to:

- Vladimir Denisov (ice hockey) (born 1984), Belarusian ice hockey player
- Vladimir Denisov (fencer) (born 1947), Russian Olympic fencer
