= Jacques Dimont =

French fencer (1945–1994)

Personal information
- Full name: Jacques René Émile Dimont
- Born: 2 February 1945 Carvin, France
- Died: 31 December 1994 (aged 49) Avignon, France

Sport
- Sport: Fencing
Medal record
Men's fencing
Representing France
Olympic Games
Gold medal – first place	1968 Mexico City	Team foil

Jacques René Émile Dimont (2 February 1945 – 31 December 1994) was a French fencer and Olympic champion in foil competition.

He received a gold medal in the team foil at the 1968 Summer Olympics in Mexico City, together with Gilles Berolatti, Christian Noël, Jean-Claude Magnan and Daniel Revenu.

He was married to the swimmer Danièle Dorléans.

Dimont died in 1994, at the age of 49. The cause of death was suicide.
