= Jorge Garbey =

Jorge Garbey can refer to:

- Jorge Garbey (fencer) (born 1953), Cuban fencer
- Jorge Garbey (volleyball) (born 1954), volleyball player
