= Dan Alon =

Israeli fencer (1945–2018)

Personal information
- Native name: דן אלון
- Nationality: Israeli
- Born: 28 March 1945
- Died: 31 January 2018 (aged 72)

Sport
- Country: Israel
- Sport: Fencing

Dan Alon (Hebrew: דן אלון; 28 March 1945 – 31 January 2018) was an Israeli fencer. He competed in the individual foil event at the 1972 Summer Olympics, at the age of 27. He was placed fourth in round one with three wins (defeating John Bouchier-Hayes of Ireland, Arcangelo Pinelli of Italy, and Klaus Reichert of West Germany) and two losses and advanced to round two. There, he placed fifth with two wins (defeating Omar Vergara of Argentina and František Koukal of Czechoslovakia) and three losses, and was eliminated.

He was among six Israeli team members who avoided being captured by terrorists in the Munich massacre. He and four teammates were in apartment 2 of the building at Connollystraße 31, and while the terrorists captured the Israeli residents in nearby apartments 1 and 3, they passed by this apartment, presumably led to believe by one of the kidnapped Israelis that this apartment was not occupied by Israelis. All five residents of apartment 2 managed to leave the building through the garden and flee to safety.

In 2012, Alon released a book entitled Munich Memoir, co-authored by Carla Stockton, recounting his experiences at the 1972 Munich Olympics, and the impact on his life.

Alon died from cancer on 31 January 2018 at age 72.
