= Joseph Freeman =

Joseph Freeman may refer to:

- Joseph Freeman (fencer) (born 1948), American Olympic fencer
- Joseph Freeman (Mormon) (born 1952), African-American Mormon religious leader
- Joseph Freeman (politician) (1765–1839), Canadian politician
- Joseph Freeman (writer) (1897–1965), American left-wing writer and magazine editor

== See also ==
- Joseph S. Freedman (born 1946), professor of education at Alabama State University
- Joseph Friedman (1900–1982), American inventor
