= Serizawa =

Serizawa (written: 芹沢 or 芹澤) is a Japanese surname. Notable people with the surname include:

- Hiroaki Serizawa (芹澤 廣明; born 1948), Japanese singer-songwriter
- Ichiro Serizawa (芹沢 一郎; born 1945), Japanese fencer
- Keisuke Serizawa (芹沢 銈介; 1895–1984), Japanese textile designer
- Serizawa Kamo (芹沢 鴨; 1826–1863), Japanese samurai and commander of the Shinsengumi
- Naoki Serizawa (芹沢 直樹; born 1976), Japanese artist
- Nobuo Serizawa (芹澤 信雄; born 1959), Japanese golfer
- Yū Serizawa (芹澤 優; born 1994), Japanese singer/voice actress

== Fictional characters ==
- Reira Serizawa (芹澤 レイラ), character in the manga series Nana
- Daisuke Serizawa, a character from Godzilla (1954)
  - Ishiro Serizawa, a reimagined version of Daisuke Serizawa, appearing in Godzilla (2014) and Godzilla: King of the Monsters (2019)
- Katsuya Serizawa (芹沢 克也), a character in the manga series Mob Psycho 100
- Urara Serizawa, a character in Persona 2: Eternal Punishment
