= Fabio Dal Zotto =

Italian fencer (born 1957)

Personal information
- Born: 17 July 1957 (age 68) Vicenza, Italy

Sport
- Sport: Fencing
Medal record
Men's fencing
Representing Italy
Olympic Games
Gold medal – first place	1976 Montreal	Foil Individual
Silver medal – second place	1976 Montreal	Foil Team

Fabio Dal Zotto (born 17 July 1957) is an Italian fencer and Olympic champion in foil competition.

He won a gold medal in the individual foil event at the 1976 Summer Olympics in Montreal and a silver in the team event.
