= Leonid Romanov =

Soviet fencer (born 1947)

Personal information
- Born: 13 February 1947 (age 79) Moscow, Soviet Union

Sport
- Sport: Fencing
Medal record
Representing Soviet Union
Olympic Games
Silver medal – second place	1972 Munich	Team foil
World Championships
Gold medal – first place	1969 Havana	Team foil
Gold medal – first place	1970 Ankara	Team foil
Silver medal – second place	1967 Montreal	Team foil
Silver medal – second place	1970 Ankara	Individual foil
Bronze medal – third place	1971 Vienna	Individual foil
Bronze medal – third place	1971 Vienna	Team foil
Summer Universiade
Gold medal – first place	1970 Turin	Individual foil
Gold medal – first place	1970 Turin	Team foil

Leonid Romanov (Russian: Леонид Михайлович Романов; born 13 February 1947) is a Soviet fencer. He won a silver medal in the team foil event at the 1972 Summer Olympics.
