= Giovanni Battista Coletti =

Italian fencer (born 1948)

Personal information
- Born: 8 December 1948 (age 77) Treviso, Italy

Sport
- Sport: Fencing
Medal record
Men's fencing
Representing Italy
Olympic Games
Silver medal – second place	1976 Montréal	Team foil
Mediterranean Games
Bronze medal – third place	1975 Algiers	Individual foil

Giovanni Battista Coletti (born 8 December 1948) is an Italian fencer. He won a silver medal in the team foil event at the 1976 Summer Olympics and a bronze medal in the individual foil event at the 1975 Mediterranean Games.
