= Sally Pechinsky =

American fencer

Personal information
- Born: March 4, 1950 (age 76) Danvers, Massachusetts, United States

Sport
- Sport: Fencing

Sally Pechinsky (born March 4, 1950) is an American former foil fencer. She competed in the women's team foil event at the 1968 Summer Olympics. She is married to fellow American fencer Edward Ballinger.
