= Attilio Calatroni =

Italian fencer (born 1950)

Personal information
- Born: 18 July 1950 (age 75) Brescia, Italy

Sport
- Sport: Fencing
Medal record
Men's fencing
Representing Italy
Olympic Games
Silver medal – second place	1976 Montréal	Foil, team

Attilio Calatroni (born 18 July 1950) is an Italian fencer. He won a silver medal in the team foil event at the 1976 Summer Olympics.
