= Yehuda Weisenstein =

Israeli fencer

Personal information
- Native name: יהודה וינשטיין
- Nationality: Israeli
- Born: 11 March 1955 (age 71)

Sport
- Country: Israel
- Sport: Fencing

Yehuda Weisenstein (Hebrew: יהודה וינשטיין; born 11 March 1955), known also as Moshe Yehuda Weinstein, is an Israeli former fencer. He competed in the individual foil event at the 1972 Summer Olympics when he was 17 years old. He was ranked fourth in his pool in round one with two wins (defeating American John Nonna and British fencer Graham Paul) and three losses and advanced to round two, where he lost all five bouts and was eliminated.

He was among several Israeli team members that avoided being captured by terrorists in the Munich massacre. He and four teammates were in apartment 2 of the building at Connollystraße 31, and while the terrorists captured the Israeli residents in nearby apartments 1 and 3, they passed by this apartment, presumably led to believe by one of the kidnapped Israelis that this apartment was not occupied by Israelis. All five residents of apartment 2 managed to leave the building through the balcony and flee to safety.
