= Jerzy Kaczmarek =

Polish fencer (born 1948)

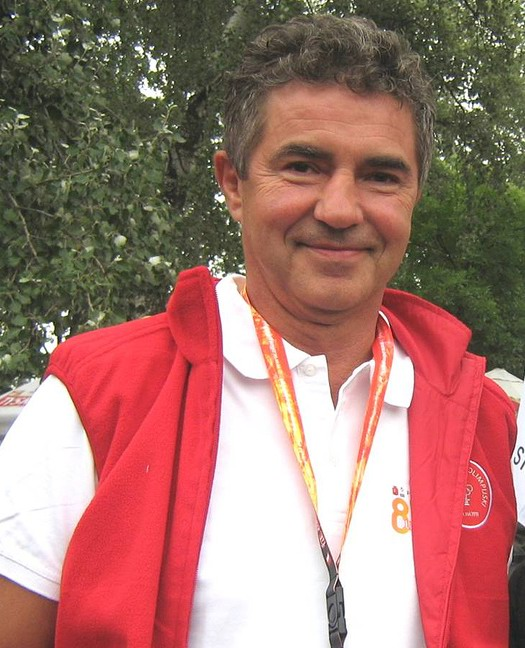
- Jerzy Kaczmarek

Personal information
- Born: 8 January 1948 (age 78) Lubsko, Poland

Sport
- Sport: Fencing
Medal record
Men's fencing
Representing Poland
Olympic Games
Gold medal – first place	1972 Munich	Foil, team

Jerzy Kaczmarek (born 8 January 1948) is a Polish fencer. He won a gold medal in the team foil event at the 1972 Summer Olympics.
