= Witold Woyda =

Polish fencer (1939–2008)

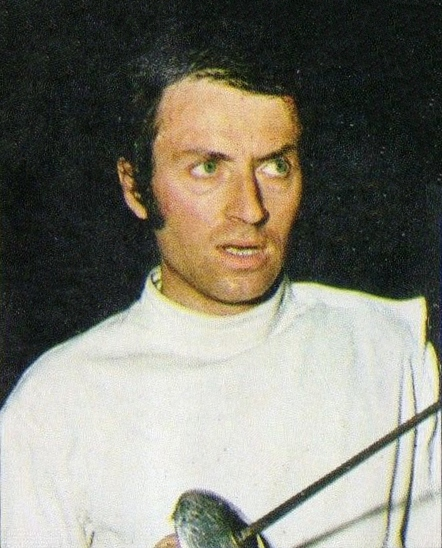
- Witold Woyda c. 1974

Personal information
- Born: 10 May 1939 Poznań, Poland
- Died: 5 May 2008 (aged 68) Bronxville, New York, United States
- Height: 168 cm (5 ft 6 in)
- Weight: 63 kg (139 lb)

Sport
- Sport: Fencing
- Club: Budowlani Warsaw; Marymont Warsaw
Medal record
Representing Poland
Olympic Games
Gold medal – first place	1972 Munich	Foil ind.
Gold medal – first place	1972 Munich	Foil team
Silver medal – second place	1964 Tokyo	Foil team
Bronze medal – third place	1968 Mexico City	Foil team
World Fencing Championships
Silver medal – second place	1962 Buenos Aires	Foil ind.
Silver medal – second place	1963 Gdańsk,	Foil team
Silver medal – second place	1965 Paris	Foil team
Silver medal – second place	1969 Havana	Foil team
Silver medal – second place	1971 Vienna	Foil team
Bronze medal – third place	1961 Turin	Foil team
Bronze medal – third place	1962 Buenos Aires	Foil team
Bronze medal – third place	1966 Moscow	Foil team
Bronze medal – third place	1967 Montreal	Foil team
Bronze medal – third place	1973 Gothenburg	Foil team

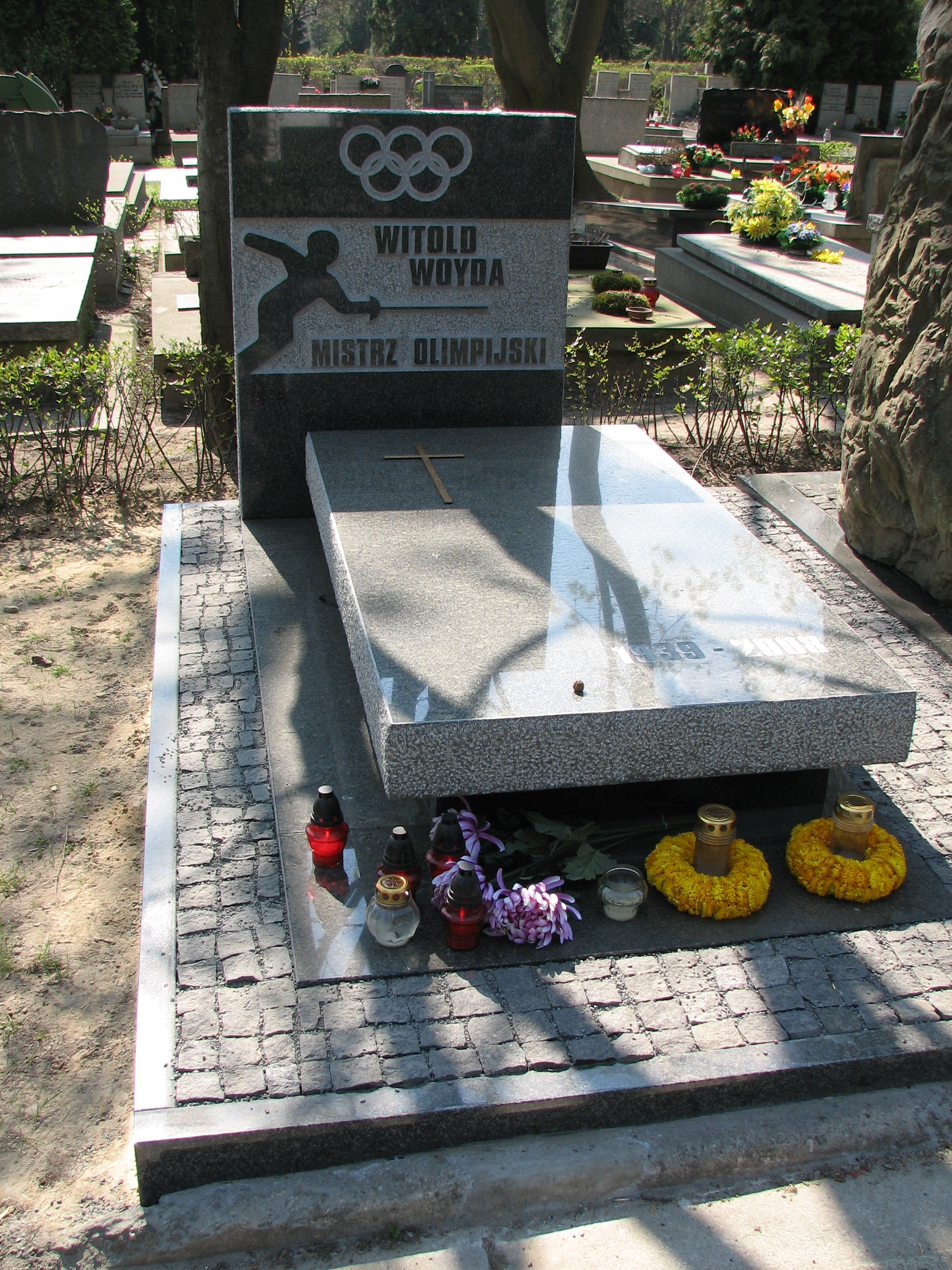
Woyda's grave in Warsaw

Witold Woyda (10 May 1939 – 5 May 2008) was a Polish fencer who won four Olympic medals in the foil between 1964 and 1972, including two gold medals at the 1972 Summer Olympics. He was named the Polish Sportspersonality of the Year for 1972 by readers of Przegląd Sportowy. Born in Poznań, he immigrated to the United States in the late 1970s, settling in Bronxville, New York, and worked for an Italian packaging company. He had lung cancer for two years prior to his death at his Bronxville home at age 68, five days shy of turning 69.
