= 1970 World Fencing Championships =

International fencing competition

1970 World Championships in Fencing
- Host city: Ankara, Turkey

The 1970 World Fencing Championships were held in Ankara, Turkey.

== Medal table ==
Rank	Nation	Gold	Silver	Bronze	Total
1	Soviet Union (URS)	5	4	1	10
2	Hungary (HUN)	2	2	1	5
3	West Germany (FRG)	1	0	0	1
4	Poland (POL)	0	1	2	3
4	Romania (ROU)	0	1	2	3
6	France (FRA)	0	0	1	1
6	Switzerland (SUI)	0	0	1	1
Totals (7 entries)		8	8	8	24

== Medal summary ==
=== Men's events ===
Event	Gold	Silver	Bronze
Individual Foil	(West Germany) Friedrich Wessel	(Soviet Union) Leonid Romanov	(Polish People's Republic) Marek Dąbrowski
Team Foil	Soviet Union	(Hungarian People's Republic) Hungary	(Socialist Republic of Romania) Romania
Individual Sabre	(Hungarian People's Republic) Tibor Pézsa	(Soviet Union) Mark Rakita	(Soviet Union) Vladimir Nazlymov
Team Sabre	Soviet Union	(Hungarian People's Republic) Hungary	(Polish People's Republic) Poland
Individual Épée	(Soviet Union) Aleksey Nikanchikov	(Soviet Union) Sergey Paramonov	(Hungarian People's Republic) Csaba Fenyvesi
Team Épée	(Hungarian People's Republic) Hungary	(Polish People's Republic) Poland	Switzerland

=== Women's events ===
Event	Gold	Silver	Bronze
Individual Foil	(Soviet Union) Galina Gorokhova	(Soviet Union) Elena Belova	(Socialist Republic of Romania) Olga Szabó-Orbán
Team Foil	Soviet Union	(Socialist Republic of Romania) Romania	France
