= José Samalot =

Puerto Rican fencer

Personal information
- Born: 24 March 1947 (age 79)

Sport
- Sport: Fencing

José Samalot (born 24 March 1947) is a Puerto Rican fencer. He competed in the individual foil event at the 1976 Summer Olympics.
