= Anatoly Koteshev =

Soviet fencer (born 1944)

Personal information
- Born: 16 July 1944 (age 81)

Sport
- Sport: Fencing
Medal record
Men's fencing
Representing Soviet Union
Olympic Games
Silver medal – second place	1972 Munich	Foil, team

Anatoly Koteshev (Russian: Анатолий Алексеевич Котешев; born 16 July 1944) is a Soviet fencer. He won a silver medal in the team foil event at the 1972 Summer Olympics.
