= Anthony Power =

British fencer

Personal information
- Born: 13 May 1945 (age 81)
- Died: 23/12/2023 Harrogate, North yorkshire

Sport
- Sport: Fencing

Anthony Power (born 13 May 1945) is a British fencer. He competed in the team foil event at the 1972 Summer Olympics.
