= Arkadiusz Godel =

Polish fencer (born 1952)

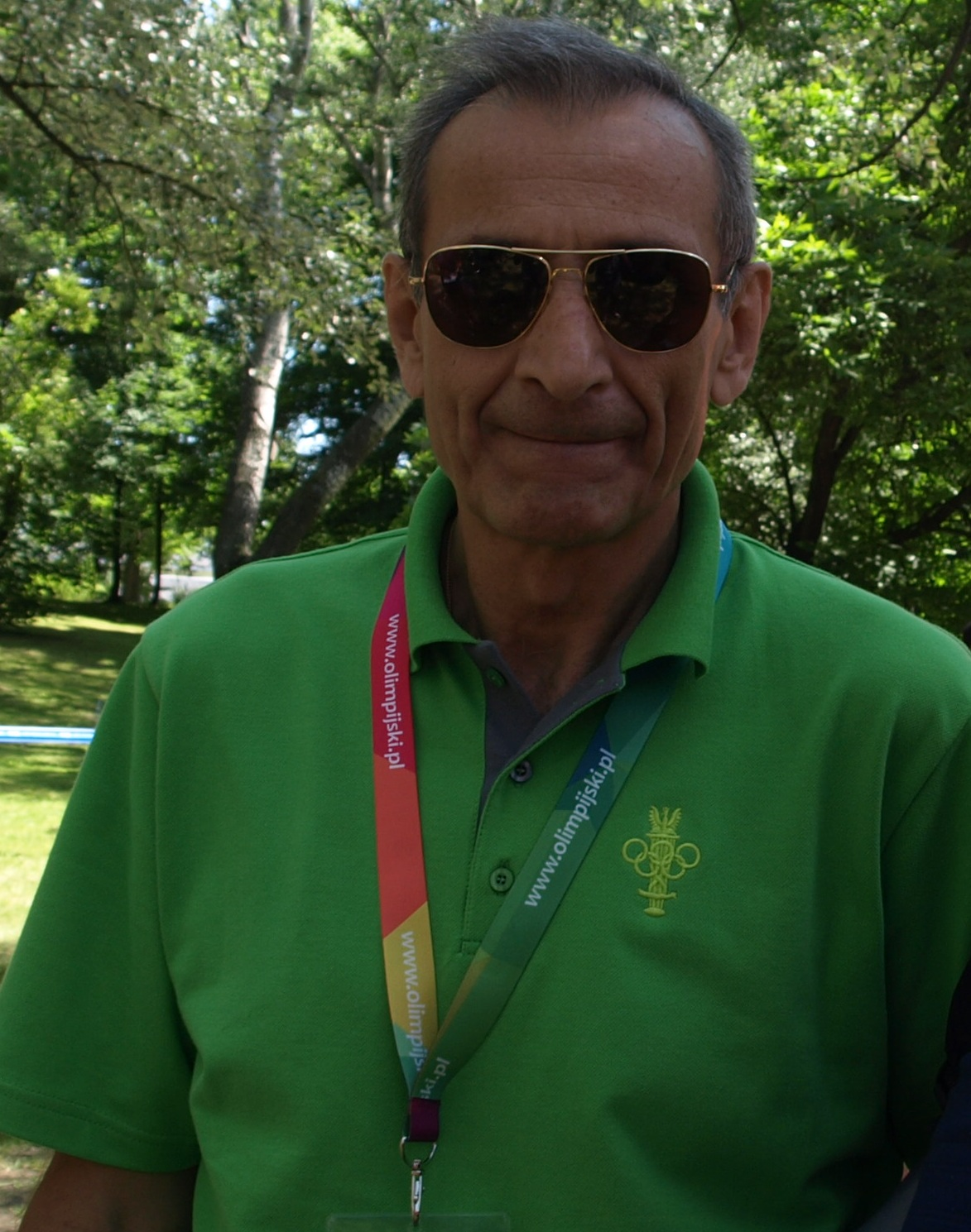

Personal information
- Born: 4 February 1952 (age 74) Lublin, Poland

Sport
- Sport: Fencing
Medal record
Men's fencing
Representing Poland
Olympic Games
Gold medal – first place	1972 Munich	Foil, team

Arkadiusz Godel (born 4 February 1952) is a Polish former fencer. He won a gold medal in the team foil event at the 1972 Summer Olympics.
