= Shiro Maruyama =

Japanese fencer

Personal information
- Born: 17 November 1948 (age 77)

Sport
- Sport: Fencing

Shiro Maruyama (圓山 詩郎, Maruyama Shirō; born 17 November 1948) is a Japanese fencer. He competed in the team foil event at the 1972 Summer Olympics.
