= Gábor Füredi =

Hungarian fencer

Personal information
- Born: 2 August 1944 (age 82) Budapest, Kingdom of Hungary

Sport
- Sport: Fencing

Gábor Füredi (born 2 August 1944) is a Hungarian fencer. He competed in the team foil event at the 1968 Summer Olympics.
