= Bülent Erdem =

Turkish fencer (born 1947)

Personal information
- Born: 1947 (age 78–79) Mersin, Turkey

Sport
- Sport: Fencing

Bülent Erdem (born 1947) is a Turkish fencer. He competed in the individual foil event at the 1972 Summer Olympics.

Erdem was born in Mersin in 1947. He won a silver medal in the Balkan Competition in 1977.
