= Leszek Martewicz =

Polish fencer

Personal information
- Born: 4 January 1955 (age 71) Gdańsk, Poland

Sport
- Sport: Fencing

Leszek Martewicz (born 4 January 1955) is a Polish fencer. He competed in the team foil event at the 1976 Summer Olympics.
