= 1971 World Fencing Championships =

International fencing competition

1971 World Championships in Fencing
- Host city: Vienna, Austria

The 1971 World Fencing Championships were held in Vienna, Austria. The event took place from July 4 to July 17, 1971.

== Medal table ==
Rank	Nation	Gold	Silver	Bronze	Total
1	Soviet Union (URS)	4	1	3	8
2	France (FRA)	2	0	0	2
3	Hungary (HUN)	1	3	0	4
4	Italy (ITA)	1	1	1	3
5	Poland (POL)	0	3	1	4
6	Sweden (SWE)	0	0	2	2
7	Romania (ROU)	0	0	1	1
Totals (7 entries)		8	8	8	24

== Medal summary ==
=== Men's events ===
Event	Gold	Silver	Bronze
Individual Foil	(Soviet Union) Vasyl Stankovych	(Polish People's Republic) Marek Dąbrowski	(Soviet Union) Leonid Romanov
Team Foil	France	(Polish People's Republic) Poland	Soviet Union
Individual Sabre	(Italy) Michele Maffei	(Polish People's Republic) Jerzy Pawłowski	(Soviet Union) Viktor Sidyak
Team Sabre	Soviet Union	(Hungarian People's Republic) Hungary	Italy
Individual Épée	(Soviet Union) Grigory Kriss	(Italy) Nicola Granieri	(Sweden) Rolf Edling
Team Épée	(Hungarian People's Republic) Hungary	Soviet Union	Sweden

=== Women's events ===
Event	Gold	Silver	Bronze
Individual Foil	(France) Marie-Chantal Depetris-Demaille	(Hungarian People's Republic) Ildikó Újlaky-Rejtő	(Socialist Republic of Romania) Ana Derșidan-Ene-Pascu
Team Foil	Soviet Union	(Hungarian People's Republic) Hungary	(Polish People's Republic) Poland
