= Göran Malkar =

Swedish fencer

Personal information
- Nationality: Swedish
- Born: 7 April 1954 (age 72) Västerbotten, Sweden

Sport
- Sport: Fencing

Göran Malkar (born 7 April 1954) is a Swedish fencer. He competed in the individual foil event at the 1976 Summer Olympics and the team épée event at the 1980 Summer Olympics.
