= Ian Single =

British fencer

Personal information
- Born: 7 April 1947 (age 79) Dartford, England

Sport
- Sport: Fencing

Ian Single (born 7 April 1947) is a British fencer. He competed in the team foil event at the 1972 Summer Olympics.
