= Lehel Fekete =

Canadian fencer

Personal information
- Born: 31 January 1957 (age 69) Ottawa, Ontario, Canada

Sport
- Sport: Fencing

Lehel Fekete (born 31 January 1957) is a Canadian fencer. He competed in the individual foil event at the 1976 Summer Olympics.
