= Petrică Buricea =

Romanian fencer

Personal information
- Born: 1 March 1955 (age 71)

Sport
- Sport: Fencing

Petrică Buricea (born 1 March 1955) is a Romanian fencer. He competed in the team foil event at the 1976 Summer Olympics.
