= István Marton (fencer) =

Hungarian fencer

Personal information
- Born: 15 November 1944 (age 81) Keszthely, Hungary

Sport
- Sport: Fencing

István Marton (born 15 November 1944) is a Hungarian Olympic fencer. He competed in the team foil event at the 1972 Summer Olympics.
