= Jesús Gil (fencer) =

Cuban fencer (born 1951)

Personal information
- Born: 5 September 1951 (age 74) Havana, Cuba

Sport
- Sport: Fencing

Jesús Gil (born 5 September 1951) is a Cuban fencer. He competed in the individual and team foil events at the 1968 and 1972 Summer Olympics.
