= Edward Ballinger =

American fencer

Personal information
- Full name: Edward Ballinger
- Nickname: Ed Ballinger
- Born: Edward Pennington Ballinger; October 25, 1951 (age 74) New York, New York, United States

Sport
- Country: United States
- Sport: Fencing
- Events: Men's Foil and Men's Epee, Individual and Team
- Now coaching: 1980, 1983-1984 Head Fencing Coach, Baruch University, NYC

Achievements and titles
- Olympic finals: 1976 Summer Olympics
- World finals
- National finals

Edward Ballinger (born October 25, 1951) is an American fencer. He competed in the individual and team foil events at the 1976 Summer Olympics. He is married to Sally Pechinsky. He is retired from coaching at the Boston Fencing Club. He was elected for induction into the USFA Hall of Fame in the summer of 2012.

== See also ==
- List of USFA Division I National Champions
- List of USFA Hall of Fame members
