= Tudor Petruș =

Romanian fencer

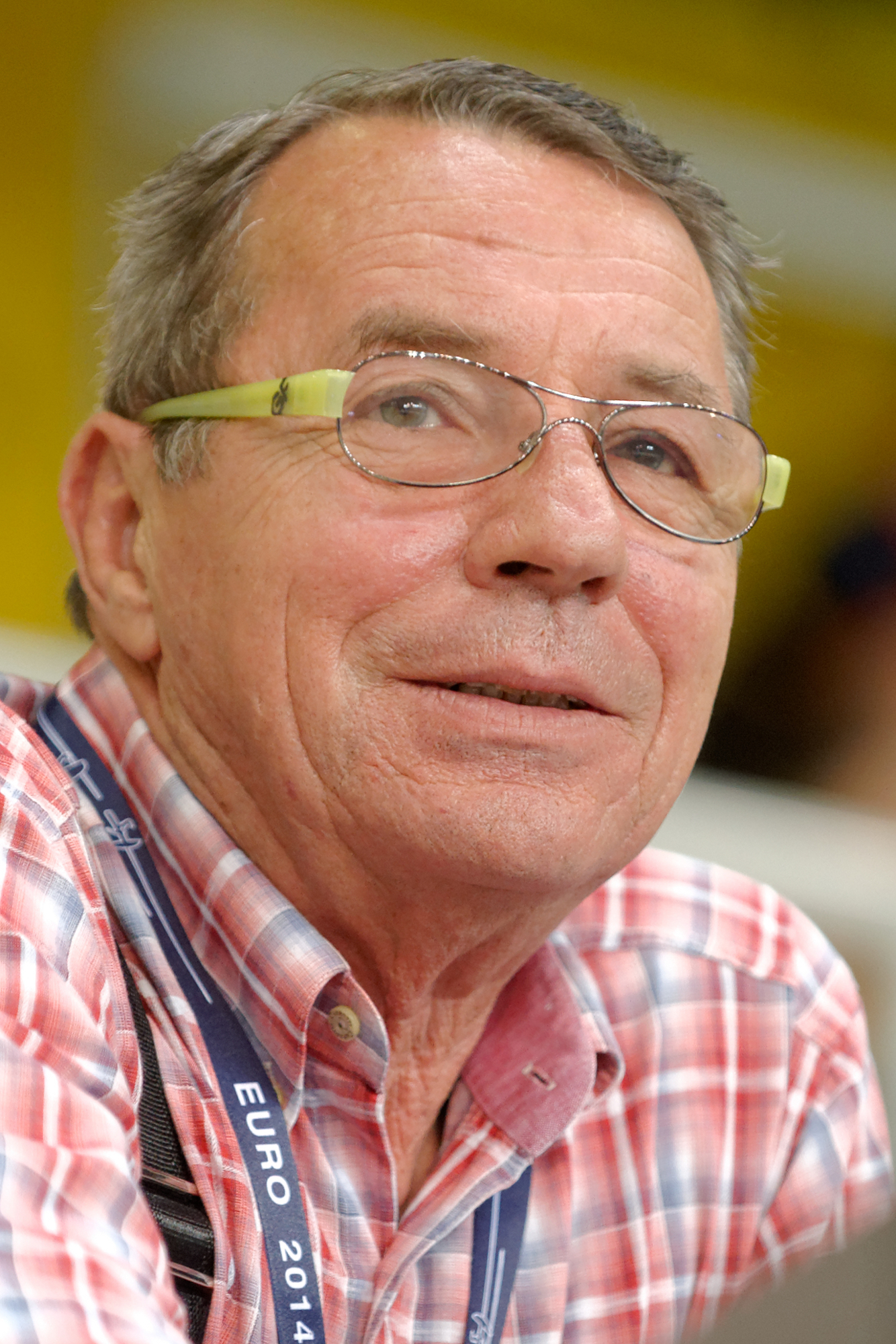
- Petruș in 2014

Personal information
- Born: 2 October 1949 Cluj-Napoca, Romania
- Died: 12 September 2017 (aged 67)

Sport
- Sport: Fencing

Tudor Petruș (2 October 1949 – 12 September 2017) was a Romanian fencer. He competed in the individual and team foil events at the 1976 and 1980 Summer Olympics.
