= Martin Lang (fencer) =

American fencer (born 1949)

Personal information
- Born: May 20, 1949 (age 77) Jersey City, New Jersey, U.S.
- Height: 6 ft 0 in (183 cm)
- Weight: 165 lb (75 kg)

Sport
- Country: USA
- Sport: Fencing
- Event: Foil
- College team: New York University
- Club: Music City Fencing Club

Achievements and titles
- Olympic finals: 1976 Olympic Fencing Team
- Regional finals: 1975 Pan American Foil Champion
- National finals: 1978 US Foil Champion

Martin Lang (born May 20, 1949) is an American former foil fencer.

== Early and personal life ==
Lang was born in Jersey City, New Jersey, later lived in Glen Oaks, Queens, New York, and is Jewish. He attended Martin Van Buren High School in Queens, along with Steve Kaplan who also became an Olympic fencer. After graduating from NYU with a Bachelor of Science degree, he attended New York University for graduate studies.

He worked 22 years in the hotel industry, and ten years in the automotive industry. Lang lives in Spring Hill, Tennessee. He owns his own club in Nashville, Tennessee.

== Fencing career ==
Lang fenced foil for New York University (class of 1972), where he attended the School of Education, and was 25‐3 for the season and finished second in the IFA foil competition in 1970–71. He was co-captain of the team in 1971–72, and was an NCAA First Team All American in 1972. He was 55–5 in his NYU career. He then fenced for Salle Santelli and for the New York Athletic Club.

At the 1975 Pan American Games in Mexico City, Lang won the individual Foil Championship (the first American in 20 years to win a gold medal at the Pan American Games in foil), and also won a team foil silver medal.

Lang competed in the individual and team foil events at the 1976 Summer Olympics in Montreal, at 27 years of age.

He won the U.S. National Foil Championship in 1978, and Lang was a five-time U.S. National Men's Foil Team Champion. Lang was inducted into the NYU Hall of Fame in 2012.

== See also ==
- List of USFA Division I National Champions
- List of USFA Hall of Fame members
