= József Komatits =

Hungarian fencer

Personal information
- Born: 6 November 1950 Szombathely, Hungary
- Died: 19 June 2007 (aged 56)

Sport
- Sport: Fencing

József Komatits (6 November 1950 – 19 June 2007) was a Hungarian foil fencer. He competed in the individual and team foil events at the 1976 Summer Olympics.
