= Vasyl Stankovych =

Ukrainian fencer

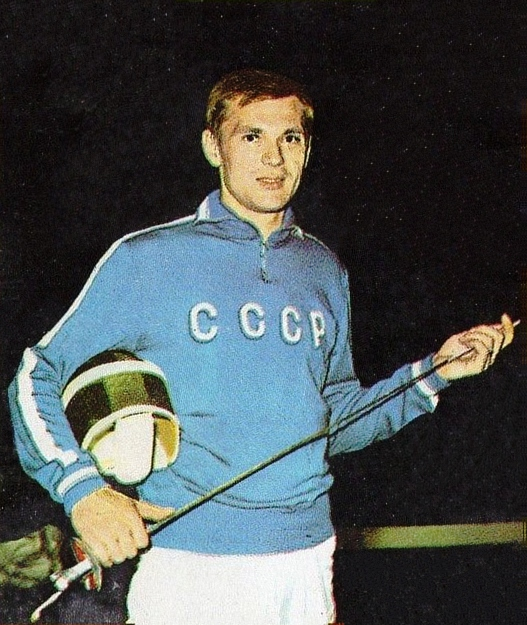
- Stankovych in 1972

Personal information
- Born: 25 April 1946 (age 80) Irshava, Soviet Union

Sport
- Sport: Fencing
- Event(s): Épée, foil
- Club: Burevestnik Lviv
Medal record
Representing Soviet Union
Olympic Games
Silver medal – second place	1968 Mexico City	Team foil
Silver medal – second place	1972 Munich	Team foil
World Championships
Gold medal – first place	1969 Havana	Team foil
Gold medal – first place	1970 Ankara	Team foil
Gold medal – first place	1971 Vienna	Individual foil
Gold medal – first place	1973 Gothenburg	Team foil
Gold medal – first place	1974 Grenoble	Team foil
Silver medal – second place	1969 Havana	Individual foil
Bronze medal – third place	1971 Vienna	Team foil
Summer Universiade
Gold medal – first place	1970 Turin	Team foil
Gold medal – first place	1973 Moscow	Individual foil
Gold medal – first place	1973 Moscow	Team foil
Silver medal – second place	1970 Turin	Individual foil

Vasyl Stankovych (Ukrainian: Василь Васильович Станкович, Russian: Василий Васильевич Станкович; born 25 April 1946) is a retired Ukrainian fencer. He competed at the 1968, 1972 and 1976 Olympics and won team silver medals in the foil in 1968 and 1972; in 1976 he placed fourth both individually and with the Soviet team. At the world championships Stankovych won five gold medals in the foil between 1969 and 1974.
