= Carl Borack =

American fencer (born 1947)

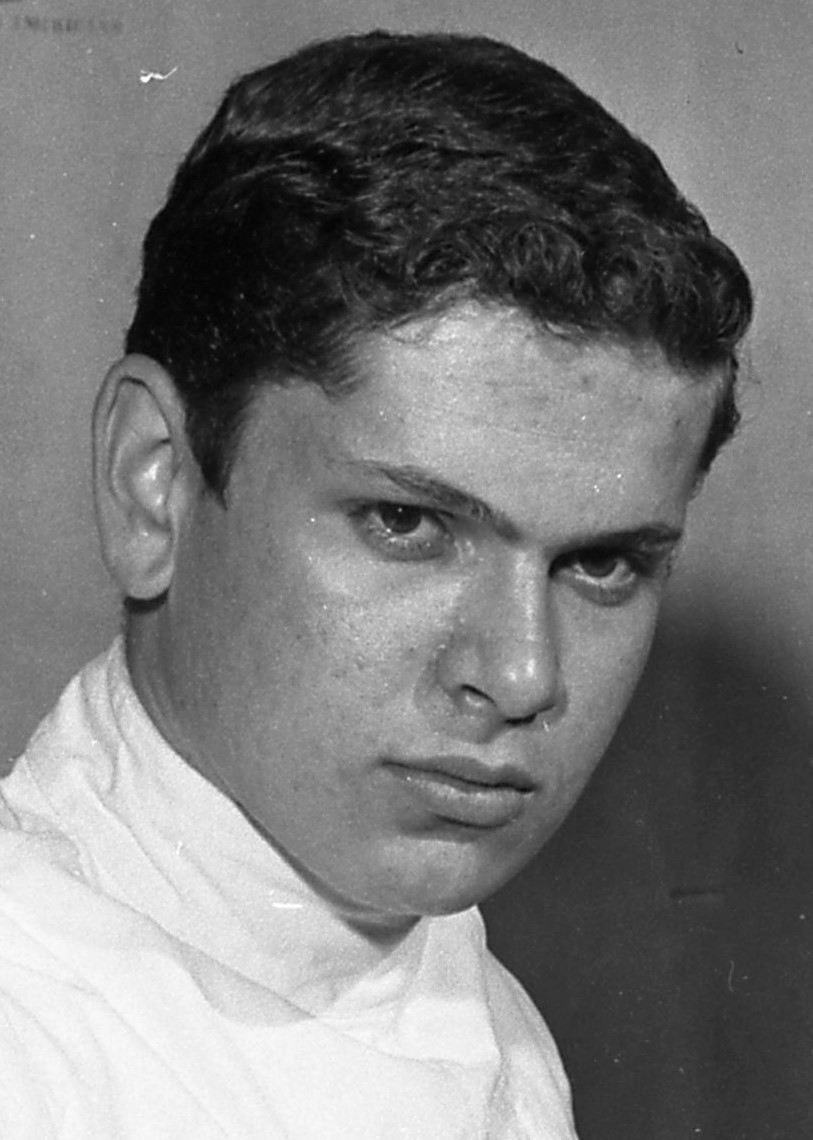
- Borack in 1965

Personal information
- Born: July 12, 1947 (age 78) Staten Island, New York, United States

Sport
- Sport: Fencing

Carl Borack (born July 12, 1947) is an American former fencer. He competed in the individual and team foil events at the 1972 Summer Olympics. He won a gold medal in epee at the 1967 Pan American Games. In 1969 he won the US national foil championship, and in Israel the 1969 Maccabiah Games sabre championship. He won a gold medal in foil at the 1971 Pan American Games. He is Jewish, and in 1990 he was inducted into the Southern California Jewish Sports Hall of Fame.

He is also a producer, photographer with works on display with the Art of the Olympians.

== See also ==
- List of USFA Division I National Champions
- List of USFA Hall of Fame members
