= Fawzi Merhi =

Lebanese fencer (born 1950)

Personal information
- Born: 20 June 1950 (age 76)

Sport
- Sport: Fencing

Fawzi Merhi (Arabic: فوزي مرعي; born 20 June 1950) is a Lebanese épée, foil and sabre fencer. He represented Lebanon in international competitions, notably competing in four events at the 1972 Summer Olympics.
