= Ng Wing Biu =

Hong Kong fencer

Personal information
- Born: 13 October 1944 (age 81)

Sport
- Sport: Fencing

Ng Wing Biu (born 13 October 1944) is a former épée and foil fencer from Hong Kong. He competed in three events at the 1976 Summer Olympics in Montreal, Canada.
