= Noriyuki Sato =

Japanese fencer

Personal information
- Born: 21 November 1953 (age 72)

Sport
- Sport: Fencing

Noriyuki Sato (佐藤 範幸, Satō Noriyuki; born 21 November 1953) is a Japanese fencer. He competed in the individual and team foil events at the 1976 Summer Olympics.
