= Carlo Montano =

Italian fencer (born 1952)

Personal information
- Born: 25 September 1952 (age 74) Livorno, Italy

Sport
- Sport: Fencing
Medal record
Men's fencing
Representing Italy
Olympic Games
Silver medal – second place	1976 Montréal	Foil, team
Mediterranean Games
Gold medal – first place	1971 Izmir	Individual foil
Silver medal – second place	1975 Algiers	Individual foil

Carlo Montano (born 25 September 1952) is an Italian fencer. He won a silver medal in the team foil event at the 1976 Summer Olympics. He won an individual silver in the 1974 World Fencing Championships, bronze in the team event in 1975, individual bronze and team silver in 1977, team silver in 1979 and 1981 and finally team bronze in 1982. He also competed at the Mediterranean Games in the individual foil event winning a gold medal in 1971 and a silver medal in 1975.

Coming from a long family tradition of fencing, he is the nephew of Aldo Montano, cousin of Mario Tullio Montano, Tommaso Montano and Mario Aldo Montano and uncle of Aldo Montano, Carlo is the only foilist in the family.

Carlo has been one of the last foilits to fence with an Italian grip in a world-level competition.

In 2013 he was elected president of Circolo Scherma Fides, the club where all the Montano family fenced.
