= Ziemowit Wojciechowski =

Polish fencer (born 1948)

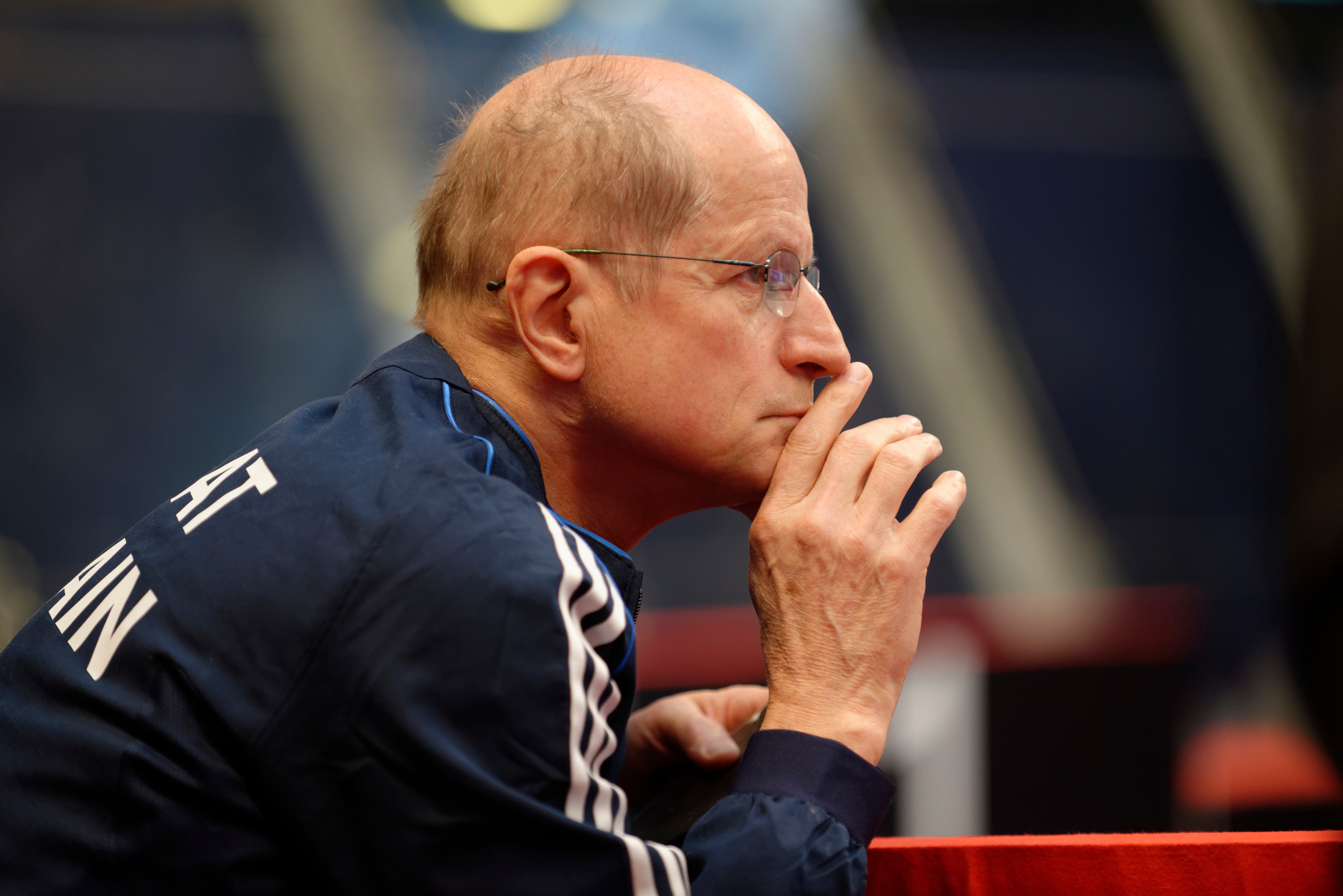
- At the 2014 Challenge International de Paris

Personal information
- Full name: Ziemowit Franciszek Wojciechowski
- Born: 3 October 1948 (age 77) Gdańsk, Poland
- Website: http://zfw-fencing.co.uk

Fencing career
- Sport: Fencing
- Weapon: Foil

Ziemowit Wojciechowski (born 3 October 1948) is a Polish former fencer. He is more commonly known as Ziemek. He competed in the individual and team foil events at the 1976 Summer Olympics. He was married to British Olympic fencer Susan Wrigglesworth. He now coaches Great Britain's foil team, he is also the coach of fencer Richard Kruse. He is also a coach for his fencing club, ZFW, in London.

== Biography ==
Ziemek started fencing when he was 12 years old, inspired by his father and a TV series about King Arthur and the Knights of the Round Table. The coach that had the greatest influence on him was Zbigniew Skrudlik (the Polish national fencing coach) at AZS Warsaw. Ziemek went on to become the Polish foil champion 11 times, won two silver medals in the World Student Games, came fourth in the 1974 world championship and won a silver medal in the team event, then won the Bologna A-grade (now Venice) in 1975 and the 1976 pre-Olympic tournament when he reached No. 3 in the world.
