= Edward Donofrio =

American fencer (born 1951)

Personal information
- Full name: Edward Joseph Donofrio
- Born: September 1, 1951 (age 74) Brooklyn, New York, U.S.
- Height: 6 ft 2 in (1.88 m)
- Weight: 175 lb (79 kg)

Sport
- Sport: Fencing
- College team: US Naval Academy, 1973 US Naval Academy Athletic Hall of Fame 1972 NCAA All American Fencing Team

Achievements and titles
- Olympic finals: 1976 Olympic Team
- National finals: 1976 US Foil Champion 1974 US Foil Team Champion, US Marine Corps

Edward Joseph Donofrio (born September 1, 1951) is an American fencer. Born in Brooklyn, New York, he competed in the individual and team foil events at the 1976 Summer Olympics. USA Fencing Hall of Fame Class of 2023.
