= Rob Bruniges =

British fencer (1956–2023)

Personal information
- Born: 3 August 1956 London, England
- Died: 6 February 2023 (aged 66)

Sport
- Sport: Fencing

Robert John Bruniges (3 August 1956 – 6 February 2023) was a British fencer and three weapon qualified coach. He became world junior foil champion in 1976 and competed at the 1976, 1980 and 1984 Summer Olympics. In 1981, he won the foil title at the British Fencing Championships.

Bruniges was educated at Millfield School. He died in February 2023, at the age of 66.
