= Hossein Niknam =

Iranian fencer

Personal information
- Born: 29 May 1951 (age 75) Tehran, Iran

Sport
- Sport: Fencing

Hossein Niknam (Persian: حسین نیکنام; born 29 May 1951) is an Iranian fencer. He competed in the individual and team foil events at the 1976 Summer Olympics.
