= Kiyoshi Uehara =

Japanese fencer

Personal information
- Born: 6 October 1948 (age 77)

Sport
- Sport: Fencing

Kiyoshi Uehara (植原 清, Uehara Kiyoshi; born 6 October 1948) is a Japanese fencer. He competed in the individual and team foil events at the 1972 Summer Olympics.
