= Hiroshi Nakajima (fencer) =

Japanese fencer

Personal information
- Born: 21 September 1943 (age 82)

Sport
- Sport: Fencing

Hiroshi Nakajima (中嶋 寛, Hiroshi Nakajima; born 21 September 1943) is a Japanese fencer. He competed in the individual and team foil events at the 1972 Summer Olympics.
