= Masanori Kawatsu =

Japanese fencer

Personal information
- Born: 3 July 1948 (age 78)

Sport
- Sport: Fencing

Masanori Kawatsu (川津 正徳, Kawatsu Masanori; born 3 July 1948) is a Japanese fencer. He competed in the individual and team foil events at the 1976 Summer Olympics.
