= Marek Dąbrowski =

Polish fencer (born 1949)

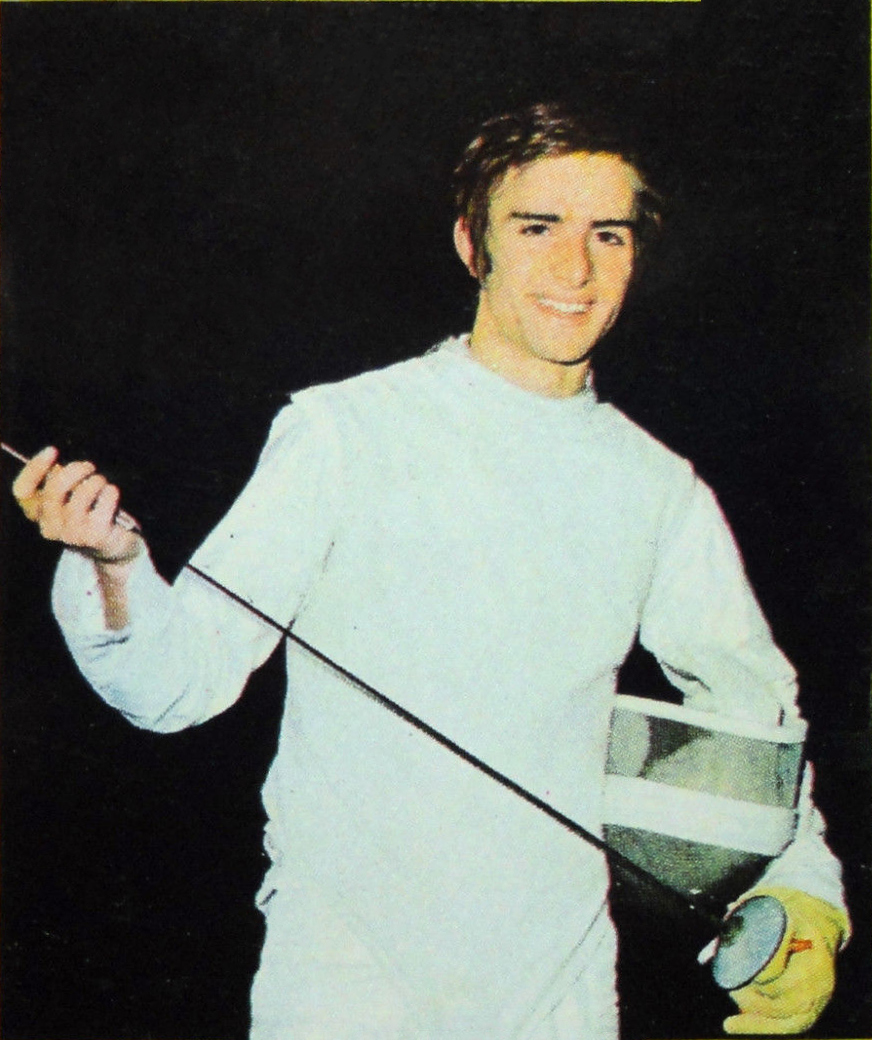

Personal information
- Born: 28 November 1949 (age 76) Gliwice, Poland
- Height: 175 cm (5 ft 9 in)
- Weight: 64 kg (141 lb)

Sport
- Sport: Fencing
- Event: Foil
- Club: Piast Gliwice; AZS Warszawa
Medal record
Representing Poland
Olympic Games
Gold medal – first place	1972 Munich	Team foil
World Championships
Silver medal – second place	1969 Havana	Team foil
Silver medal – second place	1971 Vienna	Team foil
Silver medal – second place	1971 Vienna	Individual foil
Silver medal – second place	1974 Grenoble	Team foil
Bronze medal – third place	1970 Ankara	Individual foil
Bronze medal – third place	1973 Gothenburg	Team foil
Summer Universiade
Silver medal – second place	1970 Turin	Team foil
Silver medal – second place	1973 Moscow	Team foil
Bronze medal – third place	1970 Turin	Individual foil

Marek Roman Dąbrowski (born 28 November 1949) is a retired Polish foil fencer. He competed at the 1972 and 1976 Olympics and won a team gold medal in 1972, placing sixth individually. Between 1969 and 1974 he won six medals at the world championships.
