= František Koukal =

Czech fencer (born 1949)

Personal information
- Born: 11 April 1949 (age 77) Prague, Czechoslovakia (now Czech Republic)

Sport
- Sport: Fencing

František Koukal (born 11 April 1949) is a Czech fencer. He competed in the individual foil events at the 1972, 1976 and 1980 Summer Olympics.
