= Joseph Freeman (fencer) =

American fencer

Personal information
- Born: July 18, 1948 (age 78) Philadelphia, Pennsylvania, United States

Sport
- Sport: Fencing

Joseph Freeman (born July 18, 1948) is an American fencer. He competed in the individual and team foil events at the 1972 Summer Olympics.
