= Stefano Simoncelli =

Italian fencer (1946–2013)

Personal information
- Born: 12 November 1946 Grottaferrata, Rome, Italy
- Died: 20 March 2013 (aged 66) Rome, Italy

Sport
- Sport: Fencing
Medal record
Men's fencing
Representing Italy
Olympic Games
Silver medal – second place	1976 Montréal	Team foil
World Championships
Bronze medal – third place	1975 Budapest	Team foil
Summer Universiade
Bronze medal – third place	1973 Moscow	Individual foil

Stefano Simoncelli (12 November 1946 – 20 March 2013) was an Italian fencer. He won a silver medal in the team foil event at the 1976 Summer Olympics.

He was later a teacher in Frascati Scherma. He became vice president of Federazione Italiana Scherma.
