= Harald Hein =

German fencer (1950–2008)

Personal information
- Born: 19 April 1950 Tauberbischofsheim, West Germany
- Died: 20 May 2008 (aged 58) Tauberbischofsheim, Germany

Sport
- Sport: Fencing
Medal record
Men's fencing
Representing West Germany
Olympic Games
Gold medal – first place	1976 Montréal	Foil, team
Silver medal – second place	1984 Los Angeles	Foil, team

Harald Hein (19 April 1950 – 20 May 2008) was a German foil fencer. He won a gold medal in the team event at the 1976 and a silver in the same event at the 1984 Summer Olympics.

== Biography ==
Harald Hein attended the Kaufmännische Schule Tauberbischofsheim and fought for the Fencing-Club Tauberbischofsheim.
