= Ichiro Serizawa =

Japanese fencer

Personal information
- Born: 10 March 1945 (age 81)

Sport
- Sport: Fencing

Ichiro Serizawa (芹沢 一郎, Serizawa Ichirō; born 10 March 1945) is a Japanese fencer. He competed in the individual and team foil events at the 1972 Summer Olympics.
