= John Nonna =

American fencer

John Michael Nonna
Personal information
- Born: July 8, 1948 (age 78) New York, New York, United States

Sport
- Sport: Fencing
- College team: Princeton University

John Michael Nonna (born July 8, 1948) is an American fencer and attorney. He currently serves as the Westchester County Attorney.

== Biography ==
Nonna was born on July 8, 1948. He attended Regis High School in Manhattan, graduating in 1966. Nonna received his bachelor's degree from Princeton University in 1970.

He competed in the individual and team foil events at the 1972 Summer Olympics. Nonna also qualified for the 1980 Olympic team but did not compete due to the Olympic Committee's boycott of the 1980 Summer Olympics in Moscow, Russia. He was one of 461 athletes to receive a Congressional Gold Medal instead.

He later became an attorney specializing in insurance law. He was mayor of Pleasantville, New York, from 1995 to 2003. He became a member of the Westchester County Board of Legislators.
