= Toshio Jingu =

Japanese fencer (born 1948)

Personal information
- Born: 11 June 1948 (age 78) Gunma Prefecture, Japan

Sport
- Sport: Fencing

Toshio Jingu (神宮 敏男, Jingū Toshio; born 11 June 1948) is a Japanese fencer. He competed in the individual and team foil events at the 1976 Summer Olympics.
