= Friedrich Wessel =

German fencer (born 1945)

Personal information
- Born: 29 April 1945 (age 81) Bonn, Nazi Germany

Sport
- Sport: Fencing

Friedrich Wessel (born 29 April 1945) is a German fencer. He competed in the individual and team foil events at the 1968 and 1972 Summer Olympics.
