= Vladimir Denisov (fencer) =

Soviet fencer (born 1947)

Personal information
- Born: 22 May 1947 (age 79) Nizhny Novgorod, Russian SFSR, Soviet Union

Sport
- Sport: Fencing
Medal record
Men's fencing
Representing Soviet Union
Olympic Games
Silver medal – second place	1972 Munich	Foil, team

Vladimir Denisov (Russian: Владимир Геннадьевич Денисов; born 22 May 1947) is a Soviet fencer. He won a silver medal in the team foil event at the 1972 Summer Olympics.
