= Bernard Talvard =

French fencer (born 1947)

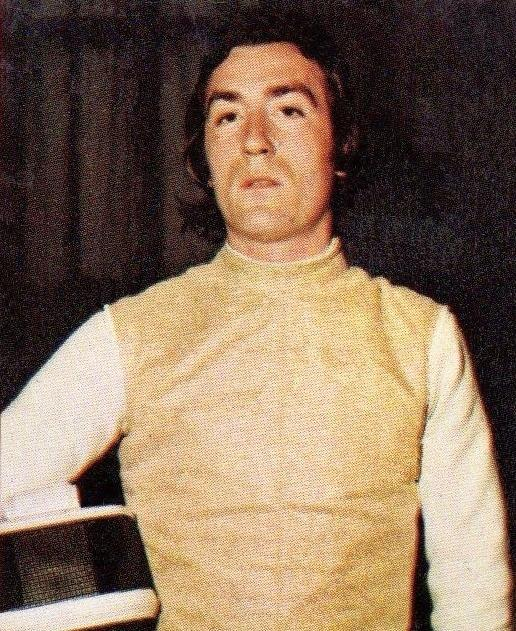

Personal information
- Born: 8 October 1947 (age 78) Melun, France

Sport
- Sport: Fencing
Medal record
Men's fencing
Representing France
Olympic Games
Bronze medal – third place	1972 Munich	Team foil
Bronze medal – third place	1976 Montréal	Individual Foil
Bronze medal – third place	1976 Montréal	Team foil
Mediterranean Games
Gold medal – first place	1975 Algiers	Individual foil

Bernard Talvard (born 8 October 1947) is a French fencer. He won three bronze medals in the foil events at the 1972 and 1976 Summer Olympics and a gold medal at the 1975 Mediterranean Games in the individual foil event.
