= Klaus Reichert =

German fencer

Personal information
- Born: 3 June 1947 (age 79) Hanau, Germany

Sport
- Sport: Fencing
Medal record
Men's fencing
Representing West Germany
Olympic Games
Gold medal – first place	1976 Montréal	Foil, team
Silver medal – second place	1984 Los Angeles	Foil, team

Klaus Reichert (born 3 June 1947) is a German fencer. He won a gold medal in the team foil event at the 1976 Summer Olympics and a silver in the same event at the 1984 Summer Olympics.
