= Eduardo Jhons =

Cuban fencer (born 1950)

Personal information
- Born: 4 December 1950 (age 75)

Sport
- Sport: Fencing

Eduardo Jhons (born 4 December 1950) is a Cuban foil fencer. He competed at the 1968, 1972 and 1976 Summer Olympics.
