= Jorge Garbey (fencer) =

Cuban fencer (born 1953)

Personal information
- Born: 27 March 1953
- Died: 5 October 2002 (aged 49)

Sport
- Sport: Fencing

Jorge Garbey (27 March 1953 – 5 October 2002) was a Cuban fencer. He competed at the 1972 and 1976 Summer Olympics.
