= Enrique Salvat =

Cuban fencer

Personal information
- Born: 6 May 1950 (age 76)

Sport
- Sport: Fencing

Enrique Salvat (born 6 May 1950) is a Cuban fencer. He competed in the individual and team foil events at the 1972 and 1976 Summer Olympics.
