= Christian Noël =

French fencer (born 1945)

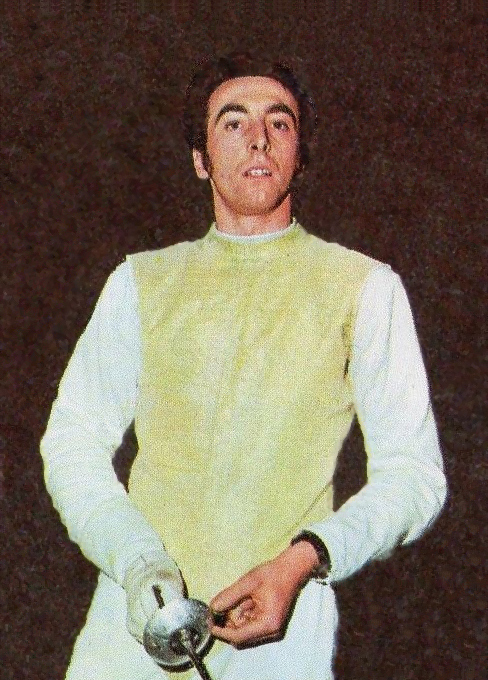
- Christian Noël in 1972

Personal information
- Born: 13 March 1945 (age 81) Agen, France
- Height: 1.85 m (6 ft 1 in)
- Weight: 77 kg (170 lb)

Sport
- Sport: Fencing
Medal record
Representing France
Olympic Games
| Gold medal – first place | 1968 Mexico City | Team foil |
| Bronze medal – third place | 1964 Tokyo | Team foil |
| Bronze medal – third place | 1972 Munich | Individual foil |
| Bronze medal – third place | Munich 1972 | Team foil |
| Bronze medal – third place | 1976 Montreal | Team foil |
Mediterranean Games
| Silver medal – second place | 1967 Tunis | Individual foil |
| Silver medal – second place | 1971 Izmir | Individual foil |

Christian Noël (born 13 March 1945) is a retired French foil fencer, and medalists in four consecutive Olympics, from 1964 to 1976. He also competed at the Mediterranean Games in 1967 and 1971 and won silver medals in the individual foil events in both years.
