= List of people from Caracas =

== A ==
- Albi De Abreu (born 1975), actor
- José Acevedo (born 1986), athlete
- Roy Altman (born 1982), judge of the U.S. District Court for the Southern District of Florida, lawyer, and author
- César Amaris (born 1989), rower
- Rafael Arnal (1915–2011), Olympic sports shooter
- Marlene de Andrade (born 1977), actress
- Omar Atlas (born 1938), professional wrestler
- Daniela Alvarado (born 1981), popular actress starred as Maria Eugenia Sampedro "Mariú"/ Maria Cristina Vicario in Mariú
- Gustavo Ávila (born 1938), retired jockey in Thoroughbred horse racing
- Nohely Arteaga (born 1963), actress
- Armando Azócar (born 1958), athlete

== B ==
- Cesar Baena (born 1986), cross-country skier and former Guinness World Record holder.
- Norkys Batista (born 1977), actress, model.
- Jesús Bandrés (born 1991), professional tennis player.
- Juan Alfonso Baptista (born 1976), actor and model.
- Carlos Barreto (1976–1999), bantamweight boxer.
- Ysis Barreto (born 1980), judoka.
- Armando Becker (born 1966), basketball player.
- Andrés Bello (1781–1865), humanist, diplomat, poet, legislator, philosopher, educator and philologist.
- Baruj Benacerraf (1920–2011), shared the 1980 Nobel Prize in Physiology.
- Alejandra Benítez (born 1980), sabre fencer.
- Bob Bissonnette (1981–2016), ice hockey player.
- José Rafael Briceño (born 1970), stand-up comedian.
- Alfonso Blanco (born 1986), professional boxer.
- Gregor Blanco (born 1983), professional baseball outfielder.
- Marvin Blanco (born 1988), athlete.
- Serge Blanco (born 1958), rugby union footballer.
- Manuel Blum (born 1938), computer scientist.
- Iginia Boccalandro (born 1961), athlete.
- Simón Bolívar (1783–1830), father of independence in South America.
- Chantal Baudaux (born 1980), ex actress, Socialite.
- Jacobo Borges (born 1931), contemporary, neo-figurative Latin-American artist.
- Carlos Bravo (born 1973), fencer.

== C ==
- Sergio Camacho (born 1973), judoka.
- Crisol Carabal (born 1969), telenovela actress.
- Nelson Canache Jr. (born 1978), auto racing driver.
- Hersony Canelón (born 1988), professional track and road cyclist.
- Caridad Canelón (born 1955), veteran telenovela actress.
- Carlos Cruz (born 1960), actor.
- Carlos Cañizales (born 1993), professional boxer.
- Alfonso Carrasquel (1926–2005), professional baseball player, coach, scout and manager.
- Teresa Carreño (1853–1917), pianist, soprano, composer, and conductor.
- Martín Carrillo (born 1983), football manager.
- Fernando Carrillo (born 1970), actor, model, singer.
- Johnny Cecotto (born 1956), professional Grand Prix motorcycle racer and auto racer.
- Freddy Cedeño (born 1981), volleyball player.
- Judith Chacón (1986–2009), weightlifter.
- Rick Chartraw (born 1954), professional ice hockey defenseman.
- Julian Chela-Flores (born 1942), astrobiologist and physicist.
- Arsenio Chirinos (1934–2015), cyclist.
- Víctor Chirinos (born 1941), cyclist.
- Néstor Colmenares (born 1987), professional basketball player.
- Jacinto Convit (1913–2014), physician and scientist.
- Carlos Coste (born 1976), professional free diver.
- Carlos Crassus (1920–1984), sports shooter.
- Mauro Libi Crestani, business
- Francisco José Cróquer (1920–1955), sportscaster specialized in baseball and boxing.
- Carlos Cruz-Diez (1923–2019), visual artist.
- Eliana Cuevas, jazz singer, whose music blends jazz with Latin music.

== D ==
- Danny Ocean (born 1992), singer, songwriter and record producer.
- Miguel de León (born 1962), actor
- Marielena Davila (born 1992), actress and singer.
- Majandra Delfino (born 1981), actress and singer.
- Carlos Delgado Chalbaud (1909–1950), military officer.
- Daniel Dhers (born 1985), professional BMX rider.
- Antonio Díaz (born 1980), karateka.
- Oscar D'León (born 1943), musician and bassist best known for his work with salsa music.
- Franco de Vita (born 1954), singer, pianist and composer
- Ramon Domínguez (born 1976), champion jockey and Hall of Fame member in American thoroughbred horse racing.
- Kimberly Dos Ramos (born 1992), actress.
- Milka Duno (born 1972), race car driver.
- Rafael Duran (born 1938), wrestler.

== E ==
- José Echenique (born 1965), basketball player.
- Daniel Elbittar (born 1979), actor, model and singer.
- Alexander Espinoza (born 1980), bantamweight boxer.
- Edgar Espinoza (born 1928), sports shooter.
- Unai Etxebarria (born 1972), road racing cyclist.
- Gaby Espino (born 1977), actress.

== F ==
- Alessandro Famularo (born 2003), racing driver.
- Sebastián Fernández (born 2000), racing driver.
- Silvio Fernández (fencer born 1946) (born 1946), fencer.
- Silvio Fernández (fencer born 1979) (born 1979), épée fencer.
- Sandro Finoglio (born 1973), actor, model.
- Stefanía Fernández (born 1990), journalist, model and beauty queen who won the Miss Venezuela 2008 and Miss Universe 2009 titles.
- José Manuel Flores Sánchez (born 1986), model, Mister Venezuela 2009.
- Tony Franco (born 1981), football manager.
- Ramón Fumadó (born 1981), diver.

== G ==
- Germán Gabriel (born 1980), professional basketball player
- Raúl Gorrín (born 1968), businessman, president ceo of Globovision.
- Andrés Galarraga (born 1961), professional baseball player
- Anaida Galindo (born 1987), political staffer, online magazine publisher, and the wife of Conservative Party of Canada leader Pierre Poilievre
- Rómulo Gallegos (1884–1969), novelist and politician
- Alex García (born 1977), stock car racing driver, and a former competitor in the NASCAR Nationwide Series
- Juan Carlos Garcia (born 1971), actor.
- Freddy García (born 1976), professional baseball pitcher
- Luis Alberto García (born 1980), taekwondo practitioner
- Yusmely García (born 1983), hurdler
- Mikael Gayme (born 1979), alpine skier
- Alejandra Ghersi (born 1989), musician and record producer
- Tomás Gil (born 1977), professional track and road cyclist
- Alejandro Gómez (born 1985), swimmer
- Gilberto González (born 1970), triathlete
- Manny Gonzalez (born 1979), umpire in Major League Baseball (MLB)
- Rodolfo González (born 1986), racing driver
- Scarlet Gruber (born 1989), actress and dancer
- Pedro Gual (1783–1862), lawyer, politician, journalist and diplomat
- Heissler Guillent (born 1986), professional basketball player
- Luis Guillorme (born 1994), professional baseball player
- Antonio Guzmán Blanco (1829–1899), military leader, statesman, diplomat and politician
- Enrique Guzmán (born 1943), singer, actor

== H ==
- Reynaldo Hahn (1874–1947), composer, conductor, music critic, and singer.
- Carlos Guillermo Haydon (born 1976) actor, model.
- Veronica Hardy (born 1995), mixed martial artist.
- Carlos Morocho Hernández (1940–2016), world champion professional boxer.
- Dhison Hernández (born 1984), rower.
- Astrid Carolina Herrera (born 1963), actress and beauty queen who won Miss Venezuela World 1984, Miss World 1984.
- Francisco Herrera Luque (1927–1991), writer, psychiatrist and diplomat.

== I ==
- Gabriela Isler (born 1988), fashion model and beauty pageant titleholder who won Miss Venezuela 2012, Miss Universe 2013.
- Eduardo Iturrizaga (born 1989), chess player.
- Boris Izaguirre (born 1965), writer, tv host, screenwriter, journalist and showman.

== J ==
- Hernán Jansen (born 1985), fencer.

== L ==
- Cristóbal Lander (born 1977), actor, model.
- Roberto La Rocca (born 1988), racing driver.
- Carlos Lavado (born 1956), professional Grand Prix motorcycle racer.
- Belkis Leal (born 1940), fencer.
- Richard Leon (born 1976), judoka.
- Eduardo Liendo (1941–2025), writer and scholar.
- Luis Liendo (born 1980), Greco-Roman wrestler.
- Jessica López (born 1986), artistic gymnast.
- Leopoldo López (born 1971), coordinator and national velenzuelan political party Voluntad Popular (Popular Will) active leader opposition.
- Kevin Luarca (born 1993), former soccer player.

== M ==
- Enrique Maggiolo (born 1974), football manager.
- Maria Corina Machado (born 1967), politician who is a leading figure of the opposition to the government of Nicolás Maduro.
- Alexis Márquez (born 1989), swimmer.
- Carlos Mata (born 1952), actor, singer.
- Iván Márquez (born 1981), professional and olympic volleyball player.
- Bianca Matte (born 1990), beauty queen and holder of the titles of Miss Roraima 2013 and Miss Brazilian Tourism 2014.
- Leisha Medina (born 1986), voice actress.
- Wolfgang Mejías (born 1983), épée fencer.
- Maickel Melamed (born 1975), long-distance runner, motivational speaker, financing coach, teacher in philosophy and physiotherapist.
- Henry Meléndez (born 1984), football manager.
- Carlos Méndez (born 1974), Major League Baseball first baseman/designated hitter and right-handed batter.
- Diliana Méndez (born 1982), sport shooter.
- Dayana Mendoza (born 1986), actress, model, film producer and director.
- Lorenzo Mendoza (born 1965), billionaire businessman, and CEO of Empresas Polar.
- Robinson Merchán (born 1964), professional road racing cyclist.
- Yucef Merhi (born 1977), artist, poet and computer programmer based in New York.
- Alfonso Mestre (born 2001), swimmer.
- Freddy Mezones (born 1987), sprinter specialising in the 400 metres.
- Francisco de Miranda (1750–1816), military leader and revolutionary.
- Ricardo Monasterio (born 1978), swimmer.
- Gabriela Montero (born 1970), pianist.
- Carlos Monteverde (1919–2000), sports shooter.
- Jonathan Montenegro (born 1978), actor and singer.
- Lilibeth Morillo (born 1969), actress.
- Mariano Montilla (1782–1851), major general of the Army of Venezuela in the Venezuelan War of Independence.
- Carlos Montilla (born 1962), actor, musician, starred as Emilliano Galvez Escorza in Mariú.
- Nelson Mora (born 1976), butterfly swimmer.
- Omar Morales (born 1985), mixed martial artist.
- Carlos Morocho Hernández (1940–2016), world champion professional boxer.
- Garbiñe Muguruza (born 1989), professional tennis player, two-time Grand Slam champion.
- Dora Mazzone (born 1966), actress, antagonist.

== N ==
- Aldo Nannini (1951–1977), professional motorcycle racer.
- Daniela Navarro (born 1983), actress and model.
- Nancy Navarro (born 1965), politician and the first Latina county council member in Montgomery County, Maryland.
- Aquiles Nazoa (1920–1976), writer, journalist, poet and humorist.
- Vicente Nebrada (1920–2002), choreographer and dancer.
- Alexander Nelcha (born 1968), basketball player.
- Luis Noguera (born 1973), taekwondo practitioner.
- Alejandro Nones (born 1982), actor, model.
- Ramón Nomar (born 1974), pornographic actor.
- Erik Noya Cardona (born 1994), sport climber.

== O ==
- Iván Olivares (born 1961), basketball player.
- Roberto Olivo (1914–2005), international baseball umpire.
- Hely Ollarves (born 1981), track and field athlete.
- Luis Orta (born 1989), long distance runner.
- Liliana Ortega (born 1965), professor, and human rights lawyer and advocate.
- Scarlet Ortiz (born 1974), actress, model.

== P ==
- Riccardo Paciocco (born 1961), footballer
- Isabella Páez (born 1995), swimmer.
- Luis Arturo Paiva (born 1987), paralympic athlete.
- Bárbara Palacios Teyde (born 1963), TV host, writer, Christian preacher and beauty queen.
- Antonio José Pardo Andretta (born 1970), alpine skier.
- Isaac José Pardo (1905–2000), intellectual of German-Jewish extraction.
- Rene Paredes (born 1985), football placekicker.
- Andrea Pavani (born 1954), curler.
- Rhandy Piñango (born 1971), actor.
- Fernando Paz Castillo (1893–1981), poet, literary critic, diplomat, and educator.
- Robeilys Peinado (born 1997), athlete whose specialty is pole vaulting.
- Maylu Pena (born 1998), ballet dancer and ballet coach.
- Johan Pérez (born 1983), professional boxer.
- Luisana Pérez (born 1976), table tennis player.
- Juan Pablo Pérez Alfonzo (1903–1979), diplomat, politician and lawyer.
- Juan Antonio Pérez Bonalde (1846–1892), translator and poet.
- John Petrizzelli Font (born 1956), film director.
- Elluz Peraza (born 1958), beauty queen.
- Bernardo Piñango (born 1960), professional boxer.
- Rhandy Piñango (born 1971), actor.
- Félix Piñero (born 1945), fencer.
- Kervin Piñerua (1991–2016), volleyball player.
- Juan Bautista Plaza (1898–1965), classical composer.
- Lele Pons (born 1996), YouTuber, actress and singer.
- Enzo Potolicchio (born 1968), racing driver and businessman.

== Q ==
- Freddy Quintero (born 1938), fencer.

== R ==
- Tina Ramirez (1929–2022), dancer and educator.
- Luis Razetti (1862–1932), surgeon.
- Armando Reverón (1889–1954), painter and sculptor, precursor of Arte Povera and considered.
- Wuileixis Rivas (born 1990), Greco-Roman wrestler.
- Marcel Roche (1920–2003), physician, scientist and scientific leader.
- Andres Rodriguez (1984–2016), businessman and an international show jumping competitor.
- Francisco Rodríguez (born 1982), professional baseball pitcher.
- Simón Rodríguez (1769–1854), philosopher and educator.
- Zhandra Rodríguez (born 1947), ballet dancer and choreographer.
- Delcy Rodríguez (born 1969), diplomat, lawyer, incumbent 54rd President of Venezuela.
- Aldemaro Romero Jr. (born 1951), scientist, communicator, and public intellectual.
- Andy Rojas (born 1977), volleyball player.
- Arístides Rojas (born 1970), striker.
- Eloy Rojas (born 1967), professional boxer in the Featherweight division.
- Yulimar Rojas (born 1995), athlete who holds the world record for women's triple jump.
- Luis Rojas Martinez (born 1990), swimmer.
- Sheryl Rubio (born 1992), actress, singer-songwriter, model, dancer and fashion designer.
- Omar Rudberg (born 1998), singer and actor.
- Leonel Wilfredo Ruiz (born 1975), judoka.
- Miguel Ruiz (born 1990), professional basketball player.

== S ==
- Manuel Sosa (born 1983), telenovela actor.
- Gabriela Spanic (born 1973), telenovela actress.
- Yamil Saba (born 1975), windsurfer.
- Alfredo Sadel (1930–1989), singer and actor.
- Irene Sáez (born 1961) politician and beauty queen who was crowned Miss Universe 1981.
- Freddy Salazar (born 1949), fencer.
- Mayly Sánchez (born 1972), astrophysicist.
- Ingrid Sander (born 1937), fencer.
- Marcos Santana (born 1965), entrepreneur, producer and media creative, former president of NBCUniversal Telemundo Internacional.
- Carlos Santander (born 1975), swimmer.
- Nery Santos Gómez (born 1967), author.
- Marjorie de Sousa (born 1980), actress.
- Daniel Sasso (born 1982), football manager.
- Maritza Sayalero (born 1961), designer, model, businesswoman and beauty queen.
- Luis Schiavo (born 1981), racing driver.
- Sabrina Seara (born 1985), telenovela actress.
- Eldric Sella (born 1997), boxer.
- Arlene Semeco (born 1984), freestyle swimmer.
- Giancarlo Serenelli (born 1981), racing driver.
- Garly Sojo (born 1999), basketball player.
- Ambrosio Solorzano (born 1937), weightlifter.
- Nelson Solórzano (born 1959), basketball player.
- Juan Soto (born 1977), football referee.
- Yadira Soturno (born 1970), paralympic athlete.
- Andrea Stock (born 1980), curler.
- Ogleidis Suárez (born 1987), professional boxer.
- Tui T. Sutherland (born 1978), children's book author.
- Jacqueline Saburido (1978 – 2019) activist and burn survivor who campaigned against drunk driving.

== T ==
- Lilian Tintori (born 1978), activist, athlete, and television and radio host.
- Daniele Tirabassi (born 1988), swimmer.
- Carlos J. Tirado Yepes (born 1964), artist, painter and sculptor.
- Fermín Toro (1806–1865), humanist, politician, diplomat and author.
- Juan Vicente Torrealba (1917–2019), harpist and composer of popular music.
- Gleyber Torres (born 1996), professional baseball shortstop and second baseman.), actress.
- Carolina Tejera (born 1976), actress.
- Óscar Torres (born 1976), basketball player.
- Paul Torres (born 1983), professional racing cyclist.
- César Tovar (1940–1994), professional baseball player.
- Martín Tovar y Tovar (1827–1902), painter, best known for his portraits and historical scenes.

== U ==
- Miguel Ubeto (born 1976), road racing cyclist.
- Unos Panas Ahi, Argentinian/Venezuelan alternative rock band.
- Jorge Liberato Urosa Savino (1942–2021), prelate of the Catholic Church.
- Arturo Uslar Pietri (1906–2001), intellectual, historian, writer, television producer, and politician.

== V ==
- Ricardo Valderrama (born 1987), judoka.
- Rodman Valera (born 1982), volleyball player.
- José Gregorio Vargas (born 1982), professional basketball player.
- Greivis Vásquez (born 1987), professional basketball player.
- Betty Viana-Adkins (born 1971), professional female bodybuilder.
- Rafael Vidal (1964–2005), swimmer.
- Luis Villarroel (born 1981), diver.
- Winston Vallenilla (born 1973), actor starred as Dr Leonardo Izaguirre in Mariú.
- E. J. Viso (born 1985), professional racing driver.
- Omar Vizquel (born 1967), professional baseball shortstop.
- Shirley Varnagy (born 1982), journalist.

== Z ==
- Henry Zakka (born 1956), actor, director
- Jhornan Zamora (born 1989), basketball player.
