= Carlos J. Tirado Yepes =

Venezuelan artist, painter and sculptor

Carlos Tirado Yepes
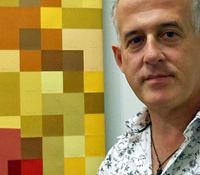
- Carlos Tirado Yepes
- Born: Carlos Tirado Yepes; April 3, 1964 (age 62); Caracas, Miranda

Carlos J. Tirado Yepes (born April 3, 1964, Caracas, Venezuela) is a Venezuelan artist, painter and sculptor who has developed a very personal and precise work line linked to Neo-pop art. With plenty of personal art exhibitions, Tirado Yepes has participated in numerous collective exhibitions, receiving different awards like III Premio de Escultura del Certamen Aires de Córdoba in 2004 and other recognitions, among them, in the Venezuelan Embassy in DC (2005), and the X Latin Art Festival of Atlanta (2005).

== Biography ==
Tirado Yepes grew up in an upper-middle-class family environment and could feel the inclination towards the arts from an early age. At 8, he was already experimenting with tridimensional forms, creating molds out of cast lead from pieces previously gathered on the streets. These first artistic experiences, led by his inquisitive nature, provided the ground to continue exploring the possibilities with different materials like wood waste and plaster. His childhood games were centered on painting and sculpting, which played a feature role that ranged from recreational to their esthetic aspects.

At 12, his parents finally agreed to register him in private art classes with professor Javier Hernandez in Caracas. During his adolescence, he understood that Art was a profession that required investment in materials, reason that led him to work at a furniture store where he would create and paint landscapes and figurative art to decorate the areas. He created numerous paintings of Caracas’ famous mountain: El Avila, and other art pieces that provided financial stability. This type of activity lead him to deepen his figurative expression.

In 1985, he started drawing comic sets for a renowned newspaper: El Diario de Caracas, alongside Jorge Blanco. It is the time when “Alfredo” was born; a cartoon character that has been part of Tirado Yepes all his life. Alfredo has also been featured in other newspapers like El Venezolano (in Miami, Florida). His presence in El Diario de Caracas was the beginning of a series of other comic characters later leveraged by private companies to be used as images for personnel improvement and corporate safety programs. After finishing High School, he decided to study art. However, that was not his parents’ plan, therefore agreed to study law at the Universidad Santa Maria in Caracas during evenings while attending Art School at the Escuela Cristobal Rojas during mornings. He graduated from Law School in 1991.

The courses taken at the Escuela Cristobal Rojas offered many opportunities since he was a pupil of Jorge Stever, Patricia Rizzo, Graciela Simmonato, among others. These were well-established and renowned artists who specialized in hyperrealism, abstract art or other conceptual propositions. Tirado Yepes continued working on decoration while he began to participate in art exhibitions, being recognized as the “El Avila” artist.

In 2003, he was invited to participate in the collective art exhibition honoring El Avila at the Venezuelan Consulate in Miami, Florida. He decided to take a leap from local market decorative work to something riskier. His goal was to produce art pieces with the needed stature to be internationally recognized.

Working with Jorge Stever, Tirado Yepes was introduced to contemporary sculpture using non-traditional materials. He learned to create tridimensional pieces mixing sand and resins. However, he found himself making similar pieces just like his mentor. This is when a decision was made to break that line of work and look for his own language.

He moved to South Florida and started working with available materials, which in some cases were very restrictive and different from the ones used in Venezuela: the river sand found in his country was substituted in his art work for a fine, white sand from ground coral, which resulted in a totally different product from the art pieces created in his native country.

From this point on, a new series of Black and White artwork is born. With the use of coral sand mixed with black resin over different objects, Tirado Yepes recreate the objects and people found in the ruins of Pompeii, covered in ashes and lava, soaked by time. These pieces have a calcified look with an intense black hue that resembles raw petroleum. This art evokes the look of a city that could be covered in ashes from a Volcano, and at the same time, it is a metaphor for Caracas and its oil-covered society.

Tirado Yepes agrees that he feels an attraction towards Pop Art. One of his major impulses has been to humanize those mass reaching characters like comic characters, with common problems as any human living in an everyday environment. Nevertheless, his major contribution has been his personal language representing these themes, which indeed resembles Pop Art, but has a twist that Tirado Yepes has achieved after years of investigation and research. In searching for his own expression, he decided to recycle an already existing man-made material, changing its original purpose.

He opts to use an approximate 600-pantone-color chart from exterior paints at home improvement stores. The strategic combination of these samples based on the principles of collage: cutting and pasting produce a marvelous pixel-like image of outstanding beauty and allure. In the digital realm, a pixel is the smallest chromatic unit of an image. In Tirado Yepes artistic expression this concept is inverted creating an interesting game as a result of his investigation. He manually cuts one-color pieces, positions and pastes them over the canvas, looking to create a desired image. In some instances he applies small touches of color over the canvases. This technique, also known as “anti-pixel” by some art critique, simulates the pixelated look of an over-zoomed digital picture; however, when viewed in detail, is clear that the process as very different in Tirado Yepes work, as he begins breaking the digital logic: instead of taking the image to its minimum chromatic expression, he builds off that minimum expression. In fact, they are not realistically minimal since the materials (paint samples) used by the artist measure approximately 10 x 10 cm.

Using this technique, Tirado Yepes has created portraits of internationally recognized characters (presidents, renowned politicians, and artists) and pop culture icons (Marilyn Monroe, Monalisa, and cartoon characters, among others).

He has participated in numerous collective art exhibitions, like Nobe 67 Art (Miami, 2008), Art Shangai 2010 and 2011, Florencia's Biennal (2011), Mérida-Mexico Biennal, among others.

== Museums and Biennials ==
=== 2010-Present ===
- 2018 Niagara Falls, Ontario, Canada
- 2013 Biennial International of Miami, Miami Florida
- 2013 XIV Biennale di Florence, Florence Italy
- 2013 London Art Biennials London, England
- 2012 Biennials di Chincianno Sienna, Italia
- 2012 Museo de Arte Contemporáneo Ciudad de Mérida, México
- 2012 Imperial Contemporary Museum of Beijing Beijing, China
- 2012 FIA Feria Internacional del Arte, Caracas Venezuela
- 2012 Biennial of Dublin Dublin, Ireland
- 2011 Heng Lu Art Museum Hangzhou, China
- 2011 Biennale Internazionale d’Arte Contemporanea di Firenze Firenze, Italy
- 2011 Bandi Trazos Gallery Seoul, Korea
- 2011 Shanghai Art Fair, The American Wing Pavilion Shanghai, China
- 2011 Alma Fine Art Gallery Wynwood, Florida 2008 Summer Artists DCSA Doral, Florida

=== 2000-2010 ===
- 2008 Arte Americas, Miami, Florida
- 2008 NOBE 67 Art North Miami, Florida
- 2007 Museum of Air, Cordoba, Spain
- 2006 Museum Arturo Michelena, Valencia, Venezuela
- 2006 Hispanic Festival, North Carolina
- 2005 Second International Room of Plastic Arts, Cordoba, Spain
- 2005 10th Latin Art Festival of Georgia, Atlanta, Georgia
- 2005 Consulate of Venezuela in Miami, Miami, Florida
- 2004 NPTI Miami, Fl Miami, Florida
- 2004 El Pueblo Inc. Raleigh, North Carolina
- 2004 Main Library of Broward County, Fort Lauderdale, Florida
- 2003 Homenage to "El Avila", Consulate of Venezuela Miami, Florida
- 2002 Weston Community Center Weston, Florida
- 2001 13rd Room of the Tessari Rizzo ́s Museum Caracas, Venezuela
- 2001 C & C Fine Art Gallery Weston, Florida
- 2000 Museo de Arte la Estancia Caracas, Venezuela

=== Pre-2000 ===
- 1999 Museo de Arte la Estancia Caracas, Venezuela
- 1997 Museo Jacobo Borges Caracas, Venezuela

== Individual exhibitions ==
2018 “Crossing” at Ferrari Furniture, Shanghai, China 2018 Series Tirado al Piso Atlanta, at Besharat Art Gallery, Atlanta Georgia 2018 Collection “Tirado al Piso” at Art and Design Gallery, Miami, Florida 2018 Miami Art Space 2017 Lanyee Art Space, Shanghai China 2016 Miami Art Center, Wynwood Florida 2015 White Art Gallery, Bird Rd. Florida 2015 MIArt Wynwood, Florida 2015 Art Expo New York, NY 2011 Neo Pop Today by Carlos Tirado Wynwood, Florida 2010 Curators Voice Gallery Wynwood, Florida 2009 Power Museum Coral Gables, Florida 2007 Doral Conservatory and School of Arts Doral, Florida 2007 Museo de Aire Cordoba, Spain 2006 Arenas By CJ Tirado Yepes Doral, Florida 2005 Consulate of Venezuela in Miami Miami, Florida 2005 Embassy of Venezuela Washington DC 2005 Bolivarian Hall of Washington DC Washington DC 2004 Gallery NAPP Weston, Florida 2004 Government Center of Fort Lauderdale Fort Lauderdale, Florida 2003 "Jugando con Arenas" NPTI Gallery Miami, Florida 2002 Homenage to The Avila. Miami, Florida 2002 The Venezuelan Center of Art New York, New York 2001 Weston Community Center Weston, Florida

== Awards ==
2012 Art of the year, Le Concierge Magazine Caracas, Venezuela 2008 Museo de Aire Cordoba, Spain 2006 Doral Conservatory Artist of the Month Miami, Florida 2005 10th Latin Art Festival of Atlanta Atlanta, Georgia 2005 Consulate of Venezuela in Miami Miami, Florida 2005 Washington, DC 2004 New Professions Technical Institute Miami, Florida 2004 Third Place International Prize Aires of Cordoba Cordoba, Spain 2003 New Professions Technical Institute Miami, Florida 2002 Consulate of Venezuela Miami, Florida 2000 Consulate of Venezuela Miami, Florida

ART FAIRS

2019 Tokyo International Art Fair 2018 Shenzhen International Art Fair, China 2018 22nd Shanghai Art Fair, China 2018 Korean International Art Fair, Seoul 2018 Art Expo New York 2018 Art Las Vegas 2017 Art Santa Fe 2017 Shanghai Art Fair 2017 Art Beijing 2017 Art Expo New York 2016 Art Expo New York, NY 2016 Art Beijing, Beijing China 2016 Shanghai Art Fair, Shanghai China 2016 Latin American Art Exhibition Liege- Belgium 2015 Art Expo New York. NY 2014 Shanghai Art Fair. Shanghai, China 2014 Scoope New York, New York, US 2013 Art Expo Beijing, China 2013 Art Expo New York, South Florida Art Gallery 2013 Art Wynwood, Rimonin Art Gallery Miami, FL. 2012 Feria Iberoamericana de las Artes Caracas, Venezuela 2012 Hongqiao Carnival Art Fair Shanghai, China 2011 Miami International Art Miami, Fl. 2011 Shanghai Art Fair Shanghai, China 2011 Art Shanghai Shanghai, China 2011 Shanghai Art Fair Shanghai, China 2011 Canton Art Fair Canton, China 2010 Art Shanghai Shanghai, China 2008 Arte Americas Miami, Fl. 1987 Salones Hervigon Puerto La Cruz, Venezuela 1986 Salones Hervigon Maracaibo, Venezuela 1986 Salones Hervigon Barquisimeto, Venezuela 1985 Salones Hervigon Caracas, Venezuela
