= Melamed (surname) =

Melamed (Hebrew: מלמד)
Origin
- Language: Hebrew

Melamed is a Hebrew surname. "Melamed" translates to "teacher" in the Hebrew language and came into different languages in different spellings, e.g. Malamud, Malamed, Melamid, etc.

Some variants of the spelling should not be confused with "Malamute" or "Malemute".

Those with the surname include:

- Avraham Melamed (politician) (1921–2005), former member of Knesset from National Religious Party
- Avraham Melamed (swimmer) (born 1944), Israeli former swimmer
- Douglas Melamed (born 1945), American legal scholar
- Fred Melamed (born 1956), American actor and writer
- Guy Melamed (born 1979), Israeli footballer
- Leo Melamed (born 1932), former chairman of the Chicago Mercantile Exchange and executive in the field of global derivatives
- Maickel Melamed (born 1975), Venezuelan long-distance runner, motivational speaker, financing coach, teacher in philosophy and physiotherapist
- Nico Melamed (born 2001), Spanish footballer
- Tatiana Melamed (born 1974), Ukrainian and German chess grandmaster
- Vince Melamed, American keyboardist and songwriter
- Yitzhak Melamed (born 1968), Israeli-American philosopher
- Rabbi Zalman Baruch Melamed (born 1937), the rosh yeshiva of the Beit El yeshiva in Beit El
