= Avraham Melamed =

Avraham Melamed may refer to:

- Avraham Melamed (politician)
- Avraham Melamed (swimmer)
