= Malamed =

Malamed is a Hebrew surname which translates to teacher in English, a variant of Melamed; see this page for other variants. Notable people with the surname include:

- Lionel Malamed
- Stanley Malamed
