= Jorge Blanco (artist) =

Venezuelan-born American artist

- Jorge Blanco
- Born: Jorge Blanco; March 21, 1945 (age 81); Caracas, Venezuela
- Education: Neumann Institute of Design, Caracas; Academy of Fine Arts, Rome (informal study)
- Known for: Sculpture, graphic design, illustration, public art
- Notable work: The Castaway, Go Bongo, Swimming in Jupiter, Smile
- Style: Abstract, modernist, colorful, geometric
- Movement: Modern art, public art
- Awards: Dattero D'Argento; 1978 Monterotondo Sculpture Prize; 1978 John Ringling Visual Art Award; 2007
- Website: jorgeblancosculpture.com

Jorge Blanco (born March 21, 1945, in Caracas) is a Venezuelan-born American artist, who emigrated to the United States in 1999. He has spent his professional career working as a sculptor, graphic designer and illustrator. He is the creator of the comic strip The Castaway. He served as Creative Director of El Museo de los Niños for twenty years.

== Education ==
Blanco began drawing and painting in 1967 and sculpting in the early 1970s, although he was interested in art from an early age. He received his formal training at the Neumann Institute in Caracas, Venezuela, which he attended with the aid of a scholarship. In 1971, Blanco graduated as an industrial designer from the Neumann Institute of Design in Caracas, Venezuela, after which he worked as a graphic designer. From 1975 to 1979, he lived in Rome, Italy, where he attended open classes at the Academy of Fine Arts.

== Career ==
Blanco's first solo exhibition was in 1974, where he showed sculpture and drawings. A year later, he moved to Rome, Italy, where he continued to work in sculpture while making a living by doing freelance graphic design drawing cartoons for a variety of newspapers and magazines, including political cartoons for the newspaper L'Opinione.

In 1978, Blanco participated in the Bordhigera Humor Salon, winning the Dattero D'Argento, and in the Monterotondo Sculpture Salon, where he was awarded the first prize for medium format sculpture.

In 1979, Blanco returned to Caracas, Venezuela, where he exhibited his sculptures and drawings at the Sofía Imber Museum of Contemporary Art. Here, he continued working in sculpture but he also designed and illustrated a children's newspaper El Cohete.

In 1980, he was hired as the Art Director for the Caracas Children's Museum (Art, Science and Technology, Museo de los Niños). He worked there until 1998.

That same year, Blanco created the comic strip The Castaway/El Náufrago, which made its debut in El Diario de Caracas. It was published in major newspapers and magazines in Venezuela and led to significant sales in merchandising and books. The Castaway was also adapted to television. Due to the comic's success, Blanco no longer had time to work on his sculpture alongside his work as freelance graphic designer, illustrator, and his job at the museum, and had to put sculpture aside.

In 1989, Blanco returned to sculpture, and eventually left the Caracas Children's Museum to move to the United States. Blanco began exhibiting again in both Venezuela and the United States as well as around the world. In 1996, Blanco installed four sculptures in Tokyo, Japan.

Since 1999, Blanco has lived and worked on the West Coast of Florida, with a particular focus on public art. In 2005, Blanco became an American citizen. He currently resides in Sarasota, Florida.

In 2007, Blanco received the John Ringling Visual Art Award.

== The Castaway (El Naufrago) ==
The Castaway is a comic strip created by Blanco in 1980 about a man trapped on an island that was originally printed in the newspaper El Diario de Caracas. "The Castaway" was also published in the United States in The Observer, a Sarasota-based weekly newspaper.

== Influences ==
Blanco's early works were influenced by his teachers Gertrude Goldschmidt (Gego) and Cornelis Zitman and by the work of artists such as Auguste Herbin, Paul Klee and Joan Miró. At this time, he worked with materials such as Lycra, rope, wood, mirrors, and bronze. In 1992, Blanco began to explore color and metal as a primary material.

== Public art ==
- "Go Bongo", Ghent Station, Norfolk, Virginia, US
- "Swimming in Jupiter", Town of Jupiter, Florida, US
- "AIR", MARC athletic Center, Park City, Utah, US
- Breakaway, Renown Health Center, Reno, Nevada, US
- Yellow Thinker, Renown Health Center. Reno, Nevada, US
- El Camarada, José Ignacio, Punta del Este, Uruguay
- Freeriding, Jack Harris Park, North Central College, Michigan, US
- Dynamics, Fort Pierce, Florida, US
- For The Goal, Leawood Park, Kansas, US
- Red Run Red, Leawood Park, Kansas, US
- See Run Red, R Park, Roeland Park, Kansas, US
- Yellow Bench, Roeland Park, Kansas, US
- In The Swim, Marina Plaza, Fort Pierce, Florida, US
- Andalucia, Riverside Commerce Park, Palm Beach Gardens, Florida, US
- Alfresco, University Ridge Park, Reno, Nevada, US
- Smile, Boulevard of the Arts, Sarasota, Florida, US
- Pleasant Tree, Chula Vista Public Library, California, US
- Phoenix, Anderson Administration Building, Venice, Florida, US
- To Be Red, Longboat Key Center for the Arts, Sarasota, Florida, US
- Cartwheel, Public Arts in Public Schools Project, Sarasota, Florida, US
- The Runners, Sarasota, Florida, US
- Maratón, Caracas, Venezuela
- Nagayama Plaza, group of three sculptures, Tokyo, Japan
- Sun Smile, Azabu Juban, Minato Ku, Tokyo, Japan

== Exhibits ==
=== Solo exhibitions ===
- 2014/15 "The Joy of Living" O. Ascanio Gallery, Miami, Florida, US
- 2012 "Art Nocturne" Sculpture. Knokke-Heist, Belgium
- 2010 "De Punta en Blanco" Sculpture. Espacio Tierra Negra Gallery. José Ignacio, Uruguay
- 2009 "New Sculptures" One-man exhibition. HW Gallery. Naples, Florida, US
- 1997 "Metálicas de Vida Alegre" Sculptures & Serigraphs. Icono Gallery. Caracas, Venezuela
- 1995 "Humor de Acero" Sculptures. Centro de Arte Euroamericano. Caracas, Venezuela
- 1992 "Caras y una Patilla" Sculpture. Galería Oscar Ascanio. Caracas, Venezuela
- 1979 "Esculturas y Dibujos" Museo de Arte Contemporáneo de Caracas. Caracas, Venezuela
- 1978 "Scultura e Disegni" Istituto Italo-Latino Americano. Roma, Italia
- 1976 "Disegni" Paesi Nuovi Gallery. Roma, Italia
- 1974 "30 Dibujos" Galería Banap. Caracas, Venezuela

=== Selected group exhibitions ===
- 2015 "Contemporary Expressions & Recent Sculptures by Jorge Blanco" O. Ascanio Gallery, Miami, Florida, US
- 2015 "The Lightness of Being: Abstracts: Part I" Allyn Gallup Contemporary Art, Sarasota, Florida, US
- 2015 "Fluid Formalism: Concepts in Motion" O. Ascanio Gallery, Miami, Florida, US
- 2014 "Pinta Art Fair" O. Ascanio Gallery, Miami, Florida, US
- 2014 "Made in Sarasota", Allyn Gallup Contemporary Art, Sarasota, Florida, US
- 2013 "Movement Through Colors", O. Ascanio Gallery, Miami, Florida, US
- 2013 "Black, White & Red" A New Leaf Gallery/Sculpturesite, Sonoma, California, US
- 2012 "Aesthetic Perfection" O. Ascanio Gallery, Miami, Florida, US
- 2012 "Scope Miami" Miami, Florida, US
- 2012 "Small-format Sculpture" Galerie Artelie. Paris, France
- 2012 "Sculpture" Cafmeyer Gallery. Knokke-Heist, Belgium
- 2012 "Florida Outdoor Sculpture Competition" Polk Museum of Art + City of Winter Haven. Winter Haven, Florida, US
- 2011 "Burst Art Fair" Miami, Florida, US
- 2011 "Public Art Exhibition" Coastal Discovery Museum. Hilton Head Island, South Carolina, US
- 2010 "WOW 3" Large-scale Sculpture Exhibition. Fort Pierce, Florida, US
- 2008 "Cedarhurst Biennale" Cedarhurst Center for the Arts. Mt. Vernon, Illinois, US
- 2008 "Third Beijing International Art Biennale" National Art Museum of China, Beijing, China
- 2008 "WOW 2" Large-scale Sculpture Exhibition. Fort Pierce, Florida, US
- 2008 "Where the Wild Things (still) are" The Art Gallery at Florida Gulf Coast University. Fort Myers, Florida
- 2007 "Sarasota Season of Sculpture 4" Large-scale exhibition. Sarasota, Florida, US
- 2007 "Sculpture in the Plaza" Sculpturesite Gallery. San Francisco, California, US
- 2006 "Figuratively Speaking Exhibition" Large-scale sculpture. Stamford, Connecticut, US
- 2006 "Primary Colors" Sculpturesite Gallery. San Francisco, California, US
- 2006 "Sarasota Season of Sculpture Exhibition." Sarasota, Florida, US
- 2005 "Grand Opening Exhibition" Sculpturesite Gallery. San Francisco, California, US
- 2005"New Works" A New Leaf Gallery-Sculpture Site. Berkeley, California, US
- 2004 "Sculpture" Fenn Gallery. Woodbury, Connecticut, US
- 2004 "Sculpture" A New Leaf Gallery. Berkeley, California, US
- 2004 "ArteAmericas" Miami, Florida, US
- 2004 "Sculpture" Longboat Key Center for the Arts. Longboat Key, Florida, US
- 2004 "Urban Trees" Port of San Diego. California, US
- 2004 "Sarasota Season of Sculpture" Sarasota, Florida, US
- 2003 "Hispanic Artists" City of Aventura Government Building. Aventura, Florida, US
- 2003 "Sculpture" Katherine Butler Gallery. Sarasota, Florida, US
- 2001 "Pier Walk Exhibition" Navy Pier. Chicago, Illinois, US
- 1999 "Biennale Internazionale dell'Arte Contemporanea" Firenze, Italia
- 1998 "Fundraising Gala" John & Mable Ringling Museum of Art. Sarasota, Florida, US
- 1998 "Sculpture" Galleria Silecchia. Sarasota, Florida, US
- 1997 "Una Tonelada de Arte" Sculpture. Miami Beach, Florida, US
- 1997 "Sculpture," Virginia Miller Gallery. Coral Gables, Florida, US
- 1996 "Esculturas" Galería Ardentía. Porlamar, Venezuela
- 1993 "Coca-Cola, 50 años con el Arte" Galería Oscar Ascanio. Caracas, Venezuela
- 1993 "Primer Festival de Esculturas" Centro Cultural Consolidado. Caracas, Venezuela
- 1987 "Primer Festival de Arte Venezolano" Galería Oscar Ascanio. Caracas, Venezuela
- 1981 "Primera Bienal de Artes Visuales" Museo de Bellas Artes, Caracas, Venezuela
- 1980 "Esculturas" Galería Terracota. Caracas, Venezuela
- 1979 "XVIII Premio Internacional de Dibujo Joan Miro" Barcelona, España
- 1979 "Dibujos" Concejo Municipal del Distrito Federal. Caracas, Venezuela
- 1979 "XXXVII Salon Arturo Michelena" Ateneo de Valencia. Venezuela
- 1979 "XVII Premio Salón Internacional de Dibujo Joan Miro" Barcelona, España
- 1979 "Primer Salón de Dibujo Nuevo" Banco Central de Venezuela. Caracas, Venezuela
- 1978 "III Salón Internacional de Escultura, Pintura y Gráfica" Torre D'Ansperto, Milano, Italia
- 1977 "Mostra di Artisti Latinoamericani a Roma" Galleria San Marco, Roma, Italia
- 1977 "XVI Premio Internacional de Dibujo Joan Miro" Barcelona, España
- 1977 "Nuevas Proposiciones" Casa Bello. Caracas, Venezuela
- 1977 "Muestra de Dibujos" Sala de la Cultura. Diputación de Navarra, Pamplona, España
- 1975 "XXXIII Salón Arturo Michelena" Ateneo de Valencia, Venezuela
- 1975 "Primer Encuentro de Jóvenes Artistas" Casa de la Cultura. Maracay, Venezuela
- 1975 "IV Salón Nacional de Jóvenes Artistas" INCIBA. Caracas, Venezuela
- 1975 "Plástica Jóven" Instituto Venezolano del Petróleo. Caracas, Venezuela
- 1975 "Primer Salón de Dibujo, Grabado y Diseño Gráfico". Universidad de los Andes. Mérida, Venezuela
- 1975 "II Salón Nacional de Escultura" Universidad de Carabobo. Valencia, Venezuela
- 1975 "Varias Visiones" Galería G. Caracas, Venezuela
- 1974 "XXXII Salon Arturo Michelena" Ateneo de Valencia. Valencia, Venezuela
- 1973 "III Salón Nacional de Jóvenes Artistas" INCIBA. Caracas, Venezuela
- 1973"Primer Salón de Arte Centro Plaza" Caracas, Venezuela
- 1971 "Gráfica Joven" Galería de Arte y Grabado. Caracas, Venezuela

== Sources ==
- Jorge Blanco official webpage
- Sculpture Site: Jorge Blanco
