= Malamud =

Malamud מלמוד
Origin
- Language: Hebrew

Other names
- Variant forms: Melamed and variants

Malamud is a Hebrew surname which translates to teacher in English, a variant of Melamed; see this page for other variants. Notable people with the surname include:

- Bernard Malamud (1914–1986), American novelist, short story writer
- Carl Malamud (born 1959), American non-fiction writer
- Janna Malamud Smith (born 1952), American writer, memoirist; daughter of Bernard Malamud
- Margaret Malamud (21st century), American academic and classical scholar
- Mark Malamud (born 1960), American inventor
- Daniel Malamud (born 1996), Israeli-English Swimmer
