= Melamid =

Melamid is a Hebrew surname which translates to teacher in English, a variant of Melamed; see this page for other variants.

Melamid may refer to:

- Alexander Melamid (born 1945), American Russian-Jewish artist
- Daniel Melamid (1916–1993), Soviet and Russian historian
