= Mauro Libi Crestani =

Venezuelan businessman who owns a major food distribution company in Venezuela

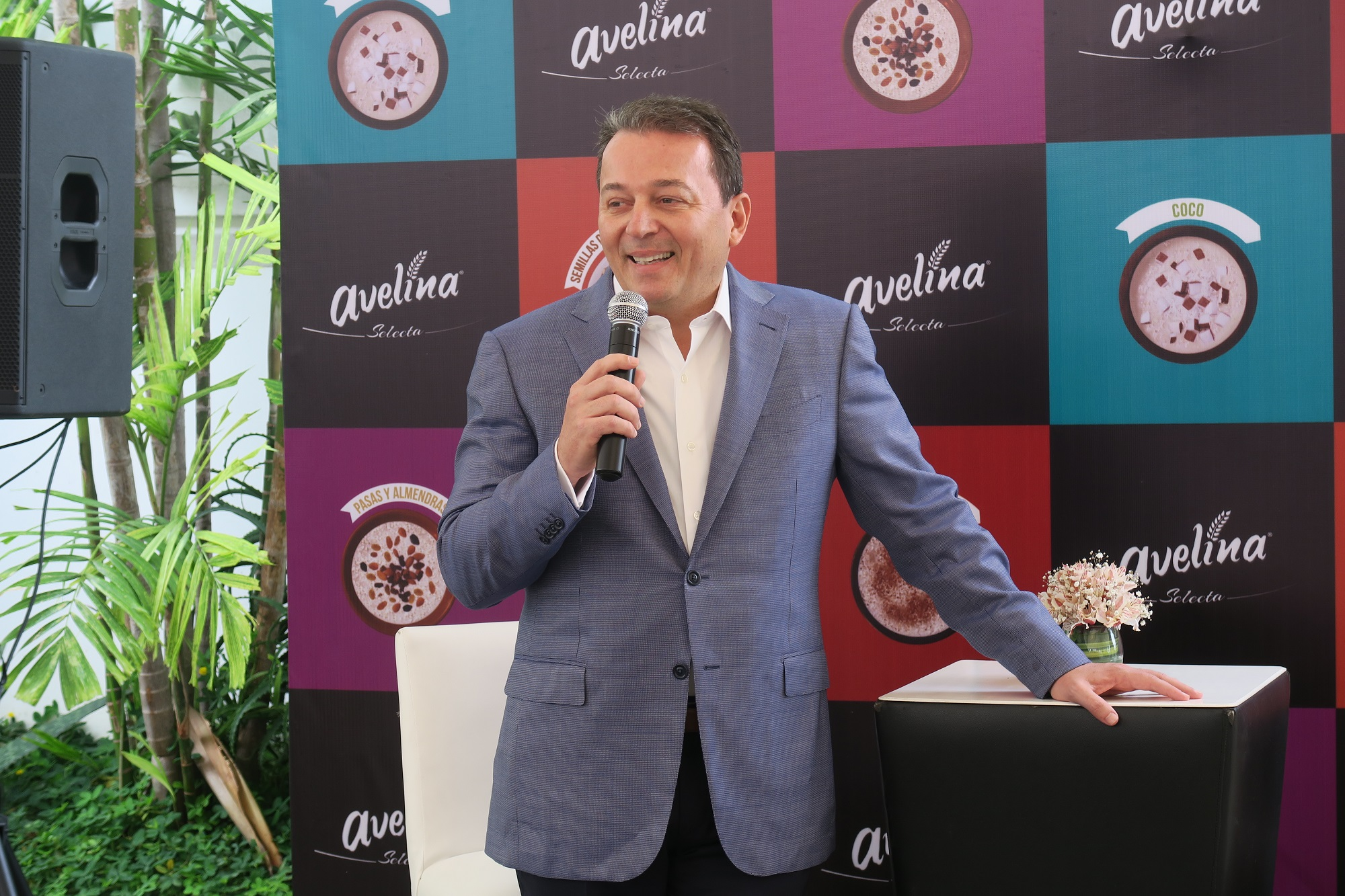
- Mauro Libi inside the headquarters of his Frimaca company
- Born: 1968 (age 57–58); Venezuela
- Occupation: Businessman
- Known for: President and CEO of food distribution company Avenas Inproceca
- Website: mauro-libi.com

Mauro Libi Crestani is a Venezuelan businessman and boliburgués who is the owner of the food distribution company Avenas Inproceca. He is an owner, a major shareholder, or holds some other controlling position in over 30 companies.

== Early life ==
Mauro Libi Crestani was born in Caracas, Venezuela. His father was a businessman in the transportation industry and eventually created a food industry business.

When he was 16 years old, Libi Crestani went to Milan, Italy, to study management. Upon returning, he worked at his father's food business.

Libi Crestani made “his mark as a food importer and entrepreneur" beginning in the early 2000s. That was the same period that coincided with Hugo Chávez being in power in Venezuela.

== Career ==
Before running Avenas Inproceca, Libi Crestani started his business career in 1996 when he was 26 years old. His first job was in his father's company overseeing 33 employees.

In 2012, Libi Crestani set an ambitious goal of getting 30 percent of the oats market in Venezuela. He opened a new oat processing plant in Guatire, a city in Miranda, Venezuela.

Libi Crestani serves as the president of Avenas Inproceca. The company processes and distributes 24 oat products throughout Venezuela. Approximately 1,400 people work at the company. Its premium oatmeal brand is called Avelina.

== Other interests ==
In 2008, Libi Crestani launched a foundation to aid youngsters in "response to an influx of children living on the streets of Vargas." The foundation, the Casa Hogar Foundation, pays for housing, school, and medical care. Since its founding, it has served 146 children. The background for the need for the foundation lies in the 1999 mudslide "Vargas tragedy."

== Controversies ==
Libi has been accused of corruption and has been investigated by several government bodies. He was exonerated by the Venezuela National Assembly, the country's legislative branch, in late 2016. The original complaint had been filed by the ruling party Chavista group.

When asked, Libi told The Financial Times in July 2017 that the allegations against him were false and that they were an attempted smear campaign.

In August 2016, the Audit Commission, a body within the Venezuela National Assembly, investigated Libi's business activities based on a "dossier compiled by Socialist Tide, a splinter Chavista group." On October 5, 2016, Libi appeared before the commission to defend himself. By December 7, the commission closed its investigation.

Many of those companies do significant business with the federal government of Venezuela. He owns companies in the food industry that have received large government contracts whereby the government buys the product in very large quantities. The contracts bring the food to the government, which then goes to supply the Venezuelan citizens with oat products.
