= Riccardo Paciocco =

Italian footballer (born 1961)

Personal information
- Date of birth: March 25, 1961 (age 65)
- Place of birth: Caracas, Venezuela
- Height: 1.80 m (5 ft 11 in)
- Position: Midfielder

Youth career
- Torino

Senior career*
Years	Team	Apps	(Gls)
1979–1980	Rosetana	25	(2)
1980–1981	Teramo	15	(2)
1981–1983	Jesi	60	(26)
1983	Milan	2	(0)
1983–1987	Lecce	104	(15)
1987–1988	Pisa	21	(1)
1988–1989	Lecce	26	(2)
1989–1991	Reggina	55	(7)
1992	Teramo	9	(1)
1998–2000	Vacri		

Managerial career
- 1997–1998: Miglianico
- 1998–2000: Vacri
- 2000–2002: Val di Sangro
- 2002–2003: Adriano Flacco GT
- 2003–2006: Ripa Teatina
- 2007–2008: Ortona
- 2008–2009: Guardiagrele
- * Club domestic league appearances and goals

Riccardo Paciocco (born March 25, 1961) is an Italian football coach and former professional player.

A midfielder, he made nearly 300 appearances in the Italian professional leagues, including four seasons in Serie A with Milan, Lecce and Pisa, during which he scored five goals from 74 appearances.
