= Maickel Melamed =

Venezuelan long-distance runner

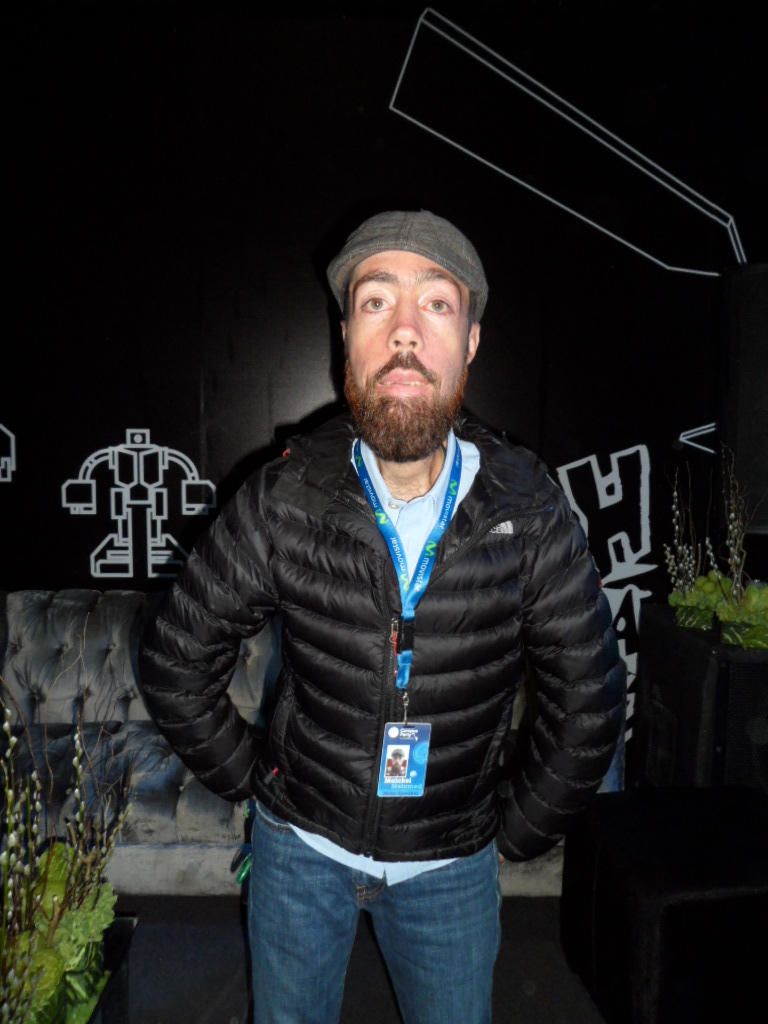
- Maickel Melamed in Campus Party 2013

Personal information
- Born: April 27, 1975 (age 50) Caracas, Venezuela
- Height: 1.6 m (5 ft 3 in)
- Weight: 57 kg (126 lb)

Sport
- Country: Venezuela
- Sport: Athletics
- Event: Marathon

Michael Melamed (born 27 April 1975 in Caracas) is a Venezuelan long-distance runner, motivational speaker, financing coach, teacher in philosophy and physiotherapist. Despite being physically disabled from low muscle tone, he has completed the New York City Marathon, Berlin Marathon, Chicago Marathon and the Boston Marathon. Melamed has also climbed Venezuela's highest mountain, Pico Bolívar. As a consequence of complicated delivery due to nuchal cord, Melamed has generalized muscle hypotonia.

Melamed is an economist graduated from Caracas' Universidad Católica Andrés Bello, a Gestalt Psychotherapist and in 2012 received an honorary degree from Valencia's Universidad Tecnológica del Centro.
