= El Diario de Caracas =

Defunct Venezuelan newspaper from Caracas

- Logo of El Diario de Caracas
- Type: Digital newspaper
- Format: Website
- Founded: 1979
- Language: Spanish
- Headquarters: Caracas, Venezuela
- Website: eldiario.com

El Diario de Caracas, was one of the best known newspapers of Venezuela. The paper was founded in 1979 by a group of investors who had the concern to launch a tabloid newspaper with a critical orientation both socio-culturally and politically. It was co-founded in 1979 by Diego Arria and the writer Tomás Eloy Martínez. The Group 1BC, owner of RCTV, would subsequently obtain a majority shareholder stake in El Diario de Caracas taking its lead.

The newspaper would continue to grow to become a reference of the capital city and the country and its opinion columns would obtain great recognition. During the eighties, though, it saw its financial capacity reduced despite the fact that its circulation had grown exponentially. The board of shareholders of 1BC-RCTV decided to close its doors in 1995.

El Diario de Caracas subsequently integrates with The Daily Journal, a Venezuelan newspaper in English, home owned by Peruvian businessman Julio Augusto Lopez Enriquez, who sold to El Diario de Caracas in 2004.

After several changes of shareholders and relaunch attempts, El Diario de Caracas stopped circulating as printed newspaper.

Between May 2, 2012 and July 11, 2019, a digital newspaper with the name of diariodeCaracas.com showed up on Internet networks. Since December 17, 2019, El Diario de Caracas was relaunched under its new name El Diario and currently appears in digital format as eldiario.com.

== See also ==
- List of newspapers in Venezuela
