= Jacobo Borges =

Venezuelan artist

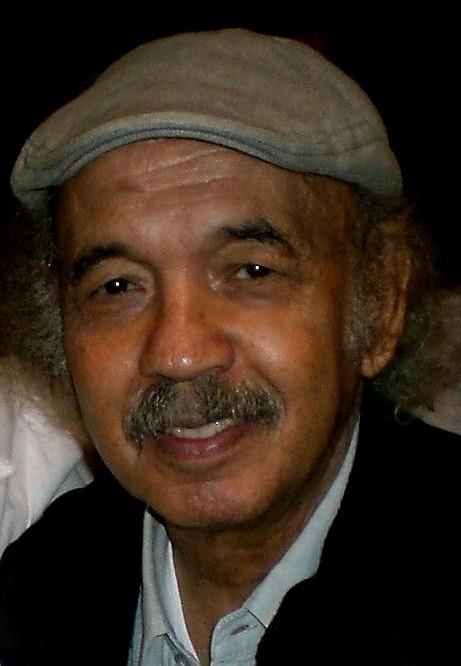
- Born: 28 November 1931 (age 94); Caracas, Venezuela
- Known for: Painter, Film Director, Stage Designer
- Notable work: Characters from Napoleon's Coronation
- Movement: Neo-Figuration

Jacobo Borges (born 28 November 1931 in Caracas, Venezuela) is a contemporary, neo-figurative Venezuelan artist. The mediums he has worked in include painting, drawing, filmmaking, stage design, and sculpture. Considered one of the most accomplished Latin American artists of the 20th century, Borges first received international recognition as a painter in the 1960s and attracted further attention as a theorist and writer. His oeuvre includes a rich body of paintings, a film directed in 1969, and a book The Great Mountain and Its Era, published in 1979.

== Personal life ==
Jacobo Borges resides in New York City and Caracas, Venezuela. He has a wife, Diana and three children, a daughter named Ximena and two sons, one named Ezequiel and other Emiliano.

== Biography ==
=== Early years (1945–1955) ===
During his youth, Jacobo held various jobs. He worked as a lithographer at the Cartones de Venezuela company and as a draftsman at the McCann-Erickson advertising agency alongside the master Carlos Cruz-Diez.

Between 1945 and 1948, he met the painter Armando Reverón and came into contact with the poet Aquiles Nazoa and the Cuban writer Alejo Carpentier. The following year, in 1949, he enrolled in the School of Plastic and Applied Arts in Caracas, where he studied for two years.

In 1951, he worked at the Taller Libre de Arte in Caracas and exhibited his first paintings. One of them, "La lámpara y la silla" (The Lamp and the chair), received the first prize in the 1952 Young Painting Contest promoted by the newspaper El Nacional, Metro-Goldwyn-Mayer, and the Embassy of France in Venezuela. The prize was a ten-month study scholarship in Paris, where he stayed for several years, taking on various jobs. There, he exhibited at the Salon de la Joven Pintura at the Museum of Modern Art in Paris.

=== Recognition inside and outside Venezuela (1956–1964) ===
After returning to Venezuela, he held solo exhibitions at the Museum of Fine Arts in Caracas and the Lauro Gallery. In 1957, he received the José Loreto Arismendi Award at the XVIII Official Annual Salon of Venezuelan Art and an honorable mention at the IV São Paulo Biennial. During this time, he collaborated with the literary and artistic groups Tabla Redonda and El Techo de la Ballena, active in Caracas in the early 1960s. In the following years, alongside his pictorial work, he began his scenographic research for various theater productions.

Alongside artists such as Jesús Soto, Luis Guevara Moreno, and Régulo Pérez, among others, he represented Venezuela at the XXIX Venice Biennale in 1958. He participated in the Venezuelan stand at the Brussels World Fair and exhibited at the Official Salon in Caracas. In 1959, he took part in the exhibition "Veinte años del Salón a través de sus premios" (Twenty Years of the Salon Through Its Prizes) at the Museum of Fine Arts in Caracas. Borges was also one of the five Venezuelan painters chosen to represent Venezuela at the Palacio de Bellas Artes in Mexico. In parallel, he created scenography for the plays "Hernani" by Victor Hugo and "Esperando al Zurdo" by Clifford Odette, as well as costumes and props for "Calígula" by Albert Camus.

Borges kicks off the 1960s with the Arturo Michelena First Prize at the XVIII Arturo Michelena Salon held in Valencia, Venezuela, and an Honorable Mention at the XXI Official Annual Salon of Venezuelan Art. Shortly thereafter, he secures the first prize in the contest "Siete pintores venezolanos" (Seven Venezuelan Painters), organized by Esso at the Museum of Fine Arts in Curaçao.

In 1961, he exhibited at the XXII Official Annual Salon of Venezuelan Art in Caracas, where he was awarded the National Drawing Prize for the work "Yo también quiero ver" (I Want to See Too). He was also included in the retrospective "Pintura venezolana (1661-1961)" presented at the Museum of Fine Arts in Caracas. His work, along with that of 16 other Venezuelan painters, traveled to New York, Tel Aviv, Haifa, and Jerusalem. Simultaneously, he continued his work as a set designer, this time for Tennessee Williams' play "Zoológico de cristal" (The Glass Menagerie).

While designing the set, costumes, and program for Federico García Lorca's "Bodas de sangre" (Blood Wedding), premiered in 1962, he won the Puebla de Bolívar Prize and the Antonio Esteban Frías Prize at the XXIII Official Annual Salon of Venezuelan Art. The succession of recognitions continued the following year when he received the National Painting Prize at the XXIV Official Annual Salon of Venezuelan Art for the work "La coronación de Napoleón" (The Coronation of Napoleon) and the First Prize in Drawing and Engraving at the V Drawing and Engraving Salon of the Faculty of Architecture of the Central University of Venezuela.

His work circulated widely outside Venezuela. He was part of the exhibition "22 pintores venezolanos" (22 Venezuelan Painters), organized by the Neumann Foundation, which toured Chile, Uruguay, and Peru. He also participated again in the VII São Paulo Biennial, Brazil. In the same year, 1963, he held his third solo exhibition at the Caracas Gallery.

Starting off 1964 with a solo exhibition at the El Techo de la Ballena gallery, his work was chosen by the jury of the II Biennial of Córdoba in Argentina for a traveling exhibition through the Museum of Fine Arts in Mexico and several museums in the United States. Shortly afterward, he was included in the inaugural exhibition of the Museum of Modern Art in Bogotá and was part of the Venezuelan representation at the XXXII Venice Biennale. He also participated in the VI Exhibition of Graphic Arts, Drawing, and Engraving of the Faculty of Architecture and Urbanism of the Central University of Venezuela and in the XXV Official Annual Salon of Venezuelan Art. Critic Laurence Alloway included him in the "Guggenheim International Award" exhibition.

=== Retirement from painting and cinematic experimentation (1965–1970) ===
He initiated the series "Las jugadoras" (The Players) in 1965, the same year he participated in the VIII São Paulo Biennial and the XXVI Official Annual Salon of Venezuelan Art. He was part of the traveling exhibition "20 Artistas sudamericanos" (20 South American Artists), which later presented at the Museum of Fine Arts in Mexico, the University of California (Oakland), the American Federation of Arts in New York, and the Pan American Union in Washington. He was also included in the exhibition "Evaluación de la pintura latinoamericana" (Evaluation of Latin American Painting), which toured the Museum of Fine Arts in Caracas, the Ateneo de Caracas, and the University of Cornelly Solomon R. Guggenheim Museum in New York. Additionally, he was part of the collective exhibition "Donación Miguel Otero Silva" at the Museum of Fine Arts in Caracas.

After designing the set for Carlos Muñiz's "El tintero" (The Inkwell), he began working with a team of filmmakers, photographers, set designers, writers, musicians, and sound technicians on "Imagen de Caracas," dedicating himself to the study and experimentation of new media of expression.

Once he designs the set for Carlos Muñiz's "El tintero," he starts working with a team of filmmakers, photographers, set designers, writers, musicians, and sound artists in "Imagen de Caracas," dedicating himself to the study and experimentation of new visual communication media: film, video, photography, performance, and installation, among others. This marks the moment of his retirement as a painter: for five years, Jacobo Borges will not paint or participate in exhibitions. The major exhibitions to which he sends his paintings include: "20 South American Artists," Museum of Fine Arts, Mexico; University of California, Oakland; American Federation of Arts, New York; Pan American Union, Washington; "Circulating Exhibition, Evaluation of Latin American Painting," Museum of Fine Arts, Caracas; Ateneo de Caracas; Cornell University, USA; Guggenheim Museum, New York; Armando Reverón Biennial, Museum of Fine Arts, Caracas; Official Salon, Caracas.

As part of the "Cornell Latin American Year 1965-1966" program, Solomon R. Guggenheim Museum director Thomas M. Messer, along with Jack L. Squier from Cornell University, initiates an exhibition project. In 1964, they make two trips to eight Latin American countries in search of the most significant contemporary painters. Messer invites Borges to participate in the exhibition "The Emergent Decade: Latin American painters and painting in the 1960s," presented at the Guggenheim Museum in New York. As a result, the Guggenheim Museum acquires his work "Figura en una habitación. La comedora de helados" in 1966.

"Imagen de Caracas," a project he had been preparing for three years, is presented in 1967 under the auspices of the Government of the city of Caracas as part of the commemoration of the city's 400 years. He directs the cinematic material, theatrical development, and installation of this installation. The show takes place in a purpose-built space in the city center, covering 4,900 square meters and 20 meters in height, with tubes and scaffolding. Inside, the audience walks and interacts with projected images and moving objects. After this, in 1969, he directs a short film in 16mm format and 35 minutes in duration, titled "22 de mayo."

=== The return to painting (1971–1979) ===
His return to painting is marked by the exhibition of four series of drawings at the Viva México Gallery in 1971: "Los Novios," "Los Traidores," "La Farsa," and "El Che." His first solo exhibition at the Estudio Actual Gallery in Caracas comes in 1972. There, he presents 18 acrylics on canvas dated that year, along with "Humilde ciudadano" from 1963 and "Yo también quiero" from 1965.

Two years later, in 1974, Borges participates in the III Latin American Print Biennial in San Juan, Puerto Rico, and at the Estudio Dos Gallery in Valencia, Venezuela. He is included in the collective exhibition "Nine Venezuelan Artists," presented at the Museum of Contemporary Art in Caracas, and in the collective exhibition "Great Creators of the Continent" at the Estudio Actual Gallery in Caracas. He also designs the set for the theatrical work "El testamento del perro," directed by Álvaro de Rosson.

"Vision of Venezuela," his traveling exhibition composed of murals, photomontages, audiovisuals, and texts, arrives at the urban complex Parque Central in Caracas in 1975. Some of his colleagues in this installation include Josefina Jordán, Pedro Laya, Pepe Garrido, Raúl Fuentes, and Régulo Pérez. Afterward, he participates in the Exhibition of Venezuelan Art in Havana, Cuba. Later on, he exhibits at the Estudio Actual Gallery in Caracas, showcasing 28 works created between 1974 and 1975.

The Museum of Modern Art in Mexico, under the direction of Fernando Gamboa, invites Borges to present a retrospective of 48 works spanning the period from 1962 to 1976. The exhibition, titled "Jacobo Borges, Venezuelan Painter: Magic of Critical Realism," later moves to the Museum of Fine Arts in Caracas. The retrospective is curated by the painter and sculptor Alejandro Otero, complemented by a 30-minute audiovisual prepared by Franca Donda and Josefina Acevedo, based on a script written by José Balza, Laura Antillano, Josefina Jordán, and Humberto Mata. Simultaneously, the Arvil Gallery in Mexico City organizes an individual exhibition of his graphic work, mostly recent engravings. Argentine writer Julio Cortázar writes a short story titled "Encuentro con un círculo rojo" (Encounter with a Red Circle) inspired by one of Borges's paintings, published in catalogs in Mexico and Caracas. Cortázar's masterful handling of double meanings in his texts finds a visual equivalent in Borges's portrayal of disjunctions between past and present. Critic Marta Traba writes an essay titled "Borges bajo los focos" (Borges under the Spotlights), published in Issue No. 226 of the Revista Nacional de Cultura, Caracas, Venezuela.

In 1977, Borges not only exhibits the series "La montaña y su tiempo" (The Mountain and Its Time)

and "A la deriva" (Adrift) at the Estudio Actual Gallery in Caracas but is also included in the International Art Fair in Basel, Switzerland. He participates as a special guest in "Arte actual de Iberoamérica" (Current Art of Iberoamerica), an exhibition organized by the Instituto de Cultura Hispánica in Madrid, alongside José Luis Cuevas, Alejandro Obregón, and Fernando de Szyszlo. He is also invited to the exhibition "Homenaje a la pintura latinoamericana" (Tribute to Latin American Painting) under the auspices of the Patronato de la Cultura de El Salvador.

In 1978, the National Art Gallery dedicates an exhibition titled "Del taller de Jacobo Borges hoy" (From the Workshop of Jacobo Borges Today) to him. He participates in several group exhibitions, including "Todos los artistas al rescate de la Escuela Cristóbal Rojas" (All Artists to the Rescue of the Cristóbal Rojas School), Humanistic Center Arístides Bastidas; "Doce artistas venezolanos" (Twelve Venezuelan Artists) in the collection of the Museum of Contemporary Art, Cadafe Room of the MAC, Caracas; "Nueva imagen de Simón Bolívar" (New Image of Simón Bolívar), Ministry of Foreign Affairs, Caracas; "Arte Iberoamericano de hoy" (Ibero-American Art Today), Museum of Fine Arts, Caracas; "La Nueva Década Emergente" (The New Emerging Decade), Estudio Actual Gallery, Caracas. Continuing his ongoing interest in teamwork, he plans a mural tribute to the Nicaraguan hero Sandino along with Régulo Pérez, Claudio Cedeño, Victor Hugo Irazabal, and Pedro León Zapata. Julio Cortázar publishes "Territorios" (Siglo XXI Editores, Mexico, 1978), including the work of fourteen international artists and sculptors, among whom is Jacobo Borges.

The central and most fruitful activity for Borges in 1979 is drawing. The publication of the book "La montaña y su tiempo" by Armitano Editores, featuring his texts and drawings, sponsored by Petróleos de Venezuela, classifies him as one of the great draftsmen on the continent. The book is a testimony of a man and an artist's feelings towards the city and the mountain. It is part of the collective exhibition "Dibujo en el Continente" (Drawing in the Continent), held at the Estudio Actual Gallery, Caracas. Affirming once again his interest in cinema, video, and theater, he designs the set for the play "Los Ángeles Terribles" (The Terrible Angels) by writer and filmmaker Román Chalbaud, directed by José Ignacio Cabrujas. His work is included in the 1979 calendar of the Du Mont publishing house, Germany, alongside artists such as Max Ernst, René Magritte, and Robert Rauschenberg.

"The 80s: Caracas, Berlin, Mexico City, New York, and Southern France.

In November 1980, the creation of the Jacobo Borges Hall in the Municipal Palace is officially announced, where 40 works donated by the artist to the Municipal Council of the city of Caracas will be permanently displayed. He participates in two group exhibitions: "El Collage en Venezuela" (Collage in Venezuela), Estudio Actual Gallery, Caracas; and "Indagación de la imagen, 1680-1980" (Inquiry into the Image, 1680–1980), National Art Gallery, Caracas, Venezuela.

Following the exhibition "Dibujos en distintos tiempos y otros tantos silencios, 1953-1980" (Drawings in Different Times and Silences, 1953–1980), held at the Estudio Actual Gallery in 1981, the artist begins discussions with the American art critic Dore Ashton for an upcoming book. The National Art Gallery inaugurates the exhibition "Jacobo Borges, La Comunicación" (Jacobo Borges, Communication), which gathers his plastic production over the last four decades, covering various themes, techniques, and materials.

The book "Jacobo Borges," by Dore Ashton, published by Ediciones Armitano (Caracas), is released in 1982 in two editions, one in Spanish and another in English. The University of Texas Museum in Austin acquires one of his recent works. This happens just before he receives the Armando Reverón Award, awarded for the first time by the Venezuelan Association of Plastic Artists (AVAP). Borges is honored for being a comprehensive artist of extraordinary significance in the Venezuelan plastic and cultural sphere. In the same year, at the CDS Gallery in New York, he holds his first solo exhibition in the big city. The exhibition opens with the presentation of Ashton's book, which is introduced by Scott Meredith and Company, a significant literary agent in the United States. The show also coincides with the Latin American Week in New York.

Alongside Roberto Matta and Francisco Toledo, he attends the I Bienal de La Habana (Havana Biennial) in 1984 as a special guest held at the Wilfredo Lam Contemporary Art Center. Shortly afterward, he is part of a group exhibition at CDS Gallery featuring 50 artists from 12 countries. Jacobo Borges is the only representative from Venezuela. He is also included in the publication "America Latin. Sugesti pentru o galerie sentimental" with texts by Iordan Chimet, edited by Editura Meridiane, Bucharest, Romania.

In 1985, before creating the set and costumes for the play "Lo que dejó la tempestad" (What the Storm Left), written by César Rengifo, directed by José Ignacio Cabrujas, and presented by the National Theater Company of Caracas, Borges participates in the exhibition "Nueva Figuración" (New Figuration) at the Moss and Harcourts Gallery in San Francisco and the Yanes Gallery in Scottsdale, Arizona, alongside Sandro Chia, Philip Guston, Jim Peters, Peter Booth, and Steven Campbell. That same year, he receives a grant from the John Simon Guggenheim Foundation for outstanding intellectuals, which requires candidates with an accomplished body of work, recommended by notable personalities. Borges receives support from Thomas Messer, director of the Guggenheim Museum, Waldo Rasmussen from the Museum of Modern Art in New York, Mexican writer Carlos Fuentes, and art critic Jack Flam.

The following year, he is invited by the Deutscher Akademischer Austauschdienst (DAAD) in Berlin to work in this city, where he stays for several months. In the second half of the 1980s, he divides his time between New York, Berlin, Mexico City, Southern France, and Caracas. In collaboration with the Camerata de Caracas, he presents the musical performance exhibition "Jacobo Borges pinta a La Camerata - La Camerata ejecutada para Jacobo" at Los Espacios Cálidos of the Ateneo de Caracas. After this, he returns to the CDS Gallery in New York with his second solo exhibition in this city. He also participates in other group exhibitions in cities across the United States: Harcourt Gallery and Moss Gallery in San Francisco, California; and Yares Gallery in Scottsdale, Arizona.

"Art of the Fantastic: Latin America, 1927-1987," an exhibition organized by Holliday T. Day and Holister Sturges for the Indianapolis Museum of Art, conceived in the context of the Pan American Games held in Indianapolis in 1987, includes Borges and Armando Reverón as representatives of Venezuela among 28 other Latin American artists. This exhibition travels to The Queens Museum in New York, the Center for the Fine Arts in Miami, and the Centro Cultural de México. After this tour, the exhibition "De la pesca... al Espejo de aguas. 1956-1986" is inaugurated at the Monterrey Museum in Mexico, showcasing sixty works by the artist. The exhibition later travels to the Rufino Tamayo Museum of Contemporary Art in Mexico (1987), the Staadtiche Kunsthalle in Berlin (1987), the Museum of Modern Art in Bogotá (1988), and the Museum of Contemporary Art of Caracas Sofía Imber (1988). The artwork "Por un solo instante" is acquired by the Indianapolis Museum of Art.

During the itinerant exhibition "De La pesca... al Espejo de aguas. 1956-1986," the Staadtiche Kunsthalle in Berlin publishes the book "Jacobo Borges" in 1988, featuring a compilation of texts by Wieland Schmied, Dore Ashton, Carlos Fuentes, Julio Cortázar, Carter Ratcliff, Donald Kuspit, Marta Traba, Roberto Guevara, Edward Lucie-Smith, and Peter B. Schumann. Similarly, the Museum of Contemporary Art in Caracas publishes "De La pesca... al Espejo de aguas, 1956-1986," with texts by Carter Ratcliff and Marta Traba.

The artist is included in the exhibition "Fifty years of collecting: an Anniversary Selection. Paintings from Modern Masters," organized by the Guggenheim Museum in New York. In the same year, Borges represents Venezuela at the XLII Venice Biennale, where he receives critical acclaim. He is also included in the itinerant exhibition "The Latin American Spirit; Art and Artist in the United States, 1920-1970," organized by the Bronx Museum of Arts, New York, which later travels to the El Paso Museum of Art, Texas; The San Diego Museum of Art, California; the Institute Puerto Rican Art & Culture, Chicago; and the Center for the Arts, Vero Beach, Florida. Additionally, he participates in the exhibition "Olympiad of Arts," held during the Seoul Olympic Games in South Korea. He has his second solo exhibition in Mexico at the Arvil Gallery; the series "Puertas" (Doors) stands out among the exhibited works. He is recognized with the Order of Francisco de Miranda, First Class, by the president of the Republic of Venezuela.

In 1989, he inaugurated "Berliner Bilder", an exhibition of works painted in West Berlin. Presented at the Eva Poll Gallery, this is Borges's second solo exhibition in the former German capital. The gallery showcases internationally recognized artists such as Tadeus Maksin, Kantor, Petrick, Schametau, Rodique, Rafael Canogar, Peter Sorger, and the Equipo Crónica. After participating in the Frankfurt Fair 89, the Los Angeles Fair, and ARCO 89, he exhibits his works at the Fondo Regional de Las Artes in Marseille, France, and organizes a retrospective exhibition at the Art Museum of Florida International University, Miami. Later, the Knoxville Museum of Art, in its Works on Loan (AWOL) program, features one of his works. This program has presented works by Pieter Paul Rubens, Mary Cassatt, Pablo Picasso, Lucas Cranach, Leonardo da Vinci, Matthias Stomer, Camille Pissarro, Andy Warhol, Michael Boyd, among others. He is included in the publication "Art Diary International 1989: The World’s Art Directory," directed by Giancarlo Politi Editore, Milan, Italy.

=== The 1990s: Inauguration of the Jacobo Borges Museum ===
The Der Brücke Gallery in Buenos Aires opens the 1990s with an individual exhibition by Borges, accompanied by a catalog featuring texts by Dore Ashton. This period also sees his presentations at the Knoxville Museum of Art in Tennessee, Arco 90 in Madrid, and the Miami Fair in Florida. Damián Bayón and Roberto Pontual include him in the publication "La peinture de l’Amérique latine au XX° siècle" by Ediciones Mengès, Paris.

In 1991, the Consolidated Cultural Center of Caracas organizes "Itinerario de viaje. 1987/1990," a significant exhibition that brings together works created during the last four years abroad.

Borges is also part of the exhibition "A Propos de Romantisme Barroque" at the Fondation Vasarely in Aix-en-Provence, France, organized by the critic and writer Salvatore Lombardo.

The following year, the Eva Poll Gallery in Berlin inaugurates the exhibition "Jacobo Borges, Berliner Bilder II - Übergänge," where he presents his most recent works. On the occasion of this exhibition, a homonymous catalog with texts by Wieland Schmied is published, describing Borges's work as "a painting in which there is something of the fire of the Venezuelan heights and something of the fall of the Berlin Wall...". Subsequently, he participates in the collective exhibition "Pintura latinoamericana del siglo XX" at the Damian Bayón Center for Latin American Studies, Santa Fe, Granada, Spain.

In 1993, he is invited to the traveling exhibition "Latin American Artists of the Twentieth Century," organized by the Museum of Modern Art in New York, presented at Estación Plaza de Armas in Seville, the Georges Pompidou Museum in Paris, and the Ludwig Museum in Cologne, Germany. During this year, the El Nacional newspaper in Caracas invites him to illustrate its anniversary edition, addressing the theme of Latin American integration. Additionally, he illustrates the short novel "Aura" by Carlos Fuentes. In Spain, he presents the solo exhibition "Jacobo Borges. Pinturas" at the Damian Bayón Center for Latin American Studies, Santa Fe, Granada, Spain, and participates in a collective exhibition on Venezuela at Casa de América in Madrid. He is named Guest of Mexico City and is invited to work in the city for six months.

The Internationalen Sommerakadmie für Bladende Kunst in Salzburg, Austria, invites him to teach a course on creation and space for five weeks in 1994. These painting classes, led by him at Hohensalzburg Fortress, attract artists from various parts of the world. These successful encounters are repeated until 2006.

In the same year, he is a special guest at the Ibero-American Art Fair (FIA) in Caracas, where he participates represented by the Freites Gallery. The catalog "Jacobo Borges. La materia del tiempo" is published. He is also part of the exhibition "Maestros latinoamericanos" at the Arvil Gallery in Mexico City and contributes to the publication "Artistas latinoamericanos en su estudio," which includes an introductory text by Carlos Fuentes and texts by Marie-Pierre Colle.

In 1995, the Jacobo Borges Museum is inaugurated in Caracas, conceived as an eco-museum with an anthropological approach to culture. As part of the inaugural exhibition, the anthology "Lo humano en Jacobo Borges y en la pintura venezolana" is presented. Shortly afterward, at the Galerie imTraklhaus in Salzburg, the exhibition "Es ist die Seele ein Fremdes auf Erden..." ("Es el alma algo extraño en la tierra...") is presented, which later travels to the Galería Arvil in Mexico City and the Galería Freites in Caracas. The homonymous catalog, edited by the Internationale Sommerakademie für Bildende Kunst, is translated into German, Spanish, and English and includes texts by Wieland Schmied and an interview with the artist conducted by Barbara Wally. Borges is also mentioned in Edward Lucie-Smith's book "Art Today," published by Phaidon in London.

During another stay in Salzburg, he presents at the Residenz Galerie "Der Himmel Senkte Sich" (The sky came down), an installation of a thousand square meters in which, through paintings, sculptures, and objects, he reflects on the universal flood and the end of the millennium. The Internationale Sommerakademie für Bildende Kunst in Salzburg publishes the catalog "Jacobo Borges, Der Himmel Senkte Sich/Jacobo Borges, se vino abajo el cielo," with texts by Wieland Schmied, Marena Marquet, and Barbara Wally. He is also mentioned in Donald Kuspit's book, "Idiosyncratic Identities. Artist at the End of the Avant-Garde," edited by Cambridge University Press, New York.

After his exhibition "A Propos de Romantisme Barroque" at the Fondation Vasarely in Aix-en-Provence, France, in 1997, he decides to reinstall "Der Himmel Senkte Sich" (The sky came down) in the ruins of the Retén de Catia in 1998.

In 1999, he participates in the exhibition curated by Dore Ashton, “A Rebours, The Informal Rebellion (1939-1968)” at the Museo Nacional Centro de Arte Reina Sofía in Madrid, which later travels to the Centro Atlántico de Arte Moderno in Las

Palmas, Gran Canaria. This same year, he is included in the exhibition "América Latina: de las vanguardias al fin del milenio" at the Culturgest Cultural Center in Lisbon, Portugal. Returning to Caracas and, in his workshop and residence in the mountains south of the city, he designs and plants a forest-garden and creates a set of works with the theme of nature titled "Aproximación al paraíso perdido," presented at the Freites Gallery in Caracas. He is also included in "Art in the Turn of the Millennium," published by Taschen, offering an overview of international art from the late 20th century through the most representative artists of recent decades. Additionally, he is included in the "Petit Dictionnaire des Artistes Contemporains," published by Larousse.

=== From the 2000s to the present ===
Borges's exhibition "El Bosque" is presented at the Museum of Contemporary Art of Caracas Sofía Imber, touring the Museum of Contemporary Art of Zulia, the Adriana Schmidt Gallery in Cologne, Germany, and the Hispanic Culture Institute in Madrid. He also creates an installation as part of the II Summit of Heads of State and Government of OPEC.

Jacobo Borges is included in the book "Twentieth-Century Art of Latin America" (2001), written by Jackeline Barnitz and edited by Austin University of Texas Press. This publication examines the main trends and artists of the 20th century in Mexico, the Caribbean, and South America. Later, he designs the set for the contemporary ballet "Sand" with music by Philip Glass for the Guglisi-Foremann Dance Company, presented at The New Victory Theater in New York in 2001.

Starting in 2002, he develops the "Armony. Chrysler Project," a digital installation of photographs and videos systematically documenting, from his window, the Chrysler Building in New York. Simultaneously, he participates in the collective exhibition "Aguaria. Über die außergewöhnliche Beziehung von Wasser und Mensch" (Aquaria. About the extraordinary relationship between water and man), curated by Barbara Wally, at Landesgalerie Linz, Austria. There, he presents the installation "The Matter of Matter."

In 2004, he participates in the exhibition "Kunstankäufe des Landes Salzburg 2001-2003" at Galerie Trakhaus in Salzburg. He also exhibits the "Armony. Chrysler Project" at Galerie Eva Poll in Berlin and Latin Collector in New York. In 2006, he completes the installation "Del Sol o de la Luz," a work of 420 square meters that he started in 2003 at the Ciudad Banesco building in Caracas. Thanks to this, Banesco Banco Universal publishes "Del sol o de la luz. De la sombra de la tierra del agua del tiempo del canto," with texts by Edward Lucie-Smith and Jacobo Borges, translated into English.

In 2007, he is included in the exhibition "Arte y vida. Actions by Artists of the Americas, 1960-2000" at the Museo del Barrio in New York. He presents the series "Sala con ventana al mar" at Galería Freites in Caracas.

In 2008, he exhibits another series titled "El Color en un Observador de Hojas aserradas y Bulbos" at the same gallery. This series features his first digital works resulting from experimentation with various materials (soil, oil, and others), and he develops a digital technique called "duborcom."

In 2010, he works on "El Bosque II y lo que crece," presented at the Museum of Modern Art in Bogotá. He also exhibits "El Color en un Observador de hojas aserradas y bulbos" there. Both projects are the result of his experimentation with digital techniques, focusing on nature. After the exhibition "Paisajes de la memoria" at Galería Freites in 2011, he dedicates himself to producing film and stage material for the operatic musical "La Tempestad," by his daughter, singer Ximena Borges. It premieres at the Teatro de Chacao in Caracas in 2012 and is presented in an extended version the following year at the same venue.

In 2016, the retrospective "De las relaciones humanas al Paisaje desde el mar, 1986 – 2016" is presented at Galería Freites in Caracas, with text and curation by María Luz Cárdenas.

In 2020, Jacobo Borges presents, in digital format on the Prodavinci website, "Diary in times of pandemic," a series of videos, art, and writings reflecting on the global quarantine due to COVID-19.

In recent years, Borges has resided between Caracas and New York, working on various projects for both Venezuela and abroad.

== Legacy ==
In 1995 the government of Venezuela named a museum after Jacobo Borges. The Jacobo Borges Museum is a state funded institution located in Catia, a suburb of Caracas, Venezuela. Situated in one of the most poor neighborhoods, the museum's mission is to expose the residents to the importance of the arts. Various art classes are offered to the community in the hopes that art will help to improve their lives. For Borges, it's a personal triumph since Catia is his hometown and he himself overcame the poverty by pursuing the career in the arts. The museum exhibits works by the international artists as well as the local.

== Quote ==
I solve one part of things and then other parts suggest themselves. I work with my consciousness parallel to my subconscious in which I have great confidence. I simply let it come out. Images bud because I have them inside, not because I am reasoning. There is a need, an urge beyond control, as when I am painting and get a feeling that something belongs. I feel in touch with nature, this transfiguring mystery, because art is transfiguration. The ideal would be that art become nature once more, primary, primitive, born anew. I make things I don't plan, they just happen. My art is a dialogue between me and the world. I work like an archaeologist, always cleaning then covering up. I need layers, holes, I pile things up, then I begin to erase. I begin and conclude dialogues with my work that change from one moment to the next. Sometimes I have a discussion; there is no pleasant, easy-going relationship for me. Suddenly, I start to argue with the painting, feel angry, destroy it, then start again the dialogue with whatever I destroyed. Paintings come up like the dawn, light changes, fades and modifies. In fact, a painting is many paintings and the total dwells within me. I feel buried, hidden, non-existent images, things that we can't see any more. There is a painting I worked on for three years; it was of a singer. One night in New York, just before a show, my son Emiliano woke up and saw me working, told me I was crazy, and went back to sleep. That night, the singer became a swimming woman, then a swimming man.

- Jacobo Borges

== Selected works ==
- Fishing – 1956, Aldemaro Romero, Caracas
- Mural – 1956, Rodrigo Guerrero, Caracas
- Saint Michel's nets – 1960, Galeria de Arte Nacional, Caracas
- Without Shades – 1962, Estudio Actual, Caracas
- The Scream – 1962, Moises Feldman, Caracas
- Personages of Napoleon's coronation – 1963, Museo de Arte Contemporaneo de Caracas
- Waiting Room – 1962, Galeria de arte Nacional, Caracas
- The Crowning of Napoleon – 1963, Ana Avalos, Caracas
- Humble Citizen – 1964, Museo de Arte Contemporaneo de Caracas
- The Show Continues – 1964, Hans Neumann, Caracas
- High Finances – 1965, Private Collection, New York
- Nymphenburg – 1974, Mariano Otero, Caracas
- Time goes by I – 1974, Galeria de Arte Nacional Caracas
- Landscape in Three Tempos – 1977, Banco Central de Venezuela Caracas
- Awakening – 1978, Embassy of Venezuela, Brazil
- The Little Cup – 1981, Galeria de Arte Nacional, Caracas
- The Real Mountain – 1981, Just. W Michelsen, New York
- Animal and Destroyed Piano – 1984, CDS Gallery, New York
- Just Two – 1985, CDS Gallery, New York

== Selected exhibition history ==
- 1956 – Two solo exhibitions: Galeria Lauro, Caracas; Museo de Bellas Artes, Caracas
- 1957 – São Paulo Biennial, Brazil; Official Salon, Caracas
- 1958 – Venice Biennial; Brussels World's Fair; Official Salon, Caracas
- 1959 – Palacio de Bellas Artes, Mexico City; Official Salon, Caracas
- 1960 – Official Salon, Caracas; Museum of Fine Arts, Curaçao
- 1961 – Official Salon, Caracas
- 1962 – Official Salon, Caracas
- 1963 – Solo exhibition at Galeria G, Caracas; "Twenty two Venezuelan Painters", Chile, Uruguay, Peru; São Paulo Biennial, Brazil
- 1964 – "Guggenheim International", New York; Second Biennial in Córdoba, Argentina; Museo deArte Moderno in Bogotá, Colombia; Sixth Exhibition of Drawing and Etching at the Faculty of Architecture, Universidad Central deVenezuela, Caracas; Anniversary of the "Techo de la Ballena", Caracas; Second Biennial, Córdoba; Museo de Bellas Artes, Mexico City
- 1965–20 South American Artists, Museo de Bellas Artes, Mexico; Armando Reveron Biennial, Museo de Bellas Artes, Caracas; Galeria del Techo, Caracas
- 1966 – Ciculo-Galeria, Mérida, Mexico
- 1968 – "Image of Caracas", Caracas
- 1972 – Estudio Actual, Caracas
- 1974 – Third Biennial of Latin American Etchings, San Juan, Puerto Rico
- 1975 – "Exhibition of Venezuelan Art" Havana, Cuba; Studio Actual, Caracas
- 1976 – Retrospective exhibition (48 paintings) Museo de Arte Moderno, Mexico City
- 1977 – "New Proposals", Casa Bello, Caracas; Basle International Fair, Switzerland; *"Today's art in Latin America" Instituto de Cultura Hispanica, Madrid
- 1978 – "From Jacobo Borges Studio Today", Galeria de Arte Nacional
- 1980 – "Collage in Venezuela" Estudio Actual, Caracas; "Investigation of the Image, *1680–1980" Galeria de Arte Nacional, Caracas
- 1981 – Estudio Actual, Caracas; Galeria de Arte Nacional, Caracas
- 1983 – First solo exhibition in US – CDS Gallery, New York
- 1985 – CDS Gallery, New York
- 1986 – "From Fishing...to the Mirror of Waters. 60 Works of Jacobo Borges", Museo de Monterrey, Mexico

== Awards and honorable mentions ==
- 1952 – First prize in the Young Painting Contest organized by the newspaper El Nacional, Metro-Goldwyn-Mayer, and the Embassy of France in Venezuela .
- 1957 – José Loreto Arismendi Award from the XVIII Official Annual Salon of Venezuelan Art .
- 1957 – Honorable mention at the IV São Paulo Biennial.
- 1960 – First Arturo Michelena Prize at the XVIII Arturo Michelena Salon held in Valencia, Venezuela .
- 1960 – First prize in the Seven Venezuelan Painters competition organized by Esso at the Museum of Fine Arts in Curaçao.
- 1961 – National Drawing Award at the XXII Official Annual Salon of Venezuelan Art in Caracas.
- 1962 – Puebla de Bolívar Award and Antonio Esteban Frías Award at the XXIII Official Annual Salon of Venezuelan Art.
- 1963 – National Painting Award at the XXIV Official Annual Salon of Venezuelan Art .
- 1963 – First Prize in Drawing and Printmaking at the V Drawing and Printmaking Salon of the Faculty of Architecture of the Central University of Venezuela .
- 1980 – The Jacobo Borges Hall at the Municipal Palace, where 40 works donated by the artist to the Municipal Council of Caracas will be permanently displayed.
- 1982 – Armando Reverón Award. Granted for the first time by the Venezuelan Association of Plastic Artists (AVAP).
- 1985 – John Simon Guggenheim Foundation Fellowship for Outstanding Intellectuals .
- 1988 – Francisco de Miranda Order, First Class, presented by the President of the Republic of Venezuela .
- 1995 – Creation of the Jacobo Borges Museum in Caracas, Venezuela .
