= Avraham Melamed (politician) =

Israeli politician

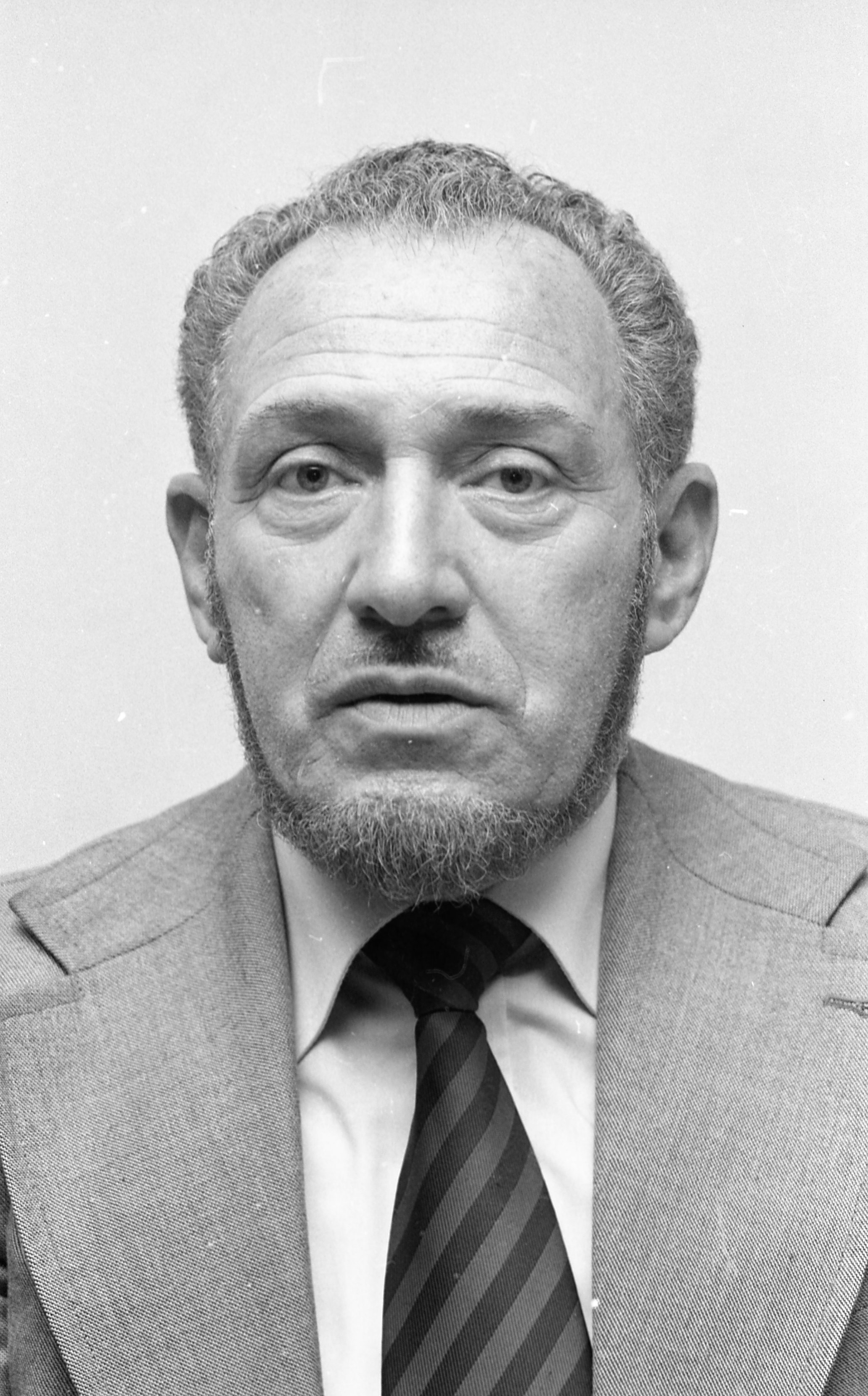
- Melamed in 1977

Faction represented in the Knesset
- 1969–1984: National Religious Party

Personal details
- Born: 7 October 1921 Lithuania
- Died: 12 December 2005 (aged 84)

Avraham Melamed (Hebrew: אברהם מלמד; 7 October 1921 – 12 December 2005) was an Israeli politician and Holocaust survivor who served as a member of the Knesset for the National Religious Party between 1969 and 1984.

== Biography ==
Born in Lithuania in 1921, Melamed was deported from the Kovno Ghetto to Dachau-Kaufering in 1944. After he was liberated from an evacuation train he became a leader among the Sherit Hapletah, the survivors of the Holocaust in Germany. He emigrated to Israel in 1948, where he joined the Palmach and fought in the Negev Brigade during the 1948 Arab-Israeli War. In 1950 he was amongst the founders of Nir Etzion, and later studied law and economics at Tel Aviv University.

He joined the National Religious Party, and was a member of its Mifne faction. He was on the party's list for the 1969 elections, and although he failed to win a seat, he entered the Knesset on 15 December that year as a replacement for Zerach Warhaftig, who had resigned his seat after being appointed Minister of Religions. He was re-elected in 1973, 1977 and 1981, before losing his seat in the 1984 elections.

He died in 2005 at the age of 84.
