= Zimbabwe at the 1980 Summer Olympics =

- IOC code: ZIM
- NOC: Zimbabwe Olympic Committee

in Moscow
- Competitors: 42 (23 men and 19 women) in 10 sports
- Flag bearer: Abel Nkhoma
- Medals Ranked 23rd: Gold 1 Silver 0 Bronze 0 Total 1

Summer Olympics appearances (overview)
- 1928; 1932–1956; 1960; 1964; 1968–1976; 1980; 1984; 1988; 1992; 1996; 2000; 2004; 2008; 2012; 2016; 2020; 2024; 2028

Zimbabwe competed at the 1980 Summer Olympics in the Soviet Union capital, Moscow. The nation, previously known as Rhodesia, had competed at three Games under that name. 42 competitors, 23 men and 19 women, took part in 30 events in 10 sports.

== Medalists ==
=== Gold ===
- Arlene Boxall, Sarah English, Maureen George, Ann Grant, Susan Huggett, Patricia McKillop, Brenda Phillips, Christine Prinsloo, Sonia Robertson, Anthea Stewart, Helen Volk, Linda Watson, Liz Chase, Sandra Chick, Gillian Cowley and Patricia Davies — Field Hockey, Women's Team Competition

== Archery ==
Zimbabwe was represented by one archer in the Archery at the 1980 Olympics, with him making his only appearance in the Olympics. In the competition David Campbell Milne finished in 34th place outscored four archers.

Men's Individual Competition:

- David Campbell Milne — 2.146 points (→ 34th place)

== Athletics ==
Zimbabwe was represented by five male athletes in the athletics at the 1980 Olympics, Zephaniah Ncube who at the time was 23 competed in his first Olympics.

Kenias Tembo competed in the 10,000 meters in what would be his only Olympics. In his heat, he would finish in 10th place which didn't get him through to the final as the top 4 got through to the final automatically with the next best three getting in.

Zimbabwe entered three in the marathon, with two of them finishing. The youngest of the three, Tapfumaneyi Jonga who would compete at the shorter events in the next Olympics finished the highest as he finished in 51st place with the gap to first place being over thirty-five minutes. Six minutes behind was Abel Nkhoma who was the last runner to finish in the marathon.

Men
Track & road events

Athlete	Event	Heat		Quarterfinal		Semifinal		Final	
Athlete	Event	Result	Rank	Result	Rank	Result	Rank	Result	Rank
Zephaniah Ncube	5000 m	14:06.7	10	did not advance					
Kenias Tembo	10000 m	30:53.8	10	did not advance					
Tapfumaneyi Jonga	Marathon	—N/a						2:47.17	51
Abel Nkhoma	Marathon	—N/a						2:53:35	53
Laswell Ngoma	Marathon	—N/a						DNS	

== Cycling ==
Three cyclists represented Zimbabwe in 1980.

Individual road race

- David Gillow
- Michael McBeath

Sprint

- John Musa

1000m time trial

- John Musa

== Diving ==
Men's Springboard

- David Parrington

- Preliminary Round — 416.67 points (→ 24th place, did not advance)

Men's Platform

- David Parrington

- Preliminary Round — 356.76 points (→ 22nd place, did not advance)

== Hockey ==
After the boycott the committee sent out invitations for other nations to join the women's competition. Zimbabwe agreed to the invitation and in their only appearance in the Olympic hockey to date, they would take out the gold medal as they shocked the whole world in taking it out. Sport historian Cathy Harris called this result a "fairytale" as the nation wouldn't get another medal until the 2004 Summer Olympics.

=== Women's team competition ===
Team roster
- Sarah English
- Maureen George
- Ann Grant
- Susan Huggett
- Patricia McKillop
- Brenda Phillips
- Christine Prinsloo
- Sonia Robertson
- Anthea Stewart
- Helen Volk
- Linda Watson
- Liz Chase
- Sandra Chick
- Gillian Cowley
- Patricia Davies

Rk	Team	Pld	W	D	L	GF	GA	Pts
1st place, gold medalist(s)	Zimbabwe	5	3	2	0	13	4	8
2nd place, silver medalist(s)	Czechoslovakia	5	3	1	1	10	5	7
3rd place, bronze medalist(s)	Soviet Union	5	3	0	2	11	5	6
4	India	5	2	1	2	9	6	5
5	Austria	5	2	0	3	6	11	4
6	Poland	5	0	0	5	0	18	0

25 July

Poland	0 – 4	Zimbabwe

27 July

Zimbabwe	2 – 2	Czechoslovakia

28 July

Soviet Union	0 – 2	Zimbabwe

30 July

India	1 – 1	Zimbabwe

31 July

Austria	1 – 4	Zimbabwe

== Sailing ==
470 class
- Jeremy O'Connor, Robin O'Connor (13th)

== Swimming ==
Men's 100m Freestyle

- Guy Goosen

- Heats — 52.87 (→ did not advance)

Men's 200m Freestyle

- Guy Goosen

- Heats — 1:56.88 (→ did not advance)

Men's 100m Butterfly

- Guy Goosen

- Heats — 56.15 (→ advance to semi)
- Semi Final — 56.35 (→ 5th place did not advance)

Women's 100m Freestyle

- Lynne Tasker

- Heats — 1:03.36 (→ did not advance)

Women's 100m Breaststroke

- Lynne Tasker

- Heats — 1:18.81 (→ did not advance)

Women's 200m Breaststroke

- Lynne Tasker

- Heats — 2:48.86 (→ did not advance)
