= List of first Olympic gold medalists by country =

The following table lists the first Olympic gold medal won by each National Olympic Committee (NOC).

James Brendan Connolly of the United States is credited as the first ever gold medalist of the modern Olympic Games.

In some cases, a NOC may garner multiple gold medals in the same edition where it won its first ever gold medal. Scheduling of events is a factor that plays a part in who is considered the first Olympic gold medalist for a nation.

- Scope: This article considers only gold medals awarded in sports competitions; gold medals from the art competitions are therefore excluded. (Note: If the gold medals awarded in the art competitions are included, the list below would change only for one country: Luxembourg at the 1924 Summer Olympics. At those Games, Jean Jacoby won the gold medal in the painting competition for Luxembourg, 28 years before his compatriot Josy Barthel won Luxembourg's first gold medal in a sports competition, in the men's 1500 metres at the 1952 Summer Olympics.)
- Key: Names in italic are national entities that no longer exist.

== Summer Olympics ==
Edition	Country	Medalist	Sport	Event	Ref.
1896 Athens	Australia	Edwin Flack	Athletics	Men's 1500 metres	
1896 Athens	Austria	Paul Neumann	Swimming	Men's 500 metre freestyle	
1896 Athens	Denmark	Viggo Jensen	Weightlifting	Men's two hand lift	
1896 Athens	Germany	Carl Schuhmann	Gymnastics	Men's vault	
1896 Athens	France	Eugène-Henri Gravelotte	Fencing	Men's foil	
1896 Athens	Great Britain	Launceston Elliot	Weightlifting	Men's one hand lift	
1896 Athens	Greece	Leonidas Pyrgos	Fencing	Men's masters foil	
1896 Athens	Hungary	Alfréd Hajós	Swimming	Men's 100 metre freestyle	
1896 Athens	Switzerland	Louis Zutter	Gymnastics	Men's pommel horse	
1896 Athens	United States	James Brendan Connolly	Athletics	Men's triple jump	
1900 Paris	Belgium	Aimé Haegeman	Equestrian	Individual jumping	
1900 Paris	Cuba	Ramón Fonst	Fencing	Men's épée	
1900 Paris	Italy	Gian Giorgio Trissino	Equestrian	High Jump	
1900 Paris	Netherlands	François Brandt; Hermanus Brockmann; Roelof Klein	Rowing	Coxed pair	
1900 Paris	Spain	José de Amézola; Francisco Villota	Basque pelota	Men's two-man teams	
1904 St. Louis	Canada	Winnipeg Shamrocks	Lacrosse	Men's team	(Note: Canadian George Orton competed at the 1900 Summer Olympics, where he won a gold medal in the men's 2500 metre steeplechase, but did so representing the United States delegation. Canada did not officially send a delegation until the 1904 Games.)
1908 London	Australasia	Australia national rugby union team: John Barnett; Phil Carmichael; Daniel Carroll; Bob Craig; Thomas Griffen; Jack Hickey; Malcolm McArthur; Arthur McCabe; Patrick McCue; Chris McKivat; Charles McMurtrie; Sydney Middleton; Tom Richards; Charles Russell; Frank Smith	Rugby Union	Men's rugby union	
1908 London	Finland	Verner Weckman	Wrestling	Men's Greco-Roman light heavyweight	
1908 London	Norway	Men's 300 metre free rifle team: Albert Helgerud; Einar Liberg; Olaf Sæther; Ole Sæther; Gudbrand Skatteboe	Shooting	Men's 300 metre free rifle, team	(Note: Norwegian Charles Ericksen and Bernhoff Hansen competed at the 1904 Summer Olympics, winning gold medals in the welterweight and heavyweight wrestling events, respectively. As representatives of an American club, their participation and medals were attributed accordingly.)
1908 London	Russian Empire	Nikolai Panin	Figure skating	Men's special figures	
1908 London	South Africa	Reggie Walker	Athletics	Men's 100 metres	
1908 London	Sweden	Oscar Swahn	Shooting	Men's single-shot running deer	
1920 Antwerp	Brazil	Guilherme Paraense	Shooting	Men's 30 m rapid fire pistol	
1920 Antwerp	Estonia	Alfred Neuland	Weightlifting	Men's 67.5 kg	
1924 Paris	Argentina	Argentina national polo team: Arturo Kenny; Juan Miles; Guillermo Naylor; Juan Nelson; Enrique Padilla	Polo	Men's polo	
1924 Paris	Czechoslovakia	Bedřich Šupčík	Gymnastics	Men's rope climbing	
1924 Paris	Uruguay	Uruguay national football team: José Andrade Pedro Arispe Pedro Cea Alfredo Ghierra Andrés Mazali José Nasazzi José Naya Pedro Petrone Ángel Romano Héctor Scarone Humberto Tomasina Antonio Urdinarán Santos Urdinarán José Vidal Alfredo Zibechi Pedro Casella	Football	Men's tournament	
1924 Paris	Yugoslavia	Leon Štukelj	Gymnastics	Men's horizontal bar	
1928 Amsterdam	Egypt	El-Sayed Nosseir	Weightlifting	Men's +82.5 kg	
1928 Amsterdam	India	India men's national field hockey team: Richard Allen; Dhyan Chand; Michael Gateley; William Goodsir-Cullen; Leslie Hammond; Feroze Khan; George Marthins; Rex Norris; Broome Pinniger; Michael Rocque; Frederic Seaman; Ali Shaukat; Jaipal Singh; Kher Singh Gill	Field hockey	Men's team	
1928 Amsterdam	Ireland	Pat O'Callaghan	Athletics	Men's hammer throw	
1928 Amsterdam	Japan	Mikio Oda	Athletics	Men's triple jump	
1928 Amsterdam	New Zealand	Ted Morgan	Boxing	Welterweight	
1928 Amsterdam	Poland	Halina Konopacka	Athletics	Women's discus throw	
1936 Berlin	Turkey	Yaşar Erkan	Wrestling	Men's Greco-Roman featherweight	
1948 London	Jamaica	Arthur Wint	Athletics	Men's 400 metres	
1948 London	Mexico	Humberto Mariles; Rubén Uriza; Alberto Valdés	Equestrian	Individual jumping Team Jumping	
1948 London	Peru	Edwin Vásquez	Shooting	Men's 50 metre pistol	
1952 Helsinki	Luxembourg	Josy Barthel	Athletics	Men's 1500 metres	
1952 Helsinki	Romania	Iosif Sîrbu	Shooting	Men's 50 metre rifle prone	
1952 Helsinki	Soviet Union	Nina Ponomaryova	Athletics	Women's discus throw	
1956 Melbourne	Bulgaria	Nikola Stanchev	Wrestling	Men's freestyle middleweight	
1956 Melbourne	Iran	Emamali Habibi	Wrestling	Men's freestyle lightweight	
1960 Rome	Ethiopia	Abebe Bikila	Athletics	Men's marathon	
1960 Rome	Pakistan	Pakistan men's national field hockey team: Abdul Hamid Abdul Rashid Abdul Waheed Bashir Ahmad Ghulam Rasul Anwar Khan Khursheed Aslam Habib Ali Kiddie Manzoor Hussain Atif Munir Dar Mushtaq Ahmad Motiullah Naseer Bunda Noor Alam	Field hockey	Men's team	
1964 Tokyo	Bahamas	Durward Knowles; Cecil Cooke	Sailing	Star	
1968 Mexico City	East Germany	Christoph Höhne	Athletics	Men's 50 kilometres walk	
1968 Mexico City	West Germany	Ingrid Becker	Athletics	Women's pentathlon	
1968 Mexico City	Kenya	Naftali Temu	Athletics	Men's 10,000 m	
1968 Mexico City	Tunisia	Mohammed Gammoudi	Athletics	Men's 5000 metres	
1968 Mexico City	Venezuela	Francisco Rodriguez	Boxing	Men's light flyweight	
1972 Munich	North Korea	Ri Ho-jun	Shooting	Mixed 50 metre rifle prone	
1972 Munich	Uganda	John Akii-Bua	Athletics	Men's 400 metres hurdles	
1976 Montreal	South Korea	Yang Jung-mo	Wrestling	Men's freestyle 62 kg	
1976 Montreal	Trinidad and Tobago	Hasely Crawford	Athletics	Men's 100 metres	
1980 Moscow	Zimbabwe	Zimbabwe women's national field hockey team: Arlene Boxall; Sarah English; Maureen George; Ann Grant; Susan Huggett; Patricia McKillop; Brenda Phillips; Christine Prinsloo; Sonia Robertson; Anthea Stewart; Helen Volk; Linda Watson; Liz Chase; Sandra Chick; Gillian Cowley; Patricia Davies	Field hockey	Women's tournament	
1984 Los Angeles	China	Xu Haifeng	Shooting	Men's 50 m pistol	
1984 Los Angeles	Morocco	Nawal El Moutawakel	Athletics	Women's 400 metres hurdles	
1984 Los Angeles	Portugal	Carlos Lopes	Athletics	Men's marathon	
1988 Seoul	Suriname	Anthony Nesty	Swimming	Men's 100 metre butterfly	
1992 Barcelona	Algeria	Hassiba Boulmerka	Athletics	Women's 1500 metres	
1992 Barcelona	Indonesia	Susy Susanti (Note: Badminton player Alan Budikusuma also won a gold medal in the men's single event on the same date Susanti won the first gold for Indonesia. The men's singles final was scheduled after the women's single event.)	Badminton	Women's singles	
1992 Barcelona	Lithuania	Romas Ubartas	Athletics	Men's discus throw	
1996 Atlanta	Armenia	Armen Nazaryan	Wrestling	Men's Greco-Roman 52 kg	
1996 Atlanta	Belarus	Ekaterina Karsten	Rowing	Women's single sculls	
1996 Atlanta	Burundi	Vénuste Niyongabo	Athletics	Men's 5000 metres	
1996 Atlanta	Costa Rica	Claudia Poll	Swimming	Women's 200 metre freestyle	
1996 Atlanta	Croatia	Croatia men's national handball team: Patrik Ćavar; Slavko Goluža; Božidar Jović; Nenad Kljaić; Venio Losert; Valter Matošević; Alvaro Načinović; Goran Perkovac; Iztok Puc; Zlatko Saračević; Irfan Smajlagić; Bruno Gudelj; Zoran Mikulić; Vladimir Jelčić; Valner Franković; Vladimir Šuster	Handball	Men's tournament	
1996 Atlanta	Czech Republic	Štěpánka Hilgertová	Canoeing	Women's slalom	
1996 Atlanta	Ecuador	Jefferson Pérez	Athletics	Men's 20 kilometres walk	
1996 Atlanta	Hong Kong	Lee Lai Shan	Sailing	Women's mistral	
1996 Atlanta	Kazakhstan	Yuriy Melnichenko	Wrestling	Men's Greco-Roman 57 kg	
1996 Atlanta	Nigeria	Chioma Ajunwa	Athletics	Women's long jump	
1996 Atlanta	Russia	Stanislav Pozdnyakov	Fencing	Men's sabre	
1996 Atlanta	Russia	Olga Klochneva	Shooting	Women's 10 metre air pistol	
1996 Atlanta	Serbia and Montenegro	Aleksandra Ivošev	Shooting	Women's 50 metre rifle three positions	
1996 Atlanta	Slovakia	Michal Martikán	Canoeing	Men's slalom C-1	
1996 Atlanta	Syria	Ghada Shouaa	Athletics	Women's heptathlon	
1996 Atlanta	Thailand	Somluck Kamsing	Boxing	Featherweight	
1996 Atlanta	Ukraine	Vyacheslav Oleynyk	Wrestling	Men's Greco-Roman 90 kg	
2000 Sydney	Azerbaijan	Zemfira Meftahatdinova	Shooting	Women's skeet	
2000 Sydney	Colombia	María Isabel Urrutia	Weightlifting	Women's 75 kg	
2000 Sydney	Cameroon	Cameroon men's national football team: Patrice Abanda; Nicolas Alnoudji; Clément Beaud; Daniel Bekono; Serge Branco; Joël Epalle; Lauren; Samuel Eto'o; Carlos Kameni; Modeste M'bami; Patrick Mboma; Albert Meyong; Serge Mimpo; Daniel Ngom Kome; Aaron Nguimbat; Geremi Njitap; Patrick Suffo; Pierre Wome	Football	Men's tournament	
2000 Sydney	Latvia	Igors Vihrovs	Gymnastics	Men's floor exercises	
2000 Sydney	Mozambique	Maria Mutola	Athletics	Women's 800 m	
2000 Sydney	Slovenia	Rajmond Debevec	Shooting	Men's 50 metre rifle three positions	
2000 Sydney	Slovenia	Iztok Čop Luka Špik	Rowing	Men's double sculls	
2000 Sydney	Uzbekistan	Mahammatkodir Abdoollayev	Boxing	Light welterweight	
2004 Athens	Chile	Fernando González; Nicolás Massú	Tennis	Men's doubles	
2004 Athens	Dominican Republic	Félix Sánchez	Athletics	Men's 400 metres hurdles	
2004 Athens	Georgia	Zurab Zviadauri	Judo	Men's 90 kg	
2004 Athens	Israel	Gal Fridman	Sailing	Men's mistral one design	
2004 Athens	Chinese Taipei	Chen Shih-hsin	Taekwondo	Women's 49 kg	
2004 Athens	Chinese Taipei	Chu Mu-yen	Taekwondo	Men's 58 kg	
2004 Athens	United Arab Emirates	Ahmad Al Maktoum	Shooting	Men's double trap	
2008 Beijing	Mongolia	Naidangiin Tüvshinbayar	Judo	Men's 100 kg	
2008 Beijing	Panama	Irving Saladino	Athletics	Men's long jump	
2012 London	Bahrain	Maryam Yusuf Jamal	Athletics	Women's 1500 metres	(Note: Middle-distance runner Maryam Yusuf Jamal was retroactively awarded a gold medal in 2017 due to doping violations that affected the results of the Women's 1500 metres race. Originally, runner Rashid Ramzi won the Men's 1500 metres race in 2008, but he was stripped of his gold medal the following year after he tested positive for the blood-booster CERA. Before Jamal was upgraded to gold, for one year Bahrain's first gold medalist was Ruth Jebet, winning the Women's 3000 metres steeplechase in 2016.)
2012 London	Grenada	Kirani James	Athletics	Men's 400 metres	
2012 London	Serbia	Milica Mandić	Taekwondo	Women's +67 kg	
2016 Rio de Janeiro	Ivory Coast	Cheick Sallah Cisse	Taekwondo	Men's 80 kg	
2016 Rio de Janeiro	Fiji	Fiji national rugby sevens team: Jasa Veremalua; Kitione Taliga; Semi Kunatani; Leone Nakarawa; Osea Kolinisau; Jerry Tuwai; Samisoni Viriviri; Apisai Domolailai; Josua Tuisova; Viliame Mata; Vatemo Ravouvou; Savenaca Rawaca	Rugby sevens	Men's tournament	
2016 Rio de Janeiro	Jordan	Ahmad Abu-Ghaush	Taekwondo	Men's 68 kg	
2016 Rio de Janeiro	Kosovo	Majlinda Kelmendi	Judo	Women's 52 kg	
2016 Rio de Janeiro	Kuwait	Fehaid Al-Deehani (Note: Kuwaiti athletes competed as Independent Olympians, as the Kuwait Olympic Committee was suspended by the International Olympic Committee due to governmental interference.)	Shooting	Men's double trap	
2016 Rio de Janeiro	Puerto Rico	Monica Puig	Tennis	Women's singles	
2016 Rio de Janeiro	Singapore	Joseph Schooling	Swimming	Men's 100 m butterfly	
2016 Rio de Janeiro	Tajikistan	Dilshod Nazarov	Athletics	Men's hammer throw	
2016 Rio de Janeiro	Vietnam	Hoàng Xuân Vinh	Shooting	Men's 10 m air pistol	
2020 Tokyo	Bermuda	Flora Duffy	Triathlon	Women's individual	
2020 Tokyo	Philippines	Hidilyn Diaz	Weightlifting	Women's 55 kg	
2020 Tokyo	Qatar	Fares Ibrahim	Weightlifting	Men's 96 kg	
2024 Paris	Botswana	Letsile Tebogo	Athletics	Men's 200 metres	
2024 Paris	Dominica	Thea LaFond	Athletics	Women's triple jump	
2024 Paris	Guatemala	Adriana Ruano	Shooting	Women's trap	
2024 Paris	Saint Lucia	Julien Alfred	Athletics	Women's 100 metres	

== Winter Olympics ==
Edition	Country	Medalist	Sport	Event	Ref.
1924 Chamonix	Austria	Herma Szabo	Figure skating	Ladies' singles	
1924 Chamonix	Canada	Canada men's national ice hockey team (Toronto Granites): Jack Cameron; Ernie Collett; Bert McCaffrey; Harold McMunn; Duncan Munro; Beattie Ramsay; Cyril Slater; Reginald "Hooley" Smith; Harry Watson	Ice hockey	Men's competition	
1924 Chamonix	Finland	Clas Thunberg	Speed skating	Men's 5000 m	
1924 Chamonix	Great Britain	Great Britain national curling team: William Jackson Thomas Murray Robin Welsh Laurence Jackson	Curling (Note: Curling in the 1924 Games was considered a demonstration sports by the International Olympic Committee. Curling was retroactively recognized as a regular sport for the 1924 games by the IOC in 2006. Prior to 2006, Great Britain's first Winter Olympic gold medal was the one won by the Great Britain men's national ice hockey team in 1936.)	Men's event	
1924 Chamonix	Norway	Thorleif Haug	Cross-country skiing	Men's 50 km	
1924 Chamonix	Sweden	Gillis Grafström	Figure skating	Men's singles	
1924 Chamonix	Switzerland	Switzerland national military patrol team: Adolf Aufdenblatten; Alphonse Julen; Antoine Julen; Denis Vaucher	Military patrol	Men's event	
1924 Chamonix	United States	Charles Jewtraw	Speed skating	Men's 500 m	
1928 St. Moritz	France	Andrée Joly; Pierre Brunet	Figure skating	Pairs	
1936 Garmisch-Partenkirchen	Germany	Christl Cranz	Alpine skiing	Women's combined	
1948 St. Moritz	Belgium	Micheline Lannoy; Pierre Baugniet	Figure skating	Pairs	
1948 St. Moritz	Italy	Nino Bibbia	Skeleton	Men's individual	
1956 Cortina d'Ampezzo	Soviet Union	Lyubov Kozyreva	Cross-country	Women's 10 km	
1964 Innsbruck	Netherlands	Sjoukje Dijkstra	Figure skating	Ladies	
1968 Grenoble	Czechoslovakia	Jiří Raška	Ski jumping	Men's normal hill	
1968 Grenoble	East Germany	Klaus-Michael Bonsack; Thomas Köhler	Luge	Men's doubles	
1968 Grenoble	West Germany	Franz Keller	Nordic combined	Men's individual	
1968 Grenoble	West Germany	Erhard Keller	Speed skating	Men's 500m	
1972 Sapporo	Japan	Yukio Kasaya	Ski jumping	Normal hill individual	
1972 Sapporo	Poland	Wojciech Fortuna	Ski jumping	Large hill individual	
1972 Sapporo	Spain	Francisco Fernández Ochoa	Alpine skiing	Men's slalom	
1980 Lake Placid	Liechtenstein	Hanni Wenzel	Alpine skiing	Women's giant slalom	
1992 Albertville	South Korea	Kim Ki-hoon	Short track speed skating	Men's 1000 metres	
1994 Lillehammer	Kazakhstan	Vladimir Smirnov	Cross-country skiing	Men's 50 km (classical)	
1994 Lillehammer	Russia	Aleksandr Golubev	Speed skating	Men's 500 m	
1994 Lillehammer	Ukraine	Oksana Baiul	Figure skating	Women's singles	
1994 Lillehammer	Uzbekistan	Lina Cheryazova	Freestyle skiing	Women's aerials	
1998 Nagano	Bulgaria	Ekaterina Dafovska	Biathlon	Women's individual	
1998 Nagano	Czech Republic	Czech Republic men's national ice hockey team: Jan Čaloun; Roman Čechmánek; Jiří Dopita; Roman Hamrlík; Dominik Hašek; Milan Hejduk; Milan Hnilička; Jaromír Jágr; František Kučera; Robert Lang; David Moravec; Pavel Patera; Libor Procházka; Martin Procházka; Robert Reichel; Martin Ručinský; Vladimír Růžička; Jiří Šlégr; Richard Šmehlík; Jaroslav Špaček; Martin Straka; Petr Svoboda	Ice hockey	Men's competition	
2002 Salt Lake	Australia	Steven Bradbury	Short track speed skating	Men's 1000 m	
2002 Salt Lake	China	Yang Yang	Short track speed skating	Women's 500 m	
2002 Salt Lake	Croatia	Janica Kostelić	Alpine skiing	Women's combined	
2002 Salt Lake	Estonia	Andrus Veerpalu	Cross-country skiing	Men's 15 km	
2010 Vancouver	Belarus	Alexei Grishin	Freestyle skiing	Men's aerials	
2010 Vancouver	Slovakia	Anastasiya Kuzmina	Biathlon	Women's sprint	
2014 Sochi	Latvia	Latvia national four-man bobsleigh team: Oskars Melbārdis Arvis Vilkaste Daumants Dreiškens Jānis Strenga	Bobsleigh	Four-man	
2014 Sochi	Slovenia	Tina Maze	Alpine skiing	Women's downhill	
2018 Pyeongchang	Hungary	Hungary men's national short track speed skating team: Csaba Burján Viktor Knoch Shaoang Liu Shaolin Sándor Liu	Short track speed skating	Men's 5000 metre relay	
2022 Beijing	New Zealand	Zoi Sadowski-Synnott	Snowboarding	Women's slopestyle event	
2026 Milan–Cortina d'Ampezzo	Brazil	Lucas Pinheiro Braathen	Alpine skiing	Men's giant slalom	

== See also ==
- List of first Olympic medalists by National Olympic Committee
- All-time Olympic Games medal table
- Olympic sports
