= British diaspora in Africa =

People of British descent in Africa

- Flag of the British African Front

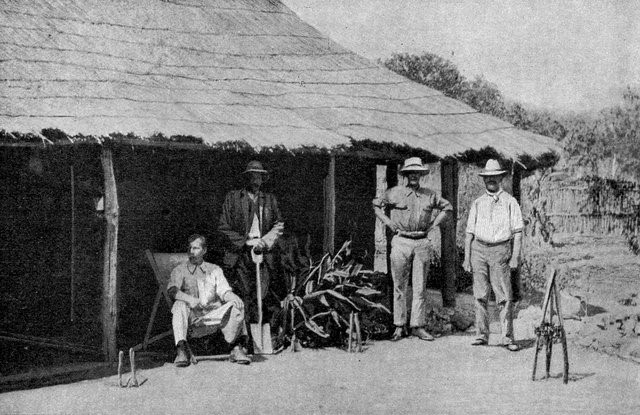
- British settlers in Southern Rhodesia, 1922

Total population
- 1.7–1.75 million

Regions with significant populations
- South Africa: 1,603,575
- Zambia: 40,000
- Kenya: 32,000
- Zimbabwe: 24,888
- Namibia: 3,764

Languages
- First language English; Second or third language Afrikaans · Bantu languages • Khoisan languages · European languages

Religion
- Anglicanism · Protestantism · Roman Catholicism · Judaism · Irreligion

Related ethnic groups
- British · English · Scottish · Irish · Welsh · Ulster-Scots · Afrikaners · Coloureds

The British diaspora in Africa is a population group broadly defined as English-speaking people of British descent who live in or were born in the African continent. The majority live in South Africa and other Southern African countries in which English is a primary language, including Zimbabwe, Namibia, Kenya, Botswana and Zambia. Their first language is usually English. The term 'British diaspora in Africa' is usually used to refer to White Africans of British ancestry

== History ==
=== Colonialism ===
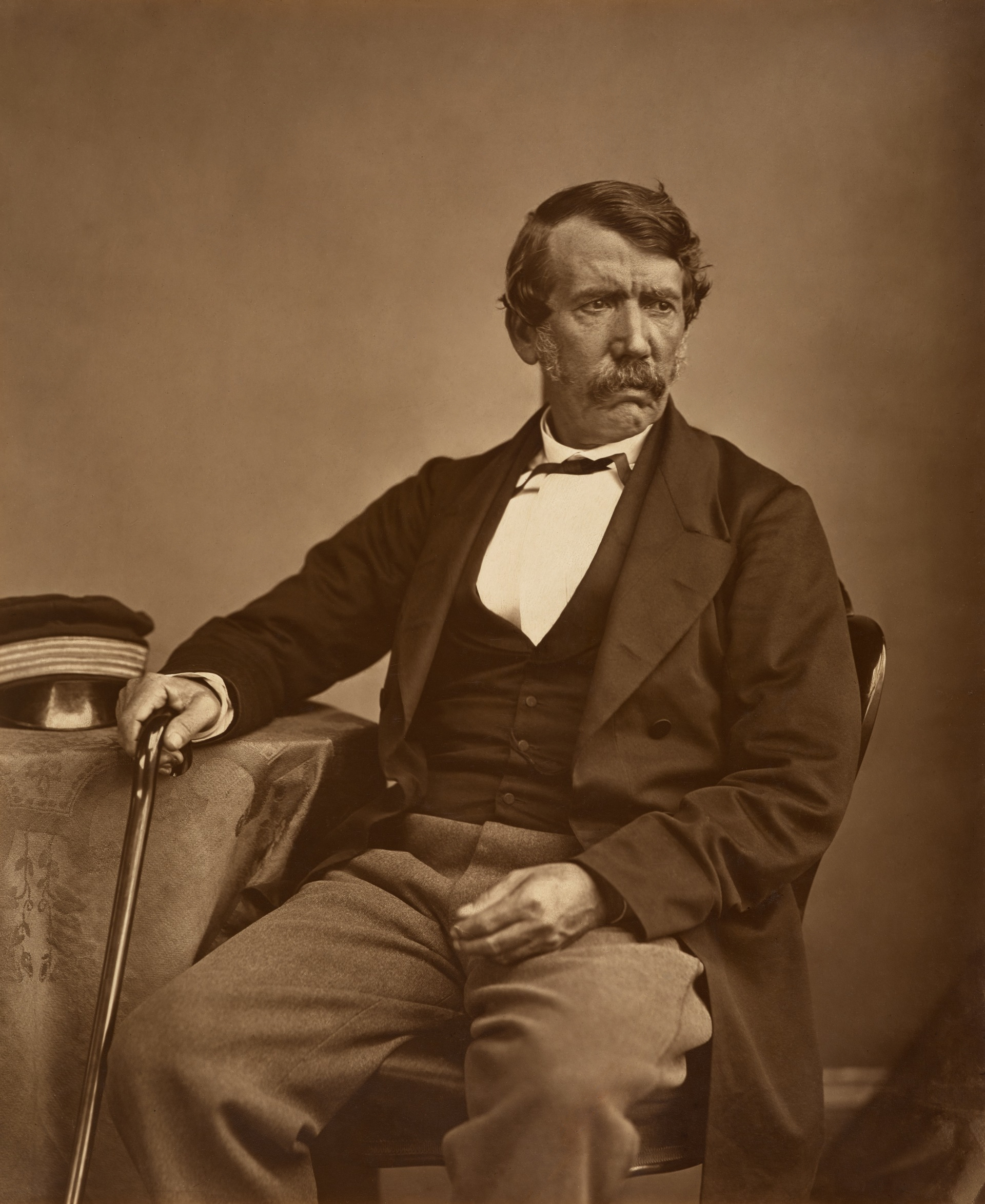
David Livingstone (taken in 1864) left Britain for Africa in 1840

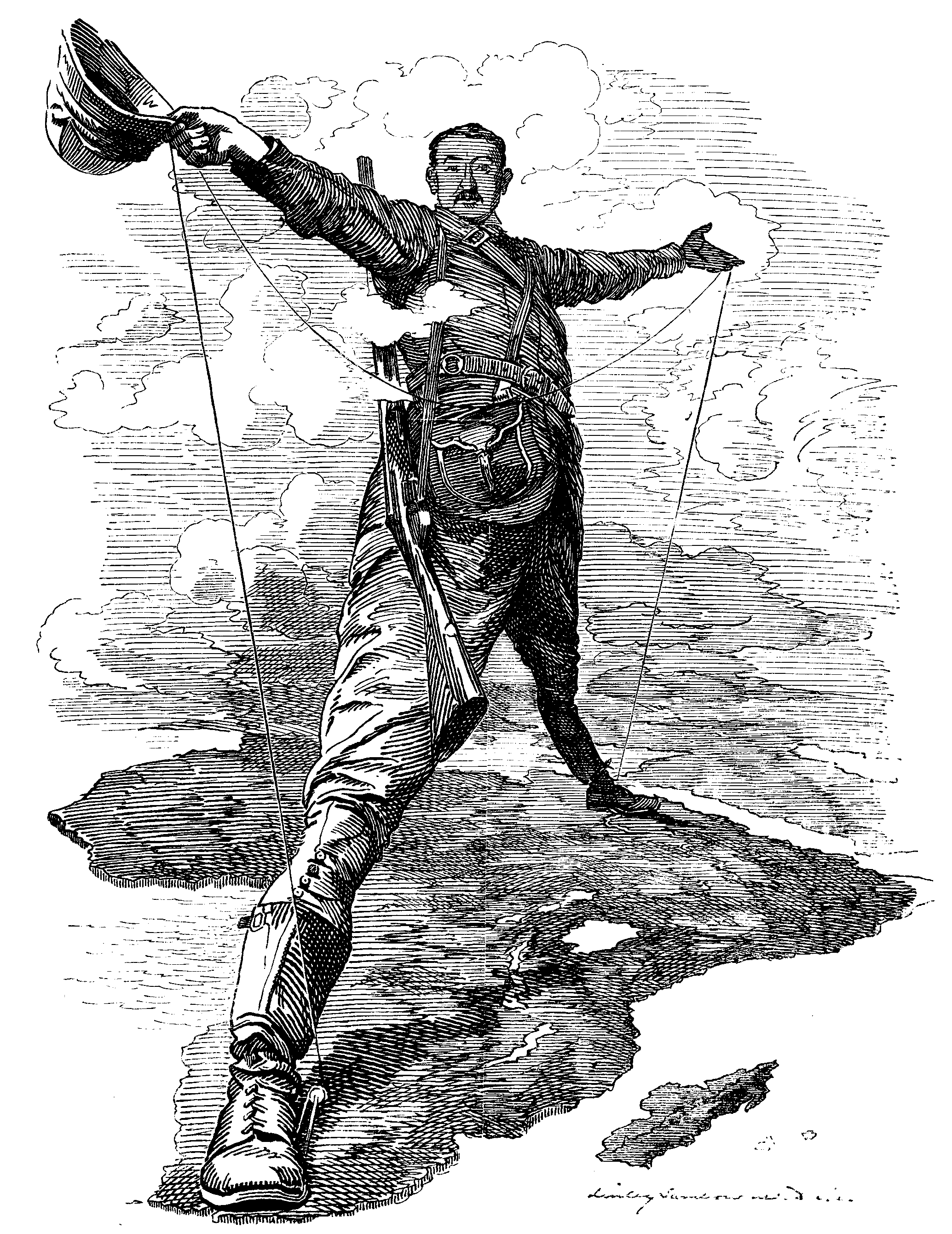
Cecil Rhodes planned to link Cape Town to Cairo

Although there were earlier British settlements at ports along the West African coast to facilitate the British Atlantic slave trade, more permanent British settlement in Africa did not begin in earnest until the end of the eighteenth century, at the Cape of Good Hope in Southern Africa. British settlement in the Cape gained momentum following the second British occupation of the Dutch Cape Colony in 1806. The government encouraged British settlers in Albany ("Settler Country") in 1820 in order to consolidate the British Cape Colony's eastern frontier during the Cape Frontier Wars against the Xhosa. The Crown proclaimed Natal in southeastern Africa as a British colony in 1843. Following the defeat of the Boers in the Second Boer War in 1902, Britain annexed the Boer Republics of the Transvaal Republic and the Orange Free State.

Scottish medical missionary David Livingstone became known for his exploration of the African continent. He is believed to have been the first European to set eyes on Victoria Falls in 1855. He is a key character in African history, being one of the first well-known Britons to believe his heart was in Africa.

In the late nineteenth century, the discovery of gold in the Witwatersrand and diamonds in Kimberley encouraged further settlement by the British, Australians, New Zealanders, Americans and Canadians. The search for mineral resources also drove expansion north. Mining magnate Cecil Rhodes dreamed of a British Africa linked from Cape Town to Cairo. The British South Africa Company, which he founded in 1889, controlled the territory named Rhodesia after him; this later became known as (Southern) Rhodesia and Northern Rhodesia (now Zimbabwe and Zambia, respectively). Simultaneously, British settlers began expansion into the fertile uplands (the "White Highlands") of British East Africa (now Kenya).

As a result of the rise of nationalist and anti-colonial movements throughout the British Empire, in the aftermath of World War II decolonisation of Africa took place. Ethnic Africans were overwhelmingly the majority of population in the British colonies and protectorates and had long been denied equivalent political and economic power. These former colonies eventually became self-governing. The Cold War powers entered into the conflicts in this period. Often aided by Soviet expertise and weapons, black nationalist guerrilla forces such as the Mau Mau in Kenya, ZANU in Rhodesia and MK in South Africa fought for majority rule, which normally meant "one man, one vote".

=== Zimbabwe ===
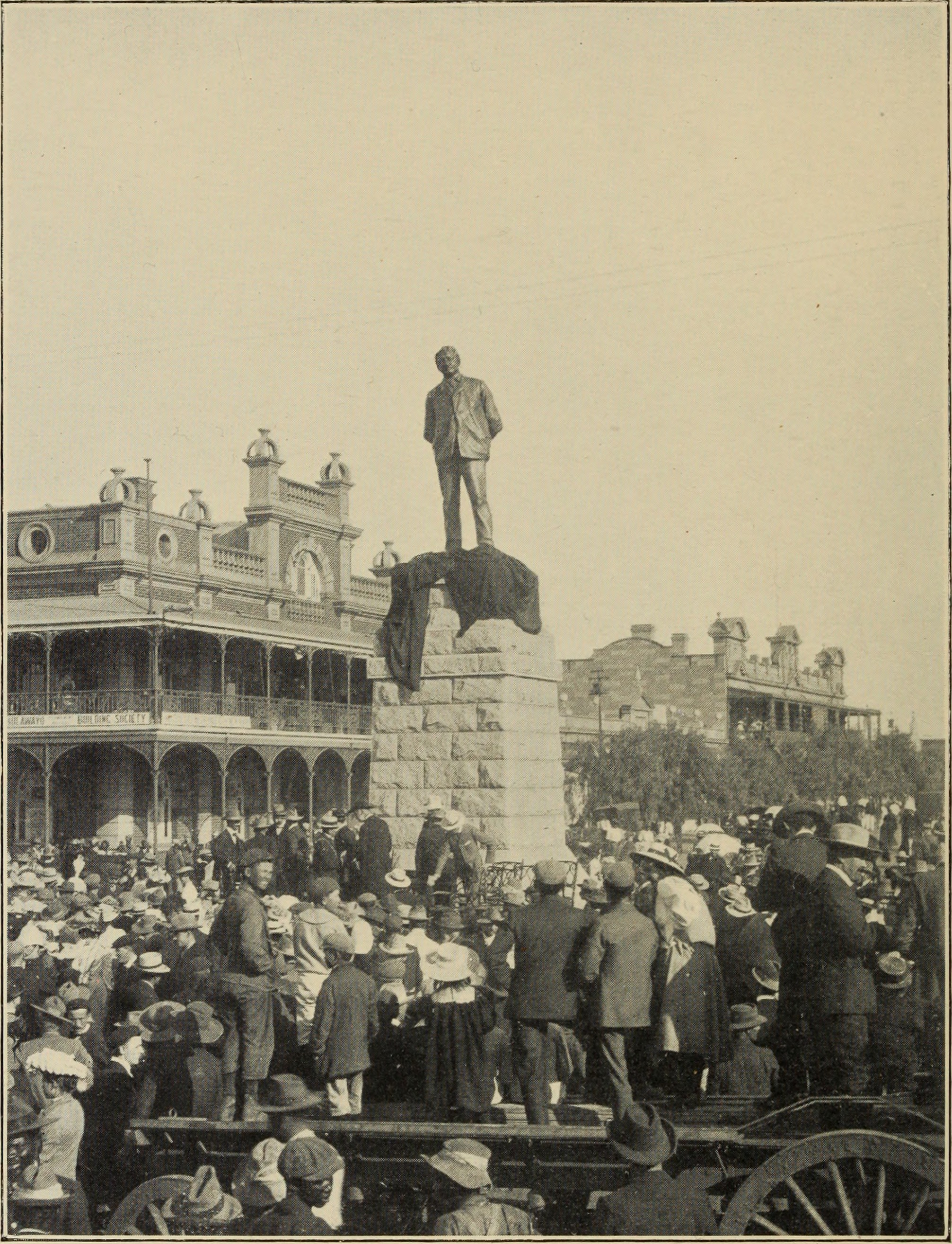
Unveiling a statue of Cecil Rhodes in Bulawayo in 1909

The ruling white minority in Southern Rhodesia unilaterally declared independence as Rhodesia in 1965 but no provisions were made to incorporate the Indigenous African majority as political equals. Civil war lasted until 1979, as black nationalists fought against the white-dominated government. In 1980, the first democratic general election was held in what was now independent Zimbabwe and the country joined the Commonwealth. Subsequently, the country's white population declined sharply – thousands were intimidated, attacked, and driven off their property. Because of patterns of discrimination, whites had held the majority of property previously occupied by indigenous groups. Charged with abusing human rights and undermining democracy, President Robert Mugabe and other Zimbabwean individuals and entities were subjected to a wide range of economic and political sanctions by the United States and other western nations.

In 2002 Zimbabwe was suspended from the Commonwealth due to human rights abuses and electoral fraud. In 2003, Zimbabwe voluntarily terminated its Commonwealth membership.

Northern Rhodesia became a separate nation, Zambia.

=== South Africa ===
English-speaking South Africans (ESSA) Anglo-South Africans
- The South African "Red Ensign", the national flag of the Union of South Africa prior to 1928

Total population
- 1,603,575

Languages
- South African English (ethnic language)

Religion
- Christianity

Related ethnic groups
- White Zimbabweans, White Zambians, White people in Kenya

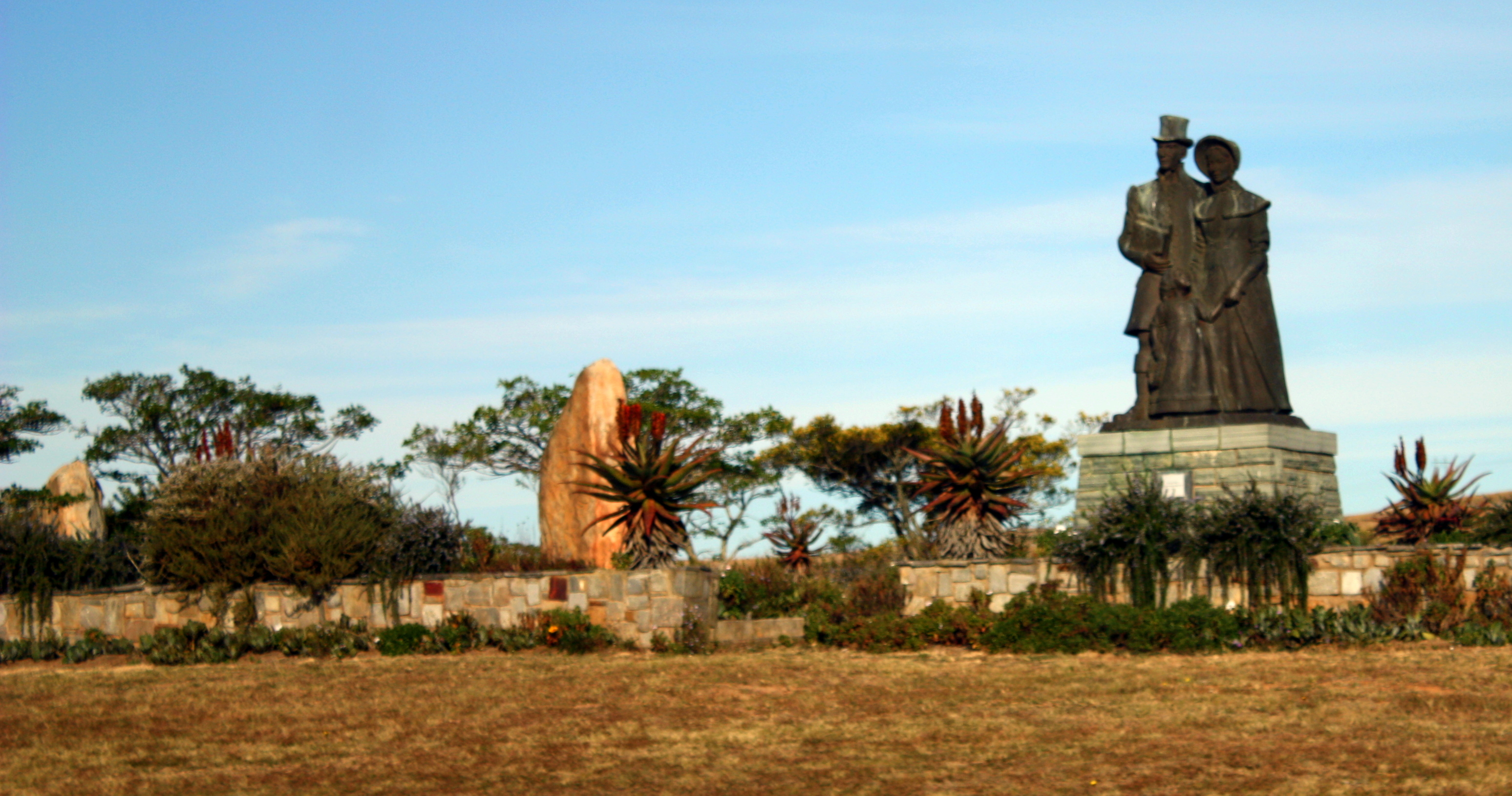
The 1820 Settlers National Monument in Grahamstown, South Africa

==== White minority rule ====
In 1910, the two separate British colonies and two Boer republics in Southern Africa united to form the Union of South Africa, which was governed as a constitutional monarchy within the British Empire under white minority rule. In 1926, the Balfour Declaration ended the oversight of the Dominions from Britain, leading South Africa to become a founding member of the Commonwealth of Nations, as a realm. Five years later, the Act of the Statute of Westminster formalized this full sovereignty. The majority of the British diaspora supported the United Party, led by J. B. M. Hertzog and Jan Smuts, while it was the ruling party between 1934 and 1948, and its various successors up to the Democratic Party, the predecessor of the Democratic Alliance. The United Party favoured close relations with the United Kingdom and the Commonwealth, unlike the Nationalists.

The Afrikaners, who solely ruled the country from 1948 to 1994, entrenched a system of racial segregation known as apartheid, established a republic in 1961, and withdrew from the Commonwealth. In 1955, 33,000 Dutch (34.8%), Germans (33.7%), French (13.2%), people of colour (7%), British (5.2%), unknown origin (3.5%), other Europeans (2.6%) in Natal, which had an English-speaking majority of white voters, signed the Natal Covenant against the establishment of a republic. Many of the British diaspora voted "No" in the 1960 referendum of white voters, but it was approved by a narrow margin and resulted in the establishment of a republic. The Natal majority voted against the republic and some residents called for secession from the Union after the referendum.

==== Democracy ====
In 1994, South Africa held its first universal democratic general election, marking the end of apartheid and white minority rule, and rejoined the Commonwealth. The majority of the British diaspora support the Democratic Alliance, which is the official opposition to the ruling African National Congress and an increasingly multiracial party.

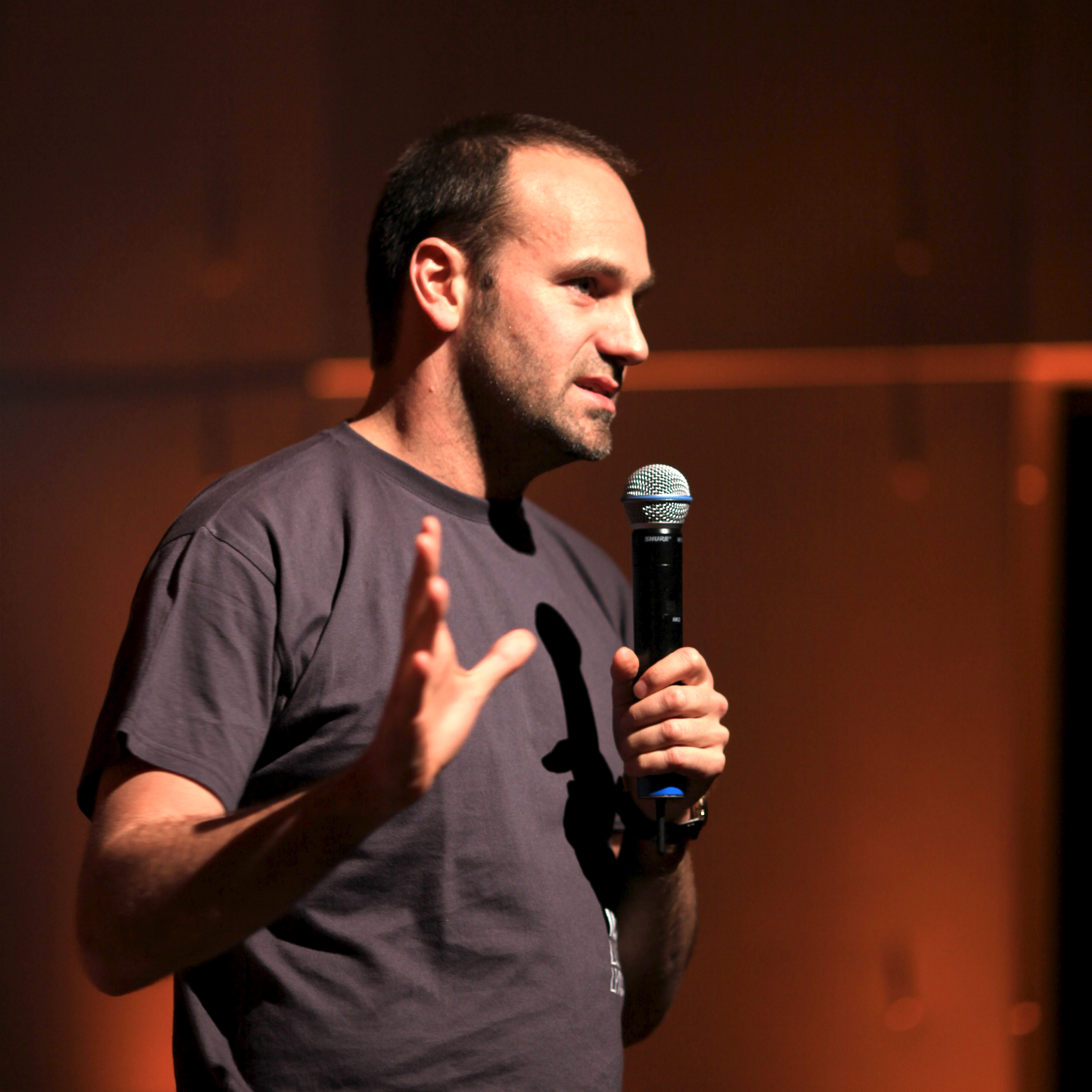
Mark Shuttleworth is the first South African in space

The British diaspora population declined starting in the early 1990s as a result of a low birth rate relative to that of other population groups and emigration. Reasons for emigration included crime, corruption, poor service delivery and affirmative action. A crude estimate of the British diaspora population is the number of white South Africans who speak English as a first language, representing 1.6 million people, 36% of the white population group and 3% of the total population in the South African National Census of 2011. This number is an overstatement as it includes people of other ancestral origins who have assimilated into the white English-speaking population. The English-speaking population is largest in the KwaZulu-Natal province and in cities such as Johannesburg and Cape Town.

Despite the high emigration rate, many people of British descent continue to settle in South Africa, including many South African-born people who have returned home since the late-1990s, especially after the 2008 global economic crisis. South Africa has been a top destination for British retirees, and many White Zimbabweans of British descent settled in South Africa after Zimbabwean independence; some as a result of forced removal from their property. Over 200,000 British citizens live in South Africa, including more than 38,000 people who are being paid a UK State Pension.

=== Global presence ===
A significant number of the British diaspora in Africa have emigrated to other Commonwealth countries such as the United Kingdom, Australia, New Zealand and Canada. Others have settled in countries such as the United States, Ireland and France.

== Culture ==
White Africans generally enjoy the outdoors lifestyle and sports. The braai is a popular way to get together with friends and family. Other popular pastimes include: visiting game reserves, hiking, camping and recreational fishing. There is a particular appreciation of country life and farming. Farmers themselves generally prefer holiday houses at the coast. In other ways, the culture of the British diaspora derives from their British ancestry. Afternoon tea – in fact, tea at any time of day – is still widespread as are hobbies such as gardening and reading. Families who live in rural areas are usually familiar with horseriding and shooting. White South African culture was encapsulated in the 1970s Chevrolet radio jingle "Braaivleis, rugby, sunny skies and Chevrolet" based on the United States slogan "Baseball, hot dogs, apple pie and Chevrolet". Nationwide television in South Africa was only introduced as lately as 1976, and many older South Africans of British descent had little exposure to British television and humour as a result of an Equity union ban on British television programme sales to South Africa under apartheid.

=== Language ===
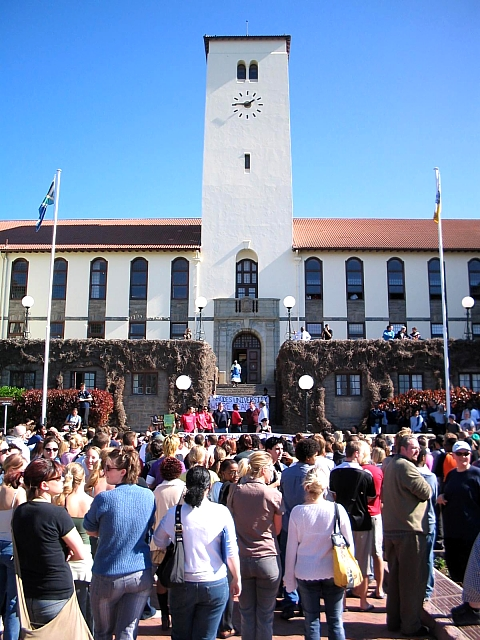
Heart of the Rhodes University campus

Many White Africans speak a unique dialect of English, developed by interaction with other local languages. South African English is influenced by British English, Dutch, Afrikaans, Bantu languages, Khoisan languages, Malay and languages of India. The considerable Dutch and Afrikaans influence can be seen from words such as braai, trek, lekker and ja in common usage. Some Zulu and Xhosa words, such as shongololo, muti, ubuntu and fundi (meaning an "expert"), are also commonly used. South African slang is used by many younger South Africans, with older people not using it regularly. The common greeting "howzit!" comes from the Afrikaans hoezit! (or "how is it?"); it can be likened to the US "howdy", the Canadian "hey, eh?" or the Australian "g'day".

Zimbabwean English (ZimEng) shares many similarities with southern hemisphere English dialects (Australian, New Zealand, and South African), yet is distinct from its closest relative, South African English. Traditionally Zimbabwean English was predominately influenced by British English, with the minor influence of Afrikaans (compared to South Africa) and Indigenous African languages, generally used to describe flora and fauna, with terms such as kopje, dassie and bundu (Shona for bush). This dialect came to be known as Rhodesian English, typified by speakers such as Prime Minister Ian Smith and P.K. van der Byl. After Zimbabwean independence from the UK in 1980, this dialect sharply fell out of favour and came to be regarded as an archaic, non-productive dialect, only spoken by the oldest generation of White Zimbabweans (including nostalgic Rhodies and whenwes). Zimbabwean English evolved with the changing social, economic and political conditions in which Blacks and Whites interacted in Zimbabwe; with the old, conservative Rhodesian accent being effectively replaced by the more neutral and prestigious sounding cultivated private school accent, which ironically retains some of its features. Today, the main languages spoken in are English, Shona and Ndebele. Only 3.5%, mainly the White, Indian, coloured (mixed race) and foreign-born minorities, consider English their native language. The vast majority of English speakers are Black Zimbabweans, who are bilingual or even trilingual with Bantu languages, such as Shona (75%), Ndebele (18%) and the other minority languages, and thus these speakers have an outsize role in influencing the direction of Zimbabwean English, despite traditional native speakers maintaining an important influence.

Much like Australian, New Zealand and South African English, spoken English exists on a continuum from broad, general to cultivated (broad and general accents), based on an individual's background particularly, class and income and historically, ethnicity. Affluent, middle class and highly educated Zimbabweans speak in a cultivated accent, influenced by older forms of southern British English, the now archaic Rhodesian English and South African English. The cultivated accent is sometimes humorously mocked by other speakers for its nasality and alleged pretentiousness, with speakers derided as the so-called nose brigades. Robert Mugabe, Brendan Taylor, Pommie Mbangwa, Dave Houghton and journalists Peter Ndoro and Sophie Chamboko are notable speakers of a cultivated accent. Rural and urban working class speakers, on the other hand are heavily influenced by their native languages (these groups are also mocked as SRBs whose accents betray their strong rural background. Lower middle class black Zimbabweans are generally the most prominent in the mainstream media, fall in a spectrum between the two accents. Speakers of this general Zimbabwean accent include Morgan Tsvangirai, Evan Mawarire, Simba Makoni and Tatenda Taibu. English is spoken by virtually all in the cities, but less so in rural areas. Today English, the official language, enjoys status dominance and is the language of instruction in education, commerce, the government and the majority of the media.

Rhodes University in Grahamstown houses the Dictionary Unit for South African English. The fourth edition of A Dictionary of South African English was published in 1991, and the second edition of the Oxford South African Concise Dictionary was published in 2010. The English Academy of Southern Africa, founded in 1961, is dedicated to promoting the effective use of English as a dynamic language in Southern Africa.

A few South African English coinages are listed below:

bru	male friend, from Afrikaans broer meaning "brother"
(my) china	(my) friend, from Cockney "china plate" which is rhyming slang for "mate"
just now, now now	an amount of time, could be anything from 5 seconds to 24 hours, could be past or future tense, from the Afrikaans net-nou and nou-nou (e.g. "He went out just now." or "I'll be done with it now now.")
no	common speech disfluency or filler
oke	male friend, either shortened from bloke or from the Afrikaans diminutive outjie (oldie, used as a term of affection much like 'guy' in English, with English pronunciation approximating 'oakie')
robot	traffic light
sarmie	sandwich
scheme	to think, as in the expression, "What are you scheming?" asked of a person deep in thought (e.g. "I scheme we should go home now.")
shot	thank you
takkies	running shoes
tune	to talk to someone in a derogatory way (e.g. "Are you tuning me?")

=== Literature ===
The British diaspora in Africa has a long literary tradition, and has produced a number of notable novelists and poets, including Doris Lessing, Olive Schreiner, Guy Butler and Roy Campbell. A traditional South African storybook is Percy FitzPatrick's Jock of the Bushveld, which describes his journey as a wagon driver with his dog Jock. Other significant African writers of British descent are: Nadine Gordimer, Alan Paton, Peter Godwin, Alexandra Fuller and Bryce Courtenay.

=== Arts ===
The British diaspora has influenced modern African arts, and has often incorporated other African cultures. Athol Fugard is a significant playwright. Born of an Irish Catholic father and an Afrikaner mother, he has always described himself as an Afrikaner but he wrote in English to reach a larger audience. Sharlto Copley is a significant film actor, producer and director. He starred in the Oscar-nominated science fiction film District 9, which was an international box office hit and received widespread critical acclaim. District 9 drew heavily on metaphoric references to South Africa's apartheid history as well as including many other more direct references to South African and other African culture. Despite being of British descent, Copley plays an Afrikaner bureaucrat who experiences a similar oppression to that he once imposed on alien refugees. He also starred in the film remake of the 1980s television show The A-Team.

=== Music ===
Notable African musicians of British descent include: Dave Matthews, who emigrated to the United States, and Johnny Clegg. Wrex Tarr performed the distinctly Rhodesian comedy song "Cocky Robin" based on Chilapalapa. John Edmond was a popular singer, songwriter, entertainer and storyteller during the Rhodesian Bush War. Seether is a post-grunge band founded by South Africans, which now includes Americans.

=== Education ===
The British diaspora and their forebears have been extensively involved in the founding and development of numerous educational institutions across Africa.

==== Universities ====
There are four universities in South Africa that were established by the British diaspora, which admitted limited numbers of Black students under apartheid. The South African College was founded in 1829 and later split into the University of Cape Town and the South African College Schools. The University of Natal merged with the University of Durban-Westville to form the University of KwaZulu-Natal. The University of the Witwatersrand was founded in Kimberley in 1896 as the South African School of Mines and is now based in Johannesburg. Finally, Rhodes University was established in 1904 with an initial grant from the Rhodes Trust.

==== Schools ====
There are two categories of schools founded by the British diaspora or British missionaries, those originally intended for the education of the children of the British diaspora and those founded for the education of the indigenous population.

The first category includes both notable private schools such as St. George's College in Harare, Peterhouse Boys' School in Marondera, the Diocesan College in Cape Town, the Wykeham Collegiate in Pietermaritzburg and St John's College in Johannesburg and prestigious government schools such as Maritzburg College in Pietermaritzburg, King Edward VII School in Johannesburg and Prince Edward School in Harare.

The second category of schools includes South African institutions such as the Lovedale educational institution in the Eastern Cape, which was responsible for the education of many notable Africans including Thabo Mbeki, Chris Hani and Seretse Khama, Tiger Kloof Educational Institute in the North West province, and St Matthew's High School outside Keiskammahoek in the Eastern Cape. Many of these institutions were adversely impacted by the Bantu Education Act of 1953, and the Historic Schools Restoration Project championed by former Anglican Archbishop of Cape Town Njongonkulu Ndungane aims to transform under-resourced historically significant schools into sustainable centres of cultural and educational excellence.

=== Sport ===
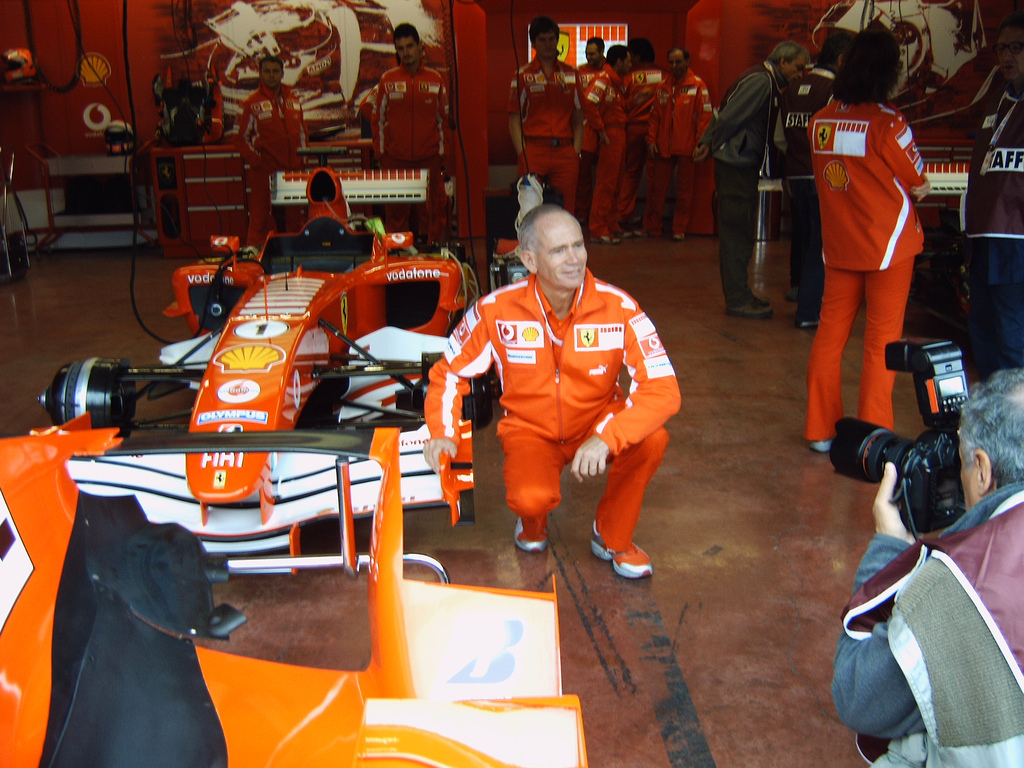
Rory Byrne with Michael Schumacher's car for the 2005 Formula One season

Cricket, football, rugby union, rugby league, tennis, golf and cycling are generally considered to be the most popular sports among the British diaspora.

Cricket in Africa and particularly Zimbabwe has been dominated by the people of British heritage. Up until recently, the majority of Zimbabwean players were from the British diaspora, including: Andy Flower, Heath Streak, Brendan Taylor and Ray Price. Cricket in South Africa also traditionally features the British diaspora, including former national Test captain Graeme Smith and bowler Shaun Pollock. The England cricket team has often included many players of Southern African heritage in their ranks such as brothers Sam Curran and Tom Curran, Gary Ballance and Andrew Strauss. The England cricket team of 2010 that retained the 2010–11 Ashes series in Australia, for example, received significant contributions from South African captain Andrew Strauss, wicketkeeper Matt Prior, batsman Kevin Pietersen, batsman Jonathan Trott and coach Andy Flower.

A few examples of the notable contributions of the British diaspora to South African rugby union are those made by Kitch Christie, the coach who led the Springboks to victory in the 1995 Rugby World Cup, Bobby Skinstad and Percy Montgomery, the Springboks' all-time leader in appearances and points.

Members of the British diaspora have also had notable success in African rallying, while former Rhodesia in particular produced several world champion motorcycle road racers including Jim Redman and Kork Ballington.

Four-time Tour de France winner Chris Froome was born in Kenya, and grew up in South Africa.

== Alternative names ==
I do see very clearly that there may come a time, and that time not very remote, when the Australian colonies may be brought more into the position of one great and united people. I do see a time when the South African colonies may be brought together into one great Anglo-African people. And I see that if a grand and powerful congeries of free communities, such as I have grouped, in three parts of the world, become steadily formed, they may enter into an allegiance with the parent State, on something like a broad ground of equality.

— Henry Parkes (1815–1896), advocate of the Australian Federation, after writing about the formation of the Dominion of Canada

The majority of white South Africans and Zimbabweans identify themselves as primarily South African and Zimbabwean respectively, regardless of their first language or ancestry. The term English-speaking South African (ESSA) is sometimes used to distinguish anglophone South Africans from the rest of the population, particularly Afrikaners. Additionally, the inclusive term Zimbo or Anglo-Zimbabweans are terms sometimes used by academics to distance themselves, from the Rhodesian era, though the latter term overlaps with and can cause confusion with the large community of Britons of Zimbabwean descent. Along with Anglo African these terms are somewhat analogous to those used in other English-speaking countries such as White Anglo Saxon Protestant, English Canadian, Anglo-Celtic Australian and English New Zealander.

Colloquial terms for the British in Africa which are considered derogatory include the Afrikaans term rooinek (literally "red neck", probably from the stereotype that they sunburn relatively easily although unrelated to the American term redneck), the Australian term pommy, 'Beberu' in Kenya which means he-goat.

The term Anglo-African has been used historically to describe people living in the British Empire in Africa, although it has also been used to self-identify by people of mixed British and indigenous African ancestry. The Anglo-African Who's Who and Biographical Sketch-Book published in London in 1905 contains details of prominent British and Afrikaner people in Africa at that time.

'Cape Brit' is another term sometimes used to refer to South Africans of British descent. It refers to the Cape Colony where the immigrants to whom many South Africans can trace their origins from settled during its time as British colony. The term is considered an equivalent of 'Cape Dutch'.

== Notable Africans of British descent ==
=== Explorers, politicians, civil servants, military personnel, businesspeople and clergy ===
- Roy Bennett (1957–2018), Zimbabwean politician
- Verney Lovett Cameron (1844–1894), explorer
- Rob Davies (born 1948), South African Member of Parliament
- Rufane Shaw Donkin (1773–1841), founder of Port Elizabeth
- Ronald Reid-Daly (1928-2010), military officer who founded the Selous Scouts
- Simon Rudland (born 1971), businessman
- Tim Harris (born c. 1979), Shadow Minister of Finance in South Africa
- Emily Hobhouse (1860–1926), welfare campaigner
- Albert Gerald Lewis (1918-1982), RAF fighter pilot and fighter ace
- Angus Graham, 7th Duke of Montrose, (1907-1992), Rhodesian politician, farmer and aristocrat
- Beryl Markham (1902-1986), aviator, adventurer, horse-trainer and author
- Bruce Murray, 12th Duke of Atholl (born 1960), South African businessman, peer and chief of Clan Murray
- Trevor Huddleston (1913–1998), Anglican archbishop, anti-apartheid activist and Isitwalandwe Medallist
- Sir Leander Starr Jameson (also known as "Doctor Jim", 1853–1917), medical doctor and colleague of Cecil Rhodes
- Lucy Lloyd (1834–1914), philologist and explorer
- William Lloyd (1802–1881), Anglican clergyman
- Harry Johnston (1858–1927), explorer and civil servant
- Dick King (1813–1871), transport rider
- John Kirk (1832–1922), leader of Kenya settlers
- John Frost, (1918-1942), RAF fighter ace
- Henry Everard, (1897-1980), politician, railway engineer and executive
- David Livingstone (1813–1873), medical missionary and explorer
- David Coltart (born 1957), Zimbabwean lawyer, Christian leader and politician serving as the Mayor of Bulawayo
- Chelsy Davy (born 1985), Zimbabwean businesswoman
- Clifford Dupont, (1905-1978), politician
- Caesar Hull, (1914-1940), RAF flying ace
- Charles Patrick Green, (1914-1999), RAF pilot
- Colin Eglin (1926-2013), politician
- John X. Merriman (1841–1926), last Prime Minister of the Cape Colony
- John Dering Nettleton (1917-1943), RAF officer
- E. D. Morel (1873–1924), British journalist, author and socialist politician
- Nicholas Mostyn (born 1957), British judge
- Elon Musk (born 1971), Internet and technology entrepreneur and founder of SpaceX and Tesla Motors
- Neville Bowker, (1918-2005), third high-scoring RAF ace for Southern Rhodesia during WW2
- Nicky Oppenheimer (born 1945), chairman of De Beers
- Megan Coleman (born 1985), businesswoman, beauty pageant holder, crowned Miss South Africa 2006 who represented South Africa at Miss Universe 2007 and Miss World 2007
- Mungo Park (1771–1806), explorer
- Cecil Rhodes (1853–1902), businessman and politician
- Guy Scott (1944-2026), Vice President of Zambia
- Godfrey Huggins, 1st Viscount Malvern (1883-1971), politician, physician and fourth prime minister of Southern Rhodesia
- Gerald Stapleton, (1920-2010) RAF officer, pilot and fighter ace
- Frederick Selous (1851–1917), explorer after whom the Selous Scouts were named
- Theophilus Shepstone (1817–1893), Zulu language interpreter and civil servant
- Mark Shuttleworth (born 1973), Internet entrepreneur, founder of Thawte and Canonical Ltd., space tourist
- Peter Walls (1927-2010), soldier and Head of the Armed Forces Of Rhodesia
- Pat Pattle (3 July 1914 – 20 April 1941), RAF fighter pilot and ace
- Harry Smith (1787–1860), Governor of the Cape Colony and founder of Ladysmith, which he named after his wife
- Ian Smith (1919–2007), former RAF pilot, farmer, politician and Prime Minister of Rhodesia, or Southern Rhodesia, from 1964 to 1979
- John Wrathall (1913-1978), politician and chartered accountant
- Kate Nicholl (born 1988), politician and 79th Lord Mayor Of Belfast
- Ken Sharpe (born 1973), businessman, philanthropist and real estate developer
- Richard Southey (1808–1901), Colonial Secretary and Treasurer, Lieutenant-Governor of Griqualand-West
- Henry Morton Stanley (1841–1904), colleague of David Livingstone
- Geordin Hill-Lewis (born 1986), politician
- George Steer (1909–1944), British journalist notable for his coverage of various conflicts during the 1930s and early 1940s
- Grahame Wilson Rhodesian Army Officer and Wildlife conservationist
- Edwin Swales, V.C. (1915–1945), pilot killed in World War II
- Allan Wilson (1856–1893), leader of the Shangani Patrol, the African equivalent of Custer's Last Stand

=== Authors, poets, conservationists, academics and journalists ===
- Allan MacLeod Cormack (1924–1998), physicist
- Allan Savory (born 1935), ecologist, soldier, farmer, rancher and politician
- Jani Allan (1952-2023), journalist
- William Boyd (born 1952), writer
- Wendy Woods (1941-213) educator and anti-apartheid activist
- Robert Broom (1866–1951), doctor and paleontologist
- Guy Butler (1918–2001), author, poet and playwright
- Roy Campbell (1901–1957), poet
- Jack Cope (1913–1991), author
- Joan Root (1936-2006), Wildlife conservationist, ecological activist and filmmaker
- Bryce Courtenay (1933–2012), author
- Robyn Curnow (born 1972), journalist
- Alex Crawford (born 1963), journalist
- Richard Dawkins (born 1941), evolutionary biologist, author of The God Delusion
- Iain Douglas Hamilton (born 1942-2025), zoologist
- Ivan Carter, Wildlife conservationist, professional safari guide and photographer
- John Edmond (born 1936), folk singer
- Percy FitzPatrick (1862–1931), transport rider and author
- Philippa Gregory (born 1954), author
- Philippa Langley (born 1962), writer, producer and Ricardian
- Tony Fitzjohn (1945-2022), Wildlife conservationist and author
- Bruce Fordyce (born 1955), ultra-marathon runner
- Athol Fugard (1932-2025), author, actor and playwright
- Alexandra Fuller (born 1969), author
- Paula Hawkins (born 1972), author
- Peter Godwin (born 1957), author and journalist
- Nadine Gordimer (1923–2014), author, anti-apartheid activist and winner of 1991 Nobel Prize in Literature
- A. C. Grayling (born 1949), philosopher and academic
- William Hamilton (1891–1917), poet killed in World War I
- Glynn Isaac (1937–1985), palaeoanthropologist
- George Adamson (1906-1989), Wildlife conservationist and author
- Kevin Richardson (born 1974), known as "The Lion Whisperer", Wildlife conservationist and sanctuary owner
- Lawrence Anthony (born 1950-2012), Wildlife conservationist, environmentalist, explorer and author, Known as "The Elephant Whisperer"
- Louis Leakey (1903–1972), palaeoanthropologist
- Mary Leakey (1913–1996), palaeoanthropologist
- Richard Leakey (born 1944), palaeoanthropologist and conservationist
- Doris Lessing (1919–2013), author
- David Lewis-Williams (born 1934), archaeologist
- Daphne Sheldrick (1934-2018), Wildlife conservationist, author and expert in Animal husbandry
- Donald Woods (1933-2001), journalist and anti-apartheid activist
- Alan Paton (1903–1988), author
- David Grey Rattray (1958–2007), historian
- Olive Schreiner (1855–1920), author
- Wilbur Smith (1933-2021), author
- Allister Sparks (1933-2016), investigative journalist, former editor of The Rand Daily Mail, Nieman Fellow and political commentator
- Edward Stourton (born 1957), journalist
- Eugene Cussons (1979-2026), primatologist, director of Chimp Eden and host of Animal Planet's Escape to Chimp Eden
- Winston Sterzel travel vlogger, documentary maker and businessman
- J. R. R. Tolkien (1892–1973), author

=== Sportspeople, musicians and actors ===
- Anne Grant (born 1955), hockey player
- Anthea Stewart (born 1944), hockey player
- Adam Croasdell (born 1980), actor
- Charlene, Princess of Monaco (born 1978), Olympic swimmer
- Alistair Campbell (born in 1972), former cricketer and captain
- Cara Black (born 1979), tennis player
- Saffron (born Samatha Sprackling), lead singer of Republica
- Kork Ballington (born 1951), motorcycle road racer
- Rory Byrne (born 1944), engineer and Formula One car designer
- Mike Catt (born 1971), rugby player
- Kitch Christie (1940–1998), rugby coach who took the Springboks to victory in the 1995 Rugby World Cup
- Johnny Clegg (also known as "The White Zulu", 1953–2019), musician
- Jessica Haines (born 1978), actress
- Jodi Balfour (born 1986), actress
- Sharlto Copley (born 1973), film actor, producer and director
- Sean Cameron Michael (born 1969), actor, writer and singer
- Sarah English (born 1955), hockey player
- Susan Huggett (born 1954), hockey player
- Sandra Chick (born 1947), hockey player
- Kirsty Coventry (born 1983), Africa's most decorated Olympic swimmer, politician, sports administrator, the first Female and first African president of the International Olympic Committee
- Kevin Curren (born 1958), tennis player
- Kaylene Corbett ( born 1999), swimmer
- Andy Flower (born 1968), cricketer, coach of England's national cricket team
- Grant Flower (born 1970), brother of Andy Flower, cricket coach and former cricketer
- Guy Whittall (born 1972), former cricketer
- Gillian Cowley (born 1955), hockey player
- Chris Froome (born 1985), cyclist
- Chris Martin (born 1977), vocalist, pianist and co-founder of Coldplay.
- Craig Ervine (born 1985), cricketer
- Richard E. Grant (born 1957),

actor, director and screenwriter

- Butch James (born 1979), rugby player
- Brooke Bruk-Jackson (born 2002), Zimbabwean model and beauty pageant holder who won Miss Zimbabwe 2023 and represented Zimbabwe at Miss Universe 2023
- Brendan Taylor (born 1986), cricketer and former captain
- Byron Black (born 1969), tennis and Davos Cup player
- Watkin Tudor Jones (born 1974), rapper, music producer, satirist, Die Antwoord lead vocalist
- Andrew Lincoln (born 1971), actor
- Dave Matthews (born 1967), musician
- David Houghton (born 1957), cricket coach and former cricketer
- David Bailie (1947-2021), actor
- Alexander McCall Smith (born 1948), author
- Miriam Stockley (born 1962), singer
- Mark McNulty (born 1953), golfer
- Murray Goodwin (born 1972), former cricketer
- Maureen George (born 1955), field hockey player
- Mary-Anne Barlow (born 1974), actress
- Miles Anderson (born 1947), stage and screen actor
- Meganne Young (born 1990), actress and director
- Natasha Sutherland (born 1970), actress
- Percy Montgomery (born 1974), rugby player
- Patricia Davies (born 1956), hockey player
- Fiona Ramsay, actress
- Gordon Murray (born 1946), Formula One car designer
- Gemma Griffiths, singer-songwriter and podcaster
- Steve Nash (born 1974), basketball player
- Sonia Robertson (born 1947), hockey player
- Tasmin Pepper (born 1990), race driver and sister of Jordan Pepper
- Kevin Pietersen (born 1980), cricketer
- Gary Player (born 1935), golfer
- Graeme Pollock (born 1944), cricketer
- Shaun Pollock (born 1973), cricketer
- Sean Williams (born 1986), cricketer
- Nick Price (born 1957), golfer
- Neil Johnson (born 1970), former cricketer
- Patricia McKillop (born 1956), hockey player
- Ray Price (born 1976), cricketer
- Linda Watson (born 1955), hockey player
- Liz Chase (born 1950-2018), hockey player
- Louise Barnes (born 1974), actress
- Langley Kirkwood (born 1973), actor
- Matt Prior (born 1982), cricketer
- Jim Redman (born 1931), motorcycle road racer
- Barry Richards (born 1945), cricketer
- Jonty Rhodes (born 1969), cricketer
- Rory Sabbatini (born 1976), golfer
- Ryan Burl (born 1994), cricketer
- Bobby Skinstad (born 1976), rugby player
- Heath Streak (1974-2023), cricketer
- Graeme Smith (born 1981), cricketer
- Jordy Smith (born 1988), professional surfer
- Jessica Sutton (born 1993), actress
- Winston Sterzel travel vlogger, documentary maker and businessman
- Andrew Strauss (born 1977), cricketer
- Wrex Tarr (1934–2006), comedian
- Wayne Black (born 1973), tennis coach and player
- Anya Taylor-Joy (born 1996), actress
- Clem Tholet (1948–2004), folk singer
- Jonathan Trott (born 1981), cricketer
- Hugo Weaving (born 1960), actor
- Roger Whittaker (1936–2023), musician
