= Linda Watson =

Linda Watson may refer to:

- Linda Watson (field hockey) (born 1955), Zimbabwean field hockey player
- Linda Watson (soprano) (born 1956), American operatic soprano
