= International cricket in 1983 =

International cricket season

The 1983 International cricket season was from May 1983 to August 1983.

== Season overview ==
International tours
Start date	Home team	Away team	Results [Matches]			
Start date	Home team	Away team	Test	ODI	FC	LA
14 July 1983	England	New Zealand	3–1 [4]	—	—	—
International tournaments
Start date	Tournament				Winners	
9 June 1983	(England) (Wales) 1983 Cricket World Cup				India	

== June ==
=== Prudential World Cup 1983 ===
Pos	Team	Pld	W	L	T	NR	Pts	RR
1	England	6	5	1	0	0	20	4.671
2	Pakistan	6	3	3	0	0	12	4.014
3	New Zealand	6	3	3	0	0	12	3.927
4	Sri Lanka	6	1	5	0	0	4	3.752

Source: ESPNcricinfo

Pos	Team	Pld	W	L	T	NR	Pts	RR
1	West Indies	6	5	1	0	0	20	4.308
2	India	6	4	2	0	0	16	3.870
3	Australia	6	2	4	0	0	8	3.808
4	Zimbabwe	6	1	5	0	0	4	3.492

Source: ESPNcricinfo

Group stage
No.	Date	Team 1	Captain 1	Team 2	Captain 2	Venue	Result
ODI 197	9 June	England	Bob Willis	New Zealand	Geoff Howarth	Kennington Oval, London	England by 106 runs
ODI 198	9 June	Pakistan	Imran Khan	Sri Lanka	Duleep Mendis	St. Helen's Cricket Ground, Swansea	Pakistan by 50 runs
ODI 199	9 June	Zimbabwe	Duncan Fletcher	Australia	Kim Hughes	Trent Bridge, Nottingham	Zimbabwe by 13 runs
ODI 200	9–10 June	India	Kapil Dev	West Indies	Clive Lloyd	Old Trafford, Manchester	India by 34 runs
ODI 201	11 June	England	Bob Willis	Sri Lanka	Duleep Mendis	County Ground, Taunton	England by 47 runs
ODI 202	11–12 June	England	Geoff Howarth	Pakistan	Imran Khan	Edgbaston, Birmingham	New Zealand by 52 runs
ODI 203	11–12 June	West Indies	Clive Lloyd	Australia	Duncan Fletcher	Headingley, Leeds	West Indies by 101 runs
ODI 204	11 June	Zimbabwe	Duncan Fletcher	India	Kapil Dev	Grace Road, Leicester	India by 5 wickets
ODI 205	13 June	England	Bob Willis	Pakistan	Imran Khan	Lord's, London	England by 8 wickets
ODI 206	13 June	Sri Lanka	Duleep Mendis	New Zealand	Geoff Howarth	County Ground, Bristol	New Zealand by 5 wickets
ODI 207	13 June	Australia	Kim Hughes	India	Kapil Dev	Trent Bridge, Nottingham	Australia by 162 runs
ODI 208	13 June	Zimbabwe	Duncan Fletcher	West Indies	Clive Lloyd	New Road, Worcester	West Indies by 8 wickets
ODI 209	15 June	England	Bob Willis	New Zealand	Geoff Howarth	Edgbaston, Birmingham	New Zealand by 2 wickets
ODI 210	15 June	West Indies	Clive Lloyd	India	Kapil Dev	Kennington Oval, London	West Indies by 66 runs
ODI 211	16 June	Pakistan	Imran Khan	Sri Lanka	Duleep Mendis	Headingley, Leeds	Pakistan by 11 runs
ODI 212	16 June	Australia	Kim Hughes	Zimbabwe	Duncan Fletcher	County Ground, Southampton	Australia by 32 runs
ODI 213	18 June	England	Bob Willis	Pakistan	Imran Khan	Old Trafford, Manchester	England by 7 wickets
ODI 214	18 June	New Zealand	Geoff Howarth	Sri Lanka	Duleep Mendis	County Ground, Derby	Sri Lanka by 3 wickets
ODI 215	18 June	Australia	Kim Hughes	West Indies	Clive Lloyd	Lord's, London	West Indies by 7 wickets
ODI 216	18 June	India	Kapil Dev	Zimbabwe	Duncan Fletcher	Nevill Ground, Royal Tunbridge Wells	India by 31 runs
ODI 217	20 June	England	Bob Willis	Sri Lanka	Duleep Mendis	Headingley, Leeds	England by 9 wickets
ODI 218	20 June	Pakistan	Imran Khan	New Zealand	Geoff Howarth	Trent Bridge, Nottingham	Pakistan by 11 runs
ODI 219	20 June	India	Kapil Dev	Australia	David Hookes	County Ground, Chelmsford	India by 118 runs
ODI 220	20 June	Zimbabwe	Duncan Fletcher	West Indies	Clive Lloyd	Edgbaston, Birmingham	West Indies by 10 wickets
Semi finals
No.	Date	Team 1	Captain 1	Team 2	Captain 2	Venue	Result
ODI 221	22 June	England	Bob Willis	India	Kapil Dev	Old Trafford, Manchester	India by 6 wickets
ODI 222	22 June	Pakistan	Imran Khan	West Indies	Clive Lloyd	Kennington Oval, London	West Indies by 8 wickets
Final
No.	Date	Team 1	Captain 1	Team 2	Captain 2	Venue	Result
ODI 223	25 June	India	Kapil Dev	West Indies	Clive Lloyd	Lord's, London	India by 43 runs

== July ==
=== New Zealand in England ===
Test series
No.	Date	Home captain	Away captain	Venue	Result
Test 957	14–18 July	Bob Willis	Geoff Howarth	The Oval, London	England by 189 runs
Test 958	28 July–1 August	Bob Willis	Geoff Howarth	Headingley, Leeds	New Zealand by 5 wickets
Test 959	11–15 August	Bob Willis	Geoff Howarth	Lord's, London	England by 127 runs
Test 960	25–29 August	Bob Willis	Geoff Howarth	Trent Bridge, Nottingham	England by 165 runs
