= Audrey Palmer =

Zimbabwean field hockey player and administrator

Personal information
- Born: 21 February 1932 Mutare, Zimbabwe
- Died: February 2007 (aged 74) Mvurwi, Zimbabwe

Sport
- Sport: Field hockey
Senior career
Years	Team	Caps	Goals
–	Harare Sports Club	-	-
–	Mashonaland	-	-
National team
Years	Team	Caps	Goals
1953-1961	Rhodesia		-

Audrey Palmer (21 February 1932 – February 2007) was a Zimbabwean field hockey player, administrator and former international umpire. She served as the President of the Zimbabwe Women's Hockey Association from 1980 to 1995. She was regarded as one of the most devoted personalities to have served for the progress of the Zimbabwe women's national field hockey team at international arena.

== Career ==
Audrey represented Rhodesia women's field hockey team at international level from 1953 to 1961. She also played at club level representing Harare Sports Club and Mashonaland. She also represented South African universities at field hockey competitions while pursuing her higher studies at the Maritzburg University.

After retiring from professional field hockey, she became an administrator and referee. She had also served ad one of the standing umpires being part of first South African Grade A umpires contingent when the Women's Hockey Association of Rhodesia was affiliated with the Women's Hockey Association of South Africa.

She was subsequently appointed as chaperone (caretaker) to amateur Zimbabwe women's national field hockey team at the 1980 Summer Olympics which was held in Moscow. She travelled with the team as a medic, trainer and general supervisor. During the 1980 Summer Olympics, Zimbabwe took the stage on storm creating an upset by claiming a historic gold medal defeating Austria 4–1 in the women's hockey competition where Zimbabwe also ended up as unbeaten winners of the competition despite being relatively inexperienced side at international stage.

Following Zimbabwe's fairytale triumph in the inaugural edition of the women's hockey tournament at the 1980 Summer Olympics, on her return to Zimbabwe Audrey was unanimously appointed as the President of the Zimbabwe Women's Hockey Association. She served in the relevant position for 15 years until 1995. During her tenure as the President of the Zimbabwe Women's Hockey Association, she collaborated with former Zimbabwean national field hockey player turned coach Anthea Stewart and kick started a women's hockey development program in Zimbabwe to groom youngsters to be part of Zimbabwe setup.

She received the prestigious President's Award in 1997 from the International Hockey Federation recognising her efforts and contributions in uplifting the standards of women's hockey in Zimbabwe. She was also an Honorary Life Member of the Hockey Association of Zimbabwe.
