= Matthew Williams (cricketer) =

Zimbabwean cricketer (born 1990)

Personal information
- Full name: Matthew Williams
- Born: June 28, 1990 (age 36); Bulawayo, Zimbabwe
- Relatives: Collin Williams (father); Patricia McKillop (mother); Michael McKillop (step brother); Sean Williams (brother)

Domestic team information
- Years: Team
- Matabeleland Tuskers
- Westerns cricket team

Career statistics
Competition	FC	List A
Matches	4	3
Runs scored	130	8
Batting average	21.66	4.00
100s/50s	0/0	0/0
Top score	49*	4
Balls bowled	120	24
Wickets	1	1
Bowling average	46.00	44.00
5 wickets in innings	0	0
10 wickets in match	0	0
Best bowling	1/14	1/26
Catches/stumpings	2/–	1/–
- Source: Cricinfo, 23 January 2018

Matthew Collin Lee Williams (born 28 June 1990) is a Zimbabwean former cricketer. He played four first-class cricket matches and three List A cricket matches in his career for Matabeleland Tuskers and Westerns.

== Personal life ==
His father, Collin Williams was a Zimbabwean first-class cricketer and a former field hockey coach and his mother, Patricia McKillop is a Zimbabwean woman field hockey player who was also a key member of the Zimbabwean field hockey team which claimed gold medal at the 1980 Summer Olympics. Matthew's step brother, Michael McKillop is a Zimbabwean field hockey player and served as the captain of the national field hockey team who also played first-class cricket for Matabeleland. His elder brother, Sean Williams, has played international cricket for Zimbabwe since 2005 and has captained the team since 2019.
