= David Gillow =

Zimbabwean cyclist (born 1958)

Personal information
- Born: 16 April 1958 (age 68) Folkestone, Kent, England

Cycling career
- Sport: Cycling

David Gillow (born 16 April 1958) is a Zimbabwean former cyclist. He was born in Folkestone, Kent, and moved to Rhodesia at the age of 13 where he fought in the Rhodesian Civil War as a helicopter gunner.

Gillow was a competitive cyclist in Zimbabwe, and in 1980 was one was of the first Zimbabwean cyclists to appear at the Olympic Games, together with Michael McBeath and John Musa. He competed in the individual road race event at the 1980 Summer Olympics, being granted two weeks of leave from his army job. His daughter Shara Gillow competed at the 2012 Summer Olympics for Australia.
