= Collin Williams =

Zimbabwean cricketer (1961–2022)

Personal information
- Full name: Collin Ray Williams
- Born: 1 November 1961; Bulawayo, Southern Rhodesia
- Died: 24 April 2022 (aged 60); Bulawayo, Zimbabwe
- Relatives: Patricia McKillop (wife); Michael McKillop (step son); Sean Williams (son); Matthew Williams (son)

Domestic team information
- Years: Team
- Matabeleland cricket team

Career statistics
Competition	FC	LA
Matches	5	1
Runs scored	81	2
Batting average	10.12	2.00
100s/50s	0/0	0/0
Top score	27	2
Catches/stumpings	1/–	3/–
- Source: Cricinfo, 27 April 2022

Collin Ray Williams (1 November 1961 – 24 April 2022) was a Zimbabwean cricketer. He played for Matabeleland in five first-class matches and one List A match. He was also the coach of Zimbabwe field hockey team.

== Personal life ==
Collin Williams was married to a former Zimbabwean woman field hockey player, Patricia McKillop who was also a member of the Zimbabwean field hockey team which claimed a gold medal at the 1980 Summer Olympics. Collin's step son, Michael McKillop is a Zimbabwean field hockey player and served as the captain of the national field hockey team who also played first-class cricket for Matabeleland. His second son, Sean Williams is a cricketer who later went onto play international cricket for Zimbabwe since 2005 and his third son Matthew Williams is also a cricketer who is playing first-class cricket matches for Matabeleland Tuskers.
