= Michael McKillop (cricketer) =

Zimbabwean cricketer (born 1981)

Personal information
- Full name: Michael Grant McKillop
- Born: April 24, 1981 (age 45); Bulawayo, Zimbabwe
- Relatives: Collin Williams (step father); Patricia McKillop (mother); Matthew Williams (half brother); Sean Williams (half brother)

Domestic team information
- Years: Team
- Matabeleland cricket team

Career statistics
Competition	FC	LA
Matches	9	1
Runs scored	439	22
Batting average	31.35	22.00
100s/50s	0/4	0/0
Top score	90*	22
Balls bowled	546	–
Wickets	6	–
Bowling average	48.16	–
5 wickets in innings	0	–
10 wickets in match	0	–
Best bowling	2/65	–
Catches/stumpings	8/–	0/–
- Source: Cricinfo, 23 January 2018

Michael Grant McKillop (born 24 April 1981) is a Zimbabwean first-class cricketer and field hockey player who also served as the captain of the Zimbabwe men's national field hockey team. He has played for Matabeleland team in nine first-class cricket matches.

== Personal life ==
His step-father, Collin Williams was a Zimbabwean first-class cricketer and a former field hockey coach and his mother, Patricia McKillop is a Zimbabwean woman field hockey player who was also a key member of the Zimbabwean field hockey team which claimed gold medal at the 1980 Summer Olympics. His half brother, Sean Williams is also a cricketer who later went onto play international cricket for Zimbabwe since 2005 while Matthew Williams his fellow half brother is also a first-class cricketer playing for Matabeleland Tuskers.
