= Ivan Carter =

Zimbabwean conservationist, tour guide and photographer

- Occupation: Host
- Known for: Conservation and Hunting Skills
- Notable work: Host of Carter's W.A.R
- Television: Outdoor Channel
- Spouse: Ashleigh Carter
- Children: Trail and Brooke Carter, Makenna Wainwright
- Parent(s): Bryan and Claire Carter
- Awards: Outdoor Channel's Golden Moose Awards
- Website: http://ivancarter.com/

Ivan Carter is a Zimbabwean conservationist, professional guide, and photographer. He is also the host of Carter's W.A.R. (Wildlife Animal Response) presented by Nosler on Outdoor Channel.

== Life ==
Carter was born in Rhodesia (now Zimbabwe) to Bryan Carter, a farmer and veterinarian for a pharmaceutical company, and Claire Carter. Carter holds guiding licenses in several African countries, including Zimbabwe, Tanzania, Botswana, and Mozambique, and spends an average of 200 days a year in the field. In addition to English, he speaks two different African languages: Shona and Swahili.

== Professional career ==
Carter's W.A.R. (Wildlife Animal Response) debuted on Outdoor Channel in December 2015. The original TV series follows Carter as he exposes the truth about how heavily armed poachers are butchering elephants for their tusks and rhinoceros for their horns in Africa as part of his greater effort to preserve wildlife. “There is more wildlife-human conflict than there has ever been and our wildlife resources are getting squeezed,” said Carter on an NRA News interview. His aim is to advance the ideology of conservation as a life-saving process and solution for the conflict.

Carter is keen on spotlighting the conservation efforts that hunters bring. He believes it is poachers – not hunters – that condemn animals to extinction by disrespecting their place in the ecosystem. “The statistics will show that in areas with well-managed sustainable hunting, the wildlife proliferates. The wildlife populations go through the roof,” he once told The Huffington Post. In fact, he issued a challenge to non-hunters in August 2015: join him on a safari for Cape buffalo and take pictures. In return, the non-hunter would pay the same amount a hunter would expect to pay for a similar hunt, which would be between $20,000 and $25,000, which includes anti-poaching and community fees.

In November 2015, he became a Nosler Pro-Staff member.

Carter was the co-host of As Close as You Dare, a wildlife documentary focused on close up big game encounters across Zimbabwe, Botswana, Uganda, and Tanzania, which was featured on PBS in 2008 and 2009.

In 2008, he was chosen by the United States Marine Corps as a hunting and tracking subject matter expert, and he helped in the development of the “Combat Hunter” program for soldiers to use while in combat.

Carter also previously hosted Dallas Safari Club's Tracks Across Africa and Hornady's Africa, among other TV series.

In January 2003, he was listed among the best 15 Safari Guides by The Daily Telegraph newspaper.

Carter was rated by Condé Nast Traveler as of Africa's top 10 guides in October 2002.

He was recognized in the August 2001 issue of Travel + Leisure magazine in their article “Follow the Leaders” featuring the best guides in Africa.

In 2001 and again in 2003, Carter was invited by Stanford University to present lectures on “Observations of Wildlife” and “Monitoring Elephant Populations.”

He owned and operated a photographic safari business for 12 years (1992-2004) that employed almost 80 employees and serviced 500 clients annually.
