= William Hamilton (British Army officer) =

William Robert Hamilton (1891–12 October 1917) was a Scottish poet and First World War soldier. He was born in Dumfries, Scotland in 1891. He emigrated to South Africa where a portion of his education was at the South African College, Cape Town. He was killed on the Western Front in Flanders, Belgium in 1917 and is remembered on the Tyne Cot Memorial, at the Tyne Cot British Cemetery and Memorial, at Ypres in Flanders, Belgium.

The reference to him reads:

In Memory of Second Lieutenant William Robert Hamilton Coldstream Guards attd. 4th Coy., Machine Gun Guards who died on 12 October 1917. Son of John Hamilton, of 105, Kloof St., Cape Town, South Africa. Remembered with honour.

— Commonwealth War Graves Commission

== Publications ==
- William Hamilton. Modern Poems. Oxford: B. H. Blackwell, 1917. 011648.eee.17 British Library
- William Hamilton. Moths and Fairies: A Play. 1912.

== Sources ==
- Source Original text: William Hamilton, Modern Poems (Oxford: B. H. Blackwell, 1917): 50–51. 011648.eee.17 British Library First publication date: 1917
