= Lynne Tasker =

Zimbabwean swimmer (born 1963)

Personal information
- Born: 27 August 1963 (age 62)

Sport
- Sport: Swimming

Lynne Tasker (born 27 August 1963) is a Zimbabwean breaststroke and freestyle swimmer. She competed in three events at the 1980 Summer Olympics.
