= Zimbabwe women's national field hockey team at the 1980 Summer Olympics =

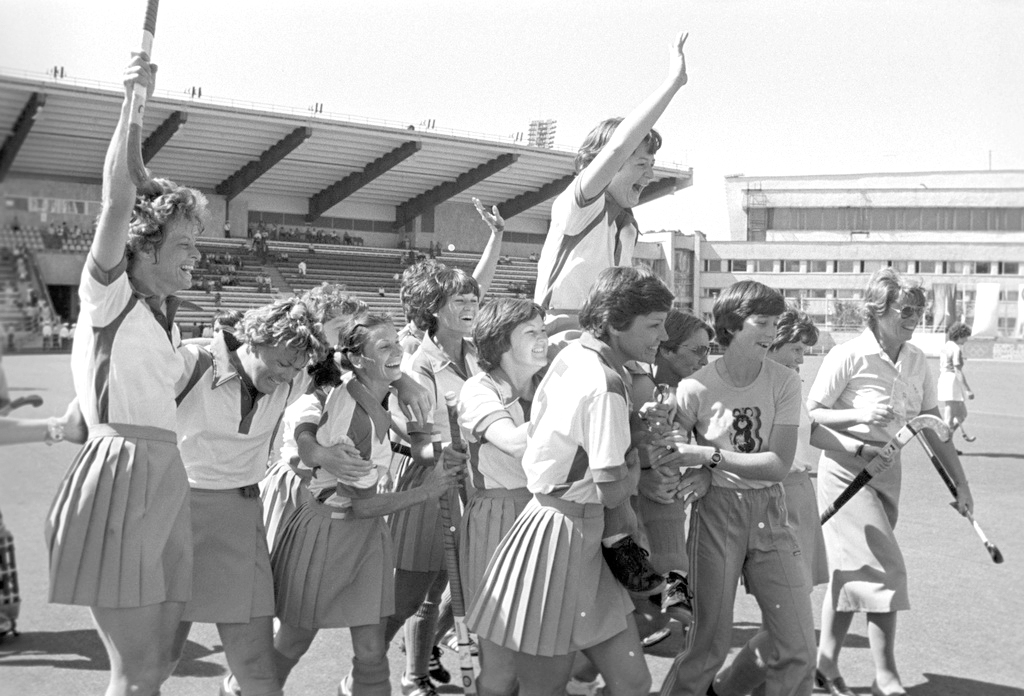
The Zimbabweans celebrate after their 4–0 win over Poland at Dynamo Minor Arena, Moscow.

The 1980 Zimbabwe women's national field hockey team won the gold medal in women's field hockey at that year's Summer Olympics in Moscow, the capital of the Soviet Union. The squad of 16 women, was assembled less than a month before the Olympics began to help fill the gaps the American-led Olympic boycott created in the women's hockey competition. Zimbabwe's subsequent victory in the round-robin tournament with three wins and two draws was regarded as a huge upset, particularly considering the team's lack of preparation and experience; it has been called an "irresistible fairy story". Won at a time of great political transition in Zimbabwe, the gold medal was the country's first Olympic medal of any colour.

The 1980 Olympics were first to feature women's hockey, and the first to include Zimbabwe under that name—barred from the last three Olympics for political reasons, the country had last competed as Rhodesia in 1964. The women's hockey matches, held between 25 and 31 July, were all played on artificial turf, which none of the Zimbabwean team members had ever seen; they had also never played together until that month. After beating Poland and the USSR and drawing with Czechoslovakia and India, the Zimbabweans won the competition on the final day with a 4–1 victory over Austria. Dubbed the "Golden Girls" by the media of Zimbabwe, they were met by cheering crowds on their return home, and were briefly national celebrities. Zimbabwe did not win another Olympic medal until 2004.

== Invitation and team selection ==
The 1980 Summer Olympics in Moscow, the capital of the Soviet Union, were the first to include a competition in women's field hockey. (Note: Men's field hockey first appeared at the Olympics in 1908 and has been played continuously since 1928.) Pre-tournament favourites included Australia, the Netherlands and West Germany, but the American-led Western boycott of the Moscow Olympics led to these teams and others withdrawing, leaving only the Soviets in the women's hockey event. The Soviet and international Olympic authorities filled the gaps by inviting teams from countries that had not qualified. Among the nations invited was Zimbabwe, which had become an internationally recognised country in April 1980 following seven years of civil war. Moscow marked the southern African nation's return to the Olympics after 16 years; as Rhodesia it had been excluded from the 1968, 1972 and 1976 Games for political reasons following the mostly white government's declaration of independence from Britain in 1965. The Zimbabwe Olympic Committee received the invitation to send men's and women's hockey squads to Moscow on 14 June 1980, 35 days before the Olympics were due to start. They were taken totally by surprise—they had not prepared hockey teams for the Games—but nevertheless agreed to send a women's squad. No women's hockey team representing the country had ever played overseas before.

A squad of 16 members, built around the core of the former Rhodesia team, was hastily assembled by Liz Dreyer, the president of the national women's hockey association, who became the team's manager. Every player and official was white. Ann Grant, the team's 25-year-old sweeper, was appointed captain. Anthea Stewart, who had played for South Africa 25 times before retiring in 1974, both coached the squad and played herself. Liz Chase, the only other team member with international experience (having also represented South Africa) was made vice-captain. At 35 years old, Stewart was the team's oldest player, while Arlene Boxall, the 18-year-old reserve goalkeeper, was the youngest. The squad included twin sisters in Sandy Chick and Sonia Robertson.

Entirely amateur, the team mostly comprised players with professions unrelated to sport—Grant, for example, was a bookkeeper, while Boxall was an operations clerk in the Air Force of Zimbabwe. Several had sporting relatives, most prominently Grant, whose brother was the international cricketer Duncan Fletcher. Audrey Palmer, a seasoned hockey official and referee who had played for Rhodesia from 1953 to 1961, travelled with the team as a medic, trainer and general supervisor. The squad left on 7 July, travelling first to the Zambian capital Lusaka and then to Luanda in Angola, from where they flew to Moscow on an aircraft usually used for freighting meat. "The stench was terrible", Grant later said. "There were no seats, so we all sat on the floor, strapped in and set off into the unknown. We didn't even have the right shoes to play on the artificial hockey surface."

1980 Zimbabwe women's national field hockey team
Name (role)	Position	Date of birth (age)	Profession	Club
Arlene Boxall	Goalkeeper	9 October 1961 (age 18)	Operations clerk in Air Force of Zimbabwe	Police
Liz Chase (vice-captain)	Forward	26 April 1950 (age 30)	Physical education teacher	Old Hararians
Sandra Chick	Forward	2 June 1947 (age 33)	Bank official	Salisbury Sports
Gillian Cowley	Various	8 July 1955 (age 25)	Bookkeeper	Salisbury Sports
Patricia Davies	Various	5 December 1956 (age 23)	Secretary	Old Hararians
Sarah English	Goalkeeper	28 November 1955 (age 24)	Audit clerk	Queens Sports Club
Maureen George	Defender	1 September 1955 (age 24)	Secretary	Salisbury Sports
Ann Grant (captain)	Sweeper	6 May 1955 (age 25)	Bookkeeper	Old Hararians
Susan Huggett	Various	29 June 1954 (age 26)	Bookkeeper	Old Hararians
Patricia McKillop	Midfielder	15 July 1956 (age 24)	Housewife	Bulawayo Athletic Club
Brenda Phillips	Midfielder	18 January 1958 (age 22)	Physical education teacher	Old Miltonians
Christine Prinsloo	Midfielder	3 May 1952 (age 28)	Insurance underwriter	Salisbury Postals
Sonia Robertson	Defender	2 June 1947 (age 33)	Sports coach	Salisbury Sports
Anthea Stewart (player-coach)	Various	20 November 1944 (age 35)	Not recorded	—
Helen Volk	Various	29 March 1954 (age 26)	Not recorded	Bulawayo Athletic Club
Linda Watson	Various	11 September 1955 (age 24)	Secretary-bookkeeper	Salisbury Sports

== Tournament ==
The event was organised as a round-robin tournament in which each of the six teams would play each other once between 25 and 31 July. Two points were awarded for a win and one for a draw; the team with the most points at the end would be the winner. The other competitors were Austria, Czechoslovakia, India, Poland and the USSR; apart from the Soviets, all of these teams were competing as a result of the boycott, having failed to qualify initially. All of the matches were played at Dynamo Minor Arena in Moscow. Zimbabwe arrived two weeks before the hockey tournament was due to start, and warmed up with a number of matches against local teams. The players' lack of preparation and unfamiliarity with artificial turf—"none of us had ever seen it before", Chick recalled—were offset by what several members of the squad have described as a very strong team spirit. They considered themselves serious underdogs and did not expect to win a medal.

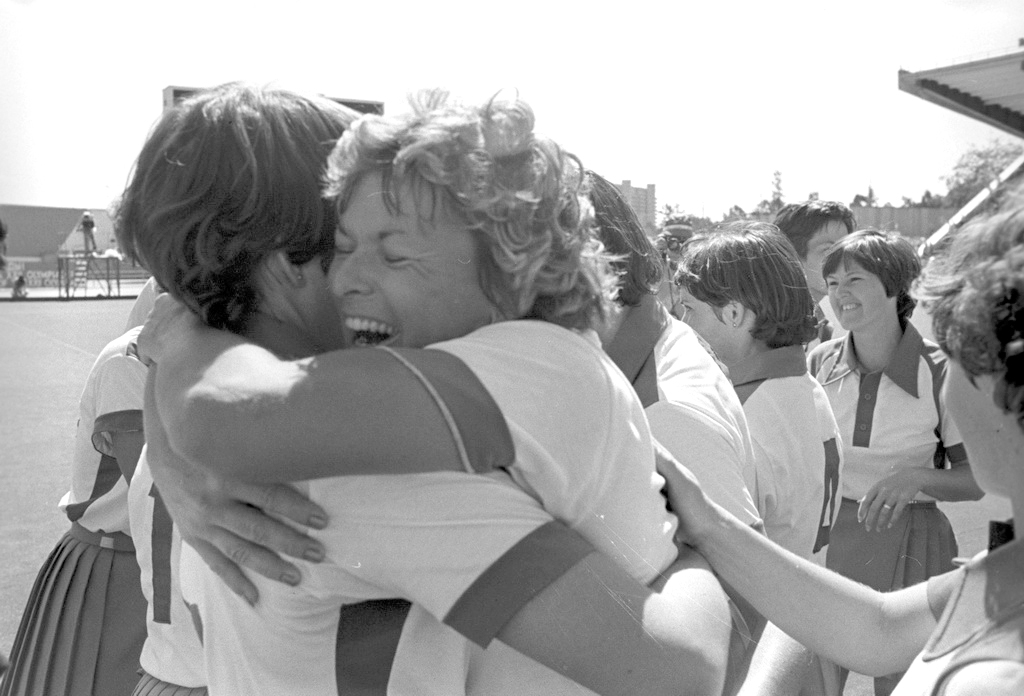
Members of the Zimbabwean team celebrate after their victory over Poland.

Zimbabwe played in the first women's Olympic hockey match, facing Poland on 25 July. Pat McKillop scored the first goal to put Zimbabwe ahead before Pat Davies, Linda Watson and Chase each added one more to round off a 4–0 victory. On 27 July, Zimbabwe and Czechoslovakia drew 2–2; McKillop and Chase scored. The next day, the Zimbabweans beat the Soviets 2–0, McKillop scoring both goals. A 1–1 draw with India on 30 July put Zimbabwe in first place before the final round of matches on the 31st. Zimbabwe had to beat Austria to be sure of winning the gold.

Stewart declared the team's first-choice white-and-blue outfit "lucky" on the basis that both Zimbabwe's victories had been won wearing it (as opposed to the two draws wearing green), and expressed joy that they would again be wearing white and blue in the deciding match. According to Glen Byrom, covering the event for the Herald newspaper, the Zimbabweans appeared nervous during the opening stages of the game, and were fortunate not to go behind after 15 minutes, when Austria missed a clear chance. Chick opened the scoring after 28 minutes, receiving the ball from a corner before cleanly stroking it into the net. Austria's Brigitte Kindler equalised two minutes later from a penalty stroke, flicking the ball beyond Zimbabwean goalkeeper Sarah English into the top-left corner of the goal. With the score 1–1 at half time, Brenda Phillips replaced Christine Prinsloo at right-half.

Urged on by a small but loud group of fellow Zimbabwean Olympians, the Zimbabweans improved after the break and, according to Byrom, "ke[pt] the Austrian goal under siege" throughout the second half. With 50 of the match's 70 minutes gone, McKillop powerfully stroked a short corner that deflected off an opposing player's stick and flew high into the net to give Zimbabwe the lead. Now appearing supremely confident, Byrom reported, the Zimbabweans "simply overran Austria with a splendid display of fast, attacking hockey", forcing eight short corners and four long corners during the second period to Austria's one long corner. Gillian Cowley made it 3–1 on 60 minutes, following up to score after Sandy Chick's free hit was blocked. McKillop rounded up the win four minutes later, collecting a through pass from Chase and smashing the ball home. Byrom reported "incredible scenes of unrestrained joy" at the final buzzer—"the Zimbabweans, tears streaming from their eyes, danced about the field hugging and kissing each other". Finally they hoisted Grant onto their shoulders and carried her off the field.

A few hours later, the Zimbabwean players returned to the field wearing their blue skirts and blue Zimbabwe Olympic blazers for the medals ceremony. After the third-placed Soviets and second-placed Czechoslovaks had received their medals, Grant led the team up to the podium to receive the first ever Olympic gold medal for women's hockey. It was their country's first Olympic medal of any colour. All 16 players received medals; they then led the Czechoslovak and Soviet teams on a walking lap of honour around the field.

Zimbabwe finished the tournament undefeated, having scored the most goals and conceded the fewest of any team. The six goals from Pat McKillop, a housewife from Bulawayo, made her the competition's joint top scorer with the USSR's Natella Krasnikova. Chase, despite nursing a knee injury, played in all five matches and scored three goals. All of the Zimbabwean squad members played at least one match except for Boxall, who never came off the bench, but still received a gold medal.

Final standings
Pos	Team	Pld	W	D	L	GF	GA	Pts
1st place, gold medalist(s)	Zimbabwe	5	3	2	0	13	4	8
2nd place, silver medalist(s)	Czechoslovakia	5	3	1	1	10	5	7
3rd place, bronze medalist(s)	Soviet Union	5	3	0	2	11	5	6
4	India	5	2	1	2	9	6	5
5	Austria	5	2	0	3	6	11	4
6	Poland	5	0	0	5	0	18	0

== Reactions and legacy ==
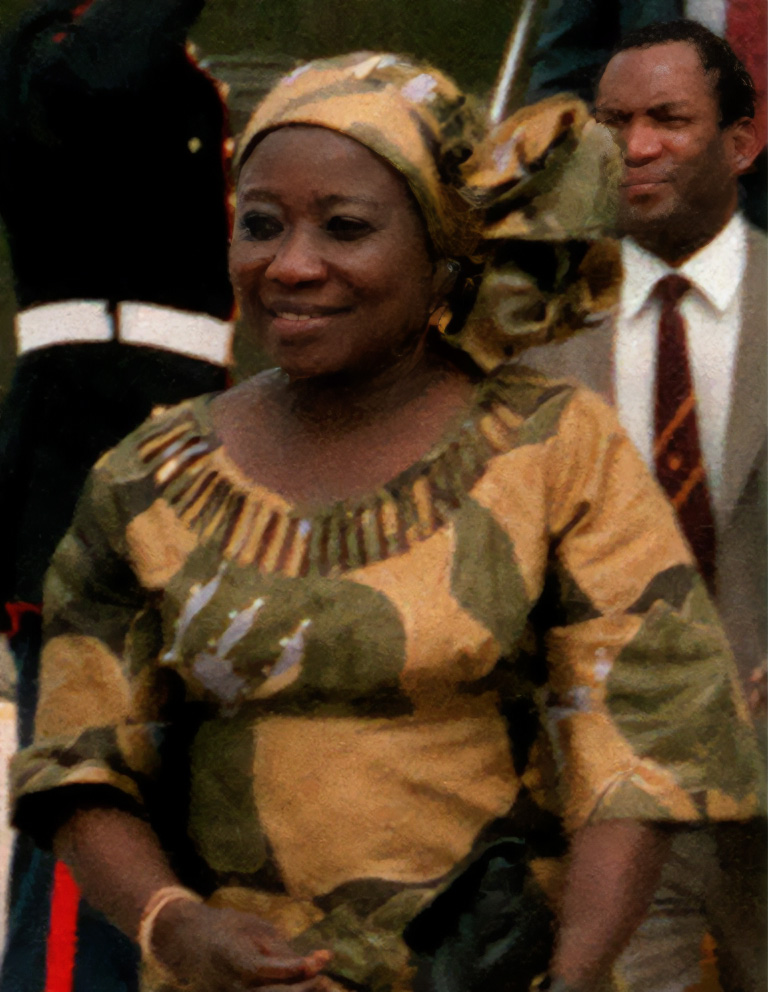
Sally Mugabe promised each of the players an ox, but ultimately gave them packages of meat instead.

The victorious hockey players were immediately dubbed the "Golden Girls" by Zimbabwean reporters. They were greeted by huge crowds on their return to Zimbabwe and briefly became national celebrities. Prime Minister Robert Mugabe welcomed them home at an official function. Each member of the team was promised an ox by the Prime Minister's wife Sally, but ultimately received a polystyrene package of meat instead at a ceremony hosted by Mrs Mugabe. Many of the players emigrated over the following years, mostly to South Africa. Their victory continues to be celebrated in Zimbabwe today. The country did not win another Olympic medal until Kirsty Coventry won three swimming medals in Athens in 2004. Robert Mugabe promptly applied the "golden girl" nickname to her on her return home.

The Zimbabwean hockey team's victory at the 1980 Olympics was widely considered a great upset. Sports historians have called it a "fairytale" and an "irresistible fairy story". While the Zimbabweans were overjoyed by their unlikely status as the first ever Olympic gold medallists in women's hockey, some, including Robert Sullivan of Sports Illustrated, felt that the Zimbabwean victory epitomised how the Western boycott had lowered competitive standards and, in their opinion, "ruined" the 1980 Olympics. While acknowledging this to an extent, Cathy Harris asserted in her 2008 retrospective on the team, published in The Sunday Times, that the victory still deserved to be recognised as a great achievement. "They freely acknowledge that they won the gold medal without competing against the best in the world", she concludes, "but, like many athletes in Moscow in 1980, they seized their chance."

== Notes and references ==
=== Journal and newspaper articles ===
- Chirumanzu, Grace (21 July 2012). "Trish Davies' Glittering History". The Herald. Harare.
- Harris, Cathy (11 May 2008). "Caught in Time: Zimbabwe win hockey gold, 1980 Moscow Olympics". The Sunday Times. London. Archived from the original on 27 February 2014.
- Harris, Cathy (15 May 2008). "Zimbabwe's fairytale Gold Medal in Moscow". Lausanne: International Hockey Federation.
- Little, Charles (2005). "Preventing 'A Wonderful Breakthrough For Rhodesia': The British Government and the Exclusion of Rhodesia from the 1968 Mexico Olympics" (PDF). Olympika: The International Journal of Olympic Studies. XIV: 47–68. Archived from the original (PDF) on 11 September 2016.
- Sandu, Ndamu; Muchinjo, Enock (30 July 2004). "Coventry sparkles in forgettable year". The Standard. Harare.
- Sullivan, Robert (21 May 1984). "A Decline in the Gold Standard". Sports Illustrated. New York.
- "She powered Zim to Olympics glory". Daily News. Harare. 10 December 2012. Archived from the original on 5 March 2014.

=== Bibliography ===
- Byrom, Glen; McDermott, Dave; Streak, Brian (1980). Rhodesian Sports Profiles, 1907–1979: with a supplementary feature on the Zimbabwe women's hockey team to the Moscow Olympics, 1980. Bulawayo: Books of Zimbabwe. ISBN 978-0-86920-217-3.
- Caute, David (1983). Under the Skin: The Death of White Rhodesia (First ed.). Evanston, Illinois: Northwestern University Press. ISBN 978-0-8101-0658-1.
- Mallon, Bill; Heijmans, Jeroen (2011). Historical Dictionary of the Olympic Movement (Fourth ed.). Lanham, Maryland: Scarecrow Press. ISBN 978-0-8108-7522-7.
- Mathers, Kathryn (2012). "Coventry, Kirsty". In Akyeampong, Emmanuel K.; Gates, Henry Louis Jr (eds.). Dictionary of African Biography. Oxford University Press. pp. 130–131. ISBN 978-0-19-538207-5.
- Tomlinson, Alan (2010). Oxford Dictionary of Sports Studies (Fourth ed.). Oxford University Press. ISBN 978-0-19-921381-8.
- Moscow Olympics 1980 – Zimbabwe Women's Hockey Gold Medallists (commemorative booklet). Salisbury: Zimbabwe Olympic Committee. 1980.
