= Abel Nkhoma =

Zimbabwean long-distance runner

Personal information
- Nationality: Zimbabwean
- Born: 1961 (age 64–65) Kadoma, Zimbabwe

Sport
- Sport: Long-distance running
- Event: Marathon

Abel Nkhoma (born 1961) is a Zimbabwean long-distance runner. He competed in the marathon at the 1980 Summer Olympics. Nkhoma was the flag bearer for Zimbabwe in the opening ceremony.
