= David Parrington =

Zimbabwean diver (born 1955)

Personal information
- Nationality: Zimbabwean
- Born: 28 July 1955 (age 70) Wallasey, England

Sport
- Sport: Diving

David Parrington (born 28 July 1955) is a Zimbabwean diver. He competed in two events at the 1980 Summer Olympics.
