= Kenias Tembo =

Zimbabwean long-distance runner

Personal information
- Nationality: Zimbabwean
- Born: 15 March 1955 (age 71)

Sport
- Sport: Long-distance running
- Event: 10,000 metres

Kenias Tembo (born 15 March 1955) is a Zimbabwean long-distance runner. He competed in the men's 10,000 metres at the 1980 Summer Olympics.
