= Duncan Fletcher =

Zimbabwean cricket coach

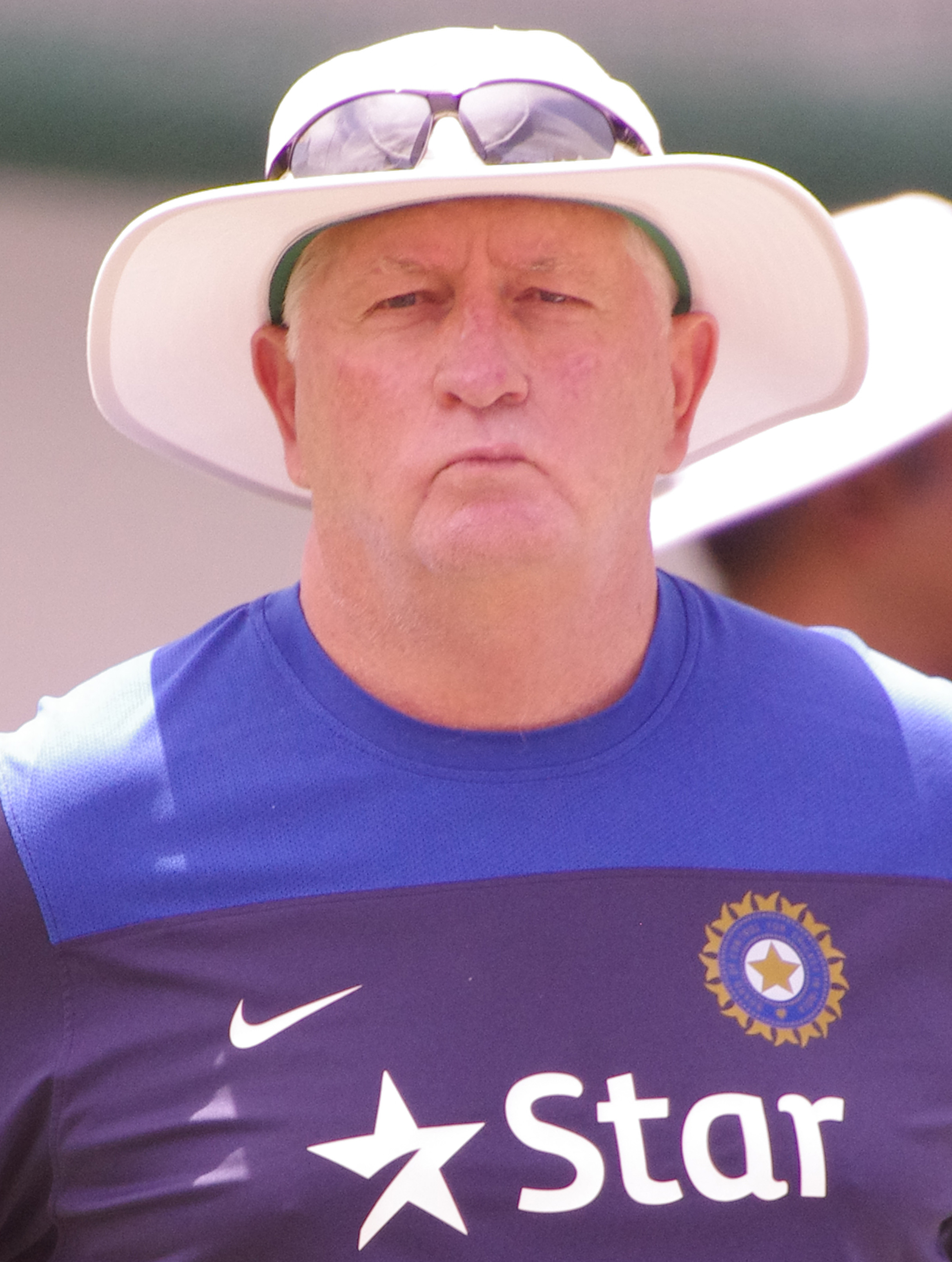
- Fletcher with India in 2015

Personal information
- Born: 27 September 1948 (age 78); Salisbury, Southern Rhodesia
- Batting: Left-handed
- Bowling: Right-arm fast-medium
- Relatives: Allan Fletcher (brother); Ann Grant (sister)

International information
- National side: Zimbabwe
- ODI debut (cap 3): 9 June 1983 v Australia
- Last ODI: 20 June 1983 v West Indies

Domestic team information
- Years: Team
- 1969/70–1979/80: Rhodesia
- 1984/85: Western Province

Career statistics
Competition	ODI	FC	LA
Matches	6	111	53
Runs scored	191	4,095	1,119
Batting average	47.75	23.67	28.69
100s/50s	0/2	0/20	1/7
Top score	71*	93	108
Balls bowled	301	12,352	2,422
Wickets	7	215	70
Bowling average	31.57	28.03	23.60
5 wickets in innings	0	5	0
10 wickets in match	0	1	0
Best bowling	4/42	6/31	4/41
Catches/stumpings	0/–	75/–	20/–
Medal record
Men's Cricket
Representing India as Coach
ICC Champions Trophy
Winner	2013 England and Wales
ICC T20 World Cup
Runner-up	2014 Bangladesh
- Source: Cricinfo, 24 December 2008

Duncan Andrew Gwynne Fletcher OBE (born 27 September 1948) is a Zimbabwean cricket coach and former cricketer, who has coached the England and Indian national teams. He led the Indian team to be the winners of the 2013 ICC Champions Trophy, where the team was undefeated during the tournament.

He was England coach between 1999 and 2007, and is credited with the resurgence of the England team in Test cricket in the early 2000s.

== Early life ==
Fletcher was born in Salisbury, Southern Rhodesia (modern day Harare, Zimbabwe) and was one of five brothers in a Rhodesian farming family. The family moved from Kent to Rhodesia in 1933. Fletcher performed his national service as a Rifleman in the Rhodesia Regiment between 1966 and 1967 and joined the regular force in the Rhodesian Light Infantry in 1967 and attained the rank of Staff Sergeant in 1975. He then went on to Officer School at the School of Infantry in 1975 and was commissioned as a lieutenant in the Rhodesia Regiment Territorial Army battalion. He left the Army in 1980 as a captain.

== Cricket career ==
=== Playing career ===
As a player, Fletcher was a member of the Rhodesia cricket team during the 1970s, which at that time participated in the South African domestic competition, the Currie Cup; he also played in South Africa for Western Province. Following Zimbabwe's independence in 1980, Fletcher became captain of the Zimbabwean team, leading the team to victory in the 1982 ICC Trophy. This meant that Zimbabwe qualified for the 1983 Cricket World Cup in England; in their opening match at Trent Bridge, Fletcher was man-of-the-match (scoring 69 not out and taking 4/42) as Zimbabwe beat Australia.

=== Coaching career ===
Fletcher coached Western Province and Glamorgan in first-class cricket, before being appointed as England coach in 1999.

Under Fletcher, England achieved series victories away to Sri Lanka, Pakistan, West Indies and South Africa between 2000 and 2004. In 2004 they won an English record eight consecutive Test matches, beating New Zealand 3–0 and West Indies 4–0 at home, respectively, before winning the first Test in South Africa. In September 2005 he became the first coach of the England team in 18 years to win an Ashes series when England secured 2–1 victory over Australia. As a result, Fletcher was awarded the OBE and in September 2005 was awarded British citizenship after a five-year wait. Although both his parents and all of his grandparents were of English descent, he had been denied citizenship because he had spent most of his time whilst living in England touring abroad with the England team. After the Ashes series win of 2005, the Home Secretary, Charles Clarke, intervened to award Fletcher his citizenship.

Fletcher received criticism after preferring Ashley Giles to Monty Panesar as England's main spinner in the first two Tests of the 2006–07 Ashes series; Giles took three wickets in two Tests, while Panesar, when given the chance in the third Test, took five wickets in the first innings and three in the second innings. Following defeat to Australia by 206 runs in the third Test on 18 December 2006 which saw England relinquish the Ashes 15 months after gaining them, the England and Wales Cricket Board confirmed that Fletcher's position as head coach was under review. Despite a brief reprieve in early 2007 when England won the Commonwealth Bank Series, Fletcher came under increased criticism as England performed poorly in the 2007 Cricket World Cup, culminating in a nine-wicket loss to South Africa in which the team were booed off the field by England's Barmy Army. His eight-year tenure as coach ended following England's final World Cup match against the West Indies on 21 April 2007.

While England were successful in Test cricket under Fletcher, the fortunes of the one-day side plummeted, and the only major success in one-day cricket during Fletcher era came three months before his exit in the 2007 Commonwealth Bank Series against Australia.

In November 2007 Fletcher confirmed that he was considering a switch to rugby, stating "I'd like to be a rugby consultant. I have some ideas...I love my rugby, I would rather watch rugby than cricket. I'm passionate about it, it's the game I'd like to have been involved in." At the same time his autobiography, Behind The Shades, was published.

In November 2008 it was announced that Fletcher would take on a consultancy role with Hampshire County Cricket Club for the 2009 season. Days later he took a similar role with the South Africa team ahead of their Test series' against Bangladesh and Australia.

Fletcher was appointed coach of the India national cricket team on 27 April 2011, with a two-year contract, having been outgoing coach Gary Kirsten's recommendation. Under Fletcher's coaching, the India achieved eight series victories in a row, including winning the 2013 ICC Champions Trophy in 2013. His contract ended after the 2015 Cricket World Cup and was not renewed.

== Family ==
Fletcher's sister, Ann Grant captained the Zimbabwe women's national field hockey team which won the gold medal in the 1980 Summer Olympics in Moscow. His brother, Allan Fletcher, played seven first-class games for Rhodesia in the late 1970s.
