= Guy Goosen =

Zimbabwean swimmer (born 1959)

Personal information
- Born: 12 July 1959 (age 66)

Sport
- Sport: Swimming

Guy Goosen (born 12 July 1959) is a Zimbabwean butterfly and freestyle swimmer. He competed in three events at the 1980 Summer Olympics.
