= Sean Williams (cricketer) =

Zimbabwean cricketer (born 1986)

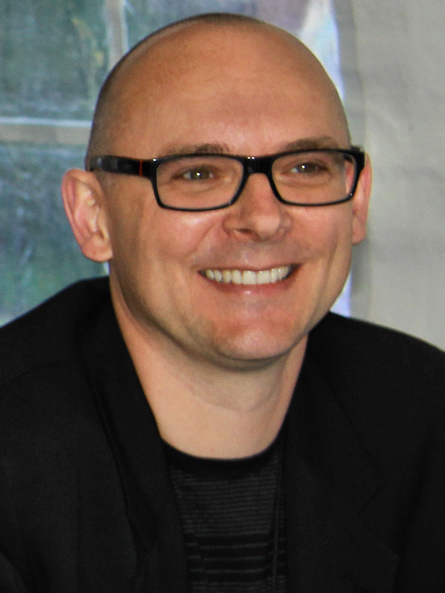

Personal information
- Full name: Sean Colin Williams
- Born: 26 September 1986 (age 40); Bulawayo, Zimbabwe
- Batting: Left-handed
- Bowling: Slow left arm orthodox
- Role: All-Rounder
- Relatives: Collin Williams (father); Patricia McKillop (mother); Michael McKillop (halfbrother); Matthew Williams (brother)

International information
- National side: Zimbabwe (2005–present)
- Test debut (cap 86): 20 March 2013 v West Indies
- Last Test: 7 August 2025 v New Zealand
- ODI debut (cap 86): 25 February 2005 v South Africa
- Last ODI: 21 December 2024 v Afghanistan
- ODI shirt no.: 14
- T20I debut (cap 11): 28 November 2006 v Bangladesh
- Last T20I: 12 May 2024 v Bangladesh
- T20I shirt no.: 14

Domestic team information
- Years: Team
- 2004–present: Matabeleland Tuskers
- 2006–2009: Westerns

Career statistics
Competition	Test	ODI	T20I	FC
Matches	18	162	81	75
Runs scored	1,431	4,986	1,691	5,699
Batting average	44.71	38.06	23.48	45.23
100s/50s	5/4	8/35	0/11	15/28
Top score	154	174	66	178
Balls bowled	2,356	4,792	1,188	6,767
Wickets	25	83	48	98
Bowling average	49.96	47.54	28.62	35.11
5 wickets in innings	0	0	0	3
10 wickets in match	0	0	0	1
Best bowling	3/20	4/43	3/15	6/47
Catches/stumpings	16/–	59/–	29/–	73/–
- Source: ESPNCricInfo, 7 August 2025

Sean Colin Williams (born 26 September 1986) is a Zimbabwean international cricketer who is a former captain of the national team in Test cricket. He plays Tests and One Day Internationals, and formerly T20Is, primarily as a batting all-rounder. In September 2019, Zimbabwe Cricket named him as Zimbabwe's captain, after Hamilton Masakadza retired from international cricket. Later the same month, Williams captained Zimbabwe for the first time, in the opening Twenty20 International (T20I) match of the 2019–20 Singapore Tri-Nation Series, against Nepal. He is the current holder of the longest international career record in men's cricket (20 years and 58 days).

== Under-19s career ==
In the Under-19 World Cup in 2004 he was the pick of Zimbabwe's batsmen with 157 runs at 31.40, as well as five wickets. He led the Under-19 team in the World Cup in Sri Lanka in February 2006, the highlight being a win over England.

== Domestic and T20 career ==
In first-class cricket, Williams plays for Matabeleland Tuskers. He made his highest domestic score for Westerns against Centrals in 2006–07, when he top-scored in both innings with 76 and 129 in a 77-run victory.

In October 2018, he was named in Tshwane Spartans' squad for the first edition of the Mzansi Super League T20 tournament. In December 2020, he was selected to play for the Tuskers in the 2020–21 Logan Cup.

He was also named in Durdanto Dhaka's squad in 2024 Bangladesh Premier League

== International career ==
He was expected to be called up at the time of the players' strike in April 2004. Almost a year later, and with just one first-class match, he was drafted into the Zimbabwe squad to tour South Africa.

He turned down a central contract the following month, opting to look for a more settled career overseas, although he again changed his mind, returning to play for Zimbabwe three months later. Dogged by injuries, the on-off farrago resurfaced in 2008 when he again quit for a contract in South Africa, only to return weeks later.

He scored 178 for a Zimbabwe XI against Ireland in the ICC Intercontinental Cup in 2010–11.

He was ruled out of the Cricket World Cup 2011 due to a fractured thumb.

In 2013, in second Test at Roseau, he made his Test debut against West Indies, scoring 31 and 6.

In September 2013, he made himself unavailable for the first Test against Pakistan because of the payments issue and was satisfied with an offer made to him and was committed to the country in future.

On 19 February 2015, he scored an unbeaten 76 runs in the Cricket World Cup against the United Arab Emirates. When he came to the crease, Zimbabwe was in deep trouble on 177/5. But finally he guided the team to victory with 76 runs off 65 balls with 7 fours and one six.

He scored his first Test century in his third Test. Playing against New Zealand at Bulawayo in July 2016, he batted at number eight in the second innings and scored 119 off 148 balls. His first century was the fastest ever by any Zimbabwean in Test Cricket. In April 2019, in the ODI series against the United Arab Emirates, Williams scored the fastest century for a Zimbabwe batsman in an ODI match, doing so from 75 balls.

In January 2020 Williams played his first Test series as Zimbabwe Captain in a two match home series against Sri Lanka. He made his second Test century in the second Test match, making 107 before being bowled by Dhananjaya De Silva in a drawn match, Zimbabwe's first home draw since 2017. Sri Lanka won the series 1–0.

In June 2023, Williams scored Zimbabwe's fastest ever ODI century, a record which was broken only two days later by Sikandar Raza. In the same World Cup Qualifier tournament, Williams went on to score 174 off 101 balls against USA to help Zimbabwe reach its highest ever ODI total of 408. In that match, USA were all-out for 104, and Zimbabwe won the match by 304 runs, registering the second biggest win in all men's ODIs.

On 12 May 2024, he announced his retirement from Twenty20 Internationals (T20Is).

Williams made his best Test match score to date in the first of a two-match series against Afghanistan in December 2024, compiling 154 from 174 balls including 10 fours and three sixes.

== Personal life ==
He attended Falcon College in Esigodini, Zimbabwe and Petra High School in Bulawayo, Zimbabwe. His father is Collin Williams, a former first-class cricketer and a national field hockey coach, and his brother Matthew Williams has played first-class cricket in Zimbabwe for Matabeleland Tuskers. His mother Patricia McKillop, was a field hockey player, who was a member of the Zimbabwe national team that won the gold medal at the 1980 Summer Olympics His half brother, Michael McKillop is also a first-class cricketer and a field hockey player who played for Matabeleland and also served as the captain of the Zimbabwe men's national field hockey team.

He married Chantelle Dexter in Bulawayo in April 2015.
