= Brenda Phillips =

Zimbabwean field hockey player (born 1958)

Personal information
- Born: 18 January 1958 (age 68)
Medal record
Women's Field Hockey
Representing Zimbabwe
Olympic Games
Gold medal – first place	1980 Moscow	Team competition

Brenda Phillips (born 18 January 1958) is a former field hockey player from Zimbabwe, who was a member of the national team that won the gold medal at the 1980 Summer Olympics in Moscow.

Because of the boycott of the United States and other countries, only one team was available to compete in the women's field hockey tournament: the hosting USSR team. A late request was sent to the government of the African nation, which quickly assembled a team less than a week before the competition started. To everyone's surprise they won, claiming Zimbabwe's only medal in the 1980 Games.
