= Arlene Boxall =

Zimbabwean field hockey player (born 1961)

Personal information
- Born: 9 October 1961 (age 64)
Medal record
Women's Field Hockey
Representing Zimbabwe
Olympic Games
Gold medal – first place	1980 Moscow	Team competition

Arlene Boxall (born 9 October 1961) is a former field hockey player from Zimbabwe, who was a member of the national team that won the gold medal at the 1980 Summer Olympics in Moscow. The youngest member of the team at 18 years old, she was its reserve goalkeeper. She never came onto the field, but still received a gold medal alongside her teammates.

At the time she was an operations clerk in Air Force of Zimbabwe.
