= Helen Volk =

Zimbabwean field hockey player (born 1954)

Personal information
- Born: 29 March 1954 (age 72)
Medal record
Women's Field Hockey
Representing Zimbabwe
Olympic Games
| Gold medal – first place | 1980 Moscow | Team competition |

Helen Volk (born 29 March 1954) is a former field hockey player from Zimbabwe, who was a member of the national team that won the gold medal at the 1980 Summer Olympics in Moscow.

Because of the boycott of the United States and other countries, only one team was available to compete in the Women's Field Hockey Tournament: the hosting USSR team. A late request was sent to the government of the African nation, which quickly assembled a team less than a week before the competition started. To everyone's surprise they won, claiming Zimbabwe's only medal in the 1980 Games.
