= Ann Grant =

Zimbabwean field hockey player (born 1955)

Personal information
- Born: Ann Mary Gwynne Fletcher; 6 May 1955 (age 71) Salisbury, Southern Rhodesia (now Harare, Zimbabwe)
Medal record
Women's Field Hockey
Representing Zimbabwe
Olympic Games
Gold medal – first place	1980 Moscow	Team competition

Ann Mary Gwynne Grant (née Fletcher; born 6 May 1955) is a former field hockey player from Zimbabwe, who captained the national team that won the gold medal at the 1980 Summer Olympics in Moscow.

Because of a boycott by western European, Australasian and other countries, the Women's Field Hockey Tournament contained fewer teams than normal. A late request was sent to the government of Zimbabwe, which quickly assembled a team less than a week before the competition started. To everyone's surprise they won, claiming Zimbabwe's only medal in the 1980 Games. Grant captained the team.

Grant is the sister of former Zimbabwe cricketer and England and India cricket coach Duncan Fletcher.
