= Gillian Cowley =

Zimbabwean field hockey player (born 1955)

Personal information
- Born: 8 July 1955 (age 70) Kitwe, Northern Rhodesia
Medal record
Women's Field Hockey
Representing Zimbabwe
Olympic Games
Gold medal – first place	1980 Moscow	Team competition

Gillian Margaret "Gill" Cowley (born 8 July 1955 in Kitwe, Northern Rhodesia) is a former hockey player from Zimbabwe, who was a member of the national team that won the gold medal at the 1980 Summer Olympics in Moscow.

Because of the boycott of the United States and other countries, only one team was available to compete in the Women's Hockey Tournament: the hosting USSR team. A late request was sent to the government of the African nation, which quickly assembled a team less than a week before the competition started. To everyone's surprise they won, claiming Zimbabwe's only medal in the 1980 Games. The team became known as the "Golden Girls."
