= Liz Chase =

Zimbabwean field hockey player (1950–2018)

Personal information
- Born: 26 April 1950 Umtali, Southern Rhodesia
- Died: 9 May 2018 (aged 68) Johannesburg, South Africa
Medal record
Women's field hockey
Representing Zimbabwe
Olympic Games
Gold medal – first place	1980 Moscow	Team competition

Elizabeth Muriel Chase (26 April 1950 – 9 May 2018) was a Zimbabwean field hockey player and member of the national team that won the gold medal at the 1980 Summer Olympics in Moscow. Previously, she represented South Africa.

Born in Umtali (today Mutare), Chase attended Girls High School in Salisbury (today Harare). She was on the national schools field hockey team in 1966, and later the national under-21 team. After graduating, she went to South Africa to get a degree in physical education. There, she played for the university varsity team and the local provincial sides of Wits and Southern Transvaal. In 1973/74 she was chosen to play for the South Africa B team, and in 1976/77 she represented the Springbok Ladies hockey team. During the 1970s, she lost friends and family in the Rhodesian Bush War.

Upon returning to Rhodesia, Chase played for the Old Hararians club and taught physical education at Oriel Girls High School in Salisbury. She was selected every year for the Zimbabwe women's national team before she emigrated to South Africa in the early 1980s. She worked as head of the physical education department at the University of the Witwatersrand in 2000 and retired in 2015.

Chase died of cancer on 9 May 2018 in Johannesburg, two weeks after her 68th birthday. She is the first member of the 1980 Olympic field hockey team to die.
