= Sarah English =

Zimbabwean field hockey player (born 1955)

Personal information
- Born: 28 November 1955 (age 70)
Medal record
Women's Field Hockey
Representing Zimbabwe
Olympic Games
Gold medal – first place	1980 Moscow	Team competition

Sarah English (born 28 November 1955) is a former field hockey player from Zimbabwe, who was a member of the national team that won the gold medal at the 1980 Summer Olympics in Moscow. She was known as the premier hockey goalkeeper in Zimbabwe.

Due to the boycott of the United States and other countries, only the hosting USSR team and one other team competed in the Women's Field Hockey Tournament. A last-minute request was sent to the Zimbabwean government, which hastily assembled a team less than a week before the competition. Surprisingly, Zimbabwe won the tournament, securing their sole medal at the 1980 Olympics.
