= Patricia Davies (field hockey) =

Zimbabwean field hockey player (born 1956)

Personal information
- Born: Patricia Joan Davies; 5 December 1956 (age 69)
- Height: 157 cm (5 ft 2 in)
- Weight: 60 kg (132 lb)

Sport
- Sport: Field hockey
Coaching career
- Years: Team
- 2016: Zimbabwe women under-21
- ?-present: Zimbabwe women
Medal record
Women's Field Hockey
Representing Zimbabwe
Olympic Games
Gold medal – first place	1980 Moscow	Team competition

Patricia ("Trish") Joan Davies (born 5 December 1956) is a former field hockey player from Zimbabwe, who was a member of the national team that won the gold medal at the 1980 Summer Olympics in Moscow.

Because of the boycott by the United States and other countries, only one team was available to compete in the Women's Field Hockey Tournament: the hosting USSR team. A late request was sent to the government of the African nation, which quickly assembled a team less than a week before the competition started. To everyone's surprise they won, claiming Zimbabwe's only medal in the 1980 Games.

She coached the Zimbabwe national team at the 2022 Women's Hockey Africa Cup of Nations. She coached the Zimbabwe women's junior is 2016 as 2016 Women's Hockey Junior World Cup and 2016 Women's Junior Africa cup for Nations.
