= Sonia Robertson =

Zimbabwean field hockey player (born 1947)

Personal information
- Born: 2 June 1947 (age 79) Burnham Market, United Kingdom
Medal record
Women's Field Hockey
Representing Zimbabwe
Olympic Games
Gold medal – first place	1980 Moscow	Team competition

Sonia Robertson (born 2 June 1947 in Burnham Market) is a former field hockey player from Zimbabwe, who was a member of the national team that won the gold medal at the 1980 Summer Olympics in Moscow. Her identical twin sister Sandra Chick was one of her teammates in the capital of the Soviet Union, and both are the first twin gold medalists in hockey.

Because of a boycott by western European, Australasian and other countries, the Women's Field Hockey Tournament contained fewer teams than normal. A late request was sent to the government of Zimbabwe, which quickly assembled a team less than a week before the competition started. To everyone's surprise they won, claiming Zimbabwe's only medal in the 1980 Games.
