= Anthea Stewart =

Zimbabwean field hockey player (born 1944)

Personal information
- Born: Anthea Dorine Stewart; 20 November 1944 (age 81) Blantyre, Nyasaland
Medal record
Women's field hockey
Representing Zimbabwe
Olympic Games
Gold medal – first place	1980 Moscow	Team competition

Anthea Dorine Stewart (born 20 November 1944) is a former field hockey player who was a member of the Zimbabwe national women's team that won the gold medal at the 1980 Summer Olympics in Moscow. Previously, she had represented South Africa between 1963 and 1974.

Because of the boycott of the United States and other countries, only one team was available to compete in the women's field hockey tournament: the hosting USSR team. A late request was sent to the government of Zimbabwe, which quickly assembled a team less than a week before the competition started. To everyone's surprise, they won, claiming Zimbabwe's only medal in the 1980 Games. Not only was it Zimbabwe's only medal, it was the first medal given for women's field hockey in Olympic history.

Stewart is the mother of international diver Evan Stewart, who competed in three consecutive Summer Olympics for his native country, starting in 1992 in Barcelona, Spain.
