= List of flag bearers for Zimbabwe at the Olympics =

Zimbabwe at the Olympics
- IOC code: ZIM
- NOC: Zimbabwe Olympic Committee
- Website: teamzim.org
- Medals: Gold 3 Silver 4 Bronze 1 Total 8

Summer appearances
- 1928; 1932–1956; 1960; 1964; 1968–1976; 1980; 1984; 1988; 1992; 1996; 2000; 2004; 2008; 2012; 2016; 2020; 2024

Winter appearances
- 2014; 2018–2026

This is a list of flag bearers who have represented Zimbabwe at the Olympics.

Flag bearers carry the national flag of their country at the opening ceremony of the Olympic Games.

#	Event year	Season	Flag bearer	Sport
1	1928	Summer		
2	1960	Summer		
3	1964	Summer	Lloyd Koch	Field hockey
4	1980	Summer	Abel Nkhoma	Athletics
5	1984	Summer	Zephaniah Ncube	Athletics
6	1988	Summer	James Gombedza	Athletics
7	1992	Summer		
8	1996	Summer	Tendai Chimusasa	Athletics
9	2000	Summer	Phillip Mukomana	Athletics
10	2004	Summer	Young Talkmore Nyongani	Athletics
11	2008	Summer	Brian Dzingai	Athletics
12	2012	Summer	Kirsty Coventry	Swimming
13	2014	Winter	Luke Steyn	Alpine skiing
14	2016	Summer	Kirsty Coventry	Swimming
15	2020	Summer	Peter Purcell-Gilpin	Rowing
15	2020	Summer	Donata Katai	Swimming
16	2024	Summer	Makanakaishe Charamba	Athletics
16	2024	Summer	Paige van der Westhuizen	Swimming

== See also ==
- Zimbabwe at the Olympics
