= Rhodesia at the Olympics =

- Rhodesia participated in the Olympics under the British colonial flag, not the flag of unrecognised state.
- IOC code: RHO
- Medals: Gold 0 Silver 0 Bronze 0 Total 0

Summer appearances
- 1928; 1932–1956; 1960; 1964; 1968–1976; 1980; 1984; 1988; 1992; 1996; 2000; 2004; 2008; 2012; 2016; 2020; 2024

Southern Rhodesia first participated as Rhodesia in the Olympic Games in 1928, when it sent two boxers to Amsterdam, both of whom were eliminated in their second bout. The colony did not appear at the Games under a Rhodesian banner until 1960, when it sent a fourteen-athlete delegation as part of the Federation of Rhodesia and Nyasaland. In Rome, two sailors, Alan David Butler and Christopher Bevan, finished fourth, which was Rhodesia's best result until it became Zimbabwe in 1980. Southern Rhodesia sent 29 competitors, including a field hockey team, to the 1964 Summer Games, which was its last Olympic appearance under the Rhodesian banner.

In 1965, Prime Minister Ian Smith declared a unilateral independence that allowed the country's white minority to dominate the government. The United Kingdom pressured the Mexican state to deny Rhodesia an invitation to the 1968 Summer Olympics and supported a proposed African boycott of the Games that ultimately prevented Rhodesia from taking part. The nation was positioned to compete at the Olympics in 1972 and reached the Olympic Village before a last-minute International Olympic Committee (IOC) decision barred its athletes from participating. The National Olympic Committee was expelled permanently in 1975 and Rhodesia never again participated under that banner. Rhodesia never took part in the Winter Olympic Games and no Rhodesian competitor ever won an Olympic medal, although it was able to continue competing at the Paralympics through 1972 and reached the podium on multiple occasions.

== 1928 Summer Olympics ==
Southern Rhodesia, under the banner of Rhodesia, first appeared at the Summer Olympic Games in 1928, where its delegation consisted of two boxers, Cecil Bissett and Leonard Hall. Bissett received a bye in the first round of the men's lightweight division and went on to defeat Mexican Carlos Orellana before being stopped by eventual gold medalist Carlo Orlandi of Italy. Leonard Hall, meanwhile, bested German William Walter in the opening round before losing to Kintaro Usuda of Japan. Rhodesia had been one of two British colonies granted permission to compete as its own entity at the Games (the other was Malta). The country débuted independently at the British Empire Games in 1934.

== 1960 and 1964 Summer Olympics ==
Southern Rhodesia did not appear at the Olympics again until 1960, although Rhodesian athletes had the option of competing internationally for South Africa. Leonard Hall, for example, won a gold medal in the welterweight division of the 1930 British Empire Games under the South African banner. By the time of the 1960 Summer Olympics, Southern Rhodesia was part of the Federation of Rhodesia and Nyasaland (which included what is now Malawi, Zambia, and Zimbabwe) that entered the Games under the banner of Rhodesia. Fourteen athletes — nine men and five women — took part in six sports: track and field, boxing, diving, sailing, shooting, and swimming. Competing in the Flying Dutchman class, sailors Alan David Butler and Christopher Bevan finished fourth, which was Rhodesia's best result under that name. After the Federation dissolved in 1963, Nyasaland became Malawi, while Northern and Southern Rhodesia began competing separately. The North entered the Games as Northern Rhodesia, but left under the flag of Zambia, while the South remained Southern Rhodesia. It sent 25 men (including its field hockey squad) and four women; both the field hockey team and the Flying Dutchman crew finished 11th, while no individual athlete placed better than 17th.

== Expulsion and aftermath ==
In 1965, Southern Rhodesian Prime Minister Ian Smith and his mostly white government unilaterally declared independence from the United Kingdom. The nation was invited to send a team to the 1968 Winter Olympics, but declined in the belief that its athletes were not sufficiently competitive. Despite political machinations from the United Kingdom, which expended considerable effort to exclude its former colony from gaining legitimacy by participating at the Games, Rhodesia was invited to participate at the 1968 Summer Olympics. The threat of an African boycott (supported by the British) of the Games, however, added further pressure from the Mexican government on the organizing committee to withdraw its invitation. Although South Africa had been barred from competing in 1964, Rhodesia's sports institutions were not de jure segregated, and thus the same rationale could not be applied. The British government also decided against adding Rhodesian Olympians to a "stop-list" of select Rhodesians who were banned entirely from international travel. Thus, the organizing committee used the pretense of United Nations Security Council Resolution 253, published May 29, 1968, which called on member nations to refuse to accept Rhodesian passports, to block Rhodesian athletes from participating. Although most potential participants had more than one passport, Mexico created bureaucratic delays that prevented Rhodesian athletes from attending, despite the Rhodesian government's repeated protests. Rhodesia's team had included at least nine individual athletes, a five-man yachting team, and a field hockey squad. Only two, track and field competitors Bernard Dzoma and Mathias Kanda, were not white, but both were considered medal contenders.

In 1971, the IOC offered Rhodesia the opportunity to compete in the upcoming 1972 Summer Olympics if it did so with a British identity, which included using the flag of Southern Rhodesia and "God Save the Queen" as their anthem, as it had in 1964. Host nation West Germany faced less pressure than Mexico and, having not been admitted to the United Nations, was not bound by Resolution 253. Rhodesia agreed and sent 44 athletes in eight sports (including a water polo squad) to Munich in its largest and most diverse delegation. Another threat of boycott from African nations, however, led the IOC to withdraw Rhodesia's invitation by a vote of 36–31 in favor, with three abstentions. The athletes were allowed to remain in the Olympic Village and attend their events, but were forbidden from participating. Following the Munich massacre, IOC President Avery Brundage compared the attacks to the political motivation behind the boycott, arguing that both were seeking to dampen the spirit of Olympism.

Hoping to preempt the Rhodesian issue far in advance of the 1976 Summer Olympics, incoming IOC President Lord Killanin sought to prove Rhodesia's racial discrimination in sport in order to use it to bar the National Olympic Committee permanently from the Games. Based on the evidence the organization was able to uncover, in 1975 the IOC voted 41–26 to expel Rhodesia from the Games on a permanent basis. The nation would not return to the Games until 1980, after the white-dominated government had fallen and the country had been renamed Zimbabwe. Rhodesia was still able to compete at the Paralympics in 1968 and 1972, as it had in 1960 and 1964, due to "deliberate decisions by politicians who were unwilling (for a variety of reasons) to invoke sanctions against disabled athletes." Although it was shut out of the podium at the Olympics, Rhodesia did win numerous medals at the Paralympics.

== Medal tables ==
=== Medals by Summer Games ===
Games	Athletes	Gold	Silver	Bronze	Total	Rank
1928 Amsterdam	2	0	0	0	0	–
1932–1956	did not participate					
1960 Rome	14	0	0	0	0	–
1964 Tokyo	29	0	0	0	0	–
1968 Mexico City	did not participate					
1972 Munich	did not participate					
1976 Montreal	did not participate					
1980–present	as Zimbabwe					
Total		0	0	0	0	–

== See also ==
- Rhodesia at the Paralympics
- Zimbabwe at the Olympics
- Apartheid-era South Africa and the Olympics
