= Zimbabwe at the 2025 World Aquatics Championships =

- Flag of Zimbabwe
- World Aquatics code: ZIM
- National federation: Zimbabwe Aquatic Union

in Singapore
- Competitors: 7 in 2 sports
- Medals: Gold 0 Silver 0 Bronze 0 Total 0

World Aquatics Championships appearances
- 1973; 1975; 1978; 1982; 1986; 1991; 1994; 1998; 2001; 2003; 2005; 2007; 2009; 2011; 2013; 2015; 2017; 2019; 2022; 2023; 2024; 2025

Zimbabwe competed at the 2025 World Aquatics Championships in Singapore from July 11 to August 3, 2025.

== Competitors ==
The following is the list of competitors in the Championships.

Sport	Men	Women	Total
Open water swimming	2	1	3
Swimming	2	2	4
Total	4	3	7

== Open water swimming ==
Men

Athlete	Event	Heat		Semi-final		Final	
Athlete	Event	Time	Rank	Time	Rank	Time	Rank
Jayden De Swardt	Men's 5 km	—				OTL	
Connor Grist	Men's 5 km	—				Did not finish	

Women

Athlete	Event	Heat		Semi-final		Final	
Athlete	Event	Time	Rank	Time	Rank	Time	Rank
Susie Worsfold	3 km knockout sprints	22:42.9	29	Did not advance			

== Swimming ==
Zimbabwe entered 4 swimmers.

Men

Athlete	Event	Heat		Semi-final		Final	
Athlete	Event	Time	Rank	Time	Rank	Time	Rank
Joash McKonie	50 m freestyle	24.21	74	Did not advance			
Joash McKonie	50 m butterfly	25.63	67	Did not advance			
Cory Werrett	100 m freestyle	51.93	63	Did not advance			
Cory Werrett	100 m breaststroke	1:07.23	65	Did not advance			

Women

Athlete	Event	Heat		Semi-final		Final	
Athlete	Event	Time	Rank	Time	Rank	Time	Rank
Anje Van As	100 m butterfly	1:02.63	42	Did not advance			
Anje Van As	200 m butterfly	2:19.43	23	Did not advance			
Paige van der Westhuizen	50 m freestyle	26.55	48	Did not advance			
Paige van der Westhuizen	100 m freestyle	57.70	42	Did not advance			
