= Zimbabwe at the 2023 World Aquatics Championships =

- Flag of Zimbabwe
- FINA code: ZIM
- National federation: Zimbabwe Aquatic Union

in Fukuoka, Japan
- Competitors: 4 in 1 sport

World Aquatics Championships appearances
- 1973; 1975; 1978; 1982; 1986; 1991; 1994; 1998; 2001; 2003; 2005; 2007; 2009; 2011; 2013; 2015; 2017; 2019; 2022; 2023; 2024

Zimbabwe is set to compete at the 2023 World Aquatics Championships in Fukuoka, Japan from 14 to 30 July.

== Swimming ==
Zimbabwe entered 4 swimmers.

Men

Athlete	Event	Heat		Semifinal		Final	
Athlete	Event	Time	Rank	Time	Rank	Time	Rank
Denilson Cyprianos	100 metre backstroke	57.29	46	Did not advance			
Denilson Cyprianos	200 metre backstroke	2:02.12	27	Did not advance			
Liam Davis	200 metre breaststroke	2:18.45	35	Did not advance			

Women

Athlete	Event	Heat		Semifinal		Final	
Athlete	Event	Time	Rank	Time	Rank	Time	Rank
Donata Katai	50 metre backstroke	30.21	43	Did not advance			
Donata Katai	100 metre backstroke	1:04.85	46	Did not advance			
Paige van der Westhuizen	100 metre freestyle	1:00.12	46	Did not advance			
Paige van der Westhuizen	200 metre freestyle	2:09.85	51	Did not advance			
