= Diving at the 1964 Summer Olympics – Women's 3 metre springboard =

Women's 3 metre springboard at the Games of the XVIII Olympiad
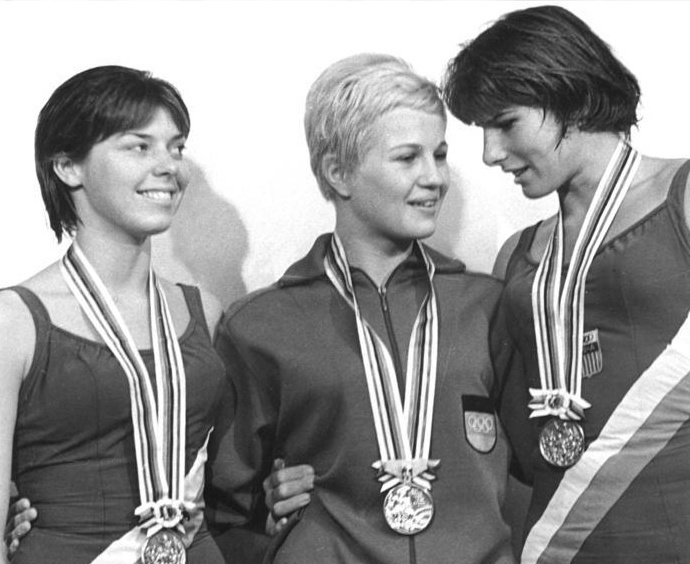
- Medal winners

Medalists
1st place, gold medalist(s)		Ingrid Engel-Krämer	United Team of Germany
2nd place, silver medalist(s)		Jeanne Collier	United States
3rd place, bronze medalist(s)		Patsy Willard	United States

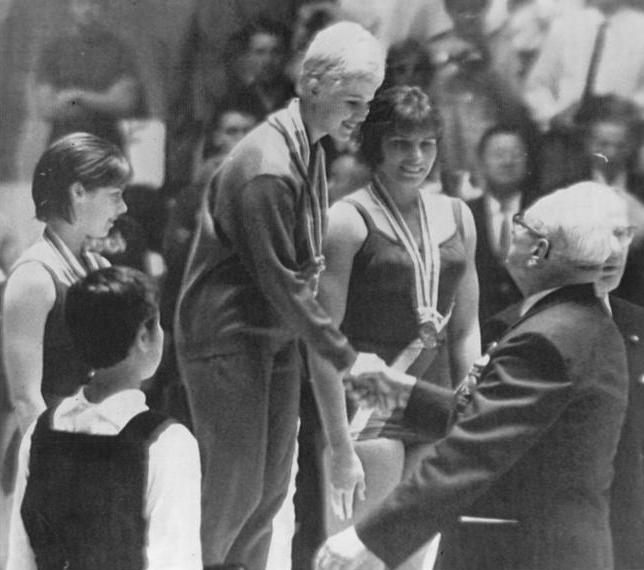
Medal ceremony.

The women's 3 metre springboard, also reported as high diving, was one of four diving events on the Diving at the 1964 Summer Olympics programme.

The competition was split into two phases:

1. Preliminary round (11 October)
  Divers performed five compulsory dives with limited degrees of difficulty and two voluntary dives without limits. The nine divers with the highest scores advanced to the final.
2. Final (12 October)
  Divers performed three voluntary dives without limit of degrees of difficulty. The final ranking was determined by the combined score with the preliminary round.

== Results ==
Rank	Diver	Nation	Preliminary		Final		
Rank	Diver	Nation	Points	Rank	Points	Rank	Total
1st place, gold medalist(s)	Ingrid Krämer	United Team of Germany	94.69	1	50.31	1	145.00
2nd place, silver medalist(s)	Jeanne Collier	United States	89.94	3	48.42	2	138.36
3rd place, bronze medalist(s)	Patsy Willard	United States	92.68	2	45.50	3	138.18
4	Sue Gossick	United States	89.29	4	40.41	5	129.70
5	Tamara Fyedosova	Soviet Union	85.85	6	40.48	4	126.33
6	Yelena Anokhina	Soviet Union	85.20	8	40.40	6	125.60
7	Kanoko Tsutani-Mabuchi	Japan	85.27	7	40.01	7	125.28
8	Angelika Hilbert	United Team of Germany	86.53	5	36.74	8	123.27
9	Kumiko Watanabe	Japan	84.40	9	35.94	9	120.34
10	Christiane Lanzke	United Team of Germany	82.56	10	did not advance		
11	Judy Stewart	Canada	82.39	11	did not advance		
12	Vera Baklanova	Soviet Union	82.04	12	did not advance		
13	Robyn Bradshaw	Australia	77.64	13	did not advance		
14	Susan Knight	Australia	76.76	14	did not advance		
15	Elisabeth Svoboda	Austria	75.45	15	did not advance		
16	Ingeborg Pertmayr	Austria	74.31	16	did not advance		
17	Lindsay Grant-Stuart	Rhodesia	74.28	17	did not advance		
18	Ulrike Sindelar-Pachowsky	Austria	70.27	18	did not advance		
19	Carol Ann Morrow	Canada	64.07	19	did not advance		
20	Sarie Bezuidenhout	Rhodesia	63.50	20	did not advance		
21	Kerstin Rybrant	Sweden	61.74	21	did not advance		

== Sources ==
- The Organising Committee for The Games of the XVIII Olympiad (October 1966). The Official Report of The Games of the XVIII Olympiad Tokyo 1964, Volume II (PDF). Tokyo: The Organising Committee for The Games of the XVIII Olympiad. pp. pp.551–2. Archived from the original (pdf) on 13 August 2011.
- Herman de Wael (9 October 2002). "Diving - women's springboard (Tokyo 1964)".
