= Felgate =

Felgate is a last name. Notable people with the surname include:

- Alice Felgate, actress who played Amber Dean, a character on Some Girls (TV series), a British TV series
- Christopher Felgate (born 1982), Zimbabwean Olympic triathlete
- Cynthia Felgate (1935–1991), British television producer
- David Felgate (disambiguation), several people
- Jacqueline Felgate (living), Australian journalist and television and radio presenter
- Michael Felgate (born 1981), English association football player
- Rhoda Felgate (1901–1990), English-born Australian theatre founder and director, speech and drama teacher and actress
- Walter Felgate (1930–2008), South African politician, businessman, and anthropologist

== See also ==
- John Stevens (Royal Navy officer) (1900–1989; middle name Felgate), British Royal Navy officer, vice admiral and Commander-in-Chief, America and West Indies Station
