= Zimbabwe at the 2024 World Aquatics Championships =

- Flag of Zimbabwe
- FINA code: ZIM
- National federation: Zimbabwe Aquatic Union

in Doha, Qatar
- Competitors: 4 in 1 sport
- Medals: Gold 0 Silver 0 Bronze 0 Total 0

World Aquatics Championships appearances
- 1973; 1975; 1978; 1982; 1986; 1991; 1994; 1998; 2001; 2003; 2005; 2007; 2009; 2011; 2013; 2015; 2017; 2019; 2022; 2023; 2024

Zimbabwe competed at the 2024 World Aquatics Championships in Doha, Qatar from 2 to 18 February.

== Competitors ==
The following is the list of competitors in the Championships.

Sport	Men	Women	Total
Swimming	2	2	4
Total	2	2	4

== Swimming ==
Zimbabwe entered 4 swimmers.

Men

Athlete	Event	Heat		Semifinal		Final	
Athlete	Event	Time	Rank	Time	Rank	Time	Rank
Denilson Cyprianos	100 metre backstroke	56.82	34	Did not advance			
Denilson Cyprianos	200 metre backstroke	2:04.70	26	Did not advance			
Liam Davis	200 metre breaststroke	2:18.89	26	Did not advance			

Women

Athlete	Event	Heat		Semifinal		Final	
Athlete	Event	Time	Rank	Time	Rank	Time	Rank
Donata Katai	50 metre backstroke	29.52	32	Did not advance			
Donata Katai	100 metre backstroke	1:04.51	36	Did not advance			
Paige van der Westhuizen	50 metre freestyle	26.86	51	Did not advance			
Paige van der Westhuizen	100 metre freestyle	58.66	36	Did not advance			
