= Southern Rhodesia at the 1964 Summer Olympics =

Rhodesia at the 1964 Summer Olympics
- Flag of Southern Rhodesia
- IOC code: RHO
- NOC: Rhodesia Olympic Committee

in Tokyo
- Competitors: 29 (25 men, 4 women) in 7 sports
- Flag bearer: Lloyd Koch
- Medals: Gold 0 Silver 0 Bronze 0 Total 0

Summer Olympics appearances (overview)
- 1928; 1932–1956; 1960; 1964; 1968–1976; 1980; 1984; 1988; 1992; 1996; 2000; 2004; 2008; 2012; 2016; 2020; 2024

Southern Rhodesia competed as Rhodesia at the 1964 Summer Olympics in Tokyo, Japan. 29 competitors, 25 men and 4 women, took part in 15 events in 7 sports. It was the last of three appearances at the Summer Olympics by a Rhodesian representation; Zimbabwe would make its first appearance at the 1980 Summer Olympics.

== Diving ==
Men

Athlete	Event	Preliminary		Final			
Athlete	Event	Points	Rank	Points	Rank	Total	Rank
Terry Rossiter	3 m springboard	61.06	27	Did not advance			
Terry Rossiter	10 m platform	79.23	28	Did not advance			

Women

Athlete	Event	Preliminary		Final			
Athlete	Event	Points	Rank	Points	Rank	Total	Rank
Sarie Bezuidenhout	3 m springboard	63.50	20	Did not advance			
Lindsay Grant-Stuart	3 m springboard	74.28	17	Did not advance			
Sarie Bezuidenhout	10 m platform	37.59	22	Did not advance			

== Field hockey ==
Men's Roster

- Dereck Brain
- Beverly Faulds
- Kevin van Blomestein
- John McPhun
- William Turpin
- Tinker Beets
- Ian Mackay
- Roy Barbour
- Lloyd Koch
- Anthony Charles "Tony" Unger
- Robert Robertson
- Robert Ullyett
- Des Tomlinson
- Ronald Spence
- Graham Cumming

=== Preliminary round ===
==== Pool A ====
Pos	Team	Pld	W	D	L	GF	GA	GD	Pts	Qualification
1	Pakistan	6	6	0	0	17	3	+14	12	Advanced to Semi-finals
2	Australia	6	4	0	2	16	5	+11	8	Advanced to Semi-finals
3	Kenya	6	3	1	2	7	9	−2	7	
4	Japan (H)	6	3	0	3	6	6	0	6	
5	Great Britain	6	2	0	4	5	12	−7	4	
6	Rhodesia	6	1	1	4	4	16	−12	3	
7	New Zealand	6	1	0	5	6	10	−4	2	

Source: FIH
Rules for classification: 1) points; 2) goal difference; 3) games won; 4) head-to-head result.
(H) Hosts

11 October 1964
10:00

Rhodesia	0–0	Kenya
	Report

Umpires:
Sundaram Mudaliar (IND)
J.J. Jameson (IND)

12 October 1964
11:40

Australia	3–0	Rhodesia
McWatters 19'; Pearce 32', 42'	Report

Umpires:
J. Abraham van Donselaar (NED)
Gurusewak Singh (IND)

13 October 1964
10:00

Rhodesia	1–4	Great Britain
Ullyett 16'	Report	Deegan 20', 21'; Cadman 46', 57'

Umpires:
Gurusewak Singh (IND)
Rino Lelli (ITA)

16 October 1964
11:40

Pakistan	6–0	Rhodesia
Afzal 6', 18', 57'; Mahmood 19'; Asad 22'; Hussain 62'	Report

Umpires:
Henry Douglas Kelly (NZL)
M.C. McLaren (GBR)

18 October 1964
14:15

Rhodesia	1–2	Japan
Spence 69'	Report	Takashima 34', 50'

Umpires:
Iqbal Hussain (PAK)
S.M. Ayub (PAK)

19 October 1964
11:40

New Zealand	1–2	Rhodesia
Patterson 61'	Report	Koch 67'; Tomlinson 68'

Umpires:
Lyle Thomson (GBR)
Rino Lelli (ITA)

== Sailing ==
Athlete	Event	Hull Sail No.	Race I		Race II		Race III		Race IV		Race V		Race VI		Race VII		Total Points	Total -1
Athlete	Event	Hull Sail No.	Rank	Points	Rank	Points	Rank	Points	Rank	Points	Rank	Points	Rank	Points	Rank	Points	Total Points	Total -1
Michael McFadden	Finn	KR 24	6	841	~~27~~	~~188~~	10	620	17	389	7	774	23	258	24	239	3309	3121
Alan David Butler Anthony Crossley	Flying Dutchman	KR 184	3	946	8	520	~~DNF~~	~~101~~	6	645	4	821	9	469	15	247	3749	3648

== Shooting ==
Two shooters represented Rhodesia in 1964.

Trap

- Johannes Lamprecht
- Jack Rickards

== Swimming ==
Women

Athlete	Event	Heat		Semifinal		Final	
Athlete	Event	Time	Rank	Time	Rank	Time	Rank
Marilyn Sidelsky	100 m freestyle	1:05.5	32	Did not advance			
Marilyn Sidelsky	400 m freestyle	5:08.9	26	—N/a		Did not advance	
Jenny Wood	100 m butterfly	1:11.3	21	Did not advance			
