= Zimbabwe at the 2020 Summer Olympics =

- IOC code: ZIM
- NOC: Zimbabwe Olympic Committee

in Tokyo, Japan July 23, 2021 – August 8, 2021
- Competitors: 5 in 4 sports
- Flag bearers (opening): Donata Katai; Peter Purcell-Gilpin
- Flag bearer (closing): Scott Vincent
- Medals: Gold 0 Silver 0 Bronze 0 Total 0

Summer Olympics appearances (overview)
- 1928; 1932–1956; 1960; 1964; 1968–1976; 1980; 1984; 1988; 1992; 1996; 2000; 2004; 2008; 2012; 2016; 2020; 2024

Zimbabwe competed at the 2020 Summer Olympics in Tokyo. Originally scheduled to take place from 24 July to 9 August 2020, the Games were postponed to 23 July to 8 August 2021, due to the COVID-19 pandemic. It is the nation's tenth consecutive appearance at the Summer Olympics as an independent nation under the name Zimbabwe, after appearing as Southern Rhodesia and Rhodesia in the colonial era.

The Zimbabwe Olympic Committee (ZOC) stood with five athletes at the Olympiad, which was the second-smallest Zimbabwean team since their debut in 1928. For the third consecutive Olympiad, Zimbabwe left the games without any medals. Golfer Scott Vincent was the only Zimbabwean athlete within reach of the medals. He tied for sixteenth place in men's golf, finishing four strokes behind bronze medalist Pan Cheng-tsung.

== Competitors ==
The following is the list of number of competitors in the Games.

Sport	Men	Women	Total
Athletics	1	0	1
Golf	1	0	1
Rowing	1	0	1
Swimming	1	1	2
Total	4	1	5

== Athletics ==
Zimbabwe received a universality slot from the World Athletics to send a male track and field athlete to the Olympics.

Key

- Note–Ranks given for track events are within the athlete's heat only
- Q = Qualified for the next round
- q = Qualified for the next round as a fastest loser or, in field events, by position without achieving the qualifying target
- NR = National record
- N/A = Round not applicable for the event
- Bye = Athlete not required to compete in round

Track & road events

Athlete	Event	Heat		Quarterfinal		Semifinal		Final	
Athlete	Event	Result	Rank	Result	Rank	Result	Rank	Result	Rank
Ngoni Makusha	Men's 100 m	10.32	1 Q	10.43	7	Did not advance			

== Golf ==
Zimbabwe entered one golfer for the first time into the Olympic tournament. Scott Vincent (world no. 239) qualified directly among the top 60 eligible players for the men's event based on the IGF World Rankings.

Athlete	Event	Round 1	Round 2	Round 3	Round 4	Total		
Athlete	Event	Score	Score	Score	Score	Score	Par	Rank
Scott Vincent	Men's	73	67	66	67	273	−11	=16

== Rowing ==
Zimbabwe qualified one boat in the men's single sculls for the Games by winning the silver medal and securing the second of five berths available at the 2019 FISA African Olympic Qualification Regatta in Tunis, Tunisia.

Athlete	Event	Heats		Repechage		Quarterfinals		Semifinals		Final	
Athlete	Event	Time	Rank	Time	Rank	Time	Rank	Time	Rank	Time	Rank
Peter Purcell-Gilpin	Men's single sculls	7:10.65	4 R	7:35.16	1 QF	7:37.97	6 SC/D	7:01.72	4 FD	7:03.85	20

Qualification Legend: FA=Final A (medal); FB=Final B (non-medal); FC=Final C (non-medal); FD=Final D (non-medal); FE=Final E (non-medal); FF=Final F (non-medal); SA/B=Semifinals A/B; SC/D=Semifinals C/D; SE/F=Semifinals E/F; QF=Quarterfinals; R=Repechage

== Swimming ==
Zimbabwe received a universality invitation from FINA to send two top-ranked swimmers (one per gender) in their respective individual events to the Olympics, based on the FINA Points System of June 28, 2021.

Athlete	Event	Heat		Semifinal		Final	
Athlete	Event	Time	Rank	Time	Rank	Time	Rank
Peter Wetzlar	Men's 100 m freestyle	50.31	42	Did not advance			
Donata Katai	Women's 100 m backstroke	1:02.73	34	Did not advance			
