= 1930 European Amateur Boxing Championships =

Boxing competitions

- Host city: Budapest
- Country: Hungary
- Nations: 11
- Athletes: 64
- Dates: 4–8 June

The 1930 European Amateur Boxing Championships were held in Budapest, Hungary from 4 to 8 June. It was the third edition of the competition, organised by the European governing body for amateur boxing, EABA. There were 64 fighters from 11 countries participating.

== Medal winners ==
Event	Gold	Silver	Bronze
Flyweight (– 50.8 kilograms)	István Énekes; Hungary	Mieczysław Forlański; Poland	Carlo Trombetta; Italy
Bantamweight (– 53.5 kilograms)	János Széles; Hungary	Mario Plaesu; Romania	Edelweis Rodriguez; Italy
Featherweight (– 57.1 kilograms)	Gyula Szabó; Hungary	Cesare Saracini; Italy	Nicolae Carata; Romania
Lightweight (– 61.2 kilograms)	Mario Bianchini; Italy	Sándor Szobolevszky; Hungary	Kaarlo Väkevä; Finland
Welterweight (– 66.7 kilograms)	Jupp Besselmann; Germany	Witold Majchrzycki; Poland	Karl Dehn; Norway
Middleweight (– 72.6 kilograms)	Clemente Meroni; Italy	Lajos Szigeti; Hungary	John Andersson; Sweden
Light Heavyweight (– 79.4 kilograms)	Thyge Petersen; Denmark	Albert Leidmann; Germany	Mario Lenzi; Italy
Heavyweight (+ 79.4 kilograms)	Michael Michaelsen; Denmark	Bertil Molander; Sweden	Heinz Hinzmann; Germany

== Medal table ==
Rank	Nation	Gold	Silver	Bronze	Total
1	Hungary (HUN)	3	2	0	5
2	Italy (ITA)	2	1	3	6
3	Denmark (DEN)	2	0	0	2
4	Germany (GER)	1	1	1	3
5	Poland (POL)	0	2	0	2
6	Romania (ROU)	0	1	1	2
6	Sweden (SWE)	0	1	1	2
8	Finland (FIN)	0	0	1	1
8	Norway (NOR)	0	0	1	1
Totals (9 entries)		8	8	8	24
