= Zimbabwe at the 2024 Summer Olympics =

- IOC code: ZIM
- NOC: Zimbabwe Olympic Committee

in Paris, France 26 July 2024 – 11 August 2024
- Competitors: 7 (5 men and 2 women) in 3 sports
- Flag bearers: Makanakaishe Charamba & Paige van der Westhuizen
- Officials: 15
- Medals: Gold 0 Silver 0 Bronze 0 Total 0

Summer Olympics appearances (overview)
- 1928; 1932–1956; 1960; 1964; 1968–1976; 1980; 1984; 1988; 1992; 1996; 2000; 2004; 2008; 2012; 2016; 2020; 2024

Zimbabwe competed at the 2024 Summer Olympics in Paris from 26 July to 11 August 2024. It was the nation's eleventh consecutive appearance at the Summer Olympics as an independent nation under the name Zimbabwe, after appearing as Southern Rhodesia and Rhodesia in the colonial era, except for 1932, 1936, 1948, 1952, 1956, 1968, due to the Mexican government's interpretation of regulations on passports, 1972, as well as the nation's withdrawal, 1976, as the nation joined the African boycott, and the nation's independence in 1979, and it has been participated in every Olympics since 1980.

== Competitors ==
The following is the list of number of competitors in the Games.

Sport	Men	Women	Total
Athletics	3	1	4
Rowing	1	0	1
Swimming	1	1	2
Total	5	2	7

== Athletics ==
Zimbabwean track and field athletes achieved the entry standards for Paris 2024, either by passing the direct qualifying mark (or time for track and road races), by world ranking, or by receiving the universality spots, in the following events (a maximum of 3 athletes each):

Key

- Note–Ranks given for track events are within the athlete's heat only
- Q = Qualified for the next round
- q = Qualified for the next round as a fastest loser or, in field events, by position without achieving the qualifying target
- NR = National record
- N/A = Round not applicable for the event
- Bye = Athlete not required to compete in round

Track and road events

Athlete	Event	Heat		Repechage		Semifinal		Final	
Athlete	Event	Result	Rank	Result	Rank	Result	Rank	Result	Rank
Makanakaishe Charamba	Men's 200 metres	20.27	2 Q	Bye		20.31	3 q	20.53	8
Tapiwanashe Makarawu	Men's 200 metres	20.07	2 Q	Bye		20.16	3 q	20.10	6
Isaac Mpofu	Men's marathon	—N/a						2:10:09	19
Rutendo Nyahora	Women's marathon	—N/a						DNF	

== Rowing ==
Zimbabwe rowers have qualified one boat in the men's single sculls through the 2023 African Qualification Regatta in Tunis, Tunisia.

Athlete	Event	Heats		Repechage		Quarterfinals		Semifinals		Final	
Athlete	Event	Time	Rank	Time	Rank	Time	Rank	Time	Rank	Time	Rank
Stephen Cox	Men's single sculls	7:11.98	4 R	7:22.45	4 SE/F	Bye		7:36.59	2 FE	7:09.34	29

Qualification Legend: FA=Final A (medal); FB=Final B (non-medal); FC=Final C (non-medal); FD=Final D (non-medal); FE=Final E (non-medal); FF=Final F (non-medal); SA/B=Semifinals A/B; SC/D=Semifinals C/D; SE/F=Semifinals E/F; QF=Quarterfinals; R=Repechage

== Swimming ==
Zimbabwe sent two swimmers to compete at the 2024 Paris Olympics.

Athlete	Event	Heat		Semifinal		Final	
Athlete	Event	Time	Rank	Time	Rank	Time	Rank
Denilson Cyprianos	Men's 200 m backstroke	2:01.91	28	Did not advance			
Paige van der Westhuizen	Women's 100 m freestyle	58.19	25	Did not advance			
