= Zimbabwe at the 2022 World Aquatics Championships =

- Flag of Zimbabwe
- FINA code: ZIM
- National federation: Zimbabwe Aquatic Union

in Budapest, Hungary
- Competitors: 3 in 1 sport
- Medals: Gold 0 Silver 0 Bronze 0 Total 0

World Aquatics Championships appearances
- 1973; 1975; 1978; 1982; 1986; 1991; 1994; 1998; 2001; 2003; 2005; 2007; 2009; 2011; 2013; 2015; 2017; 2019; 2022; 2023; 2024

Zimbabwe competed at the 2022 World Aquatics Championships in Budapest, Hungary from 18 June to 3 July.

== Swimming ==
Zimbabwean swimmers have achieved qualifying standards in the following events.

Athlete	Event	Heat		Semifinal		Final	
Athlete	Event	Time	Rank	Time	Rank	Time	Rank
Liam Davis	Men's 200 m breaststroke	2:19.62	32	did not advance			
Donata Katai	Women's 50 m backstroke	29.81	25	did not advance			
Donata Katai	Women's 100 m backstroke	1:04.80	33	did not advance			
Nomvula Mjimba	Women's 50 m freestyle	28.13	54	did not advance			
Nomvula Mjimba	Women's 100 m freestyle	1:02.20	46	did not advance			
