= Haakon Lind =

Norwegian boxer

Haakon Lind (August 11, 1906 – June 28, 1955) was a Norwegian boxer who competed in the 1928 Summer Olympics.

In 1928 he was eliminated in the first round of the lightweight class after losing his fight to Franz Dübbers.
