= Kazys Markevičius =

Lithuanian boxer (1905–1980)

Personal information
- Nationality: Lithuanian
- Born: 28 January 1905 Liepāja, Russian Empire
- Died: 21 August 1980 (aged 75) Boston, Massachusetts, United States

Sport
- Sport: Boxing
- Event: Lightweight

Kazys Markevičius (28 January 1905 – 21 August 1980) was a Lithuanian boxer.

Markevičius competed at the 1928 Summer Olympics in Amsterdam, he entered the men's lightweight contest, but in the first round he lost on points to Frenchman, Georges Carcagne, so he did not advance any further.
