= Zimbabwe at the Olympics =

- IOC code: ZIM
- NOC: Zimbabwe Olympic Committee
- Website: teamzim.org
- Medals Ranked 86th: Gold 3 Silver 4 Bronze 1 Total 8

Summer appearances
- 1928; 1932–1956; 1960; 1964; 1968–1976; 1980; 1984; 1988; 1992; 1996; 2000; 2004; 2008; 2012; 2016; 2020; 2024

Winter appearances
- 2014; 2018–2026

Zimbabwe participated for the first time at the Olympic Games under its current name in 1980, and has sent athletes to compete in every Summer Olympic Games since then. Previously, it competed at the Games under the name Rhodesia in 1928, 1960 and 1964. The 2014 Winter Olympics in Sochi marked the nation's first participation (as for 2026 only participation) at the Winter Olympic Games, with Luke Steyn, the Zimbabwean born athlete participating in alpine skiing.

Zimbabwean athletes have won a total of eight medals – three golds, four silvers and one bronze – in two sports. Seven medals were won by swimmer and current IOC President, Kirsty Coventry in 2004 and 2008; the remaining medal was the result of a victory by the women's national field hockey team in 1980.

The National Olympic Committee for Zimbabwe was created in 1934 and recognised by the International Olympic Committee in 1980.

== History ==
Southern Rhodesia (now Zimbabwe) first participated as Rhodesia in the Olympic Games in 1928. Rhodesia was then absent until 1960 when the Federation of Rhodesia and Nyasaland competed under the name of Rhodesia in Rome. Southern Rhodesia then competed alone under the banner of Rhodesia once again and for the last time in 1964. The country thus always competed as a British territory. It was unable to take part in the 1968 Games in Mexico, due to the Mexican government's interpretation of regulations on passports. It never successfully competed following Ian Smith's declaration of an independent Rhodesian republic in 1970. Although it returned to the Games in 1972, Rhodesia was expelled by the International Olympic Committee four days before the opening ceremony, under pressure from other African countries, which did not recognise the legitimacy of the Rhodesian state and threatened a boycott. The invitation which had been extended to Rhodesia was withdrawn by the IOC, by 36 votes to 31 with three abstentions. Rhodesia remained out of the 1976 Summer Olympics after the IOC inspected the country's sporting facilities and groups and found them underwhelming, voting for their expulsion from the committee.

The country's successor state, Zimbabwe, made its Olympic début in 1980, the year of the country's independence. Until 2012, Zimbabwe had always been the penultimate nation marching in the parade of nations ahead the host country, it is now ahead of the next host country before the hosts that began in 2020, exception was made in 2016 when Refugee Olympic Team was ahead of the host country at the time, Brazil.

== Medal tables ==
=== Medals by Summer Games ===
Games	Athletes	Gold	Silver	Bronze	Total	Rank
as Rhodesia
1928 Amsterdam	2	0	0	0	0	–
1932–1956	did not participate					
1960 Rome	14	0	0	0	0	–
1964 Tokyo	29	0	0	0	0	–
1968 Mexico City	did not participate					
1972 Munich	did not participate					
1976 Montreal	did not participate					
as Zimbabwe
1980 Moscow	42	1	0	0	1	23
1984 Los Angeles	15	0	0	0	0	–
1988 Seoul	29	0	0	0	0	–
1992 Barcelona	19	0	0	0	0	–
1996 Atlanta	13	0	0	0	0	–
2000 Sydney	16	0	0	0	0	–
2004 Athens	12	1	1	1	3	49
2008 Beijing	13	1	3	0	4	38
2012 London	7	0	0	0	0	–
2016 Rio de Janeiro	31	0	0	0	0	–
2020 Tokyo	5	0	0	0	0	–
2024 Paris	7	0	0	0	0	–
2028 Los Angeles	future event					
2032 Brisbane	future event					
Total		3	4	1	8	86

=== Medals by Winter Games ===
Games	Athletes	Gold	Silver	Bronze	Total	Rank
2014 Sochi	1	0	0	0	0	–
2018 Pyeongchang	did not participate					
2022 Beijing	did not participate					
2026 Milano Cortina	did not participate					
2030 French Alps	future event					
2034 Utah	future event					
Total		0	0	0	0	–

=== Medals by summer sport ===
Sport	Gold	Silver	Bronze	Total
Swimming	2	4	1	7
Field hockey	1	0	0	1
Totals (2 entries)	3	4	1	8

== List of medalists ==
Medal	Name	Games	Sport	Event
Gold	Field hockey team: Arlene Boxhall Liz Chase Sandra Chick Gillian Cowley Patricia Davies Sarah English Maureen George Ann Grant Susan Huggett Patricia McKillop Brenda Phillips Christine Prinsloo Sonia Robertson Anthea Stewart Helen Volk Linda Watson	1980 Moscow	Field hockey	Women's competition
Gold	Kirsty Coventry	2004 Athens	Swimming	Women's 200-metre backstroke
Gold	Kirsty Coventry	2008 Beijing	Swimming	Women's 200-metre backstroke
Silver	Kirsty Coventry	2004 Athens	Swimming	Women's 100-metre backstroke
Silver	Kirsty Coventry	2008 Beijing	Swimming	Women's 400-metre individual medley
Silver	Kirsty Coventry	2008 Beijing	Swimming	Women's 100-metre backstroke
Silver	Kirsty Coventry	2008 Beijing	Swimming	Women's 200-metre individual medley
Bronze	Kirsty Coventry	2004 Athens	Swimming	Women's 200-metre individual medley

== See also ==
- Category:Olympic competitors for Zimbabwe
- Rhodesia at the Olympics
- Zimbabwe at the Paralympics
- List of flag bearers for Zimbabwe at the Olympics
- Tropical nations at the Winter Olympics
