= Zimbabwe at the 1984 Summer Olympics =

- IOC code: ZIM
- NOC: Zimbabwe Olympic Committee

in Los Angeles
- Competitors: 15 (12 men and 3 women) in 5 sports
- Flag bearer: Zephaniah Ncube
- Medals: Gold 0 Silver 0 Bronze 0 Total 0

Summer Olympics appearances (overview)
- 1928; 1932–1956; 1960; 1964; 1968–1976; 1980; 1984; 1988; 1992; 1996; 2000; 2004; 2008; 2012; 2016; 2020; 2024; 2028

Zimbabwe competed at the 1984 Summer Olympics in Los Angeles, United States. This was the fifth time that Zimbabwe had competed at an Olympic Games with the first three as Rhodesia. 15 competitors, 12 men and 3 women, took part in 18 events in 5 sports.

== Background ==
Zimbabwe first competed at the 1928 games in Amsterdam, Netherlands as Rhodesia. Before the 1984 edition, they had participated in four Summer Olympics before this edition. They were meant to enter the 1972 Olympics in Munich but the invitation was removed by the IOC after the African countries threaten to boycott the games. Zimbabwe would send 15 competitors to the 1984 games with the most being the sport of Athletics with 6 athletes coming from that sport. Zephaniah Ncube who competed in the Athletics was the flag bearer for Zimbabwe at the 1984 Olympics.

== Athletics ==
Men's 200 metres

- Christopher Madzokere

- Heat – 22.75 (did not advance)

Men's 400 metres

- Christopher Madzokere

- Heat – 48.49 (did not advance)

Men's 800 metres

- Tapfumaneyi Jonga

- Heat – 1:49.59 (did not advance)

Men's 1,500 metres

- Tapfumaneyi Jonga

- Heat – 3:40.42 (advance to semi final)
- Semi final – 3:41.80 (Rank 11 did not advance)

Men's 5,000 metres

- Zephaniah Ncube

- Heat – 13:46.33
- Semifinals – 13:53.25 (did not advance)

Men's 10,000 metres

- Zephaniah Ncube

- Qualifying Heat – 28:28.53
- Final – 28:31.61 (11th place)

Men's Marathon

- Patrick Nyambarito – 2:37:18 (67th place)
- Tommy Lazarus – did not finish (no ranking)

Women's Discus Throw

- Mariette Van Heerden

- Qualification – 50.54 m (did not advance)

== Boxing ==
Zimbabwe was represented by three athletes in the boxing at the 1984 Olympics, each of them competing in their first Olympics. 25 year old boxer, Ndaba Dube competed in the bantamweight division. He won his opening match on 2 August against fellow African Amon Neequaye. The round of 16 match was held three days later with Louis Gomis being his opponent. He would win in a clean sweep before going on to lose in the quarter-finals three days later against Mexican boxer Héctor López. The other two boxers had first up loses. Ambrose Mlilo competed in the light middleweight division, where he would lose in the opening round of the competition to Manfred Zielonka from West Germany while in the middleweight division, Arigoma Chiponda lost to Tom Corr from Ireland in a clean sweep.

Name	Event	Round of 64	Round of 32	Round of 16	Quarterfinals	Semifinals	Final
Name	Event	Opposition Result	Opposition Result	Opposition Result	Opposition Result	Opposition Result	Opposition Result
Ndaba Dube	Bantamweight	Bye	Neequaye (GHA); W 5-0	Gomis (FRA); W 5-0	López (MEX); L 0-5	did not advance	
Ambrose Mlilo	Light Middleweight	Bye	Zielonka (FRG); L 1-4	did not advance			
Arigoma Chiponda	Middleweight	—N/a	Corr (IRL); L 0-5	did not advance			

== Diving ==
Women

Athlete	Event	Preliminary		Final	
Athlete	Event	Points	Rank	Points	Rank
Lesley Smith	3 m Springboard	438.72	10 Q	451.89	7
Antonette Wilken	3 m Springboard	414.66	15	did not advance	

== Sailing ==
Mixed One Person Dinghy

- Guy Grossmith

Rank 23

== Shooting ==
Men's Air Rifle (10 metres)

- Dennis Hardman

Rank 49 Points: 548, (90,90,92,92,95,89)

Men's Small–Bore Rifle Three Positions (50 metres)

- Dennis Hardman

Rank 43 Points: 1101, Standing 340 (83,86,82,89), Kneeling 371 (91,91,96,93), Prone 390 (98,97,98,97)

Men's Small-Bore Rifle Prone (50 metres)

- Dennis Hardman

Rank 67 Points: 569 (94,95,93,94,95,98)

Mixed Trap

- Clive Conolly

Rank 22 Points: 181

Mixed Skeet

- Bob Warren-Codrington

Rank 62 Points: 167
