= Zimbabwe at the 1988 Summer Olympics =

- IOC code: ZIM
- NOC: Zimbabwe Olympic Committee

in Seoul
- Competitors: 29 (23 men and 6 women) in 10 sports
- Flag bearer: James Gombedza
- Medals: Gold 0 Silver 0 Bronze 0 Total 0

Summer Olympics appearances (overview)
- 1928; 1932–1956; 1960; 1964; 1968–1976; 1980; 1984; 1988; 1992; 1996; 2000; 2004; 2008; 2012; 2016; 2020; 2024; 2028

Zimbabwe competed at the 1988 Summer Olympics in Seoul, South Korea. 29 competitors, 23 men and 6 women, took part in 38 events in 10 sports.

== Competitors ==
The following is the list of number of competitors in the Games.

Sport	Men	Women	Total
Archery	3	1	4
Athletics	5	2	7
Boxing	3	–	3
Cycling	2	0	2
Diving	0	1	1
Judo	2	–	2
Sailing	1	0	1
Shooting	2	0	2
Swimming	3	1	4
Tennis	2	1	3
Total	23	6	29

== Archery ==
After not competing in the 1984 archery competition, Zimbabwe returned in 1988.

Men

Athlete	Event	Ranking round		Round 1		Quarterfinals		Semifinals		Final	
Athlete	Event	Score	Rank	Score	Rank	Score	Rank	Score	Rank	Score	Rank
Paul Bamber	Individual	1197	60	Did not advance							
Alan Bryant	Individual	1149	72	Did not advance							
Wrex Tarr	Individual	1092	78	Did not advance							
Paul Bamber; Alan Bryant; Wrex Tarr	Team	3438	21	—N/a				Did not advance			

Women

Athlete	Event	Ranking round		Round 1		Quarterfinals		Semifinals		Final	
Athlete	Event	Score	Rank	Score	Rank	Score	Rank	Score	Rank	Score	Rank
Merrellyn Tarr	Individual	1015	62	Did not advance							

== Athletics ==
Men's 400 metres

- Elijah Nkala

- Heat — 46.60 (→ did not advance)

Men's 10.000 metres

- Stanley Mandebele

- Heat — 29:50.99 (→ did not advance)

Men's Marathon

- James Gombedza — 2"38.13 (→ 72nd place)

Women's Marathon

- Linda Hunter — 2"53.17 (→ 55th place)

== Boxing ==
Athlete	Event	Round of 64	Round of 32	Round of 16	Quarterfinals	Semifinals	Final	
Athlete	Event	Opposition Result	Opposition Result	Opposition Result	Opposition Result	Opposition Result	Opposition Result	Rank
Nokuthula Tshabangu	Flyweight	García (ESP); W 4–1	Kim (KOR); L RSC R2	Did not advance				
Ndaba Dube	Bantamweight	Francis (ANT); W RSC R2	Artemyev (URS); L RSC R1	Did not advance				
Duke Chinyadza	Light welterweight	Bye	Możdżeń (POL); W 3–2	Rodríguez (MEX); L KO	Did not advance			

== Cycling ==
Two male cyclists represented Zimbabwe in 1988.

=== Road ===
Men

Athlete	Event	Time	Rank
Pierre Gouws	Road race	4:43:28	99
Gary Mandy	Road race	4:45:50	105

=== Track ===
Time trial

Athlete	Event	Time	Rank
Gary Mandy	Time trial	1:08.474	20

== Diving ==
Women

Athlete	Event	Qualification		Final	
Athlete	Event	Points	Rank	Points	Rank
Tracy Cox-Smyth	3 metre springboard	430.86	12 Q	417.42	12

== Judo ==
Athlete	Event	Round of 64	Round of 32	Round of 16	Quarterfinals	Semifinals	Repechage			Final	
Athlete	Event	Round of 64	Round of 32	Round of 16	Quarterfinals	Semifinals	Round 1	Round 2	Round 3	Final	
Athlete	Event	Opposition Result	Opposition Result	Opposition Result	Opposition Result	Opposition Result	Opposition Result	Opposition Result	Opposition Result	Opposition Result	Rank
James Sibenge	71 kg	d'Assunção (POR); L Ippon	Did not advance								
Patrick Matangi	78 kg	Bye	Tsay (TPE); W Ippon	Metsola (FIN); L Ippon	Did not advance						

== Sailing ==
Open

Athlete	Event	Race							Net points	Final rank
Athlete	Event	1	2	3	4	5	6	7	Net points	Final rank
Vernon Lapham	Division II	47	46	44	46	~~52~~	47	52	282	43

== Shooting ==
Men

Athlete	Event	Qualification		Final	
Athlete	Event	Points	Rank	Points	Rank
Kenneth Johnston	50 metre rifle prone	580	55	Did not advance	

Mixed

Athlete	Event	Qualification		Final	
Athlete	Event	Points	Rank	Points	Rank
Rodney Tudor-Cole	Trap	125	49	Did not advance	

== Swimming ==
Men

Athlete	Event	Heats		Final A/B	
Athlete	Event	Time	Rank	Time	Rank
Brett Halford	100 metre backstroke	1:02.95	44	Did not advance	
Brett Halford	200 metre backstroke	2:17.84	37	Did not advance	
Vaughan Smith	50 metre freestyle	25.29	52	Did not advance	
Vaughan Smith	100 metre freestyle	53.58	46	Did not advance	
Vaughan Smith	200 metre freestyle	1:56.13	42	Did not advance	
Vaughan Smith	200 metre individual medley	2:18.07	50	Did not advance	
Graham Thompson	50 metre freestyle	25.38	53	Did not advance	
Graham Thompson	100 metre freestyle	55.20	60	Did not advance	
Graham Thompson	100 metre butterfly	1:00.13	43	Did not advance	
Graham Thompson	200 metre individual medley	2:17.06	47	Did not advance	

Women

Athlete	Event	Heats		Final A/B	
Athlete	Event	Time	Rank	Time	Rank
Catherine Fogarty	50 metre freestyle	28.66	40	Did not advance	
Catherine Fogarty	100 metre freestyle	1:02.47	49	Did not advance	
Catherine Fogarty	200 metre freestyle	2:13.44	41	Did not advance	

== Tennis ==
Men

Athlete	Event	Round of 64	Round of 32	Round of 16	Quarterfinals	Semifinals	Final	
Athlete	Event	Opposition Result	Opposition Result	Opposition Result	Opposition Result	Opposition Result	Opposition Result	Rank
Mark Gurr	Singles	Casal (ESP); L 2–6, 3–6, 1–6	Did not advance					
Philip Tuckniss; Mark Gurr	Doubles	—N/a	Caballero / Chapacú (PAR); W 4–6, 6–3, 6–3, 6–1	Edberg / Järryd (SWE); L 0–6, 1–6, 4–6	Did not advance			

Women

Athlete	Event	Round of 64	Round of 32	Round of 16	Quarterfinals	Semifinals	Final	
Athlete	Event	Opposition Result	Opposition Result	Opposition Result	Opposition Result	Opposition Result	Opposition Result	Rank
Julia Muir	Singles	Bye	Hanika (FRG); L 1–6, 1–6	Did not advance				
