= Witold Majchrzycki =

Polish boxer

Personal information
- Born: 4 February 1909 Berlin, German Empire
- Died: 3 December 1993 (aged 84) Poznań, Poland

Boxing career
Medal record
Men's amateur boxing
Representing Poland
European Amateur Championships
Silver medal – second place	1930 Budapest	Middleweight
Silver medal – second place	1934 Budapest	Middleweight

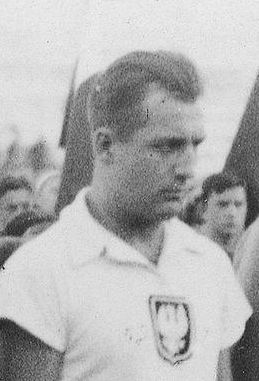
Majchrzycki in 1935

Walter Witold Majchrzycki (4 February 1909 – 3 December 1993) was a Polish boxer who competed in the 1928 Summer Olympics.

He was born in Berlin, German Empire, and died in Poznań.

In 1928 he was eliminated in the second round of the lightweight class after losing his bout to the upcoming silver medalist Stephen Halaiko.
