= Stephen Halaiko =

American boxer

Medal record

Men's boxing

Representing the United States

Olympic Games
| Silver medal – second place | 1928 Amsterdam | Lightweight |

Stephen Michael "Steve" Halaiko (December 27, 1908, in Auburn, New York – February 6, 2001) was an American boxer who competed in the 1928 Summer Olympics.

== Amateur career ==
Because of his baseball skill, Halaiko won a scholarship to Cook Academy at Montour Falls, the oldest prep school in New York State. He organized Cook's first boxing team, serving as coach and captain. Steve made rapid strides with his fists. He won the 1928 national amateur lightweight title, which qualified him for the Olympic Games in Amsterdam that same year. Halaiko won 115 of 116 amateur fights and was the U.S. AAU Champion at 135 lbs in 1928 and 1929.

At the Amsterdam Olympics in 1928, Halaiko won the silver medal in the lightweight class after losing the final against Carlo Orlandi.

=== 1928 Olympic results ===
Below are the results of Stephen Halaiko, an American lightweight boxer who competed in the 1928 Amsterdam Olympics:

- Round of 32: Defeated Tomas Poetsch (Czechoslovakia) on points
- Round of 16: Defeated Witold Majchrzycki (Poland) on points
- Quarterfinal: Defeated Pascual Bonfiglio (Argentina) on points
- Semifinal: Defeated Gunnar Berggren (Sweden) on points
- Final: Lost to Carlo Orlandi (Italy) on points

== Professional career ==
Steve turned pro soon after the Olympics and quickly moved up the ladder with a string of victories. In 1930 he won his first important fight by winning an 8-round decision over former lightweight champion Sammy Mandell. 1933 would be one of his best years in the professional ring. He defeated Cocoa Kid twice, he beat and had a draw with Wesley Ramey and scored a decision over Paris Apice. In 1934 Steve defeated Lou Ambers over 6 rounds in Syracuse and less than 3 weeks later they would battle to a 10-round draw in Providence. During Halaiko’s 13-year career he would break the top 10 rankings many times and fight the greats of his era. Among those greats were, Izzy Janazzo, Pedro Montanez, Tippy Larkin and Tony Canzoneri. His final record was 74-35-11 with 22 KO’s which spanned from 1929 to 1942.

Halaiko died on February 6, 2001, at the age of 92.
