= Zimbabwe at the 2008 Summer Olympics =

- IOC code: ZIM
- NOC: Zimbabwe Olympic Committee
- Website: www.zoc.co.zw

in Beijing
- Competitors: 13 in 6 sports
- Flag bearers: Brian Dzingai (opening); Kirsty Coventry (closing)
- Medals Ranked 38th: Gold 1 Silver 3 Bronze 0 Total 4

Summer Olympics appearances (overview)
- 1928; 1932–1956; 1960; 1964; 1968–1976; 1980; 1984; 1988; 1992; 1996; 2000; 2004; 2008; 2012; 2016; 2020; 2024

Zimbabwe sent a team to compete at the 2008 Summer Olympics in Beijing, China.

Zimbabwe sent thirteen athletes to Beijing, competing in swimming, athletics, tennis, cycling, triathlon, and rowing. Kirsty Coventry, who won gold in swimming at the 2004 Summer Olympics in Athens, was the lone member of the delegation to medal.

== Medalists ==
| Medal | Name | Sport | Event | Date |
|---|---|---|---|---|
| Gold | Kirsty Coventry | Swimming | Women's 200 m backstroke | 16 August |
| Silver | Kirsty Coventry | Swimming | Women's 400 m individual medley | 10 August |
| Silver | Kirsty Coventry | Swimming | Women's 100 m backstroke | 12 August |
| Silver | Kirsty Coventry | Swimming | Women's 200 m individual medley | 13 August |

== Athletics ==
Seven Zimbabweans competed in athletics, with the best finishes being a pair of fourth-places. One came from Brian Dzingai, in the men's 200 metres. Dzingai was the top qualifier in the heats and semifinals, but in the final, he originally placed 6th, before two disqualifications moved him up to 4th. The other came from Ngonidzashe Makusha in the men's long jump. Makusha qualified in 5th, and sat in 2nd place after the first three jumps. He was passed by one opponent on the fourth attempt, and then lost a medal by a single centimetre on the last round of jumps.

Men
Track & road events

| Athlete | Event | Heat | | Quarterfinal | | Semifinal | | Final | |
| Athlete | Event | Result | Rank | Result | Rank | Result | Rank | Result | Rank |
|---|---|---|---|---|---|---|---|---|---|
| Lewis Banda | 400 m | 46.76 | 6 | —N/a | | Did not advance | | | |
| Brian Dzingai | 200 m | 20.25 | 1 Q | 20.23 | 1 Q | 20.17 | 2 Q | 20.22 | 4 |
| Mike Fokoroni | Marathon | —N/a | | | | | | 2:13:17 | 11 |
| Cuthbert Nyasango | 10000 m | —N/a | | | | | | DNF | |
| Young Talkmore Nyongani | 400 m | 45.89 | 6 | —N/a | | Did not advance | | | |

Field events

| Athlete | Event | Qualification | | Final | |
| Athlete | Event | Distance | Position | Distance | Position |
|---|---|---|---|---|---|
| Ngonidzashe Makusha | Long jump | 8.14 | 5 Q | 8.19 | 4 |

Women
Track & road events

| Athlete | Event | Final | |
| Athlete | Event | Result | Rank |
|---|---|---|---|
| Tabitha Tsatsa | Marathon | 2:37:10 | 49 |

Key

- Note–Ranks given for track events are within the athlete's heat only
- Q = Qualified for the next round
- q = Qualified for the next round as a fastest loser or, in field events, by position without achieving the qualifying target
- NR = National record
- N/A = Round not applicable for the event
- Bye = Athlete not required to compete in round

== Cycling ==
=== Mountain biking ===
Antipas Kwari represented Zimbabwe in cycling, and was the last finisher in the men's mountain bike race, a full lap behind the next-to-last finisher.

| Athlete | Event | Time | Rank |
|---|---|---|---|
| Antipas Kwari | Men's cross-country | LAP (6 laps) | 48 |

== Rowing ==
Elana Hill managed to qualify from her opening heat, but finished last in her quarterfinal and her semifinal, ending up in 25th.

Women

| Athlete | Event | Heats | | Quarterfinals | | Semifinals | | Final | |
| Athlete | Event | Time | Rank | Time | Rank | Time | Rank | Time | Rank |
|---|---|---|---|---|---|---|---|---|---|
| Elana Hill | Single sculls | 8:35:53 | 3 QF | 8:20:84 | 6 SC/D | 8:34:27 | 6 FE | 8:09:94 | 25 |

Qualification Legend: FA=Final A (medal); FB=Final B (non-medal); FC=Final C (non-medal); FD=Final D (non-medal); FE=Final E (non-medal); FF=Final F (non-medal); SA/B=Semifinals A/B; SC/D=Semifinals C/D; SE/F=Semifinals E/F; QF=Quarterfinals; R=Repechage

== Swimming ==
Kirsty Coventry managed to improve on her three-medal performance from Athens, repeating her gold medal in the 200-metre backstroke and her silver in the 100-metre backstroke, and adding silver medals in the 200-metre and 400-metre individual medleys. She also set a world record in her 100 backstroke semifinal, which was not broken in the final, and won the 200 backstroke with another world record. Her team-mate Heather Brand did not advance from the heats.

Women

| Athlete | Event | Heat | | Semifinal | | Final | |
| Athlete | Event | Time | Rank | Time | Rank | Time | Rank |
|---|---|---|---|---|---|---|---|
| Heather Brand | 100 m butterfly | 1:01.39 | 42 | Did not advance | | | |
| Kirsty Coventry | 100 m backstroke | 59.00 OR | 1 Q | 58.77 WR | 1 Q | 59.19 | 2nd place, silver medalist(s) |
| Kirsty Coventry | 200 m backstroke | 2:06.76 OR | 1 Q | 2:07.76 | 1 Q | 2:05.24 WR | 1st place, gold medalist(s) |
| Kirsty Coventry | 200 m individual medley | 2:12.18 | 3 Q | 2:09.53 OR | 1 Q | 2:08.59 AF | 2nd place, silver medalist(s) |
| Kirsty Coventry | 400 m individual medley | 4:36:43 | 7 Q | —N/a | | 4:29.89 AF | 2nd place, silver medalist(s) |

== Tennis ==
Cara Black, representing Zimbabwe for the third time in Olympic tennis, lost her only match in straight sets.

| Athlete | Event | Round of 64 | Round of 32 | Round of 16 | Quarterfinals | Semifinals | Final / BM | |
| Athlete | Event | Opposition Score | Opposition Score | Opposition Score | Opposition Score | Opposition Score | Opposition Score | Rank |
|---|---|---|---|---|---|---|---|---|
| Cara Black | Women's singles | Janković (SRB); L 3–6, 3–6 | Did not advance | | | | | |

== Triathlon ==
Chris Felgate ran the triathlon for Zimbabwe. He finished the swim with the main pack, but fell behind in the cycling and running portions.

| Athlete | Event | Swim (1.5 km) | Trans 1 | Bike (40 km) | Trans 2 | Run (10 km) | Total Time | Rank |
|---|---|---|---|---|---|---|---|---|
| Chris Felgate | Men's | 18:21 | 0:28 | 59:00 | 0:33 | 36:09 | 1:54:31.61 | 42 |
