= Franz Dübbers =

German boxer

Medal record

Men's amateur boxing

Representing Germany

European Amateur Championships
Gold medal – first place	1927 Berlin	Featherweight
Silver medal – second place	1925 Stockholm	Bantamweight

Franz Dübbers (8 April 1908 – 24 August 1987) was a German boxer who competed in the 1928 Summer Olympics. He was born in Cologne. In 1924, 1927 and 1928 he was the German Flyweight Champion. In 1925 he was the German Bantamweight Champion and he placed second at the European Championships in Stockholm, Sweden. In 1928 he was eliminated in the second round of the lightweight class in Amsterdam. He defeated Haakon Lind from Norway but then lost his fight to Pascual Bonfiglio from Argentina.
