= Zimbabwe at the 1992 Summer Olympics =

- IOC code: ZIM
- NOC: Zimbabwe Olympic Committee

in Barcelona
- Competitors: 19 (10 men and 9 women) in 6 sports
- Medals: Gold 0 Silver 0 Bronze 0 Total 0

Summer Olympics appearances (overview)
- 1928; 1932–1956; 1960; 1964; 1968–1976; 1980; 1984; 1988; 1992; 1996; 2000; 2004; 2008; 2012; 2016; 2020; 2024

Zimbabwe competed at the 1992 Summer Olympics in Barcelona, Spain.

== Competitors ==
The following is the list of number of competitors in the Games.

Sport	Men	Women	Total
Athletics	6	1	7
Diving	1	1	2
Judo	1	1	2
Rowing	0	2	2
Swimming	2	2	4
Tennis	0	2	2
Total	10	9	19

== Athletics ==
Men
Track and road events

Athlete	Event	Heats		Quarterfinal		Semifinal		Final	
Athlete	Event	Result	Rank	Result	Rank	Result	Rank	Result	Rank
Fabian Muyaba	100 metres	10.84	51	Did not advance					
Melford Homela	800 metres	1:50.50	38	—		Did not advance			
Phillimon Hanneck	1500 metres	3:37.65	8 Q	—		3:38.09	15	Did not advance	
Tendai Chimusasa	5000 metres	13:50.16	28	—				Did not advance	
Tendai Chimusasa	10,000 metres	29:17.26	31	—				Did not advance	
Cephas Matafi	Marathon	—						2:26:17	58

Field events

Athlete	Event	Qualification		Final	
Athlete	Event	Distance	Position	Distance	Position
Ndabazinhle Mdhlongwa	Long jump	6.96	43	Did not advance	
Ndabazinhle Mdhlongwa	Triple jump	15.96	31	Did not advance	

Women
Track and road events

Athlete	Event	Heats		Quarterfinal		Semifinal		Final	
Athlete	Event	Result	Rank	Result	Rank	Result	Rank	Result	Rank
Gaily Dube	100 metres	12.08	42	Did not advance					
Gaily Dube	200 metres	24.15	34	Did not advance					

== Diving ==
Men

Athlete	Event	Qualification		Final	
Athlete	Event	Points	Rank	Points	Rank
Evan Stewart	3 m springboard	345.87	20	Did not advance	

Women

Athlete	Event	Qualification		Final	
Athlete	Event	Points	Rank	Points	Rank
Tracy Cox-Smyth	3 m springboard	277.95	13	Did not advance	

== Judo ==
Men

Athlete	Event	Round of 64	Round of 32	Round of 16	Quarterfinals	Semifinals	Repechage			Final	
Athlete	Event	Round of 64	Round of 32	Round of 16	Quarterfinals	Semifinals	Round 1	Round 2	Round 3	Final	
Athlete	Event	Opposition Result	Opposition Result	Opposition Result	Opposition Result	Opposition Result	Opposition Result	Opposition Result	Opposition Result	Opposition Result	Rank
Patrick Matangi	78 kg	Bye	Paraguassu (BRA); L	Did not advance							

Women

Athlete	Event	Round of 32	Round of 16	Quarterfinals	Semifinals	Repechage			Final	
Athlete	Event	Round of 32	Round of 16	Quarterfinals	Semifinals	Round 1	Round 2	Round 3	Final	
Athlete	Event	Opposition Result	Opposition Result	Opposition Result	Opposition Result	Opposition Result	Opposition Result	Opposition Result	Opposition Result	Rank
Debbie Warren-Jeans	61 kg	Fleury (FRA); L	Did not advance			Beltrán (CUB); L	Did not advance			

== Rowing ==
Women

Athlete	Event	Heats		Repechage		Semifinals		Final	
Athlete	Event	Time	Rank	Time	Rank	Time	Rank	Time	Rank
Margaret Gibson; Susanne Standish-White	Coxless pair	8:24.16	4 R	8:07.93	3 SF	8:04.73	6 FB	7:56.10	12

== Swimming ==
Men

Athlete	Event	Heats		Final A/B	
Athlete	Event	Time	Rank	Time	Rank
Ivor Le Roux	50 metre freestyle	24.32	46	Did not advance	
Ivor Le Roux	100 metre freestyle	52.92	46	Did not advance	
Ivor Le Roux	200 metre freestyle	1:56.17	38	Did not advance	
Rory McGown	50 metre freestyle	24.75	51	Did not advance	
Rory McGown	100 metre freestyle	53.65	54	Did not advance	
Rory McGown	100 metre butterfly	DQ			

Women

Athlete	Event	Heats		Final A/B	
Athlete	Event	Time	Rank	Time	Rank
Storme Moodie	100 metre backstroke	1:07.60	43	Did not advance	
Storme Moodie	200 metre backstroke	2:23.26	39	Did not advance	
Sarah Murphy	100 metre backstroke	1:07.47	42	Did not advance	
Sarah Murphy	200 metre backstroke	2:24.58	40	Did not advance	

== Tennis ==
Women

Athlete	Event	Round of 64	Round of 32	Round of 16	Quarterfinals	Semifinals	Final	
Athlete	Event	Opposition Result	Opposition Result	Opposition Result	Opposition Result	Opposition Result	Opposition Result	Rank
Sally-Anne McDonald; Julia Muir	Doubles	—	de Swardt / Reinach (RSA); L (0–6, 3–6)	Did not advance				

== Sources ==
- Official Olympic Reports
- sports-reference
