= Zimbabwe at the 1996 Summer Olympics =

- IOC code: ZIM
- NOC: Zimbabwe Olympic Committee
- Website: www.zoc.co.zw

in Atlanta
- Competitors: 13 (12 men and 1 woman) in 6 sports
- Flag bearer: Tendai Chimusasa
- Medals: Gold 0 Silver 0 Bronze 0 Total 0

Summer Olympics appearances (overview)
- 1928; 1932–1956; 1960; 1964; 1968–1976; 1980; 1984; 1988; 1992; 1996; 2000; 2004; 2008; 2012; 2016; 2020; 2024

Zimbabwe competed at the 1996 Summer Olympics in Atlanta, United States.

== Competitors ==
The following is the list of number of competitors in the Games.

Sport	Men	Women	Total
Athletics	6	0	6
Boxing	2	–	2
Cycling	1	0	1
Diving	1	0	1
Swimming	0	1	1
Tennis	2	0	2
Total	12	1	13

== Athletics ==
Men—Track and road events

Athletes	Events	Heat Round 1		Heat Round 2		Semifinal		Final	
Athletes	Events	Time	Rank	Time	Rank	Time	Rank	Time	Rank
Tawanda Chiwira	400 metres	45.89	22 Q	45.38	20	did not advance			
Savieri Ngidhi	800 metres	1:46.46	15 q	—		1:46.78	13	did not advance	
Tendai Chimusasa	Marathon	—						2:16:31	13
Ken Harnden	400 metres hurdles	48.54	4 q	—		48.61	12	did not advance	
Julius Masvanise	400 metres hurdles	50.16	37	—		did not advance			
Julius Masvanise; Tawanda Chiwira; Savieri Ngidhi; Ken Harnden	4 x 400 metres relay	3:13.35	28	—		did not advance			

Men—Field events

Athlete	Event	Qualification		Final	
Athlete	Event	Result	Rank	Result	Rank
Ndabazinhle Mdhlongwa	Triple jump	14.47	42	did not advance	

== Boxing ==
Athlete	Event	Round of 32	Round of 16	Quarterfinal	Semifinal	Final
Athlete	Event	Opposition Result	Opposition Result	Opposition Result	Opposition Result	Opposition Result
Arson Mapfumo	Flyweight	Recaido (PHI); L 13-2	Did not advance			
Alexander Kwangwari	Light-middleweight	Simagunsong (INA); L 12-1	Did not advance			

== Cycling ==
Road

Athlete	Event	Time	Rank
Timothy Jones	Road race	did not finish	

== Diving ==
Men

Athlete	Event	Preliminaries		Semifinals		Final	
Athlete	Event	Points	Rank	Points	Rank	Points	Rank
Evan Stewart	3 m springboard	361.53	11 Q	567.96	13	did not advance	

== Swimming ==
Women

Athletes	Events	Heat		Finals	
Athletes	Events	Time	Rank	Time	Rank
Teresa Moodie	50 m freestyle	27.38	43	did not advance	
Teresa Moodie	100 m freestyle	58.59	38	did not advance	
Teresa Moodie	200 m freestyle	2:08.23	40	did not advance	

== Tennis ==
Athlete	Event	Round of 64	Round of 32	Round of 16	Quarterfinals	Semifinals	Final / BM	
Athlete	Event	Opposition Score	Opposition Score	Opposition Score	Opposition Score	Opposition Score	Opposition Score	Rank
Byron Black	Singles	Raoux (FRA); W 6-3 3-6 6-2	Ferreira (RSA); L 2-6 5-7	did not advance				
Wayne Black	Singles	Szymanski (VEN); W 6^{4}-7^{7} 6-4 6-3	Philippoussis (AUS); L 4-6 2-6	did not advance				
Byron Black; Wayne Black	Doubles	—	(South Korea) Lee, Yoon (KOR); W 6-4 6-2	(Germany) Goellner, Prinosil (GER); L 6-4 1-6 5-7	did not advance			
