= Zimbabwe at the 2011 World Aquatics Championships =

- Flag of Zimbabwe
- World Aquatics code: ZIM
- National federation: Zimbabwe Aquatics Union
- Website: www.zimaquatics.co.zw

in Shanghai, China
- Competitors: 3 in 1 sport
- Medals: Gold 0 Silver 0 Bronze 0 Total 0

World Aquatics Championships appearances
- 1973; 1975; 1978; 1982; 1986; 1991; 1994; 1998; 2001; 2003; 2005; 2007; 2009; 2011; 2013; 2015; 2017; 2019; 2022; 2023; 2024; 2025

Zimbabwe competed at the 2011 World Aquatics Championships in Shanghai, China between 16 and 31 July.

== Swimming ==
Zimbabwe qualified 3 swimmers.

Men

Athlete	Event	Heats		Semifinals		Final	
Athlete	Event	Time	Rank	Time	Rank	Time	Rank
Timothy Ferris	Men's 100 m breaststroke	1:04.76	63	did not advance			
Timothy Ferris	Men's 200 m breaststroke	2:23.96	48	did not advance			

Women

Athlete	Event	Heats		Semifinals		Final	
Athlete	Event	Time	Rank	Time	Rank	Time	Rank
Kirsty Coventry	Women's 200 m backstroke	2:09.03	7 Q	2:09.33	12	did not advance	
Kirsty Coventry	Women's 200 m individual medley	2:13.32	11 Q	2:12.21	9	did not advance	
Kirsty Coventry	Women's 400 m individual medley	4:42.52	14	—N/a		did not advance	
Nicole Horn	Women's 50 m freestyle	27.01	38	did not advance			
Nicole Horn	Women's 100 m freestyle	57.70	42	did not advance			
