= Stella Boumi =

Greek swimmer (born 1988)

Personal information
- Full name: Stella Boumi
- National team: Greece
- Born: 31 March 1988 (age 38) Marousi, Athens, Greece
- Height: 1.72 m (5 ft 8 in)
- Weight: 58 kg (128 lb)

Sport
- Sport: Swimming
- Strokes: Backstroke
- Club: Olympiakos Athina

Stella Boumi (Greek: Στέλλα Μπούμη; born March 31, 1988) is a Greek former swimmer, who specialized in backstroke events. She represented her nation Greece at the 2008 Summer Olympics, and also swam for Olympiacos in Athens.

Boumi competed as part of the Greek swimming squad in the women's 200 m backstroke at the 2008 Summer Olympics in Beijing. Three months before the Games, she cleared a FINA B-standard in 2:14.03 to earn a place on the Olympic team at the Akropolis Grand Prix in Athens. Boumi posted a 2:14.73 to finish heat two in fifth place and twenty-ninth overall on the evening prelims, failing to advance to the semifinals.
