= Roberto Sanz =

Spanish boxer

Personal information
- Nationality: Spanish
- Born: 11 May 1908; Ontinyent, Spain

Sport
- Sport: Boxing

Roberto Sanz (born 11 May 1908, date of death unknown) was a Spanish boxer. He competed in the men's lightweight event at the 1928 Summer Olympics. At the 1928 Summer Olympics, he lost to Carlo Orlandi of Italy.
