= William O'Shea (boxer) =

Irish boxer

Personal information
- Nationality: Irish
- Born: 6 August 1906 Tullamore, Ireland
- Died: 11 March 1997 (aged 90) Tranent, East Lothian, Scotland

Sport
- Sport: Boxing

William O'Shea (6 August 1906 – 11 March 1997) was an Irish boxer. He competed in the men's lightweight event at the 1928 Summer Olympics.
