= Tomáš Pötsch =

Czechoslovak boxer

Personal information
- Nationality: Czechoslovak
- Born: 2 July 1909

Sport
- Sport: Boxing

Tomáš Pötsch (born 2 July 1909, date of death unknown) was a Czechoslovak boxer. He competed in the men's lightweight event at the 1928 Summer Olympics.
