= Boxing at the 1928 Summer Olympics – Lightweight =

Boxing competitions

Men's lightweight boxing at the Games of the IX Olympiad
- Venue: Krachtsportgebouw
- Date: August 7–11, 1928
- Competitors: 24 from 24 nations

Medalists
1st place, gold medalist(s)		Carlo Orlandi	Italy
2nd place, silver medalist(s)		Stephen Halaiko	United States
3rd place, bronze medalist(s)		Gunnar Berggren	Sweden

The men's lightweight event was part of the boxing programme at the 1928 Summer Olympics. The weight class was the fourth-lightest contested, and allowed boxers of up to 135 pounds (61.2 kilograms). The competition was held from August 7, 1928 to August 11, 1928.

== Results ==
Round of 32; August 7
Stephen Halaiko (USA)	W
Tomáš Pötsch (TCH)	KO3
Witold Majchrzycki (POL)	PTS
Sándor Szobolevszky (HUN)	L
Pascual Bonfiglio (ARG)	PTS
Valle Resko (FIN)	L
Franz Dübbers (GER)	PTS
Haakon Lind (NOR)	L
Jorge Díaz (CHI)	PTS
William O'Shea (IRL)	L
Georges Carcagne (FRA)	PTS
Kazys Markevičius (LTU)	L
Gunnar Berggren (SWE)	PTS
Pierre Godart (BEL)	L
Robert Smith (RSA)	PTS
Frank Battaglia (CAN)	L

Round of 16; August 8
David Baan (NED)	PTS
Fred Webster (GBR)	L
Hans Jacob Nielsen (DEN)	PTS
Mathias Sancassiani (LUX)	L
Carlo Orlandi (ITA)	PTS
Roberto Sanz (ESP)	L
Cecil Bissett (RHO)	PTS
Carlos Orellana (MEX)	L
Stephen Halaiko (USA)	PTS
Witold Majchrzycki (POL)	L
Pascual Bonfiglio (ARG)	PTS
Franz Dübbers (GER)	L
Jorge Díaz (CHI)	PTS
Georges Carcagne (FRA)	L
Gunnar Berggren (SWE)	PTS
Robert Smith (RSA)	L

Quarterfinals; August 9
David Baan (NED)	L
Hans Jacob Nielsen (DEN)	PTS
Carlo Orlandi (ITA)	W
Cecil Bissett (RHO)	KO1
Stephen Halaiko (USA)	PTS
Pascual Bonfiglio (ARG)	L
Jorge Díaz (CHI)	L
Gunnar Berggren (SWE)	PTS

Semifinals; August 10
Hans Jacob Nielsen (DEN)	L
Carlo Orlandi (ITA)	PTS
Stephen Halaiko (USA)	PTS
Gunnar Berggren (SWE)	L

Final; August 11
Carlo Orlandi (ITA)	PTS
Stephen Halaiko (USA)	L
Bronze medal bout
Gunnar Berggren (SWE)	PTS
Hans Jacob Nielsen (DEN)	L
