= Zimbabwe at the 2012 Summer Olympics =

- IOC code: ZIM
- NOC: Zimbabwe Olympic Committee
- Website: www.zoc.co.zw

in London
- Competitors: 7 in 4 sports
- Flag bearers: Kirsty Coventry (opening); Cuthbert Nyasango (closing)
- Medals: Gold 0 Silver 0 Bronze 0 Total 0

Summer Olympics appearances (overview)
- 1928; 1932–1956; 1960; 1964; 1968–1976; 1980; 1984; 1988; 1992; 1996; 2000; 2004; 2008; 2012; 2016; 2020; 2024

Zimbabwe competed at the 2012 Summer Olympics in London, UK from 27 July to 12 August 2012. This was the nation's ninth consecutive appearance at the Olympics, after gaining its independence from the former Rhodesia.

The Zimbabwe Olympic Committee (ZOC) sent the nation's smallest delegation to the Games. A total of seven athletes, four men and three women, competed in four different sports. Swimmer and defending Olympic champion Kirsty Coventry was Zimbabwe's greatest highlight to the Games, and the most successful athlete in Olympic history. She won a total of seven Olympic medals (two gold, four silver, and one bronze) in both backstroke and individual medley events, and broke both an Olympic and a world record. Because of her repeated successes in swimming, Coventry became the nation's first female flag bearer at the opening ceremony. On 11 August 2012, Coventry was elected to the IOC Athletes' Commission, along with three other athletes.

Zimbabwe, however, failed to win a single Olympic medal for the first time since 2000, following Coventry's sixth-place finishes in two of her sporting events. Meanwhile, long-distance runner Cuthbert Nyasango also missed out of the medal standings, after finishing seventh in the men's marathon.

== Athletics ==
Zimbabwean athletes achieved qualifying standards in the following athletics events (up to a maximum of 3 athletes in each event at the 'A' Standard, and 1 at the 'B' Standard):

Key

- Note – Ranks given for track events are within the athlete's heat only
- Q = Qualified for the next round
- q = Qualified for the next round as a fastest loser or, in field events, by position without achieving the qualifying target
- NR = National record
- N/A = Round not applicable for the event
- Bye = Athlete not required to compete in round

Men

Athlete	Event	Final	
Athlete	Event	Result	Rank
Wirimai Juwawo	Marathon	2:14:09	15
Cuthbert Nyasango	Marathon	2:12:08	7

Women

Athlete	Event	Final	
Athlete	Event	Result	Rank
Sharon Tavengwa	Marathon	DNF	

== Rowing ==
Zimbabwe qualified two boats.

Men

Athlete	Event	Heats		Repechage		Quarterfinals		Semifinals		Final	
Athlete	Event	Time	Rank	Time	Rank	Time	Rank	Time	Rank	Time	Rank
James Fraser-Mackenzie	Single sculls	7:16.83	5 R	7:19.85	4 SE/F	Bye		7:33.81	3 FE	7:46.49	30

Women

Athlete	Event	Heats		Repechage		Quarterfinals		Semifinals		Final	
Athlete	Event	Time	Rank	Time	Rank	Time	Rank	Time	Rank	Time	Rank
Micheen Thornycroft	Single sculls	7:47.10	3 Q	Bye		7:56.66	4 SC/D	7:51.02	1 FC	8:07.52	14

Qualification Legend: FA=Final A (medal); FB=Final B (non-medal); FC=Final C (non-medal); FD=Final D (non-medal); FE=Final E (non-medal); FF=Final F (non-medal); SA/B=Semifinals A/B; SC/D=Semifinals C/D; SE/F=Semifinals E/F; Q=Quarterfinals; R=Repechage

== Swimming ==
Zimbabwean swimmers achieved qualifying standards in the following events (up to a maximum of 2 swimmers in each event at the Olympic Qualifying Time (OQT), and potentially 1 at the Olympic Selection Time (OST)):

Women

Athlete	Event	Heat		Semifinal		Final	
Athlete	Event	Time	Rank	Time	Rank	Time	Rank
Kirsty Coventry	100 m backstroke	1:00.24	15 Q	1:00.39	14	Did not advance	
Kirsty Coventry	200 m backstroke	2:08.14	3 Q	2:08.32	6 Q	2:08.18	6
Kirsty Coventry	200 m individual medley	2:10.51	2 Q	2:10.93	8 Q	2:11.13	6

== Triathlon ==
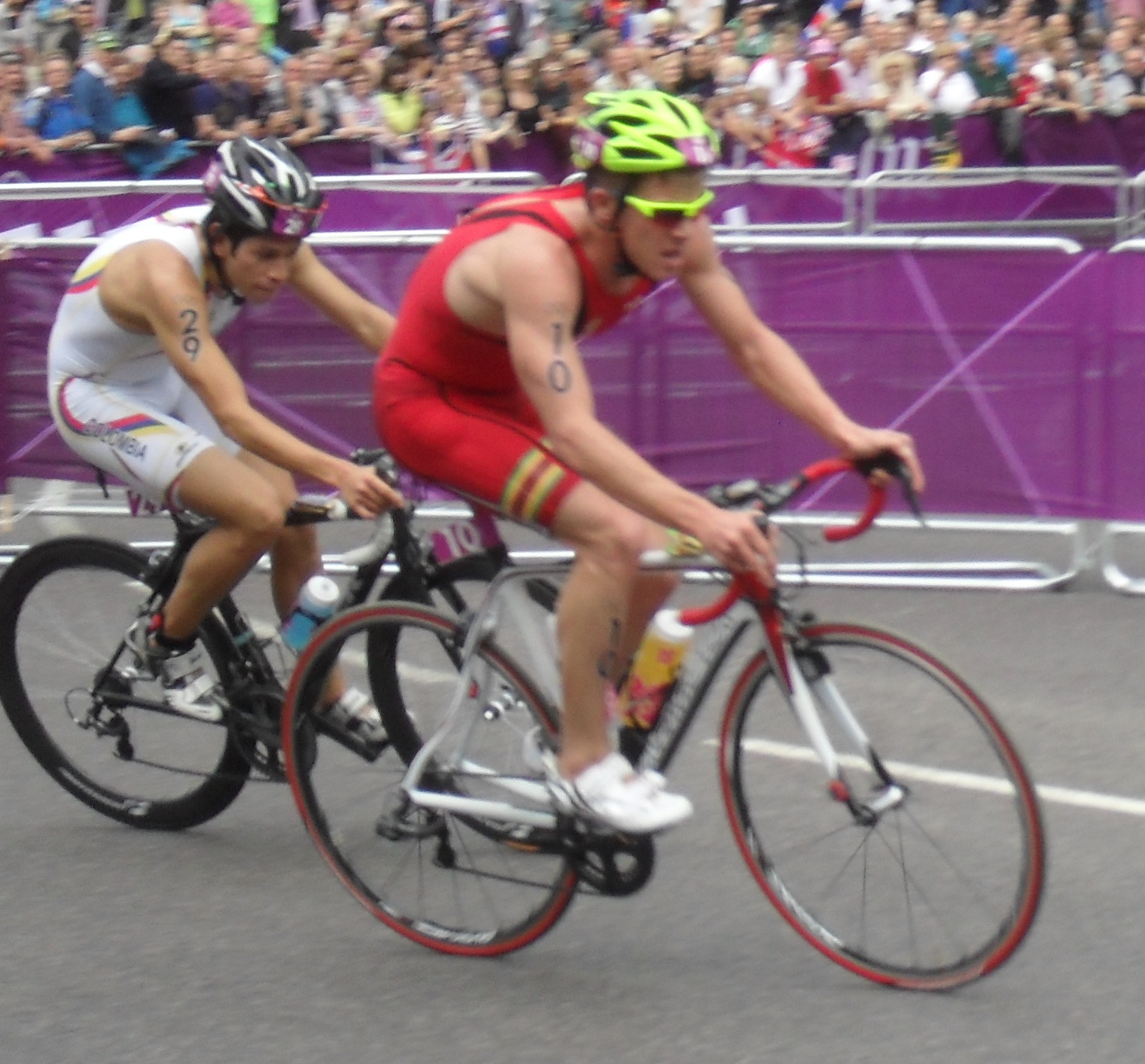
Christopher Felgate, in red, during the triathlon.

Zimbabwe has qualified the following athletes.

Athlete	Event	Swim (1.5 km)	Trans 1	Bike (40 km)	Trans 2	Run (10 km)	Total Time	Rank
Chris Felgate	Men's	18:09	0:43	59:36	0:34	34:51	1:53:53	52
