= Jorge Díaz (boxer) =

Chilean boxer

Personal information
- Nationality: Chilean

Sport
- Sport: Boxing

Jorge Díaz was a Chilean boxer. He competed in the men's lightweight event at the 1928 Summer Olympics.
