= Zimbabwe at the 2000 Summer Olympics =

- IOC code: ZIM
- NOC: Zimbabwe Olympic Committee
- Website: www.zoc.co.zw

in Sydney
- Competitors: 16 (11 men and 5 women) in 5 sports
- Flag bearer: Phillip Mukomana
- Medals: Gold 0 Silver 0 Bronze 0 Total 0

Summer Olympics appearances (overview)
- 1928; 1932–1956; 1960; 1964; 1968–1976; 1980; 1984; 1988; 1992; 1996; 2000; 2004; 2008; 2012; 2016; 2020; 2024

Zimbabwe was represented at the 2000 Summer Olympics in Sydney, New South Wales, Australia by the Zimbabwe Olympic Committee.

In total, 16 athletes including 11 men and five women represented Zimbabwe in five different sports including athletics, diving, swimming, tennis and triathlon.

== Competitors ==
In total, 16 athletes represented Zimbabwe at the 2000 Summer Olympics in Sydney, New South Wales, Australia across five different sports.

Sport	Men	Women	Total
Athletics	6	2	8
Diving	1	0	1
Swimming	1	2	3
Tennis	2	1	3
Triathlon	1	0	1
Total	11	5	16

== Athletics ==
In total, eight Zimbabwean athletes participated in the athletics events – Tendai Chimusasa, Tawanda Chiwira, Iain Harnden, Kenneth Harnden, Samukeliso Moyo, Philip Mukomana, Crispen Mutakanyi and Julia Sakara.

The heats for the men's 400 m took place on 22 September 2000. Chiwira finished fifth in his heat in a time of 46.50 seconds which was ultimately not fast enough to qualify for the quarter-finals. Mukomana finished seventh in his heat in a time of 47.11 seconds. He did not advance to the quarter-finals.

The heats for the women's 5,000 m also took place on 22 September 2000. Moyo finished 12th in her heat in a time of 15 minutes 47.76 seconds. She did not advance to the final.

The heats for the men's 800 m took place on 23 September 2000. Mutakanyi finished fourth in his heat in a time of one minute 47.66 seconds. He did not advance to the semi-finals.

The heats for the men's 400 m hurdles took place on 24 September 2000. Kenneth Harnden finished fourth in his heat in a time of 51.83 which was ultimately not fast enough to qualify for the semi-finals. Iain Harnden finished seventh in his heat in a time of 54.01. He did not advance to the semi-finals.

The heats for the men's 4 x 400 m took place on 27 September 2000. Zimbabwe finished third in their heat in a time of three minutes 5.6 which was ultimately not fast enough to qualify for the semi-finals. Iain Harnden finished seventh in his heat in a time of 54.01. He did not advance to the semi-finals.

The heats for the women's 1,500 m also took place on 27 September 2000. Sakara finished 12th in her heat in a time of four minutes 21.94 seconds. She did not advance to the semi-finals.

The men's marathon took place on 1 October 2000. Chimusasa completed the course in a time of two hours, 14 minutes and 19 seconds and finished ninth overall.

Athlete	Event	Heat		Quarterfinal		Semifinal		Final	
Athlete	Event	Result	Rank	Result	Rank	Result	Rank	Result	Rank
Tawanda Chiwira	Men's 400 m	46.5	46	did not advance					
Philip Mukomana	Men's 400 m	47.11	60	did not advance					
Tendai Chimusasa	Men's marathon	—						2:14:19	9
Kenneth Harnden	Men's 400 m hurdles	51.83	52	did not advance					
Iain Harnden	Men's 400 m hurdles	54.01	60	did not advance					
Crispen Mutakanyi	Men's 800 m	01:47.7	24	—		did not advance			
Tawanda Chiwira; Kenneth Harnden; Philip Mukomana; Crispen Mutakanyi	Men's 4 × 400 m relay	03:05.60	15	—				did not advance	
Julia Sakara	Women's 1,500 m	04:21.94	35	did not advance					
Samukeliso Moyo	Women's 5,000 m	15:47.76	31	did not advance					

== Diving ==
In total, one Zimbabwean athlete participated in the diving events – Evan Stewart in the men's 3 m springboard.

Qualifying for the men's 3 m springboard took place on 25 September 2000. Stewart scored a total of 313.53 points from his six dives. He did not advance to the final and was ranked 38th overall.

Athlete	Events	Preliminaries		Semifinals		Final	
Athlete	Events	Points	Rank	Points	Rank	Points	Rank
Evan Stewart	3 m springboard	313.53	38	did not advance			

== Swimming ==
In total, three Zimbabwean athletes participated in the swimming events – Kirsty Coventry in the women's 50 m freestyle, the women's 100 m freestyle, women's 100 m backstroke and the women's 200 m individual medley, Mandy Leach in the women's 200 m freestyle and Glen Walshaw in the men's 100 m freestyle and the men's 200 m freestyle.

The heats for the men's 200 m freestyle took place on 17 September 2000. Walshaw finished eighth in his heat in a time of one minute 54.7 seconds which was ultimately not fast enough to advance to the semi-finals.

The heats for the women's 100 m backstroke also took place on 17 September 2000. Coventry finished first in her heat in a time of one minute 3.05 seconds as she advanced to the semi-finals. The semi-finals took place the following day. Coventry finished sixth in her semi-final in a time of one minute 2.04 seconds which was ultimately not fast enough to advance to the final.

The heats for the women's 200 m individual medley took place on 18 September 2000. Coventry finished fifth in her heat in a time of two minutes 17.73 seconds which was ultimately not fast enough to advance to the semi-finals.

The heats for the women's 200 m freestyle also took place on 18 September 2000. Leach finished fifth in her heat in a time of two minutes 1.05 seconds as she advanced to the semi-finals. The semi-finals took place later the same day. Leach finished eighth in her semi-final in a time of two minutes 0.6 seconds which was ultimately not fast enough to advance to the final.

The heats for the men's 100 m freestyle took place on 19 September 2000. Walshaw finished seventh in his heat in a time of 52.53 seconds which was ultimately not fast enough to advance to the semi-finals.

The heats for the women's 100 m freestyle took place on 20 September 2000. Coventry finished second in her heat in a time of 57.47 seconds which was ultimately not fast enough to advance to the semi-finals.

The heats for the women's 50 m freestyle took place on 22 September 2000. Coventry finished seventh in her heat in a time of 26.58 seconds which was ultimately not fast enough to advance to the semi-finals.

Athlete	Event	Heat		Semifinal		Final	
Athlete	Event	Time	Rank	Time	Rank	Time	Rank
Glen Walshaw	Men's 100 m freestyle	52.53	52	did not advance			
Glen Walshaw	Men's 200 m freestyle	1:54.70 NR	40	did not advance			
Kirsty Coventry	Women's 50 m freestyle	26.58	36	did not advance			
Kirsty Coventry	Women's 100 m freestyle	57.47	28	did not advance			
Kirsty Coventry	Women's 100 m backstroke	01:03.05 NR	16 Q	01:02.54 NR	12	did not advance	
Kirsty Coventry	Women's 200 m individual medley	02:17.73 AF	18	did not advance			
Mandy Leach	Women's 200 m freestyle	02:01.05 NR	14 Q	02:00.60 NR	13	did not advance	

== Tennis ==
In total, three Zimbabwean athletes participated in the tennis events – Cara Black, Wayne Black and Kevin Ullyett.

The first round of the men's singles took place on 19 and 20 September 2000. Ullyett produced an upset after defeating 15th seed Albert Costa of Spain 6–3 3–6 11–9. After winning the first set, Wayne Black lost 5–7 6–1 6–1 to Jiří Vaněk of the Czech Republic. The second round took place on 21 and 22 September. Ullyett lost 6–2 4–6 6–4 to Ivan Ljubičić of Croatia.

The first round of the women's singles took place on 19 and 20 September 2000. Cara Black lost 6–2 3–6 6–3 to Silvia Farina of Italy.

The first round of the men's doubles took place on 20 and 21 September 2000. Wayne Black and Ullyett lost in straight sets, 6–1 6–4, to Tommy Haas and David Prinosil of Germany.

Athlete	Event	Round of 64	Round of 32	Round of 16	Quarterfinals	Semifinals	Final / BM	
Athlete	Event	Opposition Score	Opposition Score	Opposition Score	Opposition Score	Opposition Score	Opposition Score	Rank
Wayne Black	Men's singles	Vaněk (CZE); L 7–5, 1–6, 1–6	did not advance					
Kevin Ullyett	Men's singles	Costa (ESP); W 3–6, 6–3, 11–9	Ljubičić (CRO); L 2–6, 6–4, 4–6	did not advance				
Cara Black	Women's singles	Farina (ITA); L 2–6, 6–3, 3–6	did not advance					
Wayne Black; Kevin Ullyett	Men's doubles	Haas / Prinosil (GER); L 1–6, 4–6	did not advance					

== Triathlon ==
In total, one Zimbabwean athletes participated in the triathlon events – Mark Marabini in the men's competition.

The men's triathlon took place on 17 September 2000. Marabini did not finish.

Athlete	Event	Swimming	Trans 1	Cycling	Trans 2	Running	Total Time	Rank
Mark Marabini	Men's	20:41.39	52	did not finish				
