= Robert Smith (boxer) =

South African boxer

Personal information
- Nationality: South African
- Born: 1908

Sport
- Sport: Boxing

Robert Smith (born 1908, date of death unknown) was a South African boxer. He competed in the men's lightweight event at the 1928 Summer Olympics.
