= Zimbabwe at the 2019 World Aquatics Championships =

- Flag of Zimbabwe
- FINA code: ZIM
- National federation: Zimbabwe Aquatic Union

in Gwangju, South Korea
- Competitors: 4 in 1 sport
- Medals: Gold 0 Silver 0 Bronze 0 Total 0

World Aquatics Championships appearances
- 1973; 1975; 1978; 1982; 1986; 1991; 1994; 1998; 2001; 2003; 2005; 2007; 2009; 2011; 2013; 2015; 2017; 2019; 2022; 2023; 2024

Zimbabwe competed at the 2019 World Aquatics Championships in Gwangju, South Korea from 12 to 28 July.

== Swimming ==
Zimbabwe has entered four swimmers.

Men

Athlete	Event	Heat		Semifinal		Final	
Athlete	Event	Time	Rank	Time	Rank	Time	Rank
Liam Davis	100 m breaststroke	1:05.39	68	did not advance			
Liam Davis	200 m breaststroke	2:20.33	48	did not advance			
Peter Wetzlar	50 m freestyle	22.77	=44	did not advance			
Peter Wetzlar	100 m freestyle	50.50	56	did not advance			

Women

Athlete	Event	Heat		Semifinal		Final	
Athlete	Event	Time	Rank	Time	Rank	Time	Rank
Robyn Lee	100 m backstroke	1:06.96	51	did not advance			
Robyn Lee	100 m butterfly	1:07.63	45	did not advance			
Paige van der Westhuizen	100 m freestyle	1:00.47	67	did not advance			
Paige van der Westhuizen	200 m freestyle	2:11.36	45	did not advance			
