= Pierre Godart =

Belgian boxer

Personal information
- Nationality: Belgian

Sport
- Sport: Boxing

Pierre Godart was a Belgian boxer. He competed in the men's lightweight event at the 1928 Summer Olympics.
