= Wrex Tarr =

Rhodesian comedian (1934-2006)

- Tarr poses in Rhodesian Army camouflage with an FN FAL battle rifle during the 1970s
- Born: 24 June 1934; Southern Rhodesia (now Zimbabwe)
- Died: 6 June 2006 (aged 71); East London, South Africa
- Education: Prince Edward High School
- Known for: Comedian; Entertainer; News presenter Archer
- Spouse(s): Beryl Lancaster (m. 1957–1973) Merrellyn Churchman (m. 1979)
- Children: 3

Wrex Tarr (24 June 1934 – 6 June 2006) was a Rhodesian comedian, news presenter and archer. He was most famous for his records, "Futi Chilapalapa" and "Cream of Chilapalapa".

== Early life ==
Wrex Tarr was the eldest of three children from Thomas and Ann Tarr. Wrex had a brother, Tom, and a sister, Mauveen. Wrex married Beryl Lancaster on 21 September 1957, they divorced in 1973. They had three children; Berenice, Giselle and Darryl. Wrex was educated at Prince Edward High School in Salisbury. He remarried on the 15 October 1979, to Merrellyn Churchman. They did not have any children.

== Working life ==
Tarr was a news reader for the Rhodesian Broadcasting Corporation for a time. He then went on to become a popular comedian, producing several Chilapalapa records. In 1978 Wrex was awarded the President's Medal for Bisley Rifle Shooting. Tarr then went on to compete in the 1988 Olympics representing Zimbabwe in archery along with his second wife, Merry. Wrex Tarr also ran a swimming pool business in Zimbabwe and, later on after relocating to South Africa, was an organiser and contributor to the St. Francis Conservancy Project where he served as a steering committee member.

== Death ==
Wrex Tarr died on the 6 June 2006 in East London, in South Africa, from a heart attack. At the time he was entertaining at the All Cape bowl tournament.

== See also ==
- Zimbabwe at the 1988 Summer Olympics
- Clem Tholet
- Chilapalapa
