= Valle Resko =

Finnish boxer

Personal information
- Born: 3 June 1910 Uusikirkko, Grand Duchy of Finland, Russian Empire
- Died: 2 August 1988 (aged 78) Lahti, Finland

Sport
- Sport: Boxing
- Club: Viipurin Voimailijoita; Viipurin Nyrkkeilijöitä

Valfrid Aleksander Resch (3 June 1910 – 2 August 1988), better known as Valle Resko, was a Finnish boxer. He competed as a lightweight at the 1928 and as a middleweight at the 1948 Summer Olympics, and lost his first bout on both occasions.

Domestically Resko won four championships: in 1927, 1929, 1934 and 1937. He represented clubs Viipurin Voimailijoita and Viipurin Nyrkkeilijöitä, and was a co-founder of the latter one. He also played baseball for Viipurin Pallonlyöjiä and Havin Kiriä, and won a silver medal at the 1933 national championships. Between 1929 and 1937 Resko worked as a boxing coach, and in 1934–1971 as a boxing referee. In this capacity he was present at the 1952, 1960 and 1964 Olympics. He headed the Finnish Boxing Federation in 1957–71, and served as its vice president in 1939–1956. Between 1957 and 1966 he was a member of the International Boxing Association. His son Anssi (1937–2003) was a leading Finnish track motorcyclist.

== 1928 Olympic results ==
Below is the Olympic record of Valle Resko, a Finnish lightweight boxer who competed at the 1928 Amsterdam Olympics:

- Round of 32: lost to Pacual Bonfiglio (Argentina) by decision

== 1948 Olympic results ==
Below is the Olympic record of Valle Resko, a Finnish middleweight boxer who competed at the 1948 London Olympics:

- Round of 32: lost to Laszlo Papp (Hungary) by a second-round knockout
