= Zimbabwe at the 2004 Summer Olympics =

- IOC code: ZIM
- NOC: Zimbabwe Olympic Committee
- Website: www.zoc.co.zw

in Athens
- Competitors: 12 in 4 sports
- Flag bearer: Young Talkmore Nyongani
- Medals Ranked 49th: Gold 1 Silver 1 Bronze 1 Total 3

Summer Olympics appearances (overview)
- 1928; 1932–1956; 1960; 1964; 1968–1976; 1980; 1984; 1988; 1992; 1996; 2000; 2004; 2008; 2012; 2016; 2020; 2024

Zimbabwe competed at the 2004 Summer Olympics in Athens, Greece, from 13 to 29 August 2004. This was the nation's seventh consecutive appearance at the Olympics, after gaining its independence from the former Rhodesia.

The Zimbabwe Olympic Committee (ZOC) sent a total of twelve athletes, nine men and three women, competing only in athletics, shooting, swimming, and tennis. They marched in the middle of the parade of nations as the 53rd nation due to the use of the Greek alphabet, instead of the penultimate position, just before the host nation, as it has usually been placed. Notable athletes featured tennis siblings Cara (women's singles) and Wayne Black (men's doubles), and sprinters Brian Dzingai and Young Talkmore Nyongani, who became the nation's flag bearer in the opening ceremony.

Zimbabwe left Athens with a full set of three Olympic medals for the first time in history since the 1980 Summer Olympics in Moscow. This full set was officially awarded to swimmer Kirsty Coventry, who took home the gold in the 200 m backstroke, silver in the 100 m backstroke, and bronze in the 200 m individual medley.

== Medalists ==
Medal	Name	Sport	Event	Date
Gold	Kirsty Coventry	Swimming	Women's 200 m backstroke	20 August
Silver	Kirsty Coventry	Swimming	Women's 100 m backstroke	16 August
Bronze	Kirsty Coventry	Swimming	Women's 200 m individual medley	17 August

== Athletics ==
Zimbabwean athletes have so far achieved qualifying standards in the following athletics events (up to a maximum of 3 athletes in each event at the 'A' Standard, and 1 at the 'B' Standard).

Men

Athlete	Event	Heat		Quarterfinal		Semifinal		Final	
Athlete	Event	Result	Rank	Result	Rank	Result	Rank	Result	Rank
Lewis Banda	400 m	45.37	2 Q	—N/a		45.23	4	Did not advance	
Abel Chimukoko	Marathon	—N/a						2:22:09	48
Brian Dzingai	200 m	20.72	4 Q	20.87	5	Did not advance			
Young Talkmore Nyongani	400 m	46.03	3	—N/a		Did not advance			
Lloyd Zvasiya	400 m	47.19	6	—N/a		Did not advance			

Women

Athlete	Event	Heat		Quarterfinal		Semifinal		Final	
Athlete	Event	Result	Rank	Result	Rank	Result	Rank	Result	Rank
Winneth Dube	100 m	11.56	6	Did not advance					

Key

- Note–Ranks given for track events are within the athlete's heat only
- Q = Qualified for the next round
- q = Qualified for the next round as a fastest loser or, in field events, by position without achieving the qualifying target
- NR = National record
- N/A = Round not applicable for the event
- Bye = Athlete not required to compete in round

== Shooting ==
Men

Athlete	Event	Qualification		Final	
Athlete	Event	Points	Rank	Points	Rank
Sean Nicholson	Double trap	128	16	Did not advance	

== Swimming ==
Men

Athlete	Event	Heat		Semifinal		Final	
Athlete	Event	Time	Rank	Time	Rank	Time	Rank
Brendan Ashby	100 m backstroke	58.91	39	Did not advance			

Women

Athlete	Event	Heat		Semifinal		Final	
Athlete	Event	Time	Rank	Time	Rank	Time	Rank
Kirsty Coventry	100 m backstroke	1:01.60 AF	4 Q	1:01.21 AF	7 Q	1:00.50 AF	2nd place, silver medalist(s)
Kirsty Coventry	200 m backstroke	2:12.49 AF	3 Q	2:10.04 AF	2 Q	2:09.19 AF	1st place, gold medalist(s)
Kirsty Coventry	200 m individual medley	2:13.33 AF	1 Q	2:13.68	4 Q	2:12.72 AF	3rd place, bronze medalist(s)

== Tennis ==
Athlete	Event	Round of 64	Round of 32	Round of 16	Quarterfinals	Semifinals	Final / BM	
Athlete	Event	Opposition Score	Opposition Score	Opposition Score	Opposition Score	Opposition Score	Opposition Score	Rank
Wayne Black; Kevin Ullyett	Men's doubles	—N/a	Clément / Grosjean (FRA); W 5–7, 6–4, 9–7	Sá / Saretta (BRA); W 6–3, 6–4	Bhupathi / Paes (IND); L 4–6, 4–6	Did not advance		
Cara Black	Women's singles	Pisnik (SLO); W 6–3, 5–7, 6–4	Rubin (USA); L 4–6, 6–3, 3–6	Did not advance				

== See also ==
- Zimbabwe at the 2004 Summer Paralympics
