= Peter Purcell-Gilpin =

Zimbabwean rower

Personal information
- Born: 4 July 1994 (age 31) Harare, Zimbabwe
- Education: University of Birmingham
- Height: 1.93 m (6 ft 4 in)
- Weight: 84 kg (185 lb)

Sport
- Sport: Rowing
- Club: Molesey Boat Club
Medal record
Men's rowing
Representing Zimbabwe
African Championships
Bronze medal – third place	2019 Tunis	Single sculls
African Indoor Championships
Bronze medal – third place	2020 virtual	Open 2000m

Peter Purcell-Gilpin (born 4 July 1994) is a Zimbabwean rower who competed at the 2020 Summer Olympics.

== Early years ==
Purcell-Gilpin was born into a family of farmers in Zimbabwe. He suffered from a muscular condition that left him unable to play sports by the age of 10 because he couldn't control his shaking legs. He was told by doctors that he would likely lose his ability to use them, but his condition soon began to improve.

Purcell-Gilpin started rowing in 2007, and served as captain of the rowing club during his time at St. George's College in Harare. He competed at the 2012 World Rowing Junior Championships held in Bulgaria, where he finished 16th out of 33 competitors in the single sculls event, and was subsequently named the 2013 Junior Sportsperson of the Year.

== Career ==
Purcell-Gilpin competed at the collegiate level while attending the University of Birmingham in England. Together with his partner William White, they became the first pair from the school to ever medal at a British Universities and Colleges Sport (BUCS) event when they won a silver at the 2017 BUCS Regatta. They also won a gold medal in the men’s double scull event at the 2017 European Universities Rowing Championships held in Serbia.

Purcell-Gilpin debuted at the senior international level in 2013. He competed at his first World Championships in 2015, placing 31st overall in the single sculls. With a fourth-place finish at the 2015 African Olympic Qualification Regatta in the men’s single sculls, Purcell-Gilpin qualified Zimbabwe to be represented in this boat class at the 2016 Summer Olympics. However, he lost his seat to Andrew Peebles during the national selection trials and instead served as an alternate while Peebles competed in the Rio Games.

In 2019, Purcell-Gilpin placed second in the single sculls event at the African Olympic Qualification Regatta in Tunisia to secure Zimbabwe's spot at the 2020 Summer Olympics. A few days later he won a bronze medal at the African Championships, also held in Tunisia. The national selection trials, originally scheduled for April 2020, were cancelled due to the COVID-19 pandemic. While in quarantine, he placed second at the inaugural African Indoor Championships in the men's open 2000m race and was able to qualify for the inaugural World Virtual Indoor Championships. In June 2021, Purcell-Gilpin was finally confirmed by the Zimbabwe Olympic Committee as one of the five athletes selected to the delayed Tokyo Olympics – their smallest team in history. He shared flagbearer duties with 17-year-old swimmer Donata Katai.

== Personal life ==
Purcell-Gilpin earned his BSc in geology and physical geography from the University of Birmingham and is currently studying towards his PhD at the same institution. He works as a freelance artist to fund his rowing career, and raised over $7,000 on GoFundMe to cover his training costs ahead of the 2020 Olympics.

Purcell-Gilpin married two-time Olympic rower Micheen Thornycroft in 2019 after years of serving as training partners.

== See also ==
- List of flag bearers for Zimbabwe at the Olympics

Olympic Games
Preceded by Kirsty Coventry	Flag bearer for Zimbabwe; Tokyo 2020 with Donata Katai	Succeeded by Makanakaishe Charamba; Paige van der Westhuizen
