= Kerstin Rybrant =

Swedish diver

Personal information
- Full name: Kerstin Ingegärd Rybrant
- Nationality: Swedish
- Born: 10 February 1945 (age 80); Stockholm, Sweden

Sport
- Sport: Diving

Kerstin Ingegärd Rybrant (born 10 February 1945) is a Swedish diver. She competed in the women's 3 metre springboard event at the 1964 Summer Olympics.

Rybrant represented Stockholms KK.
