= Georges Carcagne =

French boxer

Personal information
- Nationality: French
- Born: 7 January 1908
- Died: 18 July 1990 (aged 82)

Sport
- Sport: Boxing

Georges Carcagne (7 January 1908 – 18 July 1990) was a French boxer. He competed in the men's lightweight event at the 1928 Summer Olympics.
