= Merrellyn Tarr =

Zimbabwean archer (born 1952)

Personal information
- Nationality: Zimbabwean
- Born: 11 April 1952 (age 73)
- Spouse: Wrex Tarr (m. 1978; died 2006)

Sport
- Sport: Archery

Merrellyn Tarr (born 11 April 1952) is a Zimbabwean archer. She competed in the women's individual event at the 1988 Summer Olympics.
