= Lindsay Grant-Stuart =

Zimbabwean diver (born 1947)

Personal information
- Nationality: Zimbabwean
- Born: 28 September 1947 (age 77)

Sport
- Sport: Diving

Lindsay Grant-Stuart (born 28 September 1947) is a Zimbabwean diver. She competed in the women's 3 metre springboard event at the 1964 Summer Olympics.
