= Leonard Hall (boxer) =

Rhodesian boxer

Medal record

Men's Boxing

Representing South Africa

British Empire Games
Gold medal – first place	1930 Hamilton	Welterweight

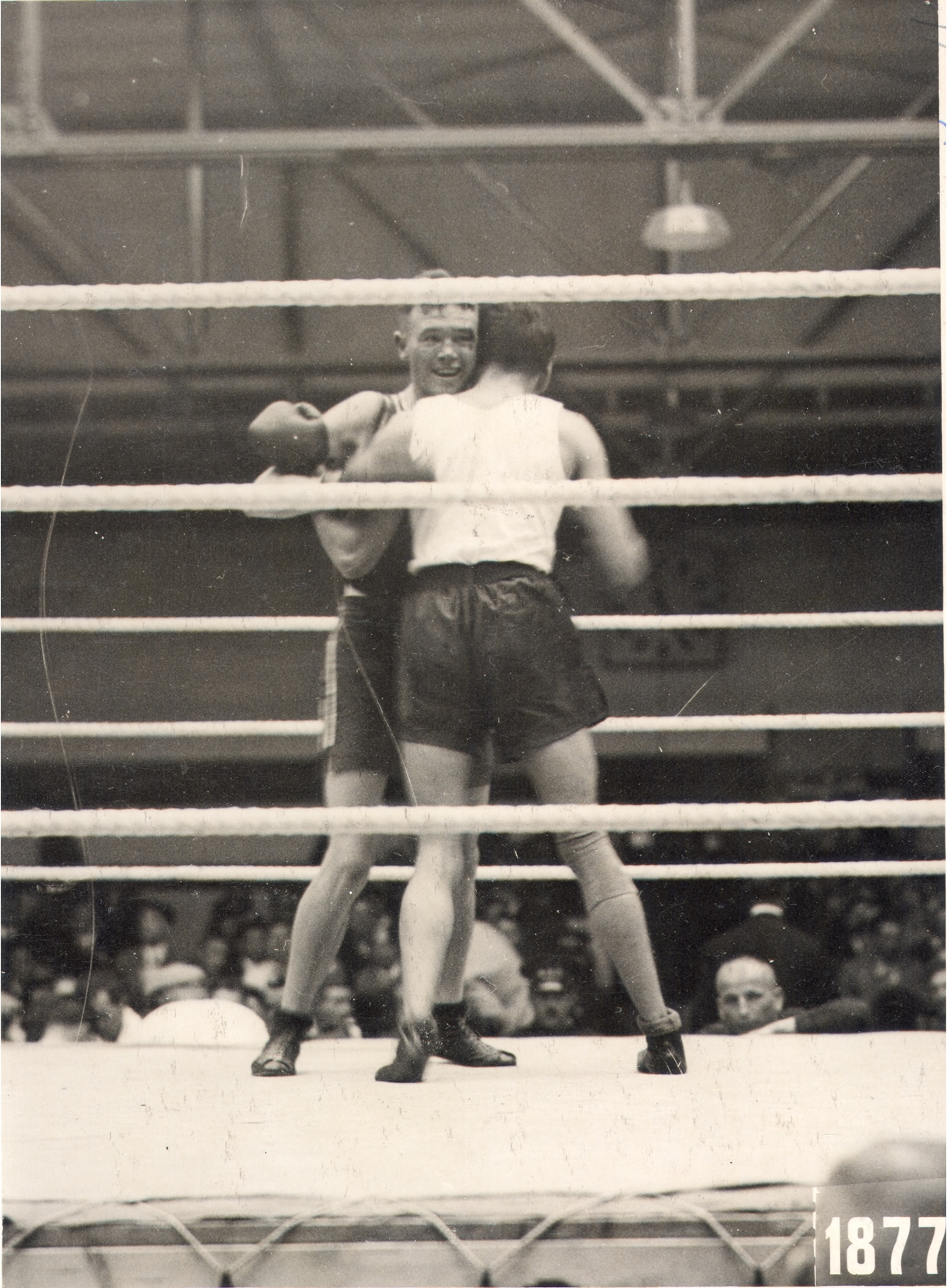
Leonard Hall fighting with William Walther (1928)

Leonard A. Hall (born 20 September 1907, date of death unknown) was a Rhodesian and later South African boxer who competed in the 1928 Summer Olympics. He was born in Johannesburg.

In 1928 while representing Rhodesia, he defeated William Walther of Germany before being eliminated in the second round of the welterweight class after losing his bout to Kintaro Usuda of Japan. At the 1930 Empire Games he represented South Africa and won the gold medal in the welterweight class after winning the final against Howard Williams of Canada.
