= Angelika Hilbert =

German diver (born 1942)

Personal information
- Nationality: German
- Born: 3 December 1942 (age 83) Berlin, Germany

Sport
- Sport: Diving

Angelika Hilbert (born 3 December 1942) is a German diver. She competed at the 1964 Summer Olympics and the 1968 Summer Olympics.
