= Makanakaishe Charamba =

Zimbabwean athlete (born 2001)

- Charamba in 2026

Personal information
- Nationality: Zimbabwe
- Born: 20 December 2001 (age 24)

Sport
- Sport: Athletics
- Event: Sprint
- College team: Auburn Tigers

Achievements and titles
- Personal bests: 100m: 10.15 (Austin, 2023); 200m: 19.88 (College Station, 2026)
Medal record
Men's athletics
Representing Zimbabwe
Diamond League
Third place	2026 Brussels	200m

Makanakaishe Charamba (born 20 December 2001) is a Zimbabwean sprinter. He reached the final of the 200 metres at the 2024 Summer Olympics in Paris.

== Early life ==
From Harare, Zimbabwe he went to high school at Kutama College, where his principal focus was initially on playing rugby and hockey. He later attended Hillcrest College. He was the Confederation of School Sport of Southern Africa (COSSASA) 100m champion in 2018, Manicaland provincial 100m and 200m champion from 2018 to 2020. Makanaka’s father is George Charamba who is the current Press Secretary for the President of Zimbabwe.

== Career ==
At Carson-Newman University, he was named the 2022 SAC Men’s Track & Field Freshman of the Year and the 2022 SAC Outdoor Championship Athlete of the Meet in May 2022. In his freshman year he ran a school record 200 metres time of 20.41 seconds at the NCAA Outdoor Championships and he was named the USTFCCCA Southeast Region Male Track Athlete of the Year. The following year he won the men's 100 metres and 200 metres titles in wind-assisted times of 10.02 and 20.19 seconds at the NCAA Division 2 Championships in Pueblo, Colorado.

He transferred to Auburn University. In May 2024, he met the qualifying standard for the 2024 Paris Olympics after running 20 seconds flat in the 200m final at the Southeastern Conference championship in Florida. Later that month he lowered his 200 metres personal best to 19.95 seconds in Lexington, Kentucky. He finished fifth at the 2024 NCAA Division I Outdoor Track and Field Championships 200 metres in Eugene, Oregon in 20.20 seconds.

He competed in the 200m at the 2024 Paris Olympics, where he reached the final, placing eighth overall.

He finished runner-up at the 2025 NCAA Indoor Championships 200 metres in Virginia Beach, running a time of 20.16 seconds on 15 March 2025.

He set a new personal best for the 200 metres of 19.92 seconds for the 200 metres in the preliminary round of the SEC Championships in May 2025, finishing runner-up in the final to Jordan Anthony. In June 2025, he was also runner-up at the 2025 NCAA Outdoor Championships over 200 metres in Eugene, Oregon running a time of 19.92 seconds to finish behind compatriot and fellow Olympian Tapiwanashe Makarawu. He ran 19.99 seconds to place third at the 2025 Herculis event in Monaco, part of the 2025 Diamond League, behind Olympic champions Noah Lyles and Letsile Tebogo.

In September 2025, he was a semi-finalist in the 200 metres at the 2025 World Championships in Tokyo, Japan.

On 6 June 2026, he won the 200 metres in a personal best 19.88 seconds at the USATF Lone Star Grand Prix in College Station, Texas. On 19 June, he equalled his personal best to run 19.88 and place second to Sinesipho Dambile at the 2026 Doha Diamond League. On 4 July, he ran 20.11 seconds for third in the 200 m at the 2026 Prefontaine Classic. Competing in the Diamond League at the 2026 Athletissima in Lausanne, Switzerland on 21 August 2026, he placed third in the 200 m in 20.14 seconds. At the 2026 Diamond League Final in Brussels on 5 September, he placed third over 200 metres. Later that month, he competed over 200 m at the inaugural World Ultimate Championship in Budapest.

Olympic Games
Preceded by Peter Purcell-Gilpin; Donata Katai	Flag bearer for Zimbabwe; Paris 2024 with Paige van der Westhuizen	Succeeded by Incumbent
