= David Baan =

Dutch boxer

David ("Dave" or "Daaf") Baan (30 June 1908 – 17 July 1984) was a male lightweight boxer from the Netherlands, who, at the age of 19, represented his native country at the 1928 Summer Olympics in Amsterdam.

He was born in Rotterdam, Netherlands and died in Sydney, Australia.

Baan won the first - 'Round 1' - on 7 August 1928 by knockout. Round 2, that took place on 8 August 1928, Baan won by decision against Fredrick Webster of Great Britain. On 9 August 1928, Baan was eliminated in the quarterfinals by knockout while competing against Hans Jacob Nielsen of Denmark.
