= Pascual Bonfiglio =

Argentine boxer

Pascual Bonfiglio (born March 15, 1907, date of death unknown) was an Argentine boxer who competed in the 1928 Summer Olympics.

In 1928 he was eliminated in the quarter-finals of the lightweight class after losing his fight to the upcoming silver medalist Stephen Halaiko.

== 1928 Olympic results ==
Below is the record of Pascual Bonfiglio, a lightweight boxer from Argentina who competed at the 1928 Amsterdam Olympics:

- Round of 32: defeated Valle Resko (Finland) on points
- Round of 16: defeated Franz Dubbers (Germany) on points
- Quarterfinal: lost to Stephen Halaiko (United States) on points
