= Sándor Szobolevszky =

Hungarian boxer

Personal information
- Nationality: Hungarian
- Born: 1907 Budapest, Austria-Hungary
- Died: 4 December 1946 (aged 38–39)

Sport
- Sport: Boxing

Sándor Szobolevszky (1907 – 4 December 1946) was a Hungarian boxer. He competed in the men's lightweight event at the 1928 Summer Olympics.
