= Dennis Hardman =

Zimbabwean sports shooter (born 1943)

Personal information
- Nationality: Zimbabwean
- Born: 9 April 1943 (age 82)

Sport
- Sport: Sports shooting

Dennis Roscoe Hardman (born 9 April 1943) is a Zimbabwean former sports shooter. He competed at the 1980 Summer Olympics and the 1984 Summer Olympics.
