= Zimbabwe at the 2013 World Aquatics Championships =

- Flag of Zimbabwe
- FINA code: ZIM
- National federation: Zimbabwe Aquatics Union
- Website: www.zimaquatics.co.zw

in Barcelona, Spain
- Competitors: 2 in 1 sport
- Medals: Gold 0 Silver 0 Bronze 0 Total 0

World Aquatics Championships appearances
- 1973; 1975; 1978; 1982; 1986; 1991; 1994; 1998; 2001; 2003; 2005; 2007; 2009; 2011; 2013; 2015; 2017; 2019; 2022; 2023; 2024

Zimbabwe competed at the 2013 World Aquatics Championships in Barcelona, Spain between 19 July and 4 August.

== Swimming ==
Zimbabwean swimmers achieved qualifying standards in the following events (up to a maximum of 2 swimmers in each event at the A-standard entry time, and 1 at the B-standard):

Men

Athlete	Event	Heat		Semifinal		Final	
Athlete	Event	Time	Rank	Time	Rank	Time	Rank
Sean Gunn	50 m freestyle	23.25 NR	45	did not advance			
Sean Gunn	100 m freestyle	51.94	47	did not advance			
James Lawson	50 m breaststroke	29.22	51	did not advance			
James Lawson	100 m breaststroke	1:05.12	54	did not advance			
