= Zimbabwe at the 2017 World Aquatics Championships =

- Flag of Zimbabwe
- FINA code: ZIM
- National federation: Zimbabwe Aquatics Union
- Website: www.zimaquatics.co.zw

in Budapest, Hungary
- Competitors: 4 in 1 sport
- Medals: Gold 0 Silver 0 Bronze 0 Total 0

World Aquatics Championships appearances
- 1973; 1975; 1978; 1982; 1986; 1991; 1994; 1998; 2001; 2003; 2005; 2007; 2009; 2011; 2013; 2015; 2017; 2019; 2022; 2023; 2024

Zimbabwe competed at the 2017 World Aquatics Championships in Budapest, Hungary from 14 July to 30 July.

== Swimming ==
Zimbabwe received a Universality invitation from FINA to send a maximum of four swimmers (two men and two women) to the World Championships.

Athlete	Event	Heat		Semifinal		Final	
Athlete	Event	Time	Rank	Time	Rank	Time	Rank
James Lawson	Men's 50 m breaststroke	28.85	47	did not advance			
James Lawson	Men's 100 m breaststroke	1:03.52	51	did not advance			
Peter Wetzlar	Men's 50 m freestyle	23.37	=62	did not advance			
Peter Wetzlar	Men's 100 m freestyle	51.08	59	did not advance			
Devyn Leask	Women's 100 m freestyle	59.08	=50	did not advance			
Devyn Leask	Women's 200 m freestyle	2:08.13	38	did not advance			
Robyn Lee	Women's 100 m backstroke	1:05.05	43	did not advance			
Robyn Lee	Women's 100 m butterfly	1:02.84	36	did not advance			
