= David Felgate =

David Felgate is the name of:

- David Felgate (footballer) (born 1960), former Welsh football goalkeeper
- David Felgate (tennis) (born 1964), former British tennis player and coach
