= Carlos Orellana (boxer) =

Mexican boxer

Personal information
- Born: 1907 Mexico City, Mexico

Sport
- Sport: Boxing

Carlos Orellana (born 1907, date of death unknown) was a Mexican boxer. He competed in the men's lightweight event at the 1928 Summer Olympics. At the 1928 Summer Olympics, he lost to Cecil Bissett of Rhodesia.
