= James Gombedza =

Zimbabwean long-distance runner

Personal information
- Nationality: Zimbabwean
- Born: 11 April 1962 (age 64)

Sport
- Sport: Long-distance running
- Event: Marathon

James Gombedza (born 11 April 1962) is a Zimbabwean long-distance runner. He competed in the men's marathon at the 1988 Summer Olympics.
