= Brian Dzingai =

Zimbabwean Olympic sprinter

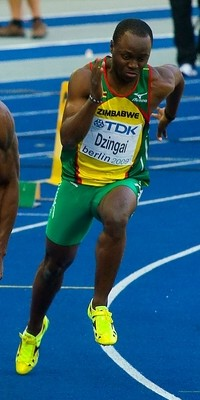
- Dzingai at the 2009 World Championships

Personal information
- Nationality: Zimbabwean
- Born: 29 April 1981 (age 45) Harare, Zimbabwe
- Home town: Chicago, Illinois, U.S.
- Height: 5 ft 6 in (168 cm)
- Weight: 165 lb (75 kg)

Sport
- Sport: Sprinting
- Events: 200 meters, 4x100 Relay, 60 meters
- College team: Florida State Seminoles
- Coached by: Ken Harnden

Achievements and titles
- Personal bests: 100m: 10.19 s 200m: 20.12 s
Medal record
Men's athletics
Representing Zimbabwe
All-Africa Games
Bronze medal – third place	2007 Algiers	4×100 m relay

Brian Dzingai (born 29 April 1981) is a former Zimbabwean Olympic sprinter who specializes in the 200 metres He ran to his personal best time of 20.12 seconds in June 2004 in Austin, Texas. This was the national record for almost two decades.

== Education ==
He is an Old Georgian, and attended St George's College, Harare in Harare, Zimbabwe. He attended college at both Truman State University in Kirksville, MO and Florida State University in the United States, where he was a member of both track teams. He was also a member of the African Students Association at Truman. Shortly after completing his undergraduate degree at FSU, Brian earned a master's degree in Business Administration (MBA) from Florida State University. He also completed a Masters in Intellectual Property Management and Markets (IPMM) from Chicago-Kent College of Law in 2020.

== Career ==
He finished sixth at the 2006 African Championships and won a bronze medal in 4 × 100 m relay at the 2007 All-Africa Games. He also competed at the 2003 World Championships, the 2004 Olympic Games and the 2005 World Championships.

Dzingai represented Zimbabwe at the 2008 Summer Olympics in Beijing where he was selected as the flag-bearer for the Zimbabwean contingent. He competed in the 200 metres and placed first in his first round heat, just in front of Christian Malcolm with a time of 20.25 seconds. He improved his time in the second round to 20.23 seconds and won his race again, this time in front of American sprinter, Walter Dix. He ran his semi final race in 20.17 seconds and placed second after Churandy Martina, but again before Dix. With his appearance in the Olympic 200 meter final, Dzingai became the most accomplished sprinter in Zimbabwean history. In that race, Usain Bolt shattered the world record, and Dzingai ran a time of 20.22, which placed him unofficially in sixth place. However, due to the disqualifications of Martina (second) and Wallace Spearmon (third) he moved up to the fourth place overall, behind Dix and missing out on the bronze medal by 0.24 seconds.

Dzingai was previously Volunteer Assistant track and field coach at Florida State University and Illinois Institute of Technology.

== Achievements ==
- 4th in 200m Final at the Beijing Olympics.
- 5th Round 2, Heat 2 in the 200m at the 2004 Olympic Games.
- 6th in 200m at the 2006 African Championships.
- 6th in 200m at IAAF Final 2008.
- 5th IAAF World Athletics Final 2007.
- 11th in 2007 IAAF World Championships in Athletics.
- 9 (semi-final) 2003 World Championships in Athletics.
- 3rd in 4x100 relay at the 2007 All-Africa Games.

== Personal bests ==
- 100 metres: 10.19
- 200 metres: 20.12

== Philanthropy ==
He is an ambassador for Ndoro Children’s Charity. He is currently working on setting up his own Zimbabwean based charity, the Kushinga Foundation.
