= Cecil Bissett =

Rhodesian boxer

Clyde Cecil Bissett (born 3 April 1907, date of death unknown) was a Rhodesian boxer who competed in the 1928 Summer Olympics. While representing Rhodesia at the Olympics, he defeated Carlos Orellana of Mexico before being eliminated in the quarter-finals of the lightweight class by Carlo Orlandi of Italy. His life after the Games is unknown. Cecil Bissett was an assistant native commissioner at Miami (modern Mwami) in 1949.
