= William Walther =

German boxer

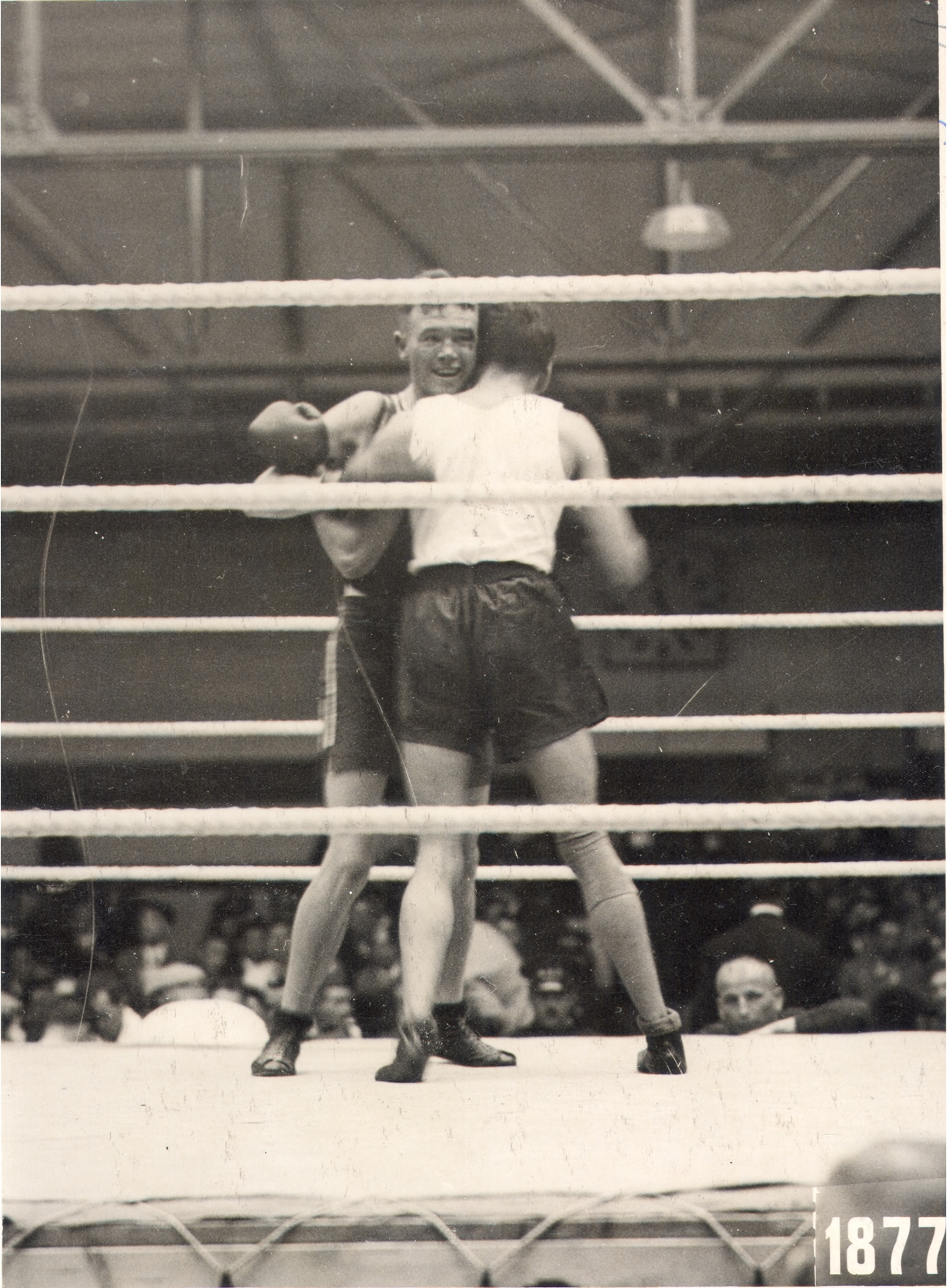
Leonard Hall fighting with William Walther (1928)

William Walther (born 5 February 1906, date of death unknown) was a German boxer who competed in the 1928 Summer Olympics.

In 1928, he was eliminated in the first round of the welterweight class after losing his fight to Leonard Hall of Rhodesia.
