= Lloyd Koch =

South African cricketer (1931–2013)

Personal information
- Full name: Lloyd Bowen Koch
- Born: 17 June 1931; Pietermaritzburg, South Africa
- Died: 16 April 2013 (aged 81); West Byfleet, Surrey, England
- Batting: Right-handed
- Role: Opening batsman

Career statistics
Competition	First-class
Matches	46
Runs scored	2400
Batting average	29.62
100s/50s	2/14
Top score	216*
Balls bowled	100
Wickets	2
Bowling average	43.00
5 wickets in innings	0
10 wickets in match	0
Best bowling	1/8
Catches/stumpings	32/–
- Source: Cricinfo, 28 May 2025

Lloyd Bowen Koch (17 June 1931 – 16 April 2013) was a South African and Rhodesian cricketer and field hockey player.

Koch played first-class cricket for Rhodesia, Natal and Orange Free State between 1948 and 1961. He usually opened the batting. Aged 18, he twice played for a South African XI in first-class matches against the Australians in 1949–50, but with little success. His highest first-class score was 216 not out for Orange Free State against Natal in the 1952–53 Currie Cup.

Koch represented South Africa and Rhodesia at hockey. At the 1964 Summer Olympics he captained the Rhodesian hockey team and was Rhodesia's flag bearer at the opening ceremony.
