= Sarie Bezuidenhout =

Zimbabwean diver (born 1945)

Personal information
- Nationality: Zimbabwean
- Born: 18 February 1945 (age 80)

Sport
- Sport: Diving

Sarah "Sarie" Bezuidenhout-Coltman (born 18 February 1945) is a Zimbabwean diver. She competed in two events at the 1964 Summer Olympics.
