= Carlo Orlandi =

Italian boxer (1910–1983)

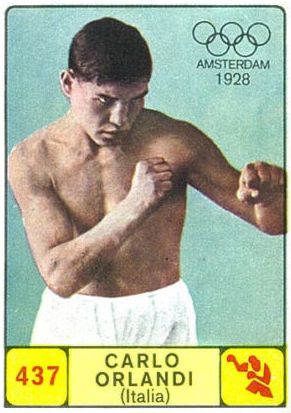

Personal information
- Born: 23 April 1910 Milan, Italy
- Died: 29 July 1983 (aged 73) Milan, Italy
- Weight: Lightweight, welterweight

Boxing career

Boxing record
- Total fights: 127
- Wins: 98
- Win by KO: 12
- Losses: 19
- Draws: 10
Medal record
Representing Italy
Olympic Games
Gold medal – first place	1928 Amsterdam	Lightweight

Carlo Orlandi (23 April 1910 – 29 July 1983) was an Italian boxer who won a gold medal at the 1928 Olympics. In 1929 Orlandi turned professional. During the 1930s Orlandi held both the Italian and European lightweight titles. He then won the Italian welterweight title in 1941 and retired in 1944. Orlandi was deaf.

== Olympic boxing record ==
Here is the Olympic boxing record of Carlo Orlandi, who competed for Italy in the lightweight division of the 1928 Olympic boxing tournament:

- Round of 32: bye
- Round of 16: defeated Roberto Sanz of Spain by decision
- Quarterfinal: defeated Cecil Bissett of Rhodesia by a first-round knockout
- Semifinal: defeated Hans Jacob Nielsen of Denmark by decision
- Final: defeated Stephen Halaiko of the United States by decision (won gold medal)
