= Zephaniah Ncube =

Zimbabwean long-distance runner

Zephaniah Ncube (born 10 January 1957, died before 2007) is a Zimbabwean long-distance runner who competed in the 1980 Summer Olympics and in the 1984 Summer Olympics. Personal Bests: 5000 – 13:24.07 (1984); 10000 – 28:18.2 (1988).
