= Christopher Felgate =

Zimbabwean triathlete (born 1982)

Personal information
- Born: 4 January 1982 (age 44) Harare, Zimbabwe

Sport
- Sport: Triathlon

Christopher James Felgate (born 4 January 1982) is a Zimbabwean triathlete. He competed at the 2008 and 2012 Summer Olympics.
