= Kintaro Usuda =

Japanese boxer

Kintaro Usuda (臼田 金太郎, Usuda Kintarō, September 25, 1906 in Ota-ku, Tokyo, Japan – May 27, 1980) was a Japanese boxer who competed in the 1928 Summer Olympics.

In 1928 he was eliminated in the quarter-finals of the welterweight class after losing his fight to the upcoming bronze medalist Raymond Smillie.
