= Tendai Chimusasa =

Zimbabwean long-distance runner

Tendai Chimusasa (born January 28, 1971, in Nyanga) is a retired Zimbabwean long-distance runner. He carried the flag for his native country at the opening ceremony of the 1996 Summer Olympics in Atlanta, Georgia. He won the Lisbon Half Marathon 1992 and Berlin Half Marathon in 1994 and 1997.

Chimusasa was also a cross country runner and won the Eurocross meeting in Luxembourg in 1994 and 1996.

== Achievements ==
Year	Competition	Venue	Position	Event	Notes
Representing Zimbabwe
1992	Lisbon Half Marathon	Lisbon, Portugal	1st	Half marathon	1:01:17
1994	Commonwealth Games	Victoria, British Columbia, Canada	14th	5000 m	13:59.36
1994	Commonwealth Games	Victoria, British Columbia, Canada	2nd	10,000 m	28:47.72
1996	Olympic Games	Atlanta, United States	13th	Marathon	2:16:31
1998	Hamburg Marathon	Hamburg, Germany	1st	Marathon	2:10:57
2000	Olympic Games	Sydney, Australia	9th	Marathon	2:14:19

- 1998 World Half Marathon Championships - eighth place
- 1996 World Half Marathon Championships - bronze medal
