= Liam Davis (swimmer) =

Zimbabwean swimmer (born 2000)

Personal information
- Nationality: Zimbabwean
- Born: 4 April 2000 (age 26)

Sport
- Sport: Swimming

Liam Raymond Davis (born 4 April 2000) is a Zimbabwean swimmer. He competed in the men's 100 metre breaststroke event at the 2018 FINA World Swimming Championships (25 m), in Hangzhou, China.
