= Paige van der Westhuizen =

Zimbabwean swimmer (born 2003)

Personal information
- Full name: Paige sally van Der westhuizen
- Nationality: Zimbabwean
- Born: 23 April 2003 (age 23) Harare, Zimbabwe

Sport
- Sport: Swimming

Paige van der Westhuizen (born 23 April 2003) is a Zimbabwean swimmer. She represented Zimbabwe at the 2019 World Aquatics Championships in Gwangju, South Korea. She competed in the women's 100 metre freestyle and women's 200 metre freestyle events. She did not advance in either event to compete in the semi-finals.

Olympic Games
Preceded by Peter Purcell-Gilpin; Donata Katai	Flag bearer for Zimbabwe; Paris 2024 with Makanakaishe Charamba	Succeeded by Incumbent
