= Donata Katai =

Zimbabwean swimmer (born 2004)

Personal information
- Born: 7 May 2004 (age 21) Harare, Zimbabwe

Sport
- Sport: Swimming

Donata Andra Sofia Katai (born 7 May 2004) is a Zimbabwean swimmer. She competed in the women's 100 metre backstroke at the 2020 Summer Olympics. Katai was the first black swimmer to represent Zimbabwe at the Olympics.

Born in Harare, she is of Italian and Ndebele descent through her father and Scottish and Shona descent through her mother.

Olympic Games
Preceded by Kirsty Coventry	Flag bearer for Zimbabwe; Tokyo 2020 with Peter Purcell-Gilpin	Succeeded by Makanakaishe Charamba; Paige van der Westhuizen
