= Zimbabwe Olympic Committee =

National Olympic Committee for Zimbabwe

- Country: Zimbabwe
- Code: ZIM
- Created: 1934
- Recognized: 1980
- Continental Association: ANOCA
- Headquarters: Harare, Zimbabwe
- President: Thabani Gonye
- Secretary General: Marlene C. Gadzirayi
- Website: teamzim.org

The Zimbabwe Olympic Committee (IOC code: ZIM) is the National Olympic Committee representing Zimbabwe. It was created in 1934 as the Rhodesia Olympic Committee and recognised by the IOC in 1980.

Zimbabwe made its debut at the 1980 Summer Olympics held in Moscow, Soviet Union. Previously, it competed as Rhodesia and was banned for a short period in the 1970s. After the country gained its independence, it reformed its Olympic committee.

Until 2003, the Zimbabwe Olympic Committee was also a Commonwealth Games Association, which organised Zimbabwe's representation from the 1982 Commonwealth Games in Brisbane, Australia to the 2002 Commonwealth Games in Manchester, England.

== Executive Board of the Committee ==
- Mr Thabani Gonye - President
- Fredreck Ndlovu - First Vice President
- Merit Munzwembiri - Second Vice President

== See also ==
- Zimbabwe at the Olympics
- Zimbabwe at the Commonwealth Games
