= List of conservationists =

This is a list of people who were, are, or have been prominent conservationists. Environmentalists would also work on conservation issues.

== List of conservationists ==
=== A ===
- Joy Adamson (1910-1980) - Austrian-Kenyan naturalist, artist and author. Famous for writing the book, Born Free, an account of her life raising Elsa the Lioness along with her husband, George Adamson.
- George Adamson (1906-1989) - Kenyan Wildlife conservationist and author. Known as "Baba Ya Simba" (Father Of Lions). Known for raising Elsa the Lioness with his wife, Joy Adamson
- Lawrence Anthony (1950-2012) - Wildlife conservationist, environmentalist, explorer and author. Long-standing head of conservation at Thula Thula Private Game Reserve in Zululand, KwaZulu-Natal, South Africa. Wrote the book, The Elephant Whisperer
- Edward Abbey – writer and wilderness activist
- Ansel Adams – wilderness and landscape photographer
- Anthony Ashley-Cooper, 10th Earl of Shaftesbury – former president of Sir David Attenborough's British Butterfly Conservation Society
- Damian Aspinall – chairman of The Aspinall Foundation
- David Attenborough – host of many BBC Natural History documentaries, naturalist, educator

=== B ===
- Jeannie Baker – artist/author of children's picture books and film maker
- Roberto Ballon - Environmental advocate and politician who led local efforts in the Philippines to preserve mangrove forests and promote sustainable fishing practices
- Judi Bari - Labor leader and activist involved in direct action to preserve Northern Californian redwood forests in the 1980s and 1990s.
- Nena Baltazar – President of Comunidad Inti Wara Yassi, a Bolivian nongovernmental organization working in conservation and wildlife care
- S. Theodore Baskaran – wildlife conservationist
- Tom Bell – founder of the Wyoming Outdoor Council and decorated World War II veteran
- Michael Bengwayan - Environmental organization leader who promoted petroleum nut alternative fuel sources and tree protection
- Frances Beinecke – President of the Natural Resources Defense Council
- Bai Bibyaon Ligkayan Bigkay - prominent Lumad leader involved in protecting the Pantaron Mountain Range from destructive logging and preventing ethnocide
- Harvey Broome – wilderness activist
- David Brower – mid-20th century leader of the Sierra Club
- Tom Brown – naturalist
- David Bellamy – botanist and environmental campaigner

=== C ===
- Arthur Carhart – U.S. Forest Service official who inspired wilderness protection in the United States
- Archie Carr – zoology professor and herpetologist, prominent sea turtle conservationist
- Rachel Carson – scientist who advanced the global environmental movement
- Jimmy Carter – signed the Alaska National Interest Lands Conservation Act in 1980, which protected more land than any single piece of legislation ever passed by Congress
- Yvon Chouinard – environmentalist and outdoor industry businessman. Owner of the company Patagonia, known for its environmental focus.
- Frederic Edwin Church – American landscape painter, famous for Twilight in the Wilderness
- Eugenie Clark – conservationist of sharks
- Eugene Cussons ( 1979-2026) - South African primatologist, director of Chimp Eden and host of Animal Planet's Escape to Chimp Eden
- Clem Coetzee – (c. 1939–7 September 2006) Zimbabwean conservationist. He developed new methods of big game conservation.
- Ivan Carter (born 1971) - Zimbabwean Wildlife conservationist, professional safari guide and photographer
- Ernie Cooper – Canadian wildlife trade expert
- Jeff Corwin – Animal Planet host, herpetologist
- Adjany Costa – Angolan marine biologist
- Jacques Cousteau – oceanographer, marine biologist
- Cynthia Mbabazi – advocate, researcher
- Christine Jorgensen - Zoologist, ecologist and marine scientist. Professional speaker and science communicator for the conservation of wildlife and ecosystems in Far North Queensland, Australia. Founder of Wildlife Science Australia.

=== D ===
- Marjory Stoneman Douglas – writer/conservationist who founded Friends of the Everglades
- William O. Douglas – U.S. Supreme Court Justice who was an ardent conservationist. William O. Douglas Wilderness is named after him
- Iain Douglas-Hamilton – founder of Save the Elephants, zoologist
- Gerald Durrell – naturalist, zookeeper, conservationist, writer, television presenter, founder of the Jersey Wildlife Conservation Trust (now Durrell Wildlife Conservation Trust) and the Jersey Zoo (now renamed Durrell Wildlife Park)

=== E ===
- Dwight D. Eisenhower – the Arctic National Wildlife Refuge became a federally protected wilderness area during his administration
- Ralph Waldo Emerson – author, naturalist, wilderness adventurer, activist and development critic

=== F ===
- Dian Fossey – primatologist known for studying gorillas, author, founder of the Digit Fund today known as the Dian Fossey Gorilla Fund International, was murdered presumably by poachers because of her cause
- Tony Fitzjohn (1945-2022), British Wildlife conservationist who worked with George Adamson, raising Lions at Kora National Park in Kenya.
- Bernard Frank – one of the founders of The Wilderness Society

=== G ===
- Jane Goodall – primatologist known for studying chimpanzees, author, founder of the Jane Goodall Institute
- George Bird Grinnell – prominent early American conservationist
- Bernhard Grzimek – renowned German zoo director and animal conservationist in postwar West Germany.
- Madison Grant – American creator of wildlife management and co-founder of Save the Redwoods League

=== H ===
- Maya Higa - American conservationist, falconer, wildlife rehabilitator, Twitch streamer, and YouTuber.
- Hubert Humphrey – U.S. Senator from Minnesota in 1956 who presented the first draft of the Federal Wilderness Preservation System Bill to Congress
- Celia Hunter – former president of The Wilderness Society

=== I ===
- Steve Irwin – Australian zookeeper, documentary film maker and activist

=== K ===
- Greg King - Author, journalist, and environmental activist who led direct action to preserve Northern Californian redwood forests in the 1980s and 1990s

=== L ===
- Lyndon Baines Johnson – signed the Wilderness Act on September 3, 1964, which permanently guaranteed millions of acres of wild land for future generations of Americans
- Aldo Leopold – ecologist, forester and environmentalist; author of A Sand County Almanac
- A. Starker Leopold – son of Aldo Leopold, zoologist and ecologist, writer of the Leopold Report

=== M ===
- Wangari Muta Maathai – Nobel Peace Prize recipient, founder of the Green Belt Movement, political activist
- Benton MacKaye – wilderness activist, founder of the Appalachian Trail
- Bob Marshall – principal founder of The Wilderness Society
- Louis B. Marshall – constitutional lawyer who was instrumental in passing "forever wild" legislation of N.Y.S. Constitution, which permanently protected wilderness in Adirondack and Catskill Forest Preserves
- Nigel Marven – wildlife presenter and producer
- Bill Mason – wilderness author and canoeist
- Stephen Mather – conservationist who was the first director of National Park Service, as a unified federal agency to oversee National Parks administration which he ran publicity campaign to established
- Malcolm McCallum – conservation biologist who publishes on biodiversity and extinction, and established the scholarly journal Herpetological Conservation and Biology.
- Ian McTaggart-Cowan – Canadian zoologist, conservationist and television presenter
- Rodrigo Medellín – Mexican ecologist and academic
- Betty Leslie-Melville – American born writer, who along with her husband Jock Leslie-Melvile, is known for authoring ten books on conservation topics, protecting the Rothschild's giraffe in Kenya, and founding the Giraffe Centre in Lang'ata, Kenya.
- Chico Mendes – Brazilian environmentalist
- Sergio Rossetti Morosini – Brazilian-American environmentalist
- Cynthia Moss – elephant behavioural specialist, ethologist, author
- John Muir – author and preservationist, founder of the Sierra Club
- Margaret Murie – "Grandmother of the conservation movement"
- Olaus Murie – wilderness activist
- Erni Suyanti Musabine, veterinarian involved in the conservation of Sumatran tigers
- Mike Pandey

=== N ===
- Abi Kusno Nachran – Indonesian rain forest preservation activist
- Roderick Nash – author of "Wilderness and the American Mind"
- Lone Drøscher Nielsen – working with Borneo Orangutan Survival for conservation of Bornean orangutans and orangutan habitat
- Henri Nsanjama – Malawian conservationist
- Aletris Neils – carnivore conservationist and executive director of Conservation CATalyst

=== O ===
- Ric O'Barry – former dolphin trainer for the TV show Flipper turned dolphin activist and conservationist, featured in the documentary The Cove
- Ernest Oberholtzer – one of the eight founders of The Wilderness Society
- Sigurd F. Olson – author, environmentalist, teacher, canoeist and advocate in the northern Midwest. Worked to establish Pt. Reyes, Arctic NWR, Boundary Waters Canoe Wilderness

=== P ===
- Deborah Parker – indigenous rights activist, conservationist, and environmentalist who has opposed various pipeline projects and who advocates for protecting coastal waters and salmon among the Northwest Natives
- Gifford Pinchot – conservationist, first Chief of the United States Forest Service
- Sharon Pincott – naturalist, wildlife conservationist, elephant behavioural specialist, author
- Ian Player – international conservationist
- Carl Pope – executive director of the Sierra Club

=== R ===
- Kevin Richardson (zookeeper) (born 1974), South African Wildlife conservationist, YouTube personality and self-taught sanctuary owner who works with Lions, Leopards, Spotted Hyenas and Striped Hyenas
- Alan Rabinowitz – President and CEO of Panthera Corporation, a conservation organization devoted to protecting the world's 36 cat species
- Phil Radford – environmental, clean energy, and democracy leader, director of Greenpeace
- Bradbury Robinson – medical doctor and conservationist who published warnings in the 1940s against the use of DDT in agricultural
- Theodore Roosevelt – set aside 194,000,000 acres (790,000 km^{2}) of federal land for national parks and nature preserves. He was also instrumental in establishing the United States Forest Service

=== S ===
- Daphne Sheldrick (1934-2018) - Kenyan Wildlife conservationist, author and expert in Animal husbandry. Well known for raising Elephants at the Sheldrick Wildlife Trust.
- Peter Scott – (1909–1989) founder of the World Wildlife Fund and Wildfowl & Wetlands Trust and the first conservationist to be knighted (in 1973)
- Charles Alexander Sheldon – the "Father of Denali National Park"
- Willie Smits – working, with Borneo Orangutan Survival for conservation of Bornean orangutans and orangutan habitat
- Michael Soulé – (1936–2020) father of conservation biology; cofounder and first president of the Society for Conservation Biology
- Allan Savory (born 1935) - Zimbabwean ecologist, former soldier, farmer, rancher and former Rhodesian politician
- Austin Stevens – naturalist, herpetologist, wildlife photographer, documentarian, television personality, and author
- Shania Bolen - Zoologist and Ecologist. Facilities manager of the Forever Reef Project. Coral conservation expert.

=== T ===
- Gary Tabor – founder and director of Center for Large Landscape Conservation
- Doug Tompkins and Kristine Tompkins – entrepreneurs turned conservationists; together have protected 2,200,000 acres (8,900 km^{2}) in Chile and Argentina
- Henry David Thoreau – author, naturalist and development critic
- Timothy Treadwell – documentary filmmaker, naturalist and founder of the bear-protection organization "Grizzly People." Killed in a bear attack in Katmai National Park.

=== U ===
- Stewart Udall – United States Secretary of the Interior when the Wilderness Act was signed into law by President Lyndon B. Johnson in 1964

=== V ===
- Lily Venizelos – Greek conservationist
- Marlice van Vuuren – conservationist and broadcaster

=== W ===
- Eric Wikramanayake
- Paul Watson – founder of the Sea Shepherd Conservation Society, a co-founder of Greenpeace, and the star of the television show Whale Wars on Animal Planet that documents his organization's yearly trip to the southern ocean to disrupt the illegal activities of Japanese Whalers/ICR.
- Robert K. Watson – founder and father of LEED Leadership in Energy and Environmental Design
- David B. Wingate – saved the Bermuda petrel, or cahow, from extinction and almost single-handedly returned 15-acre Nonsuch Island, in Bermuda, to its precolonial state
- Grahame Wilson - Wildlife conservationist and former Rhodesian army officer
- E.O. Wilson – Pelligrino University Professor at Harvard University, for introducing the concept of Biophilia and making many other contributions to environmental science

=== Y ===
- Robert Sterling Yard – founding member of The Wilderness Society

=== Z ===
- Howard Zahniser – leader of The Wilderness Society, drafted the Wilderness Act

== See also ==
- List of conservation issues
- Environmentalism
