= Giraffe Manor =

Small hotel in Nairobi, Kenya

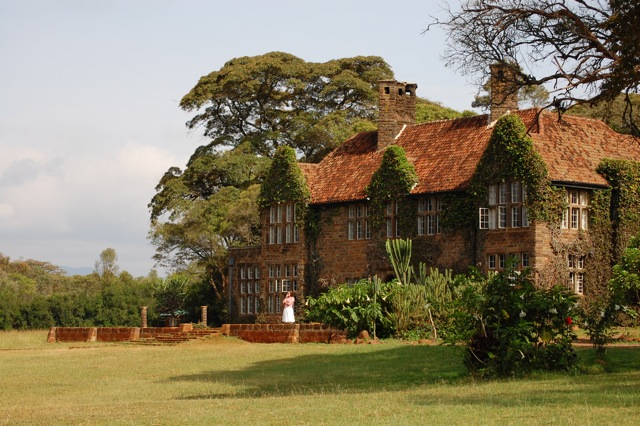
- Giraffe Manor
- Interactive map of the Giraffe Manor area

General information
- Location: Gogo Falls Road, Lang'ata, Nairobi, Kenya
- Coordinates: 1.3756°S 36.7447°E
- Completed: 1932
- Affiliation: The Safari Collection

Design and construction
- Developer: Sir David Duncan
- Known for: Rothschild's giraffes

Other information
- Number of rooms: 12

Giraffe Manor is a small, boutique hotel in the Lang'ata suburb of Nairobi, Kenya which, together with the AFEW Giraffe Centre, serves as a home to a number of endangered Nubian giraffes, and operates a breeding programme to reintroduce breeding pairs back into the wild to secure the future of the subspecies.

== History ==
The Manor was modelled on a Scottish hunting lodge, and was constructed in 1932 by Sir David Duncan, a member of the Mackintosh family, of Mackintosh's Toffee fame, originally sitting on 150 acres (61 ha) of land running down to the Mbagathi River, the southern boundary of the city of Nairobi. In the 1960s, the Manor was purchased by a local investor who leased it to a succession of people, including the late Dennis Lakin, before it fell into disrepair, unoccupied.

In 1974, the Manor was purchased by Betty Leslie-Melville and her husband Jock, along with 15 acres (6.1 ha) of the original 150 acres (0.61 km^{2}). Since then, a further 60 acres (24 ha) of those have also been purchased, which along with an additional 40 acres (16 ha) gifted by Peter Beard which used to form part of his "Hog Ranch" has brought the total acreage of the Manor up to 115 acres (47 ha).

== Life as a giraffe sanctuary ==
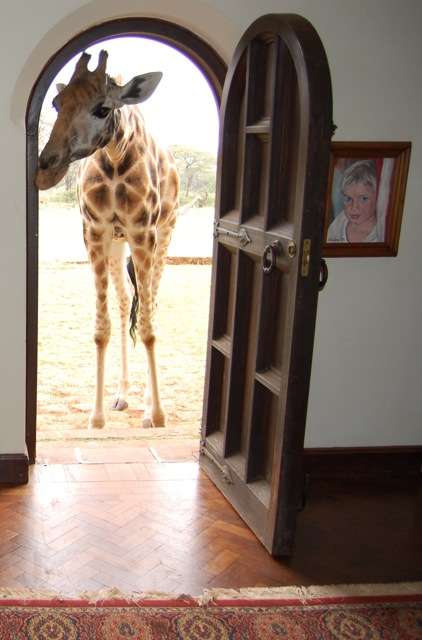
A giraffe poking its head through the front door of Giraffe Manor

Shortly after purchasing the Manor, the Leslie-Melvilles learned that the only remaining Rothschild's giraffes (now subsumed under the name 'Nubian' after being found to be genetically identical) in Kenya were in danger due to the purchase by the Kenyan government of an 18,000-acre (73 km^{2}) privately owned ranch (to resettle squatters, some of them speculated to be descendants of victims of land expulsion by the British colonial government) at Soy, near Eldoret, which was the Rothschilds' sole habitat in Kenya. Inevitably, the government's purchase would result in the land being sub-divided into small holdings.

In 1977, the Kenyan government, through the department of wildlife, relocated some of the Rothschild's to Lake Nakuru National Park which has proven to be a suitable habitat for the endangered sub species.

Since the Manor was already home to three wild bull giraffes (nicknamed Tom, Dick and Harry), the Leslie-Melvilles agreed to rehome one of the giraffes, an 8-foot-tall (2.4 m), 450-pound baby they named Daisy, about whom Betty subsequently wrote the book "Raising Daisy Rothschild", later turned into the film, The Last Giraffe.

Daisy was soon joined by another baby giraffe, Marlon (named after Marlon Brando), and since then the Manor, in conjunction with locations such as Woburn Safari Park in Bedfordshire, England, has run a breeding programme to reintroduce the Rothschild giraffe into the wild to expand the gene pool. Part of the land of the Manor is given over to the Giraffe Centre, run by the African Fund for Endangered Wildlife, a charitable organisation set up by the Leslie Melvilles and Betty's daughter in 1972. By tradition, the giraffes themselves are named after individuals who have contributed significantly (whether financially or otherwise) to the work of AFEW, such as Lynn, named for author and journalist Lynn Sherr, a giraffe devotee who wrote an entire book devoted to the creature.

== Life as a hotel ==
In 1983, Rick Anderson (Betty's son) and his wife moved onto the "Giraffe Manor Hotel" property to take over management of Giraffe Manor as a small, private hotel where guests could feed the giraffe from their breakfast table, through the front door, and out of their 2nd story bedroom window. The Manor has twelve bedrooms, one of which is furnished with the belongings of famous writer Karen Blixen (aka Isak Dinesen).

Over the years, the Manor has welcomed guests such as Ellen DeGeneres, Portia de Rossi, Ellie Goulding, Naomi Watts, Eddie Vedder and Walter Cronkite (after whom one of the Manor's resident warthogs was named), Johnny Carson, Brooke Shields and Richard Chamberlain, as well as hosting Richard Branson, Ewan McGregor and Charley Boorman on the launch of Virgin Atlantic's London–Nairobi service in 2007.

In March 2009, Giraffe Manor was purchased by Mikey and Tanya Carr-Hartley. It's part of The Safari Collection group of lodges and hotels, and includes the Sasaab lodge in Samburu County which pays a rent of $58 per guest per night to the local Samburu people who owns the land. The manor and Sasaab were portrayed in the BBC television documentary series Amazing Hotels: Life Beyond the Lobby. Giraffe Manor is open year-round except for a period from mid-April to mid-May, which is when they schedule repairs and maintenance.
