= Betty Leslie-Melville =

American author and conservationist (1927–2005)

- Born: Betty Julia McDonnell; March 7, 1927; Baltimore, Maryland
- Died: September 23, 2005 (aged 78); Baltimore, Maryland
- Occupations: Writer, wildlife conservationist
- Spouse(s): Lloyd Anderson, (div.); Dan Bruce, (div.); Jock Leslie-Melville, (m. 1963; his death 1984); George Peabody Steele (her death 2005)
- Children: F. M. (Rick) Anderson, Eliza Dancy Bruce Mills, McDonnell Marshall Bruce
- Writing career
- Language: English
- Notable works: Raising Daisy Rothschild, Elephant Have Right of Way, There's a Rhino in the Rose Bed, Mother, That Nairobi Affair, Bagamoyo: Here I Leave My Heart, A Falling Star: A True Story of Romance, The Giraffe Lady, Daisy Rothschild: The Giraffe That Lives with Me (children's edition), Walter Warthog: The Warthog Who Moved in (children's edition)

Betty Leslie-Melville (née McDonnell; March 7, 1927 – September 23, 2005) was an American born author and conservationist.

== Early life ==
Born in Baltimore, Maryland, on March 7, 1927, the daughter of a chiropractor, Leslie-Melville attended Johns Hopkins University.

== Family life ==
Betty married Jock Leslie-Melville in 1964.

She was instrumental in creating sanctuaries to preserve the subspecies of the Rothschild's giraffe in Kenya. Often called the "Giraffe Lady," she spent much of her life living and working in Kenya protecting and caring for the Rothschild's giraffe population there, primarily through a breeding programme established at her residence, Giraffe Manor. During her time working there, the Rothschild's giraffe population grew from about one hundred twenty to over four hundred.

Along with her husband Jock Leslie-Melville and their adopted giraffe Daisy, they were the subject of the film The Last Giraffe (1979) with Susan Anspach playing Betty.

As part of their fund-raising efforts, Betty and Jock Leslie-Melville collaborated on a series of books about animals, most of them characterized by Betty's rather entertaining style. Raising Daisy Rothschild (1977) "the story of two delightful young people and how they raised and grew to love a young giraffe... or two" became a best-seller. Other animal stories and fiction publications include: Elephant Have Right of Way (1973), There's a Rhino in the Rose Bed, Mother (1973), That Nairobi Affair (1975), Bagamoyo: Here I Leave My Heart (1983), A Falling Star: A True Story of Romance (1986), The Giraffe Lady (1997), Daisy Rothschild: The Giraffe That Lives with Me (children's book, 1987), and Walter Warthog (1989), a children's story about the tame warthog they named after their friend Walter Cronkite, the CBS News anchorman. The books helped to raise more funds for the Giraffe Centre that they set up at Lang'ata, Kenya in 1983. She died on September 23, 2005, in Baltimore.
