= List of hotels: Countries K =

This is a list of what are intended to be the notable top hotels by country, five or four star hotels, notable skyscraper landmarks or historic hotels which are covered in multiple reliable publications. It should not be a directory of every hotel in every country:

== Kazakhstan ==
- Hotel Kazakhstan, Almaty

== Kenya ==
- Fairmont The Norfolk Hotel
- Giraffe Manor, Nairobi
- Lake Naivasha Country Club, Lake Naivasha
- Muthaiga Country Club, Nairobi
- Outspan Hotel, Nyeri
- Stanley Hotel, Nairobi
- Treetops Hotel, Aberdare National Park
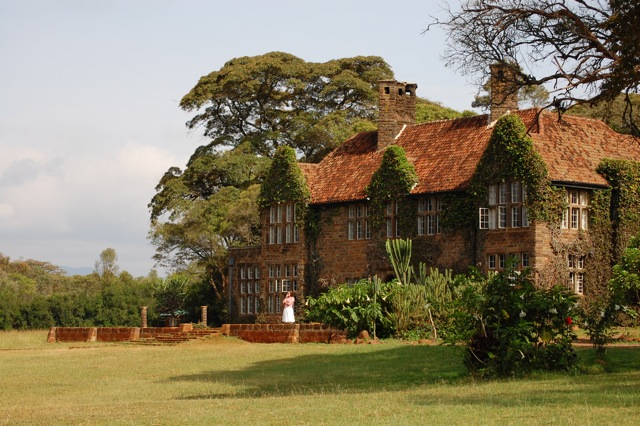
Giraffe Manor

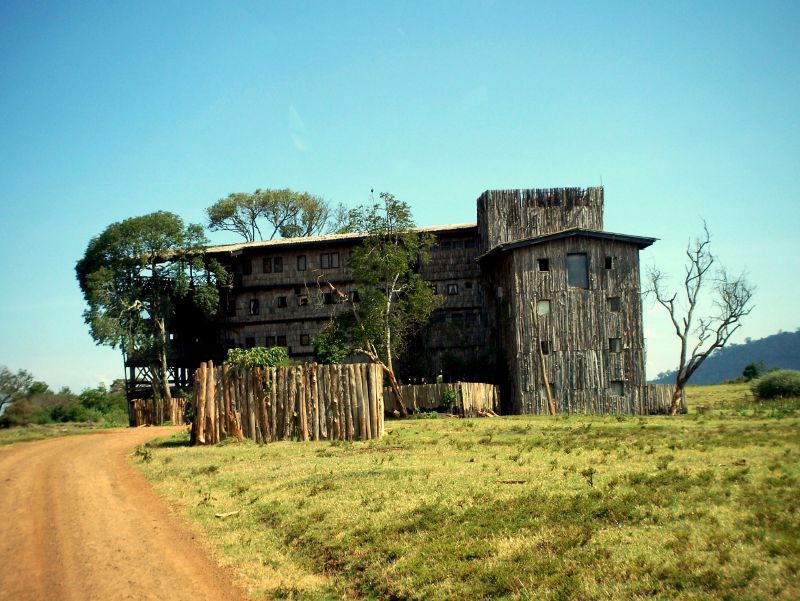
Treetops Hotel

== Kosovo ==
- Grand Hotel Prishtina, Pristina
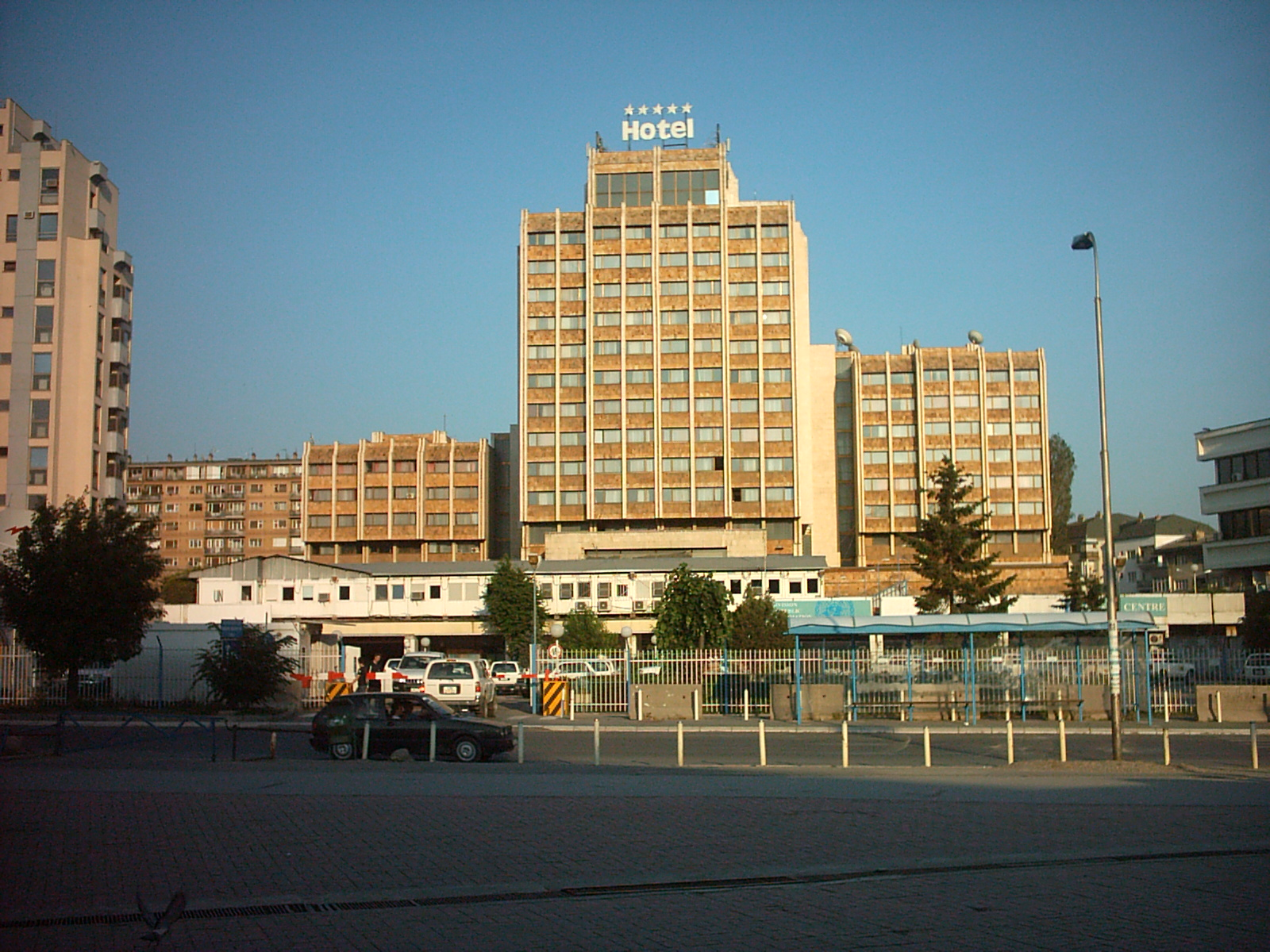
Grand Hotel Prishtina

== Kuwait ==
- InterContinental Kuwait Downtown, Kuwait City
- JW Marriott Kuwait City, Kuwait City
- Rotana Hotels, Kuwait City
- Safir Hotels & Resorts
- SS Santa Paula, Kuwait City
