= NJS =

NJS may refer to

- National Jet Systems, an Australian airline
- Nihon Jitensha Shinkōkai (Japan Keirin Association), now replaced by the JKA Foundation
- Nairobi Japanese School
- 'NaJin Black Sword' a South Korean professional League Of Legends team, sponsored by NaJin Corporation
- Naval Justice School
- New Jersey Southern Railroad
- Nurmijärven Jalkapalloseura, Finnish football club
- New jack swing
- njs, an Nginx webserver module for extending the server's capabilities via JavaScript
