= Nairobi Japanese School =

Japanese-language school in Lang'ata, Nairobi, Kenya

- ナイロビ日本人学校

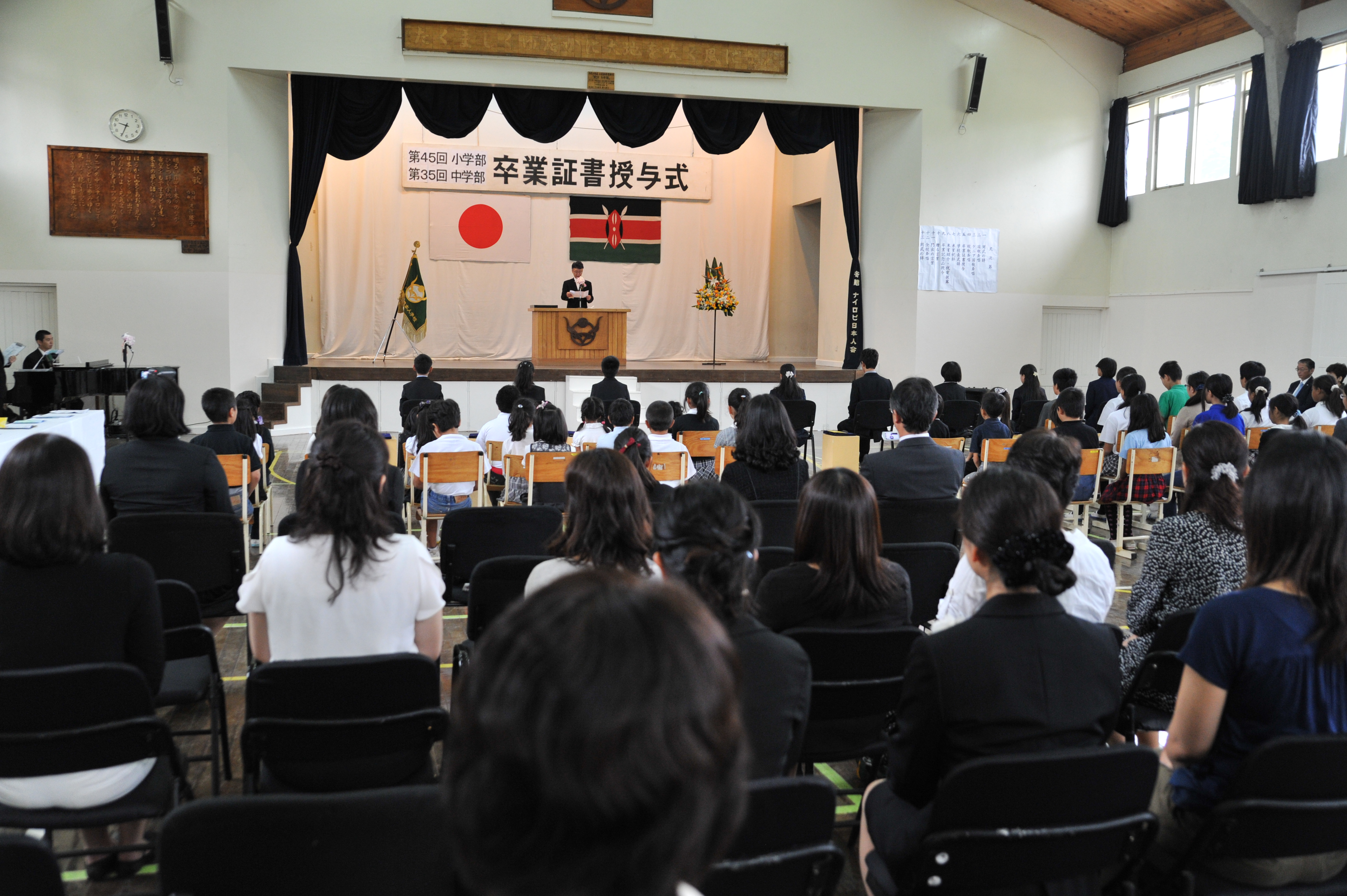
- 2015 (Heisei 27) graduation ceremony

Location
- 00502 Karen Nairobi KENYA; 1°20′08″S 36°45′07″E

Information
- Established: 1970; 56 years ago
- Website: ナイロビ日本人学校.com

The Nairobi Japanese School (ナイロビ日本人学校, Nairobi Nihonjin Gakkō; NJS) is a Japanese school located in the Lang'ata area of Nairobi, Kenya, in proximity to Karen. The school serves Japanese expatriate students.

== History ==
The school was founded on 9 May 1970 (Shōwa 45), with its first campus in Hurlingham. The school had originated from volunteer teaching duties held at the Embassy of Japan in Nairobi that began in 1967. In January 1975 the school received permission to begin its junior high school classes. The first school camp was established in Tsavo Park in September 1976, and the wooden school on Gitanga Road in Lavington opened the following January. The current campus in Langata was completed on 26 June 1981.

On Wednesday August 16, 1995, 56-year-old Kuniaki Asano (浅野 邦章 Asano Kuniaki), the school's principal, died in an apparent robbery attempt, just as he was located at the school's entrance. Two gunmen shot him and stole his car. The shooting occurred during a crime wave in Kenya, which targeted foreigners and occurred in the early 1990s.

== Operations ==
As of 1999 the school gave British English ESL language classes to students twice per week in the levels from primary one through junior high school. As of the same year the school does cultural exchange activities with Kilimani Primary School.

9th grade (third year of junior high school) student Yuko Watanabe (渡辺 優子 Watanabe Yūko) composed the school song's music and lyrics in July 1976. The school designed its school badge in July 1983, and the school flag was designed in October 1984. The school has held an anniversary day beginning in 1983.

== Student body ==
As of 1999 the school had a total of 45 students, among them children of employees of the Embassy of Japan in Nairobi, Japan International Cooperation Agency (JICA), trading companies, and the Japanese school itself. As a result of the overall small size of the school, the class sizes were also small, ranging from two to nine. Some students were born in Kenya and had lived there all their lives, and most students stayed for the durations of their fathers' employment terms of two to three years. Most students lived in the "River Side" housing development.

== See also ==
Cairo Japanese School
