= Chimp Eden =

Animal sanctuary in South Africa

Jane Goodall Institute Chimpanzee Eden
- Interactive map of Jane Goodall Institute Chimpanzee Eden
- 25.57547°S 31.00466°E
- Date opened: 2006
- Location: Barberton, Mpumalanga, South Africa
- Land area: 1,000 ha (2,500 acres)
- No. of animals: 33 chimpanzees
- Website: www.chimpeden.com

The Jane Goodall Institute Chimpanzee Eden, commonly referred to as Chimp Eden, is situated within a 1,000 ha (2,500 acres) game reserve and animal sanctuary for rescued chimpanzees, in the Umhloti Nature Reserve, near Barberton, Mpumalanga, South Africa. Opened in 2006 by founder and director Eugene Cussons, in collaboration with the Jane Goodall Institute (JGI), its purpose is to provide a permanent and safe home for chimpanzees who are rescued from abusive and unfortunate circumstances from areas where these great apes are being constantly exploited by humans through the bushmeat trade, pet trade and entertainment industries. At the sanctuary, the chimpanzees are rehabilitated with the help of their care takers in being re-introduced back into chimpanzee social skills and live in a social group with others of their own kind.

Chimp Eden is the only sanctuary for chimpanzees within South Africa. The rest of the reserve it is home to game animals such as giraffes, zebras etc, which are also managed and conserved by the land owners (JGI rents approximately 23 hectares of the total 1000 hectares). Chimp Eden has rescued chimpanzees from Angola, Sudan, Mozambique, Italy, Central African Republic, Ghana, and Dubai

Chimp Eden is a member of the Pan African Sanctuary Alliance.

== Chimpanzee enclosures ==
=== Juvenile Group 1 ===
This enclosure contains 13 chimpanzees, all rescued individuals. Charles, who was rescued from an entertainment circus in South Africa and arrived in December 2008, was formerly the dominant male in this group. This group contains two adult females, Jessica the dominant female who was rescued from the entertainment circus in South Africa and Martha, who was rescued from being kept in solitary confinement in Ghana. In July 2008, seven babies (Charlene, Marco, Mowgli, Azzie, Bazia, Mary, and Tamu) were rescued from Sudan where they were all victims of the bushmeat trade. The two others are Suzie, who was rescued from the entertainment industry and Lily, who was a victim of the bushmeat trade. As of 2023 this group comprised alpha male and female Tamu and Jessica, Charles, Martha, Suzie, Lily, Marco, Bazia, Mary, Charlene, Mowgli, Azzie, and baby Amari (born 2017).

=== Juvenile Group 2 ===
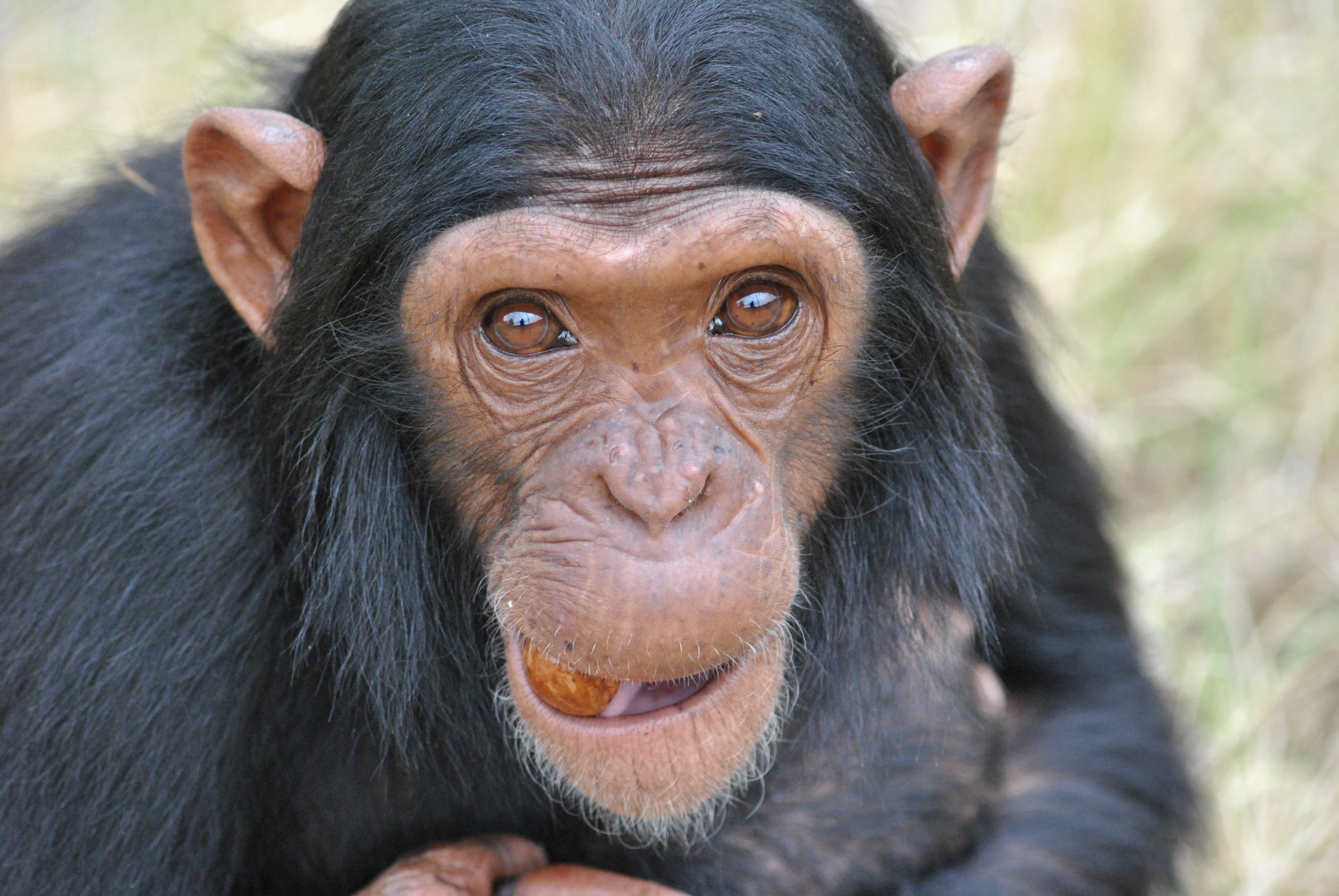
Zee (2010)

This enclosure contains 15 chimpanzees, all rescued individuals except Thabu. Zacarias (Zac), an adult male who was rescued from Angola after being found chained to a tree outside a nightclub in Luanda, was the dominant male in this group before being overthrown by Thomas. Joao is an old male who was kept at a zoo in Mozambique. Other members of the group include Cozy, who was found rescued from Italy where he was kept in solitary confinement and needed rehabilitation into social skills. There were two young females, Zeena, who was rescued from the United Arab Emirates and Sally, who was rescued from Luanda, Angola. In April 2007, five baby chimps (Charlie, Nina, Thomas, Dinka, and Zee) were rescued from Sudan where they were all victims of the bushmeat trade. All settled in remarkably well. Two others, Sampa and Tony, were rescued from Angola where they were being confined to an inhospitable cage. Tony was found to have a cataract in one of his eyes and after a risky operation, he regained sight in his eye. Claudine and Claude were added to the group, but Claude was subsequently transferred to the adult group where he was introduced to both Amadeus and Nicky. In April 2013, Nina and her son, Thabu, were reintegrated after she unintentionally became pregnant and was separated from the group to give birth to Thabu in January 2013. As of 2023 this group comprised alpha female Nina, Sampa, Thomas, Zac, Joao, Cozy, Tony, Sally, Zeena, Zee, Claudine, Dinka, and Thabu. Lika and Claudette have been integrated into this group.

=== Adult enclosure ===
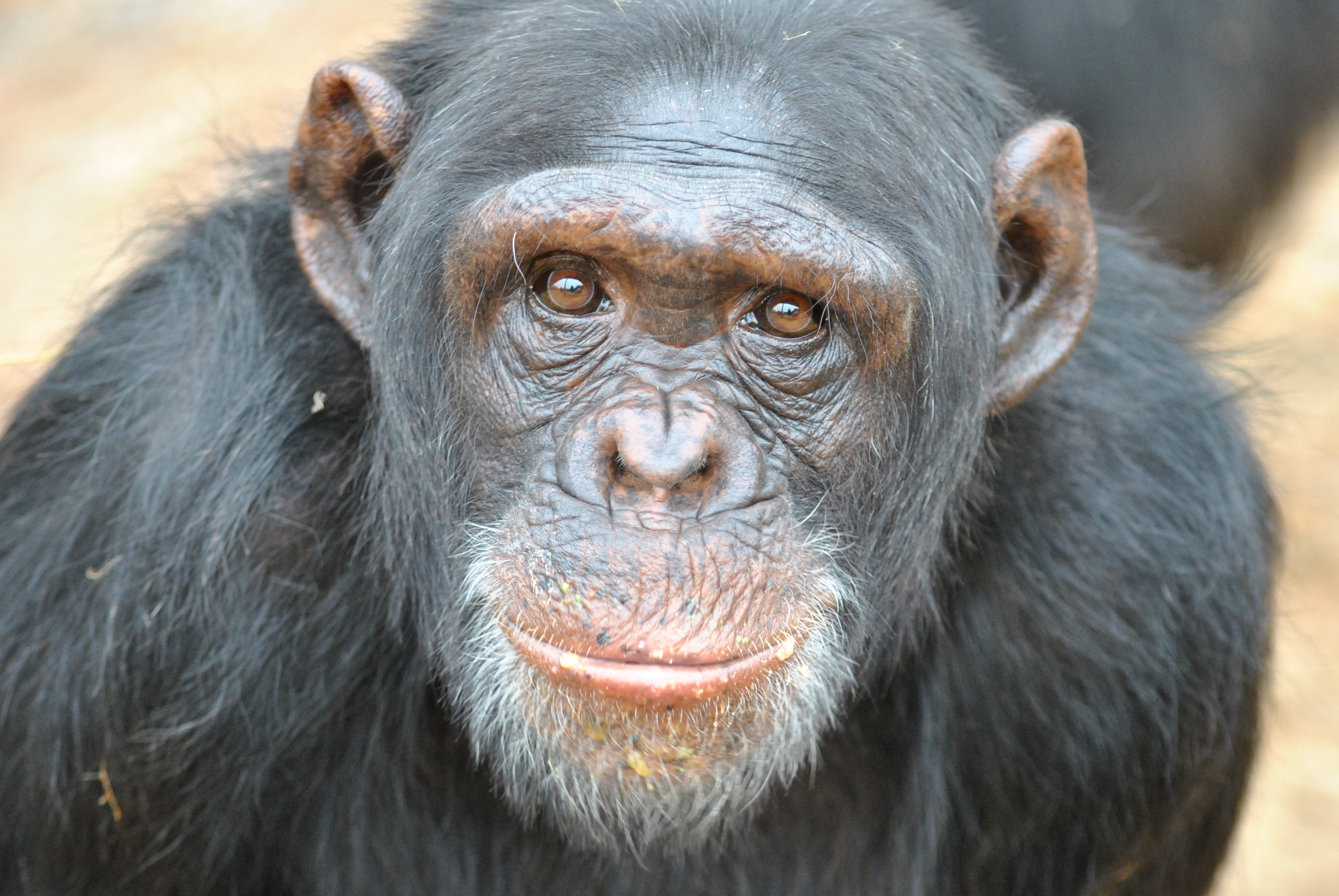
Mimi (2010)

This enclosure contains five chimpanzees, all rescued individuals and is the only group composed entirely of adult chimpanzees. Amadeus, who was relocated to the sanctuary from the Johannesburg Zoo, is the dominant male in this group. Amadeus took over the group after former alpha male Abu, who was relocated to the sanctuary from the Johannesburg Zoo, died. A former member was Nicky, who was rescued from being kept as a human, was the second ranking male and had a tendency to constantly court the females, which usually got him into trouble. The females include Jinga, a female who was rescued from a liquor factory, and Mimi, who was rescued along with Jinga, Lika, who was rescued from a solitary cage in Luanda, Angola, Josephine, who was rescued from a solitary confinement in a shipping container in Luanda, Angola, and Claudette, who was relocated to the sanctuary from the Johannesburg Zoo. Claude was rescued from Central African Republic and originally introduced to juvenile group 1, but was moved to this enclosure and introduced to Amadeus and Nicky. As of 2023 this group comprised alpha male and female Amadeus and Mimi, Claude, Jinga, Josephine, Claudette, and Lika. Lika and Claudette have been moved / integrated into group 2.

== Escape to Chimp Eden ==
The Chimp Eden sanctuary was featured on the 2008-09 Animal Planet television series, Escape to Chimp Eden. The program covers the work at the sanctuary, daring rescue missions carried out by Chimp Eden founder and director, Eugene Cussons and human elements.

== 2012 chimpanzee attack on staff member ==
According to an online news story article written by Rohit Kachroo and other staff from MSNBC World News, and posted on Friday, 29 June 2012: "An American studying chimpanzee behavior in South Africa was "fighting for his life" after he was attacked by two of the chimpanzees, according to a report. ..." The article stated that the student, Andrew F. Oberle, a primatology graduate student researcher and St. Louis area native in the master's degree program in anthropology at the University of Texas at San Antonio who had been acting as a tour guide, had been rescued by paramedics with an armed escort after the park's owner fired shots at and wounded one of the chimpanzees and fired into the air. He was stabilized, and taken to the Nelspruit, South Africa MediClinic Hospital near Johannesburg; as of that weekend he is in critical but stable condition after a six-hour emergency surgery.
