= Henri Nsanjama =

Conservationist

Henri Kapyepye Nsanjama (1952 - July 18, 2000) was a Malawian born conservationist. He was the vice president for and senior adviser on Africa and Madagascar at the World Wildlife Fund (WWF). He is widely known for his efforts to link wildlife with local communities in Africa for conservation. He believed in conservation of wildlife without undue hardship to human beings which was part of his legacy in conservation. He also championed for the US senate to sign the Desertification Convention to ensure that biodiversity was protected in Africa and worldwide.

== Personal ==
He was a graduate of the College of Wildlife Management in Mweka, Tanzania. He received a bachelor's degree in wildlife biology and natural resource management from the University of Massachusetts at Amherst in 1978. He received a master's degree in environmental management from the University of Edinburgh in Scotland in 1985. He was the co-founder of the Malawi Washington Association in Washington, D.C.

He died July 18, 2000, in a car crash.
