= Grand Hotel Prishtina =

Hotel in Pristina, Kosovo

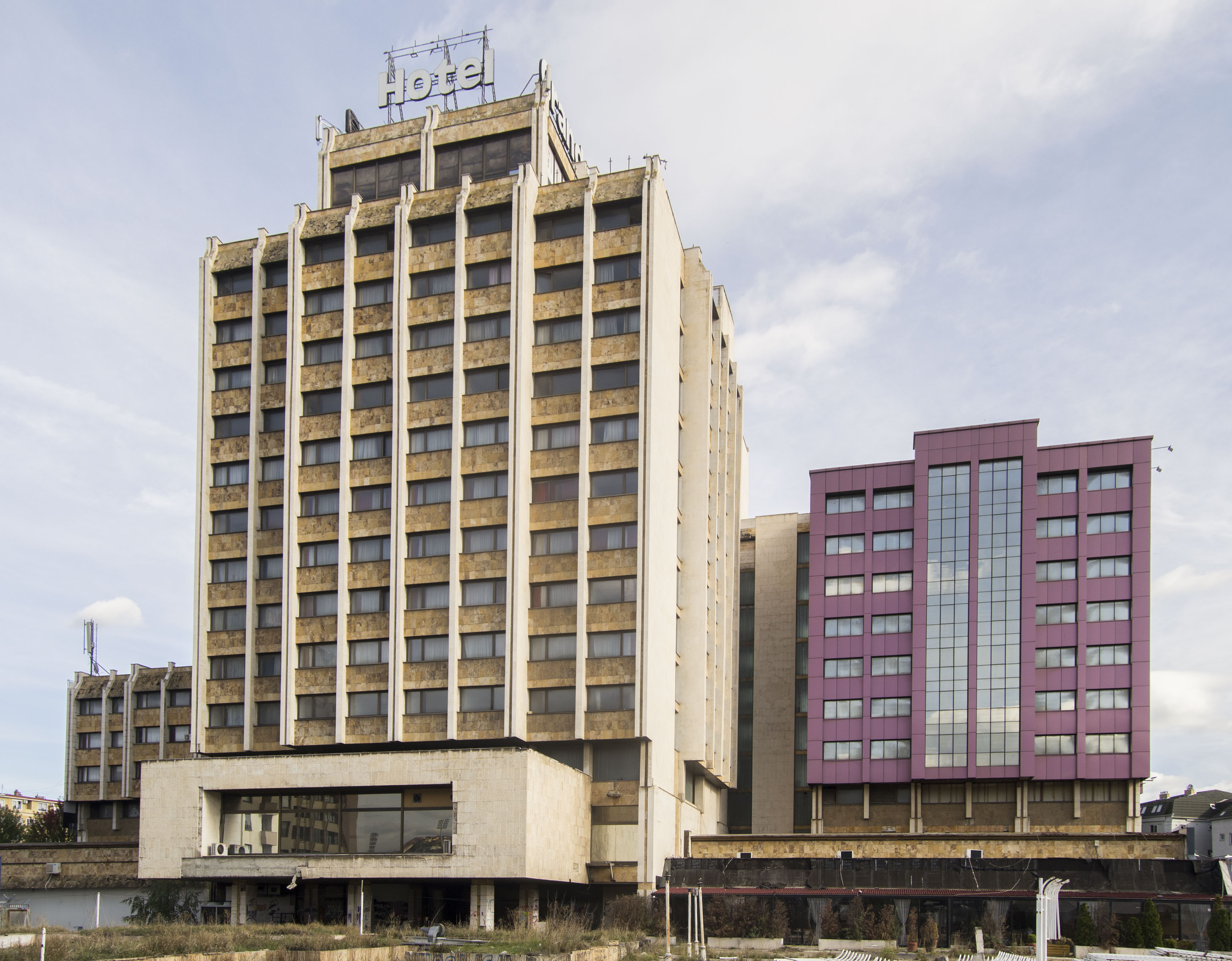
- Interactive map of the Grand Hotel Prishtina area

General information
- Type: Hotel
- Location: Mother Theresa Street, Pristina, Kosovo
- Coordinates: 42°39′36.18″N 21°9′34.16″E
- Construction started: 1974
- Completed: 1978; 48 years ago

Design and construction
- Architect: Bashkim Fehmiu Miša Jevremovic Dragan Kovačević

The Grand Hotel Prishtina is a hotel situated in the Mother Theresa Boulevard in downtown Pristina, the capital of Kosovo. Originally projected by the Albanian architect Bashkim Fehmiu together with the two Serbian architects Dragan Kovačević and Miša Jevremović, its building started in 1974 and was completed in 1978. The hotel features 350 rooms spread out on 13 floors, and covers a total area of over 32,000 m^{2} (340,000 sq ft). Today, however, only 1% of the rooms in the hotel are used for guests.

== History ==
The concept of the Grand Hotel in Prishtina came alongside the socialist urban development of the city. It is believed that Josip Broz Tito proposed the project, as an architectural plan for a hotel in the costal city Cavtat near Dubrovnik in Croatia. It failed due to the design being inappropriate for the climate in Cavtat.

Thus, the design was handed over to Bashkim Fehmiu, the first Albanian architect educated in Belgrade in the University of Belgrade, Faculty of Architecture. Bashkim was among the first architects involved in designing Grand Hotel, later collaborating with Miša Jevremovic and Dragan Kovačević, two architects from Belgrade. The interior of the hotel was curated by the Kosovar artist Matej Rodiqi.

The construction of the Hotel began initially in 1974 and it only took 4 years to finish, in 1978, the Grand Hotel officially opened its doors, as it became an icon of the city and was considered one of the best hotels in the region. Grand Hotel had 13 functional floors, 12 with rooms and the 13th with a restaurant, in total it had 360 rooms (202 rooms with one bed, 142 rooms with two beds, 9 rooms with 3 beds, 9 apartments and 2 residences), the hotel employed over 800 staff.

The Kosovo Provincial Assembly took out a loan for the construction of Grand Hotel from the Yugoslav Fund Bank, with an interest rate of 4%, which had to be returned by the Kosovo Bank.

In May 1979, Josip Broz Tito visited Kosovo right before his death in 1980, during his visit in Pristina, Tito stayed in a suite at Grand Hotel, which later was used by Zeljko Raznatovic also known as Arkan. Tito's suite included famous art pieces by Kosovar artist's, such as the painting “The Dinner,” by Gjelosh Gjokaj, which is now a part of the collection of the National Gallery of Kosovo.

During the 90s, the staff and the directorate of Grand Hotel were completely replaced, as Albanians were expelled from their jobs and replaced by Serbians. Dragisa Vuckovic became director of Grand Hotel, and of 15 other tourist facilities in Pristina, all of which are under SLOGA enterprise management, including Grand Hotel.

Between 1996 and 1999, Grand Hotel was used as a base of operations for Arkan's Tigers, according to Zekë Çeku, the director of Grand Hotel during 1984-1987 and 1999–2006, Arkan's Tigers were practically residing in Grand Hotel, as they wrote in the entry of the hotel "The entrance is forbidden for Albanians, Croats and dogs".

The situation of Grand Hotel had only worsened during the Kosovo War, as after the entry of KFOR soldiers they found several torture weapons, shoes, clothes and traces of human blood, as KFOR concluded that Grand Hotel was used for torture and rape by Serbian Paramilitaries.

== Privatization ==
After the war, Grand Hotel remained public until 2006, as it was privatized by the Kosovo Trust Agency in the 8th wave of privatizations on October 13, 2006. Initially, it was intended be sold to an international buyer, which led to many representatives of foreign hotel companies visiting Grand Hotel, but none of them were interested to buy due to the hotel's state.

After the first bidder had won the bid, shortly after being declared the winner of the tender, the said bidder withdrew. It is said that the bidder had pulled out due to initial threats by other bidders. The second bidder would become the new winner of the tender, Zelqif Berisha of the “Unio Commerce” company, who bought the hotel for 8 million and 160 thousand euros with two shareholders Behgjet Pacolli (owner of Mabetex Group and Swiss Diamond Hotel, and former president of Kosovo) with 40% and Remzi Ejupi (owner of the tourist agency Eurokoha). Although The Kosovo Privatization Agency only acknowledged Zelqif Berisha as the official owner.

Grand Hotel was privatized with the promise that all of its 200 employees would keep their employment, and the additional employment of 370 new employees, with a 20 million euro investment being made. In 2012, The Kosovo Privatization Agency took back Grand Hotel from its management due to the manager Zelqif Berisha not being able to make his investments and meet contract obligations. This resulted in Behgjet Pacolli suing the State of Kosovo in a court of appeal. Behgjet Pacolli would later end up losing due the suit, due to not being recognized as legitimate stakeholder.

Grand Hotel had become a fighting point for political clans that led to the mysterious death of the head of the Kosovo Agency for Privatization, Dino Asanaj, who, at the time, was heading the process for the privatization of Grand Hotel.

Today, the Kosovo Agency for Privatization still retains ownership of the hotel.

On the 4th of January 2025, Behgjet Pacolli announced on Facebook that he had won the case of Grand Hotel in the international arbitration court organized by the World Bank. The Government of Kosovo was obliged by the court to return the investment made by Pacolli through his company Mabco Construction. The Minister of Justice, Albulena Haxhiu, in a conference, stated that Grand Hotel remains under the ownership of the Republic of Kosovo, and continued by blaming the past governments for their incompetence regarding issues of the hotel.

== Manifesta 14 ==
The hotel was brought to the spotlight once again with the coming of the nomadic contemporary arts biennale Manifesta to Pristina. As Manifesta held their 14th edition in Pristina, Grand Hotel was chosen as one of the spaces for exhibition. The hotel's 6th floor was completely cleaned and readied for the exhibit, and other floors were used as well.

Catherine Nichols was responsible for curating all the exhibitions at Grand Hotel. The hotel's 3rd to 9th floors hosted exhibitions by over 30 artists from Kosovo as well as from the international art scene. The exhibition was called "The Grand Scheme of Things".

There was also an artistic exhibition on the façade of the hotel, with the iconic text located on the rooftop of Grand Hotel, designed by visual artist Petrit Halilaj, of shining stars being placed on the façade and the text "When the Sun Goes Away we Paint the Sky".

Manifesta 14, from the 22nd of July till the 30th of October, partly revitalized the hotel. This was largely due to Manifesta's 760 thousand euro investment into the revitalization of certain unused spaces. In the sum of 100 days, the Grand Hotel was visited by over 800 thousand guests, leaving an impact on the hotel and its legacy.

Today. the 6th floor of the hotel continues to serve as an exhibition hall for various artists.

== Gallery ==
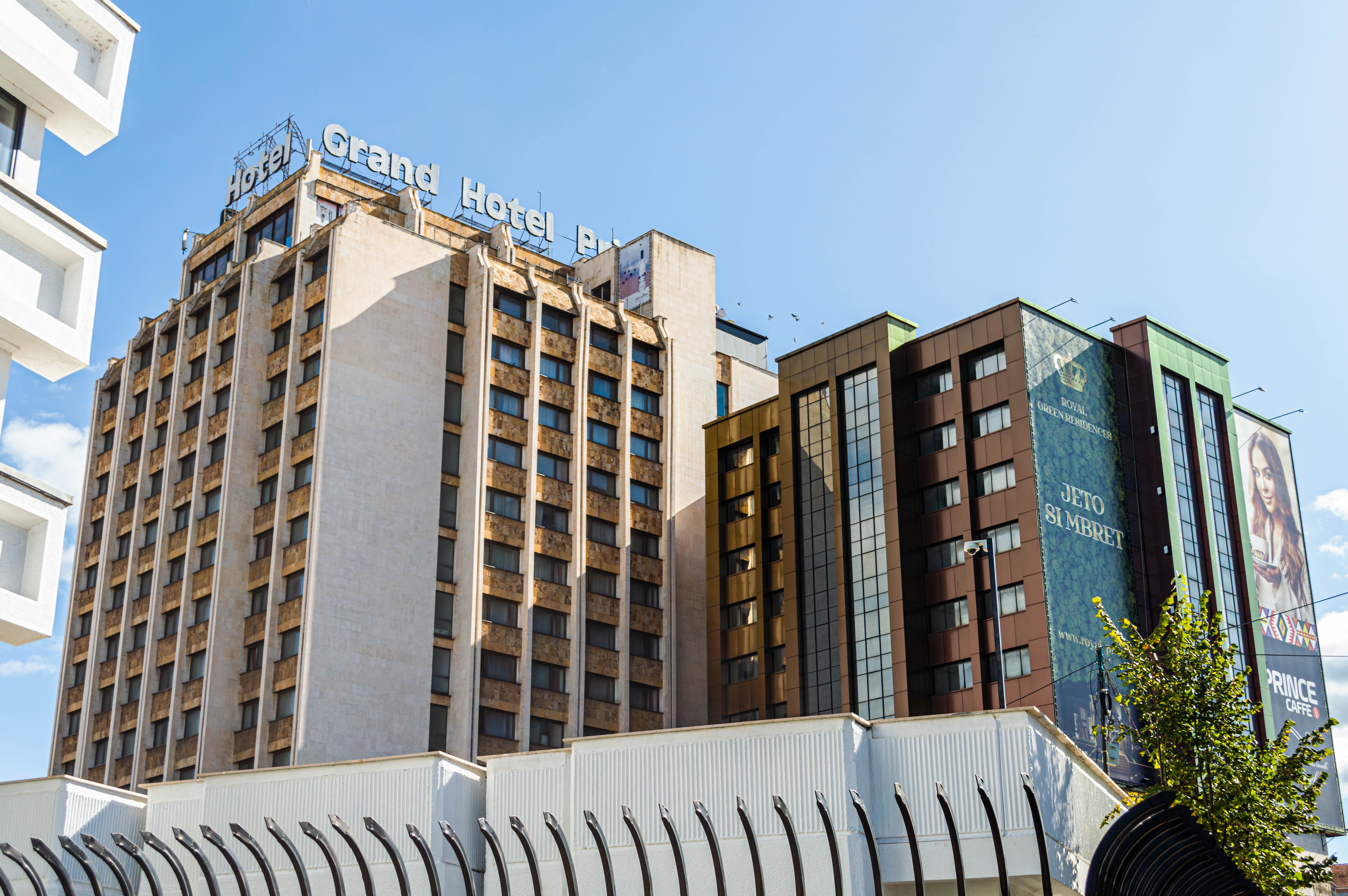

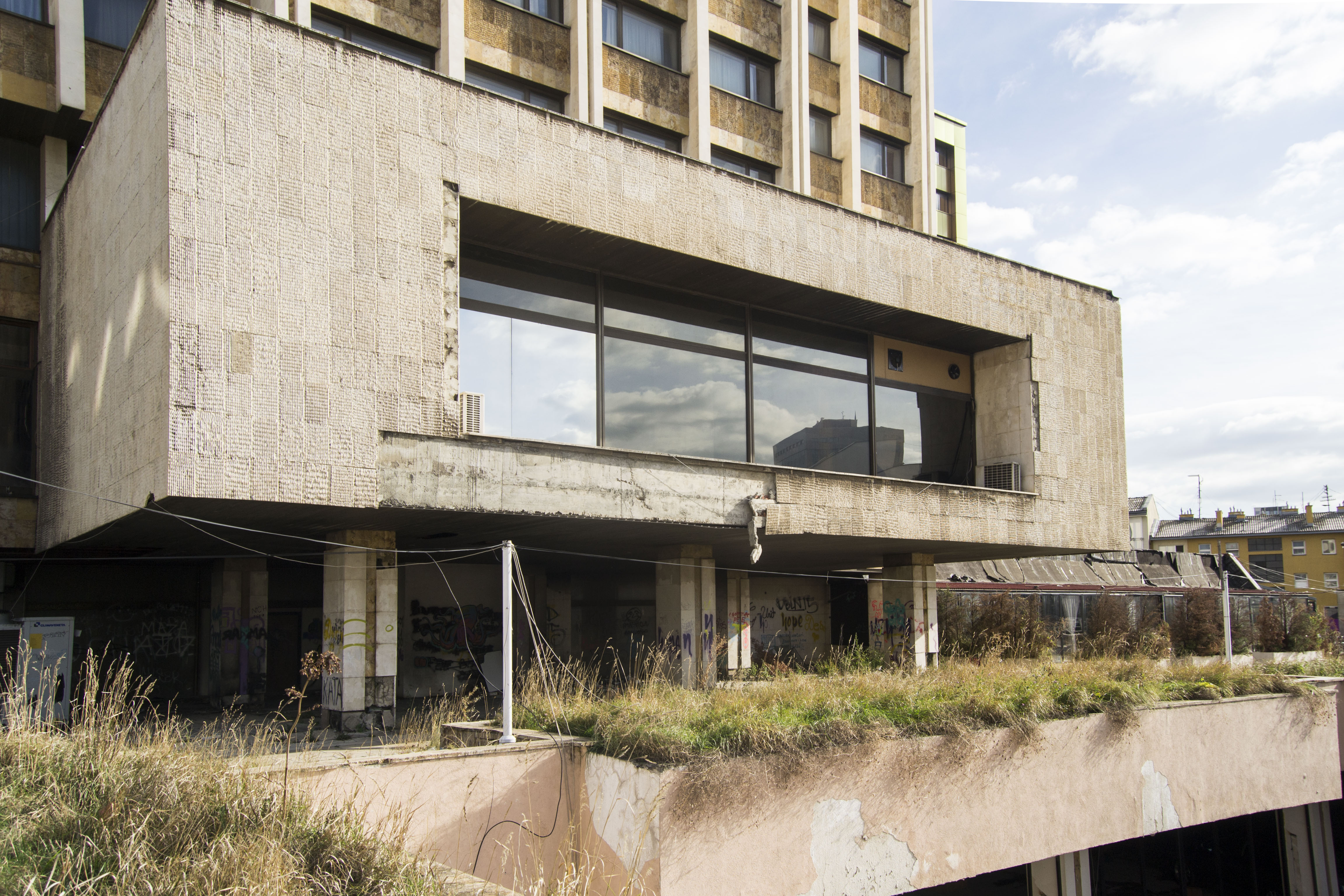

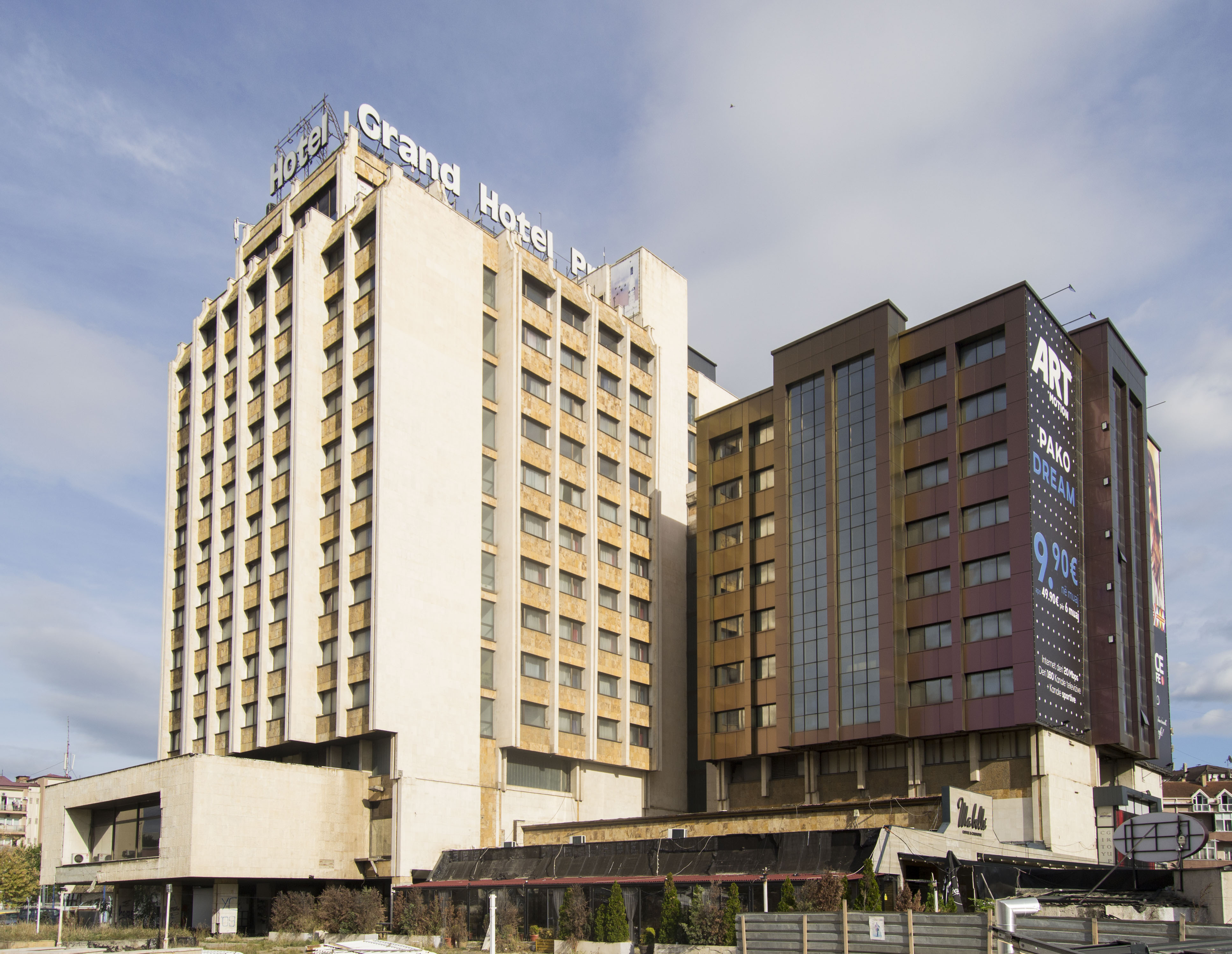

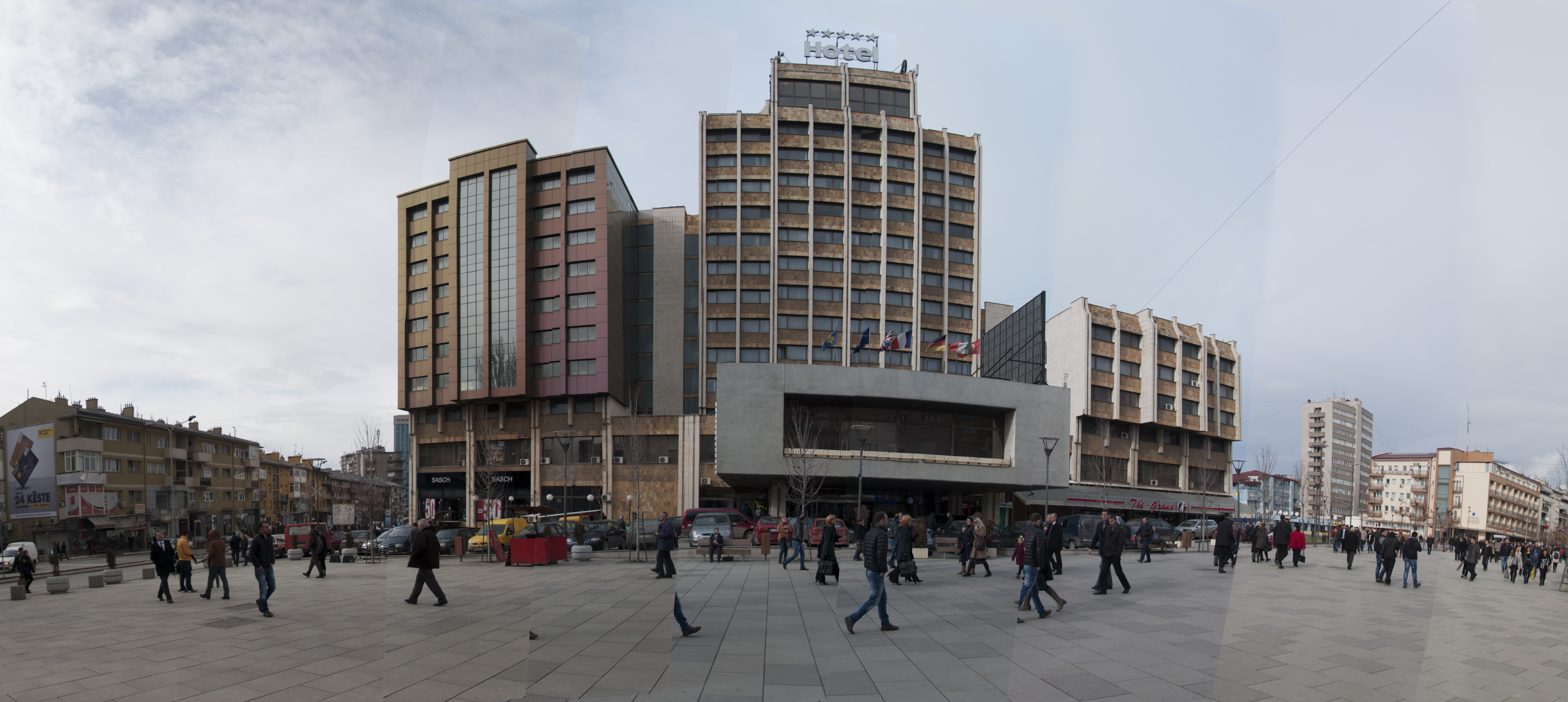

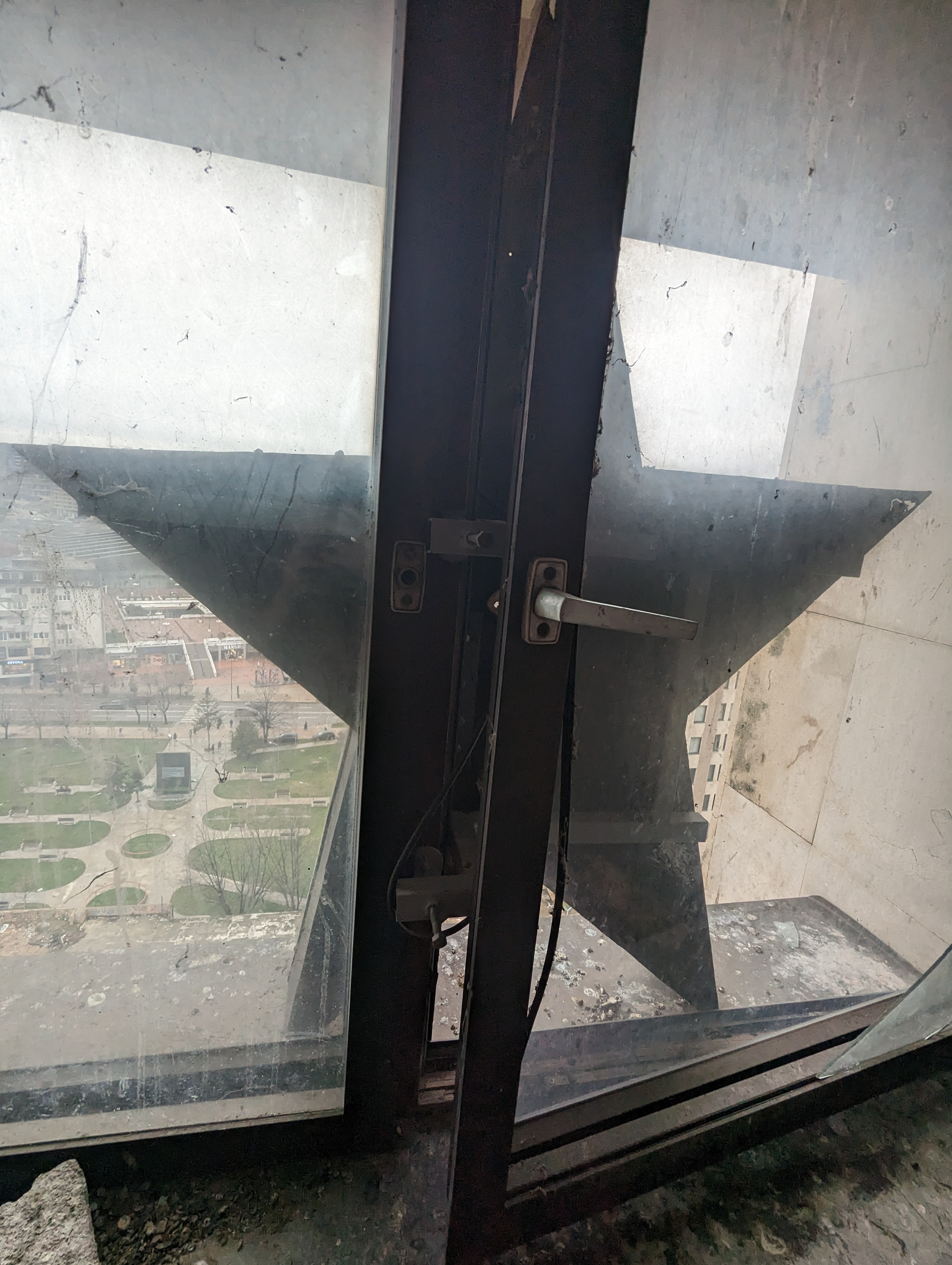
Hotel star from inside room

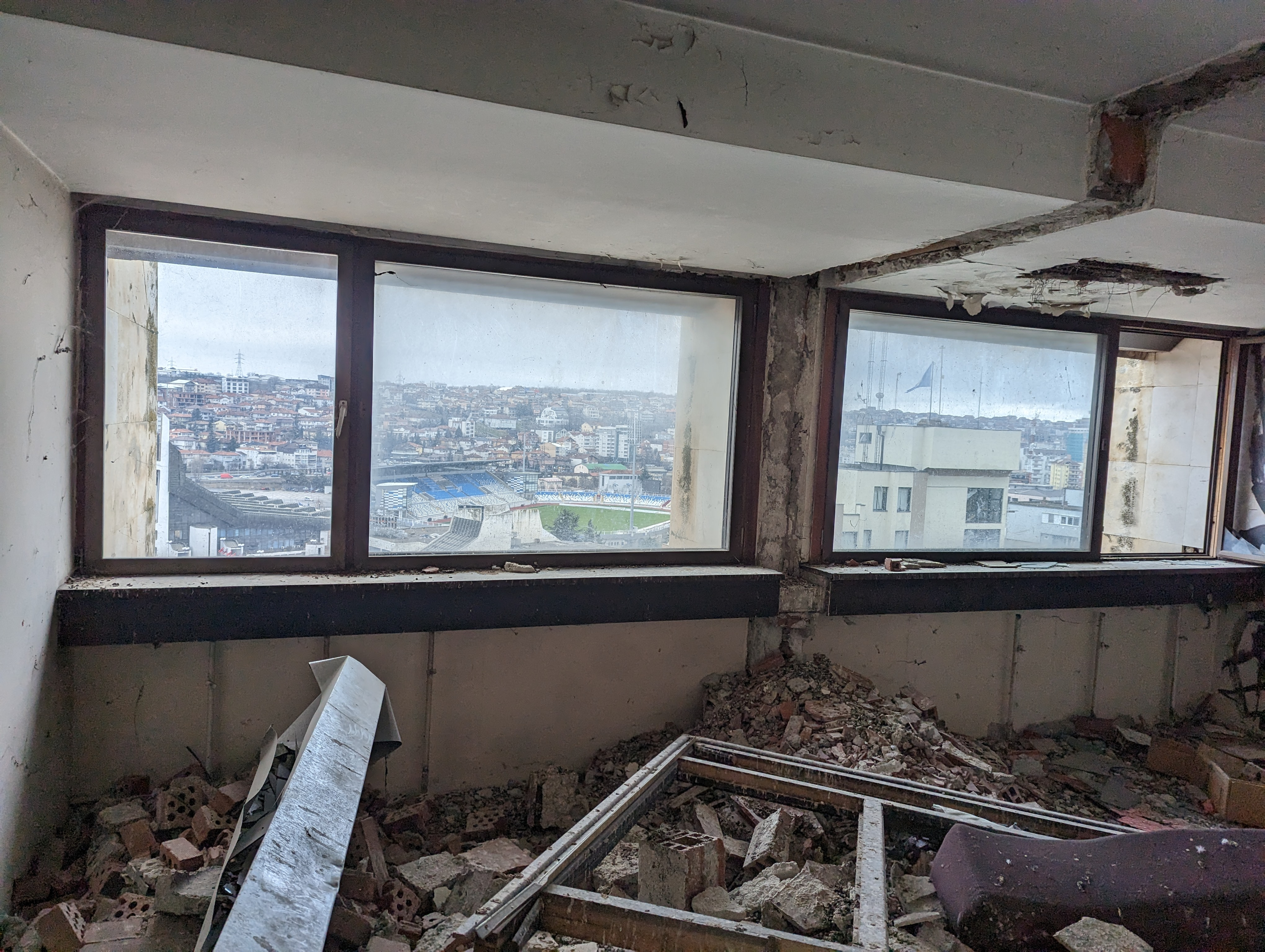
Abandoned hotel room

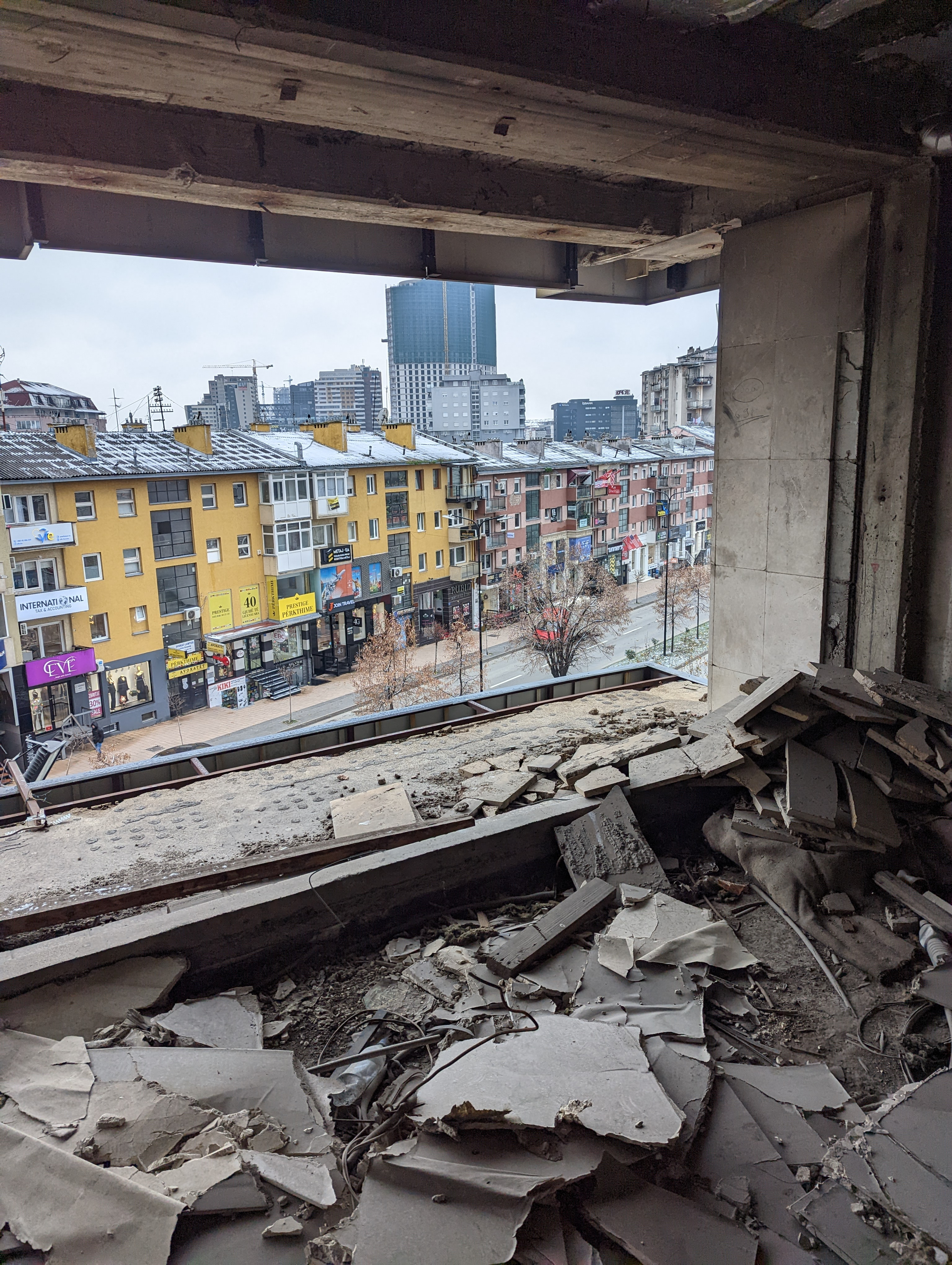
Destroyed room wall looking over street

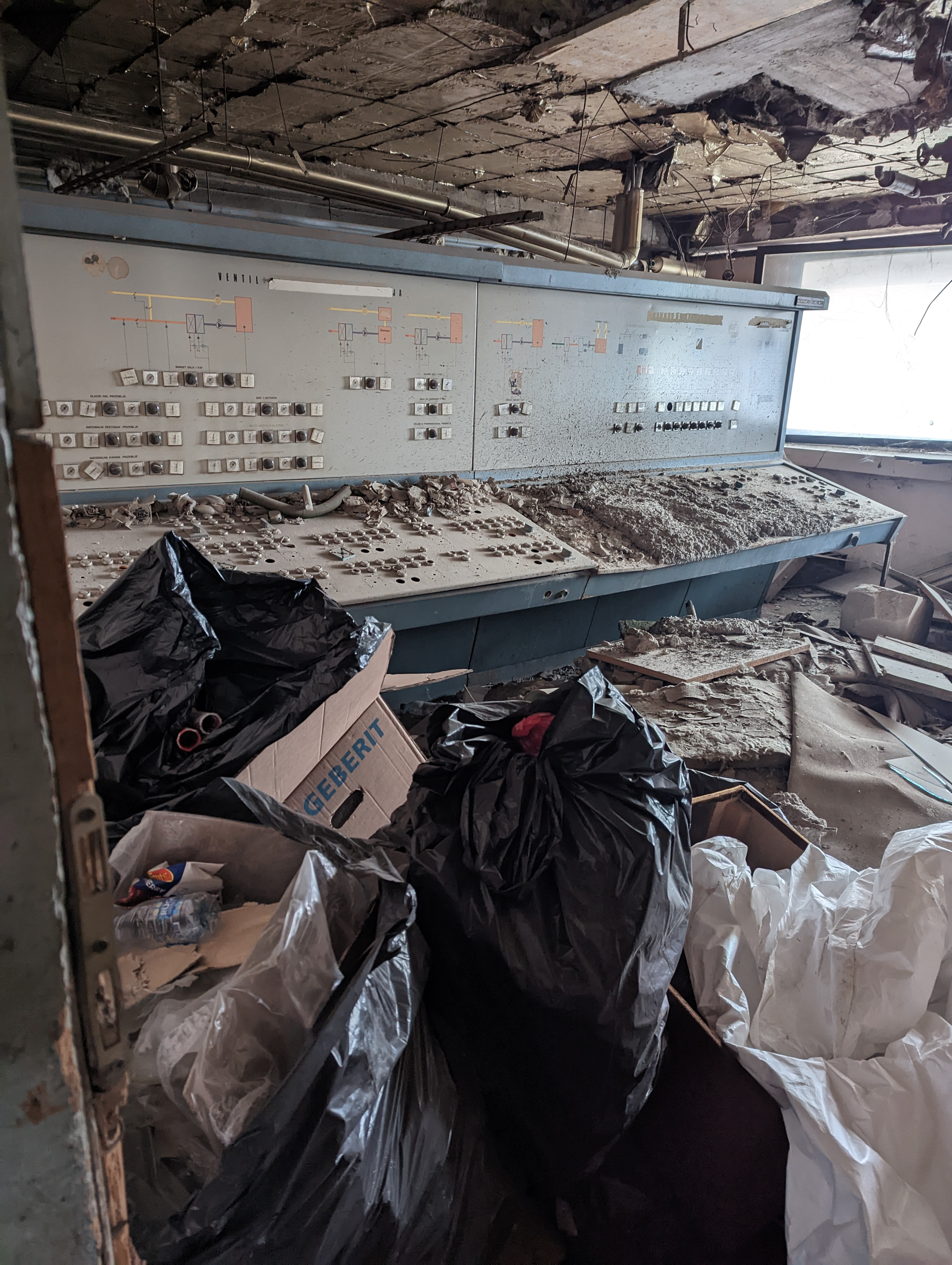
Abandoned Machinery

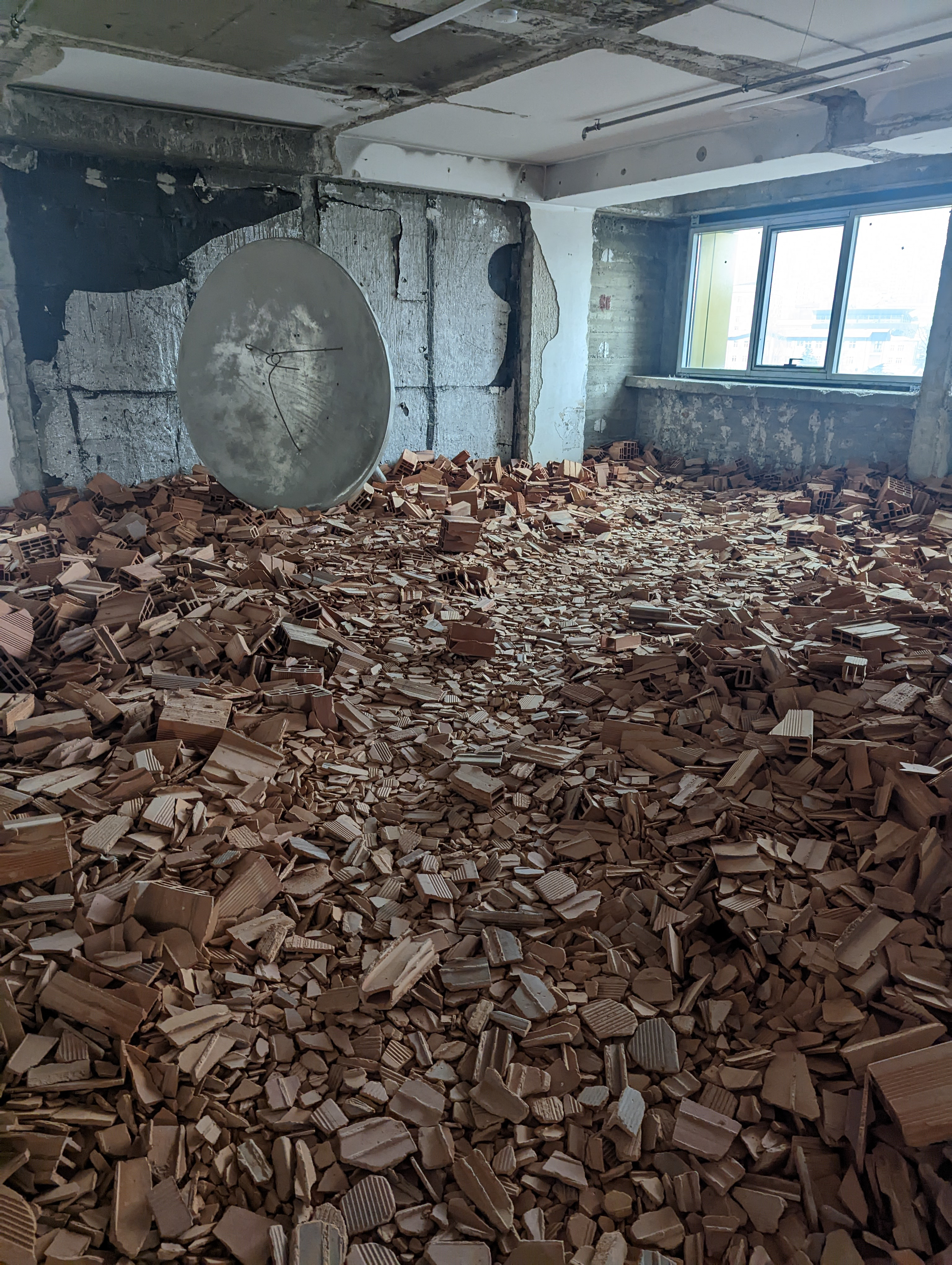
Tile room
