= Eugene Cussons =

South African primatologist (1979–2026)

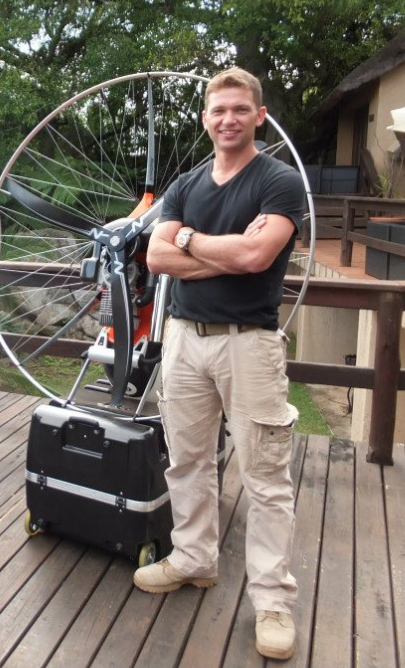
- Cussons in 2013
- Born: 6 July 1979; South Africa
- Died: 23 May 2026 (aged 46) near Hartbeespoort, North West, South Africa
- Education: University of Pretoria
- Spouse: Natasha
- Children: 1

Eugene Cussons (6 July 1979 – 23 May 2026) was a South African primatologist who was the managing director of Chimp Eden as well as Rescue Director of the Jane Goodall Institute (JGI) in South Africa. He was also the host of Animal Planet's Escape to Chimp Eden, author of the book Saving Chimpanzees: A Man on a Rescue Mission, and was the executive director and Ambassador of the "Generation Now" movement.

== Early life ==
Eugene Cussons was born in the Transvaal Province of South Africa on 6 July 1979. For generations, the Cussons family has been deeply rooted in the African conservation ethic, and Eugene grew up with a special appreciation for African wildlife. He studied business management and economics at the University of Pretoria.

Cussons had a successful career in the corporate world developing software for financial trading applications before building Chimp Eden. Deciding he did not want to be deskbound for the rest of his career, He returned to the family game reserve to combine his management skills with his love for the outdoors.

== Chimp Eden ==
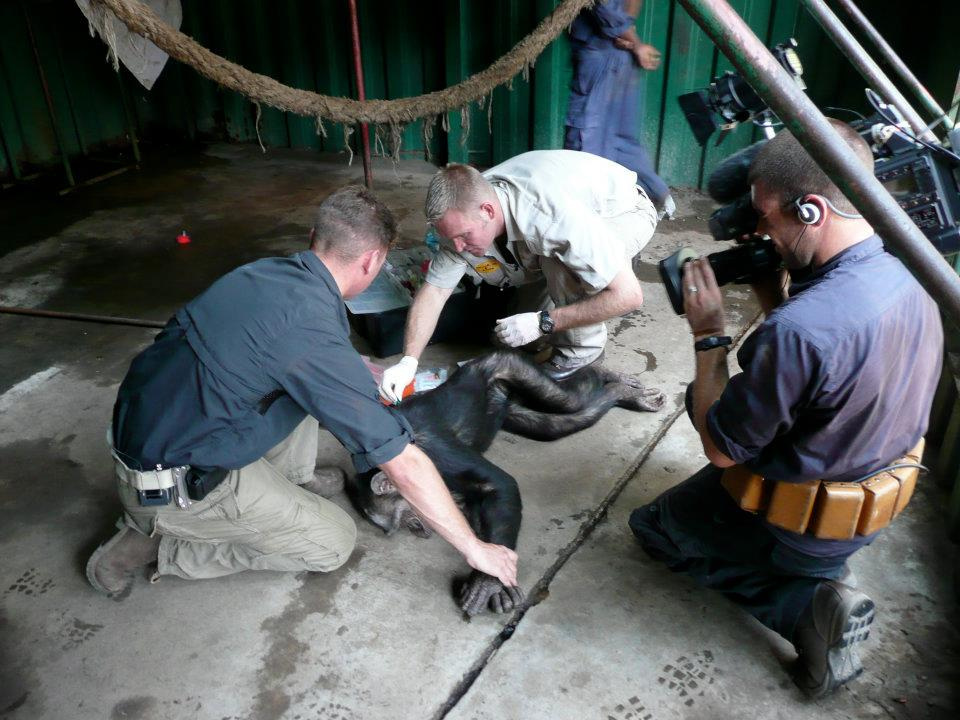
Cussons helping to treat a chimpanzee in 2013

Cussons served as the managing director of Chimp Eden in South Africa, a chimpanzee sanctuary affiliated with the Jane Goodall Institute. He focused Chimp Eden's efforts on rescuing chimpanzees from areas into which no one else was willing to venture, such as war-torn countries like Sudan and Angola. Personally rescuing the chimpanzees, he brought them back to Chimp Eden.

In 2008, Cussons documented his travels and chimp rescues in the television series Escape to Chimp Eden on Animal Planet.

== Generation Now ==
Cussons was the founder and executive director of Generation Now Africa, a youth-focused initiative focused on the fight against poaching and wildlife exploitation, while training the next generation of conservationists.

== Personal life and death ==
On 23 May 2026, Cussons was killed in a collision involving a paramotor near Hartbeespoort Dam. He was 46 years old. He is survived by his wife Natasha and their daughter Hayley.
