= Escape to Chimp Eden =

- Genre: Nature, documentary
- Created by: Eugene Cussons
- Directed by: Anton Truesdale
- Country of origin: United States
- Original language: English
- No. of seasons: 2
- No. of episodes: 32

Production
- Executive producers: Erik Nelson; Dave Harding; Phil Fairclough
- Production location: South Africa
- Running time: 30 minutes

Original release
- Network: Animal Planet
- Release: February 8, 2008 – June 4, 2009

Escape to Chimp Eden is a television series broadcast on Animal Planet that premiered on February 8, 2008. The series examines the rescue of abused and neglected chimpanzees at Chimp Eden, a sanctuary operated by the Jane Goodall Institute.

== History ==
In Escape to Chimp Eden, Eugene Cussons rescues and rehabilitates abused chimpanzees in South Africa. The Animal Planet show was created by Triosphere and Creative Differences.

== Featured chimpanzees ==
Chimp	Approx. Age	Date of Rescue	Status	Enclosure
Abu	16 Years	March 2006	Deceased	N/A
Amadeus	13 Years	March 2006	Alpha Male	Adult
Azzie	1.5 Years	July 2008	Infant Female	Juvenile 2
Bazia	3 Years	July 2008	Infant Female	Juvenile 2
Bruce	Unknown	Died at Sudan Safe House 2007	Deceased	N/A
Charlene	2.5 Years	July 2008	Infant Female	Juvenile 2
Charles	Unknown	November 2008	Alpha Male	Juvenile 2
Charlie	2 Years	April 2007	Infant Male	Juvenile 1
Claudette	14 Years	January 1996, Moved from Johannesburg Zoo to Chimp Eden in 2008	3rd Female	Adult
Cozy	11 Years	April 2006	3rd Male	Juvenile 1
Dinka	2 Years	April 2007	Infant Male	Juvenile 1
Guida	7 Years	October 2006	Deceased	N/A
Jessica	25 Years	December 2008	Adult Female	Juvenile 2
Jinga	13 Years	November 2006	Alpha Female	Adult
Joao	60-65 Years	April 2006	2nd Male	Juvenile 1
Josephine	18 Years	October 2007	Adult Female	Adult
Lika	13 Years	October 2006	5th Female	Adult
Lilly	2 Years	July 2008	Infant Female	Juvenile 2
Marco	5 Years	July 2008	Infant Male	Juvenile 2
Martha	14 Years	July 2008	Adult Female	Juvenile 2
Mary	3.5 Years	July 2008	Infant Female	Juvenile 2
Mimi	13 Years	October 2006	2nd Female	Adult
Mowgli	3.5 Years	July 2008	Infant Male	Juvenile 2
Nikki	11 Years	March 2006	2nd Male	Adult
Nina	4 Years	April 2007	Infant Female	Juvenile 1
Sally	3 Years	July 2006	Infant Female	Juvenile 1
Sampa	5 Years	October 2007	Adolescent Female	Juvenile 1
Suzie	6 Years	July 2008	Adult Female	Juvenile 2
Tamu	1.5 Years	July 2008	Infant Male	Juvenile 2
Thomas	4 Years	April 2007	Infant Male	Juvenile 1
Tony	3 Years	October 2007	Infant Male	Juvenile 1
Zeena	4 Years	July 2006	Infant Female	Juvenile 1
Zacarias	17 Years	October 2006	Alpha Male	Juvenile 1
Zee	2 Years	April 2007	Infant Female	Juvenile 1

Between Seasons 1 and 2, Abu and Guida died. Guida died in the episode The Rise and Fall of Guida due to syndrome, suffering complications from congestive heart failure. Abu's death was aired in the previous episode.

== See also ==
- Animal rights
- Animal rescue (disambiguation)
- Animal sanctuary
- Animal welfare
- Cruelty to animals
