= Michael Bengwayan =

Filipino environmental activist

Michael Bengwayan is a Filipino environmental activist best known for his advocacy of using the Petroleum nut (Pittosporum resiniferum) as an alternative bio-fuel in the Philippines, and his involvement with advocacies to save trees from being cut, notably the Save 182 Movement which petitioned to stop the earth-balling 182 trees at Luneta Hill, Baguio, by mall developer SM, and the campaign to stop the cutting of 1,200 trees along the Manila North Road, in the towns of Binalonan and Pozorrubio, Pangasinan.

Bengwayan is the director of the Cordillera Ecological Center, and is also the proprietor of The Habitat, a five hectare farm in Tublay, Benguet which partly serves as an ecotourism site, an ecological reserve containing indigenous trees of Philippine Cordillera, and a demonstration farm for the intercropping of Arabica coffee, pineapple, pine trees, and petroleum nut.
