= Comunidad Inti Wara Yassi =

Bolivian NGO focused on wildlife rights and rescue

- Founded: 1992 (First office opened in 1996 in Villa Tunari, Bolivia)
- Founders: Tania "Nena" Baltazar, Juan Carlos Antezana,
- Type: Non-governmental organization
- Purpose: Animal rights; conservation
- Headquarters: Villa Tunari, Bolivia
- Region served: Bolivia
- Method: Education; wildlife care; research; lobbying
- Official language: Spanish; English
- Key people: Tania Baltazar (President)
- Affiliations: Friends of Inti Wara Yassi UK; Friends of Inti Wara Yassi Australia
- Revenue: $416,000 (2010)
- Funding: Grants; donations; volunteer payments
- Employees: 15
- Volunteers: 45–140
- Website: intiwarayassi.org

Comunidad Inti Wara Yassi (CIWY) is a Bolivian non-governmental organization dedicated to environmental education and the care of sick, mistreated and abandoned wildlife. It is the country's largest destination for confiscated wildlife and currently cares for around 500 animals, most of them rescued from the illegal wildlife trade.

The organization also carries out environmental activism and education about animal rights and conservation. The name comprises words from three indigenous languages meaning sun, star and moon in the Quechua, Aymara and Chiriguano Guaraní languages.

CIWY is supported by international volunteers that stay for a minimum of two weeks.

== History ==
In 1986, Juan Carlos Antezana and Tania "Nena" Baltazar began working with impoverished youth in a small neighborhood in El Alto, La Paz. They worked to support the needs of miners' children who had relocated to the area, providing alternative education including carpentry workshops, tailoring, horticulture in greenhouses and other activities.

As part of the education program, the children were taken on field trips to the Yungas region of La Paz. During one such trip, the children witnessed the effect of man's impact on the environment and the effect that slash-and-burn agriculture has on wildlife. This deeply affected the children, and they agreed to create an environmental movement with the aim of showing the public the negative effect of destroying the rainforest and other activities that cause damage to nature. Marches were held in La Paz, Oruro, Santa Cruz, Sucre and Cochabamba. These youth formed an integral part of CIWY's early attempts to raise awareness of environmental destruction.

During another field trip, the children witnessed blatant abuse of wildlife: they found a spider monkey in the city of Rurrenabaque kept in a local bar. Antezana and Baltazar rescued, treated, and released the monkey. However, the monkey returned to Rurrenabaque and was again captured. Antezana and Baltazar realized a wildlife sanctuary would be necessary to protect these animals. CIWY was formally organized in 1992. The organization worked with and cared for rescued animals in a Japanese garden in La Paz until 1996, when the mayor of Villa Tunari granted conditional use of Parque Machía for the organization's rescue efforts.

Friends of Inti Wara Yassi (FIWY) became a registered UK charity in 2008, with the famous primatologist Jane Goodall as its Patron. CIWY enjoyed the privilege of being visited by Dr. Goodall in 2009. She visited Parque Machía and Parque Ambue Ari to support CIWY's work with animals and the environment.

CIWY was devastated during the COVID-19 pandemic as international volunteers were unable to travel.

In 2021, The Puma Years, a memoir by Laura Coleman was published about Coleman's time with CIWY at Parque Ambue Ari. It became a number-one bestseller on Amazon upon release. Proceeds from the book are being donated to CIWY.

== Mission ==
CIWY rescues, rehabilitates and cares for wild animals seized from illegal trafficking, and fights to end the animal trade through educational programs, research projects and public actions. Through this work, CIWY aims to inspire humankind to uphold values that promote conservation and the recuperation of biodiversity.

== Vision ==
CIWY's vision is a world in which wildlife thrives and lives freely in its natural habitat, free from the dangers of poaching and the destruction of its ecosystems.

== Objectives ==
CIWY's primary objectives are:

To defend the environment and conserve biodiversity. To rescue and rehabilitate wildlife that has fallen victim to trafficking and abuse. To responsibly manage and care for rescued wild animals. To coordinate and conduct research and education programs that support our conservation efforts.

== Work ==
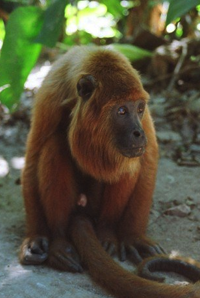
Howler monkey under CIWY's care at Parque Ambue Ari

As Bolivia's leading organisation in the fight for animal rights and wildlife conservation, CIWY works to combat the illegal wildlife trade and the destruction of the environment. CIWY collaborates with the Bolivian authorities to enforce the law, to seize and rescue animals from poachers and merchants, as well as zoos when conditions do not meet legal requirements. CIWY also rehabilitates wild animals that were injured by fires or other disasters. Additionally, CIWY conducts educational projects locally and nationally, as well as research projects, and scientific dissemination.

=== Wildlife sanctuaries ===
CIWY operates three wildlife sanctuaries distributed throughout Bolivia: Machía, Ambue Ari and Jacj Cuisi. The sanctuaries are managed by a team of professionals and volunteers from around the world.

==== Parque Machía ====
Parque Machía is situated in Villa Tunari in Chapare Province, in the department of Cochabamba. In 1996 the municipal council of Villa Tunari granted CIWY use of the park's land under the condition that CIWY looked after it, as it was under threat from deforestation and poaching. The sanctuary specializes in the care of spider monkeys and capuchin monkeys.

Animals that are cared for include pumas, ocelots, capuchin monkeys, spider monkeys, an Andean bear, coati, parrots and toucans.

In 2009, the municipal council of Villa Tunari approved the construction of a road that would cut through the park in order to improve access to communities. Despite an international campaign against the road, construction began in 2010. The road has loosened ground soil, causing landslides during the heavy rainy seasons, not only making the road impassable for much of the year, but also contributing to further loss of habitat for CIWY's efforts. In 2009, Jane Goodall visited Villa Tunari to speak against the destruction of the road. In 2010, four pumas were relocated to Parque Jacj Cuisi as a result of land loss due to the road's construction.

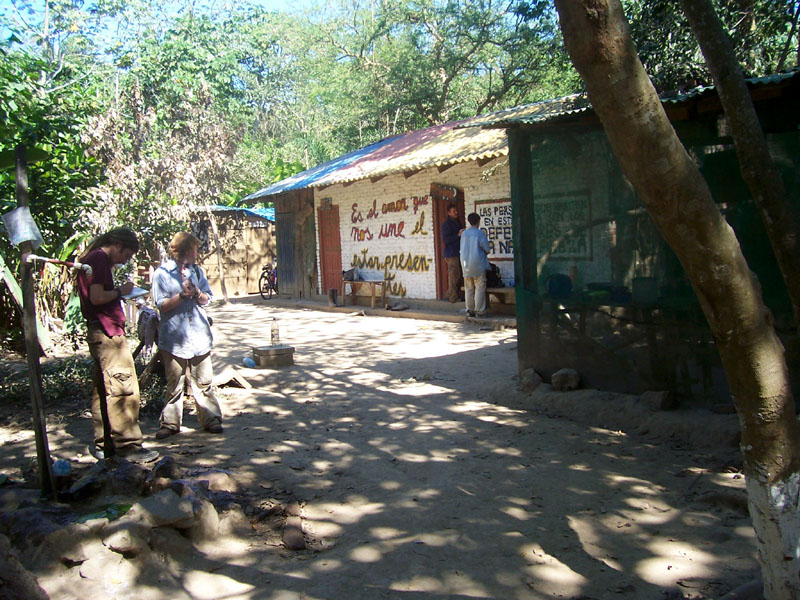
Volunteer dormitory at Parque Ambue Ari

==== Parque Ambue Ari ====
Parque Ambue Ari is an 800-hectare wildlife sanctuary located in the department of Santa Cruz between the cities of Santa Cruz and Trinidad. Unlike the land used in Parque Machia, Parque Ambue Ari's is owned by CIWY. It was purchased in 2002 from a local cacao farmer. The sanctuary was opened in order to work more independently and to house an increasing number of rescued wildlife. 'Ambue Ari' means "new day" in the native language Guarayo.

The natural habitat within Parque Ambue Ari is an ideal location to care for jaguars, pumas, ocelots, exotic birds, tapirs, coati and red howler monkeys; however, local farmers have encroached on the sanctuary's land and hunters have been found within its territory.

The organization is in charge of the medical aspects of all animals while volunteers help by cleaning cages, feeding the animals, providing enrichment, and assisting in construction or maintenance.

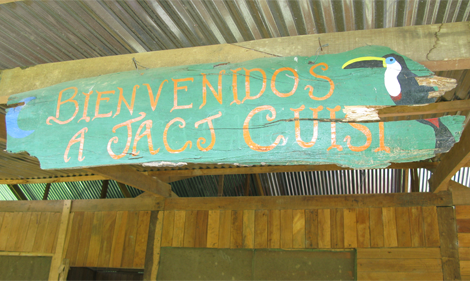
Welcome sign at Parque Jacj Cuisi

==== Parque Jacj Cuisi ====
In 2008, additional land was purchased outside Rurrenabaque to found a third sanctuary: Parque Jacj Cuisi. Jacj Cuisi encompasses 300 hectares located approximately 35 km from the village of San Buenaventura. Its location is important for the development of CIWY's work, as it is linked to the Madidi National Park, a 1.8-million hectare reserve and an ideal land for reintroduction programs. 'Jacj Cuisi' means "land of dreams" in the native language Mosetan Tacana.

=== Education ===
CIWY's beginnings were in educating poor children of El Alto, La Paz. Through the years, as CIWY's work began to encompass wildlife care and environmentalism, the type of education provided changed to focus on these topics. Today, CIWY visits cities and villages throughout Bolivia to put on educational programs for youth.

== International partnerships ==
CIWY today has branches in England, Australia, Switzerland, and Israel. All were founded and are run by former volunteers.

CIWY has the support of Jane Goodall and the Jane Goodall Institute. In October 2009, Jane Goodall visited Parque Machía and Parque Ambue Ari. CIWY is also supported by One Voice, a French animal rights organization; and The Monkey Sanctuary, a British organization that cares for rescued monkeys. In 2011, Luis Morales visited and assisted The Monkey Sanctuary.

In 2010, Baltazar and CIWY were again recognized, this time by One Voice, a French animal rights organization. After participating with One Voice in a silent protest for animal rights below the Eiffel Tower, One Voice offered Baltazar a donation to be used for the purchase of a vehicle. In 2011, the funds were used to purchase CIWY's first vehicle.

== See also ==
- Tourism in Bolivia
- Animal sanctuary
- List of animal rights groups
