= Sasaab =

Sasaab is a traditionally tented safari lodge in Samburu wilderness. Situated close to the Buffalo Springs and Samburu National Reserve and above the Ewaso Nyiro River where herds of elephants frequently bathe, it has seven tents and two interconnected family suites. The tents have traditional Swahili-style wooden entrance and Moroccan-style structural design.

Sasaab has a clear view of Laikipia Plateau toward the jagged peak of Mount Kenya and habitat of several wild animals including ‘Samburu Special Five’: the Beisa oryx, Grevy's zebra, reticulated giraffe, Somali ostrich and Gerenuk antelope.

Sasaab supports Samburu local community by funding dental and eye clinics and conservative initiatives including The Grevy's Zebra Trust, Conservation Scholars and School Lunch Programme. Samburu local community members make up 75% of Sasaab employees.

It was awarded Global Ecosphere Retreat (GER) status in 2022 by The Long Run for its impact on the environment and the surrounding communities.
