= Nena Baltazar =

Bolivian environmentalist

- Born: Tania Baltazar Lugones; 1972 (age 52–53); Nor Yungas Province, Bolivia
- Known for: Environmental activism
- Title: President of Comunidad Inti Wara Yassi (2010–present)
- Board member of: Comunidad Inti Wara Yassi
- Awards: Prize for Women's Creativity in Rural Life (Women's World Summit Foundation)

Tania "Nena" Baltazar Lugones (born October 31, 1972) is the co-founder and president of Comunidad Inti Wara Yassi, a non-governmental organization that runs three wildlife sanctuaries in Bolivia. Since the organization's founding in 1992, Baltazar has grown the organization from a single sanctuary with a few rescued animals to become Bolivia's foremost wildlife protection body, caring for more than 500 animals from fifty different species. Animals there have been rescued from illegal wildlife tade, habitat loss, and illegal hunting.

Baltazar has said she draws inspiration from the work of Jane Goodall.
