= Lang'ata =

Lang'ata Langata
- Location in Kenya
- Coordinates: 01°21′58″S 36°44′17″E
- Country: Kenya
- County: Nairobi County
- Time zone: UTC+3 (EAT)

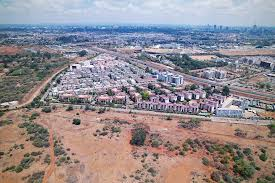
Kutch Prant, an area in Langa'ta next to the national park

Lang'ata is a predominantly upper middle-class residential suburb of Nairobi in Kenya. The suburb consists of many smaller housing developments, referred to as estates. They include Nairobi Dam, Otiende, Southlands, Ngei, Jambo Estate, Onyonka, Madaraka Estate, Kutch Prant, Rubia, NHC Langata, Akiba, Sun Valley, Royal Park and many others. These developments are primarily maisonettes or apartment blocks.

== Location ==
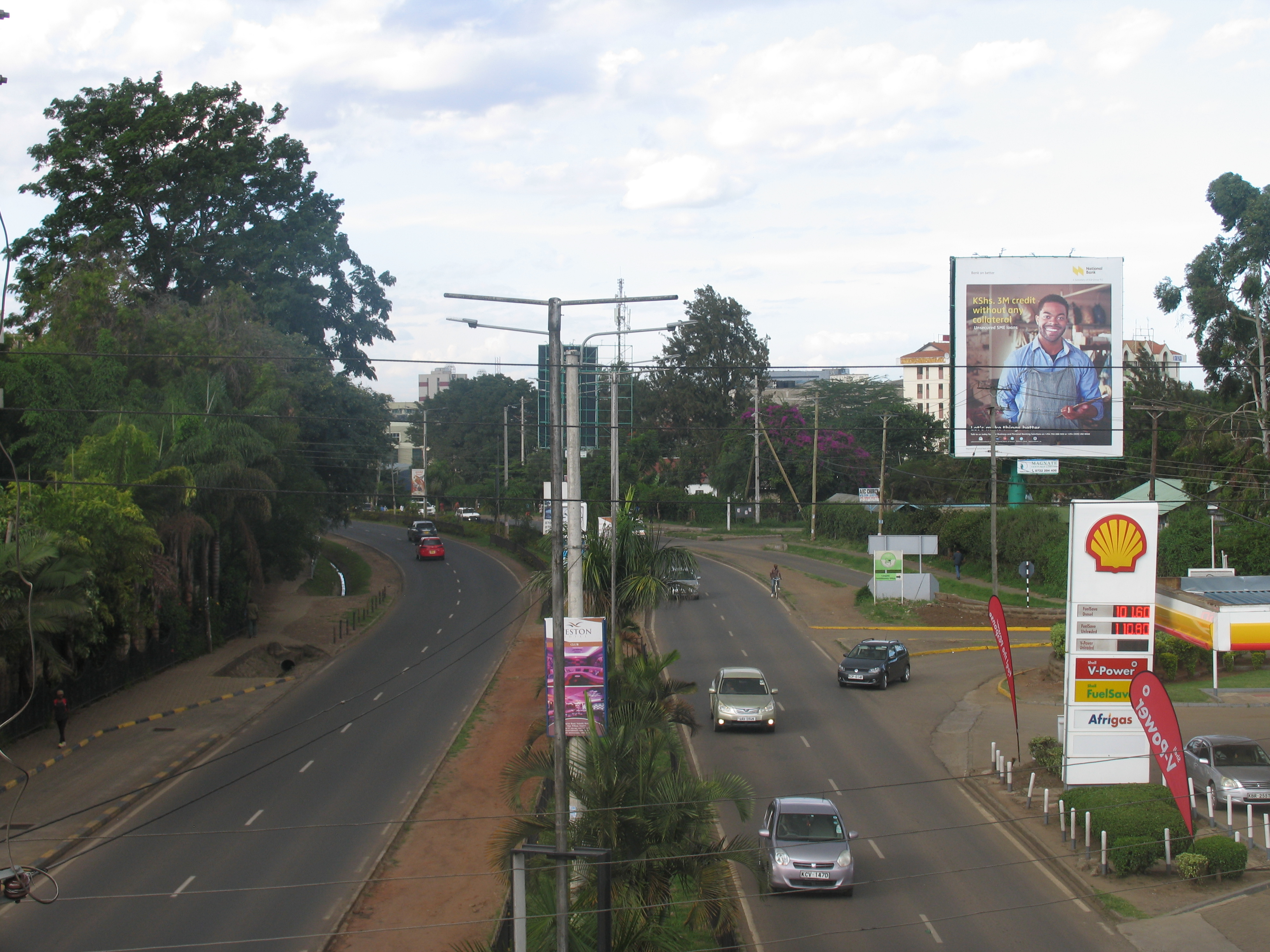
Langa'ta road

Lang'ata lies southwest of the city's central business district, east of Karen, approximately 18 kilometres (11 mi), by road, from the centre of Nairobi. It lies mainly along the similarly named Langata Road, which runs from the Mombasa Road junction at Nyayo Stadium to Karen Shopping Centre, at the Ngong Road junction. However, the area known as Lang'ata terminates at the Magadi Road Junction at the Galleria Mall. The coordinates of Lang'ata are:1°21'58.0"S, 36°44'17.0"E (Latitude:-1.366111; Longitude:36.738056).

== Overview ==
Lang'ata has several attractions such as the Giraffe Centre, the Uhuru Gardens, and a tourist village, Bomas of Kenya. Lang'ata also has the Carnivore Restaurant and the adjoining Carnivore grounds, where concerts are hosted. Wilson Airport, the largest private airport in Kenya, can also be found in Lang'ata.

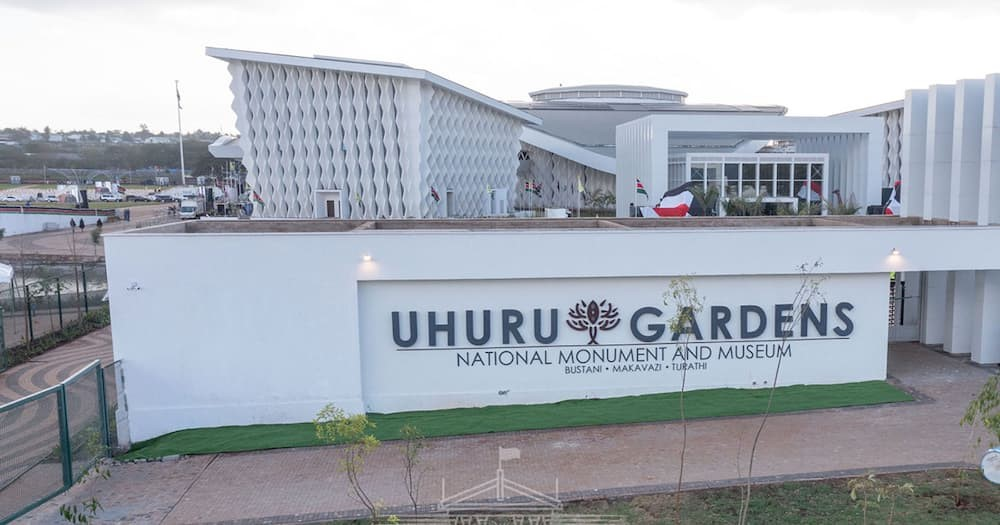
A national museum where concerts are held

The Langata Constituency covers affluent estates Karen and Lang'ata, but most of its voters come from Kibera, the largest slum in Kenya. This has now been subdivided into the Lang'ata and Kibra constituencies.

== Education ==
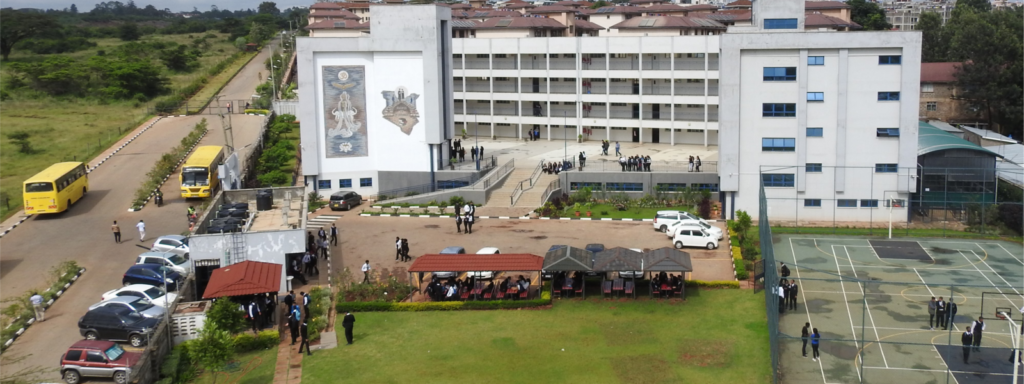
Shree Cutchi Leva Patel Samaj College

- Strathmore University, in Madaraka Estate
- Shree Cutchi Leva Patel Samaj College, near Kutch Prant
- Nairobi Japanese School, in the Lang'ata area
- Main campus of Catholic University of Eastern Africa, in Langata
- The area is home to several primary and secondary schools, including the Brookhouse School, a private, co-educational day and residential secondary school.
- Sunshine Secondary School, beside Dam Estate
- Amref International University, opposite Wilson Airport

There are also several primary schools in the area, both public and private. These include:

- Langata West Primary School, located in Ngei I
- Langata Road Primary School, along the similarly named road
- Uhuru Gardens Primary
- Ngei Primary School, located in Ngei II, next to Southlands Estate.
- Briar Rose Academy, a private kindergarten and primary school, between Royal Park Estate and Sun Valley Estate
- PCEA Langata Junior School, a private school
- Langata High School, a public secondary school in the Southlands area
- Langata Junior School

== Notable landmarks ==
- Nyayo National Stadium, a multipurpose sports complex
- Wilson Airport, a hub for small and medium passenger aircraft plying both local and regional (East African) routes
- T-Mall, a shopping and recreation complex at the junction of Mbagathi and Langata Roads
- Langata Army Barracks, home to Maroon Commandos
- Kenya Wildlife Service headquarters at the Nairobi National Park
