= Giraffe Centre =

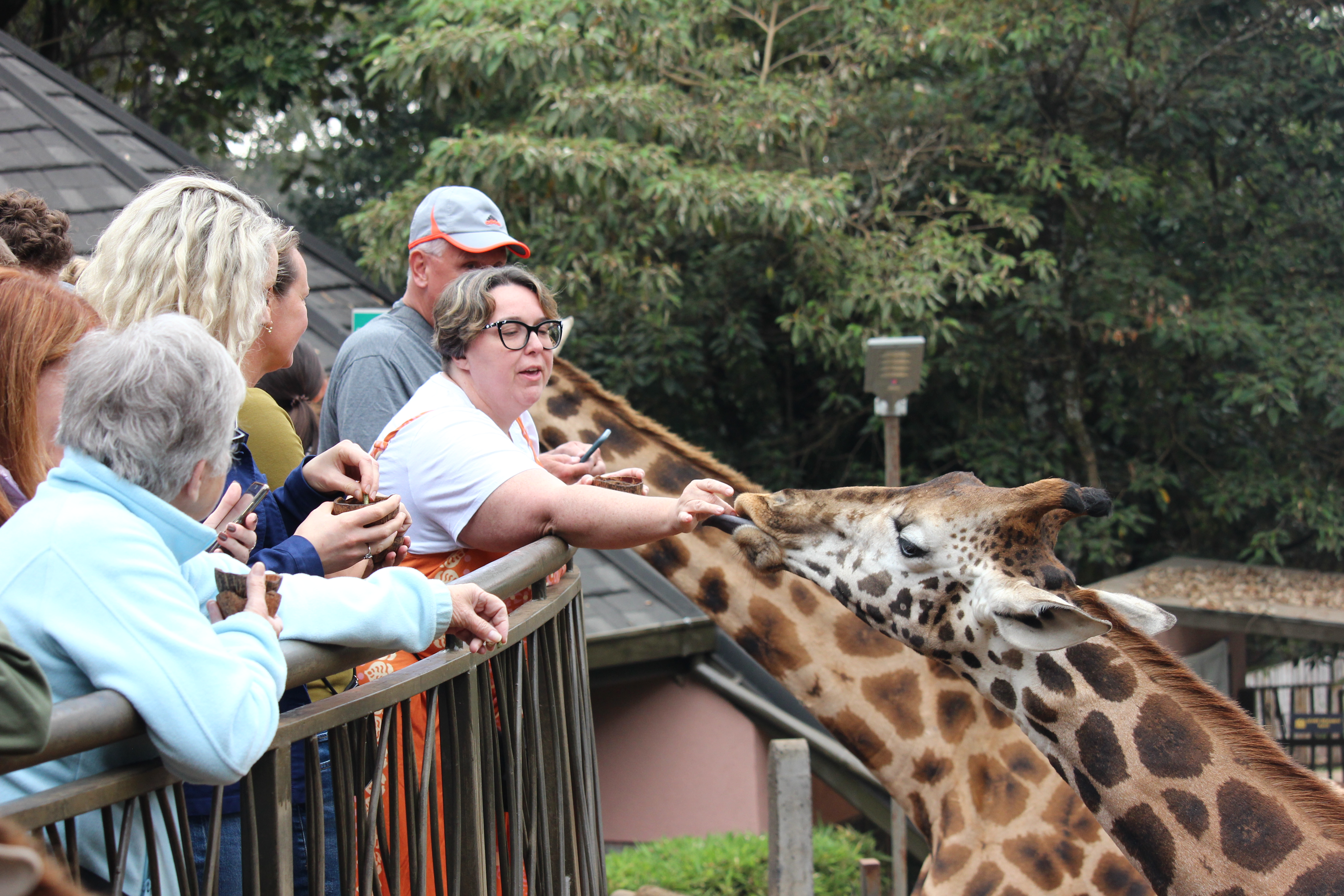
- Visitor feeding a giraffe in 2025
- Interactive map of Giraffe Centre
- 1.37612°S 36.74610°E
- Date opened: 1983
- Location: Langata, Kenya
- Website: www.giraffecentre.org

The Giraffe Centre is a wildlife conservation facility located in Lang'ata, approximately 20 kilometres (12 mi) from the centre of Nairobi, Kenya. It was established to protect the vulnerable Rothschild's giraffe, that is found only in the grasslands of East Africa.

In 1979, the Giraffe Centre, a nature sanctuary for visiting and including wildlife conservation education for urban school children, was started by Jock Leslie Melville, the Kenyan grandson of a Scottish Earl, when he and his wife Betty captured two baby giraffe to start a programme of breeding giraffe on their Lang'ata property, site of the present Centre. Since then the programme has had huge success, resulting in the introduction of several breeding pairs of Rothschild Giraffe into Kenyan national parks.

By 1983 enough money had been raised to establish the Giraffe Visitor Centre as a tourist destination just outside Nairobi.

The main attraction for both school children and visitors is feeding giraffes from a raised observation platform. The Giraffe Centre is also home to several warthogs which freely roam the area along with the giraffes.
