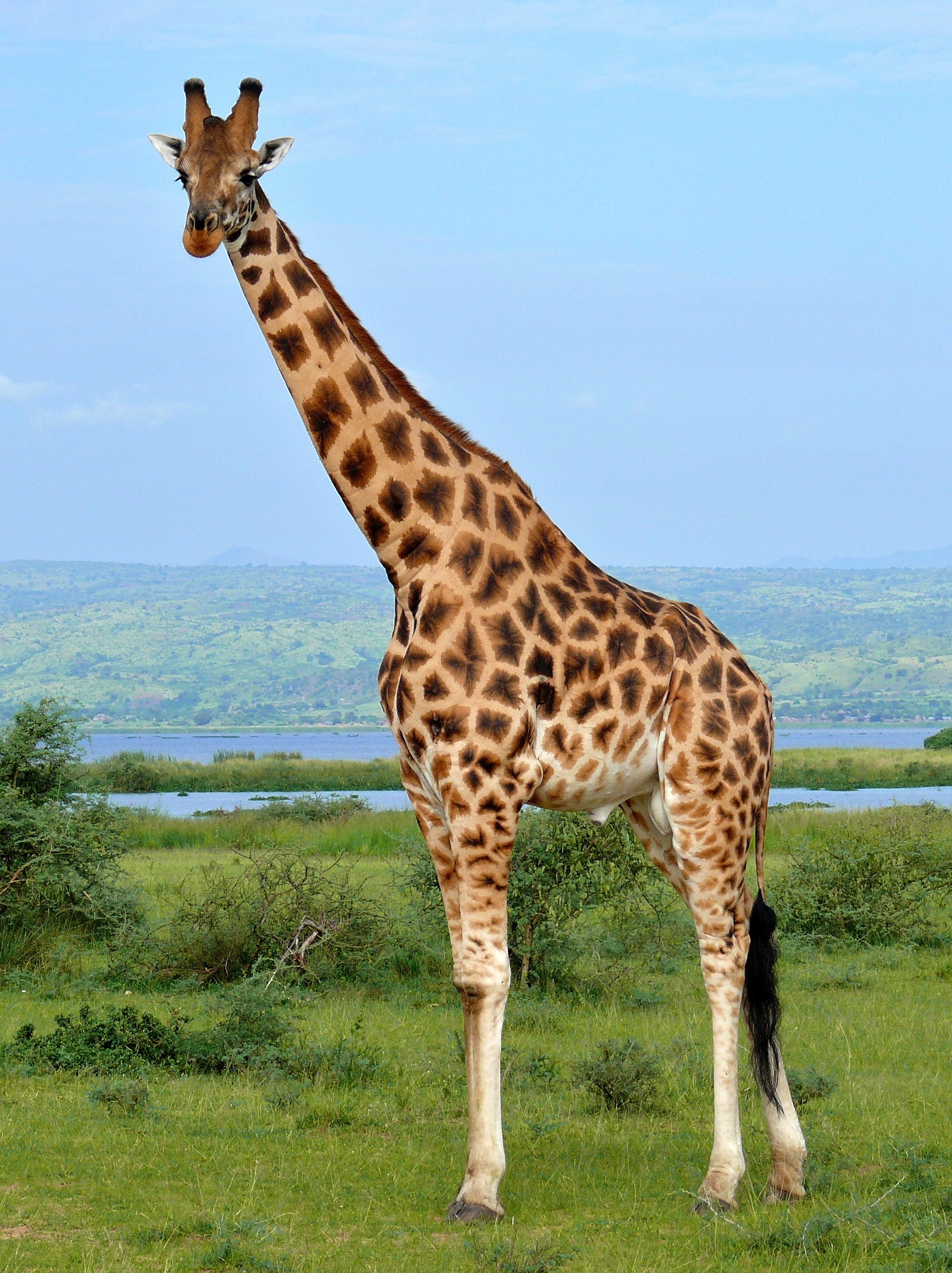
- A male Rothschild's giraffe at Murchison Falls National Park, Uganda

Conservation status
- Near Threatened (IUCN 3.1)

Scientific classification
- Kingdom: Animalia
- Phylum: Chordata
- Class: Mammalia
- Order: Artiodactyla
- Family: Giraffidae
- Genus: Giraffa
- Species: G. camelopardalis
- Subspecies: G. c. rothschildi

Trinomial name
- Giraffa camelopardalis rothschildi Lydekker, 1903
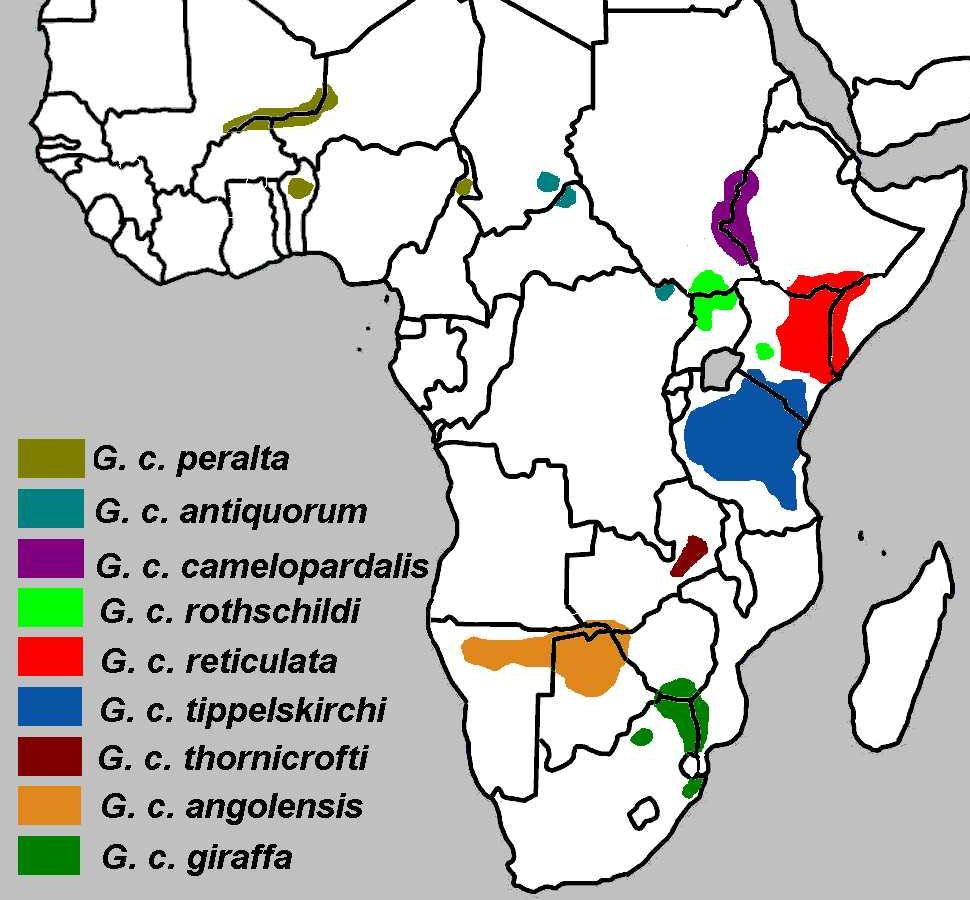
- Rothschild's giraffe's range in light green

Synonyms
- G.c. rothschildi (Lydekker, 1903)

= Rothschild's giraffe =

Population of Giraffe

Rothschild's giraffe (Giraffa camelopardalis rothschildi) is an ecotype of the Nubian giraffe. It is one of the most endangered distinct populations of giraffe, with 1,399 mature individuals estimated in the wild in 2018. The Rothschild's giraffe is one of the most endangered giraffe subspecies with conservation efforts focused in Uganda and Kenya. They are distinguished by their lighter coat color and lack of markings on their lower legs. Conservation efforts of these giraffes mostly take place at the Giraffe Centre in Kenya.

== Taxonomy and evolutionary history ==
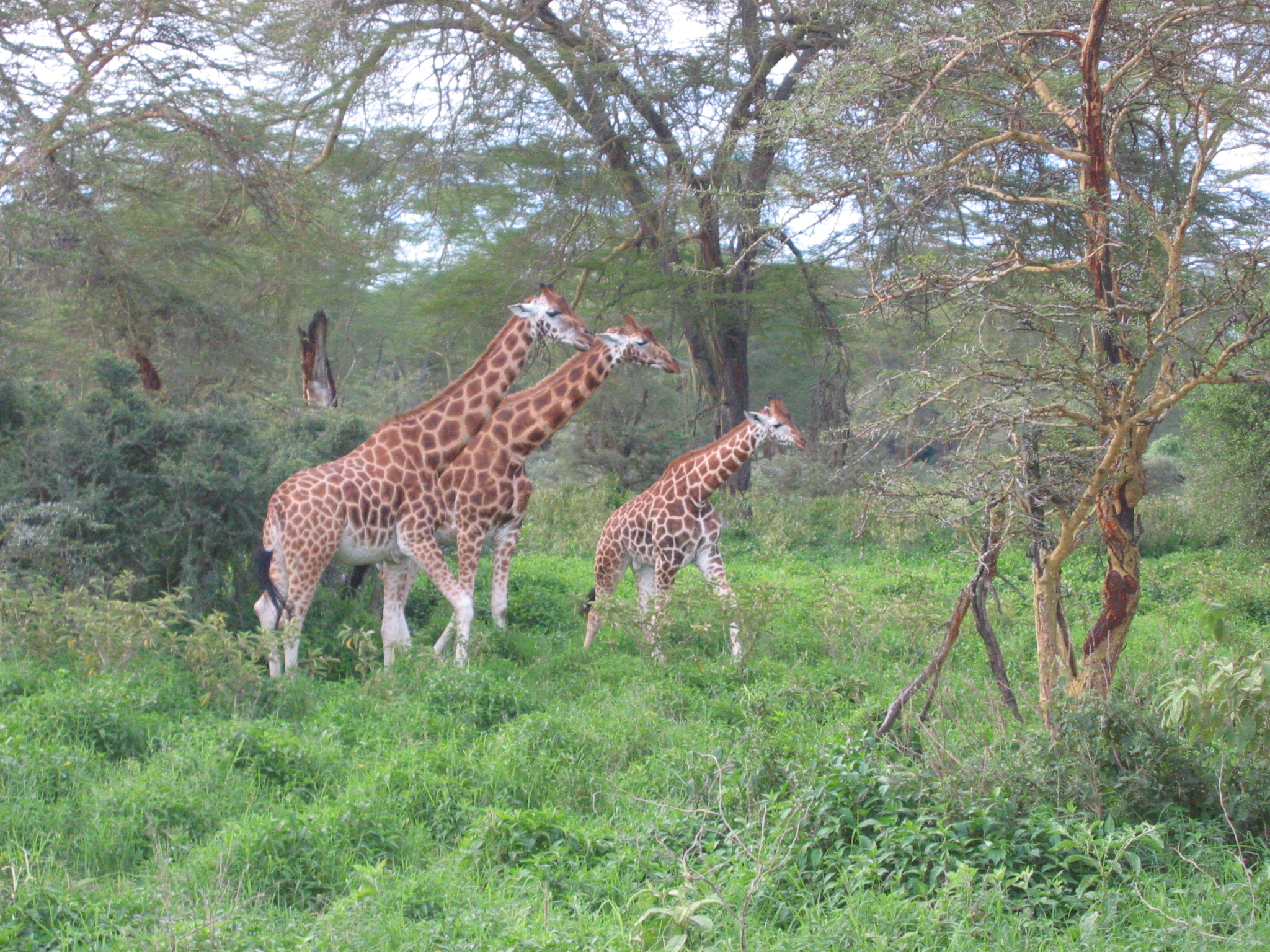
Rothschild's giraffes at Lake Nakuru National Park in Kenya

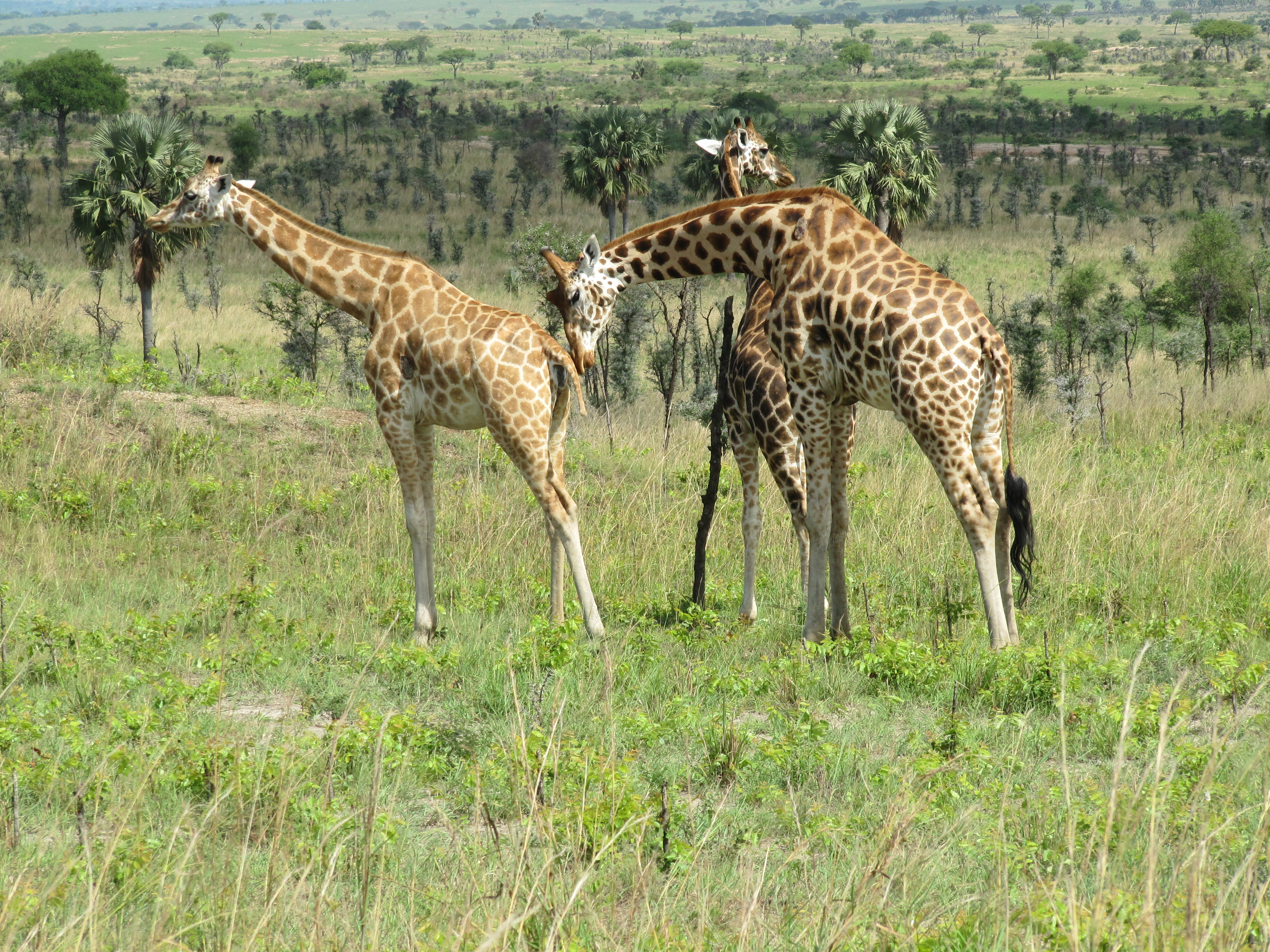
Rothschild's giraffes at Murchison Falls National Park in Uganda

As of August 2025, the IUCN recognizes four species of giraffe with seven subspecies. Giraffa camelopardalis rothschildi is an ecotype of the Nubian giraffe, named after the Tring Museum's founder, Walter Rothschild. It is also known as the Baringo giraffe, after the Lake Baringo area of Kenya, or as the Ugandan giraffe. All of those living in the wild are in protected areas in Kenya and Uganda. In 2007, Rothschild's giraffe was proposed as a separate species from other giraffe. In 2016, Rothschild's giraffe was proposed as conspecific with the Nubian giraffe (elevated to full species), but that taxonomy has not been widely adopted.

== Characteristics ==
The Rothschild's giraffe is easily distinguishable from other subspecies. The most obvious sign is in the coloring of the coat or pelt. Whereas the reticulated giraffe has very clearly defined dark patches with bright-whitish channels between them, Rothschild's giraffe more closely resembles the Masai giraffe. However, when compared to the Masai giraffe, the Rothschild's ecotype is paler, the orange-brown patches are less jagged and sharp in shape, and the connective channel is of a creamier hue compared to that seen on the reticulated giraffe. In addition, Rothschild's giraffe displays no markings on the lower leg, giving it the impression of wearing white stockings.

Another distinguishing feature of Rothschild's giraffe, although harder to spot, is the number of ossicones on the head. This is the only Giraffa phenotype to be born with five ossicones. Two of these are the larger and more obvious ones at the top of the head, which are common to all giraffes. The third ossicone can often be seen in the center of the giraffe's forehead, and the other two are behind each ear. Regarding the hybridization and habitat of the species, the Rothschild’s giraffe has different genetic markers that other species usually do not, which keeps it safe from extinction and hybridization overlap.

The Rothschild’s giraffe is taller than many other subspecies, measuring up to 5.88 m (19.3 ft). It can weigh up to 1,100 kg (2,500 lb). Males are larger than females by a few hundred pounds.

The meat of the Rothschild giraffe is supposedly very sweet and its bones contain a specific type of fat that traditional cultures use as medicinal components.

== Habitat and distribution ==
Isolated populations of Rothschild's giraffes live in savannahs, grasslands, and open woodlands of Uganda and Kenya. They are possibly regionally extinct from South Sudan and northeastern Democratic Republic of the Congo. 60% of the Rothschild's giraffe population is living in Uganda.

== Ecology and behavior ==
Rothschild's giraffes mate at any time of the year and have a gestation period of 14 to 16 months, typically giving birth to a single calf. They live in small herds, with males and females (and their calves) living separately, only mixing for mating. The Rothschild's giraffes are tolerant of other animals around them as long as they don't feel threatened. For the most part, they are very friendly, but the males are known to engage in fights for mating. Since this species can mate all year long, those battles seem to be frequent.

== Threats and conservation efforts ==
As of 2018, Rothschild's giraffe is classified as near threatened. Very few locations are left where Rothschild's giraffe can be seen in the wild, with notable spots being Lake Nakuru National Park in Kenya and Murchison Falls National Park in northern Uganda. Their predators are hyenas, lions, crocodiles, and leopards.

Two dwarf giraffes standing only 2.9 metres (9.5 ft) tall have been spotted in Murchison Falls National Park. Scientists speculate their dwarfism may have been caused by inbreeding due to species decline. Three Rothschild's giraffes were electrocuted by low-hanging power lines in Soysambu conservancy in Nakuru, Kenya.

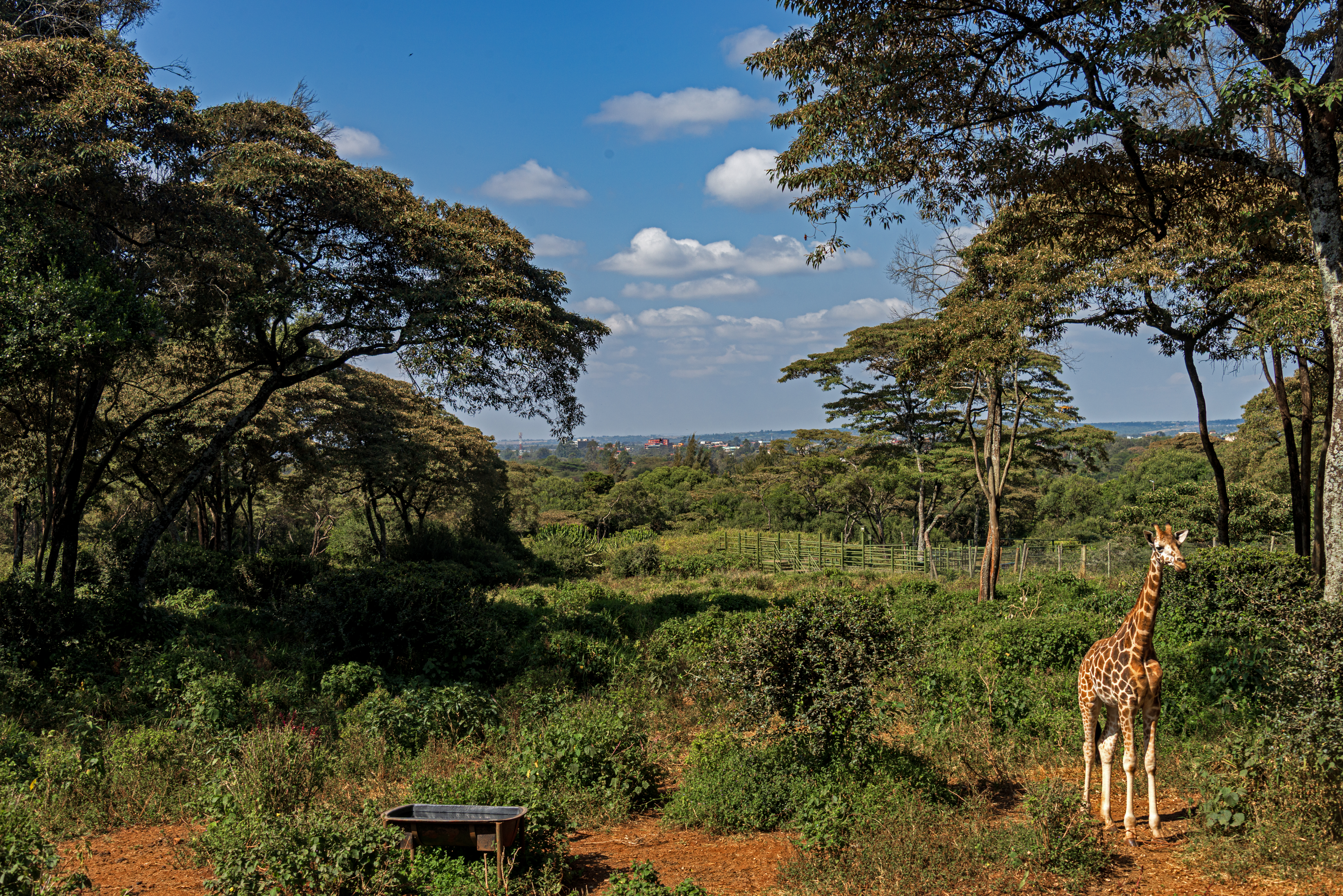
The Giraffe Centre, in Nairobi

Various captive breeding programmes are in place – most notably at the Giraffe Centre in Nairobi, Kenya – which aim to expand the gene pool in the wild population of Rothschild's giraffe. As of January 2011, more than 450 are kept in International Species Information System (ISIS) registered zoos (which does not include the Nairobi Giraffe Centre), making both it and the reticulated giraffe the most commonly kept phenotypes of Giraffa. Breeding these giraffes are one of the large attempts to protect this species. Giraffe Centre, a conservation centre dedicated to protecting and expanding this giraffe population, releases these giraffes into the wild when they are approximately two to three years old. They are only released into the wild when they are thought to be independent enough to survive on their own. This center has released over 40 giraffes into the wild.
