= Ambam (gorilla) =

Male gorilla (1990–2022)

Ambam (14 April 1990 – 1 October 2022) was a male western lowland gorilla who gained notoriety in a 2011 viral video for walking upright at Port Lympne Wild Animal Park in Kent, England. Brief, occasional, and short spurts of bipedalism among primates is well known, but longer periods of sustained walking demonstrated by Ambam is considered rare by experts.

Ambam is one of two famous gorillas, along with Louis, known for their unusual upright walking behavior. Scientists suggest that the ability of gorillas to walk upright for extended periods of time might be caused by their need to gather and carry food with their hands, a behavior also observed in chimpanzees, which could help explain the evolution of bipedalism in humans.

== Life ==
Ambam was born on 14 April 1990, to mother Shamba and father Bitam in Bekesbourne, at the Howletts Wild Animal Park. In his first few months, Ambam was hand-reared. Following an illness, he was separated from his mother while he recovered. Just before his seventh birthday, he was moved to Port Lympne Wild Animal Park in March 1997. When he became a mature adult male gorilla (known as a silverback), he was the largest gorilla of his bachelor herd at Port Lympne, weighing 220 kilograms and standing at 6 ft 0 in (1.83 m).

External media

Images
- Ambam (close up)
- Ambam (standing)

Video
- Gorilla Walks Like A Man! (2011)
- Gorilla Walks Like A Man - Part 2 (2011)

In January 2011, animal researcher Johanna Watson posted an eighteen-second YouTube video of Ambam walking upright; it included a snippet of "Walk Like a Man" by the Four Seasons. The video went viral, amassing more than five million views. The video was featured on the television programme Rude Tube.

Upright walking for very short periods among primates like bonobos, chimpanzees and gorillas is well known. But longer periods of sustained bipedalism like those demonstrated by Ambam were previously considered rare. Wild chimpanzees in the Bossou Hills Reserve, for example, are known to walk upright while collecting and carrying nuts.

Zookeepers deduced that Ambam walked upright in order to hold more food, see over his enclosure walls and know when food was coming, and to keep his hands dry in wet conditions. He was not taught to walk upright, and was assumed to have copied zookeepers. Upright walking behaviour was observed in other members of Ambam's family, including his father, sister, half-sister and nephew. The other gorillas in his enclosure were uninterested in his upright walking and did not replicate it. Ambam was documented walking upright more often than other gorillas.

In 2018, Louis, a western lowland gorilla at the Philadelphia Zoo, was found engaging in the same extended upright walking behavior as Ambam. It is believed that like Ambam, Louis walks upright to help collect and carry food. Similar to Ambam, who likes to keep his hands dry, Louis is unusually fastidious, and may also walk upright to keep his hands clean and free from mud. Scientists believe that gorillas will forgo knuckle-walking to use their hands for gathering food, which may help explain the evolution of bipedalism in humans.

Ambam died on 1 October 2022, aged 32, at Port Lympne, of a heart attack. He had approximately 25 siblings, but no offspring.

== Influence ==
To prepare for the role of Caesar, a fictional chimpanzee in the film Rise of the Planet of the Apes (2011), actor Andy Serkis spent long periods watching footage of Ambam and a western lowland gorilla at the Campo Gorilla Reserve in the Los Angeles Zoo.

== See also ==
- List of individual apes
