= Damian Aspinall =

English businessman and conservationist

- Born: John Damian Androcles Aspinall; 24 May 1960 (age 66)
- Education: Millfield
- Occupations: Businessman and conservationist
- Known for: Chairman of The Aspinall Foundation
- Notable work: Raising and releasing zoo-bred lowland gorillas
- Spouses: Louise Sebag-Montefiore (m. 1987; div. 2002); Victoria Fisher (m. 2016)
- Partner: Donna Air (2000–2007)
- Children: 3
- Father: John Victor Aspinall

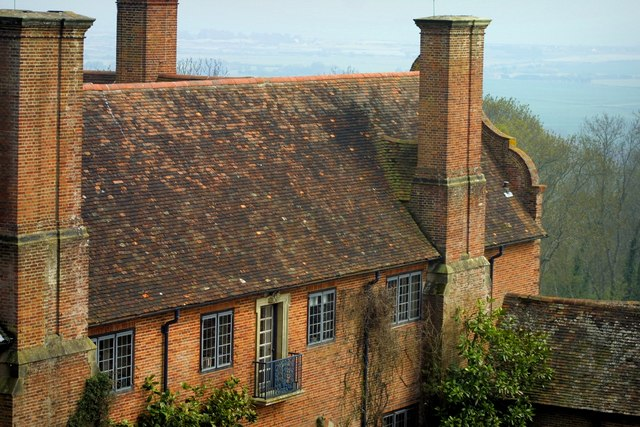
Mansion at Port Lympne designed by Herbert Baker

John Damian Androcles Aspinall (born 24 May 1960) is an English businessman and conservationist. He is the chairman of The Aspinall Foundation, founded by his father, which has raised and released several zoo-bred lowland gorillas in Gabon. He manages Howletts Wild Animal Park and Port Lympne Wild Animal Park.

== Early life ==
Aspinall is the son of Jane Gordon Hastings (died 2001), a Scottish model, and John Victor Aspinall (1926–2000), a casino and zoo owner, founder of Crown London Aspinalls, conservationist, and the stepson of Sir George Francis Osborne, 16th Baronet.

When he was six years old, in 1966, Aspinall's parents went through a bitter divorce as a result of adultery by his mother. His father won custody and immediately sent him to Millfield, a boarding school in Street, Somerset. Partially as a result of the direction of his father, Aspinall never saw his mother again.

In 1972, Aspinall's father married Lady Sarah Maguerite ('Sally') Aspinall (née Curzon) (1945-2025). She was the widow of the racing driver Piers Courage and daughter of Francis Curzon, 5th Earl Howe.

At age 16, Aspinall left school to travel the world and taught himself to play the guitar.

== Business career ==
At age 20, Aspinall traveled to Australia, where he became the country's best-selling encyclopaedia salesman.

In the 1980s, he returned to the UK and bought investment property. He sold his investment properties in the late 1980s, before the early 1990s recession.

After his father's death in 2000, Aspinall was left very little of the family fortune. However, he and Australian associate James Packer, son of Kerry Packer, bought Crown London Aspinalls from his father's estate.

In 2001, he expanded his casino investments with a £44 million reverse takeover of another casino company.

During the COVID-19 pandemic, his casino business received £10.7 million in government support; however, it continued to realize losses after the pandemic ended.

Aspinall resigned from the board of directors of the casino group and gave up his interest in 2023.

== Personal life ==
=== Net worth ===
In 2012, Aspinall's net worth was estimated at £42 million. In 2018, it was estimated at £200 million.

=== Politics ===
Aspinall is a donor to the Tories. He supported Brexit. In 1997, he supported James Goldsmith's Referendum Party.

=== Relationships and children ===
Aspinall has said he has been adverse to marriage since in his opinion, divorce laws favor women such that rich men should not marry. Aspinall was married to Louise Elizabeth Julia Sebag-Montefiore for 15 years, from July 1987 to 2002. Louise is the mother of Aspinall's 2 eldest daughters, Tansy (born 1989) and Clary (born 1992). The divorce was a result of Aspinall's adultery with Kirsty Bertarelli. Towards the end of that relationship, he also dated Erica Packer. He continued to support his ex-wife after their divorce. From 2001 to 2007, he dated Donna Air, the mother of his third daughter, Freya (born September 2003). Freya is a model and Internet celebrity who left school at 16 to join her father at The Aspinall Foundation with the goal of eventually being chairperson. All three daughters are involved in conservation. From 2008 to 2009, he dated Elle Macpherson. He also dated Naomi Campbell.

=== Music ===
Aspinall co-wrote "Don't Worry", a song recorded by Appleton.

== See also ==
- List of conservationists
- List of people educated at Millfield
