= Al Marjan Island =

Island in the United Arab Emirates

Coordinates: 25°40′52″N 55°44′42″E

Al Marjan Island جزيرة المرجان
- Community
- Al Marjan Island
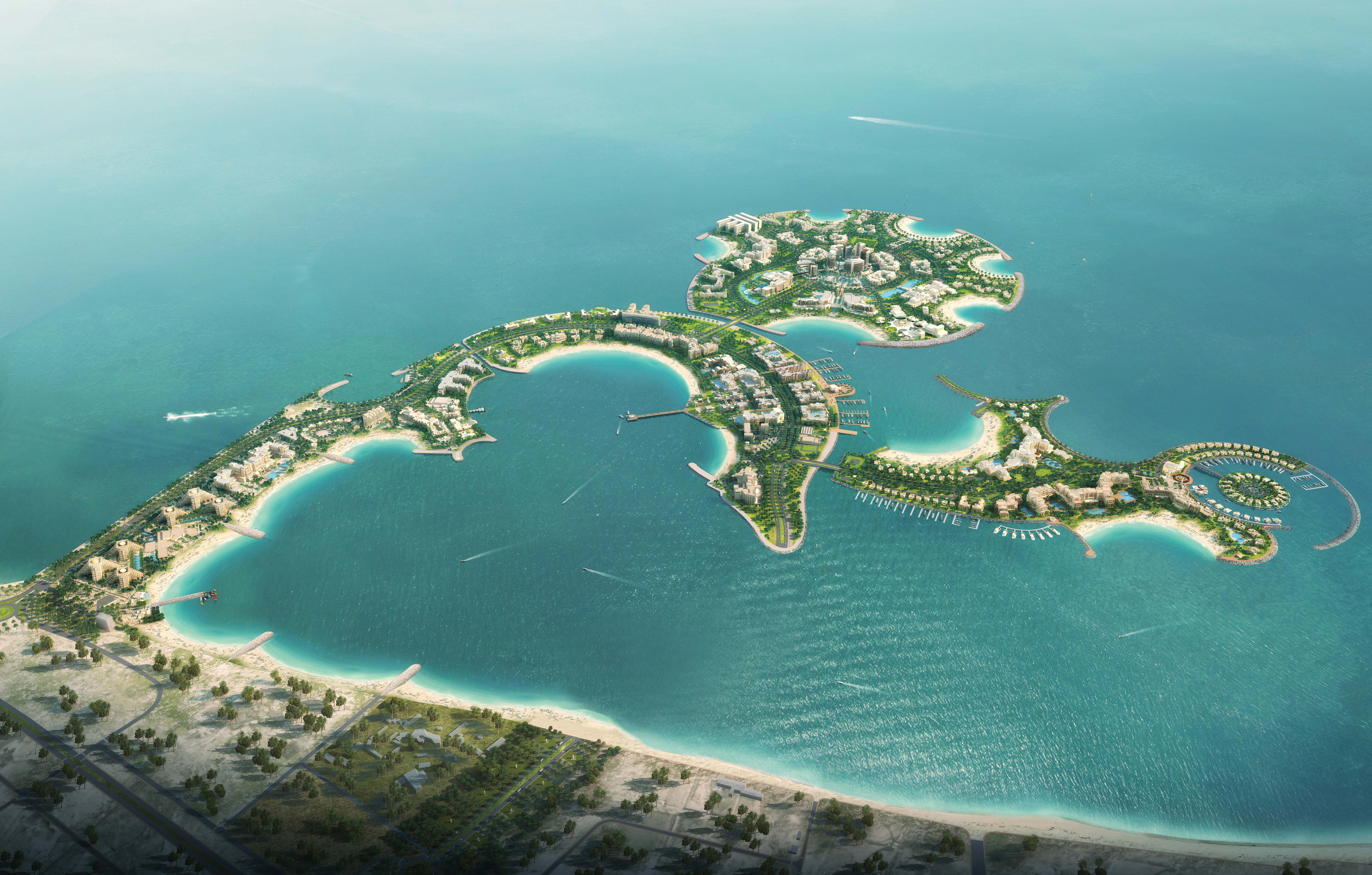
- Planned view of the Island
- Interactive map of Al Marjan Island
- Country: United Arab Emirates
- Emirate: Emirate of Ras Al Khaimah
- City: Ras Al Khaimah
- Established: 2013

Population (2023)
  - Total: 7,857
- Website: https://almarjanisland.com/

Al Marjan Island is a group of 4 coral-shaped islands in a man-made archipelago located in Al Jazirah Al Hamra, Emirate of Ras Al Khaimah, in the Persian Gulf. It is administered by the Al Marjan Island Company. Several resorts, beaches, tourism destinations and residential projects are located in the four islands, being one of the United Arab Emirates's top tourism spots.

== History ==
Started as a tourism enterprise, the five-year construction development started in 2013.

Although still under development, at full operation, it is expected to host up to 20 thousand people in hotels and other facilities, with an estimated foreign investment starting at Dh19 billion. The Island now houses 45% of the total 5-star hotel rooms in the Emirate through its 3 resorts - the Rixos Bab Al Bahr, DoubleTree by Hilton Resort & Spa Marjan Island, and Al Marjan Island Hotel & Spa; capacity will exceed 10 thousand rooms by 2017 in the Emirate, half of it in the Island.

The area received over 100 thousand visitors during 2013. While more than 100 thousand foreigners visited the Island during 2014, 23% of the total number of visitors during the first quarter of 2013 were UAE nationals. The tourism industry is diversifying due to the slump in Russian inward tourism; the Ras Al Khaimah Tourism Development Authority is now looking towards Eastern Europe and the UK to prop up its numbers, with tourism expected to generate approximately 20% of the Emirate's GDP.

A project to build a soccer-themed resort sponsored by Real Madrid in the Island was scrapped in late 2013 due to lack of funding. The RAK government, however, is in talks to reformulate that investment with the help of other investors.

Wynn Al Marjan Island will be an integrated resort developed by Wynn Resorts which will open in 2027. It will feature the first casino in the UAE.

== Geography ==
The island group consists of Breeze Island, Treasure Island, Dream Island and View Island. It extends 4.5 kilometres (2.8 mi) into the sea and covers an area of 2,700,000 square metres (29,000,000 sq ft)

- Breeze Island has several hotels and 2,000 metres (6,600 ft) of waterfront with a promenade.
- Treasure Island is a prominently residential area, built on 760,000 metres (2,500,000 ft).
- Dream Island is an extensive beach area, with several hotels and clubs located on its shores. It possesses 5,000 metres (16,000 ft) of waterfront area.
- View Island is the 460,000 square metres (5,000,000 sq ft) central section of the island group, representing its residential and hospitality urban core.

== Gallery ==
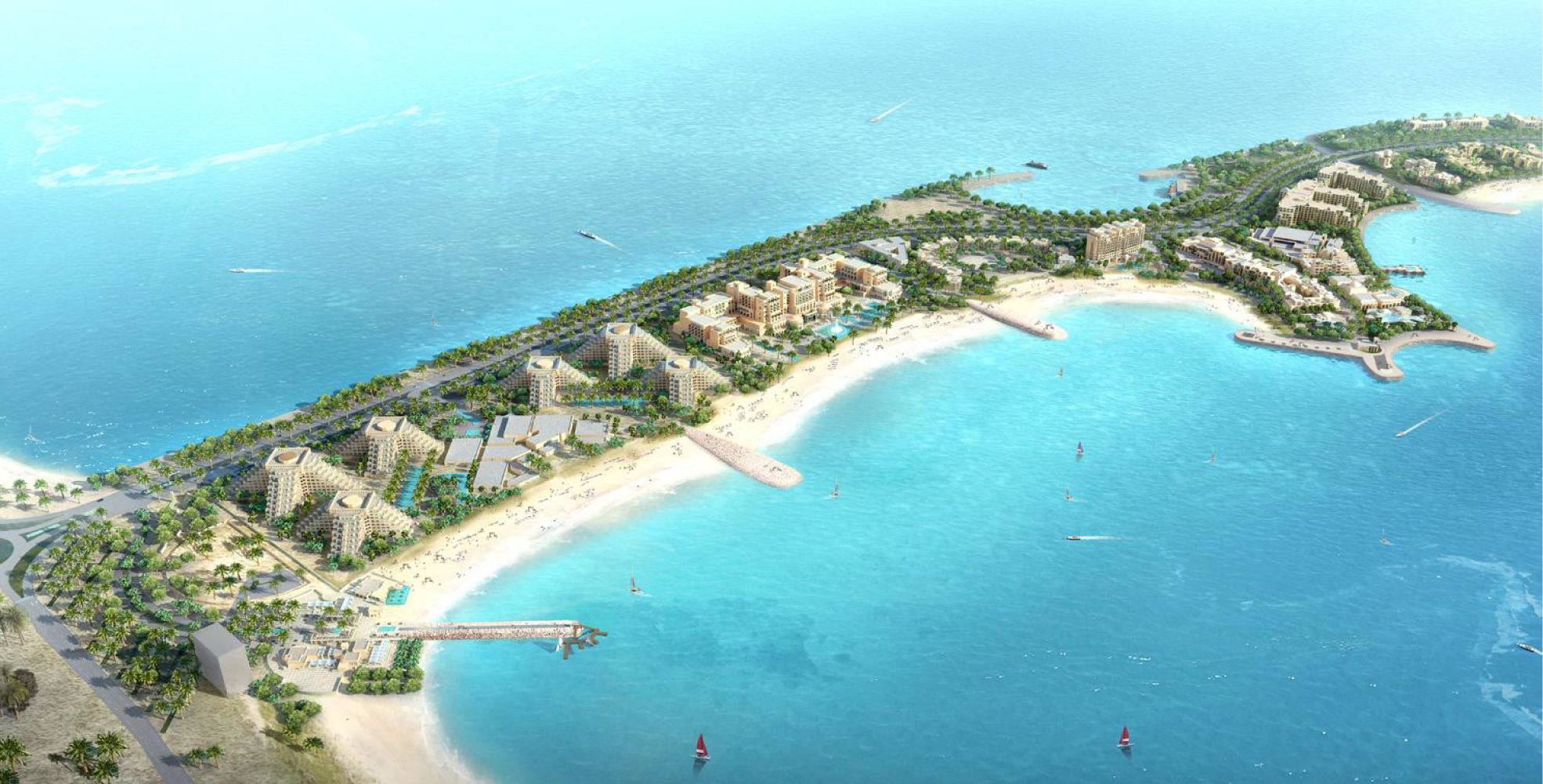
Breeze island

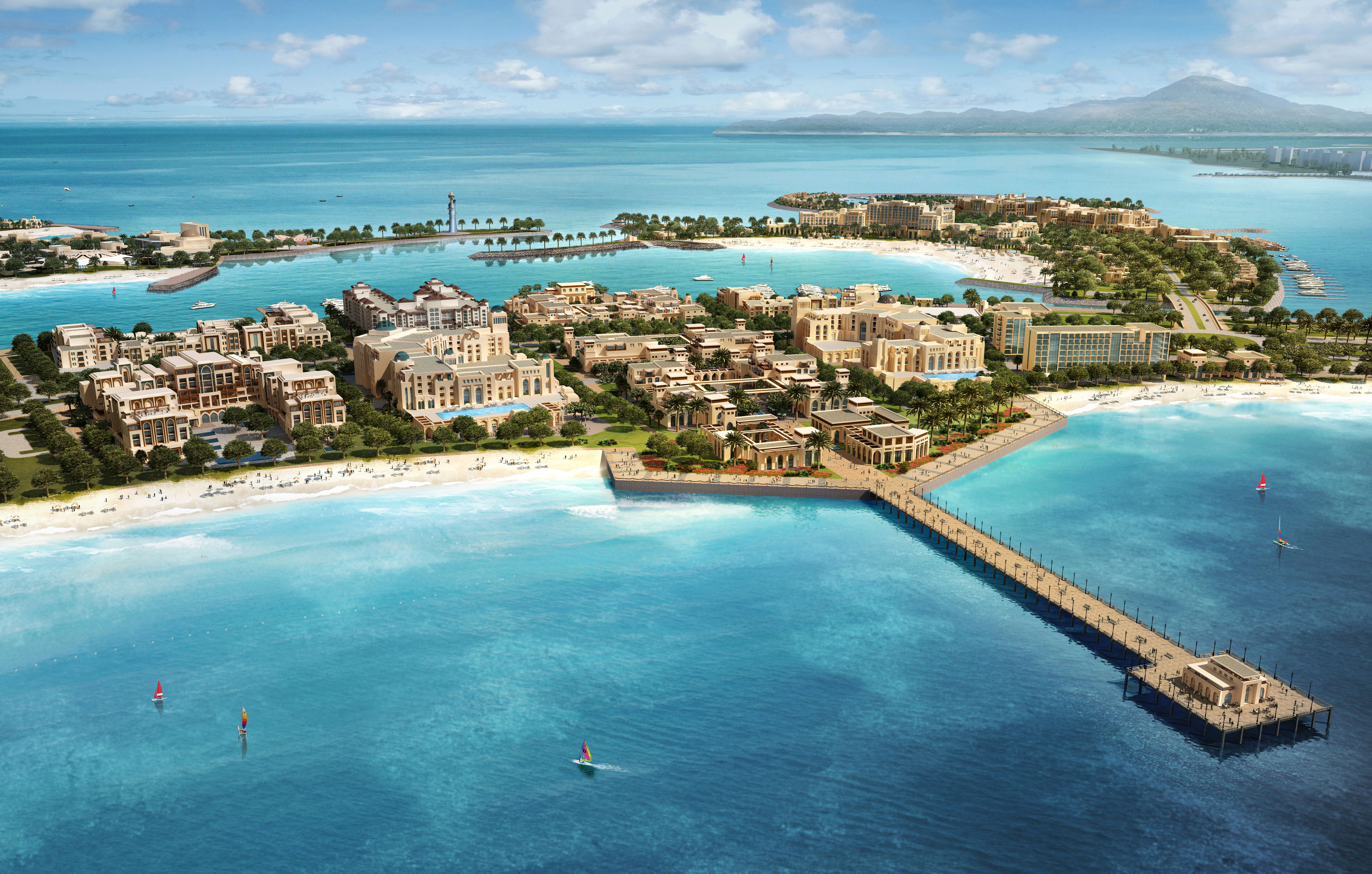
Treasure island

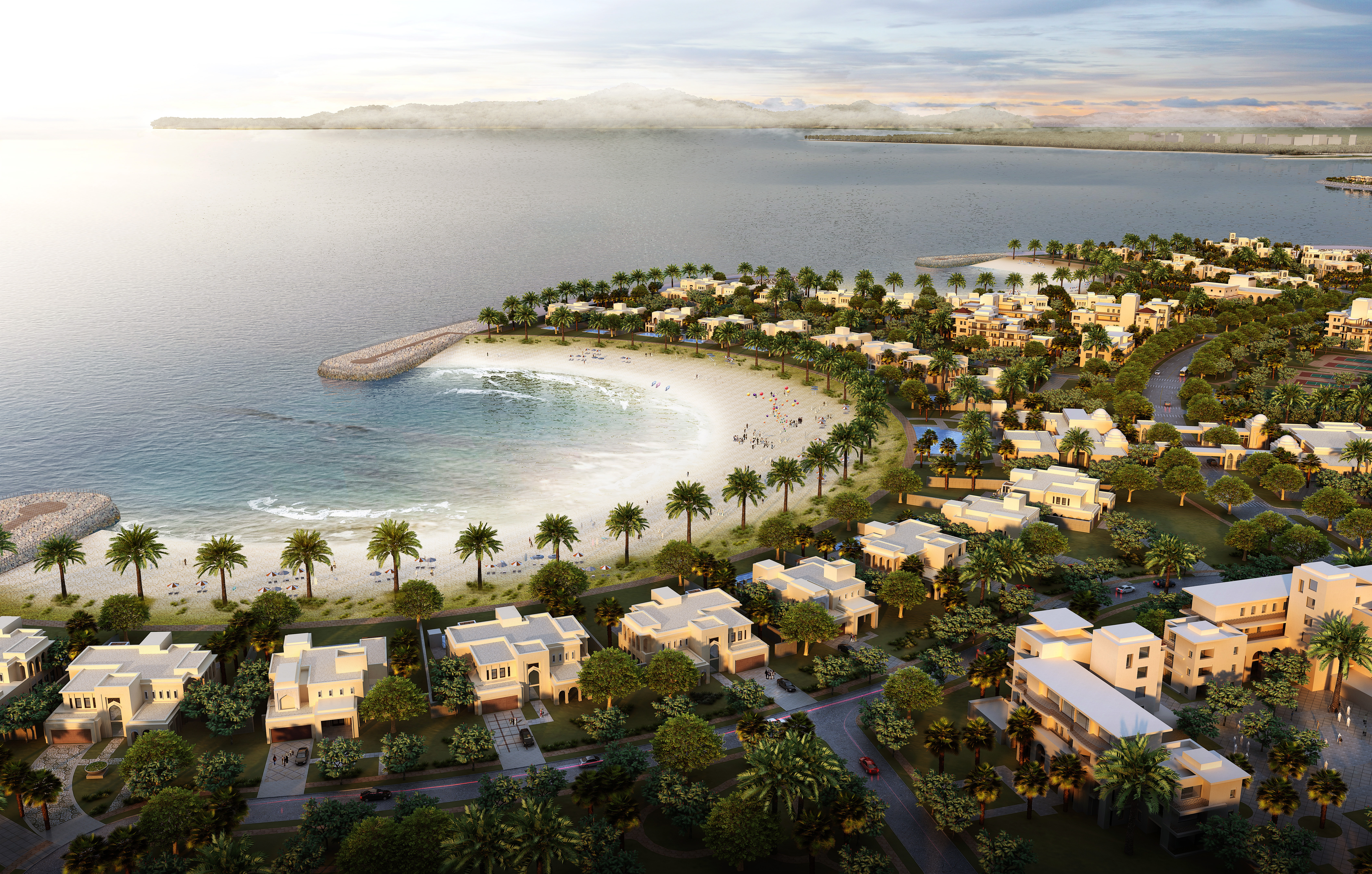
View island

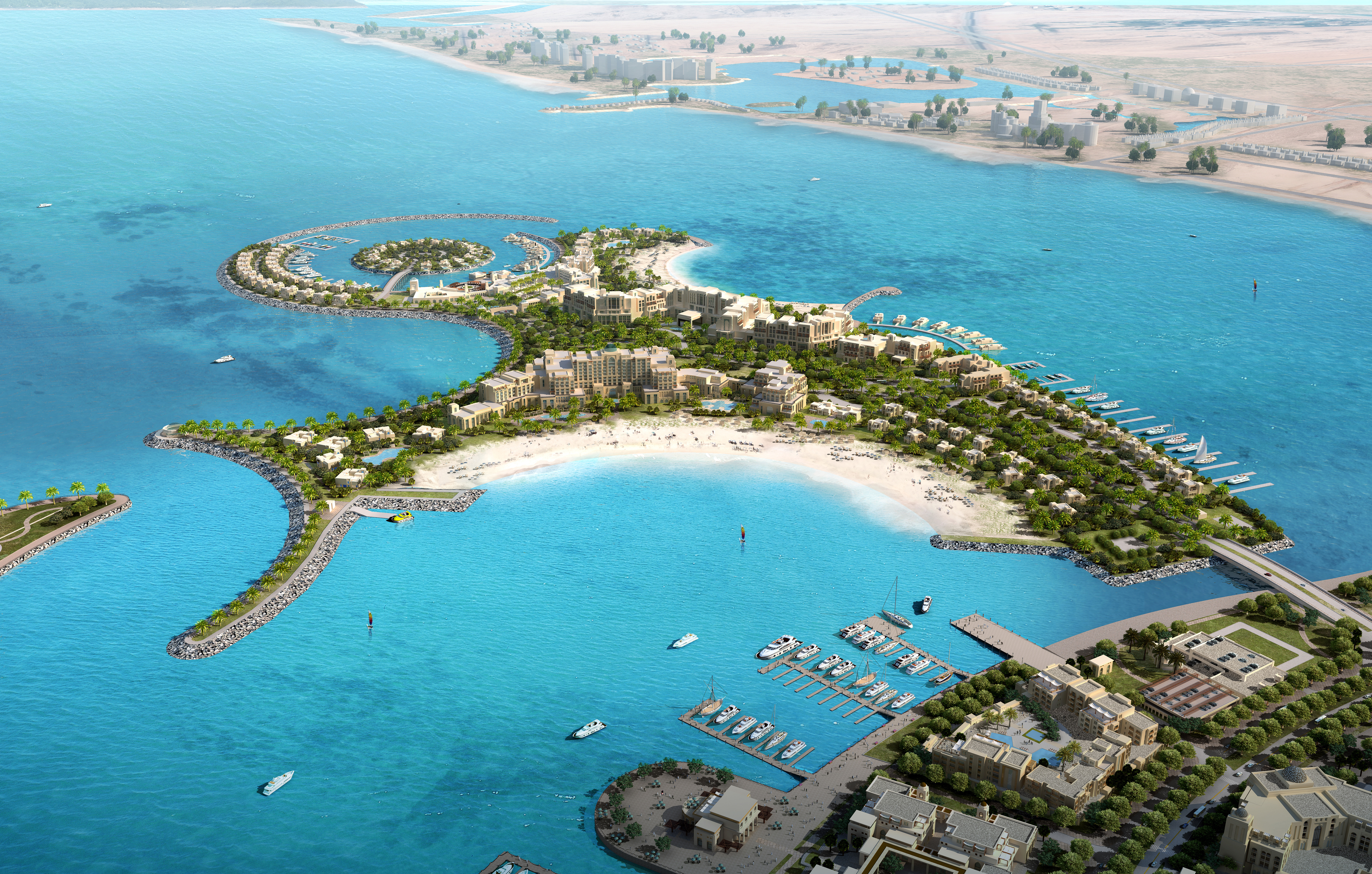
Dream Island
