= Port Lympne Wild Animal Park =

Coordinates: 51°4′34″N 0°59′58″E

Port Lympne Hotel & Reserve
- Interactive map of Port Lympne Hotel & Reserve
- Date opened: 1976
- Location: Lympne, Kent, England (South Kent)
- Land area: 600 acres (240 ha)
- No. of animals: 650+
- No. of species: 50+

Port Lympne Hotel & Reserve near the town of Hythe, Kent, England is set in 600 acres (242.8 ha) and incorporates the historic Port Lympne Mansion, and landscaped gardens designed by architect Sir Herbert Baker, for Sir Philip Sassoon.

The estate with an Edwardian mansion near Lympne was purchased in 1973 by John Aspinall; the intent was to solve lack of space at the nearby Howletts Wild Animal Park. It was opened to the public in 1976. Since 1984 the animal parks have been owned by a charity (The John Aspinall Foundation, currently led by Damian Aspinall). The collection is known for being unorthodox, for the encouragement of close personal relationships between staff and animals, and for their breeding of rare and endangered species. The park now includes tigers, lions, leopards, gorillas, bears, giraffes and the UK's largest herd of black rhinos. The facility also plans to release some of the animals into the wild.

Royalty and many other famous people have stayed at the mansion at the centre of the park. The rooms are lavishly decorated and the landscaped gardens have views of Romney Marsh. Other accommodations are also provided in the Park, some in Lion Lodge, Tiger Lodge, Bear Lodge (glamping), Rhino Lodge, Treehouse Hotel, The Bubble, Hogdeer Creek, Giraffe Cottage, Giraffe Lodge (glamping), Pinewood (glamping), Wolf Lodge and Forest Hideaway. The latest accommodation options are Lion Lodge and the 20-bedroom Giraffe Hall.

== The Dinosaur Forest ==
Opened in 2016 to coincide with the park's 40th birthday, the Dinosaur Forest spans three acres of ancient woodland, and features over 100 life sized and anatomically correct models. Rangers discuss the animal kingdom of millions of years ago. Visitors are invited to dig for fossils and try the "create your own dinosaur" activity.

== Animal collection ==
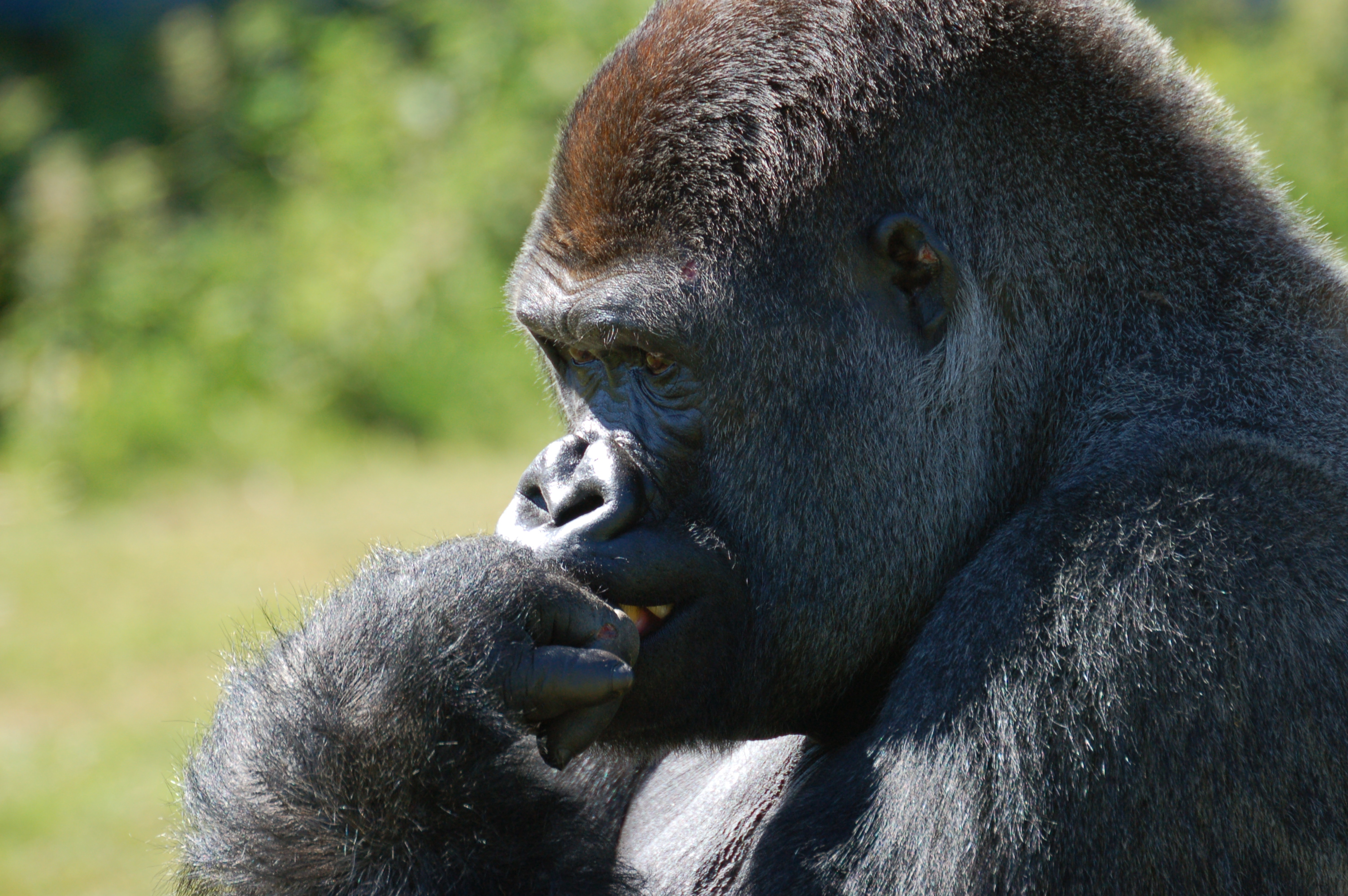
Gorilla at Port Lympne Reserve

Port Lympne houses many rare and endangered species and the largest breeding herd of black rhinos in the UK. There are small cats, monkeys, tapirs, lions, painted dogs and many more, some of which are on the circular walk. The zoo has an 'African Experience' safari trail where visitors are transported on specially modified vehicles around the park to view giraffe, zebra, antelope and wildebeest.

In 2000, a 27-year-old keeper was killed whilst working in the stall of a female Indian elephant called La Petite.

In 2015, the Park moved its herd of Asian elephants following numerous deaths amongst them related to a persistent outbreak of a strain of herpes virus found in captive elephant populations. In 2005, after many years of stillbirths, two infant mortalities, and several premature adult fatalities, the first surviving mother-reared calf, Sittang, succumbed to the virus. This incident occurred one month after an adult female produced a stillborn calf and also perished. Port Lympne's remaining calf, May Tagu, who was born in April 2005, was transferred to Antwerp Zoo following the spate of deaths, along with her mother and one other cow. The remaining adults were moved to Terra Natura in Benidorm, Spain, where many other former Port Lympne elephants reside. This move has allowed the park to focus on its breeding African elephants. Three cows have been moved from Howletts Wild Animal Park, followed soon after by a bull named Kruger from Knowsley Safari Park. Howletts is home to the UK's largest herd of African elephants. In 2022 Port Lympne became the only zoo in Europe to house 3 species of rhino including the Black Rhino, White Rhino and Indian Rhino.

== Introducing captive animals into the wild ==
According to a U.S. report, Damian Aspinall had purchased about a million acres in Africa and turned the area into a park in an attempt to protect gorillas whose numbers have been declining due to the loss of habitat and poaching. The Foundation's website however, clarifies this: "The Aspinall Foundation is working with the governments of the Congo-Brazzaville and the neighbouring state of Gabon to protect around one million acres within the unique savannah ecosystem of the Batéké Plateau. ... We have reintroduced over 60 gorillas back into the wild, including 22 who travelled from our Parks in Kent". In a 2016 interview, Aspinall added that "we've reintroduced eight black rhinos into the wild" presumably, all born in Kent.

A BBC report in 2014 stated that the Foundation managed two gorilla rescue and rehabilitation projects in Gabon and Republic of the Congo, respectively. A subsequent report stated that five of ten of the gorillas released in 2014 had been found dead soon after, possibly due to attacks by other gorillas.

Tara Stoinski of the Dian Fossey Gorilla Fund International made this comment on the television programme 60 Minutes (aired 15 March 2015): "I think that humans have a very romantic notion of what the wild is like, and the wild is not a place where it is safe, and animals get to roam free and make choices". She wonders about the value of sending zoo-born animals to Africa and believes that it would be wiser for Aspinall to use his funds to save gorillas already in the wild.

In a 2016 interview, Aspinall blamed one gorilla that the Foundation had released for killing the five others. He also complained about the negative publicity about the event. "What about the 60 we released that survived? There's no glory if you get it right. We get no press, no publicity – but boy, if anything goes wrong, they jump on you."

The Park has also introduced other animals into the wild. However, a black rhino (called Zambezi), that was born and raised at the Park, died while being flown to Tanzania in June 2019. The rhino was part of a plan to repopulate the Serengeti.

In 2022, the Aspinall Foundation announced that 13 elephants, born in captivity, would be returned to Africa, for release in the wilds of Kenya. Some experts questioned the wisdom of this strategy, citing issues such as the stress caused by "a hazardous journey", low temperatures at night in Africa, as well as "unfamiliar surroundings, foraging for food, predators and illness". Some concern was also expressed about water quality and the risk of conflict with the human population. The Foundation replied with a statement that it "has a 30-year history of successful rewilding projects around the globe".

== Animal enclosures ==
The park is split into two sections; one allows visitors to walk around (or use golf buggies) to view animals in enclosures, such as primates and carnivores like big cats. The other is a safari park toured in open-sided trucks, divided into South American, Asian and African safari sections. Nearly 90 different species of animals are kept at the 600 acres (240 hectares) Park.

=== Palace of the Apes ===
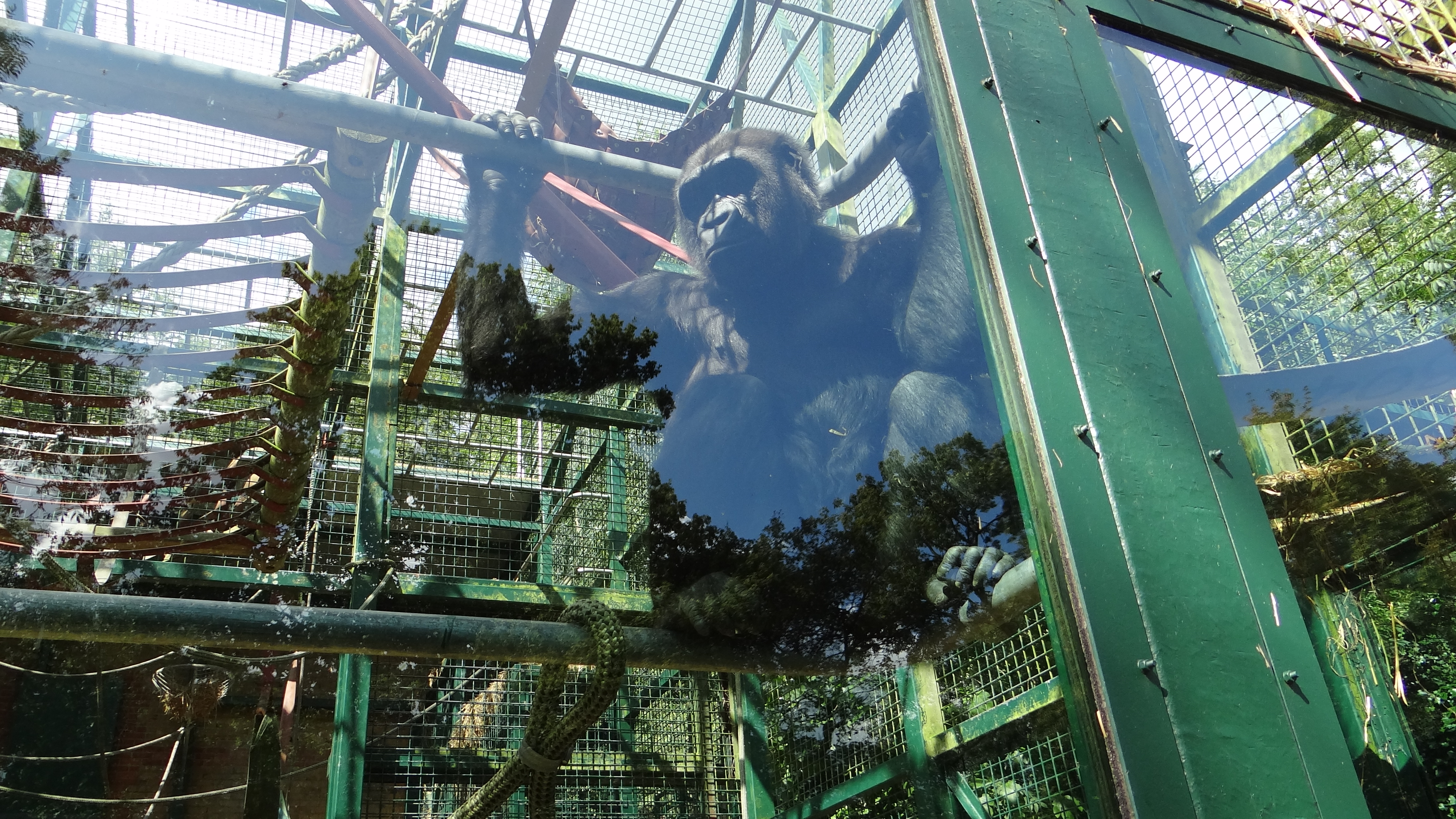
Gorilla at Palace of the Apes

Palace of the Apes is the world's largest gorillarium, housing a large breeding troop. In late 2018, the Park announced the death of Britain's oldest gorilla, Babydoll, who died at age 57. At the time, a news report stated that Damian Aspinall, "whose father John created the Aspinall's casino empire, has dedicated his life to gorilla conservation".

- Western lowland gorilla
- Black-and-white ruffed lemur
- Black howler monkey
- De Brazza's monkey
- Drill
- Dusky leaf monkey
- Greater bamboo lemur
- Silvery gibbon
- Tufted capuchin
- Western lesser bamboo lemur
- Mongoose lemur
- Verreaux's sifaka
- Pygmy marmoset
- East Javan langur
- Diana monkey
- Golden-bellied mangabey

=== Africa ===
- Rothschild's giraffe
- Chapman's zebra
- Eastern black rhinoceros
- Defassa waterbuck
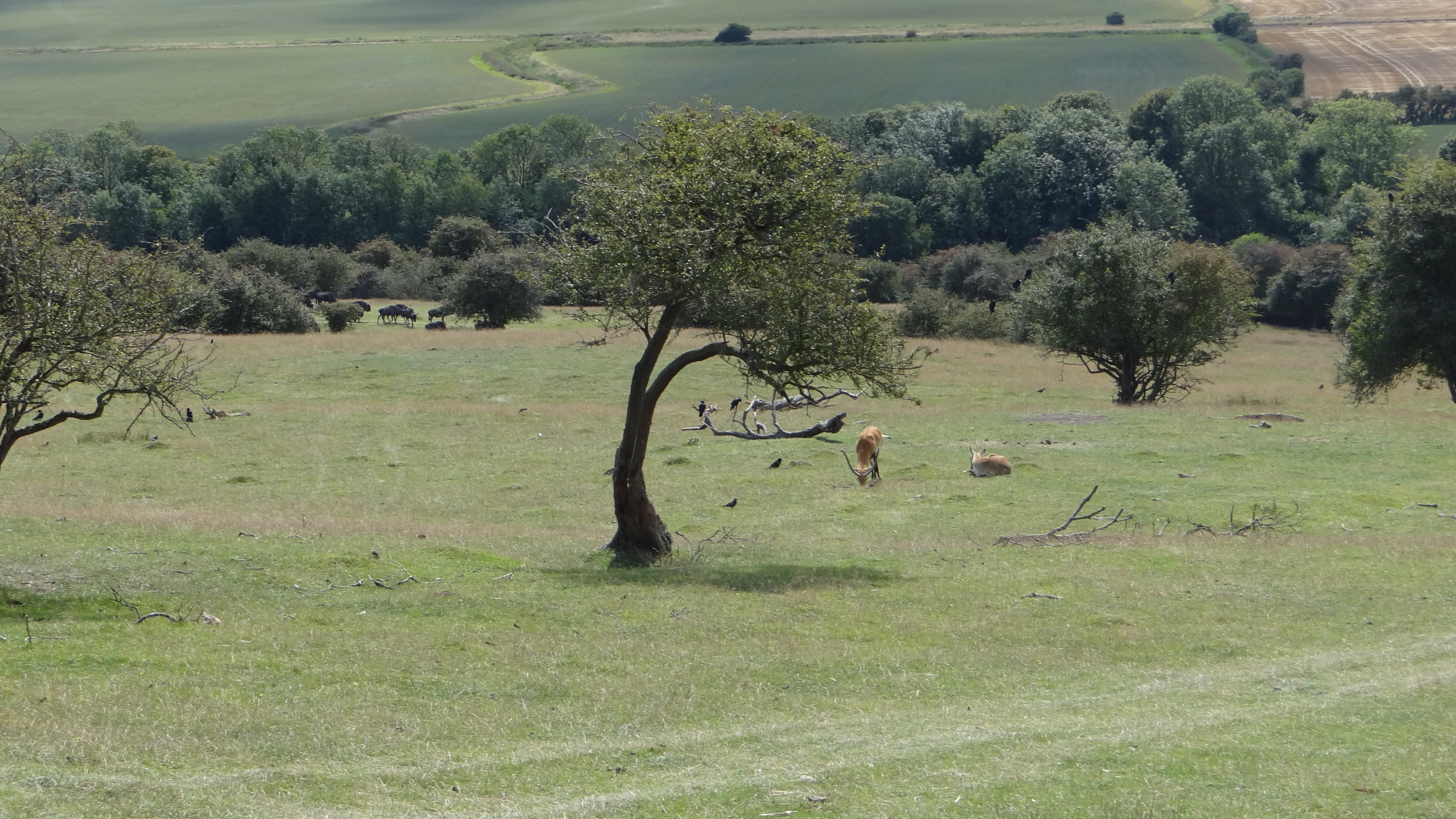
  View of The African Experience
- Guinea baboon
- African wild dog
- Barbary lion
- Roan antelope
- Common ostrich
- Blesbok
- Blue wildebeest
- Lechwe
- Common eland
- Red river hog
- Mantled guereza
- Meerkat
- Serval
- Southern White Rhino

=== Asia ===
- Mishmi takin
- Indian hog deer
- Axis deer
- Water buffalo
- Bactrian camel
- Blackbuck
- Barasingha
- Père David's deer
- Przewalski's horse
- Sambar deer
- Malayan tapir
- Siberian tiger
- Binturong
- Fishing cat
- Pallas's cat
- Red panda
- Rusty-spotted cat
- Indian rhinoceros

=== South America ===
- Spectacled bear
- Capybara
- Bush dog
- Greater rhea
- South American coati
- South American tapir
- Vicuña
- Margay

=== Discovery Zone ===
The park has a small exhibition area called the Discovery Zone, home to a variety of smaller species, including meerkats, pygmy marmosets, Madagascar hissing cockroaches, plumed basilisks, false water cobras, Australian green tree frogs, green tree pythons and several species of tortoise and tarantula.

=== Other animals ===
- Eurasian brown bear
- European bison
- Northern lynx
- Red-necked wallaby

== On television ==
The BBC children's television series Roar was filmed at both Port Lympne and Howletts Wild Animal Park, and was broadcast on BBC Two and the CBBC channel. The programmes went behind the scenes at the two parks, following the keepers as they tended to the animals.
