= Wynn Al Marjan Island =

Resort in the United Arab Emirates

Coordinates: 25°41′15″N 55°45′18″E

- منتجع وين جزيرة المرجان (Arabic)

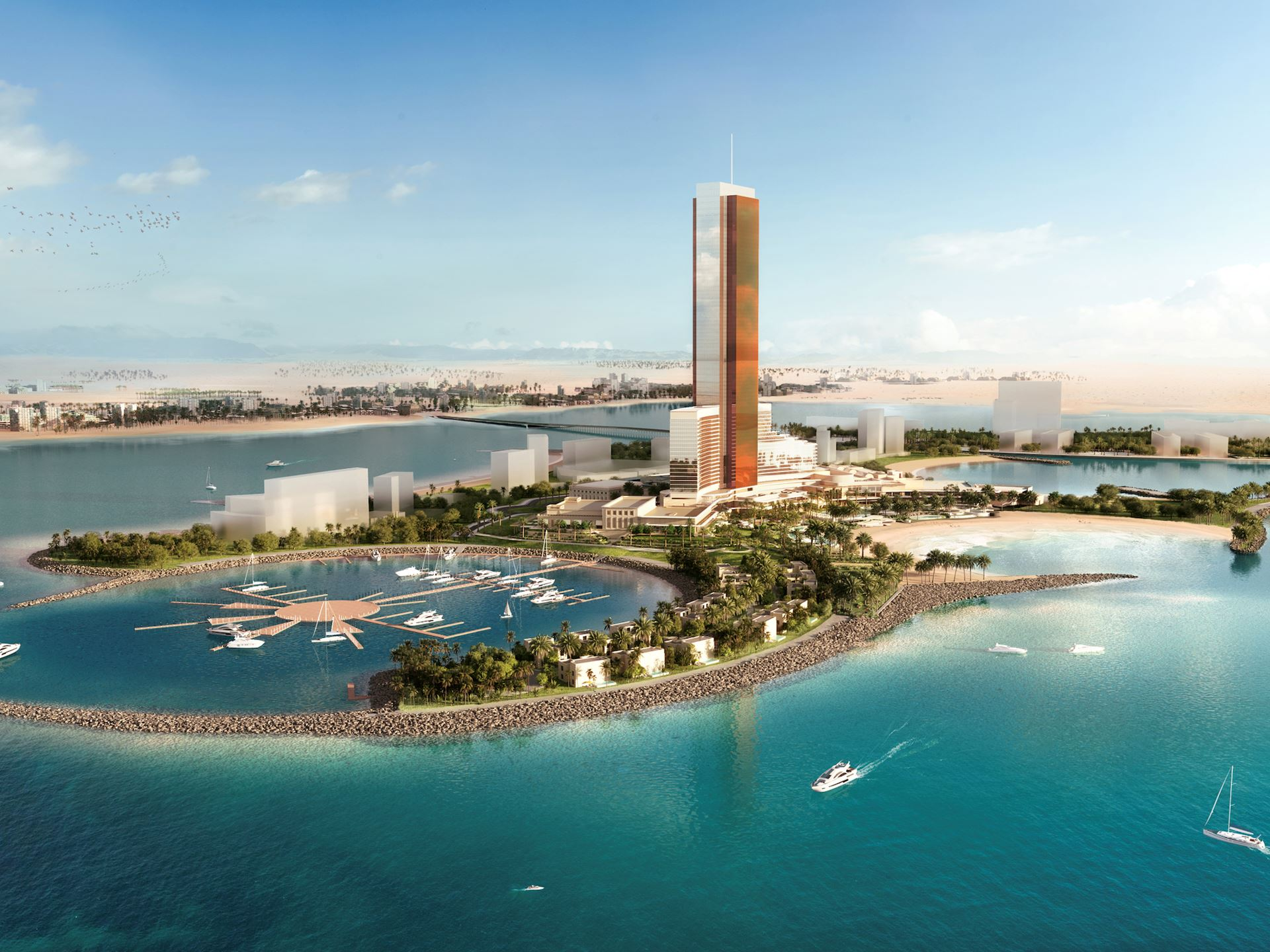
- Interactive map of Wynn Al Marjan Island
- Location: Al Marjan Island, Ras Al Khaimah, United Arab Emirates
- Opened: 2027
- No. of rooms: 1,530
- Gaming space: 225,000 sq ft (20,900 m^{2})
- Casino type: Land-based
- Owner: Wynn Resorts
- Architect: HKS Architects
- Website: www.wynnalmarjanisland.com

Wynn Al Marjan Island (Arabic: منتجع وين جزيرة المرجان) is an under-construction integrated casino and resort hotel developed by Wynn Resorts in Ras Al Khaimah, United Arab Emirates.

== Location and features ==
Wynn Al Marjan Island is being built on Al Marjan Island, a new development in Ras Al Khaimah.

The resort will feature 1,530 accommodations, comprising 1,217 hotel rooms, 297 suites, 2 Royal Apartments, 4 Townhomes, and 10 Marina estates across 70 floors. It also features a 20,900 square metre main casino; 22 restaurants; lounges and bars; 12,000 square meters of retail space; and 7,708 square meters of indoor convention space including a 2,633-square-meter, column-free Grand Ballroom. In April of 2025, Wynn Resorts revealed renderings of what the hotel rooms will look like.

The resort will feature an additional casino on the 22nd floor, which has been described as a "sky gaming casino."

=== Accommodations ===
Included in the hotel will be 297 exclusive suites called Enclave, described as an "ultra-luxury destination within a destination." These suites will be located towards the top of the resort tower and will feature a separate and private entrance from the rest of the resort. Enclave will also feature a private pool and a private beach.

In 2026, Wynn announced the Townhomes within Enclave, a unique private accommodation category with options ranging from 630 to 1,100 square metres. The architecture drew inspiration from Paris mansions, offering a private courtyard and plunge pools. Each Townhome includes a hammam and tepidarium, a screening room, a billiards lounge, a library, a kitchen, and a bar. Access is through a chauffeured vehicle from the royal foyer, eliminating any public check-in. Private chefs and 24-hour butler services are available.

Two marquee apartments—the Mayfair Apartment and Paris Apartment—sit on the highest floors of the 70-story Enclave tower. Wynn describes them as "palaces in the sky" that are unique in the world. Each apartment spans approximately 1,460 square metres across two floors and offers seven bedrooms, private bars, and spaces for gathering, dining and spa treatments. The Paris Apartment was designed by Paris-based Pinto, together with Todd-Avery Lenahan of Wynn Design & Development. It is centered around "the idea of a collector and frequent traveller’s home, combining bespoke furniture, artworks, auction finds and objects sourced from different markets." The Mayfair Apartment, created by Anouska Hempel Design and Todd-Avery Lenahan of Wynn Design & Development, is inspired by "private residences in London, with classical planning, detailed craftsmanship and extensive use of green across its interiors." The accommodations have views of the Arabian Gulf, the Hajar mountains and mainland.

=== Marina ===
Wynn Marina, designed around a distinctive circular harbor, is intended as a "direct extension" of the resort. Connected to the resort by a 197m pontoon bridge, it provides 98 berths accommodating superyachts and megayachts measuring as long as 85 metres. The marina was designed by Marina Solutions International and will be overseen by the operational expertise of IGY Marinas. Wynn Marina is the largest resort-attached marina in the UAE and the first private marina in the UAE able to directly serve superyachts of that size. The marina's centerpiece is the Capitainerie, a swooping building designed by Dewan Architects + Engineers, which provides marina operations, concierge services, and private check-in services. The facility is adjacent to nearby accommodations and restaurants, both serving as a unique backdrop to resort operations and offering proximity to the resort’s facilities. The resort has also announced plans to harbor its own superyacht fleet at Wynn Marina.

=== Restaurants ===
Restaurants planned for opening include Delilah, an upscale American supper club, and Ducasse, a French-American steakhouse by chef Alain Ducasse.

=== Entertainment ===
In 2026, Wynn announced a partnership with British theatre company Punchdrunk to bring an inaugural show to Wynn Al Marjan Island. The production will be unique to Wynn and allow guests to select between a seated experience or a "roaming immersive journey" in which spectators are able to walk below and to the backstage of the show. The wandering show concept is similar to other Punchdrunk productions such as Sleep No More, which ran for 14 years in New York with more than 5,000 performances. It will be Punchdrunk's first MENA production. The show was designed in collaboration with Craig S. Billings, CEO of Wynn Resorts. The New York Times Style Magazine describes the theater itself as "a modern interpretation of a classic theatre, with Art Deco references, rich fabrics, sculpted drapery and grand interior spaces."

=== Other amenities ===
The resort’s water features include a 550-metre white sand beachfront and lagoon. Wynn installed a 319 meter-long network of engineered reef units near the shoreline to support the growth of natural corals and other marine life along the stretch of coast. Osprey have been observed nesting near the newly formed habitats. The beach is divided into a zone for general recreation among hotel guests, an adults-only area, and a private section for Enclave guests only. Cabanas and lounge chairs are available. Among the 21 nearby offshore dive sites are natural reefs and shipwrecks, showing the history of the Emirate.

In 2026, the resort's art collection was revealed to include Jeff Koons' "Tulips", a triceratops skull, and works by both Marc Quinn and Jaume Plensa.

Up to 80% of the resort's planned 9,000+ employees will be accommodated at Wynn Oasis, a 15-building colleague-living residential village, including facilities for visitors and fitness. The facility is said to meet guest hospitality standards.

== History ==
Wynn Resorts secured the first gaming license awarded in the United Arab Emirates in 2024 while Wynn Al Marjan Island was under construction. This will make Wynn Al Marjan Island the first casino resort in the UAE. Wynn Resorts stands to have a monopoly on gaming in the UAE for the first several years before other potential casinos may open. Authorities in the UAE have indicated that they have no plans to award additional casino licenses in the immediate future and it is unknown when that might happen.

By the end of 2024, construction on the property was progressing quickly. 55% of structural concrete was in place and complete up to the 26th floor. 73% of the guest rooms were also in place. Wynn has also acquired an additional 155 acres of land on Al Marjan Island for further development of Wynn Al Marjan Island. Wynn confirmed this acquisition in September of 2025. The additional property has been described as being a “second integrated resort”. The existing plot of land will be expanded through land reclamation. The addition of an adjoining resort also includes an agreement for issuing an IPO.

In early 2025, Wynn Resorts acquired the Crown London Aspinalls casino in London from Crown Resorts. It was rebranded as Wynn Mayfair in June 2025. The purpose of this acquisition is to bring British gamblers to Wynn Al Marjan Island.

By February 2025, Wynn Resorts had completed financing for Wynn Al Marjan Island. It has also been reported that there has been high demand for retail space at the new resort. Rolex has been mentioned as a retailer likely to have a store at the resort.

Wynn Resorts commenced the process of hiring staff for the resort in May of 2025. Multiple job openings were listed less than two years prior to the resort’s planned opening. As June 2025 approached, the resort was reaching 60% completion. The building topped out in December 2025 with 100% of the tower's structural concrete competed and all guest accommodation structure completed. The resort is scheduled to open in 2027.

In 2026, the 548-metre bridge connecting the island to the mainland was named Wynn Bridge, with completion estimated in late 2026.

== See also ==
- List of tallest hotels
- List of tallest buildings in the United Arab Emirates
- List of integrated resorts
