= Louis (gorilla) =

Male gorilla (born 1999)

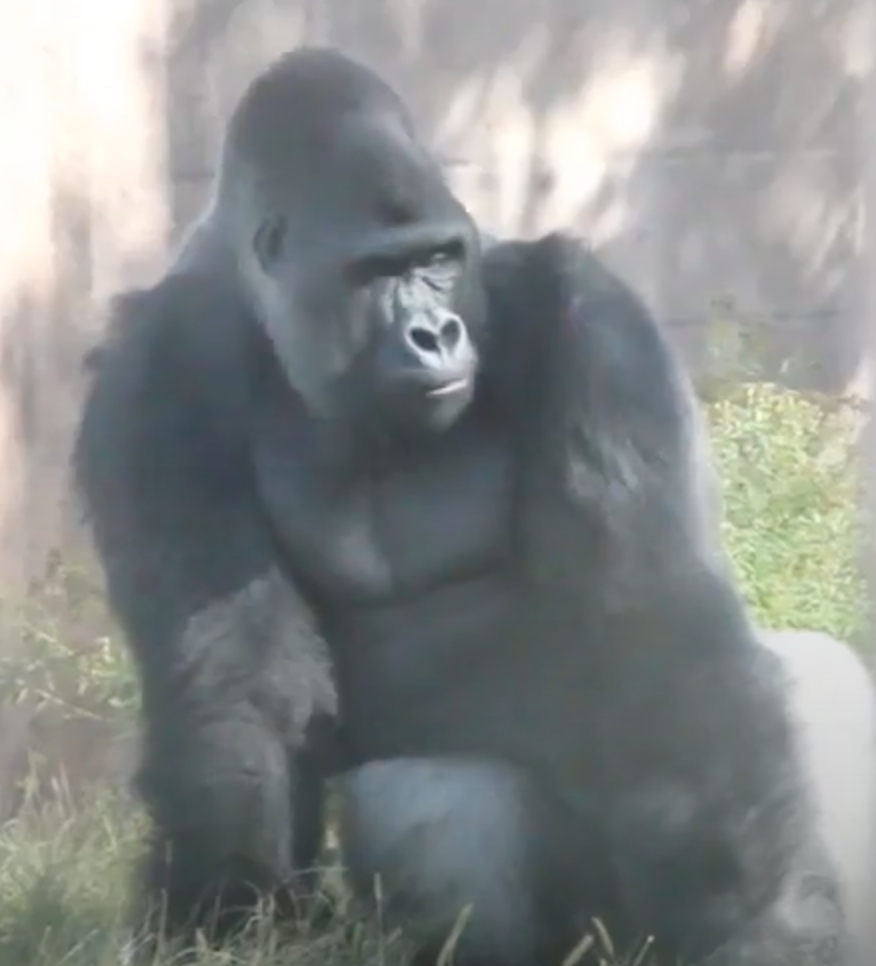
- Louis in 2015
- Species: Western lowland gorilla
- Sex: Male
- Born: May 12, 1999 (age 27); St. Louis Zoo, US
- Known for: Upright walking
- Parents: Jabari (father); Nne (mother)
- Weight: 450 lb (200 kg)
- Height: 6 ft (1.8 m)

Louis the Gorilla (born May 12, 1999) is a western lowland gorilla who is known for walking upright in order to avoid muddying his hands. A clip of Louis that was posted to the Philadelphia Zoo's Facebook page became popular and he gained international fame.

== Life ==
Louis was born at the St. Louis Zoo on May 12, 1999, to his mother, Nne and father, Jabari. Louis arrived at the Philadelphia Zoo on July 13, 2004, along with his mother and father. In 2014, Louis moved into a bachelor troop with another gorilla, Kuchimba.

At the Philadelphia Zoo, Louis is known for his large size as he stands at 6 feet (1.8 m) tall and weighs 450 pounds (200 kg). While Louis is very large, he is probably the shyest of all gorillas at the zoo according to his curator. However, he will charge at the glass on occasion.

Louis and another male, Kuchimba were transferred to the Zoo de Granby from the Philadelphia Zoo in February, 2020.

== Upright walking ==
In March 2018, a video of Louis walking throughout his enclosure on two legs gained nearly 500,000 views in under a month on Facebook.

== See also ==
- Ambam (gorilla)
- List of individual apes
