= John Aspinall (zoo owner) =

English zoo owner & casino owner

- John Aspinall, in 1993
- Born: John Victor Aspinall; 11 June 1926; Delhi, British India
- Died: 29 June 2000 (aged 74); Westminster, London, England
- Other name: Aspers
- Education: Rugby School; Jesus College, Oxford
- Occupations: Bookmaker; Gambler; Zoo keeper
- Years active: 1950–2000
- Known for: Gambling; Aspinalls; Howletts Zoo; Port Lympne Zoo; John Aspinall Foundation association with Lord Lucan
- Political party: Referendum Party
- Spouses: Jane Gordon Hastings (m. 1956; div. 1966) Belinda Mary Musker (m. 1966; div. 1972) Lady Sally Curzon (m. 1972)
- Children: 3, including Damian
- Relatives: Sir George Francis Osborne, 16th Baronet (stepfather); Sir Peter Osborne, 17th Baronet (half-brother); George Osborne (half-nephew); Francis Curzon, 5th Earl Howe (father-in-law)
- Website: http://www.aspinallfoundation.org/

John Victor Aspinall (11 June 1926 – 29 June 2000) was an English zoo and casino owner. From upper class beginnings he used gambling to move to the centre of British high society in the 1960s. He was born in Delhi during the British Raj, and was a citizen of the United Kingdom.

== Early life ==
John Victor Aspinall, known to all his friends as "Aspers", was born in Delhi, British India on 11 June 1926, to Robert Stivala Aspinall (1895–1954), a British Army surgeon of British parentage and Maltese origin; he had added Aspinall to his original surname Stivala after joining the Indian Medical Service, being known for some time as Robert Aspinall-Stivala.

His mother was Mary Grace Horn (died 1987), the daughter of engineer Clement Samuel Horn, of Goring-by-Sea, Sussex.

Years later, when he pressed his father for money to cover his gambling debts, he discovered that his biological father was George Bruce, a soldier of Nordic descent.

Aspinall attended Felsted School in 1939 but after his parents divorced, his stepfather Sir George Osborne sent him to Rugby School, from which he was expelled for inattention. Aspinall later went to Jesus College, Oxford, but on the day of his final exams he feigned illness and went to the Gold Cup at Ascot racecourse instead. As a consequence, he never earned a degree.

== Gambling impresario ==
Aspinall became a bookmaker; at that time the only gambling permitted by UK law was with cash and credit on the premises of racecourses and dog tracks, with credit by an account with a bookmaker, and on football pools. Casino gambling was not permitted at the time. However, between races Aspinall returned to London and hosted private gaming parties. He believed that games of Chemin de Fer, known as Chemie (Chemmy), were within the law in certain circumstances, and on average the owner of the house was able to make a 5% profit on the turnover of games.

Aspinall targeted his events at the rich, sending out embossed invitations. Gambling houses were defined then in British law as places where gambling had taken place more than three times. With his Irish-born accountant John Burke, Aspinall rented upper class flats and houses, never used them more than three times, and had his mother pay off local Metropolitan Police officers.

Among the gamblers were the Queen's racehorse trainer Bernard van Cutsem, who brought with him friends including the Earl of Derby and the Duke of Devonshire. The standard bet was £1,000, which would be £25,000 accounting for inflation in 2007 figures. Chemie games were quick and played every 30 seconds, with £50,000 changing hands per game. On his first such event Aspinall made a profit of £10,000, a sum roughly equivalent to £300,000 in 2017 money.

In 1958, Aspinall was living at Howletts Zoo, in Kent; at one point his mother Mary (Lady Osborne) had forgotten to pay off corrupt police officers, so the police raided his game that night.

Aspinall, John Burke and Lady Osborne were all charged with gaming offences but won the subsequent court case, the outcome of which is known as Aspinall's Law. The win created a vast increase in Chemie games, during which:

- The landowner, Edward Stanley, 18th Earl of Derby, lost over £20,000; and then returned on another night and lost £300,000.
- William Stirling, older brother of the founder of the Special Air Service, Colonel Sir David Stirling, lost £173,500 on Aspinall's tables, writing out an IOU at the end of the night.

In response to Aspinall's win in court, the British Government brought forward the Betting and Gaming Act 1960, which when enacted allowed commercial bingo halls to be set up, provided they were established as members-only clubs and made their profit from membership fees and charges, and not from a percentage of the money staked. Casinos were required to operate under the same rules, with a licence from the Gaming Board of Great Britain (now the Gambling Commission), and to be members-only. The passing of these laws brought Aspinall's Chemie-based 5% business model to a close, and he had to find a new business.

=== Casinos ===
In 1962, Aspinall founded the Clermont Club in London's Mayfair. The club was named after Lord Clermont, a gambler who had previously owned the building in Berkeley Square. The club's original members included five dukes, five marquesses, twenty earls and two cabinet ministers. Overheads were higher, and under the new laws, Aspinall was required to pay tax, only making a table charge which produced much smaller revenue for the house.

In Douglas Thompson's book The Hustlers, and the later documentary on Channel 4, The Real Casino Royale, the club's former financial director John Burke and gangster Billy Hill's associate John McKew, claimed that Aspinall worked with Hill to employ criminals to cheat the players. Some of the wealthiest people in Britain were swindled out of millions of pounds, thanks to a gambling con known as "the Big Edge".

John Burke quit in late 1965, a year into the scam. After two years operation the Big Edge was closed. Hill respected Aspinall's decision and the two parted. The passing of the 1968 Gaming Act boosted profits, and he sold The Clermont in 1972.

The need for revenue to support his zoos prompted Aspinall to return to running gambling clubs in London, and he set up two new successful ones in Knightsbridge (in 1978) and Mayfair. In 1983, he made $30 million from their sale, but a decade later he was in financial difficulties once more, and in 1992 he set up yet another gambling spot, Aspinalls, which is now known as Wynn Mayfair.

== Animal parks ==
In his years at Oxford, Aspinall had loved the book Nada the Lily by H. Rider Haggard, about an illegitimate Zulu prince who lived outside his tribe among wild animals. In 1956, Aspinall moved into an Eaton Place apartment with his first wife. In the back garden, Aspinall built a garden shed housing a capuchin monkey, a 9-week-old tiger, and two Himalayan brown bears.

Later that year, with proceeds from his gambling, Aspinall purchased Howletts country house and estate near Canterbury, Kent. He lived in the house and set up a private zoo, Howletts Zoo, in the grounds. In 1973, because of need for further space for his collection of animals, Aspinall bought Port Lympne near Hythe, Kent. He opened Howletts to the public in 1975, and Port Lympne Zoo in 1976. He embarked on a 10-year programme to restore Port Lympne Mansion previously owned by Sir Philip Sassoon. Both Howletts and Port Lympne have been run by The Aspinall Foundation since 1984.

The zoos are known for the encouragement of close personal relationships between staff and animals, for their breeding of rare and endangered species and for the deaths of keepers who have been killed by the animals in their care.

== Politics ==
Aspinall ran unsuccessfully for Parliament at the 1997 general election as the candidate of Sir James Goldsmith's single-issue (against Britain's involvement in the European Union) Referendum Party in the Folkestone and Hythe constituency, where he was defeated by senior Conservative Michael Howard. Aspinall received over 4,000 votes and 8% of the vote (thus saving his deposit), which was one of the Referendum Party's best results.

In private, Aspinall would express antisemitic views, including hatred towards Jews, and an admiration for Adolf Hitler. He was known to enjoy being provocative and believed an outrageous remark could provoke full-blooded responses and spirited debate, something he very much enjoyed. In Douglas Thompson's book The Hustlers former Clermont Club financial director John Burke states:

It's amazing how much he owed to Jimmy Goldsmith and people like Sydney Summer. Eddie Gilbert, of course, was a Jew. I don't think John really meant it at all. It was probably more of an act to impress people, to startle people. John was a superb actor.

== Lucan connection ==
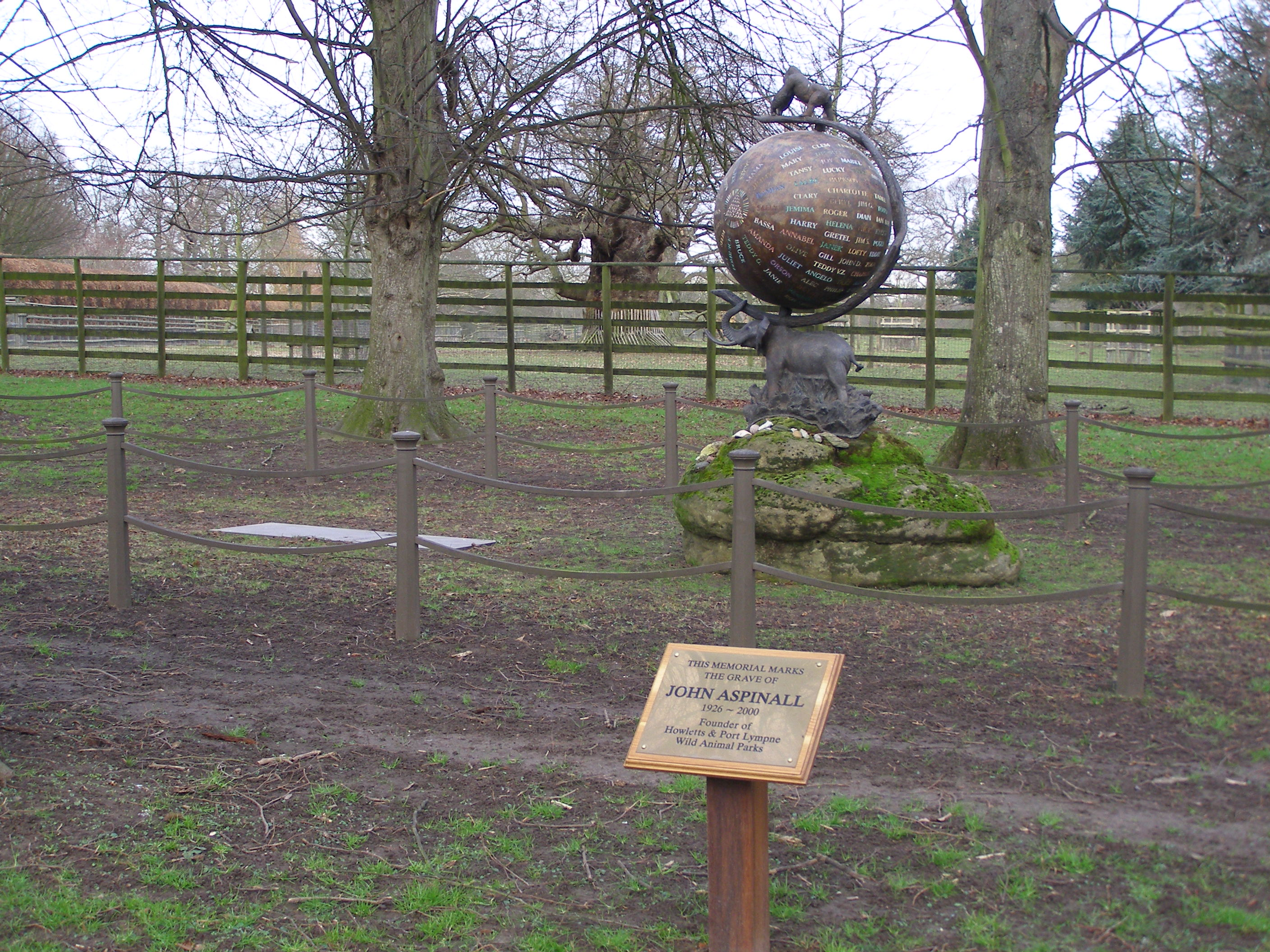
John Aspinall's grave and memorial

Aspinall claimed that Lord Lucan, whose 1974 disappearance remains unresolved, had committed suicide by scuttling his motorboat and jumping into the English Channel with a stone tied around his body. According to the journalist Lynn Barber, in an interview in 1990, Aspinall made a slip of the tongue indicating Lucan had remained Aspinall's friend beyond the date of the alleged suicide.

On 18 February 2012, Glenn Campbell of BBC News reported that John Aspinall's ex-secretary (using the pseudonym of Jill Findlay) had disclosed that she was invited into meetings where Aspinall and Goldsmith discussed Lucan. She further said, that on two occasions, between 1979 and 1981, Aspinall instructed her to book trips to Kenya and Gabon for Lucan's children. The arrangement was so Lucan could see his children from a distance, but he was not to meet them or speak to them.

== Marriages and family ==
In 1956, he married Jane Gordon Hastings, a Scottish model (sister of Pye Hastings and Jimmy Hastings); the couple had one son, Damian Aspinall. Aspinall divorced her in 1966. In the same year, on 13 December, he married his second wife Belinda Mary Musker (b. 27 November 1942), daughter of Major Anthony Dermot Melloney Musker (killed in a motor racing accident on 8 August 1959) and wife (b. 2 November 1940) The Hon. Mary Angela FitzRoy, without issue.

In 1972, he divorced his second wife and married Lady Sarah-Marguerite "Sally" Curzon (25 January 1945 - 17 June 2025), daughter of Francis Curzon, 5th Earl Howe, and Sybil Boyter Johnson. She was a widow who was previously married to the racing driver Piers Courage. John and Sally had a son Bassa Wulfhere Aspinall (b 1972). He also had a daughter, Amanda, and two stepsons, Jason and Amos Courage. Amanda was married to musician Daryl Hall (of the musical duo Hall & Oates); she died in 2019 from alcohol intoxication.

Through his stepfather Sir George Francis Osborne, 16th Baronet, he is step-uncle to George Osborne, former Chancellor of the Exchequer of the UK, who is in line to inherit the title of the Osborne baronets of Ballintaylor and Ballylemon from his father, Sir George's son, Sir Peter Osborne, 17th Baronet.

Aspinall died of cancer, in Westminster, London, on 29 June 2000, aged 74.

== Media ==
A 1977 documentary, Echo of the Wild, by Roy Deverell told the story of the Aspinall Foundation and featured Damian and John Aspinall. Another Deverell documentary, 1983's A Passion to Protect chronicled Aspinall's life up to that point. A book published in 1988, The Passion of John Aspinall, was written by Brian Masters.

Aspinall was portrayed by Christopher Eccleston in the 2013 TV series Lucan.
