= Howletts Wild Animal Park =

Coordinates: 51°16′N 1°9′E

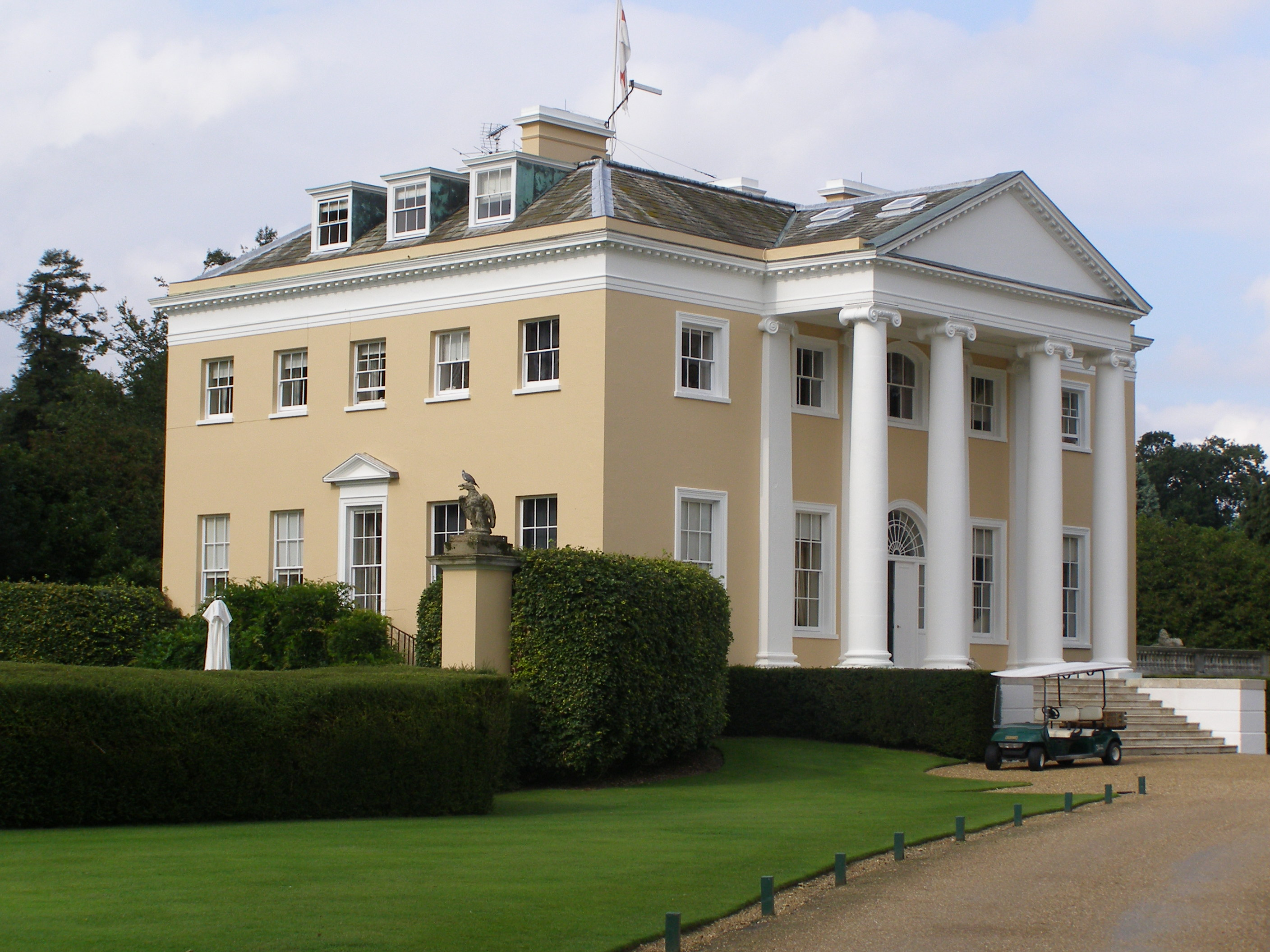
- Howletts House
- Interactive map of Howletts Wild Animal Park
- Date opened: 1975
- Location: Bekesbourne near Canterbury, Kent, England
- Land area: 90 acres (36 ha)
- No. of animals: 450+
- No. of species: 44

Howletts Wild Animal Park (formerly known as Howletts Zoo) in the parish of Bekesbourne, near Canterbury in Kent, was established as a private zoo in 1957 by John Aspinall. In 1962, the House known as Howletts was being restored. A small cottage was inhabited by an employee. The animal collection was opened to the public in 1975. To give more room for the animals another estate at Port Lympne near Hythe in Kent was purchased in 1973, and opened to the public as Port Lympne Zoo in 1976.

The collection is known for being unorthodox, for the encouragement of close personal relationships between staff and animals, and for the breeding of rare and endangered species. Steve Irwin visited the park in 2004 and described the zoo's gorillas as "the finest in the world".

Since 1984, both parks have been owned by the John Aspinall Foundation, a charity. Following his death, John Aspinall was buried in front of the Howletts House and a memorial was built next to the grave near the bison. A later extension to Howletts was an open-topped enclosure for black and white colobus, just behind the entrance.

== Animal collection ==
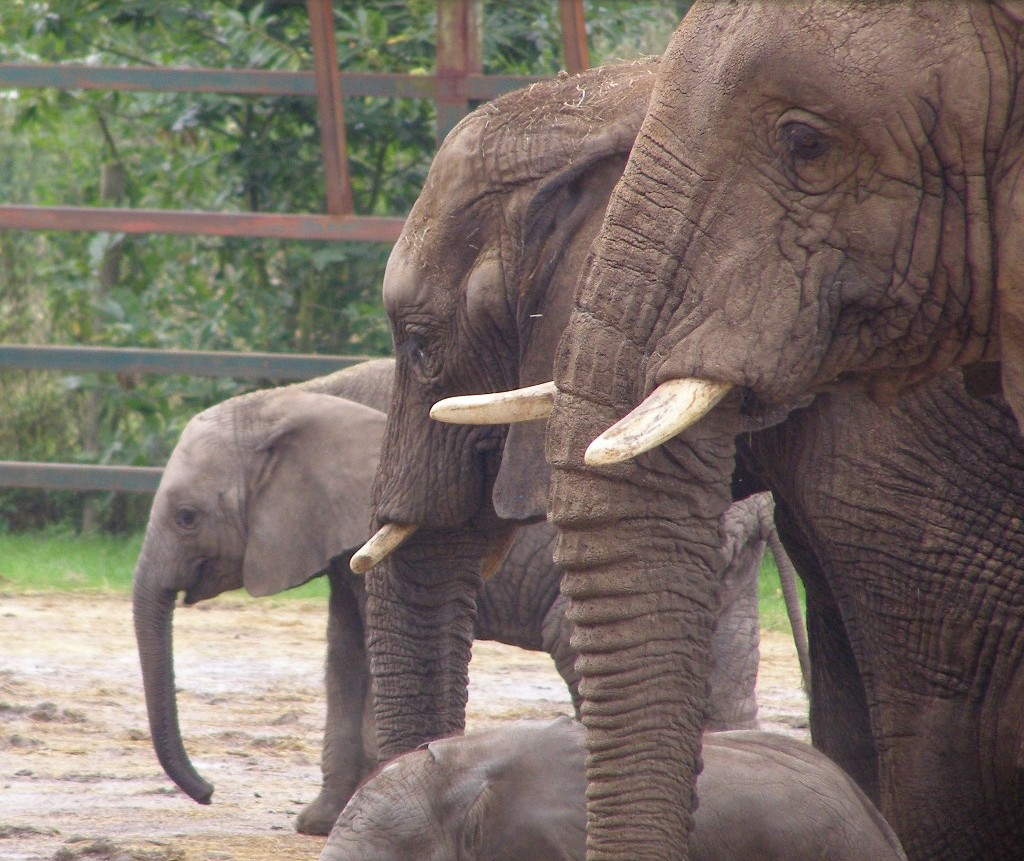
African elephants at Howletts, the largest breeding herd in the United Kingdom

The park has some of the largest family groups of western lowland gorillas in the world. It is also home to the largest breeding herd of African elephants in the United Kingdom and has one of the largest breeding groups of lion-tailed macaques in the world.

== Charity events ==
The charity that runs Howletts and Port Lympne Wild Animal Park, the John Aspinall Foundation, also runs animal conservation programmes. It has had recent success in releasing a black rhino into the wild and has previously released other black rhinos and gorillas.

== Television ==
Howletts and Port Lympne have featured on the CBBC television programme Roar. This shows the two parks, the life of the animals and how the keepers look after them. The first series was filmed in 2006 and, as of March 2009, there have been four series in total.

== Howletts House ==
Originally called Owletts, in the parish of Bekesbourne, the present house containing 30 rooms was built for Isaac Baugh in 1787 and replaced a previous house which had been the seat of the Isaac family until the reign of Queen Elizabeth I, later of the Hales family for several generations. It passed into the ownership of the Gipps family in 1816. It has been a Grade II* listed building and on the National Heritage List for England since January 1967. The house is presently let by the Aspinall Foundation to Damian Aspinall

== See also ==
- Port Lympne Wild Animal Park
