= Wynn Resorts =

American casino company

Wynn Resorts, Limited
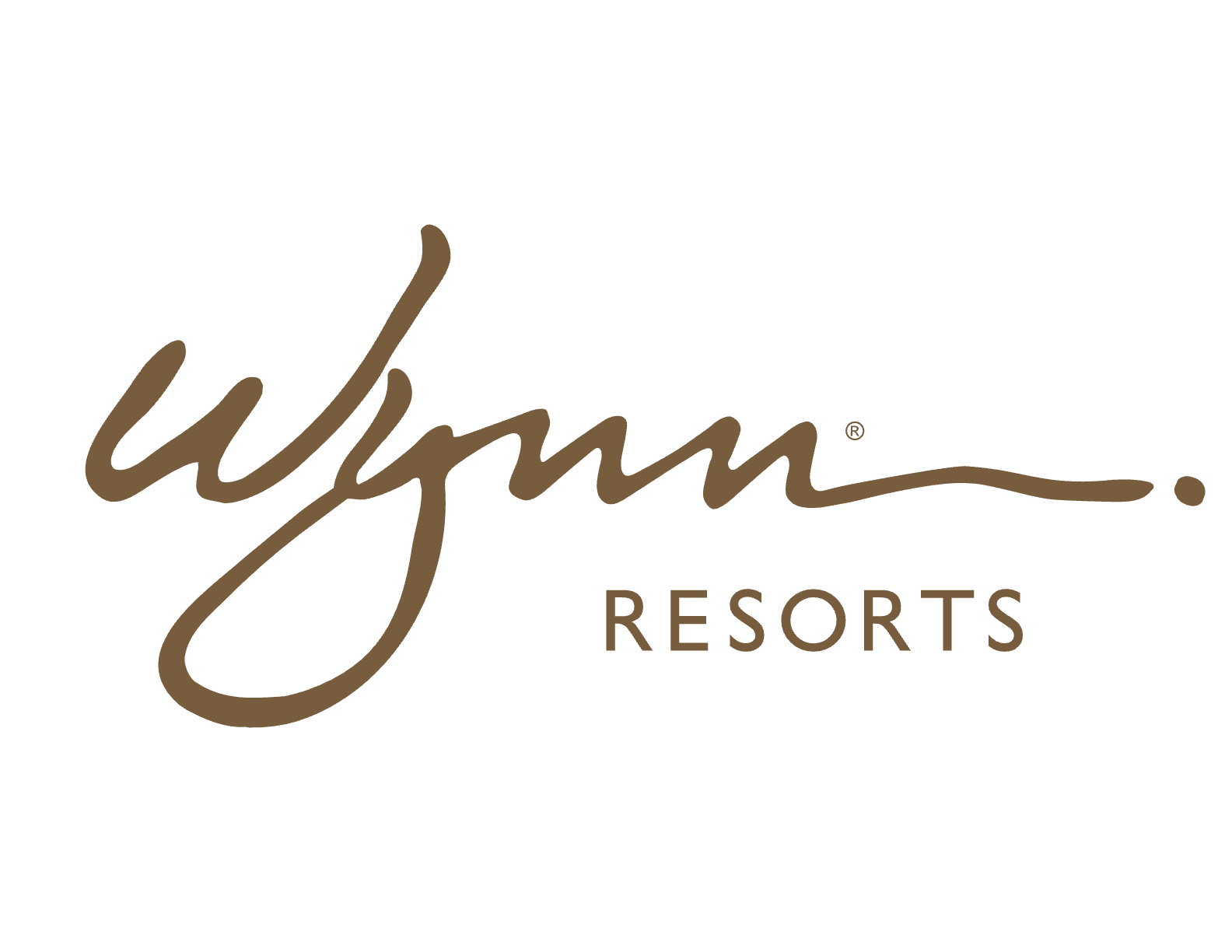
- Type: Public
- Traded as: Nasdaq: WYNN; S&P 500 component
- Industry: Hospitality, Tourism, Gaming
- Founded: 2002; 24 years ago
- Founders: Steve Wynn; Elaine Wynn; Kazuo Okada
- Headquarters: Las Vegas Strip (Paradise), Nevada, U.S.
- Area served: Everett, Massachusetts (U.S.); Las Vegas, Nevada (U.S.); Macau (China)
- Key people: Craig Billings (CEO)
- Products: Casinos, Entertainment, Gaming and Integrated Resorts
- Revenue: ▲US$7.128 billion (2024)
- Operating income: ▲US$1.133 billion (2024)
- Net income: ▼US$501 million (2024)
- Total assets: ▼US$12.98 billion (2024)
- Total equity: ▲US$−224 million (2024)
- Owner: Tilman Fertitta (12.3%)
- Number of employees: 28,000 (2024)
- Website: wynnresorts.com

Previous Wynn Resorts logo

Wynn Resorts, Limited is an American publicly traded corporation based in Paradise, Nevada, that is a developer and operator of high-end hotels and casinos. It was founded in 2002 by former Mirage Resorts Chairman and CEO Steve Wynn and is now run by CEO Craig Billings. As of 2020, the company has developed six properties.

== History ==
In 2000, Steve Wynn agreed to sell Mirage Resorts to MGM Grand, after having led Mirage and its predecessors since 1973. Wynn laid the foundation for his next venture that same year, buying the Desert Inn for $270 million. Wynn found an early partner in Japanese billionaire Kazuo Okada of Universal Entertainment Corporation. Wynn, together with Universal subsidiary Aruze USA, controlled almost half the stock, making it harder for outside investors to exert control, as they had done at Mirage in response to Wynn's prolific spending.

Wynn hired investment banker Ronald Kramer as president and director in 2002 in order to help take the company public and oversee its expansion. Steve Wynn's wife, and later ex-wife, Elaine was acknowledged to have been the company's largest shareholder. Wynn Resorts made its initial public offering on NASDAQ on October 25, 2002. The company's first project, Wynn Las Vegas, opened on April 28, 2005. Wynn Macau, the company's second project started construction on June 28, 2004. It opened September 6, 2006 and is now the largest-grossing casino in the region.

Encore, an extension to Wynn Las Vegas, broke ground on April 28, 2006, the first anniversary of the opening of Wynn Las Vegas. Encore at Wynn Macau, the company's second project on the Macau Peninsula, Macau, People's Republic of China, opened on April 21, 2010. A second resort in Macau, Wynn Palace in Cotai, opened August 22, 2016, on 52 acres (21 ha).

The Encore in Las Vegas opened shortly after the beginning of the Great Recession. Despite the additional casino at the Encore (which added 97 tables and 857 slot machines to the original 190 tables and 2000 slots), net casino revenues for the combined resort were initially lower.

Similarly, in the first quarter of 2009, net revenues of the Macau operations declined. Following the global economic recovery, performance of the Wynn properties also recovered. Wynn remained the only gaming operator to not perform mass layoffs during the recession.

The company considered opening a casino as part of the Entertainment City development in the Philippines, but decided against it because of corruption in the country's gaming industry. Okada decided to proceed with the project alone, leading to the rupture of his partnership with Wynn. The dispute went public with reciprocal accusations of corrupt practices.

Wynn and his allies accused Okada of bribing Philippines gaming regulators with over $110,000 in benefits, including free nights in a luxury suite at Wynn Las Vegas, while Okada claimed that Wynn Resorts' record $135 million donation to the University of Macau constituted a bribe. Okada resigned as vice chairman in October 2011, and the following February, after a company investigation by the Freeh Group confirmed the charges against him, the board of directors forced Aruze USA to sell back its shares at a nearly 30% discount. Aruze had been the company's largest shareholder, with a 19.7% stake.

On September 17, 2014, the Massachusetts Gaming Commission voted to approve Wynn Resorts' proposed $1.6 billion casino to be located in Everett, Massachusetts, on the Mystic River, just north of Boston. Encore Boston Harbor opened on June 23, 2019 at a cost of $1.4 billion.” On February 6, 2018, Steve Wynn resigned as CEO of the company amidst sexual allegations and was replaced by Matthew Maddox. Amid sexual harassment lawsuits involving directors, Maddox announced the planned departure of two board members, Ray Irani and Alvin Shoemaker, on March 7, 2018. The departure of Irani and Shoemaker was to reassure investors that the corporate culture was changing.

In April 2018, the company nominated three women to the board of directors: Dee Dee Myers, Betsy Atkins, and Wendy Webb. Elaine Wynn, who still served on the company's board of directors, would acquire her ex-husband's stock and have her voting rights, which she had previously lost in her 2010 divorce from Steve, restored. Elaine Wynn would also become owner of Wynn Resorts, maintaining 8.25 % of the company's stock by December 2021.

Talks between Wynn and Crown Resorts of Australia for a $7.1 billion offer collapsed in April 2019; analysts saw the bid as an attempt to diversify away from Macau, where its license was set to expire in 2022. Wynn reached an agreement with the government of Macau for an extension of its concession on December 16, 2022. On May 28, 2019, Wynn paid a $35 million fine to the Massachusetts Gaming Commission and the $500,000 fine placed on Matthew Maddox.

On November 9, 2021, Wynn announced that Matthew Maddox would be stepping down as CEO on January 31, 2022. Craig Billings was named as successor to Maddox. Previously, Craig Billings was the CEO of Wynn Interactive and former CFO of Wynn Resorts. Billings assumed the role of CEO effective February 1, 2022.

As of 2024, Wynn Resorts was bidding for a casino license to build an integrated resort at the Hudson Yards in New York City. Wynn entered into a partnership with Related Companies to develop an integrated resort with a casino on the western yard; it was announced that the plan would include a "resort tower" featuring a casino and hotel. The plan included a 2-million-square-foot office tower, as well as 5.5 acres of public parkland, a public school, and a 1 million-square-foot apartment building with 329 affordable housing units. However, supporters of the High Line later prompted Wynn to make "substantive changes to plans in response to [supporters'] concerns"; the revised plan now includes 5.6 acres of public green space in order to generate thousands of union jobs.

In March 2024, Wynn Resorts released renderings of the proposed resort and other components of the western portion of the project. Wynn’s proposal for the site was to build a 1,189 foot tall 80 story hotel and casino above the western portion of the West Side Yards. Wynn New York City would have had 1,750 rooms, making it one of the largest hotels in New York City. Wynn Resorts withdrew their New York City casino bid in May 2025.

Wynn Al Marjan Island began construction in 2024, and is slated to become the first legal casino in the United Arab Emirates. They are also looking to expand their new property in the UAE in the years following its opening. Wynn Resorts was also exploring the possibility of developing a property in Thailand, if gambling were to be legalized there, however efforts to legalize casinos in Thailand have stalled.

In November 2024, prominent Houston-based billionaire Tilman Fertitta, who also owned the rival Golden Nugget brand of casinos, became the largest stockholder at Wynn Resorts after acquiring 9.9% of the company. In April 2025, Fertitta managed to increase his stake at Wynn Resorts after acquiring 12.3% of the company. In January 2025, Wynn Resorts completed the acquisition of the Crown London casino, formerly owned by Crown Resorts. It was rebranded as Wynn Mayfair. On April 14, 2025, Elaine Wynn died at 82 years of age.

In February 2026, Wynn Resorts suffered a date breach and extortion by cyberhacking group ShinyHunters, affecting the private data of about 800,000. The hackers demanded about $1.5 million in Bitcoin as ransom. A lawsuit seeking class action status for the breach was filed in U.S. District Court in Las Vegas on February 21, 2026. MGM Resorts and Caesar's Entertainment were both victims of cyberattacks by Scattered Spider in 2023, which forged a cybercrime collective with ShinyHunters as well as Lapsus$ in 2025.

=== Economic performance ===
In 2017 CNBC reported that Wynn's stock was up 44% for the year and that Wynn's Macau operations were the leading US-based resorts there. Wynn resorts continued to operate during the pandemic while requiring employees who chose not to receive a COVID-19 vaccination to submit weekly test results for the virus; employees were paid during this time,with added commensurate compensation for tipped employees. The company temporarily suspended its dividend in response to liquidity issues during the pandemic; the divided was reinstated in May 2023. Following the lifting of pandemic-related restrictions being lifted in the US and in Macau, the company began increasing revenues and profits.

=== Union relations ===
47% of Wynn's American employees are unionized. The largest union of Wynn employees is the Culinary Workers Union which agreed to delay automatic contractual wage increases for its members during the COVID-19 pandemic. In 2023 the union reached a new five-year agreement with Wynn which provided pay raises for the employees and was approved with 99% of the vote.

== Properties ==
=== Properties in the United States ===
==== Las Vegas Strip, Nevada ====
Image	Logo	Property	Date Opened
		Wynn Las Vegas	April 28, 2005; 21 years ago
		Encore Las Vegas	December 22, 2008; 17 years ago

==== Everett, Massachusetts ====
Image	Logo	Property	Date Opened
		Encore Boston Harbor	June 23, 2019; 7 years ago

=== Properties in the United Kingdom ===
==== London, England ====
Image	Logo	Property	Date Opened
		Wynn Mayfair	1960; 66 years ago

=== Properties in China ===
==== Macau ====
Image	Logo	Property	Date Opened
		Wynn Macau	September 6, 2006; 20 years ago
		Encore at Wynn Macau	April 21, 2010; 16 years ago
		Wynn Palace	August 22, 2016; 10 years ago

=== Future properties ===
==== Ras al Khaimah, UAE ====
Image	Logo	Property	Date Opening
		Wynn Al Marjan Island	Q1 2027

=== Proposed properties ===
==== Las Vegas Strip, Nevada ====
Image	Property	Date Opening
	Wynn West	TBD

=== Former properties ===
==== Las Vegas Strip, Nevada ====
Image	Property	Date Opened	Date Closed
	Desert Inn	April 24, 1950; 76 years ago	August 28, 2000; 26 years ago

== See also ==
- List of integrated resorts
- List of casino hotels
