= Wynn Mayfair =

British casino

Coordinates: 51.506364°N 0.149459°W

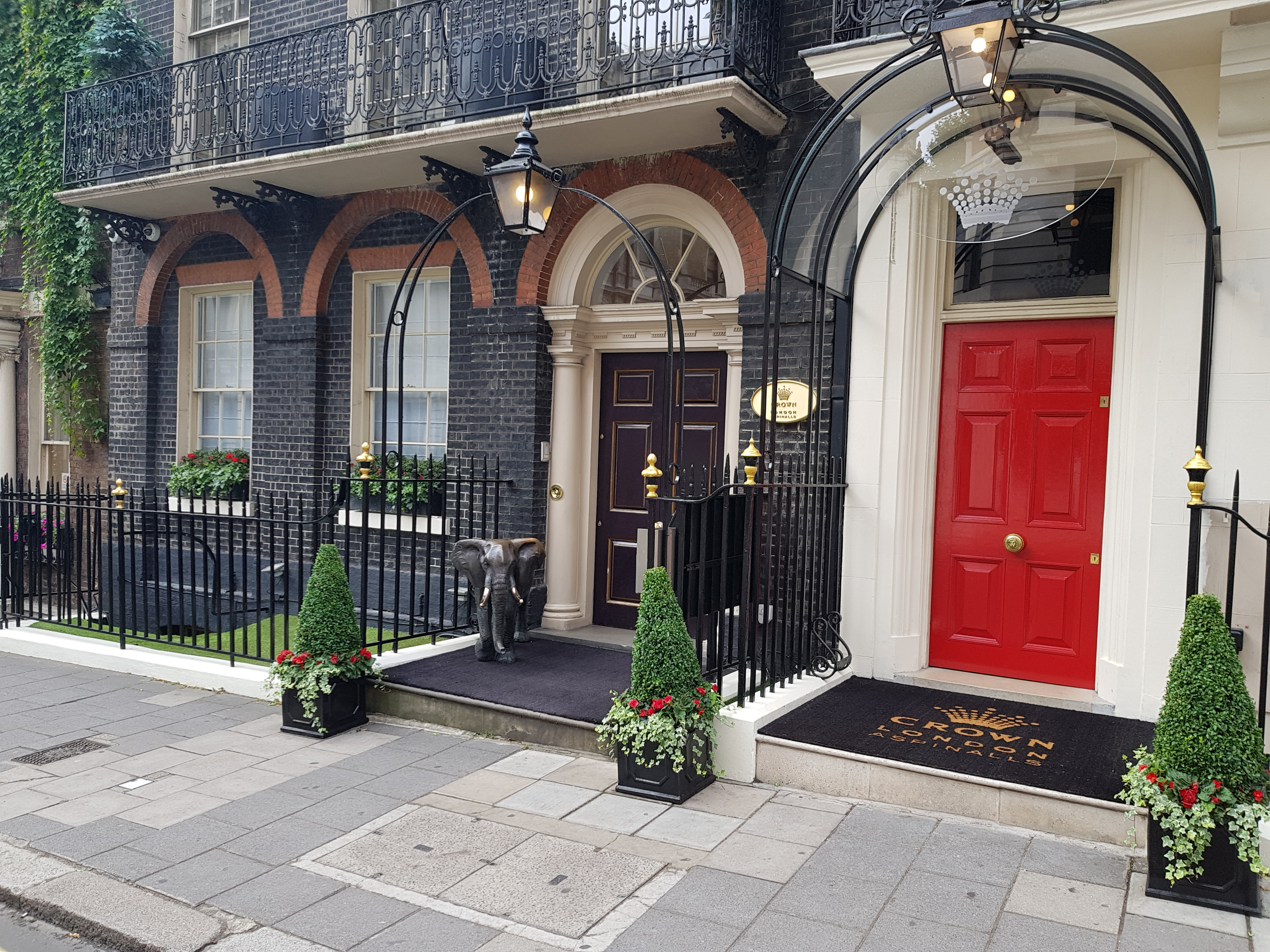
- Front entrance
- Interactive map of Wynn Mayfair
- Location: London, England; 27–28 Curzon Street, Mayfair
- Opened: 1960s
- Gaming space: VIP Rooms for up to 25 people each
- Casino type: Land based
- Operating license holder: Wynn Resorts
- Website: www.wynnmayfair.com

Wynn Mayfair, previously known as the White Elephant Club, Crown London and Aspinall's, is a private members club, established by John Aspinall in London since the 1960s. Wynn Mayfair is located at 27–28 Curzon Street in Mayfair, London. It was renamed on June 5, 2025, following acquisition by Wynn Resorts.

== History ==
Club founder John Aspinall, known as "Aspers" to his friends, was a conservationist and the stepson of Sir George Osborne. He was a breeder of wild animals and funded his zoos, to a large extent, from house winnings.

=== In the 1900s ===
In the 1960s-90s, the building was known as the White Elephant Club, a dining destination frequented by members such as Charlie Chaplin. Later in 1992, Aspinall turned the property in to a casino named Aspinall's. He commissioned a bust of Lord Lucan, a close friend of Aspinall who disappeared in November 1974, after the murder of Sandra Rivett, the nanny of Lucan's children. It remains prominently displayed. The elephant from the White Elephant Club is still at the main entrance of the casino.

=== Operation by Crown Resorts ===
The casino was owned by Crown Resorts, one of Australia's largest entertainment groups until 2025. In July 2020, a black female croupier filed a claim with London Employment tribunal alleging the casino granted a request by a customer to be served only by "female dealers with fair skin" and "western-looking female staff". The casino accordingly refused to approve a shift-swap by the member of staff. In November 2021, the tribunal found in favour of the claimant, that the behaviour of Crown Resorts constituted racial discrimination and that Crown Resorts' training systems were inadequate.

=== Purchase by Wynn Resorts ===
In early 2025, the casino was acquired by Wynn Resorts. The acquisition is part of an effort to bring British gamblers to Wynn’s upcoming Wynn Al Marjan Island integrated resort in Ras Al Khaimah, United Arab Emirates, which will open in 2027. Wynn Mayfair is Wynn’s first property in Europe and their first not to include a hotel.

== Facilities ==
The casino has 20 gaming tables. Games include roulette, blackjack, baccarat, three card poker and poker tournaments. There is additionally a bar, restaurant and terrace. The restaurant is helmed by executive chef Nicola Ducceschi.

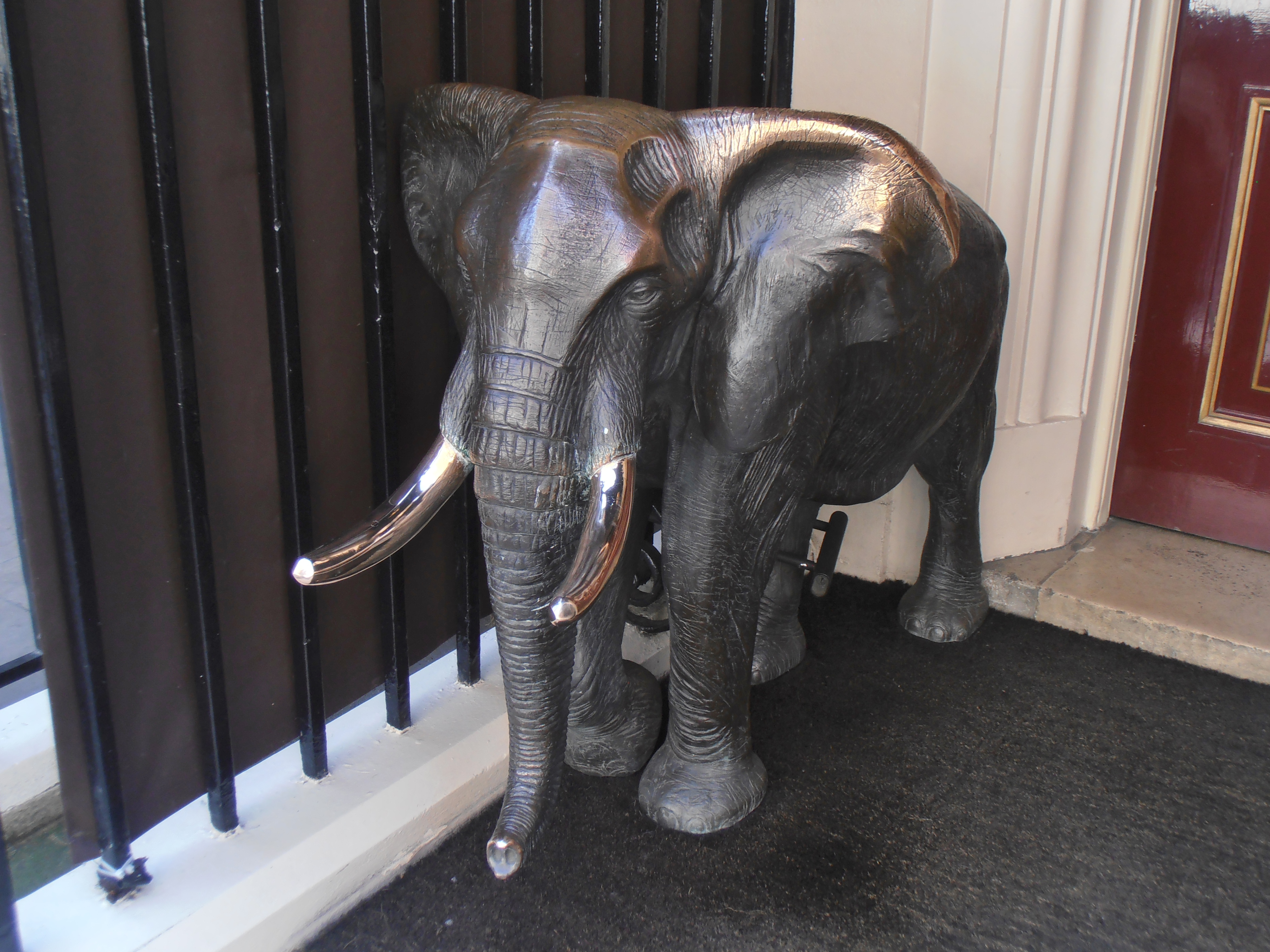
Bronze elephant at entrance

== See also ==
- Clermont Club
