= The Aspinall Foundation =

Wildlife conservation charity

- Formation: 1984; 42 years ago
- Founder: John Aspinall
- Registration no.: 326567
- Legal status: Charitable organization
- Purpose: Wildlife conservation
- Leader: Damian Aspinall
- Website: www.aspinallfoundation.org

The Aspinall Foundation (formerly The John Aspinall Foundation) is a British charity that promotes wildlife conservation. It was set up by casino owner John Aspinall in 1984. It runs conservation projects to protect endangered species and rehome captive animals in the wild. The current chairman is Damian Aspinall, son of the founder, and is likely to be succeeded by his daughter, Freya Aspinall, an Internet celebrity who uses social media to increase exposure for the charity and runs the charity's U.S. based affiliate.

The foundation owns approximately 1 million acres in Gabon, into which it reintroduces gorillas.

In 2020, the foundation received £1,500,000 from corporate and private donors.

== History ==
In 2002, in Gabon, the foundation was the first to reintroduce captivity-born young gorillas into the wild.

In 2006, 5 gorillas that were rehabilitated by the foundation and released into the wild after they were orphaned due to the bushmeat trade and then sold into the illegal pet market were relocated to an island after wandering into nearby villages searching for love.

In 2007, the charity publicly opposed Chinese attempts to relax the rules governing the trade in products made from tigers.

Since 2008, the foundation has spearheaded conservation efforts to save the critically endangered greater bamboo lemur. The estimated population size of the greater bamboo lemur has risen since 2009 from 100 to 1,000 individuals. As a result of the efforts of the foundation, the greater bamboo lemur was removed from the list of 25 most threatened primates in the world.

In 2010, a video of Damian Aspinall tracking Kwibi, a celebrity gorilla released in 2005 at age 5 in Gabon, became widely viewed on YouTube.

The foundation started the Javan Primate Project in 2012 and has since released more than 135 primates including Javan langurs, moloch gibbons and grizzled leaf monkeys into protected sites in Java. The animals include those rescued from the local illegal pet trade and rewilded from Aspinall's two UK wildlife parks.

In 2013, the foundation launched a programme to breed European wildcats, with plans to create a breeding centre on the island of Càrna, off the west coast of Scotland.

By 2014, according to the foundation, it had "successfully reintroduced more than 50 gorillas back into the wild since 1996".

In October 2019, the foundation – alongside an international team of conservationists – rescued 11 elephants, 4 giraffe, 19 African Buffalo and 29 wildebeest from Blaauwbosch, South Africa, after a sustained period of drought and neglect at a mismanaged game reserve.

In February 2020, the foundation became the first to send captive bred cheetahs from the UK for rewilding in South Africa. Damian Aspinall personally released the two male cheetahs, who were born at Port Lympne, into their new home close to Cape Town.

== Controversies ==
=== Payment of £150,158 to wife of chairman, conflicts of interest ===
Between 2019 and 2020, the foundation paid £150,158 to Victoria Aspinall, the wife of chairman Damian Aspinall, as fees for "interior design services". In 2020, the amount paid to Aspinall represented 10% of donations taken that year. The charity also paid £124,231 for accountancy work from a firm of which another trustee was a director. The charity owns a 30-room mansion in Kent; it was rented to chairman Damian Aspinall for £2,500 a month in 2019 and £10,000 per month in 2020.

In March 2021, the Charity Commission for England and Wales opened a statutory inquiry into the foundation over concerns about the charity's governance and financial management after reports of possible conflicts of interest and related-party transactions. In June 2022, as a result of financial irregularities discovered, Damian Aspinall was asked to stand down as chairman and trustee. Robin Birley and Ben Goldsmith resigned as trustees.

=== Hiring of Carrie Johnson, lobbying activities ===
In January 2021, the foundation hired Carrie Johnson, wife of Boris Johnson, as director of communication months after it asked Zac Goldsmith, Minister of State for Climate, Environment and Energy, for government support to buy a wildlife reserve in South Africa.

=== Effectiveness of sending zoo-born animals into the wild ===
Tara Stoinski of the Dian Fossey Gorilla Fund made this comment on the television program 60 Minutes (aired 15 March 2015): "I think that humans have a very romantic notion of what the wild is like, and the wild is not a place where it is safe, and animals get to roam free and make choices". She wonders about the value of sending zoo-born animals to Africa and believes that it would be wiser for Aspinall to use his funds to save gorillas already in the wild.

In 2021, the charity was criticized by the Ministry of Tourism and Wildlife of Kenya for not notifying it of plans to rehome a herd of 13 elephants in Kenya.

=== Deaths of gorillas reintroduced into the wild ===
Several of gorillas introduced into Africa died quickly, possibly due to having been primed to humans and being unable to care for themselves in the wild and attacks by other gorillas. One report in 2014 stated that a family of ten zoo-born silverback gorillas were sent to Gabon and at least five were killed, an outcome many had predicted.

In a 2016 interview, chairman Damian Aspinall blamed one gorilla that the foundation had released for killing the five others in 2014. He also criticized the negative publicity about the event stating, "What about the 60 we released that survived? There's no glory if you get it right. We get no press, no publicity – but boy, if anything goes wrong, they jump on you."

=== Stress to animals from hazardous journeys ===
In February 2022, the foundation announced that 13 elephants, born in captivity, would be returned to Kenya and released into the wild. Some experts questioned the wisdom of this strategy, citing issues such as the stress caused by "a hazardous journey", low temperatures at night in Africa, as well as "unfamiliar surroundings, foraging for food, predators and illness". Some concern was also expressed about water quality and the risk of conflict with the human population. The Foundation replied that it "has a 30-year history of successful rewilding projects around the globe".
