= Diving at the 1968 Summer Olympics – Women's 10 metre platform =

Women's 10 metre platform at the Games of the XIX Olympiad
- Date: 22 October (Preliminary); 23 October (Finals)
- Competitors: 24 from 15 nations

Medalists
| 1st place, gold medalist(s) | | Milena Duchková | Czechoslovakia |
| 2nd place, silver medalist(s) | | Natalya Lobanova | Soviet Union |
| 3rd place, bronze medalist(s) | | Ann Peterson | United States |

The women's 10 metre platform, also reported as high diving or platform diving, was one of four diving events on the Diving at the 1968 Summer Olympics programme. It was the 12th appearance of the event, which has been held at every Olympic Games since the 1912 Summer Olympics.

== Competition format ==
The competition was split into two phases:

1. Preliminary round (22 October)
  Divers performed three compulsory dives with limited degrees of difficulty and one voluntary dive without limits. The twelve divers with the highest scores advanced to the final.
2. Final (23 October)
  Divers performed one compulsory dive with a limited degree of difficulty and two voluntary dives without limits. The final ranking was determined by the combined score with the preliminary round.

== Schedule ==
All times are Central Time Zone (UTC-6)

| Date | Time | Round |
|---|---|---|
| Tuesday, 22 October 1968 | 17:00 | Preliminary |
| Wednesday, 23 October 1968 | 17:00 | Final |

== Results ==
| Rank | Diver | Nation | Preliminary | | Final | | | | | |
| Rank | Diver | Nation | Points | Rank | Dive 1 | Dive 2 | Dive 3 | Points | Rank | Total |
|---|---|---|---|---|---|---|---|---|---|---|
| 1st place, gold medalist(s) | Milena Duchková | Czechoslovakia | 51.61 | 3 | 18.46 | 19.24 | 20.28 | 57.98 | 1 | 109.59 |
| 2nd place, silver medalist(s) | Natalya Kuznetsova | Soviet Union | 53.80 | 1 | 17.02 | 15.36 | 18.96 | 51.34 | 3 | 105.14 |
| 3rd place, bronze medalist(s) | Ann Peterson | United States | 52.14 | 2 | 16.12 | 16.06 | 16.79 | 48.97 | 4 | 101.11 |
| 4 | Beverly Boys | Canada | 44.65 | 11 | 22.04 | 16.32 | 14.96 | 53.32 | 2 | 97.97 |
| 5 | Bogusława Pietkiewicz | Poland | 49.53 | 4 | 13.34 | 15.18 | 17.04 | 45.56 | 8 | 95.09 |
| 6 | Regina Krause | West Germany | 46.77 | 8 | 15.08 | 15.36 | 15.87 | 46.31 | 7 | 93.08 |
| 7 | Keiko Osaki | Japan | 45.66 | 10 | 15.41 | 14.49 | 17.52 | 47.42 | 5 | 93.08 |
| 8 | Nancy Robertson | Canada | 44.10 | 12 | 16.90 | 14.30 | 15.36 | 46.56 | 3 | 90.66 |
| 9 | Ingeborg Pertmayr | Austria | 48.23 | 5 | 14.95 | 13.20 | 14.74 | 41.20 | 9 | 89.43 |
| 10 | Barbara Talmage | United States | 47.09 | 7 | 15.34 | 10.56 | 14.30 | 40.20 | 10 | 87.29 |
| 11 | Ingeborg Busch | West Germany | 47.22 | 6 | 14.95 | 14.30 | 9.84 | 38.09 | 11 | 85.31 |
| 12 | Mandi Haswell | Great Britain | 45.72 | 9 | 15.60 | 8.36 | 12.65 | 36.61 | 12 | 82.33 |
| 13 | Bertha Baraldi | Mexico | 47.74 | 13 | did not advance | | | | | |
| 14 | Galina Alekseyeva | Soviet Union | 47.31 | 14 | did not advance | | | | | |
| 15 | Elzbieta Wierniuk | Poland | 47.26 | 15 | did not advance | | | | | |
| 16 | Dora Hernández | Mexico | 46.96 | 16 | did not advance | | | | | |
| 17 | Tarja Liljeström | Finland | 46.39 | 17 | did not advance | | | | | |
| 18 | Robyn Bradshaw | Australia | 45.58 | 18 | did not advance | | | | | |
| 19 | Sylvia Fiedler | East Germany | 43.35 | 19 | did not advance | | | | | |
| 20 | Lesley Bush | United States | 43.72 | 20 | did not advance | | | | | |
| 21 | Bruna Rossi | Italy | 43.54 | 21 | did not advance | | | | | |
| 22 | Nadezhda Karpukhina | Soviet Union | 43.52 | 22 | did not advance | | | | | |
| 23 | Claudia Reiche | East Germany | 41.02 | 23 | did not advance | | | | | |
| 24 | Park Chung-Cha | South Korea | 39.03 | 24 | did not advance | | | | | |

== Sources ==
- Organising Committee of the Games of the XIX Olympiad (1969). The Official Report of the Games of the XIX Olympiad Mexico 1968, Volume 3: The Games (pdf) (in French and English). Mexico: Organising Committee for The Games of the XVIII Olympiad. pp. p. 739.
