= Diving at the 1968 Summer Olympics – Women's 3 metre springboard =

Women's 3 metre springboard at the Games of the XIX Olympiad
- Venue: Alberca Olímpica Francisco Marquéz
- Date: 17 October 1968 (Preliminary); 18 October 1968 (Final)
- Competitors: 22 from 15 nations

Medalists
1st place, gold medalist(s)		Susanne Gossick	United States
2nd place, silver medalist(s)		Tamara Pogosheva	Soviet Union
3rd place, bronze medalist(s)		Keala O'Sullivan	United States

The women's 3 metre springboard, also reported as springboard diving, was one of four diving events on the Diving at the 1968 Summer Olympics programme. It was the 11th appearance of the event, which has been held at every Olympic Games since the 1920 Summer Olympics.

== Competition format ==
The competition was split into two phases:

1. Preliminary round (17 October)
  Divers performed five compulsory dives with limited degrees of difficulty and two voluntary dives without limits. The twelve divers with the highest scores advanced to the final.
2. Final (18 October)
  Divers performed three voluntary dives without limit of degrees of difficulty. The final ranking was determined by the combined score with the preliminary round.

== Schedule ==
All times are Central Time Zone (UTC-6)

Date	Time	Round
Thursday, 17 October 1968	10:00-17:00	Preliminary
Fridau, 18 October 1968	17:00	Final

== Results ==
Rank	Diver	Nation	Preliminary		Final					
Rank	Diver	Nation	Points	Rank	Dive 1	Dive 2	Dive 3	Points	Rank	Total
1st place, gold medalist(s)	Susanne Gossick	United States	97.32	3	16.79	17.68	18.98	53.45	1	150.77
2nd place, silver medalist(s)	Tamara Fyedosova	Soviet Union	97.50	2	10.80	16.72	20.28	47.80	3	145.30
3rd place, bronze medalist(s)	Keala O'Sullivan	United States	95.58	4	14.85	17.42	17.38	49.65	2	145.23
4	Micki King	United States	98.17	1	16.33	15.08	7.80	39.21	8	137.38
5	Ingrid Gulbin	East Germany	90.56	6	14.74	17.52	13.00	45.26	4	135.82
6	Vera Baklanova	Soviet Union	88.89	8	14.96	14.30	14.16	43.42	6	132.31
7	Beverly Boys	Canada	86.86	10	14.07	15.08	14.30	43.45	5	130.31
8	Yelena Anokhina	Soviet Union	90.35	7	12.98	12.24	13.60	38.82	10	129.17
9	Angelika Hilbert	West Germany	86.83	11	14.72	14.52	12.76	42.00	7	128.83
10	Milena Duchková	Czechoslovakia	91.57	5	16.50	7.68	12.10	36.28	11	127.85
11	Elżbieta Wierniuk	Poland	87.62	9	13.20	9.12	12.48	34.80	12	122.42
12	Kathleen Rowlatt	Great Britain	83.12	12	14.74	9.90	14.40	39.04	9	122.16
13	Nancy Robertson	Canada	82.21	13	did not advance					
14	Tarja Liljeström	Finland	81.80	14	did not advance					
15	Robyn Bradshaw	Australia	81.66	15	did not advance					
16	Elselina Kuiler	Netherlands	80.93	16	did not advance					
17	Bertha Baraldi	Mexico	80.47	17	did not advance					
18	Mariette Dommers	Netherlands	79.32	18	did not advance					
19	Ingeborg Pertmayr	Austria	79.08	19	did not advance					
20	Bogusława Pietkiewicz	Poland	76.45	20	did not advance					
21	Park Jeong-ja	South Korea	73.53	21	did not advance					
22	Martha Manzano	Colombia	63.12	22	did not advance					
-	Keiko Osaki	Japan	DNS	-	did not advance					

== Sources ==
- Organising Committee of the Games of the XIX Olympiad (1969). The Official Report of the Games of the XIX Olympiad Mexico 1968, Volume 3: The Games (pdf) (in French and English). Mexico: The Organising Committee for The Games of the XVIII Olympiad. pp. p. 738.
- Diving at the 1968 Ciudad de Mexico Summer Games: Women's Springboard. sports-reference.com
