= Austria at the 1964 Summer Olympics =

- IOC code: AUT
- NOC: Austrian Olympic Committee

in Tokyo
- Competitors: 56 (45 men and 11 women) in 14 sports
- Flag bearer: Hubert Hammerer
- Medals: Gold 0 Silver 0 Bronze 0 Total 0

Summer Olympics appearances (overview)
- 1896; 1900; ~~1904~~; 1908; 1912; 1920; 1924; 1928; 1932; 1936; 1948; 1952; 1956; 1960; 1964; 1968; 1972; 1976; 1980; 1984; 1988; 1992; 1996; 2000; 2004; 2008; 2012; 2016; 2020; 2024; 2028

Other related appearances
- 1906 Intercalated Games

Austria competed at the 1964 Summer Olympics in Tokyo, Japan. 56 competitors, 45 men and 11 women, took part in 54 events in 14 sports.

== Athletics ==
Men:

- 800 metres - Rudolf Klaban (eliminated in second round, 5th place in heat 2)
- 1500 metres - Volker Tulzer (eliminated in first round, 6th place in heat 3)
- 400 metres hurdles - Helmut Haid (eliminated in first round, 6th place in heat 1)
- Discus throw - Ernst Soudek (20th place, first round)
- Hammer throw - Heinrich Thun (15th place)

Women:

- 100 metres - Inge Aigner (eliminated in second round, 7th place in heat 3)
- 200 metres - Inge Aigner (eliminated in first round, 4th place in heat 2)
- 80 metres hurdles - Inge Aigner (eliminated in first round, 6th place in heat 4)
- High jump - Ulla Flegel (eliminated in round 2); Liese Sykora (eliminated in round 1, 21st place)
- Pentathlon - Ulla Flegel (20th place)

== Boxing ==
- Featherweight - Peter Weiss (=17th place)
- Light-welterweight - Rupert König (=17th place)
- Middleweight - Franz Frauenlob (=17th place)

== Canoeing ==
Men:

- Kayak singles, 1000 metres - Günther Pfaff (5th place)
- Kayak doubles, 1000 metres - Kurt Heubusch, Günther Pfaff; Austria did not start
- Kayak fours, 1000 metres - Kurt Heubusch, Kurt Lindlgruber, Günther Pfaff, Ernst Severa

Austria - 4th place, heat 3, round 3

Women:

- Kayak singles, 500 metres - Hanneliese Spitz (6th place)

== Diving ==
Men

Athlete	Event	Preliminary		Final			
Athlete	Event	Points	Rank	Points	Rank	Total	Rank
Kurt Mrkwicka	3 m springboard	85.72	16	Did not advance			
Kurt Mrkwicka	10 m platform	89.10	17	Did not advance			

Women

Athlete	Event	Preliminary		Final			
Athlete	Event	Points	Rank	Points	Rank	Total	Rank
Ingeborg Pertmayr	3 m springboard	74.31	16	Did not advance			
Ulrike Sindelar-Pachowsky	3 m springboard	70.27	18	Did not advance			
Elisabeth Svoboda	3 m springboard	75.45	15	Did not advance			
Ingeborg Pertmayr	10 m platform	49.50	7 Q	43.20	6	92.70	6
Ulrike Sindelar-Pachowsky	10 m platform	40.22	21	Did not advance			
Elisabeth Svoboda	10 m platform	46.10	13	Did not advance			

== Fencing ==
Five fencers, all men, represented Austria in 1964.

Men's foil

- Roland Losert

Men's épée

- Roland Losert
- Rudolf Trost
- Marcus Leyrer

Men's team épée

- Udo Birnbaum, Herbert Polzhuber, Roland Losert, Rudolf Trost, Marcus Leyrer

== Gymnastics ==
Austria was represented by one female gymnast.

- Individual all-around - Henriette Parzer (61st place)
- Floor exercise - Henriette Parzer (56th place)
- Horse vault - Henriette Parzer (=47th place)
- Uneven bars - Henriette Parzer (65th place)
- Balance beam - Henriette Parzer (=62nd place)

== Judo ==
Austria was represented by 6 male judokas.

- Lightweight - Gerhard Zotter (=5th place); Karl Reisinger (=9th place)
- Middleweight - Alfred Redl (=9th place)

Modern Pentathlon:

Individual - Udo Birnbaum (24th place); Rudolf Trost (32nd place); Herbert Polzhuber (33rd place)
Team: Udo Birnbaum, Rudolf Trost, Herbert Polzhuber; Austria - 10th place

== Modern pentathlon ==
Three male pentathletes represented Austria in 1964.

Individual

- Udo Birnbaum
- Rudolf Trost
- Herbert Polzhuber

Team

- Udo Birnbaum
- Rudolf Trost
- Herbert Polzhuber

== Rowing ==
Austria was represented by 7 male rowers.

- Coxed pairs - Alfred Sageder, Josef Kloimstein, Peter Salzbacher; 8th place
- Coxless fours - Dieter Ebner, Horst Kuttelwascher, Dieter Losert, Manfred Krausbar; 8th place

== Sailing ==
Open

Athlete	Event	Race							Net points	Final rank
Athlete	Event	1	2	3	4	5	6	7	Net points	Final rank
Hubert Raudaschl	Finn	~~DNF~~	7	2	9	9	2	9	5405	5
Karl Geiger; Werner Fischer	Flying Dutchman	14	~~DSQ~~	3	10	9	6	3	3706	8

== Shooting ==
Three shooters represented Austria in 1964.

Men

Athlete	Event	Final	
Athlete	Event	Score	Rank
Hubert Hammerer	300 m rifle, three positions	1125	9
Hubert Hammerer	50 m rifle, three positions	1113	31
Hubert Hammerer	50 m rifle, prone	589	28
Josef Meixner	Trap	190	9
Laszlo Szapáry	Trap	173	43

== Swimming ==
Men

Athlete	Event	Heat		Semifinal		Final	
Athlete	Event	Time	Rank	Time	Rank	Time	Rank
Gert Kölli	100 m freestyle	56.5	35	Did not advance			
Gerhard Wieland	100 m freestyle	56.8	=36	Did not advance			
Gert Kölli	400 m freestyle	4:38.4	37	—N/a		Did not advance	
Friedrich Suda	200 m backstroke	2:20.7	21	Did not advance			
Gerhard Wieland	200 m backstroke	2:25.9	28	Did not advance			
Volker Deckardt	200 m butterfly	2:21.3	25	Did not advance			

Women

Athlete	Event	Heat		Semifinal		Final	
Athlete	Event	Time	Rank	Time	Rank	Time	Rank
Christl Paukerl	100 m freestyle	1:07.3	40	Did not advance			
Ursula Seitz	100 m backstroke	1:13.3	26	—N/a		Did not advance	
Christl Filippovits	200 m breaststroke	2:59.2	19	—N/a		Did not advance	

== Weightlifting ==
- Light-heavyweight - Gerhard Hastik (18th place)
- Middle-heavyweight - Kurt Herbst (10th place)
- Heavyweight - Udo Querch (18th place)

== Wrestling ==
Greco-Roman:

- Featherweight - Hans Marte (not placed)
- Lightweight - Franz Berger (not placed)
- Welterweight - Helmut Längle (not placed)
- Light-heavyweight - Eugen Wiesberger, Jr. (not placed)
