= Diving at the 1964 Summer Olympics – Women's 10 metre platform =

Women's 10 metre platform at the Games of the XVIII Olympiad
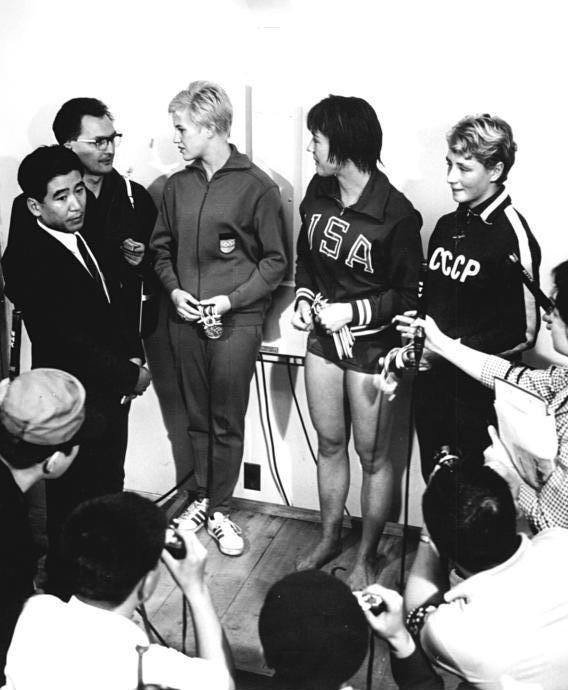

Medalists
1st place, gold medalist(s)		Lesley Bush	United States
2nd place, silver medalist(s)		Ingrid Engel-Krämer	United Team of Germany
3rd place, bronze medalist(s)		Galina Alekseyeva	Soviet Union

The women's 10 metre platform, also reported as high diving, was one of four diving events on the Diving at the 1964 Summer Olympics programme.

The competition was split into two phases:

1. Preliminary round (15 October)
  Divers performed three compulsory dives with limited degrees of difficulty and one voluntary dive without limits. The twelve divers with the highest scores advanced to the final.
2. Final (15 October)
  Divers performed one compulsory dive with limited degrees of difficulty and two voluntary dives without limits. The final ranking was determined by the combined score with the preliminary round.

== Results ==
Rank	Diver	Nation	Preliminary		Final		
Rank	Diver	Nation	Points	Rank	Points	Rank	Total
1st place, gold medalist(s)	Lesley Bush	United States	53.78	1	46.02	2	99.80
2nd place, silver medalist(s)	Ingrid Krämer	United Team of Germany	52.98	3	45.47	3	98.45
3rd place, bronze medalist(s)	Galina Alekseyeva	Soviet Union	53.02	2	44.58	4	97.60
4	Linda Cooper	United States	47.80	9	48.50	1	96.30
5	Christiane Lanzke	United Team of Germany	49.69	6	43.23	5	92.92
6	Ingeborg Pertmayr	Austria	49.50	7	43.20	6	92.70
7	Natalya Kuznetsova	Soviet Union	49.89	5	41.02	9	90.91
8	Barbara Talmage	United States	47.28	11	42.32	7	89.60
9	Robyn Bradshaw	Australia	46.58	12	41.58	8	88.16
10	Delia Reinhard	United Team of Germany	47.83	8	38.96	10	86.79
11	Carol Ann Morrow	Canada	47.62	10	38.52	11	86.14
12	Tatyana Dzheneyeva	Soviet Union	51.91	4	33.09	12	85.00
13	Elisabeth Svoboda	Austria	46.10	13	did not advance		
14	Frances Cramp	Great Britain	45.48	14	did not advance		
15	Keiko Osaki	Japan	45.20	15	did not advance		
16	Hatsuko Kawai-Hirose	Japan	45.00	16	did not advance		
17	Kirsten Velin	Denmark	43.85	17	did not advance		
18	Kumiko Watanabe	Japan	43.50	18	did not advance		
19	Joy Newman	Great Britain	42.72	19	did not advance		
20	Susan Knight	Australia	41.84	20	did not advance		
21	Ulrike Sindelar-Pachowsky	Austria	40.22	21	did not advance		
22	Sarie Bezuidenhout	Rhodesia	37.59	22	did not advance		
23	Judy Stewart	Canada	36.47	23	did not advance		
24	Jeong Sun-ja	South Korea	33.57	24	did not advance		
