= Karpukhin =

Karpukhin (masculine, Russian: Карпухин) or Karpukhina (feminine, Russian: Карпухина) is a Russian surname. Notable people with the surname include:

- Artur Karpukhin (born 1995), Russian soccer player
- Elena Karpukhina (born 1951), Russian rhythmic gymnast
- Nadezhda Karpukhina (born 1949), Soviet diver
- Viktor Karpukhin (disambiguation), multiple people
