= Diving at the 1968 Summer Olympics =

Diving at the Games of the XIX Olympiad
- Venue: Alberca Olímpica Francisco Márquez
- Dates: 17–26 October 1968
- No. of events: 4
- Competitors: 81 from 21 nations

The diving competitions at the 1968 Summer Olympics in Mexico City featured four events. It was one of three aquatic sports at the Games, along with swimming, and water polo.

The events were men's and women's versions of 3m springboard and 10m platform.

The diving competitions featured up to 81 athletes.

== Schedule ==
Legend

H	Heats	F	Finals

Date	Oct 17		Oct 18		Oct 19		Oct 20		Oct 21		Oct 22		Oct 23		Oct 24		Oct 25		Oct 26	
Event	M	A	M	A	M	A	M	A	M	A	M	A	M	A	M	A	M	A	M	A
Men's 3m springboard						H	H	F												
Men's 10m platform																H		H		F
Women's 3m springboard	H		F																	
Women's 10m platform												H		F						

== Medalists ==
=== Medal table ===
Rank	Nation	Gold	Silver	Bronze	Total
1	United States	2	0	4	6
2	Italy	1	1	0	2
3	Czechoslovakia	1	0	0	1
4	Soviet Union	0	2	0	2
5	Mexico	0	1	0	1
Totals (5 entries)		4	4	4	12

The events are named according to the International Olympic Committee labelling, but they appeared on the official report as "springboard diving" and "high diving" (or "platform diving"), respectively.

=== Men ===
Event	Gold	Silver	Bronze
3 m springboard	Bernard Wrightson; United States	Klaus Dibiasi; Italy	Jim Henry; United States
10 m platform	Klaus Dibiasi; Italy	Alvaro Gaxiola; Mexico	Win Young; United States

=== Women ===
Event	Gold	Silver	Bronze
3 m springboard	Susanne Gossick; United States	Tamara Pogozheva; Soviet Union	Keala O'Sullivan; United States
10 m platform	Milena Duchková; Czechoslovakia	Natalya Lobanova; Soviet Union	Ann Peterson; United States

== Participating nations ==
This is a list of the nations that were represented in the diving events and, in brackets, the number of national competitors.

- Australia (2)
- Austria (1)
- Canada (4)
- Colombia (3)
- Cuba (2)
- Czechoslovakia (1)
- Dominican Republic (1)
- East Germany (5)
- Finland (2)
- Great Britain (5)
- Guatemala (1)
- Italy (4)
- Japan (4)
- Mexico (6)
- Netherlands (2)
- Norway (1)
- Poland (5)
- Puerto Rico (2)
- South Korea (2)
- Soviet Union (10)
- Sweden (1)
- United States (11)
- West Germany (8)

== See also ==
- Diving at the 1967 Pan American Games
