= Galina Alekseyeva =

Galina Alekseyeva may refer to:

- Galina Kreft (1950–2005), later Galina Kreft-Alekseyeva, Soviet sprint canoer
- Galina Alekseyeva (diver) (1947–2024), Russian diver
