= Mikhail Safonov (diver) =

Soviet diver

Personal information
- Born: 7 January 1947 (age 79) Moscow, Soviet Union
- Height: 1.78 m (5 ft 10 in)
- Weight: 78 kg (172 lb)

Sport
- Sport: Diving
- Club: Spartak Moscow
Medal record
Representing the Soviet Union
European Championships
Gold medal – first place	1966 Utrecht	Springboard
Summer Universiade
Bronze medal – third place	1965 Budapest	Springboard

Mikhail Mikhailovich Safonov (Russian: Михаил Михайлович Сафонов, born 7 January 1947) is a retired Soviet diver. He competed in the 3 m springboard at the 1964 and 1968 Summer Olympics and finished in seventh and ninth place, respectively; in 1968 he also finished ninth in the 10 m platform. He won the springboard event at the 1966 European Aquatics Championships and at the Soviet championships in 1966–1968 and 1971.

He was married Tamara Safonova, a Soviet diver who also competed at the 1964 and 1968 Olympics.
