= Delia Reinhardt =

Delia Reinhardt may refer to:

- Delia Reinhardt (diver)
- Delia Reinhardt (soprano)
