= Rick Gilbert =

American diver

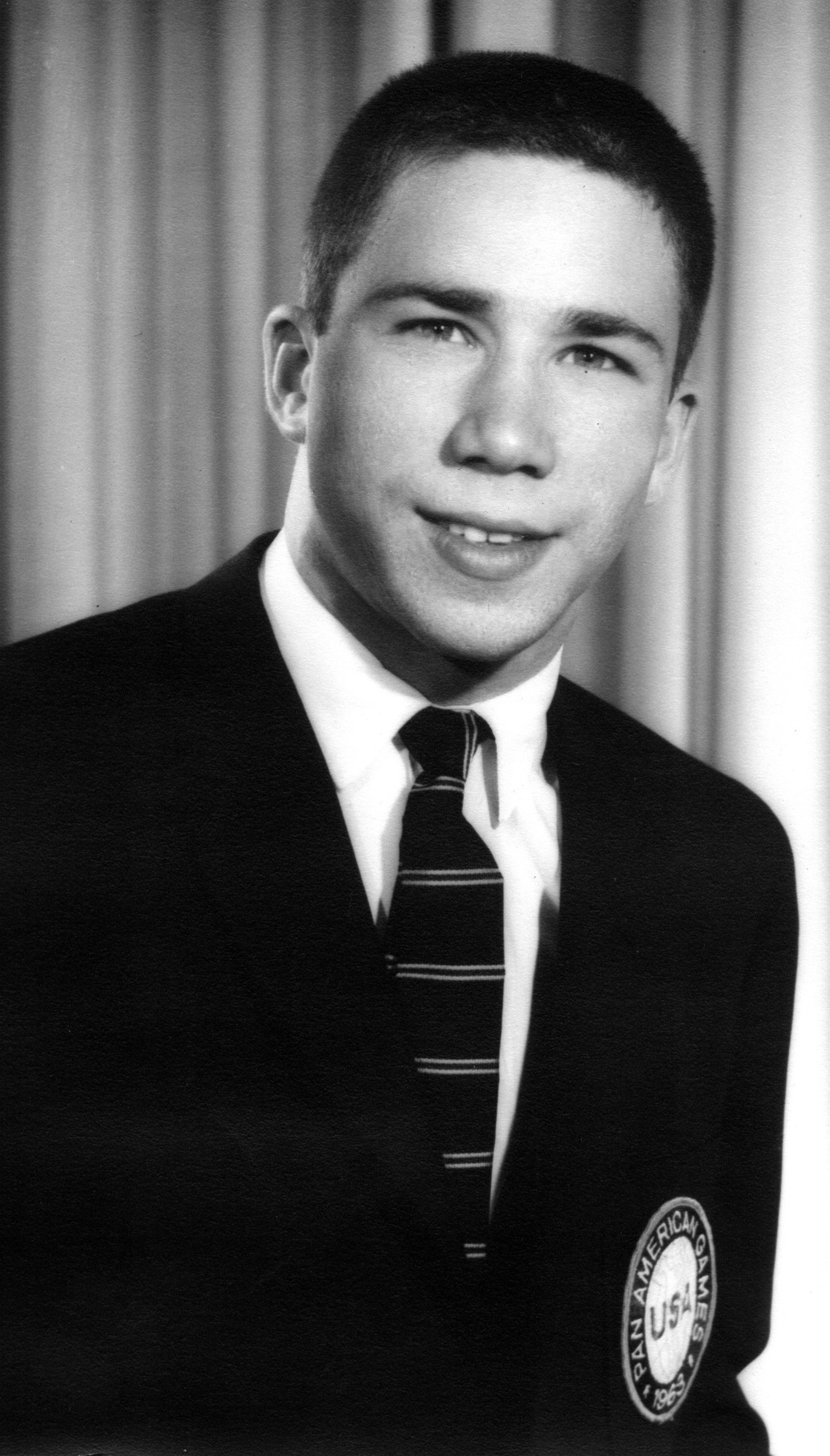
- Gilbert in 1963

Personal information
- Full name: Richard Walter Gilbert
- Born: September 23, 1943 Lancaster, Pennsylvania, U.S.
- Height: 5 ft 7 in (1.69 m)
- Weight: 146 lb (66 kg)
Medal record
Men's diving
Representing the United States
Pan American Games
Silver medal – second place	1963 São Paulo	3m springboard
Universiade
Gold medal – first place	1965 Budapest	3m springboard
Gold medal – first place	1965 Budapest	10m platform

Richard Walter Gilbert (born September 23, 1943) is an American former diver and coach who competed in the 1968 Summer Olympics. He was born in Lancaster, Pennsylvania. He won two World University (FISU) Games gold medals, was silver medalist on 3-meter in the 1963 Pan American Games and amassed five Big Ten and seven national titles while at Indiana University. He was a six-time NCAA All-American and four-time AAU All-American and won one NCAA and six national AAU titles. Gilbert was on the 1968 United States Olympic Team that competed in Mexico City. After Mexico City, he became coach of diving at Cornell University, where he coached 39 years until his retirement in 2007. Gilbert was named Eastern Intercollegiate Swimming League Women's Diving Coach of the Year in 1991, 1992 and 1993 and Men's Diving Coach of the Year in 1984. He was chairman of the NCAA Diving Rules Sub-Committee from 1976 to 1980. He was inducted into the Pennsylvania Sports Hall of Fame in 1973, the Indiana University Athletic Hall of Fame in 1997, and into the Pennsylvania Aquatics Hall of Fame in 2019.

== High school ==
Gilbert graduated from McCaskey High School in Lancaster, Pennsylvania, where he was a three-time PIAA state diving champion and two-time Eastern Interscholastic Champion. Gilbert only lost one high school meet during his four years of high school, when he finished second, seven tenths of a point behind the winner. He was 7th in the one-meter National AAU Championships held at Yale University his senior year in high school. After graduating in 1962, Gilbert enrolled at Indiana University. He was named to the McCaskey High School Hall of Fame in October, 1987.

== At Indiana University ==
Gilbert dived for the legendary coach Hobie Billingsley at Indiana, after being heavily recruited to become the cornerstone of Billingsley's emerging program. While Gilbert was the cornerstone, his success enabled Billingsley to attract additional top-tier divers including Lesley Bush, Ken Sitzberger, Cynthia Potter, Win Young, Jim Henry and Mark Lenzi. Despite the fact that Indiana was on probation when Gilbert was recruited, he chose Indiana after being assured by 1956 Olympic springboard Champion Bobby Clotworthy that Hobie and the Hoosiers were an emerging force. In 1962, Gilbert won the AAU 3-meter title, the first freshman in 25 years to win the event. At the time, freshmen were ineligible for Varsity collegiate NCAA competition. In his junior season, Gilbert became Big Ten champion on both one- and 3-meter boards, and the NCAA 1-meter champion, both of which were Billingsley and Indiana University firsts. He repeated his Big Ten sweep as a senior. Gilbert amassed five Big Ten and one NCAA title while at Indiana, plus six national AAU titles. He was a three-year collegiate All-American. Gilbert was named a member of the Indiana University Athletics Hall of Fame in 1997, having won diving letters in 1963, 1964, and 1965. His cumulative awards during his Indiana years included six NCAA All-American Honors, four NAAU All-American Honors, one and 3-meter Big Ten titles, the NCAA 1-meter championship in 1964, and four NAAU indoor and two NAAU outdoor titles, in addition to the 3-meter and 10-meter titles at the World University (FISU) Games in Budapest in 1965, and the 3- meter Silver medal in the 1963 Pan American Games.

== 1968 U.S. Olympic Team ==
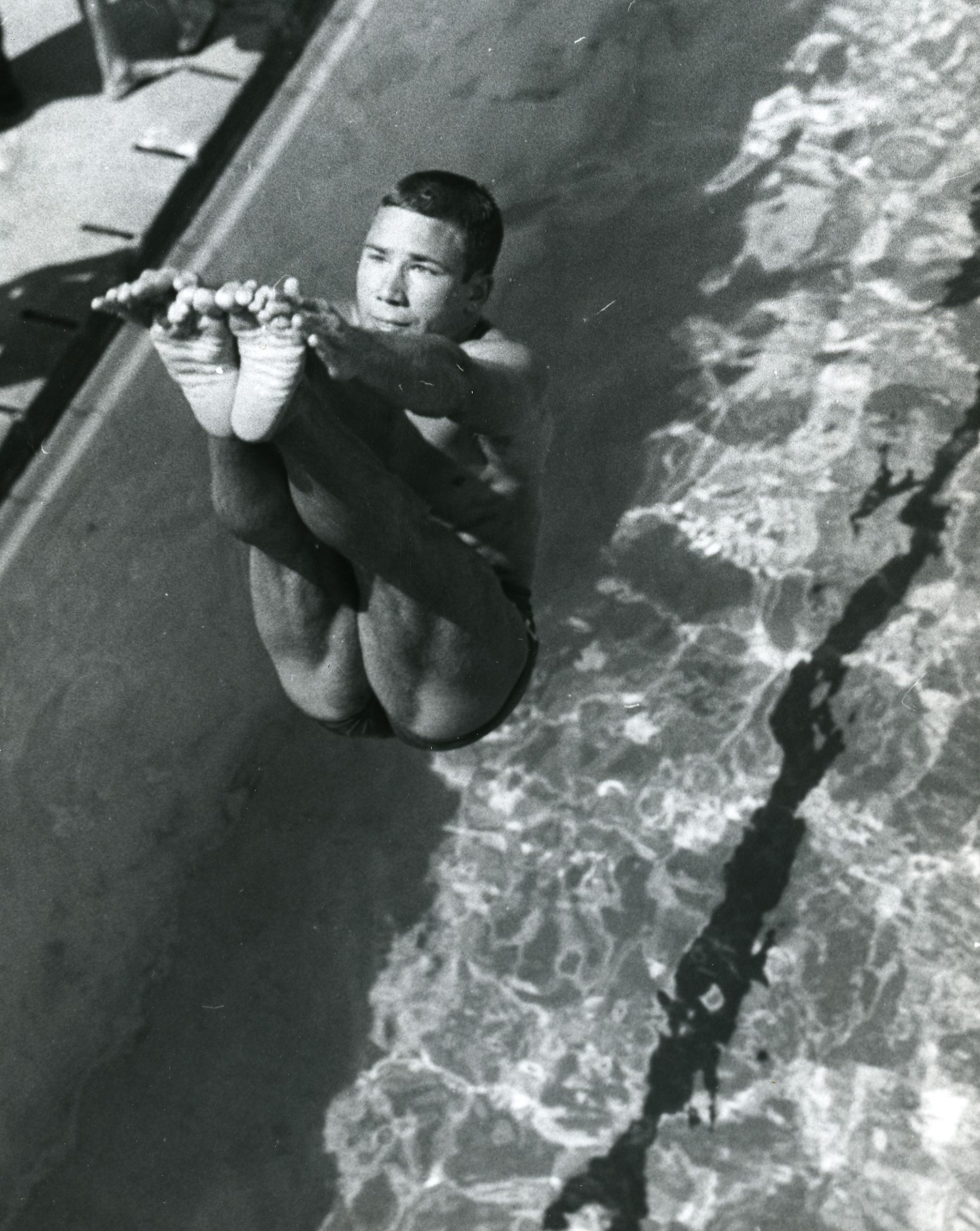
Rick Gilbert performs a back dive in Tehran, Iran, 1965

After narrowly missing the team for the 1964 Tokyo Olympics, Gilbert was named to the 1968 Olympic team for the 10-meter platform. While in Mexico City awaiting the start of the Games, he sprained his ankle, but still managed to place 17th after initially being favored to finish much higher.

== At Cornell University ==
Rick provided 39 years of distinguished service to Cornell University athletics, where he coached and inspired generations of Cornell divers, while guiding the athletic and academic demands of Cornell's student athletes. His divers won 12 Eastern titles and four earned All-American status. Gilbert was named Eastern Intercollegiate Swimming League Women's Diving Coach of the Year in 1991, 1992 and 1993 and Men's Diving Coach of the Year in 1984. He was Chairman of the NCAA Diving Rules Sub-Committee from 1976 to 1981. As a result of Gilbert's influence on the sport and the many students, Bob and Maura Dughi named “The Richard W. Gilbert Diving Coach” chair in Gilbert's honor, and permanently endowed Cornell's diving coach position.

It was not only Cornell students who dived with Gilbert over 39 years. Starting in the early 1970s, he created the Rick Gilbert Diving Camp. This nationally recognized camp attracted age group and high school students from all over the country. There were national and international caliber divers who went to train with Gilbert during the summer and school year, including Phil Boggs, a 1976 Olympic Gold Medalist. These divers benefited from Gilbert's tutelage and included many future Cornell divers.

== Personal impact and legacy ==
One of Gilbert's most direct impacts is that many of his divers have gone on to coach diving themselves, paying back some of what Rick modeled and taught.

Gilbert's coaching emphasized athlete development and long-term relationships with divers. Together with his wife, Jo, he maintained contact with many former athletes, and diving reunions have brought together multiple generations of divers from his program.
