= Ann Peterson =

American diver

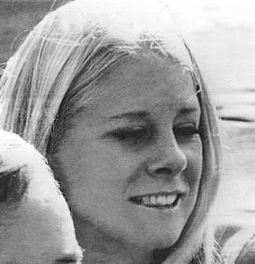
- Peterson at the 1968 Summer Olympics

Personal information
- Born: June 16, 1947 (age 79) Kansas City, Missouri, US
- Education: Arizona State University
- Height: 160 cm (5 ft 3 in)
- Weight: 52 kg (115 lb)

Sport
- Sport: Diving
- Club: Gold Creek Swim Gym & Dick Smith Swim Gym
Medal record
Representing the United States
Olympic Games
Bronze medal – third place	1968 Mexico City	10 m platform
Pan American Games
Bronze medal – third place	1967 Winnipeg	10 m platform

Ann Stewart Peterson (born June 16, 1947) is an American diver who competed in the 10 meter platform event. She won bronze medals at both the 1967 Pan American Games and 1968 Olympics. Peterson won the Amateur Athletic Union championships and the U.S. Olympic trials in 1968.

== Early life ==
Peterson began participating in competitive diving in 1957 with Dick Smith's Swim Gym, but quit in 1960 to move with her parents to Seattle, Washington. She joined the Gold Creek Swim Gym after arriving in Washington. Prior to Peterson's stint in the Olympics, she won the Junior National Amateur Athletic Union Women's 3 meter diving championship in Arizona in 1962, with a score of 394.60 points.

== Diving ==
=== 1967 Pan American Games ===
Peterson received the bronze medal at the 1967 Pan American Games in the women's 10-meter platform diving championship, losing to gold medal winner American Lesley Bush and silver medal winner Canadian Beverly Boys. Bush received a score of 541.0 points, Boys received a score of 515.45 points, and Peterson received 491.50 points.

=== 1967 National Intercollegiate Championships ===
Peterson won two gold medals for diving at the 1967 National Intercollegiate Championships later in the same year that she participated in the 1967 Pan American Games.

=== 1968 Summer Olympics ===
In 1968, Peterson attended Arizona State University studying physical education. During this time, she gained a spot on the United States' Olympic diving team by competing in the women's 10 meter platform competition for the Olympic trials. It was reported by The Arizona Republic the day after Peterson's win that "the mark of Miss Peterson's performance last night was consistency". She was in the lead going into the finals with 169.86 points, later adding 46.74 points, 50.82 points, and 51.75 points to her last three dives. Before this accomplishment, Peterson had not dived for six years. She was the first athlete during the three-day Olympic trials to take first place in both the preliminaries and finals. Lesley Bush, who previously scored eighth place in the event at the 1964 Olympics in Tokyo, placed second.

During the 1968 Summer Olympics in Mexico City, she won a bronze medal in the women's 10 meter platform. Peterson's diving was the first footage of the 1968 Summer Olympics coverage to be aired by ABC in the eastern United States.
