= Jerzy Kowalewski =

Polish diver

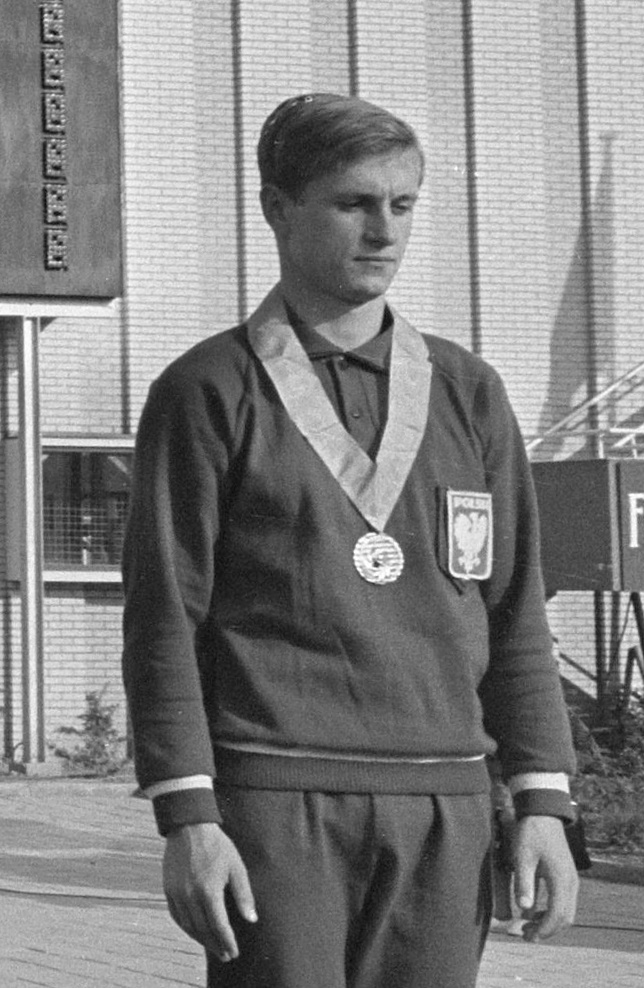
- Jerzy Kowalewski in 1966

Personal information
- Born: 6 May 1944 (age 82) Wołkowysk, Soviet Union
- Height: 1.72 m (5 ft 8 in)
- Weight: 68 kg (150 lb)

Sport
- Sport: Diving
- Club: MKS Pałac Młodzieży Warsaw/Legia Warsaw
Medal record
Representing Poland
European Championships
Bronze medal – third place	1966 Utrecht	Platform
Summer Universiade
Bronze medal – third place	1965 Budapest	Platform

Jerzy Kowalewski (born 6 May 1944) is a retired Polish diver. He competed in the 3 m springboard and 10 m platform at the 1960 and 1968 Summer Olympics with the best achievement of 15th place in the platform in 1960. He won a bronze medal in the platform at the 1966 European Aquatics Championships. Nationally, he won six titles in the springboard (1959, 1962, 1963, 1965, 1966, 1967) and six in the platform (1959, 1963, 1965, 1966, 1967, 1970).

Kowalewski graduated from a medical university in Warsaw. Since 1970 he lives in Canada where he owns a clinic in Toronto. He is married to Anita Kowalewski; they have a son Daniel (born 1980) and a daughter Agate.
