= Irina Pozdnyakova =

Russian swimmer (born 1953)

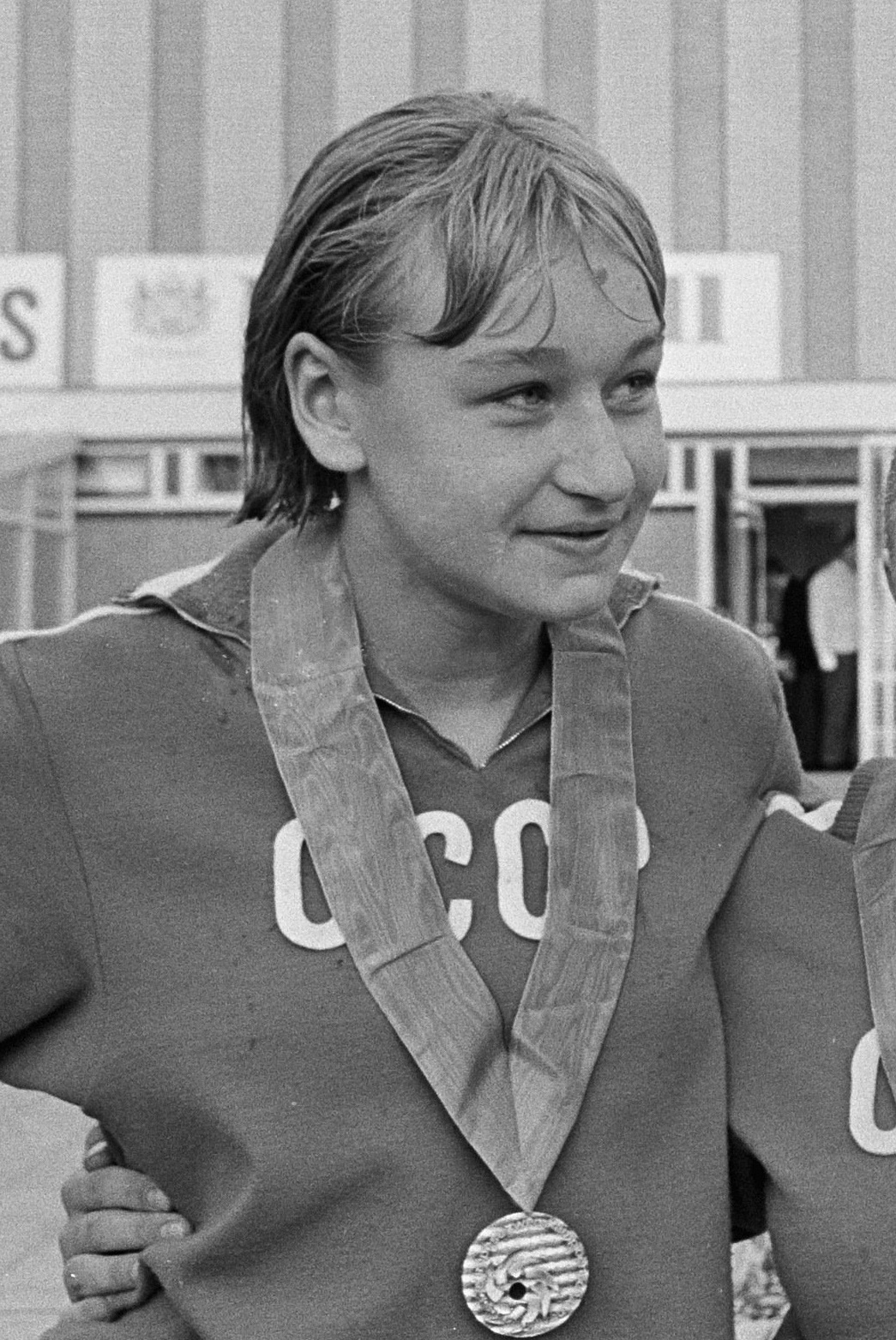
- Irina Pozdnyakova in 1966

Personal information
- Born: 29 April 1953 (age 73) Moscow, Soviet Union

Sport
- Sport: Swimming
- Club: Dynamo Moscow (1965–1972)
Medal record
Swimming
European Championships
Representing Soviet Union
Silver medal – second place	1966 Utrecht	200 m breaststroke
European Junior Championships
Representing Soviet Union
Gold medal – first place	1967 Linköping	100 m breaststroke
Gold medal – first place	1967 Linköping	200 m breaststroke

Irina Valentinovna Pozdnyakova (Russian: Ирина Валентиновна Позднякова; born 29 April 1953) is a retired Russian swimmer. In 1966, aged 13, she set a world record in the 200 m breaststroke. The same year she won a silver medal at the 1966 European Aquatics Championships.

She was married to the Olympic volleyball player Vyacheslav Zaytsev who died in 2023; they have a daughter, Anna (born 1975), and a son, Ivan, an Olympic volleyball player. Both children hold Italian citizenship: Ivan was born on 2 October 1988 in Italy, where his father played for several years, whereas Anna married an Italian in 1993.
