= Leonid Ilyichev (swimmer) =

Soviet swimmer (born 1948)

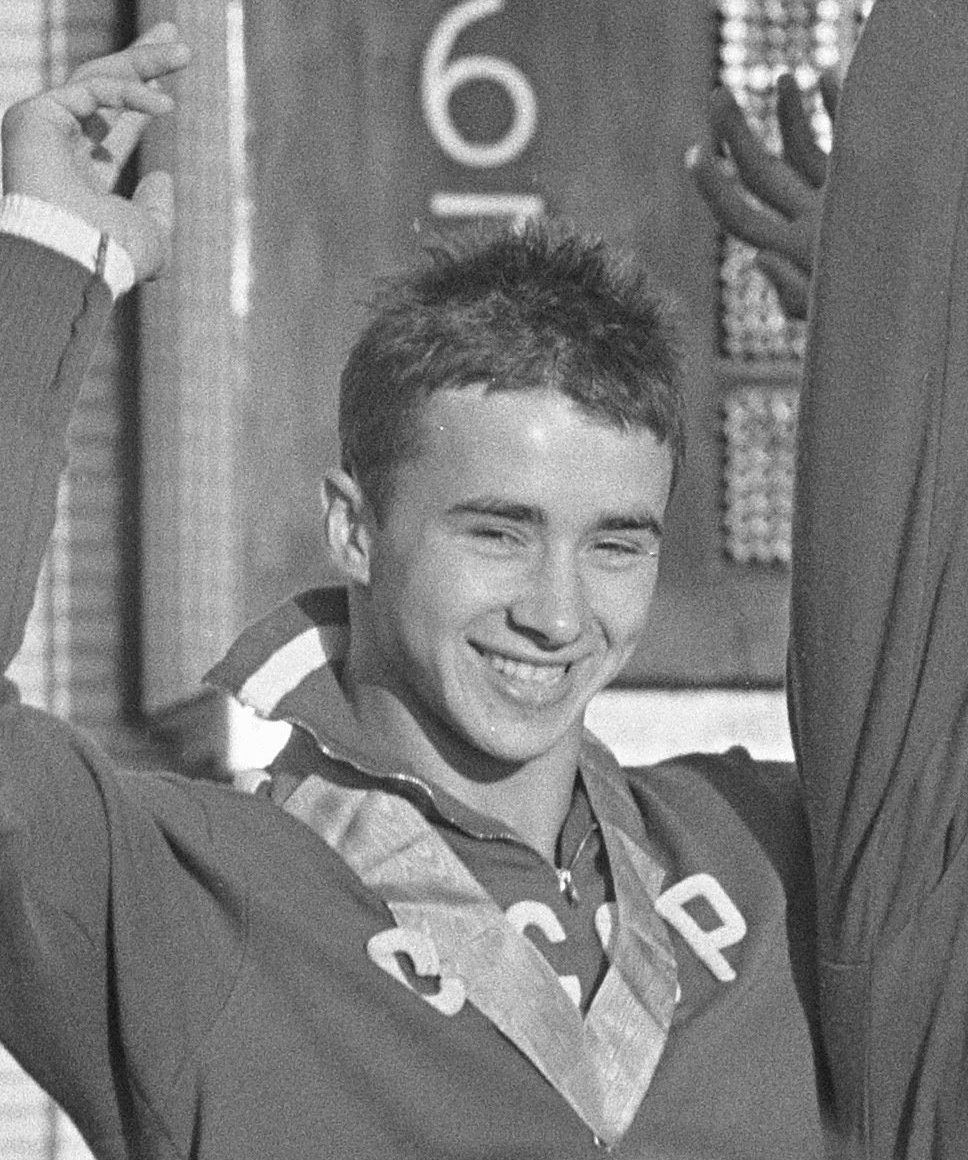
- Ilyichov in 1966

Personal information
- Born: 30 January 1948 (age 78) Norilsk, Russian SFSR, Soviet Union
- Height: 1.84 m (6 ft 0 in)
- Weight: 86 kg (190 lb)

Sport
- Club: Trud Moskva
Medal record
Men's swimming
Representing the Soviet Union
Olympic Games
Silver medal – second place	1968 Mexico City	4×100 m freestyle
Bronze medal – third place	1968 Mexico City	4×200 m freestyle
Bronze medal – third place	1968 Mexico City	4×100 m medley
European Championships
Gold medal – first place	1966 Utrecht	4×100 m medley
Gold medal – first place	1966 Utrecht	4×200 m freestyle
Gold medal – first place	1970 Barcelona	4×100 m freestyle
Silver medal – second place	1966 Utrecht	4×100 m freestyle
Silver medal – second place	1966 Utrecht	100 m freestyle
Bronze medal – third place	1970 Barcelona	4×100 m medley
Universiade
Bronze medal – third place	1970 Turin	100m freestyle

Leonid Georgiyevich Ilyichev (Russian: Леонид Георгиевич Ильичёв, also Ilyichov; born 30 January 1948) is a retired Russian freestyle swimmer. He competed in five events at the 1968 Summer Olympics and won three team medals; individually, he finished fifth in the 100 m freestyle. He also won six European medals in 1966 and 1970, five in team events, and one individual, a silver in the 100 m freestyle.
