= Martha Manzano =

Colombian diver

Personal information
- Nationality: Colombian
- Born: 1 July 1953 (age 71); Cali, Colombia

Sport
- Sport: Diving

Martha Manzano (born 1 July 1953) is a Colombian diver. She competed in the women's 3 metre springboard event at the 1968 Summer Olympics. She was the first woman to represent Colombia at the Olympics.
