= Anatoly Skavronsky =

Soviet swimmer (born 1940)

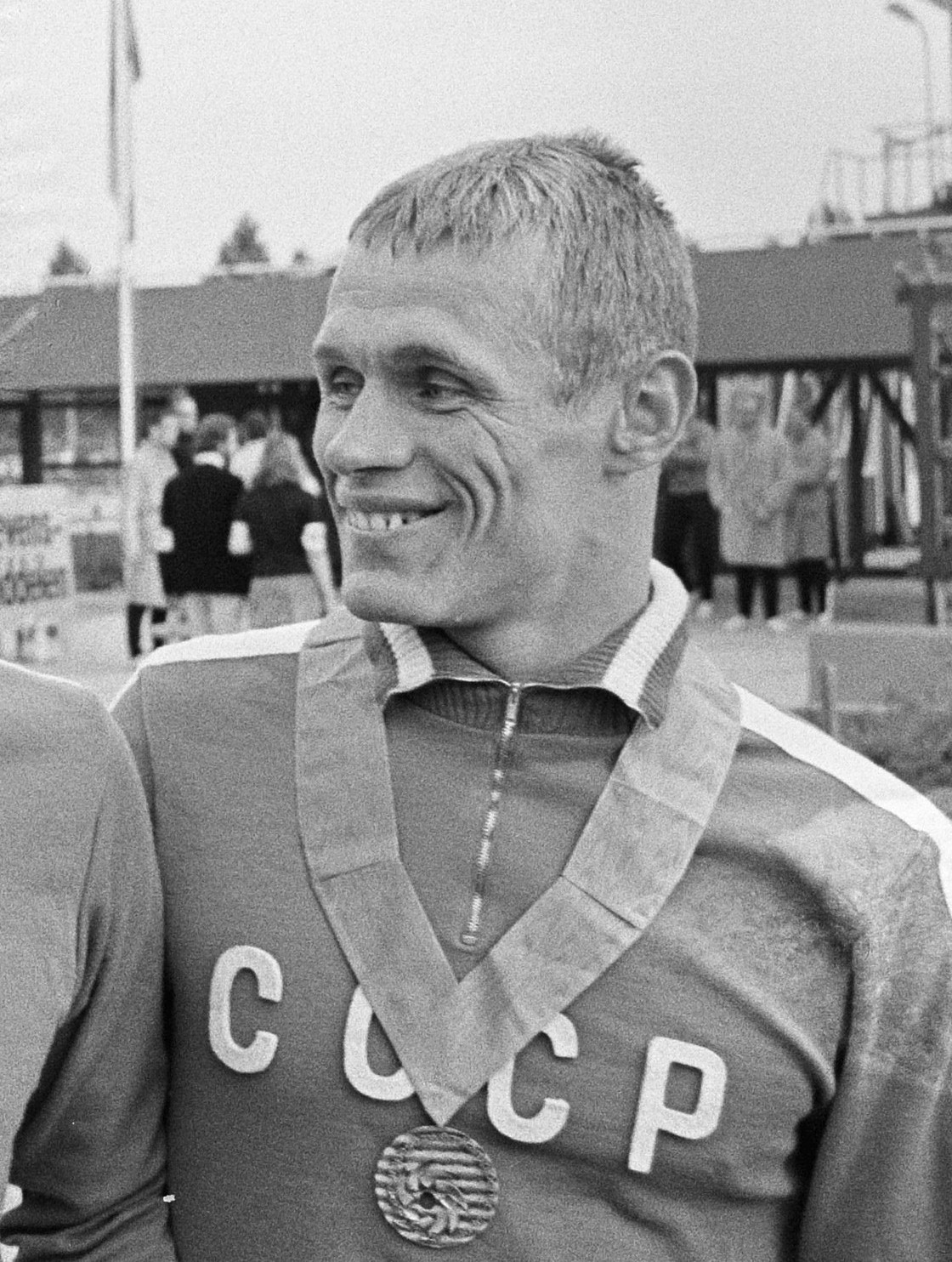
- Skavronsky in 1966

Personal information
- Born: 1940 (age 85–86) Kiev, USSR

Sport
- Sport: Swimming
- Club: Sport Club of the Army (SCA)
Medal record
Representing Soviet Union
European Championships
Bronze medal – third place	1966 Utrecht	200 m butterfly

Anatoly Skavronsky (Russian: Анатолий Скавронский; born 1940) is a retired Soviet swimmer who won a bronze medal in the 200 m butterfly event at the 1966 European Aquatics Championships.
