= Bogusława Pietkiewicz =

Polish diver (1944–2012)

Personal information
- Born: 16 August 1944 Sokołów Podlaski, Poland
- Died: 27 January 2012 (aged 67) Bridgeport, Connecticut, U.S.

Sport
- Country: Poland
- Sport: Diving
Medal record
Women's diving
Representing Poland
Summer Universiade
Gold medal – first place	1965 Budapest	Springboard
Silver medal – second place	1965 Budapest	Platform

Bogusława Pietkiewicz (16 August 1944 – 27 January 2012) was a Polish diver. She competed in two events at the 1968 Summer Olympics.
