= Betty Heukels =

Dutch swimmer (born 1942)

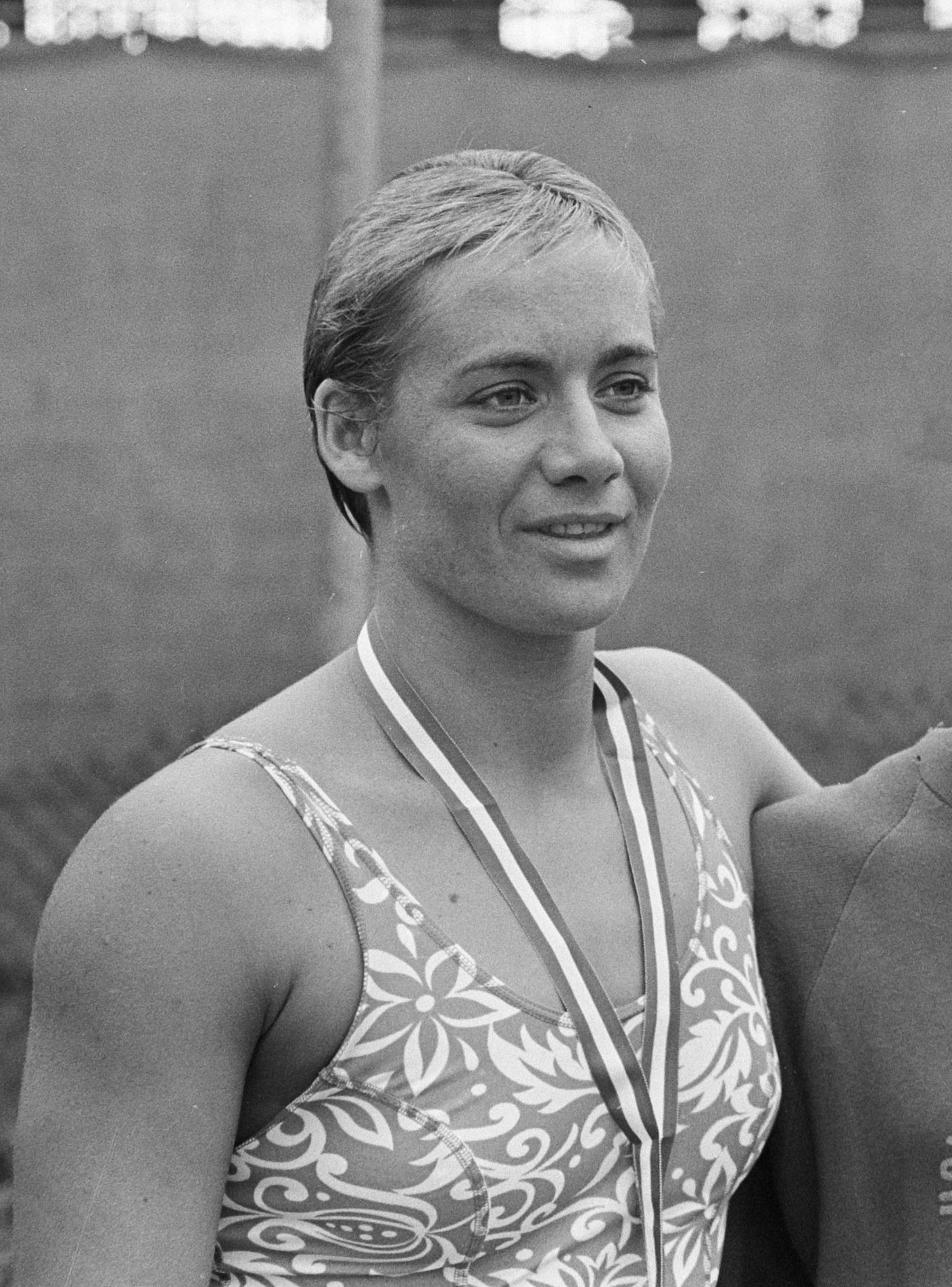
- Betty Heukels in 1968

Personal information
- Born: 25 February 1942 (age 84) Rotterdam, the Netherlands
- Height: 1.71 m (5 ft 7 in)
- Weight: 63 kg (139 lb)
- Spouse: Hans Wouda

Sport
- Sport: Swimming
- Strokes: Medley
- Club: PSV, Eindhoven
Medal record
Representing the Netherlands
European Championships (LC)
Gold medal – first place	1966 Utrecht	400 m medley

Elisabeth ("Betty") Anna Heukels (born 25 February 1942) is a retired medley swimmer from the Netherlands, who finished in sixth place in the 400 m individual medley at the 1964 Summer Olympics in Tokyo. She is married to former water polo player Hans Wouda, who competed for Holland at the 1968 and the 1972 Summer Olympics. She won the individual 400 m medley at the 1966 European Aquatics Championships.
