= Lyudmila Khazieva =

Ukrainian swimmer

Personal information
- Born: 3 November 1947 Kharkiv, Ukrainian SSR, Soviet Union
- Died: 26 August 2018 (aged 70) Kyiv, Ukraine

Sport
- Sport: Swimming
- Club: Dynamo Kharkiv
Medal record
Representing the Soviet Union
European Championships
Bronze medal – third place	1966 Utrecht	400 m medley

Lyudmila Khazieva (Russian: Людмила Валиевна Хазиева; 3 November 1947 – 26 August 2018) was a Soviet swimmer. She won a bronze medal in the 400 medley event at the 1966 European Aquatics Championships, as well as six national titles between 1964 and 1966, mostly in medley events. She continued competing during the 1990s and won another national title in the masters category in 1992.

Khazieva was born in Kharkiv and graduated from the Kharkiv Polytechnic Institute. In Kharkiv she married the renowned Soviet water polo player Alexei Barkalov and changed her last name to Barkalova (Russian: Баркалова). They had a son Dmitri (1969–2001), also a competitive water polo player.
