= Tatyana Dzheneyeva =

Soviet diver

Personal information
- Nationality: Soviet
- Born: 14 December 1944 (age 80)

Sport
- Sport: Diving

Tatyana Dzheneyeva (born 4 October 1946) is a Soviet diver. She competed in the women's 10 metre platform event at the 1964 Summer Olympics.
