= Diving at the 1965 Summer Universiade =

The Diving competition in the 1965 Summer Universiade in Budapest, Hungary.

== Medal overview ==
Event	Gold	Silver	Bronze
Men's 3-Meter Springboard	Rick Gilbert (USA)	Bernard Wrightson (USA)	Mikhail Safonov (URS)
Men's Platform	Rick Gilbert (USA)	Bernard Wrightson (USA)	Jerzy Kowalewski (POL)
Women's 3-Meter Springboard	Bogusława Marcinkowska (POL)	Lesley Bush (USA)	Imstraud Lurf (AUT)
Women's Platform	Joy Newman (GBR)	Bogusława Marcinkowska (POL)	Szuzsanna Sziegethy (HUN)

== Medal table ==
* Host nation (Hungary)

Rank	Nation	Gold	Silver	Bronze	Total
1	United States (USA)	2	3	0	5
2	Poland (POL)	1	1	1	3
3	Great Britain (GBR)	1	0	0	1
4	Austria (AUT)	0	0	1	1
4	Hungary (HUN)	0	0	1	1
4	Soviet Union (URS)	0	0	1	1
Totals (6 entries)		4	4	4	12
