= Regina Krause =

German diver (born 1949)

Personal information
- Nationality: German
- Born: 22 March 1949 (age 77) Celle, Germany

Sport
- Sport: Diving

Regina Krause (born 22 March 1949) is a German diver. She competed in the women's 10 metre platform event at the 1968 Summer Olympics.
