= Keith Russell (diver) =

American diver (born 1948)

Personal information
- Full name: John Keith Russell
- Born: January 15, 1948 (age 78) Mesa, Arizona, U.S.
Medal record
Men's diving
Representing United States
World Championships
Silver medal – second place	1973 Belgrade	Platform
Bronze medal – third place	1973 Belgrade	Springboard
Pan American Games
Silver medal – second place	1967 Winnipeg	Springboard
Universiade
Gold medal – first place	1967 Tokyo	Springboard
Silver medal – second place	1967 Tokyo	Platform

John Keith Russell (born January 15, 1948) is an American former diver who competed in the 1968 Summer Olympics in the 3-meter springboard and 10-meter platform.

== Personal life ==
Russell is a member of the Church of Jesus Christ of Latter-day Saints.
