= Mirjam van Hemert =

Dutch swimmer (born 1950)

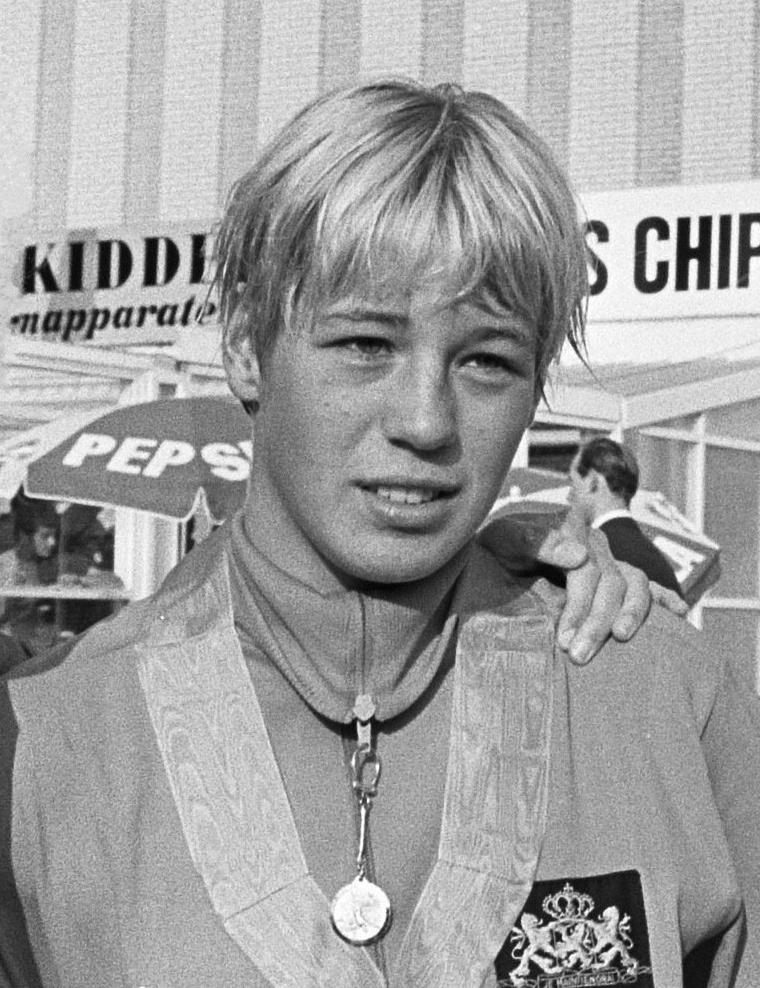
- Mirjam van Hemert in 1966

Personal information
- Born: 30 September 1950 (age 75) Vlaardingen, Netherlands
- Height: 1.70 m (5 ft 7 in)
- Weight: 60 kg (130 lb)

Sport
- Club: KNZB
Medal record
Women's swimming
Representing the Netherlands
European Championships
Bronze medal – third place	1966 Utrecht	4×100 m freestyle

Mirjam van Hemert (born 30 September 1950) is a retired Dutch swimmer who won a bronze medal in the 4×100 m freestyle relay at the 1966 European Aquatics Championships. She also competed at the 1968 Summer Olympics in the 100 m freestyle and 4×100 m freestyle relay, but failed to reach the finals. She won a national title in the 100 m freestyle in 1968.
