= Antonina Rudenko =

Soviet swimmer (born 1950)

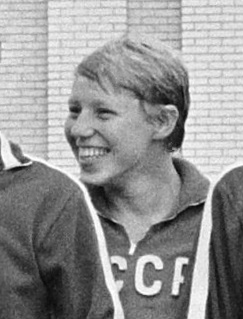
- Rudenko in 1966

Personal information
- Born: 28 May 1950 (age 76) Yalta, Crimean Oblast, Russian SFSR, Soviet Union

Sport
- Sport: Swimming
- Club: Spartak
Medal record
Representing Soviet Union
European Championships
Gold medal – first place	1966 Utrecht	4×100 m freestyle
Silver medal – second place	1966 Utrecht	4×100 m medley

Antonina Rudenko (Russian: Антонина Павловна Руденко, Ukrainian: Антоніна Павлівна Руденко; born 28 May 1950) is a retired Soviet swimmer who won a gold medal in the 4×100 m freestyle relay at the 1966 European Aquatics Championships, setting a new European record. She also won a silver medal in the 4×100 m medley relay at the same championships.
