= Hans Wouda =

Dutch water polo player (born 1941)

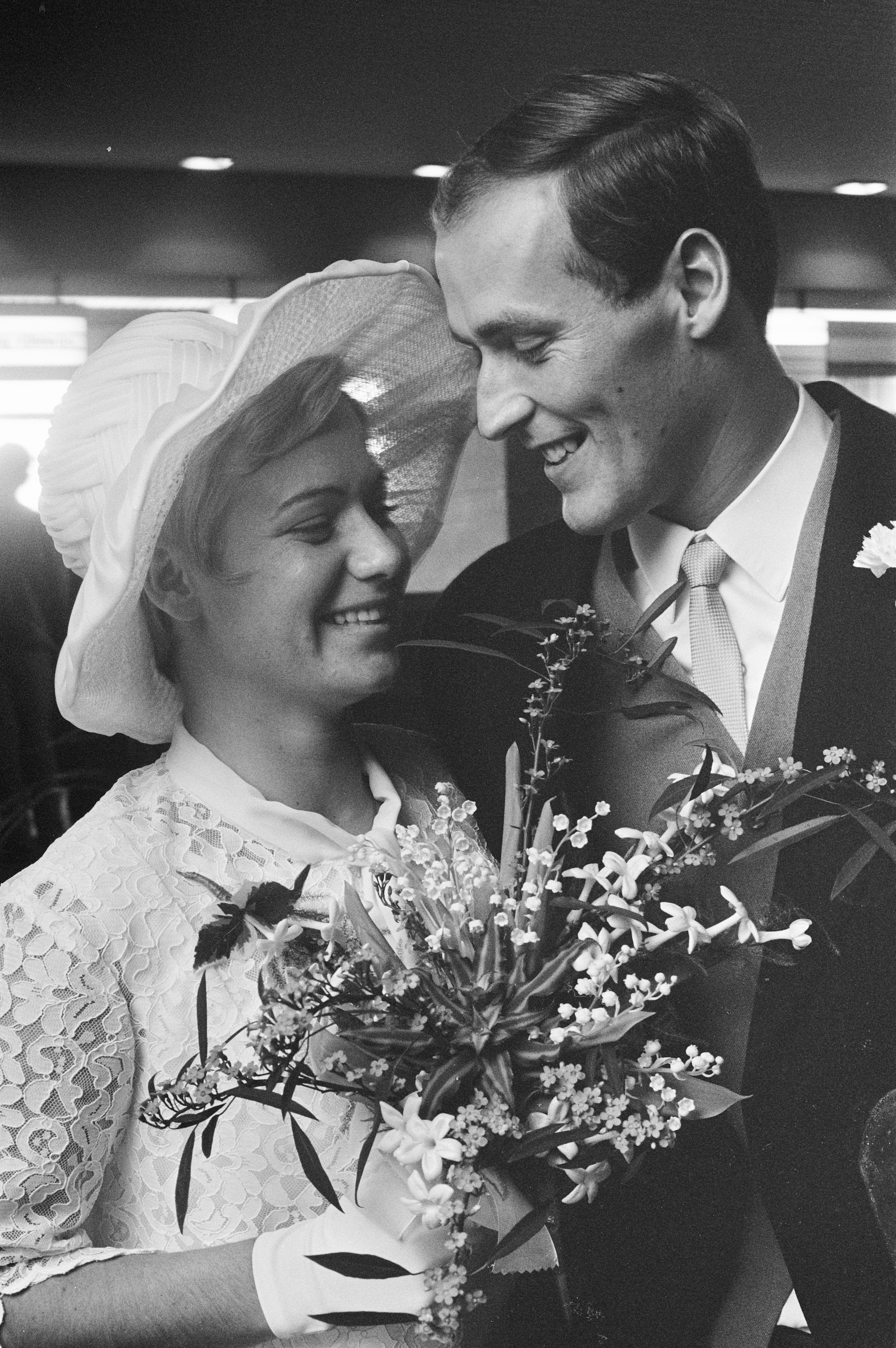
- Betty Heukels and Hans Wouda, just married on 5 November 1969

Personal information
- Born: April 7, 1941 (age 84); Amsterdam, Netherlands

Sport
- Sport: Water polo

Hans Wouda (born 7 April 1941) is a former water polo player from the Netherlands, who competed in the 1968 and 1972 Summer Olympics for his native country. In both games he finished in seventh position with the Dutch Men's Water Polo Team.

Wouda is married to the former Olympic swimmer Betty Heukels. He is not related to Dutch swimmer Marcel Wouda.
