= Luis Niño =

Mexican diver (born 1946)

Personal information
- Born: 3 August 1946 (age 79) Mexico City, Mexico

Sport
- Sport: Diving
Medal record
Men's diving
Representing Mexico
Universiade
Silver medal – second place	1967 Tokyo	Springboard
Pan American Games
Silver medal – second place	1967 Winnipeg	10m platform

Luis Niño (born 3 August 1946) is a Mexican diver. He competed at the 1964 Summer Olympics and the 1968 Summer Olympics.
