= Diving at the 1967 Summer Universiade =

The Diving competition in the 1967 Summer Universiade in Tokyo, Japan.

== Medal overview ==
Event	Gold	Silver	Bronze
Men's 3-Meter Springboard	Keith Russell (USA)	Luis Niño (MEX)	Tord Andersson (SWE)
Men's Platform	Yosuke Arimitsu (JPN)	Keith Russell (USA)	Toshio Otsubo (JPN)
Women's 3-Meter Springboard	Micki King (USA)	Lesley Bush (USA)	Ingeborg Pertmayr (AUT)
Women's Platform	Lesley Bush (USA)	Keiko Osaki (JPN)	Micki King (USA)

== Medal table ==
* Host nation (Japan)

Rank	Nation	Gold	Silver	Bronze	Total
1	United States (USA)	3	2	1	6
2	Japan (JPN)	1	1	1	3
3	Mexico (MEX)	0	1	0	1
4	Austria (AUT)	0	0	1	1
4	Sweden (SWE)	0	0	1	1
Totals (5 entries)		4	4	4	12
