= Kirsten Velin =

Danish diver

Personal information
- Nationality: Danish
- Born: 14 December 1944 (age 80) Copenhagen, Denmark

Sport
- Sport: Diving

Kirsten Velin (born 14 December 1944) is a Danish diver. She competed in the women's 10 metre platform event at the 1964 Summer Olympics.
