= Vladimir Kravchenko (swimmer) =

Soviet swimmer (1947–2024)

Personal information
- Born: 16 October 1947 Moscow, Russian SFSR, USSR
- Died: 23 July 2024 (aged 76)
- Height: 1.87 m (6 ft 2 in)
- Weight: 81 kg (179 lb)

Sport
- Sport: Swimming
- Club: Burevestnik Moscow

Vladimir Kravchenko (Russian: Владимир Кравченко; 16 October 1947 – 23 July 2024) was a Soviet swimmer. He took part in the 1968 Summer Olympics in the 200 m and 400 m individual medley events, but did not reach the finals. His future wife, Tamara Sosnova, also competed in swimming at the same Olympics.

In 1970, he set a new European record in the 200 m medley. Between 1967 and 1971 he won seven national titles and set five national records in the 200 m and 400 m individual medley events.

From 1989 he competed in the masters category, in which he held multiple European titles and records. He won a European gold medal in the 4 × 100 m medley relay in 2005, and two bronze medals at world championships in 1995–1997 in breaststroke events. Between 1990 and 2008 he won 24 national titles (USSR, CIS and then Russia) and set 11 Russian records. He died in July 2024, at the age of 76.
