= Tamara Sosnova =

Soviet swimmer (1949–2011)

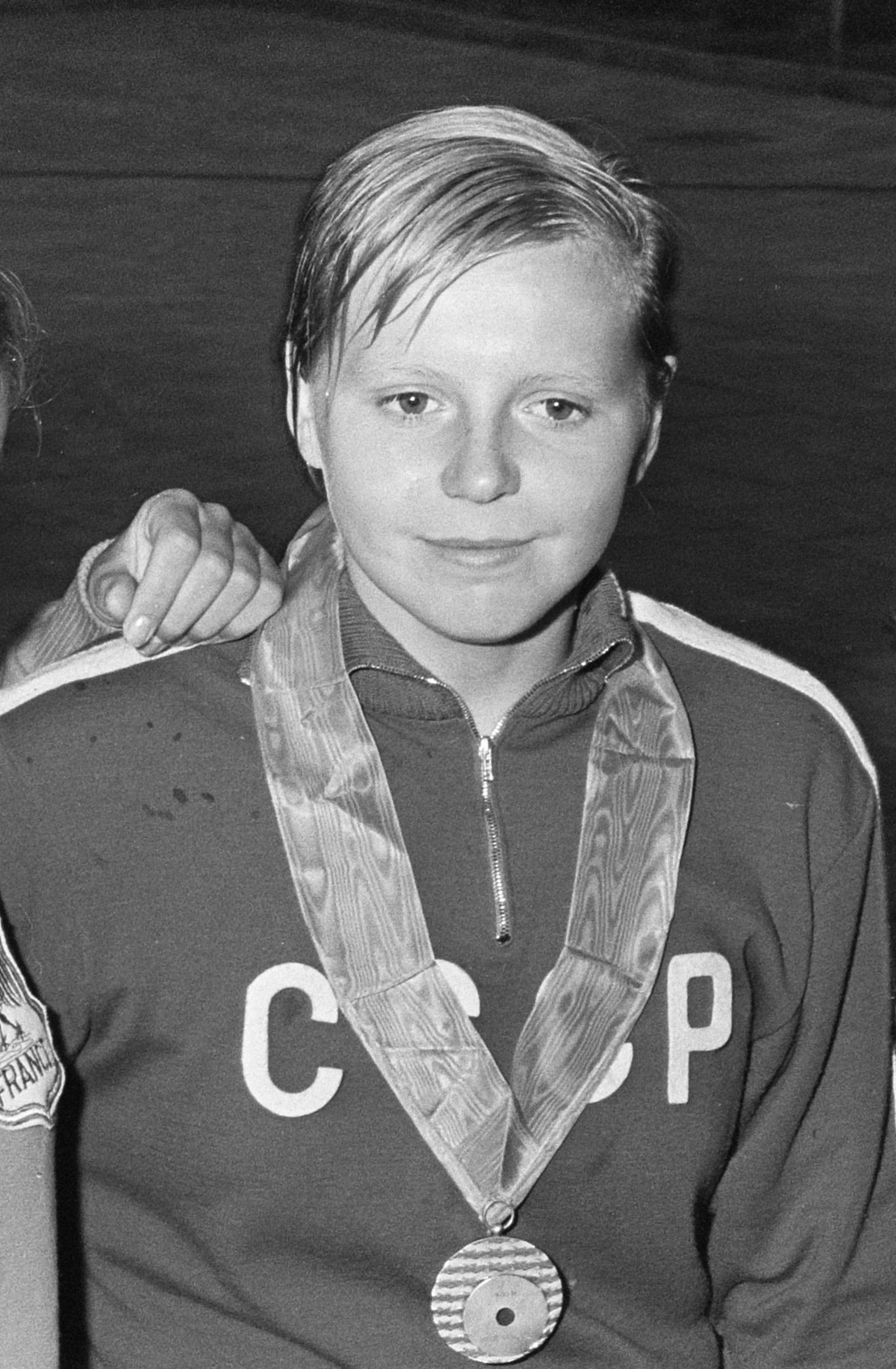
- Tamara Sosnova in 1966

Personal information
- Born: 18 December 1949 Moscow, Soviet Union
- Died: 10 August 2011 (aged 61) Moscow, Russia
- Height: 1.66 m (5 ft 5 in)
- Weight: 64 kg (141 lb)

Sport
- Sport: Swimming
- Club: Spartak Moscow
Medal record
Representing Soviet Union
European Championships
| Gold medal – first place | 1966 Utrecht | 4×100 m freestyle |
| Bronze medal – third place | 1966 Utrecht | 400 m freestyle |

Tamara Mikhaylovna Sosnova (Russian: Тамара Михайловна Соснова; 18 December 1949 – 10 August 2011) was a Soviet freestyle swimmer who won two medals at the 1966 European Aquatics Championships. She also competed in the 1968 Summer Olympics but did not reach the finals. Between 1964 and 1968 she won 10 national championships and set 21 national records in 100 m (1), 200 m (4), 400 m (8), 800 m (3), 1500 m (1) and freestyle relays (4).

She was the younger sister of Galina Sosnova. After marriage, she changed her last name to Kravchenko (Russian: Кравченко). Her husband, Vladimir Kravchenko, also competed in swimming at the 1968 Summer Olympics. After retiring from swimming she taught at the Russian State Agricultural University.
