= Nataliya Sipchenko =

Russian swimmer (born 1947)

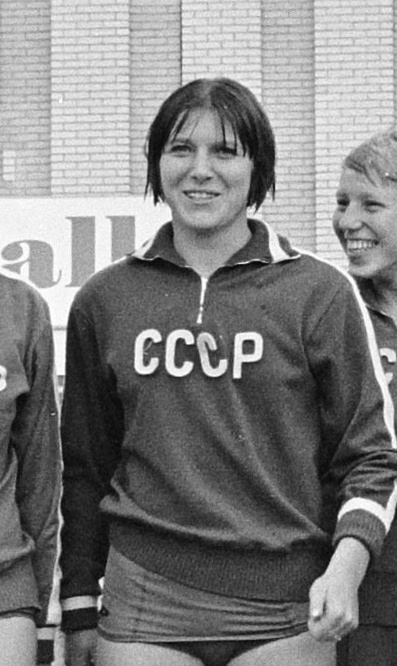
- Natalya Sipchenko in 1966

Personal information
- Born: 1947 (age 78–79) Leningrad, USSR

Sport
- Sport: Swimming
- Club: Dynamo
Medal record
Representing Soviet Union
European Championships
| Gold medal – first place | 1966 Utrecht | 4×100 m freestyle |

Natalya Viktorovna Sipchenko (Russian: Наталия Викторовна Сипченко; born 1947) is a retired Russian swimmer who won a gold medal in the 4×100 m freestyle relay at the 1966 European Aquatics Championships, setting a new European record. She won a national title in the same event in 1965.
