= Lydia Schaap =

Dutch swimmer

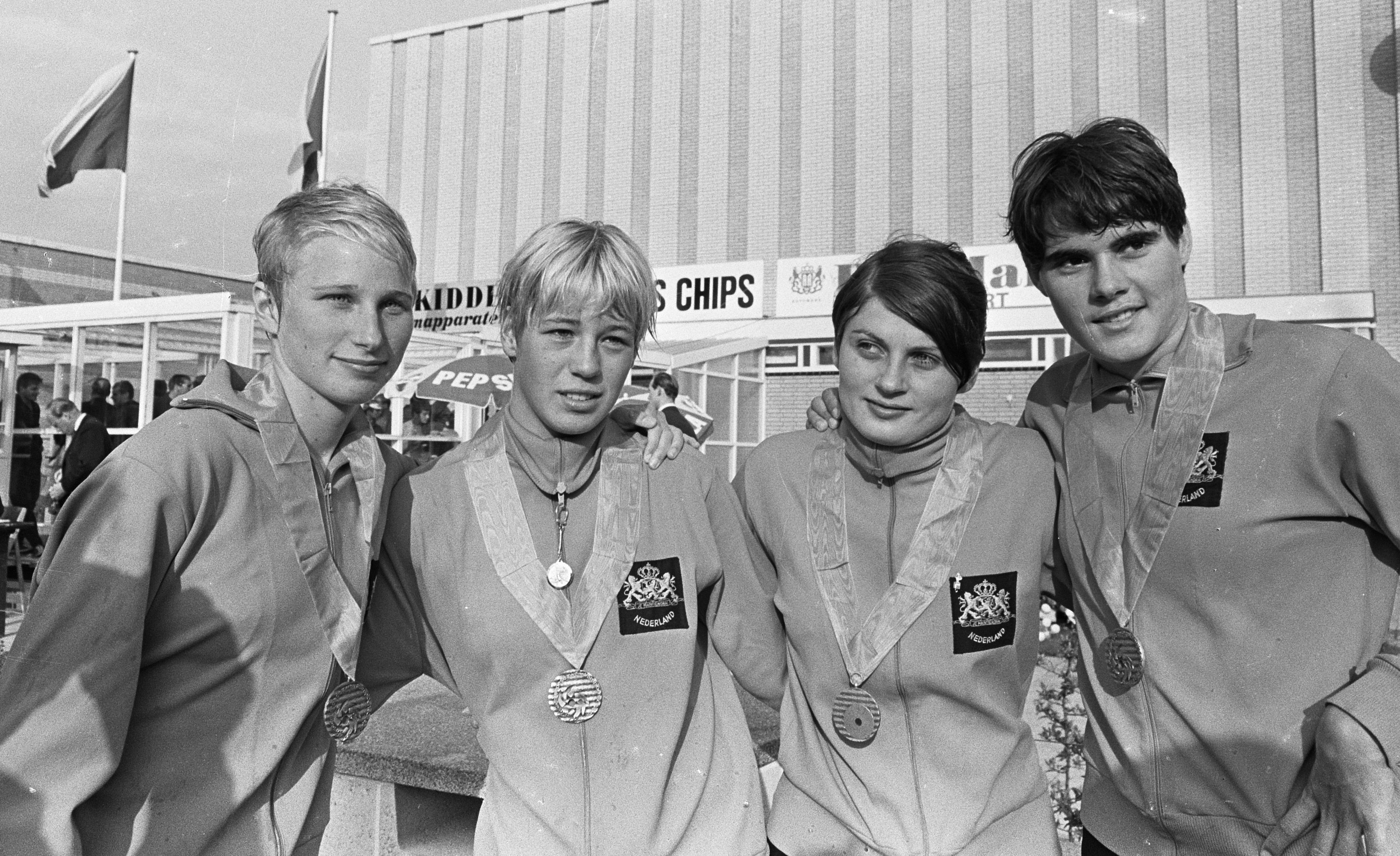
- Dutch 1966 relay team, Schaap is 2nd from right

Sport
- Sport: Swimming
Medal record
Representing the Netherlands
European Championships
Bronze medal – third place	1966 Utrecht	4×100 m freestyle

Lydia Schaap is a retired Dutch freestyle swimmer who won a bronze medal in the 4 × 100 m freestyle relay at the 1966 European Championships.
