= 1966 European Aquatics Championships =

Water sport competitions

11th European Aquatics Championships
- Host city: Utrecht
- Country: Netherlands
- Events: 23
- Opening: 20 August 1966
- Closing: 27 August 1966

The 1966 European Aquatics Championships were held in Utrecht, Netherlands from 20 to 27 August 1966. Titles were contested in swimming, diving and water polo (men).

== Medal table ==
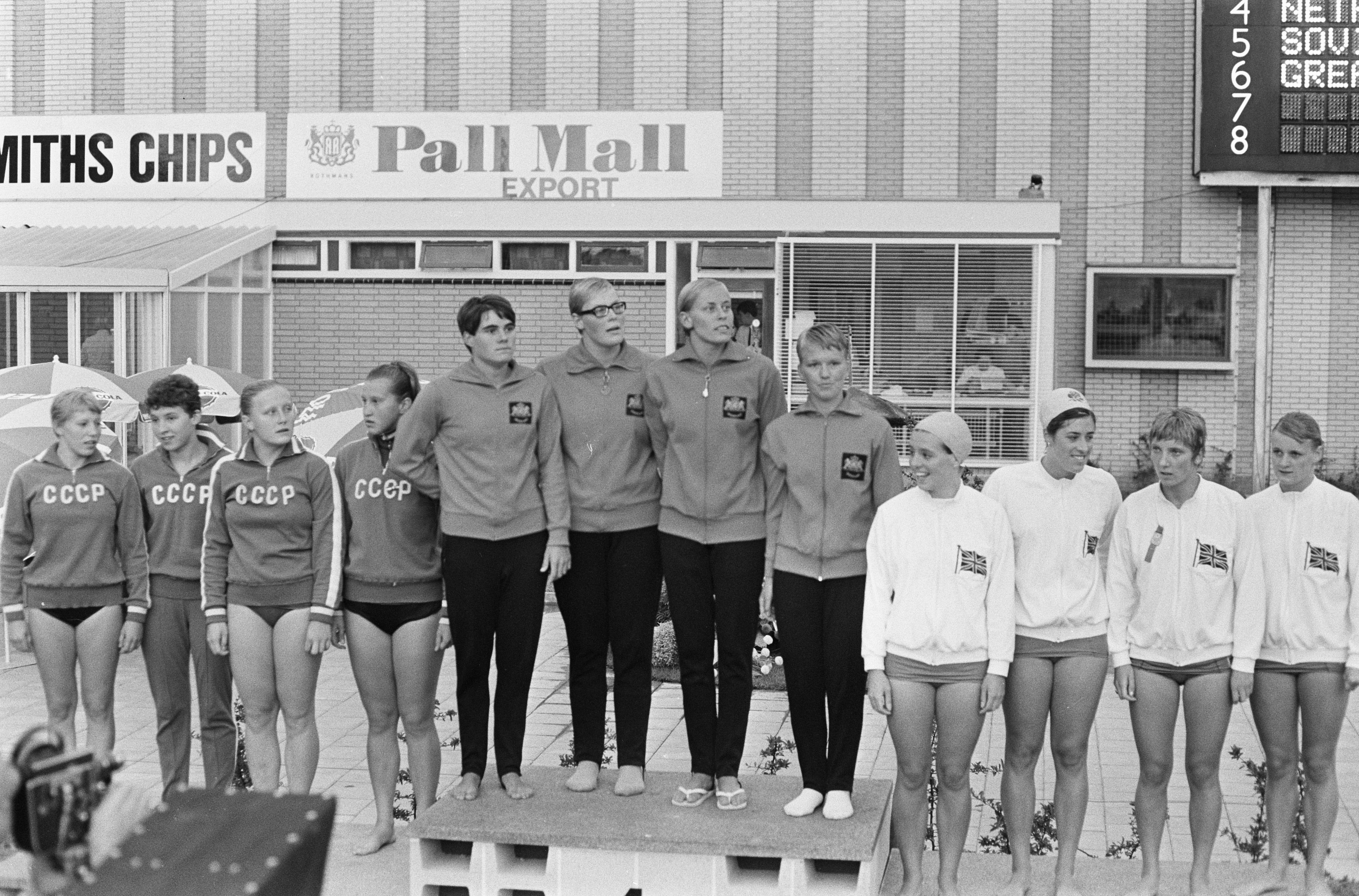
4 × 100 m medley relay women podium. From left to right: Soviet Union, Netherlands and Great Britain

* Host nation (Netherlands)

Rank	Nation	Gold	Silver	Bronze	Total
1	Soviet Union	12	7	5	24
2	East Germany	4	6	5	15
3	Netherlands*	3	1	1	5
4	France	2	0	1	3
5	Great Britain	1	3	3	7
6	Italy	1	0	1	2
7	Sweden	0	2	2	4
8	Hungary	0	1	1	2
9	Austria	0	1	0	1
9	Spain	0	1	0	1
9	West Germany	0	1	0	1
12	Finland	0	0	1	1
12	Poland	0	0	1	1
12	Romania	0	0	1	1
12	Yugoslavia	0	0	1	1
Totals (15 entries)		23	23	23	69

== Medal summary ==
=== Diving ===
Men's events

Event	Gold		Silver		Bronze	
3 m springboard	Mikhail Safonov (URS)	155.27	Tord Andersson (SWE)	146.30	Franco Cagnotto (ITA)	146.21
10 m platform	Klaus Dibiasi (ITA)	162.92	Brian Phelps (GBR)	152.01	Jerzy Kowalewski (POL)	143.13

Women's events

Event	Gold		Silver		Bronze	
3 m springboard	Vera Baklanova (URS)	136.59	Delia Reinhard (GDR)	136.05	Tamara Fyedosova (URS)	133.23
10 m platform	Natalya Kuznetsova (URS)	100.93	Ingeborg Pertmayr (AUT)	94.52	Gabriele Krauss Schöpe (GDR)	91.22

=== Swimming ===
==== Men's events ====
Event	Gold		Silver		Bronze	
100 m freestyle	Bobby McGregor (GBR)	53.7	Leonid Ilyichev (URS)	54.3	Udo Poser (GDR)	54.8
400 m freestyle	Frank Wiegand (GDR)	4:11.1 WR	Semyon Belits-Geiman (URS)	4:13.2	Alain Mosconi (FRA)	4:13.6
1500 m freestyle	Semyon Belits-Geiman (URS)	16:58.5	Alan Kimber (GBR)	17:13.2	Aleksandr Pletnyev (URS)	17:17.9
200 m backstroke	Yuriy Gromak (URS)	2:12.9	Jaime Monzó (ESP)	2:15.7	Joachim Rother (GDR)	2:16.7
200 m breaststroke	Georgiy Prokopenko (URS)	2:30.0	Aleksandr Tutakayev (URS)	2:30.3	Egon Henninger (GDR)	2:30.5
200 m butterfly	Valentin Kuzmin (URS)	2:10.2	Horst-Günter Gregor (GDR)	2:10.6	Anatoliy Skavronskiy (URS)	2:11.2
400 m individual medley	Frank Wiegand (GDR)	4:47.9	Andrey Dunayev (URS)	4:48.7	Klaus Katzur (GDR)	4:55.7
4 × 100 m freestyle relay	East Germany; Frank Wiegand; Udo Poser; Horst-Günter Gregor; Peter Sommer	3:36.8	Soviet Union; Leonid Ilyichev; Viktor Mazanov; Georgiy Kulikov; Vladimir Shuvalov	3:37.5	Sweden; Lester Eriksson; Göran Jansson; Yngvar Eriksson; Jan Lundin	3:39.0
4 × 200 m freestyle relay	Soviet Union; Leonid Ilyichev; Semyon Belits-Geiman; Aleksandr Pletnev; Yevgeniy Novikov	8:00.2	East Germany; Horst-Günter Gregor; Alfred Müller; Udo Poser; Frank Wiegand	8:01.6	Sweden; Lester Eriksson; Olle Ferm; Ingvar Eriksson; Jan Lundin	8:04.3
4 × 100 m medley relay	Soviet Union; Viktor Mazanov; Georgiy Prokopenko; Valentin Kuzmin; Leonid Ilyichev	4:02.4	East Germany; Jürgen Dietze; Egon Henninger; Horst-Günter Gregor; Frank Wiegand	4:02.9	HUN; József Csikány; Ferenc Lenkei; Ákos Gulyás; István Szentirmay	4:05.9

==== Women's events ====
Event	Gold		Silver		Bronze	
100 m freestyle	Martina Grunert (GDR)	1:01.2	Judit Turóczy (HUN)	1:02.1	Pauline Sillett (GBR)	1:02.5
400 m freestyle	Claude Mandonnaud (FRA)	4:48.2	Ada Kok (NED)	4:48.7	Tamara Sosnova (URS)	4:50.1
100 m backstroke	Christine Caron (FRA)	1:08.1	Linda Ludgrove (GBR)	1:08.9	Cristina Balaban (ROM)	1:09.7
200 m breaststroke	Galina Prozumenshchikova (URS)	2:40.8	Irina Pozdnyakova (URS)	2:41.9	Jill Slattery (GBR)	2:47.9
100 m butterfly	Ada Kok (NED)	1:05.6	Heike Hustede (FRG)	1:06.3	Eila Pyrhönen (FIN)	1:07.8
400 m individual medley	Betty Heukels (NED)	5:25.0	Heidi Pechstein (GDR)	5:26.0	Lyudmila Khazieva (URS)	5:28.4
4 × 100 m freestyle relay	Soviet Union; Natalya Sipchenko; Antonina Rudenko; Natalya Ustinova; Tamara Sosnova	4:11.3	Sweden; Ingrid Gustavsson; Ulla Jafvert; Ann-charlott Lilja; Anne-Christine Hagberg	4:12.2	Netherlands; Toos Beumer; Mirjam van Hemert; Bep Weeteling; Lydia Schaap	4:12.8
4 × 100 m medley relay	Netherlands; Cobie Sikkens; Gretta Kok; Ada Kok; Toos Beumer	4:36.4	Soviet Union; Natalya Mikhaylova; Galina Prozumenshchikova; Tatyana Devyatova; Antonina Rudenko	4:38.2	Great Britain; Linda Ludgrove; Diana Harris; Mary-Anne Cotterill; Pauline Sillett	4:38.4

=== Water polo ===
Event	Gold	Silver	Bronze
Men's competition	Soviet Union	East Germany	Yugoslavia

== See also ==
- List of European Championships records in swimming
