= Ingeborg Busch =

German diver

Personal information
- Nationality: German
- Born: 26 December 1943 (age 81); Heidelberg, Germany

Sport
- Sport: Diving

Ingeborg Busch (born 26 December 1943) is a German diver. She competed in the women's 10 metre platform event at the 1968 Summer Olympics.
