= Tord Andersson =

Swedish diver (1942–2024)

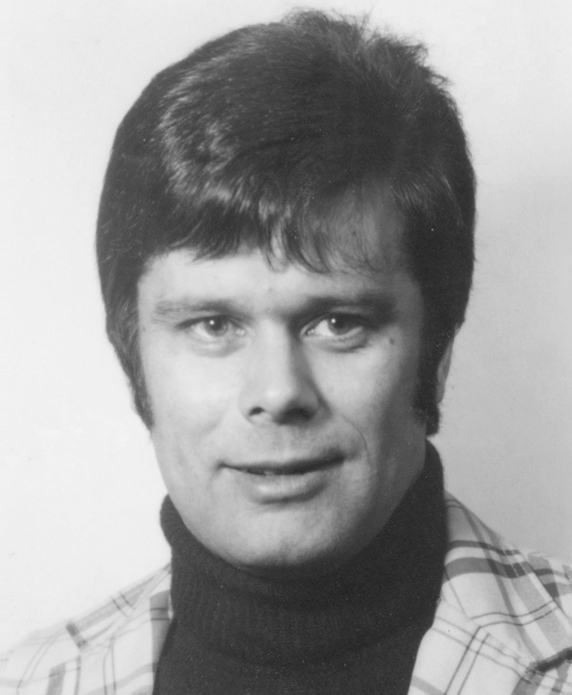
- Andersson in 1968

Personal information
- Born: 11 March 1942 Malmö, Sweden
- Died: 23 September 2024 (aged 82)
- Height: 183 cm (6 ft 0 in)
- Weight: 70 kg (154 lb)

Sport
- Sport: Diving
- Club: Malmö SS
Medal record
Representing Sweden
European Championships
Silver medal – second place	1966 Utrecht	3 m springboard
Universiade
Bronze medal – third place	1967 Tokyo	3 m springboard

Tord Göran Andersson (11 March 1942 – 23 September 2024) was a Swedish diver who won a silver medal in the 3m springboard at the 1966 European Championships. Two years later he competed in the springboard and in the platform at the 1968 Olympics and finished seventh and eleventh, respectively.
