= Natalya Mikhaylova =

Soviet swimmer

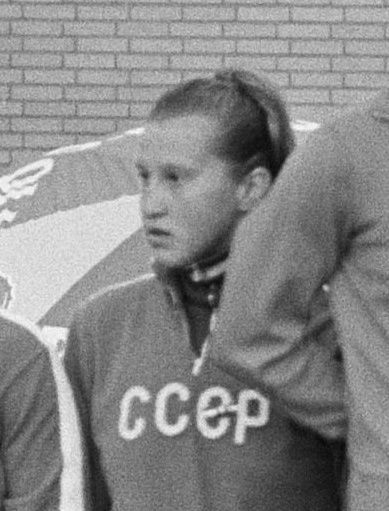
- Natalya Mikhaylova in 1966

Personal information
- Born: 19 May 1948 (age 78) Moscow, Soviet Union
- Height: 1.71 m (5 ft 7 in)
- Weight: 71 kg (157 lb)

Sport
- Sport: Swimming
- Club: CSKA Moscow
Medal record
European Championships
Silver medal – second place	1966 Utrecht	4×100 m medley

Natalya Vasilievna Mikhaylova (Russian: Наталья Васильевна Михайлова; born 19 May 1948) is a Soviet swimmer who won a silver medal in the 4 × 100 m medley relay at the 1966 European Aquatics Championships; she finished fourth in the individual 100 m backstroke competition. She also took part in the 1964 Summer Olympics in two events, but did not reach the finals. During her career she won six national titles and set 21 national records in various backstroke, freestyle and medley events.

Since the introduction of masters tournaments in the Soviet Union in 1989 she competes in this category. She won one gold, five silver and six bronze medals at European championships, as well as two silver and four bronze medals at world championships. Nationally, she won 82 titles and set more than 150 records between 1989 and 2010.
