= Jeong Sun-ja =

South Korean diver (born 1947)

Personal information
- Nationality: South Korean
- Born: 8 August 1947 (age 77)

Sport
- Sport: Diving

Jeong Sun-ja (born 8 August 1947) is a South Korean diver. She competed in the women's 10 metre platform event at the 1964 Summer Olympics.
