= Diving at the 1967 Pan American Games =

This page shows the results of the Diving Competition for men and women at the 1967 Pan American Games, held from July 23 to August 6, 1967, in Winnipeg, Manitoba, Canada. There were two events, for both men and women.

== Medal table ==
Place	Nation	Gold medal	Silver medal	Bronze medal	Total
1	United States	4	2	1	7
2	Canada	0	1	1	2
2	Mexico	0	1	0	1
4	Colombia	0	0	2	2
Total		4	4	4	12

== Medalists ==
=== Men ===
Event	Gold	Silver	Bronze
3m springboard	Bernie Wrightson; United States	Keith Russell; United States	Raul Escobar; Colombia
10m platform	Edwin Young; United States	Luis de Rivera; Mexico	Diego Henao; Colombia

=== Women ===
Event	Gold	Silver	Bronze
3m springboard	Sue Gossick; United States	Micki King; United States	Kathy McDonald; Canada
10m platform	Lesley Bush; United States	Beverly Boys; Canada	Ann Peterson; United States

== See also ==
- Diving at the 1968 Summer Olympics
