= Tatyana Karakashyants =

Soviet diver

Personal information
- Born: December 21, 1925 Kursk, Soviet Union
- Died: October 13, 2004 (aged 78) Moscow, Russia

Sport
- Sport: Diving
Medal record
Representing the Soviet Union
European Championships
Gold medal – first place	1954 Turin	10 m platform

Tatyana Maximovna Karakashyants (née Vereina, later Karakashyants and Petrukhina; Russian: Татьяна Максимовна Каракашьянц, December 21, 1925 – October 13, 2004) was a Soviet diver and diving coach. She competed in the 10 m platform at the 1952 and 1956 Summer Olympics and finished in sixth and fifth place, respectively. She won this event at the 1954 European Aquatics Championships.

After retiring from competitive diving, she worked as a diving coach in sports society Spartak. She was an Honored Coach of the Soviet Union. Among her students were Vladimir Vasin, Nataliya Lobanova and Yelena Miroshina.

She died at the age of 78 in Moscow and was buried at the Nikolo-Arkhangelskoe Cemetery.
