= Ákos Gulyás =

Hungarian swimmer (born 1942)

Personal information
- Born: 14 August 1942 (age 83) Debrecen, Hungary
- Height: 1.89 m (6 ft 2 in)
- Weight: 79 kg (174 lb)

Sport
- Sport: Swimming
- Club: OSC, Budapest
Medal record
Representing Hungary
European Championships
Bronze medal – third place	1966 Utrecht	4×100 m medley

Ákos Gulyás (born 14 August 1942) is a retired Hungarian swimmer who won a bronze medal in the 4 × 100 m medley relay at the 1966 European Aquatics Championships. He competed in the 4 × 100 m freestyle relay and 200 m backstroke at the 1964 Summer Olympics, but did not reach the finals.
