= Dora Hernández =

Mexican diver

Personal information
- Born: 15 July 1948 (age 77) Mexico City, Mexico

Sport
- Sport: Diving
Medal record
Representing Mexico
Central American and Caribbean Games
Silver medal – second place	1966 San Juan	3m springboard
Silver medal – second place	1966 San Juan	10m platform

Dora Hernández (born 15 July 1948) is a Mexican diver. She competed in the women's 10 metre platform event at the 1968 Summer Olympics.
