= Bernard Wrightson =

American diver (born 1944)

Personal information
- Born: June 25, 1944 (age 82)
Medal record
Men's diving
Representing the United States
Olympic Games
Gold medal – first place	1968 Mexico City	3 metre springboard
Pan American Games
Gold medal – first place	1967 Winnipeg	3 metre springboard
Universiade
Silver medal – second place	1965 Budapest	3 m springboard
Silver medal – second place	1965 Budapest	Platform

Bernard Charles Wrightson (born June 25, 1944) is a former Olympic and Pan American Games gold medalist for the United States. The Denver, Colorado, native was primarily a three-meter springboard diver, but he also won a national AAU championship on the ten-meter platform. Between 1964 and 1968, Bernie Wrightson captured a total of eight USA Open titles in the sport of diving. He represented US at the 1968 Summer Olympics in Mexico City, where he received a gold medal in Springboard Diving.

== Biography ==
Wrightson was raised in Denver, Colorado, where he attended Denver East High School. He attended Arizona State University; in 1966 he was the National Collegiate Athletic Association champion on both the one and three-meter springboard. The following season, Wrightson won a gold medal at the Pan-American Games in Winnipeg. He set an Olympic record of 170 points to win the gold medal at the 1968 Games in Mexico City.

== Awards ==
He was inducted into the International Swimming Hall of Fame in Fort Lauderdale, Florida, in 1984.

== See also ==
- List of members of the International Swimming Hall of Fame
