= Toshio Otsubo =

Japanese diver

Personal information
- Nationality: Japanese
- Born: 26 February 1943 (age 83) Tottori Prefecture, Japan

Sport
- Sport: Diving
Medal record
Men's diving
Representing Japan
Summer Universiade
Bronze medal – third place	1967 Tokyo	Platform
Asian Games
Silver medal – second place	1970 Bangkok	Platform

Toshio Otsubo (大坪敏郎, Ōtsubo Toshio; born 26 February 1943) is a Japanese diver. He competed at the 1964 Summer Olympics and the 1968 Summer Olympics.
