= Yosuke Arimitsu =

Japanese diver (born 1943)

Personal information
- Full name: Yosuke Arimitsu
- Born: November 16, 1943 (age 82) Japan
Medal record
Men's diving
Representing Japan
Summer Universiade
Gold medal – first place	1967 Tokyo	10m platform
Asian Games
Gold medal – first place	1966 Bangkok	10m platform

Yosuke Arimitsu (有光 洋右, Arimitsu Yōsuke; born 16 November 1943) is a Japanese former diver who competed in the 1964 Summer Olympics and in the 1968 Summer Olympics.
