= Aleksandr Pletnev =

Russian swimmer (born 1948)

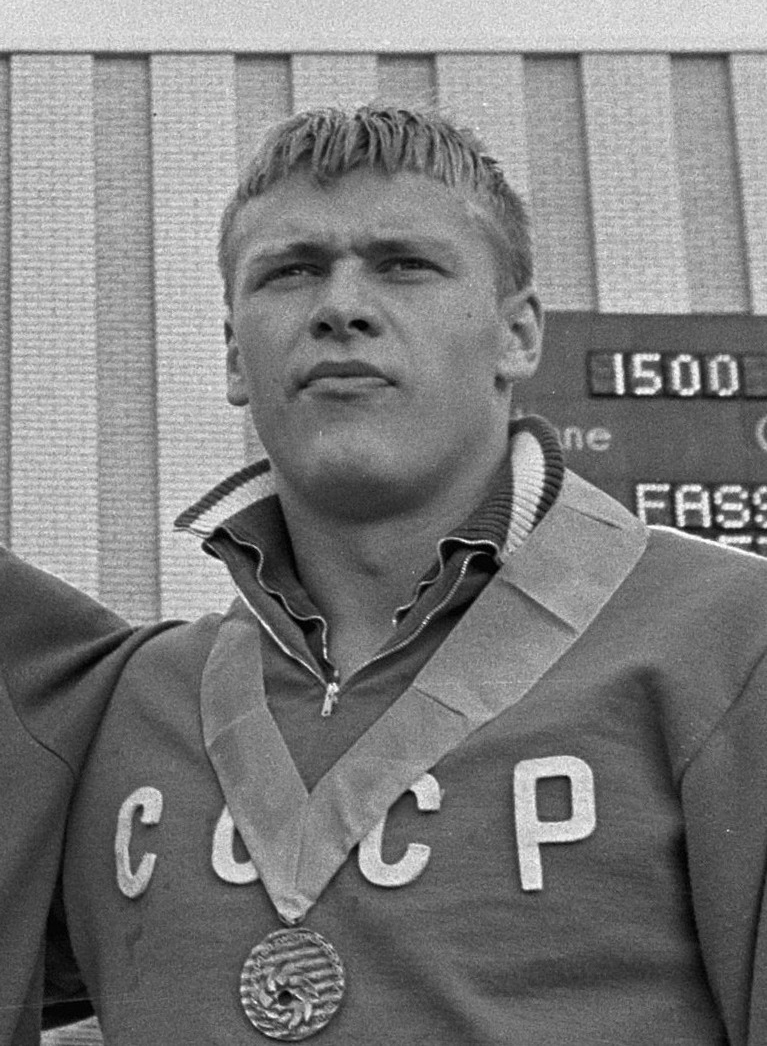
- Aleksandr Pletnyev in 1966

Personal information
- Born: 1948 (age 77–78) Moscow, Russia

Sport
- Sport: Swimming
- Club: Spartak
Medal record
Representing Soviet Union
European Championships
Gold medal – first place	1966 Utrecht	4×200 m freestyle
Bronze medal – third place	1966 Utrecht	1500 m freestyle

Aleksandr Pletnev (Russian: Александр Плетнев; born 1948) is a retired Russian swimmer who won a gold medal in the 4×200 m freestyle relay at the 1966 European Aquatics Championships, setting a new European record; individually, he won a bronze medal in the 1500 m freestyle event. He also won three national titles in the 400 m (1966) and 1500 m (1965, 1966) freestyle.
