= Claudia Reiche =

German diver

Personal information
- Nationality: German
- Born: 13 May 1951 (age 73); Dresden, Germany

Sport
- Sport: Diving

Claudia Reiche (born 13 May 1951) is a German diver. She competed in the women's 10 metre platform event at the 1968 Summer Olympics.
