= Henriette Parzer =

Austrian gymnast (born 1943)

Personal information
- Nationality: Austrian
- Born: 28 August 1943 (age 81); Vienna, Austria

Sport
- Sport: Gymnastics

Henriette Parzer (born 28 August 1943) is an Austrian gymnast. She competed at the 1960 Summer Olympics and the 1964 Summer Olympics.
