= Artur Karpukhin =

Russian footballer

Personal information
- Full name: Artur Sergeyevich Karpukhin
- Date of birth: 15 July 1995 (age 31)
- Place of birth: Angarsk, Russia
- Height: 1.69 m (5 ft 6 1/2 in)
- Position: Midfielder

Senior career*
Years	Team	Apps	(Gls)
2011–2012	FC Chita-M Chita		
2012–2013	FC Chita	0	(0)
2014–2015	FC Chita	0	(0)
2016	FC Baikal Irkutsk	14	(1)
- * Club domestic league appearances and goals

Artur Sergeyevich Karpukhin (Russian: Артур Сергеевич Карпухин; born 15 July 1995) is a Russian former football player.

== Career ==
He made his debut in the Russian Football National League for FC Baikal Irkutsk on 12 March 2016 in a game against FC Yenisey Krasnoyarsk.
