= Viktor Karpukhin =

Viktor Karpukhin may refer to:

- Viktor Karpukhin (Soviet Major general) (1947–2003), Soviet intelligence officer
- Viktor Karpukhin (footballer) (b. 1989), Russian footballer
