= Rachel Kealaonapua O'Sullivan =

American diver

Keala O'Sullivan
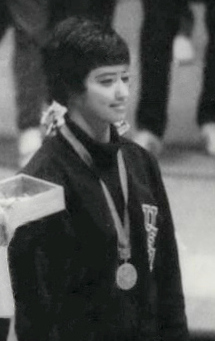
- O'Sullivan at the 1968 Olympics

Personal information
- Full name: Rachel Kealaonapua O'Sullivan
- Born: November 3, 1950 (age 75) Honolulu, Hawaii, U.S.
- Height: 165 cm (5 ft 5 in)
- Weight: 57 kg (126 lb)

Sport
- Sport: Diving
- Club: Punahou Swim Club
Medal record
Representing the United States
Olympic Games
Bronze medal – third place	1968 Mexico City	3 m springboard

Rachel Kealaonapua "Keala" O'Sullivan (later Watson; born November 3, 1950) is an American former diver. In 1965, she won the U.S. Junior AAU one-meter board diving championships. She represented the United States at the 1968 Olympics, where she earned a bronze medal in three-meter springboard; this made her the first Hawaiian athlete to medal in diving. She is of European, Native Hawaiian and Tahitian descent.

O'Sullivan retired after failing to qualify for the 1972 Olympics. She then returned to Hawaii, where she coached divers at ʻIolani School. In 1999, she was inducted into the Hawaii Sports Hall of Fame.
