= Nadezhda Karpukhina =

Soviet diver

Personal information
- Nationality: Soviet
- Born: 21 July 1949 (age 76) Baku, Soviet Union

Sport
- Sport: Diving

Nadezhda Karpukhina (born 21 July 1949) is an Azerbaijani former diver who competed for the Soviet Union. She competed in the women's 10 metre platform event at the 1968 Summer Olympics, placing 22nd.

At the time of the 1968 Soviet diving championships, the team for the 1968 Olympics had already been decided. However, Karpukhina won the championship with a result so impressive that the team officials immediately held a meeting and decided she would also be a member of the Olympic team, at age 18.
