= Vera Baklanova =

Soviet diver (born 1947)

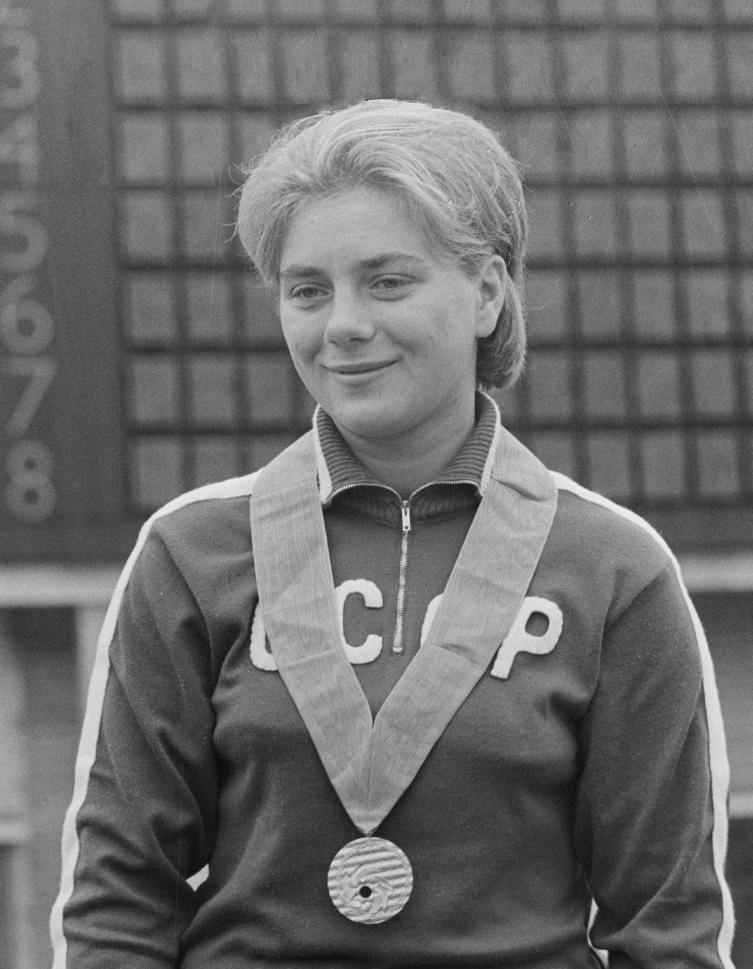
- Vera Baklanova in 1966

Personal information
- Born: 25 June 1947 (age 79) Moscow, Russia
- Height: 1.60 m (5 ft 3 in)
- Weight: 57 kg (126 lb)

Sport
- Sport: Diving
- Club: Spartak
Medal record
Representing Soviet Union
European Championships
| Gold medal – first place | 1966 Utrecht | Springboard |

Vera Vasilyevna Baklanova (Russian: Вера Васильевна Бакланова; born 25 June 1947) is a former Soviet diver who won a gold medal in the 3 m springboard at the 1966 European Aquatics Championships. She competed in the same event at the 1964 and 1968 Summer Olympics and finished in 12th and 6th position, respectively.
