= Park Jeong-ja =

South Korean diver

Park Jung-ja, 朴貞子, 新井貞子
Personal information
- Nationality: South Korean
- Born: 11 February 1949 (age 76); Kobe, Japan

Sport
- Sport: Diving

Park Jung-ja (born 11 February 1949) is a South Korean diver. She is a second-generation Korean resident in Japan. She competed in two events at the 1968 Summer Olympics.
