= Mariët Dommers =

Dutch diver (born 1948)

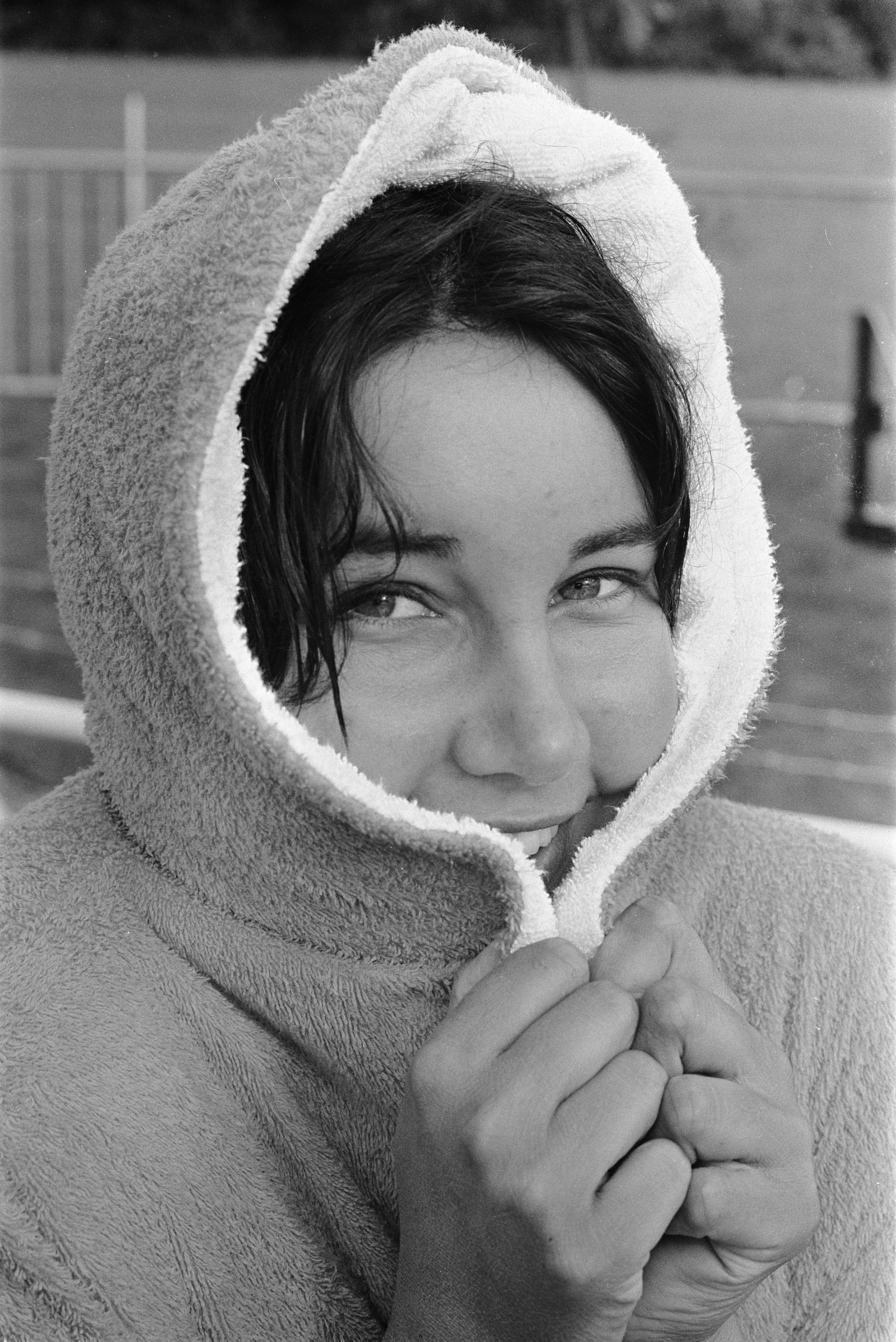
- Mariët Dommers in 1968

Personal information
- Born: 19 March 1948 (age 78) Manado, Indonesia
- Height: 1.68 m (5 ft 6 in)
- Weight: 68 kg (150 lb)

Sport
- Sport: Diving
- Club: Joop Stotijn, Den Haag

Mariëtte Jacoba Geertruida "Mariët" Dommers (born 19 March 1948) is a former diver from the Netherlands. She competed at the 1968 and 1972 Summer Olympics in springboard and finished in 18th and 23rd position, respectively.

After marriage in 1973 she changed her last name to 'Van der Want'.
