= Tamara Safonova =

Russian diver

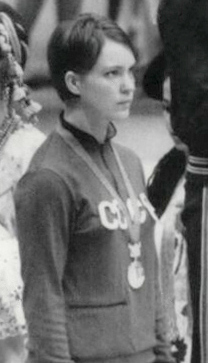
- Safonova in 1968

Personal information
- Born: 24 June 1946 (age 80) Moscow, Russian SFSR, Soviet Union
- Height: 1.62 m (5 ft 4 in)
- Weight: 56 kg (123 lb)

Sport
- Sport: Diving
- Club: Dynamo Moscow
Medal record
Representing the Soviet Union
Olympic Games
Silver medal – second place	1968 Mexico City	Springboard
European Championships
Bronze medal – third place	1966 Utrecht	Springboard
Bronze medal – third place	1970 Barcelona	Springboard
Bronze medal – third place	1974 Vienna	Springboard
Summer Universiade
Gold medal – first place	1973 Moscow	Springboard

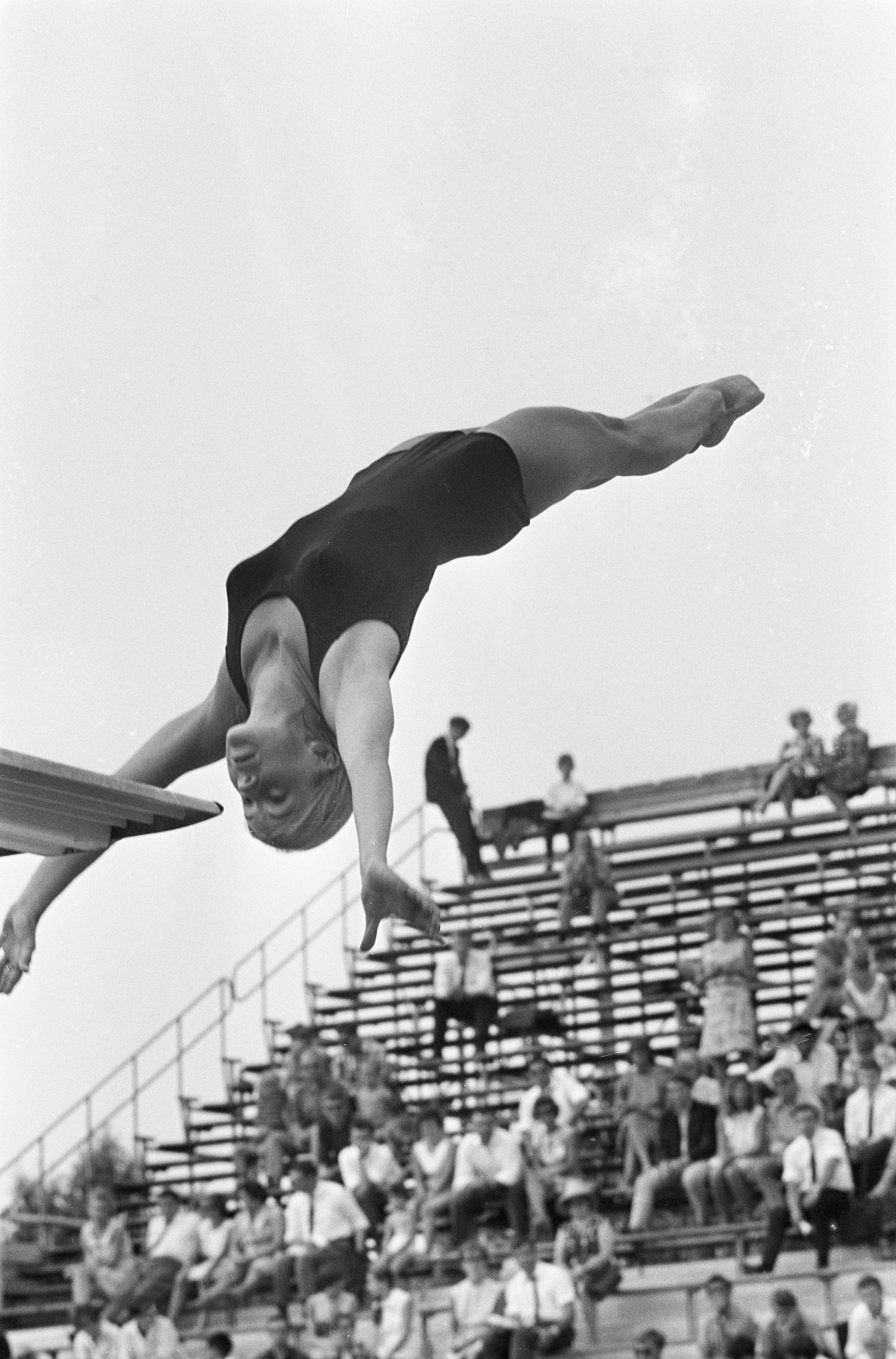
Safonova at the 1966 European Championships.

Tamara Stepanovna Safonova (née Fedosova; later Pogozheva and Safonova; Russian: Тамара Степановна Федосова-Погожева-Сафонова; born 24 June 1946) is a retired Russian diver. She competed in the 3-metre springboard at the 1964, 1968 and 1972 Summer Olympics and finished in fifth, second and seventeenth place, respectively.

She won bronze medals in the springboard at three consecutive European championships: in 1966, 1970 and 1974. She was a Soviet champion in this event in 1964, 1966–1968 and 1970–1974.

Her husband, Mikhail Safonov, is a Russian diver who competed at the 1964 and 1968 Olympics.
