= Lesley Bush =

American diver

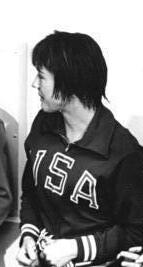
- Lesley Bush in 1964

Personal information
- Full name: Lesley Leigh Bush
- Born: September 17, 1947 (age 79) Orange, New Jersey
- Occupation: Teacher
- Height: 163 cm (5 ft 4 in)
- Weight: 52 kg (115 lb)
- Spouses: Charles Hickcox m. 1968; David Makepeace

Sport
- Sport: Diving
- Events: Springboard, Platform
- College team: Indiana University
- Club: Dick Smith Swim Gym
- Coached by: Dick Smith (Smith Swim Gym); Hobie Billingsley (Indiana)
Medal record
Women's diving
Representing the United States
Olympic Games
Gold medal – first place	1964 Tokyo	Platform
Pan American Games
Gold medal – first place	1967 Winnipeg	Platform
Summer Universiade
Gold medal – first place	1967 Tokyo	Platform
Silver medal – second place	1967 Tokyo	Springboard
Silver medal – second place	1965 Budapest	Springboard

Lesley Leigh Bush (born September 17, 1947) is an American diver and 1964 Olympic champion in the 10-meter platform who competed for Indiana University.

Bush was born in Orange, New Jersey, on September 17, 1947. After a move, by the age of 12, she trained and competed with Hall of Fame Coach Dick Smith at the Dick Smith Swim Gym in Phoenix, Arizona. At the age of 13 in June 1961, she won the Arizona State age group championships in both the 1 and 3-meter diving events.

== High school era diving ==
Around sixteen, in 1964, Bush moved to Princeton, New Jersey, and attended Princeton High School, which lacked diving facilities, so she did much of her training at YMCAs in Princeton, also representing the Summit YMCA in Summit, New Jersey. She graduated Princeton High School around the Spring of 1965. Already having moved to Princeton, New Jersey, Bush placed ninth on the 10-meter platform at the August 1963, Senior Women's National AAU Swimming and Diving Championship. Remaining nationally rated after her 1964 gold medal in Platform diving, at the National AAU Swimming and Diving Championships in Toledo, Ohio, in August 1965, she won the platform competition, clinching the event with a triple twist 1 1/2 somersault in her final dive. In 1965, Bush was rated first in the nation in Platform diving in the All-America team.

== Indiana University ==
Bush attended and swam for Indiana University where she was managed by Hall of Fame Coach Hobie Billingsley. During her collegiate diving career she won five AAU National Championships. These included outdoor championships in the platform in 1965 and 1967, an indoor championship in the one-meter springboard in 1967, and both three-meter springboard and platform championships in 1968.

== 1964 Tokyo Olympics ==
Bush tried out for the 1964 Olympic trials after training with Indiana University Coach Hobie Billingsley on the 10-meter platform for only five weeks during a summer break after her High School Junior year. By the time of the 1964 trials, Bush had already moved to Princeton, New Jersey, and was representing the Princeton YMCA. She had limited prior training in Platform. On September 4, she placed fourth, nearly qualifying in 3-meter springboard diving but a few days later made the team in platform diving placing third behind Californian Linda Cooper who took first, and Barbara Talmadge of Phoenix, Arizona who took second. Her third place finish in trials on the 10-meter platform made most consider her an unlikely candidate for an Olympic medal in the event.

At only 16, Bush represented the US at the 1964 Summer Olympics in Tokyo, where despite her youth and lack of international experience, she received a gold medal in Platform Diving. Prior to the competition, many coaches from opposing nations dismissed her as a serious competitor due to her young age and limited experience, and she was not expected to medal. Two-time Olympic gold medalist Ingrid Krämer-Engel of East Germany was considered the likely favorite for the gold. In the early platform competition, Bush established a lead in the first round and remained with a points advantage till the end of the competition. In a close match, Bush finished only 1.35 points ahead of the defending champion and favorite, East Germany's Ingrid Krämer-Engel.

Lesley participated with the 1968 Olympic diving team as well, but unfortunately had a poor initial dive and finished in 20th place. At both the 1964 and 1968 Olympics, she was coached by Dick Smith, who also trained her at the Dick Smith Swim Gym when she lived in Phoenix. She served as an alternate to the U.S. team in the 1972 Olympics.

In the 1967 Pan American Games in Winnipeg, Canada, Bush won the gold in Platform diving. In the 1967 Summer Universiade in Tokyo, Bush won a gold in platform and a silver in springboard diving. At the 1965 Summer Universiade in Budapest, she won a silver in springboard diving.

In her collegiate Senior year, she was married to Indiana University swimmer and 1968 Olympic swimming gold medalist Charles Hickcox on Saturday, December 14, 1968 at St. Charles Borremeo Church in Bloomington, Indiana, near the Indiana University campus, and honeymooned in Montevideo, Uruguay. The couple later divorced. She is the sister of 1972 Olympic diver David Bush. She was later married to fellow high school teacher, David Makepeace, while living in the Florida Keys during the 1980s, where she taught high school biology at Coral Shores High School on Plantation Key on the Southern tip of Florida. She has also served as a science teacher at Thomas R. Grover Middle School in West Windsor, New Jersey.

=== Honors ===
Bush won the Lawrence J. Johnson Award for outstanding diver in 1967, as a recognition that her diving achievements between 1965-67 made her the outstanding water-based athlete among all participants in diving, swimming, synchronized swimming and water polo. She won the Leanne Grotke Award in 2014 and was admitted to the Indiana University Athletics Hall of Fame in 1987. In a more exclusive honor, she was inducted into the International Swimming Hall of Fame in 1986. She received a Silver Anniversary Award from the National Collegiate Athletic Association as part of the Class of 1995.

== See also ==
- List of members of the International Swimming Hall of Fame
