= Gert Kölli =

Austrian swimmer

Personal information
- Born: 31 May 1940 Graz, Nazi Germany
- Died: 2 August 2016 (aged 76) Graz, Austria

Sport
- Sport: Swimming

Gert Kölli (31 May 1940 – 2 August 2016) was an Austrian freestyle swimmer. He competed at the 1960 Summer Olympics and the 1964 Summer Olympics.
