= Gerhard Wieland =

Austrian swimmer

Personal information
- Born: 27 August 1944 (age 81)

Sport
- Sport: Swimming

Gerhard Wieland (born 27 August 1944) is an Austrian former freestyle and backstroke swimmer. He competed in two events at the 1964 Summer Olympics.
