= Bruna Rossi =

Italian diver (born 1948)

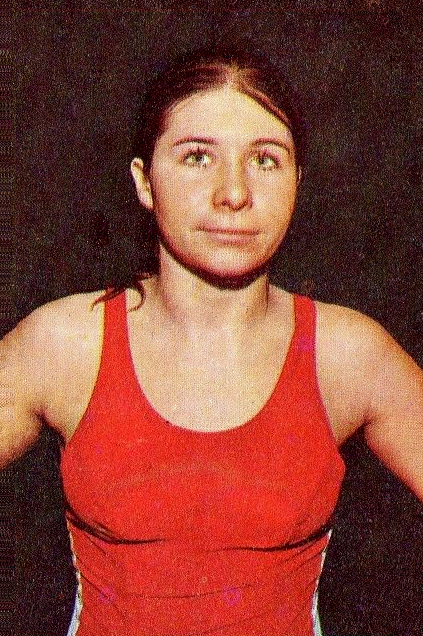

Personal information
- Born: 15 July 1948 (age 77) Rome, Italy
- Height: 1.60 m (5 ft 3 in)
- Weight: 54 kg (119 lb)

Sport
- Sport: Diving

Bruna Rossi (born 15 July 1948) is a retired Italian diver. She competed at the 1968 Summer Olympics in the 10 m platform and finished in 21st place.
