= Tarja Liljeström =

Finnish diver

Personal information
- Nationality: Finnish
- Born: 14 May 1946; Helsinki, Finland
- Died: 15 June 2024 (aged 78)

Sport
- Sport: Diving

Tarja Liljeström (14 May 1946 – 15 June 2024) was a Finnish diver. She competed in two events at the 1968 Summer Olympics.
