= Sue Gossick =

American diver (born 1947)

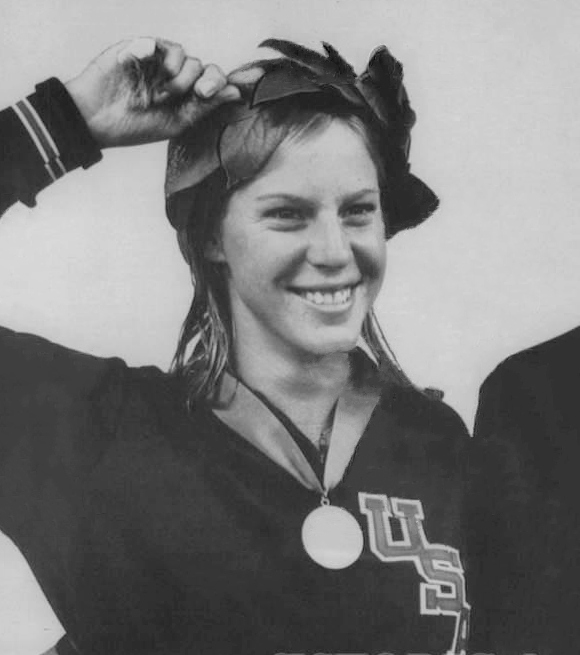
- Gossick at the 1967 Pan American Games

Personal information
- Full name: Susanne Gossick
- Born: November 12, 1947 (age 78) Chicago, Illinois, U.S.
- Height: 5 ft 6 in (168 cm)
- Weight: 115 lb (52 kg)

Sport
- Sport: Diving
- Club: Valley Junior College; Westlake Athletic Club; University of California, Berkeley
- Coached by: Gustav Gossick (father); Lyle Draves
Medal record
Representing the United States
Olympic Games
Gold medal – first place	1968 Mexico City	3 m springboard
Pan American Games
Gold medal – first place	1967 Winnipeg	3 m springboard

Susanne Gossick (born November 12, 1947) is a retired American diver. Competing in the 3 m springboard she won gold medals at the 1967 Pan American Games and 1968 Olympics and placed fourth at the 1964 Olympics.

During her diving career Gossick won five AAU springboard titles. In 1967, she was voted the Los Angeles Times Woman of the Year, becoming the youngest person ever to receive that award. In 1988, she was inducted into the International Swimming Hall of Fame.

== See also ==
- List of members of the International Swimming Hall of Fame
