= Kurt Herbst =

Austrian weightlifter

Personal information
- Nationality: Austrian
- Born: 22 December 1940 (age 85) Vienna, Nazi Germany

Sport
- Sport: Weightlifting
- Competition weight: 86-89kg

Kurt Herbst (born 22 December 1940) is an Austrian weightlifter. He competed at the 1960 Summer Olympics and the 1964 Summer Olympics.
