= Elisabeth Svoboda =

Austrian diver

Personal information
- Nationality: Austrian
- Born: 7 October 1942 (age 82)

Sport
- Sport: Diving

Elisabeth Svoboda (born 7 October 1942) is an Austrian diver. She competed in two events at the 1964 Summer Olympics.
