= Nataliya Kuznetsova-Lobanova =

Soviet diver

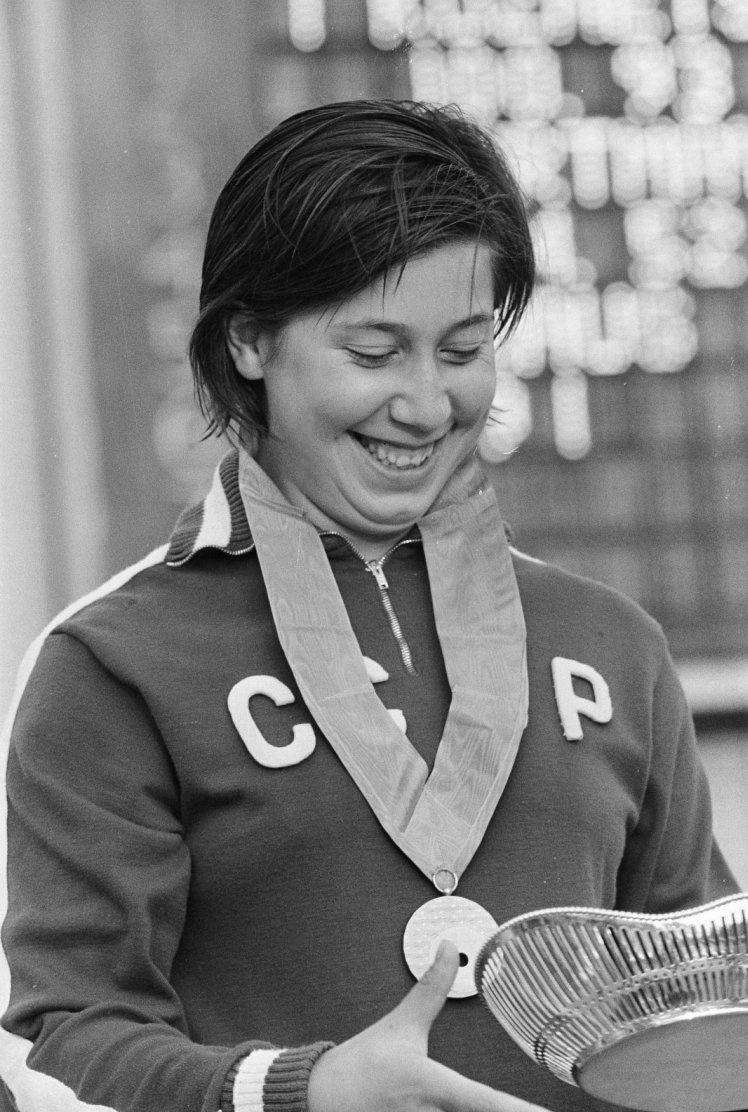
- Nataliya Kuznetsova in 1966

Personal information
- Born: 30 May 1947 Moscow, Soviet Union
- Died: 28 September 1998 (aged 51) Moscow, Russia
- Height: 1.63 m (5 ft 4 in)
- Weight: 61 kg (134 lb)

Sport
- Sport: Diving
- Club: Spartak Moscow
- Coached by: Tatyana Petrukhina
Medal record
Representing the Soviet Union
Olympic Games
Silver medal – second place	1968 Mexico City	Platform
European Championships
Bronze medal – third place	1962 Leipzig	Springboard
Gold medal – first place	1966 Utrecht	Platform

Nataliya Vladimirovna Lobanova (née Kuznetsova, later Lobanova and Timoshinina; Russian: Наталья Владимировна Лобанова née Кузнецова later Тимошинина, 30 May 1947 – 28 September 1998) was a Soviet diver. She competed in the ten m platform at the 1964, 1968 and 1972 Summer Olympics and finished in seventh, second and thirteenth place, respectively. In 1972 she also finished 14th in the three m springboard.

At the European Championships she won a gold medal in the platform in 1966 and a bronze in the springboard in 1962. She was Soviet champion in the platform in 1969 and 1972.

She graduated from the State Central Order of Lenin Institute of Physical Education. After retiring from competitive diving, she worked as a diving coach in Moscow. She was an Honored Coach of Russia. Among her students were her son Vladimir Timoshinin and his wife Svetlana Timoshinina.

She died on 28 September 1998 and was buried at the Danilovsky Cemetery in Moscow.

== Personal life ==
She was the younger sister of Soviet water polo player Vladimir Kuznetsov and wife of Soviet rower Aleksandr Timoshinin.
