= Galina Alekseyeva (diver) =

Soviet diver (1947–2024)

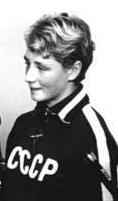
- Alekseyeva at the 1964 Summer Olympics

Personal information
- Born: 27 October 1947 Moscow, Russian SFSR, USSR
- Died: 4 February 2024 (aged 76)

Sport
- Sport: Diving
- Club: Dynamo Moscow
Medal record
Representing the Soviet Union
Bronze medal – third place	1964 Tokyo	10 m platform

Galina Aleksandrovna Alekseyeva (Russian: Галина Александровна Алексеева; 27 October 1947 – 4 February 2024) was a Soviet diver who competed in the 1964 Summer Olympics and 1968 Summer Olympics.

Alekseyeva was born in Moscow on 27 October 1947, and died on 4 February 2024, at the age of 76.
