= Delia Reinhardt (diver) =

German diver

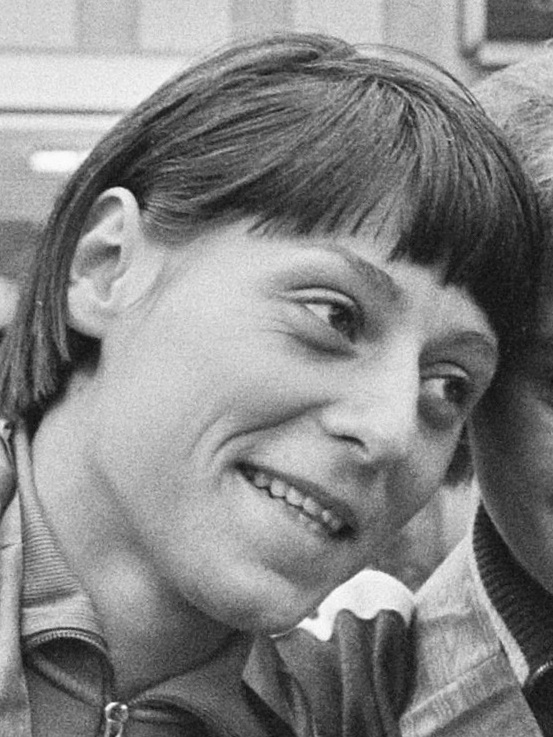
- Delia Reinhard at the European championships 1966

Personal information
- Born: 27 August 1947 (age 78) Berlin, Germany
- Height: 1.66 m (5 ft 5 in)
- Weight: 55 kg (121 lb)

Sport
- Sport: Diving
- Club: Berliner TSC
Medal record
Representing East Germany
European Championships
Silver medal – second place	1966 Utrecht	Springboard

Delia Reinhardt (born 27 August 1947) is a retired German diver. She competed in the 10 m platform at the 1964 Summer Olympics and finished in 10th place. She won a silver medal in the 3 m springboard at the 1966 European Aquatics Championships.
