= Ulrike Sindelar-Pachowsky =

Austrian diver

Personal information
- Nationality: Austrian
- Born: 25 June 1943 (age 82)

Sport
- Sport: Diving

Ulrike Sindelar-Pachowsky (born 25 June 1943) is an Austrian diver. She competed in two events at the 1964 Summer Olympics.
