= Keiko Osaki =

Japanese diver (born 1942)

Personal information
- Nationality: Japanese
- Born: 15 October 1942 (age 83)

Sport
- Sport: Diving
Medal record
Women's diving
Representing Japan
Summer Universiade
Silver medal – second place	1967 Tokyo	Platform
Asian Games
Gold medal – first place	1966 Bangkok	3m springboard
Gold medal – first place	1966 Bangkok	10m platform

Keiko Osaki (大崎恵子, Ōsaki Keiko; born 15 October 1942) is a Japanese diver. She competed at the 1964 Summer Olympics, the 1968 Summer Olympics and the 1972 Summer Olympics.
