= Ingeborg Pertmayr =

Austrian diver

Personal information
- Nationality: Austrian
- Born: 7 April 1947 Vienna, Austria
- Died: 21 June 2010 (aged 63)

Sport
- Sport: Diving
Medal record
Women's diving
Representing Austria
European Championships
Silver medal – second place	1966 Utrecht	10 m platform
Universiade
Bronze medal – third place	1967 Tokyo	3 m springboard

Ingeborg Pertmayr (7 April 1947 – 21 June 2010) was an Austrian diver. She competed at the 1964 Summer Olympics, the 1968 Summer Olympics and the 1972 Summer Olympics.
