= 1965 Summer Universiade =

Multi-sport event in Budapest, Hungary

IV Summer Universiade IV. Nyári Universiade
- Host city: Budapest, Hungary
- Country: Hungary
- Nations: 32
- Athletes: 1,729
- Events: 73 in 9 sports
- Opening: August 20, 1965
- Closing: August 30, 1965
- Opened by: István Dobi
- Main venue: Stadium Puskás Ferenc

The 1965 Summer Universiade, also known as the IV Summer Universiade, took place in Budapest, Hungary.

== Sports at the 1965 Summer Universiade ==
- Athletics (30)
- Basketball (2)
- Diving (4)
- Fencing (8)
- Gymnastics (4)
- Swimming (17)
- Tennis (5)
- Volleyball (2)
- Water polo (1)

== Medal table ==
* Host nation (Hungary)

Rank	Nation	Gold	Silver	Bronze	Total
1	Hungary (HUN)*	16	8	15	39
2	Soviet Union (URS)	14	26	15	55
3	United States (USA)	14	10	7	31
4	Italy (ITA)	6	2	1	9
5	Japan (JPN)	5	0	2	7
6	Poland (POL)	4	4	3	11
7	Romania (ROU)	4	2	6	12
8	West Germany (FRG)	4	2	4	10
9	France (FRA)	2	3	3	8
10	Great Britain (GBR)	1	4	4	9
11	Bulgaria (BUL)	1	2	1	4
12	Yugoslavia (YUG)	1	1	3	5
13	Canada (CAN)	1	0	3	4
14	Sweden (SWE)	1	0	1	2
15	Czechoslovakia (TCH)	0	3	2	5
16	Netherlands (NED)	0	3	1	4
17	Cuba (CUB)	0	2	0	2
18	Austria (AUT)	0	0	2	2
Totals (18 entries)		74	72	73	219
