= United States at the 1964 Summer Olympics =

- Flag of the United States
- IOC code: USA
- NOC: United States Olympic Committee

in Tokyo
- Competitors: 346 (267 men and 79 women) in 19 sports
- Flag bearer: Parry O'Brien
- Medals Ranked 1st: Gold 36 Silver 26 Bronze 28 Total 90

Summer Olympics appearances (overview)
- 1896; 1900; 1904; 1908; 1912; 1920; 1924; 1928; 1932; 1936; 1948; 1952; 1956; 1960; 1964; 1968; 1972; 1976; 1980; 1984; 1988; 1992; 1996; 2000; 2004; 2008; 2012; 2016; 2020; 2024; 2028

Other related appearances
- 1906 Intercalated Games

The United States competed at the 1964 Summer Olympics in Tokyo, Japan. 346 competitors, 267 men and 79 women, took part in 159 events in 19 sports.

== Medalists ==
The United States finished first in the final medal rankings, with 36 gold and 90 total medals.

The following U.S. competitors won medals at the games. In the discipline sections below, the medalists' names are bolded.

Medal	Name	Sport	Event	Date
Gold	Don Schollander	Swimming	Men's 100 m freestyle	October 12
Gold	Jed Graef	Swimming	Men's 200 m backstroke	October 13
Gold	Billy Mills	Athletics	Men's 10,000 m	October 14
Gold	Kenneth Sitzberger	Diving	Men's 3 m springboard	October 14
Gold	Dick Roth	Swimming	Men's 400 m individual medley	October 14
Gold	Mike Austin; Steve Clark; Gary Ilman; Don Schollander; Lary Schulhof^{[a]}	Swimming	Men's 4 × 100 m freestyle relay	October 14
Gold	Cathy Ferguson	Swimming	Women's 100 m backstroke	October 14
Gold	Al Oerter	Athletics	Men's discus throw	October 15
Gold	Bob Hayes	Athletics	Men's 100 m	October 15
Gold	Lesley Bush	Diving	Women's 10 m platform	October 15
Gold	Edward Ferry; Conn Findlay; Kent Mitchell	Rowing	Coxed pair	October 15
Gold	Joseph Amlong; Thomas Amlong; Boyce Budd; Emory Clark; Stanley Cwiklinski; Hugh Foley; Bill Knecht; William Stowe; Róbert Zimonyi	Rowing	Eight	October 15
Gold	Gary Anderson	Shooting	300 m rifle three positions	October 15
Gold	Don Schollander	Swimming	Men's 400 m freestyle	October 15
Gold	Lynne Allsup^{[a]} Erika Bricker^{[a]} Donna de Varona; Kathy Ellis; Jeanne Hallock^{[a]} Patience Sherman^{[a]} Sharon Stouder; Lillian Watson	Swimming	Women's 4 × 100 m freestyle relay	October 15
Gold	Rex Cawley	Athletics	Men's 400 m hurdles	October 16
Gold	Wyomia Tyus	Athletics	Women's 100 m	October 16
Gold	Bob Bennett^{[a]} Steve Clark; Bill Craig; Virgil Luken^{[a]} Thompson Mann; Richard McGeagh^{[a]} Walter Richardson^{[a]} Fred Schmidt	Swimming	Men's 4 × 100 m medley relay	October 16
Gold	Sharon Stouder	Swimming	Women's 100 m butterfly	October 16
Gold	Henry Carr	Athletics	Men's 200 m	October 17
Gold	Fred Hansen	Athletics	Men's pole vault	October 17
Gold	Dallas Long	Athletics	Men's shot put	October 17
Gold	Donna de Varona	Swimming	Women's 400 m individual medley	October 17
Gold	Bob Schul	Athletics	Men's 5000 m	October 18
Gold	Hayes Jones	Athletics	Men's 110 m hurdles	October 18
Gold	Bob Webster	Diving	Men's 10 m platform	October 18
Gold	Steve Clark; Gary Ilman; David Lyons^{[a]} Bill Mettler^{[a]} Roy Saari; Don Schollander; Ed Townsend^{[a]} Michael Wall^{[a]}	Swimming	Men's 4 × 200 m freestyle relay	October 18
Gold	Ginny Duenkel	Swimming	Women's 400 m freestyle	October 18
Gold	Kathy Ellis; Cathy Ferguson; Cynthia Goyette; Nina Harmer^{[a]} Susan Pitt^{[a]} Judy Reeder^{[a]} Sharon Stouder; Lillian Watson^{[a]}	Swimming	Women's 4 × 100 m medley relay	October 18
Gold	Mike Larrabee	Athletics	Men's 400 m	October 19
Gold	Edith McGuire	Athletics	Women's 200 m	October 19
Gold	Lones Wigger	Shooting	50 m rifle three positions	October 20
Gold	Gerry Ashworth; Paul Drayton; Bob Hayes; Richard Stebbins	Athletics	Men's 4 × 100 m relay	October 21
Gold	Henry Carr; Ollan Cassell; Mike Larrabee; Ulis Williams	Athletics	Men's 4 × 400 m relay	October 21
Gold	United States men's national basketball team: Jim Barnes; Bill Bradley; Larry Brown; Joe Caldwell; Mel Counts; Dick Davies; Walt Hazzard; Lucious Jackson; Pete McCaffrey; Jeff Mullins; Jerry Shipp; George Wilson	Basketball	Men's tournament	October 23
Gold	Joe Frazier	Boxing	Heavyweight	October 23
Silver	Jeanne Collier	Diving	Women's 3 m springboard	October 12
Silver	Claudia Kolb	Swimming	Women's 200 m breaststroke	October 12
Silver	Isaac Berger	Weightlifting	60 kg	October 12
Silver	Gary Dilley	Swimming	Men's 200 m backstroke	October 13
Silver	Sharon Stouder	Swimming	Women's 100 m freestyle	October 13
Silver	Frank Gorman	Diving	Men's 3 m springboard	October 14
Silver	Roy Saari	Swimming	Men's 400 m individual medley	October 14
Silver	David Kirkwood; James Moore; Paul Pesthy	Modern pentathlon	Team	October 15
Silver	Seymour Cromwell; Jim Storm	Rowing	Double sculls	October 15
Silver	Edith McGuire	Athletics	Women's 100 m	October 16
Silver	Lones Wigger	Shooting	50 m rifle prone	October 16
Silver	Paul Drayton	Athletics	Men's 200 m	October 17
Silver	Randy Matson	Athletics	Men's shot put	October 17
Silver	John Nelson	Swimming	Men's 1500 m freestyle	October 17
Silver	Sharon Finneran	Swimming	Women's 400 m individual medley	October 17
Silver	Blaine Lindgren	Athletics	Men's 110 m hurdles	October 18
Silver	Ralph Boston	Athletics	Men's long jump	October 18
Silver	Franklin Green	Shooting	50 m pistol	October 18
Silver	Carl Robie	Swimming	Men's 200 m butterfly	October 18
Silver	Marilyn Ramenofsky	Swimming	Women's 400 m freestyle	October 18
Silver	Lana duPont; Kevin Freeman; Michael Page; Michael Plumb	Equestrian	Team eventing	October 19
Silver	Edith McGuire; Wyomia Tyus; Marilyn White; Wilye White	Athletics	Women's 4 × 100 m relay	October 21
Silver	John Thomas	Athletics	Men's high jump	October 21
Silver	Peter Barrett	Sailing	Finn	October 21
Silver	Richard Stearns; Lynn Williams	Sailing	Star	October 21
Silver	Francine Fox; Glorianne Perrier	Canoeing	Women's K-2 500 m	October 22
Bronze	Patsy Willard	Diving	Women's 3 m springboard	October 12
Bronze	Bob Bennett	Swimming	Men's 200 m backstroke	October 13
Bronze	Kathy Ellis	Swimming	Women's 100 m freestyle	October 13
Bronze	Lawrence Andreasen	Diving	Men's 3 m springboard	October 14
Bronze	Ginny Duenkel	Swimming	Women's 100 m backstroke	October 14
Bronze	Daniel Brand	Wrestling	Freestyle middleweight	October 14
Bronze	Dave Weill	Athletics	Men's discus throw	October 15
Bronze	Dick Lyon; Ted Mittet; Ted Nash; Geoffrey Picard	Rowing	Coxless four	October 15
Bronze	Martin Gunnarsson	Shooting	300 m rifle three positions	October 15
Bronze	Chet Jastremski	Swimming	Men's 200 m breaststroke	October 15
Bronze	Tommy Pool	Shooting	50 m rifle prone	October 16
Bronze	Kathy Ellis	Swimming	Women's 100 m butterfly	October 16
Bronze	William Morris	Shooting	Trap	October 17
Bronze	Martha Randall	Swimming	Women's 400 m individual medley	October 17
Bronze	Bill Dellinger	Athletics	Men's 5000 m	October 18
Bronze	Tom Gompf	Diving	Men's 10 m platform	October 18
Bronze	Fred Schmidt	Swimming	Men's 200 m butterfly	October 18
Bronze	Terri Stickles	Swimming	Women's 400 m freestyle	October 18
Bronze	Norbert Schemansky	Weightlifting	+90 kg	October 18
Bronze	John Rambo	Athletics	Men's high jump	October 21
Bronze	Robert Carmody	Boxing	Flyweight	October 21
Bronze	Charles Brown	Boxing	Featherweight	October 21
Bronze	Ronald Allen Harris	Boxing	Lightweight	October 21
Bronze	Jim Bregman	Judo	80 kg	October 21
Bronze	William Bentsen; Buddy Melges	Sailing	Flying Dutchman	October 21
Bronze	Richard Deaver; Lowell North; Charles Rogers	Sailing	Dragon	October 21
Bronze	Joseph Batchelder; John McNamara; Francis Scully	Sailing	5.5 Meter	October 21
Bronze	Marcia Jones	Canoeing	Women's K-1 500 m	October 22

Medals by sport
Sport	1st place, gold medalist(s)	2nd place, silver medalist(s)	3rd place, bronze medalist(s)	Total
Athletics	14	7	3	**24**
Swimming	13	8	8	**29**
Diving	3	2	3	**8**
Shooting	2	2	3	**7**
Rowing	2	1	1	**4**
Boxing	1	0	3	**4**
Basketball	1	0	0	**1**
Sailing	0	2	3	**5**
Canoeing	0	1	1	**2**
Weightlifting	0	1	1	**2**
Equestrian	0	1	0	**1**
Modern pentathlon	0	1	0	**1**
Judo	0	0	1	**1**
Wrestling	0	0	1	**1**
Total	36	26	28	90

Medals by day
Day	Date	1st place, gold medalist(s)	2nd place, silver medalist(s)	3rd place, bronze medalist(s)	Total
1	October 11	0	0	0	**0**
2	October 12	1	3	1	**5**
3	October 13	1	2	2	**5**
4	October 14	5	2	3	**10**
5	October 15	8	2	4	**14**
6	October 16	4	2	2	**8**
7	October 17	4	4	2	**10**
8	October 18	6	5	5	**16**
9	October 19	2	1	0	**3**
10	October 20	1	0	0	**1**
11	October 21	2	4	8	**14**
12	October 22	0	1	1	**2**
13	October 23	2	0	0	**2**
14	October 24	0	0	0	**0**
Total		36	26	28	90

Medals by gender
Gender	1st place, gold medalist(s)	2nd place, silver medalist(s)	3rd place, bronze medalist(s)	Total
Male	27	17	21	**65**
Female	9	8	7	**24**
Mixed	0	1	0	**1**
Total	36	26	28	90

Multiple medalists
Name	Sport	1st place, gold medalist(s)	2nd place, silver medalist(s)	3rd place, bronze medalist(s)	Total
Don Schollander	Swimming	4	0	0	**4**
Sharon Stouder	Swimming	3	1	0	**4**
Kathy Ellis	Swimming	2	0	2	**4**
Steve Clark	Swimming	3	0	0	**3**
Edith McGuire	Athletics	1	2	0	**3**
Henry Carr	Athletics	2	0	0	**2**
Donna de Varona	Swimming	2	0	0	**2**
Cathy Ferguson	Swimming	2	0	0	**2**
Bob Hayes	Athletics	2	0	0	**2**
Gary Ilman	Swimming	2	0	0	**2**
Mike Larrabee	Athletics	2	0	0	**2**
Lillian Watson	Swimming	2	0	0	**2**
Paul Drayton	Athletics	1	1	0	**2**
Roy Saari	Swimming	1	1	0	**2**
Wyomia Tyus	Athletics	1	1	0	**2**
Lones Wigger	Shooting	1	1	0	**2**
Bob Bennett	Swimming	1	0	1	**2**
Ginny Duenkel	Swimming	1	0	1	**2**
Fred Schmidt	Swimming	1	0	1	**2**

^{a} Athletes who participated in the heats only.

== Athletics ==
Key

- Note–Ranks given for track events are within the athlete's heat only
- Q = Qualified for the next round
- q = Qualified for the next round as a fastest loser or, in field events, by position without achieving the qualifying target

Track & road events
Men

Athlete	Event	Heat		Quarterfinal		Semifinal		Final	
Athlete	Event	Time	Rank	Time	Rank	Time	Rank	Time	Rank
Bob Hayes	100 m	10.4	1 Q	10.3	1 Q	9.9	1 Q	10.0	1st place, gold medalist(s)
T.J. Jackson	100 m	10.5	1 Q	10.4	2 Q	10.6	8	Did not advance	
Mel Pender	100 m	10.5	2 Q	10.4	2 Q	10.4	4 Q	10.4	=6
Henry Carr	200 m	21.1	2 Q	21.0	1 Q	20.6	1 Q	20.3 OR	1st place, gold medalist(s)
Paul Drayton	200 m	20.7	1 Q	20.9	1 Q	20.5	1 Q	20.5	2nd place, silver medalist(s)
Richard Stebbins	200 m	21.1	2 Q	21.2	2 Q	20.8	3 Q	20.8	7
Ollan Cassell	400 m	46.8	1 Q	46.2	2 Q	46.6	5	Did not advance	
Mike Larrabee	400 m	46.8	1 Q	46.5	1 Q	46.0	1 Q	45.1	1st place, gold medalist(s)
Ulis Williams	400 m	46.2	1 Q	46.9	2 Q	46.2	3 Q	46.0	5
Tom Farrell	800 m	1:48.6	2 Q	—N/a		1:47.8	2 Q	1:46.6	5
Morgan Groth	800 m	1:51.4	6	—N/a		Did not advance			
Jerry Siebert	800 m	1:49.2	2 Q	—N/a		1:47.0	2 Q	1:47.0	6
Dyrol Burleson	1500 m	3:45.6	3 Q	—N/a		3:41.5	1 Q	3:40.0	5
Tom O'Hara	1500 m	3:46.7	3 Q	—N/a		3:43.4	7	Did not advance	
Jim Ryun	1500 m	3:44.4	4 Q	—N/a		3:55.0	9	Did not advance	
Bill Dellinger	5000 m	13:52.2	2 Q	—N/a				13:49.8	3rd place, bronze medalist(s)
Oscar Moore	5000 m	14:24.0	8	—N/a				Did not advance	
Bob Schul	5000 m	14:11.4	2 Q	—N/a				13:48.8	1st place, gold medalist(s)
Ron Larrieu	10,000 m	—N/a						30:42.6	24
Gerry Lindgren	10,000 m	—N/a						29:20.6	9
Billy Mills	10,000 m	—N/a						28:24.4 OR	1st place, gold medalist(s)
Willie Davenport	110 m hurdles	14.2	2 Q	—N/a		14.2	7	Did not advance	
Hayes Jones	110 m hurdles	14.2	2 Q	—N/a		14.0	3 Q	13.6	1st place, gold medalist(s)
Blaine Lindgren	110 m hurdles	14.2	1 Q	—N/a		13.9	1 Q	13.7	2nd place, silver medalist(s)
Rex Cawley	400 m hurdles	50.8	1 Q	—N/a		49.8	1 Q	49.6	1st place, gold medalist(s)
Billy Hardin	400 m hurdles	51.3	1 Q	—N/a		50.9	6	Did not advance	
Jay Luck	400 m hurdles	51.7	3 Q	—N/a		50.4	2 Q	50.5	5
Jeff Fishback	3000 m steeplechase	8:50.2	4	—N/a				Did not advance	
George Young	3000 m steeplechase	8:34.2	3 Q	—N/a				8:38.2	5
Vic Zwolak	3000 m steeplechase	8:43.6	4	—N/a				Did not advance	
Gerry Ashworth; Paul Drayton; Bob Hayes; Richard Stebbins	4 × 100 m relay	39.8	1 Q	—N/a		39.5	1 Q	39.0 WR	1st place, gold medalist(s)
Henry Carr; Ollan Cassell; Mike Larrabee; Ulis Williams	4 × 400 m relay	3:05.3	1 Q	—N/a				3:00.7 WR	1st place, gold medalist(s)
Buddy Edelen	Marathon	—N/a						2:18:12.4	6
Pete McArdle	Marathon	—N/a						1:26:24.4	23
Billy Mills	Marathon	—N/a						2:22:55.4	14
Ron Laird	20 km walk	—N/a						DSQ	
Jack Mortland	20 km walk	—N/a						1:36:35.0	17
Ronald Zinn	20 km walk	—N/a						1:32:43.0	6
Mike Brodie	50 km walk	—N/a						4:57:41.0	29
Bruce MacDonald	50 km walk	—N/a						4:45:10.4	26
Chris McCarthy	50 km walk	—N/a						4:35:41.6	21

Women

Athlete	Event	Heat		Quarterfinal		Semifinal		Final	
Athlete	Event	Time	Rank	Time	Rank	Time	Rank	Time	Rank
Edith McGuire	100 m	11.4	1 Q	11.4	1 Q	11.6	3 Q	11.6	2nd place, silver medalist(s)
Wyomia Tyus	100 m	11.3	1 Q	11.2 OR	1 Q	11.3	1 Q	11.4	1st place, gold medalist(s)
Marilyn White	100 m	11.2	1 Q	11.5	2 Q	11.5	3 Q	11.6	4
Vivian Brown	200 m	24.1	3 q	—N/a		24.3	8	Did not advance	
Edith McGuire	200 m	23.4	1 Q	—N/a		23.3	1 Q	23.0 OR	1st place, gold medalist(s)
Debbie Thompson	200 m	24.6	4	—N/a		Did not advance			
Janell Smith	400 m	55.5	5 Q	—N/a		54.5	6	Did not advance	
Sandy Knott	800 m	2:12.2	6	—N/a		Did not advance			
Rosie Bonds	80 m hurdles	10.6	1 Q	—N/a		10.8	4 Q	10.8	8
Lacey O'Neal	80 m hurdles	10.9	4 Q	—N/a		10.9	7	Did not advance	
Cherrie Sherrard	80 m hurdles	11.00	5	—N/a		Did not advance			
Edith McGuire; Wyomia Tyus; Marilyn White; Willye White	4 × 100 m relay	44.8	1 Q	—N/a				43.9	2nd place, silver medalist(s)

Field events
Men

Athlete	Event	Qualification		Final	
Athlete	Event	Result	Rank	Result	Rank
Ralph Boston	Long jump	8.03	1 Q	8.03	2nd place, silver medalist(s)
Gayle Hopkins	Long jump	7.67	4 Q	NM	
Phil Shinnick	Long jump	7.26	22	Did not advance	
Ira Davis	Triple jump	16.29	2 Q	16.00	9
Kent Floerke	Triple jump	15.36	21	Did not advance	
Bill Sharpe	Triple jump	15.80	13 Q	15.84	11
Ed Caruthers	High jump	2.06	=8 Q	2.09	8
John Rambo	High jump	2.06	=8 Q	2.16	3rd place, bronze medalist(s)
John Thomas	High jump	2.06	6 Q	2.18 OR	2nd place, silver medalist(s)
Fred Hansen	Pole vault	4.60	=1 Q	5.10 OR	1st place, gold medalist(s)
Billy Gene Pemelton	Pole vault	4.60	=1 Q	4.80	8
John Pennel	Pole vault	4.60	17 Q	4.70	11
Dallas Long	Shot put	19.51	1 Q	20.33 OR	1st place, gold medalist(s)
Randy Matson	Shot put	18.92	2 Q	20.20	2nd place, silver medalist(s)
Parry O'Brien	Shot put	17.84	11 Q	19.20	4
Al Oerter	Discus throw	60.54 OR	1 Q	61.00 OR	1st place, gold medalist(s)
Jay Silvester	Discus throw	57.81	3 Q	59.09	4
Dave Weill	Discus throw	56.95	5 Q	59.49	3rd place, bronze medalist(s)
Frank Covelli	Javelin throw	68.08	21	Did not advance	
Les Tipton	Javelin throw	70.74	16	Did not advance	
Ed Red	Javelin throw	72.31	12 q	71.52	11
Ed Burke	Hammer throw	64.49	8 Q	65.66	7
Hal Connolly	Hammer throw	67.40 OR	2 Q	66.65	6
Albert Hall	Hammer throw	64.31	11 Q	63.82	12

Women

Athlete	Event	Qualification		Final	
Athlete	Event	Result	Rank	Result	Rank
Jo Ann Grissom	Long jump	5.91	19	Did not advance	
Martha Watson	Long jump	5.94	18	Did not advance	
Willye White	Long jump	6.28	=8 Q	6.07	12
Estelle Baskerville	High jump	1.65	=19	Did not advance	
Terri Brown	High jump	1.68	12 q	NM	
Eleanor Montgomery	High jump	1.70	9 Q	1.71	8
Earlene Brown	Shot put	15.44	7 Q	14.80	12
Olga Connolly	Discus throw	53.17	6 Q	51.58	12
RaNae Bair	Javelin throw	46.89	13	Did not advance	

Combined event – Men's decathlon

Athlete	Event	100 m	LJ	SP	HJ	400 m	110H	DT	PV	JT	1500 m	Final	Rank
Dick Emberger	Result	11.2	6.72	11.80	1.90	49.1	14.9	35.32	3.70	57.54	4:19.3	7292	10
Dick Emberger	Points	756	761	586	769	847	859	590	728	731	665	7292	10
Paul Herman	Result	11.2	6.97	13.89	1.87	49.2	15.2	44.15	4.35	63.35	4:25.4	7787	4
Paul Herman	Points	756	814	721	743	842	827	765	896	802	621	7787	4
Russ Hodge	Result	11.0	6.75	14.93	1.75	49.6	16.0	44.64	3.70	50.21	4:24.9	7325	9
Russ Hodge	Points	804	767	784	634	824	748	775	728	636	629	7325	9

Combined event – Women's pentathlon

Athlete	Event	80H	SP	HJ	LJ	200 m	Final	Rank
Pat Winslow	Result	12.0	13.04	1.63	5.90	24.6	4724	7
Pat Winslow	Points	890	924	976	966	968	4724	7

== Basketball ==
Summary

Team	Event	Preliminary round								Semifinal / Pl.	Final / BM / Cl.	
Team	Event	Opposition Result	Opposition Result	Opposition Result	Opposition Result	Opposition Result	Opposition Result	Opposition Result	Rank	Opposition Result	Opposition Result	Rank
United States men	Men's tournament	Australia; W 78–45	Finland; W 77–51	Peru; W 60–54	Uruguay; W 83–28	Yugoslavia; W 69–61	Brazil; W 86–53	South Korea; W 116–50	1 Q	Puerto Rico; W 62–42	Soviet Union; W 73–59	1st place, gold medalist(s)

Roster

Name	Position	Height	Weight	Age	Team/School	Home Town
Jim Barnes	C	6'8"	240	23	Texas Western College	Stillwater, Oklahoma
Bill Bradley	G/F	6'5"	205	21	Princeton University	Crystal City, Missouri
Larry Brown	G	5'10"	165	24	Goodyear Wingfoots	Long Beach, New York
Joe Caldwell	G/F	6'5"	195	22	Arizona State University	Los Angeles, California
Mel Counts	C	7'0"	230	23	Oregon State University	Coos Bay, Oregon
Dick Davies	G	6'1"	175	28	Goodyear Wingfoots (LSU)	Harrisburg, Pennsylvania
Walt Hazzard	G/F	6'3"	188	22	Univ. of California-Los Angeles	Philadelphia, Pennsylvania
Lucious Jackson	F	6'9"	238	22	Pan American University	Bastrop, Louisiana
Pete McCaffrey	F	6'5"	190	25	Goodyear Wingfoots (LSU)	Tulsa, Oklahoma
Jeff Mullins	G/F	6'4"	185	22	Duke University	Lexington, Kentucky
Jerry Shipp	G	6'5"	190	29	Phillips 66ers (SE Oklahoma St.)	Blue, Oklahoma
George Wilson	F	6'8"	210	22	Chicago Jamaco Saints (Cincinnati)	Chicago, Illinois

The 1964 United States Olympic basketball team featured college and AAU players. Jerry Shipp led the team with an average of 12.4 points per game.

== Boxing ==
Future world champion Joe Frazier won the only U.S. gold medal in boxing at these Games. Entering as a 20-year-old alternate, he fought his way against older and more experienced opponents and won the Olympic title despite having fought with a broke thumb.

Athlete	Event	Round of 64	Round of 32	Round of 16	Quarterfinal	Semifinal	Final	
Athlete	Event	Opposition Result	Opposition Result	Opposition Result	Opposition Result	Opposition Result	Opposition Result	Rank
Robert Carmody	Flyweight	—N/a	Bye	Thapa (NEP); W RSC	Babiasch (EUA); W 4–1	Atzori (ITA); L 1–4	Did not advance	3rd place, bronze medalist(s)
Louis Johnson	Bantamweight	—N/a	Huppen (NED); W 5–0	Puiu (ROU); L 0–5	Did not advance			
Charles Brown	Featherweight	—N/a	Hope (AUS); W 5–0	Khieu (CAM); W 4–1	Duran (MEX); W 4–1	Villanueva (PHI); L 1–4	Did not advance	3rd place, bronze medalist(s)
Ronald Allen Harris	Lightweight	Bye	Hassan (UAR); W KO	Shiratori (JPN); W 5–0	Arpon (PHI); W 5–0	Grudzień (POL); L 1–4	Did not advance	3rd place, bronze medalist(s)
Charley Ellis	Light welterweight	Bye	Winter (EUA); W 5–0	Frolov (URS); L 2–3	Did not advance			
Maurice Frilot	Welterweight	—N/a	Mabwa (UGA); L 0–5	Did not advance				
Tolman Gibson	Light middleweight	—N/a	Sangthein (THA); W RSC	Davies (GHA); L 0–5	Did not advance			
James Rosette	Middleweight	—N/a	Bye	Darkey (GHA); L 2–3	Did not advance			
Robert Christopherson	Light heavyweight	—N/a	Ali (PAK); W 5–0	Kiselyov (URS); L 0–5	Did not advance			
Joe Frazier	Heavyweight	—N/a		Oywello (UGA); W RSC	McQueen (AUS); W RSC	Yemelyanov (URS); W RSC	Huber (EUA); W 3–2	1st place, gold medalist(s)

== Canoeing ==
Men

Athlete	Event	Heat		Repechage		Semifinal		Final	
Athlete	Event	Time	Rank	Time	Rank	Time	Rank	Time	Rank
Dennis van Valkenburgh	C-1 1000 m	5:12.63	5 SF	—N/a		5:00.43	3 Q	5:12.55	8
Joseph Dronzek; James O'Rourke Jr.	C-2 1000 m	4:51.65	6 SF	—N/a		4:51.98	5	Did not advance	
Tony Ralphs	K-1 1000 m	4:21.53	5 R	5:09.14	3 SF	DNS		Did not advance	
Gert Grigoleit; Tony Ralphs	K-2 1000 m	3:54.01	7 R	3:54.31	4	Did not advance			
William Jewell; Tony Ralphs; Walter Richards; William Smoke	K-4 1000 m	3:35.74	6 R	3:46.48	4	Did not advance			

Women

Athlete	Event	Heat		Semifinal		Final	
Athlete	Event	Time	Rank	Time	Rank	Time	Rank
Marica Jones	K-1 500 m	2:11.50	2 Q	Bye		2:15.68	3rd place, bronze medalist(s)
Francine Fox; Glorianne Perrier	K-2 500 m	1:59.69	2 Q	Bye		1:59.16	2nd place, silver medalist(s)

Qualification legend: Q = Qualify to final; SF = Qualify to semifinal; R = Qualify to repehcage

== Cycling ==
Sixteen cyclists represented the United States in 1964.

=== Road ===
Athlete	Event	Time	Rank
John Allis	Individual road race	4:39:5183	75
Raymond Castilloux	Individual road race	DNF	
Michael Hiltner	Individual road race	4:59:54.00	100
Thomas Montemage	Individual road race	DNF	
Michael Allen; John Allis; Wes Chowen; Michael Hiltner	Team time trial	2:40:30.13	20

=== Track ===
Pursuit

Athlete	Event	Heat		Quarterfinal	Semifinal	Final / BM	
Athlete	Event	Time	Rank	Opposition Result	Opposition Result	Opposition Result	Rank
Skip Cutting	Individual	5:25.59	16	Did not advance			
Oliver Martin; Donald Nelsen; Arnold Uhrlass; Hans Wolf	Team	5:01.41	12	Did not advance			

Sprint

Athlete	Event	Round 1	Repechage 1	Repechage 2	Round of 16	Repechage 3	Repechage 4	Quarterfinal	Semifinal	Final / BM	
Athlete	Event	Opposition Result	Opposition Result	Opposition Result	Opposition Result	Opposition Result	Opposition Result	Opposition Result	Opposition Result	Opposition Result	Rank
Alan Grieco	Individual	Gibbon (TTO), Kučírek (TCH); L	Fredborg (DEN), Mercado (MEX); L	Did not advance							
Jackie Simes	Individual	Mercado (MEX), Sato (JPN); L	Fuggerer (EUA); L	Did not advance							
Jack Disney; Tim Mountford	Tandem	Barton / Church (GBR), de Graaf / van der Touw (NED); L	Paar / Štark (TCH); L	Did not advance	—N/a			Did not advance			

Time trial

Athlete	Event	Time	Rank
William Kund	1000 m time trial	1:12.89	14

== Diving ==
Men

Athlete	Event	Preliminary		Final		Total	
Athlete	Event	Score	Rank	Score	Rank	Score	Rank
Lawrence Andreasen	3 m springboard	100.31	2 Q	4.46	6	143.77	3rd place, bronze medalist(s)
Frank Gorman	3 m springboard	105.99	1 Q	51.64	2	157.63	2nd place, silver medalist(s)
Kenneth Sitzberger	3 m springboard	98.66	3 Q	61.24	1	159.90	1st place, gold medalist(s)
Tom Gompf	10 m platform	92.79	7 Q	53.78	2	146.57	3rd place, bronze medalist(s)
Louis Vitucci	10 m platform	86.40	19	Did not advance			
Bob Webster	10 m platform	93.18	6 Q	55.40	1	148.58	1st place, gold medalist(s)

Women

Athlete	Event	Preliminary		Final		Total	
Athlete	Event	Score	Rank	Score	Rank	Score	Rank
Jeanne Collier	3 m springboard	89.94	3 Q	48.42	2	138.36	2nd place, silver medalist(s)
Sue Gossick	3 m springboard	89.29	4 Q	40.41	5	129.70	4
Patsy Willard	3 m springboard	92.68	2 Q	45.50	3	138.18	3rd place, bronze medalist(s)
Lesley Bush	10 m platform	53.78	1 Q	46.02	2	99.80	1st place, gold medalist(s)
Linda Cooper	10 m platform	47.80	9 Q	48.50	1	96.30	4
Barbara Talmage	10 m platform	47.28	11 Q	42.32	7	89.60	8

== Equestrian ==
Dressage

Athlete	Horse	Event	Preliminary		Final	
Athlete	Horse	Event	Score	Rank	Score	Rank
Patricia de la Tour	Path Patrick	Individual	783.0	8	Did not advance	
Karen McIntosh	Malteser	Individual	640.0	17	Did not advance	
Jessica Newberry	Forstrat	Individual	707.0	14	Did not advance	
Patricia de la Tour; Karen McIntosh; Jessica Newberry	See above	Team	2130.0	4	—N/a	

Eventing

Athlete	Horse	Event	Dressage		Endurance		Jumping		Total	
Athlete	Horse	Event	Penalties	Rank	Penalties	Rank	Penalties	Rank	Penalties	Rank
Lana duPont	Mr. Wister	Individual	52.33	=10	141.60	36	30.00	=26	223.39	33
Kevin Freeman	Gallopade	Individual	69.67	=36	–96.80	9	10.00	=13	–17.13	12
Michael Page	The Grasshopper	Individual	43.00	6	–90.40	13	0.00	=1	–47.40	4
Michael Plumb	Bold Minstrel	Individual	42.67	=4	–44.00	23	0.00	=1	–1.33	15
Lana duPont; Kevin Freeman; Michael Page; Michael Plumb	See above	Team	—N/a						–65.86	2nd place, silver medalist(s)

Jumping

Athlete	Horse	Event	Round 1	Round 2	Total	
Athlete	Horse	Event	Faults	Faults	Faults	Rank
Frank Chapot	San Lucas	Individual	12.50	8.00	20.50	7
Kathryn Kusner	Untouchable	Individual	13.75	16.00	29.75	13
Mary Mairs	Tomboy	Individual	44.50	12.25	56.75	33
Frank Chapot; Kathryn Kusner; Mary Mairs	See above	Team	70.75	36.25	107.00	6

== Fencing ==
18 fencers represented the United States in 1964.

Men

Athlete	Event	Round 1		Barrage		Round 2		Barrage		Round of 24	Round of 16	Quarterfinal	Semifinal	Final round		Medal barrage		Final / BM	
Athlete	Event	V – D (IV)	Rank	V – D	Rank	V – D	Rank	V – D	Rank	Opposition Result	Opposition Result	Opposition Result	Opposition Result	V – D	Rank	V – D	Rank	Opposition Result	Rank
Frank Anger	Épée	3 – 4	6	—N/a		Did not advance								—N/a				Did not advance	
David Micahnik	Épée	4 – 3	5 Q	—N/a		3 – 3	=4 B	0 – 1	2	Did not advance				—N/a				Did not advance	
Paul Pesthy	Épée	4 – 3	3 Q	—N/a		1 – 4	6	Did not advance						—N/a				Did not advance	
Frank Anger; Larry Anastasi; David Micahnik; Paul Pesthy	Team épée	1 – 1 (14)	3	—N/a							Did not advance			—N/a				Did not advance	
Albert Axelrod	Foil	3 – 2	2 Q	—N/a		4 – 1	1 Q	Bye		Tabuchi (JPN); W 10–5	Franke (POL); L 9–10	Did not advance		—N/a				Did not advance	
Herbert Cohen	Foil	2 – 3	=3 B	1 – 1	1 Q	2 – 3	=3 B	2 – 0	1 Q	Ōkawa (JPN); L 4–10	Did not advance			—N/a				Did not advance	
Ed Richards	Foil	1 – 4	5	—N/a		Did not advance								—N/a				Did not advance	
Albert Axelrod; Larry Anastasi; Herbert Cohen; Eugene Glazer; Ed Richards	Team foil	2 – 1 (22)	3	—N/a								Did not advance		—N/a				Did not advance	
Jenő Hámori	Sabre	5 – 1	2 Q	—N/a		3 – 4	5	—N/a			Did not advance		—N/a	Did not advance				—N/a	
Attila Keresztes	Sabre	4 – 1	2 Q	—N/a		3 – 4	6	—N/a			Did not advance		—N/a	Did not advance				—N/a	
Thomas Orley	Sabre	3 – 2	3 Q	—N/a		3 – 4	5	—N/a			Did not advance		—N/a	Did not advance				—N/a	
Robert Blum; Jenő Hámori; Attila Keresztes; Alfonso Morales; Thomas Orley	Team sabre	1 – 0 (9)	2 Q	—N/a								Soviet Union; L 4–9	5th-8th semifinal United Team of Germany; L 5–9	—N/a				Did not advance	

Women

Athlete	Event	Round 1		Barrage		Round 2		Round of 16	Quarterfinal	Semifinal	Final round		Medal barrage		Final / BM	
Athlete	Event	V – D (IV)	Rank	V – D	Rank	V – D	Rank	Opposition Result	Opposition Result	Opposition Result	V – D	Rank	V – D	Rank	Opposition Result	Rank
Tommy Angell	Foil	1 – 5	6	—N/a		Did not advance				—N/a	Did not advance				—N/a	
Harriet King	Foil	5 – 1	1 Q	Bye		3 – 2	1 Q	Rousselet (FRA); L 6–8	Did not advance	—N/a	Did not advance				—N/a	
Janice Romary	Foil	2 – 3	=4 B	0 – 1	2	Did not advance				—N/a	Did not advance				—N/a	
Tommy Angell; Anne Drungis; Harriet King; Denise O'Connor; Janice Romary	Team foil	0 – 2	3	—N/a					Did not advance		—N/a				Did not advance	

Qualification key: Q - Qualify to next round; B - Qualify to tiebreaker barrage

== Gymnastics ==
Women
All-around

Athlete	Event	Apparatus																Total	
Athlete	Event	Vault				Uneven bars				Balance beam				Floor exercise				Total	
Athlete	Event	C	O	Total	Rank	C	O	Total	Rank	C	O	Total	Rank	C	O	Total	Rank	Score	Rank
Kathleen Corrigan	Individual	9.400	9.300	18.700	28	8.933	9.100	18.033	54	~~8.900~~	~~9.166~~	18.066	59	~~8.966~~	~~9.066~~	18.032	59	72.831	51
Muriel Grossfeld	Individual	~~8.800~~	~~8.600~~	17.400	74	9.266	8.133	17.399	62	8.933	9.466	18.399	43	9.433	9.433	18.866	16	72.064	58
Dorothy McClements	Individual	9.400	9.466	18.866	18	9.066	9.233	18.299	42	9.000	9.233	18.233	54	9.333	9.333	18.666	25	74.064	34
Linda Metheny	Individual	9.333	8.933	18.266	56	9.400	9.300	18.700	19	9.166	9.533	18.699	22	9.133	9.200	18.333	46	73.998	36
Janie Speaks	Individual	9.233	9.200	18.433	47	~~8.533~~	8.166	16.699	69	9.066	9.300	18.366	44	9.066	9.300	18.366	43	71.864	62
Marie Walther	Individual	9.233	9.033	18.266	56	9.366	~~7.500~~	16.866	66	8.900	9.366	18.266	49	9.300	9.333	18.633	29	72.031	60
Kathleen Corrigan; Muriel Grossfeld; Dorothy McClements; Linda Metheny; Janie Speaks; Marie Walther	Team	46.599	45.932	—N/a		46.031	43.932	—N/a		45.065	46.898	—N/a		46.265	46.599	—N/a		367.321	9

== Judo ==
Athlete	Event	Pool stage			Repechage			Quarterfinal	Semifinal	Final	
Athlete	Event	Opposition Result	Opposition Result	Rank	Opposition Result	Opposition Result	Rank	Opposition Result	Opposition Result	Opposition Result	Rank
Paul Maruyama	68 kg	Reisinger (AUT); W 02–00	Schießleder (EUA); W 02–00	1 Q	—N/a			Nakatani (JPN); L 00–10	Did not advance		=5
Jim Bregman	80 kg	Goldschmied (MEX); W 10–00	Paige (AUS); W 10–00	1 Q	—N/a			Pérez (ARG); W 02–00	Hofmann (EUA); L 00–10	Did not advance	3rd place, bronze medalist(s)
George Harris	+80 kg	Sweeney (GBR); W 10–00	Chikviladze (URS); L 01–00	2	—N/a			Did not advance			=6
Ben Nighthorse Campbell	Open	Ong (PHI); W 10–00	Glahn (EUA); L 00–10	2 R	WD			—N/a	Did not advance		6

Qualification key: Q - Qualify to elimination rounds; R - Qualify to repechage round

== Modern pentathlon ==
Three pentathletes represented the United States in 1964. They won a silver medal in the team event.

Athlete	Event	Equestrian (Cross-country steeplechase)				Fencing (Épée)			Shooting (Rapid-fire pistol)			Swimming (300 m freestyle)			Running (4000 m cross-country)			Total	
Athlete	Event	Time	Penalties	Rank	MP	V–D	Rank	MP	Score	Rank	MP	Time	Rank	MP	Time	Rank	MP	MP points	Rank
David Kirkwood	Individual	3:13.7	0	6	1100	21–15	13	784	191	17	920	4:11.5	27	945	15:09.7	19	973	4722	9
James Moore	Individual	3:03.5	30	16	1070	18–18	20	676	193	12	960	4:02.4	15	990	13:55.0	2	1195	4891	6
Paul Pesthy	Individual	3:14.7	30	18	1070	22–14	7	820	183	29	760	4:04.9	18	980	15:12.1	20	964	4594	16
David Kirkwood; James Moore; Paul Pesthy	Team	—N/a			3240	—N/a		2280	—N/a		2640	—N/a		2915	—N/a		3132	14207	2nd place, silver medalist(s)

== Rowing ==
Athlete	Event	Heat		Repechage		Final	
Athlete	Event	Time	Rank	Time	Rank	Time	Rank
Donald Spero	Single sculls	7:41.94	1 FA	Bye		8:37.53	6
James Edmonds; Tony Johnson	Coxless pair	7:33.89	4 R	7:30.84	2 FB	7:15.04	10
Edward Ferry; Conn Findlay; Kent Mitchell (C)	Coxed pair	7:53.17	1 FA	Bye		8:21.33	1st place, gold medalist(s)
Seymour Cromwell; Jim Storm	Double sculls	6:31.63	1 FA	Bye		7:13.16	2nd place, silver medalist(s)
Dick Lyon; Ted Mittet; Ted Nash; Geoffrey Picard	Coxless four	6:56.40	2 R	6:38.93	1 FA	7:01.37	3rd place, bronze medalist(s)
Paul Gunderson; Hughie Pollock; Tom Pollock; Jim Tew; Ted Washburn (C)	Coxed four	6:48.19	2 R	7:12.82	2 FB	6:43.68	7
Joseph Amlong; Thomas Amlong; Boyce Budd; Emory Clark; Stanley Cwiklinski; Hugh Foley; Bill Knecht; William Stowe; Róbert Zimonyi (C)	Eight	5:54.30	2 R	6:01.47	1 FA	6:18.23	1st place, gold medalist(s)

Qualification key: FA - Qualify to medal final; FB - Qualify to non-medal final; R - Qualify to repechage

== Sailing ==
Athlete	Event	1		2		3		4		5		6		7		Total	
Athlete	Event	Rank	Points	Rank	Points	Rank	Points	Rank	Points	Rank	Points	Rank	Points	Rank	Points	Points	Rank
Peter Barrett	Finn	1	1620	3	1142	~~DNF~~	~~101~~	7	774	3	1142	5	921	7	774	6373	2nd place, silver medalist(s)
William Bentsen; Buddy Melges	Flying Dutchman	10	423	2	1122	~~DNF~~	~~101~~	2	1122	2	1122	3	946	10	423	5158	3rd place, bronze medalist(s)
Richard Stearns; Lynn Williams	Star	7	486	~~8~~	~~428~~	1	1131	2	1030	3	854	3	854	2	1030	5585	2nd place, silver medalist(s)
Richard Deaver; Lowell North; Charles Rogers	Dragon	3	986	5	764	1	1463	3	986	~~8~~	~~550~~	5	764	8	560	5523	3rd place, bronze medalist(s)
Joseph Batchelder; John J. McNamara; Francis Scully	5.5 Meter	10	277	1	1277	1	1277	6	499	2	976	3	800	~~DNF~~	~~101~~	5106	3rd place, bronze medalist(s)

== Shooting ==
Ten shooters represented the United States in 1964. Between them they won two golds, a silver and three bronze medals.

Athlete	Event	Score	Rank
Bill McMillan	25 m rapid fire pistol	586	12
Edwin Teague	25 m rapid fire pistol	583	17
Franklin Green	50 m pistol	557	2nd place, silver medalist(s)
Thomas Smith	50 m pistol	548	8
Tommy Pool	50 m rifle prone	596	3rd place, bronze medalist(s)
Lones Wigger	50 m rifle prone	597	2nd place, silver medalist(s)
Tommy Pool	50 m rifle three positions	1147	6
Lones Wigger	50 m rifle three positions	1164	1st place, gold medalist(s)
Gary Anderson	300 m rifle three positions	1153 WR	1st place, gold medalist(s)
Martin Gunnarsson	300 m rifle three positions	1136	3rd place, bronze medalist(s)
Frank Little	Trap	187	21
William Morris	Trap	194 (+24)	3rd place, bronze medalist(s)

== Swimming ==
Men

Athlete	Event	Heat		Semifinal		Final	
Athlete	Event	Time	Rank	Time	Rank	Time	Rank
Mike Austin	100 m freestyle	54.9	5 Q	54.3	=3 Q	54.5	6
Gary Ilman	100 m freestyle	54.0 OR	1 Q	53.9 OR	1 Q	54.0	4
Don Schollander	100 m freestyle	54.3	2 Q	54.0	2 Q	53.4 OR	1st place, gold medalist(s)
John Nelson	400 m freestyle	4:19.9	6 Q	—N/a		4:16.9	5
Roy Saari	400 m freestyle	4:20.0	7 Q	—N/a		4:16.7	4
Don Schollander	400 m freestyle	4:15.8	1 Q	—N/a		4:12.2 WR	1st place, gold medalist(s)
Bill Farley	1500 m freestyle	17:30.5	7 Q	—N/a		17:18.2	4
John Nelson	1500 m freestyle	17:22.4	2 Q	—N/a		17:03.0	2nd place, silver medalist(s)
Roy Saari	1500 m freestyle	17:27.0	4 Q	—N/a		17:29.2	7
Bob Bennett	200 m backstroke	2:16.1 OR	5 Q	2:16.3	8 Q	2:13.1	3rd place, bronze medalist(s)
Gary Dilley	200 m backstroke	2:14.2 OR	1 Q	2:13.8 OR	2 Q	2:10.5	2nd place, silver medalist(s)
Jed Graef	200 m backstroke	2:14.5 OR	2 Q	2:13.7 OR	1 Q	2:10.3 WR	1st place, gold medalist(s)
Wayne Anderson	200 m breaststroke	2:31.5	5 Q	2:32.6	5 Q	2:35.0	7
Chet Jastremski	200 m breaststroke	2:30.5	3 Q	2:32.1	4 Q	2:29.6	3rd place, bronze medalist(s)
Tom Trethewey	200 m breaststroke	2:33.4	7 Q	2:34.5	=11	Did not advance	
Philip Riker	200 m butterfly	2:12.6	4 Q	2:09.9	3 Q	2:11.0	4
Carl Robie	200 m butterfly	2:10.0 OR	1 Q	2:09.3 OR	1 Q	2:07.5	2nd place, silver medalist(s)
Fred Schmidt	200 m butterfly	2:13.3	7 Q	2:11.5	4 Q	2:09.3	3rd place, bronze medalist(s)
Carl Robie	400 m individual medley	4:52.0	1 Q	—N/a		4:51.4	4
Dick Roth	400 m individual medley	5:01.3	4 Q	—N/a		4:45.4 WR	1st place, gold medalist(s)
Roy Saari	400 m individual medley	5:02.3	5 Q	—N/a		4:47.1	2nd place, silver medalist(s)
Mike Austin; Steve Clark; Gary Ilman; Don Schollander; Lary Schulhof^{[b]}	4 × 100 m freestyle relay	3:38.8	1 Q	—N/a		3:33.2 WR	1st place, gold medalist(s)
Steve Clark; Gary Ilman; David Lyons^{[b]} Bill Mettler^{[b]} Roy Saari; Don Schollander; Ed Townsend^{[b]} Michael Wall^{[b]}	4 × 200 m freestyle relay	8:09.0	1 Q	—N/a		7:52.1 WR	1st place, gold medalist(s)
Bob Bennett^{[b]} Steve Clark; Bill Craig; Virgil Luken^{[b]} Thompson Mann; Richard McGeagh^{[b]} Walter Richardson^{[b]} Fred Schmidt	4 × 100 m medley relay	4:05.1 OR	1 Q	—N/a		3:58.4 WR	1st place, gold medalist(s)

Women

Athlete	Event	Heat		Semifinal		Final	
Athlete	Event	Time	Rank	Time	Rank	Time	Rank
Kathy Ellis	100 m freestyle	1:01.5	2 Q	1:02.5	8 Q	1:00.8	3rd place, bronze medalist(s)
Jeanne Hallock	100 m freestyle	1:03.6	13 Q	1:02.9	=9	Did not advance	
Sharon Stouder	100 m freestyle	1:02.3	4 Q	1:01.4	2 Q	59.9	2nd place, silver medalist(s)
Ginny Duenkel	400 m freestyle	4:48.6	2 Q	—N/a		4:43.3 OR	1st place, gold medalist(s)
Marilyn Ramenofsky	400 m freestyle	4:47.7	1 Q	—N/a		4:44.6	2nd place, silver medalist(s)
Terri Stickles	400 m freestyle	4:49.3	3 Q	—N/a		4:47.2	3rd place, bronze medalist(s)
Ginny Duenkel	100 m backstroke	1:08.9	3 Q	—N/a		1:08.0	3rd place, bronze medalist(s)
Cathy Ferguson	100 m backstroke	1:08.8	2 Q	—N/a		1:07.7 WR	1st place, gold medalist(s)
Nina Harmer	100 m backstroke	1:09.8	5 Q	—N/a		1:09.4	5
Tammy Hazleton	200 m breaststroke	2:55.0	14	—N/a		Did not advance	
Claudia Kolb	200 m breaststroke	2:49.7	5 Q	—N/a		2:47.6	2nd place, silver medalist(s)
Sandra Nitta	200 m breaststroke	2:58.4	18	—N/a		Did not advance	
Donna de Varona	100 m butterfly	1:07.5 OR	2 Q	1:07.7	4 Q	1:08.0	5
Kathy Ellis	100 m butterfly	1:07.8 OR	=3 Q	1:07.2	3 Q	1:06.0	3rd place, bronze medalist(s)
Sharon Stouder	100 m butterfly	1:07.0 OR	1 Q	1:05.6 OR	1 Q	1:04.7 WR	1st place, gold medalist(s)
Donna de Varona	400 m individual medley	5:24.2	1 Q	—N/a		5:18.7 OR	1st place, gold medalist(s)
Sharon Finneran	400 m individual medley	5:32.7	5 Q	—N/a		5:24.1	2nd place, silver medalist(s)
Martha Randall	400 m individual medley	5:27.8	3 Q	—N/a		5:24.2	3rd place, bronze medalist(s)
Lynne Allsup^{[b]} Erika Bricker^{[b]} Donna de Varona; Kathy Ellis; Jeanne Hallock^{[b]} Patience Sherman^{[b]} Sharon Stouder; Lillian Watson	4 × 100 m freestyle relay	4:12.2	2 Q	—N/a		4:03.8 WR	1st place, gold medalist(s)
Kathy Ellis; Cathy Ferguson; Cynthia Goyette; Nina Harmer^{[b]} Susan Pitt^{[b]} Judy Reeder^{[b]} Sharon Stouder; Lillian Watson^{[b]}	4 × 100 m medley relay	4:41.6	3 Q	—N/a		4:33.9 OR	1st place, gold medalist(s)

^{b} Swimmers who participated in the heat only.

== Volleyball ==
Summary

Team	Event	Round robin									
Team	Event	Opposition Result	Opposition Result	Opposition Result	Opposition Result	Opposition Result	Opposition Result	Opposition Result	Opposition Result	Opposition Result	Rank
United States men	Men's tournament	Netherlands; W 3–0	South Korea; L 3–2	Hungary; L 0–3	Czechoslovakia; L 0–3	Japan; L 1–3	Bulgaria; L 0–3	Soviet Union; L 0–3	Brazil; L 2–3	Romania; L 1–3	9
United States women	Women's tournament	Japan; L 0–3	Poland; L 0–3	Romania; L 0–3	Soviet Union; L 0–3	South Korea; W 3–0	—N/a				5

=== Men's tournament ===
Team roster

- Mike Bright
- Barry Brown
- Keith Erickson
- Bill Griebenow
- Richard Hammer
- Jacob Highland
- Ron Lang
- Charles Nelson
- Mike O'Hara
- Ernie Suwara
- John Taylor
- Pedro Velasco

- Head coach: Harry Wilson

=== Women's tournament ===
Team roster

- Jean Gaertner
- Lou Galloway
- Barbara Harwerth
- Patti Lucas-Bright
- Linda Murphy
- Gail O'Rourke
- Nancy Owen
- Mary Jo Peppler
- Mary Margaret Perry
- Sharon Peterson
- Verneda Thomas
- Jane Ward

- Head coach: Doc Burroughs

== Water polo ==
Summary

Team	Event	First round				Semifinal round				Final round / Cl.			
Team	Event	Opposition Result	Opposition Result	Opposition Result	Rank	Opposition Result	Opposition Result	Opposition Result	Rank	Opposition Result	Opposition Result	Opposition Result	Rank
United States men	Men's tournament	Yugoslavia; L 1–2	Brazil; W 7–1	Netherlands; L 4–6	3	Did not advance							

First round

Pos	Team	Pld	W	D	L	GF	GA	GD	Pts	Qualification
1	Yugoslavia	3	3	0	0	17	3	+14	6	Semifinals
2	Netherlands	3	2	0	1	11	13	−2	4	Semifinals
3	United States	3	1	0	2	12	9	+3	2	
4	Brazil	3	0	0	3	3	18	−15	0	

Source: Official Report p. 673

11 October 1964; 18:50	Official Report p.676	Yugoslavia	2–1	United States	Tokyo Metropolitan Indoor Swimming Pool; Referees: A. Fuchs (BEL)
11 October 1964; 18:50	Official Report p.676	Score by quarters: 1–1, 0–0, 0–0, 1–0			Tokyo Metropolitan Indoor Swimming Pool; Referees: A. Fuchs (BEL)
11 October 1964; 18:50	Official Report p.676	Janković, Rosić 1	Goals	Cole 1	Tokyo Metropolitan Indoor Swimming Pool; Referees: A. Fuchs (BEL)

12 October 1964; 18:50	Official Report p.679	United States	7–1	Brazil	Tokyo Metropolitan Indoor Swimming Pool; Referees: M. Natori (JPN)
12 October 1964; 18:50	Official Report p.679	Score by quarters: 1–0, 1–0, 3–0, 2–1			Tokyo Metropolitan Indoor Swimming Pool; Referees: M. Natori (JPN)
12 October 1964; 18:50	Official Report p.679	Crawford 3	Goals	Szabo 1	Tokyo Metropolitan Indoor Swimming Pool; Referees: M. Natori (JPN)

13 October 1964; 18:50	Official Report p.681	United States	4–6	Netherlands	Tokyo Metropolitan Indoor Swimming Pool; Referees: J. Dirnweber (AUT)
13 October 1964; 18:50	Official Report p.681	Score by quarters: 2–2, 0–3, 0–0, 2–1			Tokyo Metropolitan Indoor Swimming Pool; Referees: J. Dirnweber (AUT)
13 October 1964; 18:50	Official Report p.681	four players 1	Goals	W. Vriend 2	Tokyo Metropolitan Indoor Swimming Pool; Referees: J. Dirnweber (AUT)

== Weightlifting ==
Athlete	Event	Weight	Rank
Issac Berger	60 kg	382.5	2nd place, silver medalist(s)
Tony Garcy	67.5 kg	412.5	4
Gary Cleveland	82.5 kg	455.0	5
Louis Riecke	90 kg	DNF	
William March	90 kg	467.5	4
Gary Gubner	+90 kg	512.5	4
Norbert Schemansky	+90 kg	537.5	3rd place, bronze medalist(s)

== Wrestling ==
Key:

- TF – Victory by fall.
- SP - Win by technical superiority
- PP - Win by technical points
- DF - Win by default
- FO - Win by foul

Athlete	Event	Elimination stage						Final stage			
Athlete	Event	Opposition Result (Penalty points)	Opposition Result (Penalty points)	Opposition Result (Penalty points)	Opposition Result (Penalty points)	Opposition Result (Penalty points)	TPP	Opposition Result (Penalty points)	Opposition Result (Penalty points)	FPP	Rank
Gray Simons	Freestyle flyweight	Malov (BUL); W PP (1.0)	Aliyev (URS); T (2.0)	Singh (IND); W PP (1.0)	Heidari (IRN); T (2.0)	EL	6.0	—N/a	Did not advance		7
David Auble	Freestyle bantamweight	Sükhbaatar (MGL); W PP (1.0)	Leibovich (ARG); W TF (0.0)	Georgiev (BUL); W PP (1.0)	Singh (IND); W PP (1.0)	Uetake (JPN); L PP (3.0)	6.0	Did not advance			4
Bobby Douglas	Freestyle featherweight	Şahinkaya (TUR); W PP (1.0)	Patil (IND); W TF (0.0)	Jutila (CAN); W PP (1.0)	Kokhashvili (URS); L PP (3.0)	Khedri (AFG); W PP (1.0)	6.0	Did not advance			4
Gregory Ruth	Freestyle lightweight	Poikala (SWE); W PP (1.0)	Sereeter (MGL); W PP (1.0)	Horiuchi (JPN); L PP (3.0)	Marsh (AUS); W PP (1.0)	EL	6.0	—N/a	Did not advance		=6
Charles Tribble	Freestyle welterweight	Ogan (TUR); L TF (4.0)	WD				4.0	Did not advance			=21
Daniel Brand	Freestyle middleweight	van Wyk (ZAM); W TF (0.0)	Mehdizadeh (IRN); T (2.0)	Sasaki (JPN); W PP (1.0)	Faiz (PAK); W TF (0.0)	Güngör (TUR); L PP (3.0)	6.0	—N/a	Did not advance		3rd place, bronze medalist(s)
Jerry Conine	Freestyle light heavyweight	Eriksson (SWE); W PP (1.0)	Balla (ROM); T (2.0)	Bye	Jutzeler (SUI); L PP (3.0)	EL	6.0	—N/a	Did not advance		6
Larry Kristoff	Freestyle heavyweight	Dietrich (EUA); W PP (1.0)	Ivanitsky (URS); L PP (3.0)	Kaplan (TUR); T (2.0)	EL	—N/a	6.0	—N/a	Did not advance		=7
Dick Wilson	Greco-Roman flyweight	del Rio (MEX); W TF (0.0)	Bye	Sin (KOR); L PP (3.0)	Kerezov (BUL); L PP (3.0)	—N/a	6.0	Did not advance			=4
Andy Fitch	Greco-Roman bantamweight	Stange (EUA); L PP (3.0)	Noor (AFG); W PP (1.0)	Pashkulev (BUL); T (2.0)	EL		6.0	—N/a			=9
Ronald Finley	Greco-Roman featherweight	Polyák (HUN); L PP (3.0)	Jutila (CAN); W DF (0.0)	Bye	Cacas (AUS); W TF (0.0)	Martinović (YUG); L PP (3.0)	6.0	—N/a	Did not advance		=4
James Burke	Greco-Roman lightweight	Ebrahimian (IRN); T (2.0)	Ivanov (BUL); L PP (3.0)	Bularca (ROM); L FO (4.0)	EL		9.0	Did not advance			=12
Russell Camilleri	Greco-Roman welterweight	Dubicki (POL); L PP (3.0)	Längle (AUT); W PP (1.0)	Michiels (BEL); W TF (0.0)	Nyström (SWE); L PP (3.0)	EL	7.0	Did not advance			=7
R. Wayne Baughman	Greco-Roman middleweight	Andalkar (IND); W PP (1.0)	Bye	Popovici (ROM); L PP (3.0)	Olenik (URS); L PP (3.0)	EL	7.0	—N/a	Did not advance		=7
Pat Lovell	Greco-Roman light heavyweight	Svensson (SWE); L FO (4.0)	Kiehl (EUA); L TF (4.0)	EL			8.0	—N/a			=15
Bob Pickens	Greco-Roman heavyweight	Svensson (SWE); L PP (3.0)	Kangasniemi (FIN); W TF (0.0)	Kment (TCH); L TF (4.0)	EL		7.0	—N/a	Did not advance		6
