= Equestrian at the 1964 Summer Olympics – Individual dressage =

Equestrian at the Olympics

Individual dressage at the Games of the XVIII Olympiad
- Venue: Baji Koen
- Date: 22–23 October 1964
- Competitors: 22 from 9 nations

Medalists
1st place, gold medalist(s)		Henri Chammartin	Switzerland
2nd place, silver medalist(s)		Harry Boldt	United Team of Germany
3rd place, bronze medalist(s)		Sergey Filatov	Soviet Union

The individual dressage was an equestrian event held as part of the Equestrian at the 1964 Summer Olympics programme. The event was held on 22–23 October 1964.

== Results ==
All rider and horse pairs competed in the preliminary dressage, which allowed 12 minutes and 30 seconds. The top six advanced to a further 6 minutes and 30 seconds ride-off.

=== Preliminary ===
1.	Harry Boldt on Remus (EUA)	889.0	QF
2.	Henri Chammartin on Woermann (SUI)	870.0	QF
3.	Gustav Fischer on Wald (SUI)	854.0	QF
4.	Sergey Filatov on Absent (URS)	847.0	QF
5.	Reiner Klimke on Dux (EUA)	837.0	QF
6.	Josef Neckermann on Antoinette (EUA)	832.0	QF
7.	Marianne Gossweiler on Stephan (SUI)	802.0
8.	Patricia de la Tour on Path Patrick (USA)	783.0
9.	William Hamilton on Delicado (SWE)	777.0
10.	Ivan Kisimov on Ikhor (URS)	758.0
11.	Hans Wikne on Gaspari (SWE)	753.0
12.	Johanna Hall on Conversano Caprice (GBR)	743.0
13.	Francisco D'Alessandri on Vidriero (ARG)	734.0
14.	Anne Newberry on Forstrat (USA)	707.0
15.	Ivan Kalita on Moar (URS)	706.0
16.	Kikuko Inoue on Katsunobori (JPN)	648.0
17.	Karen McIntosh on Malteser (USA)	640.0
18.	Inez Fischer-Credo on Gordina (CAN)	597.0
19.	Nagahira Okabe on Seiha (JPN)	589.5
20.	Christilot Hanson on Bonheur (CAN)	549.0
21.	Yoritsune Matsudaira on Hamachidori (JPN)	542.0
22.	Bengt Ljungquist on Karat (SWE)	538.0

=== Final ===
	Henri Chammartin on Woermann (SUI)	870.0 (2nd)	+634.0 (2nd)	1504.0
	Harry Boldt on Remus (EUA)	889.0 (1st)	+614.0 (4th)	1503.0
	Sergey Filatov on Absent (URS)	847.0 (4th)	+639.0 (1st)	1486.0
4.	Gustav Fischer on Wald (SUI)	854.0 (3rd)	+631.0 (3rd)	1485.0
5.	Josef Neckermann on Antoinette (EUA)	832.0 (6th)	+597.0 (5th)	1429.0
6.	Reiner Klimke on Dux (EUA)	837.0 (5th)	+567.0 (6th)	1404.0

== Sources ==
- Tokyo Organizing Committee (1964). The Games of the XVIII Olympiad: Tokyo 1964, vol. 2.
