= Equestrian at the 1964 Summer Olympics – Team dressage =

Equestrian at the Olympics

Team dressage at the Games of the XVIII Olympiad
- Venue: Baji Koen
- Date: 22–23 October 1964
- Competitors: 18 from 6 nations
- Teams: 6
- Winning time: 2,558

Medalists
1st place, gold medalist(s)		Harry Boldt, Reiner Klimke, Josef Neckermann	United Team of Germany
2nd place, silver medalist(s)		Henri Chammartin, Gustav Fischer, Marianne Gossweiler	Switzerland
3rd place, bronze medalist(s)		Sergey Filatov, Ivan Kizimov, Ivan Kalita	Soviet Union

The team dressage was an equestrian event held as part of the Equestrian at the 1964 Summer Olympics programme. The event was held on 22–23 October 1964, and consisted merely of summing the scores of the team's 3 horse and rider pairs in the individual dressage event.

== Results ==
	Harry Boldt on Remus (EUA)	2558.0	889.0
	Reiner Klimke on Dux (EUA)	2558.0	837.0
	Josef Neckermann on Antoinette (EUA)	2558.0	832.0
	Henri Chammartin on Woermann (SUI)	2526.0	870.0
	Gustav Fischer on Wald (SUI)	2526.0	854.0
	Marianne Gossweiler on Stephan (SUI)	2526.0	802.0
	Sergey Filatov on Absent (URS)	2311.0	847.0
	Ivan Kizimov on Ikhor (URS)	2311.0	758.0
	Ivan Kalita on Mora (URS)	2311.0	706.0
4.	Patricia de la Tour on Rath Patrick (USA)	2130.0	783.0
4.	Anne Newberry on Forstrat (USA)	2130.0	707.0
4.	Karen McIntosh on Malteser (USA)	2130.0	640.0
5.	William Hamilton on Delicado (SWE)	2068.0	777.0
5.	Hans Wikne on Gaspari (SWE)	2068.0	753.0
5.	Bengt Ljungquist on Karat (SWE)	2068.0	538.0
6.	Inoue Kikuo on Katsunobori (JPN)	1779.5	648.0
6.	Okabe Nagahira on Seiha (JPN)	1779.5	589.5
6.	Matsudira Yorisuke on Hamachidori (JPN)	1779.5	542.0

== Sources ==
- Tokyo Organizing Committee (1964). The Games of the XVIII Olympiad: Tokyo 1964, vol. 2.
