= Equestrian at the 1960 Summer Olympics – Individual dressage =

Equestrian at the Olympics

Individual dressage at the Games of the XVII Olympiad
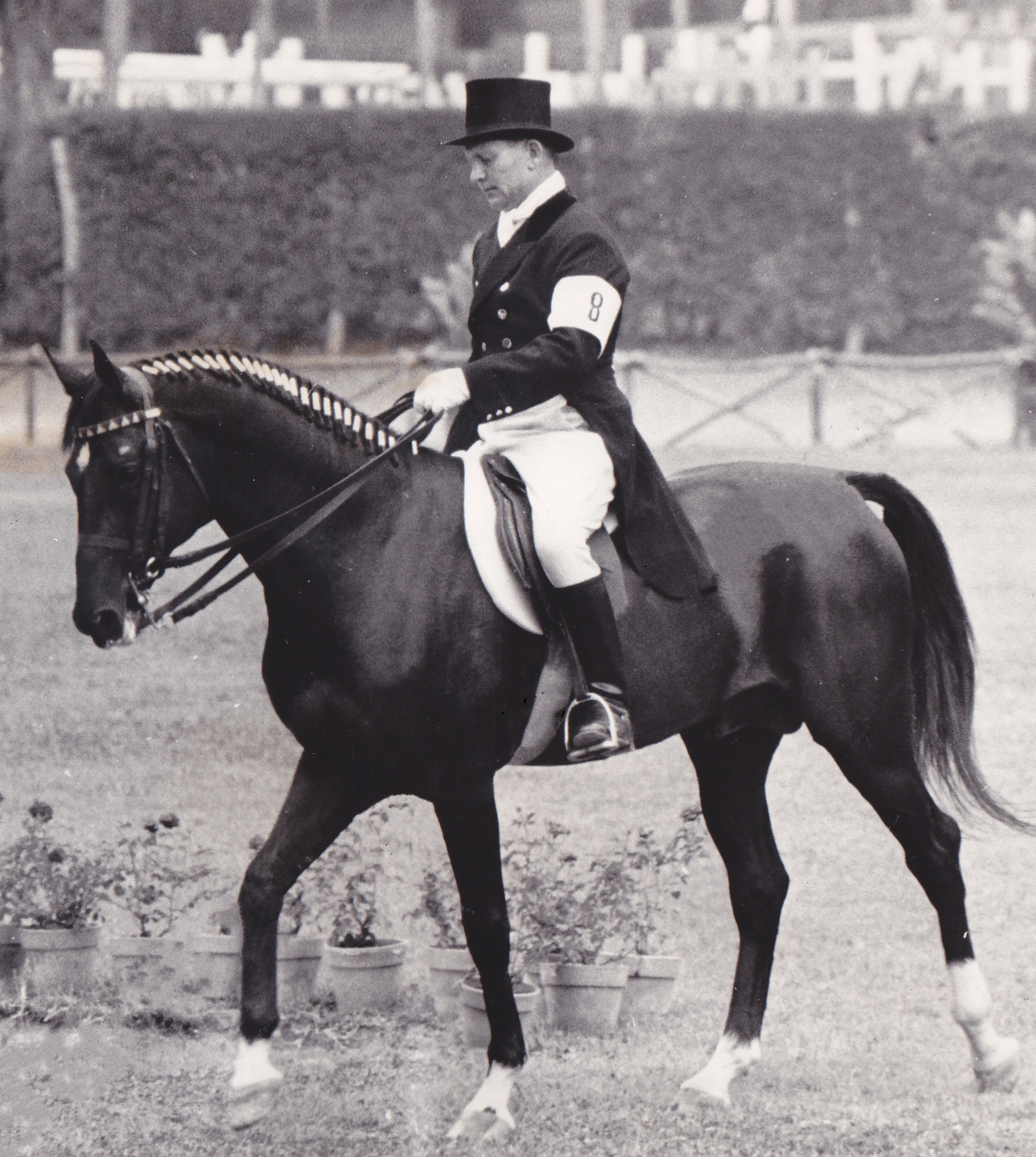
- Sergei Filatov and Absent
- Venue: Villa Borghese gardens
- Date: 5–6 September 1960
- Competitors: 17 from 10 nations

Medalists
| 1st place, gold medalist(s) | | Sergei Filatov | Soviet Union |
| 2nd place, silver medalist(s) | | Gustav Fischer | Switzerland |
| 3rd place, bronze medalist(s) | | Josef Neckermann | United Team of Germany |

The individual dressage at the 1960 Summer Olympics took place between 5 and 6 September, at the Villa Borghese gardens. The event was open to men and women.

== Background ==
The 1956 Olympics created some serious changes for the dressage competition at the 1960 Games. The previous Games had resulted in a serious judging scandal after the German and Swedish judges favored their own countrymen. These two judges were subsequently suspended by the FEI. Following this controversy, the IOC threatened to remove dressage from the Olympics, but the FEI managed to come to a compromise, removing the team competition from the 1960 Games and only allowing individual competitors (up to 2 per country). Additionally, 3 of the judges had to be from non-participating countries, and ride-offs were filmed and reviewed for a day before the final results were announced publicly.

The other major change was in the scoring scale, which moved from a scale of 0–6 to 0–10.

17 riders competed, from 10 nations. Despite the small number of riders, the competition still took a long time as the judges, conscious of not playing favoritism, conferred for up to 20 minutes following each ride. 5 riders total qualified for the ride-off (2 from the Soviet Union, and 1 each from Switzerland, Germany, and Sweden). The ride-off was filmed and reviewed, the judging panel decided not to change the original placings, and the results were announced to the public 3 days following the ride.

== Competition format ==
Three judges gave scores. Each judge gave a score between 0 and 10 for each test. The competition was held over two rounds; the top 5 horse and rider pairs in the first round advanced to the second round. The total score for both rounds determined final ranking.

== Results ==
17 riders competed.

| Rank | Rider | Nation | Horse | Round 1 | | Round 2 | | Total |
| Rank | Rider | Nation | Horse | Score | Rank | Score | Rank | Total |
|---|---|---|---|---|---|---|---|---|
| 1st place, gold medalist(s) | Sergei Filatov | Soviet Union | Absent | 1074 | 1 | 1070 | 1 | 2144 |
| 2nd place, silver medalist(s) | Gustav Fischer | Switzerland | Wald | 1052 | 3 | 1035 | 2 | 2087 |
| 3rd place, bronze medalist(s) | Josef Neckermann | United Team of Germany | Asbach | 1071 | 2 | 1011 | 4 | 2082 |
| 4 | Henri Saint Cyr | Sweden | L'Etoile | 1036 | 4 | 1028 | 3 | 2064 |
| 5 | Ivan Kalita | Soviet Union | Korbey | 1010 | 5 | 997 | 5 | 2007 |
| 6 | Patricia Galvin | United States | Rathpatrick | 995 | 6 | did not advance | | |
| 7 | Rosemarie Springer | United Team of Germany | Doublette | 985 | 7 | did not advance | | |
| 8 | Henri Chammartin | Switzerland | Wolfdietrich | 978 | 8 | did not advance | | |
| 9 | Yngve Viebke | Sweden | Gaspari | 975 | 9 | did not advance | | |
| 10 | António, Viscount de Mozelos | Portugal | Greek Warrior | 948 | 10 | did not advance | | |
| 11 | Lilian Williams | Great Britain | Little Model | 939 | 11 | did not advance | | |
| 12 | Jessica Newberry-Ransehousen | United States | Forstrat | 927 | 12 | did not advance | | |
| 13 | Johanna Hall | Great Britain | Conversano Caprice | 838 | 13 | did not advance | | |
| 14 | František Šembera | Czechoslovakia | Ivo | 832 | 14 | did not advance | | |
| 15 | Jorge Cavoti | Argentina | Vidriero | 828 | 15 | did not advance | | |
| 16 | Krum Lekarski | Bulgaria | Edgard | 799 | 16 | did not advance | | |
| 17 | Luís Silva | Portugal | Adonis | 775 | 17 | did not advance | | |
