= Diving at the 1964 Summer Olympics – Men's 10 metre platform =

Men's 10 metre platform at the Games of the XVIII Olympiad

Medalists
1st place, gold medalist(s)		Bob Webster	United States
2nd place, silver medalist(s)		Klaus Dibiasi	Italy
3rd place, bronze medalist(s)		Tom Gompf	United States

The men's 10 metre platform, also reported as high diving, was one of four diving events on the Diving at the 1964 Summer Olympics programme.

The competition was split into two phases:

1. Preliminary round (16–17 October)
  Divers performed six compulsory dives with limited degrees of difficulty and one voluntary dive without limits. The eight divers with the highest scores advanced to the final.
2. Final (18 October)
  Divers performed three voluntary dives without limit of degrees of difficulty. The final ranking was determined by the combined score with the preliminary round.

== Results ==
Rank	Diver	Nation	Preliminary		Final		
Rank	Diver	Nation	Points	Rank	Points	Rank	Total
1st place, gold medalist(s)	Bob Webster	United States	93.18	6	55.40	1	148.58
2nd place, silver medalist(s)	Klaus Dibiasi	Italy	97.62	1	49.92	5	147.54
3rd place, bronze medalist(s)	Tom Gompf	United States	92.79	7	53.78	2	146.57
4	Roberto Madrigal	Mexico	93.82	5	50.45	3	144.27
5	Viktor Palagin	Soviet Union	94.77	2	49.00	7	143.77
6	Brian Phelps	Great Britain	93.85	4	49.33	6	143.18
7	Rolf Sperling	United Team of Germany	92.24	8	50.00	4	142.24
8	Toshio Otsubo	Japan	94.32	3	47.73	8	142.05
9	Gerd Völker	United Team of Germany	91.62	9	Did not advance		
10	Luis Niño	Mexico	91.46	10	Did not advance		
11	Shunsuke Kaneto	Japan	91.31	11	Did not advance		
12	Igor Lobanov	Soviet Union	91.22	12	Did not advance		
13	Viktor Pogozhev	Soviet Union	90.73	13	Did not advance		
14	Yosuke Arimitsu	Japan	90.56	14	Did not advance		
15	Klaus Konzorr	United Team of Germany	90.08	15	Did not advance		
16	Anthony Kitcher	Great Britain	89.95	16	Did not advance		
17	Kurt Mrkwicka	Austria	89.10	17	Did not advance		
18	Alvaro Gaxiola	Mexico	87.07	18	Did not advance		
19	Louis Vitucci	United States	86.40	19	Did not advance		
20	Søren Svejstrup	Denmark	85.36	20	Did not advance		
21	Dóra József	Hungary	84.62	21	Did not advance		
22	Jo Chang-je	South Korea	84.02	22	Did not advance		
23	Franco Cagnotto	Italy	83.23	23	Did not advance		
24	Thomas Dinsley	Canada	83.22	24	Did not advance		
25	William Wood	Great Britain	81.82	25	Did not advance		
26	Song Jae-Ung	South Korea	81.72	26	Did not advance		
27	Jerry Anderson	Puerto Rico	79.54	27	Did not advance		
28	Terry Rossiter	Rhodesia	79.23	28	Did not advance		
29	Diego Henao	Colombia	76.91	29	Did not advance		
30	Sohan Singh	India	74.18	30	Did not advance		
-	Göran Lundqvist	Sweden	DNS	-	Did not advance		

== Sources ==
- The Organising Committee for The Games of the XVIII Olympiad (October 1966). The Official Report of The Games of the XVIII Olympiad Tokyo 1964, Volume II (PDF). Tokyo: The Organising Committee for The Games of the XVIII Olympiad. pp. p.550. Archived from the original (pdf) on 13 August 2011.
- Herman de Wael (26 January 2001). "Diving - men's platform (Tokyo 1964)".
