= Diving at the 1964 Summer Olympics – Men's 3 metre springboard =

Men's 3 metre springboard at the Games of the XVIII Olympiad

Medalists
1st place, gold medalist(s)		Kenneth Sitzberger	United States
2nd place, silver medalist(s)		Frank Gorman	United States
3rd place, bronze medalist(s)		Lawrence Andreasen	United States

The men's 3 metre springboard, also reported as springboard diving, was one of four diving events on the Diving at the 1964 Summer Olympics program.

The competition was split into two phases:

1. Preliminary round (12–13 October)
  Divers performed five compulsory dives with limited degrees of difficulty and two voluntary dives without limits. The eight divers with the highest scores advanced to the final.
2. Final (14 October)
  Divers performed three voluntary dives without limit of degrees of difficulty. The final ranking was determined by the combined score with the preliminary round.

== Results ==
Rank	Diver	Nation	Preliminary		Final		
Rank	Diver	Nation	Points	Rank	Points	Rank	Total
1st place, gold medalist(s)	Kenneth Sitzberger	United States	98.66	3	61.24	1	159.90
2nd place, silver medalist(s)	Frank Gorman	United States	105.99	1	51.64	2	157.63
3rd place, bronze medalist(s)	Lawrence Andreasen	United States	100.31	2	43.46	6	143.77
4	Hans-Dieter Pophal	United Team of Germany	91.16	8	51.42	3	142.58
5	Göran Lundqvist	Sweden	91.77	6	46.88	4	138.65
6	Boris Poluliakhi	Soviet Union	92.94	5	45.70	5	138.64
7	Mikhail Safonov	Soviet Union	94.06	4	39.94	8	134.00
8	Vladimir Vasin	Soviet Union	91.24	7	42.24	7	133.48
9	John Candler	Great Britain	90.69	9	did not advance		
10	Franco Cagnotto	Italy	89.54	10	did not advance		
11	Tadao Tosa	Japan	89.10	11	did not advance		
12	Luis Niño	Mexico	87.87	12	did not advance		
13	Klaus Dibiasi	Italy	87.68	13	did not advance		
14	Rolf Sperling	United Team of Germany	86.98	14	did not advance		
15	Alvaro Gaxiola	Mexico	85.78	15	did not advance		
16	Kurt Mrkwicka	Austria	85.72	16	did not advance		
17	Horst Rosenfeldt	United Team of Germany	85.66	17	did not advance		
18	Thomas Dinsley	Canada	83.02	18	did not advance		
19	Jose Robinson	Mexico	82.42	19	did not advance		
20	Pentti Koskinen	Finland	82.00	20	did not advance		
21	Toshio Yamano	Japan	81.74	20	did not advance		
22	Jerry Anderson	Puerto Rico	81.07	22	did not advance		
23	Song Jae-ung	South Korea	75.10	23	did not advance		
24	Shunsuke Kaneto	Japan	71.59	24	did not advance		
25	Ansuya Prasad	India	69.04	25	did not advance		
26	Manucher Fasihi	Iran	67.20	26	did not advance		
27	Terry Rossiter	Rhodesia	61.06	27	did not advance		

== Sources ==
- The Organising Committee for The Games of the XVIII Olympiad (October 1966). The Official Report of The Games of the XVIII Olympiad Tokyo 1964, Volume II (PDF). Tokyo: The Organising Committee for The Games of the XVIII Olympiad. pp. p.549. Archived from the original (pdf) on 13 August 2011.
- Herman de Wael (24 May 2001). "Diving - men's springboard (Tokyo 1964)".
