= Gompf =

Gompf is a surname. Notable people with the surname include:

- Robert Gompf, American mathematician
- Tom Gompf (born 1939), American diver
