= Linda Cooper =

Linda Cooper may refer to:

- Linda Cooper (politician), Auckland councillor
- Linda Cooper (diver) (born 1944), American Olympic platform diver
