= Sohan Singh (disambiguation) =

Sohan Singh Bhakna is an Indian revolutionary. Other people with this name include:

- Sohan Singh Dhanoa (born 1930), Indian middle-distance runner
- Sohan Singh (diver) (born 1936), Indian diver
