= Dick Smith (diver) =

American diver

Dick A. Smith

Biographical details
- Born: January 17, 1917; Wichita, Kansas
- Died: January 2, 2006 (aged 88); Phoenix, Arizona
- Education: University of Southern California BS, MS

Playing career
- 1935-1939: University of Southern California; Coach Fred Cady
- Position: Diver

Coaching career (HC unless noted)
- 1950-1954: University of Southern California; Diving Coach
- 1954-: Dick Smith Swim Gym, Phoenix
- 1959-1969: Arizona State University
- 1969-1974: U.S. Air Force
- 1975-1987: The Woodlands Athletic Center
- 1964, 1968: U.S. Olympic Team

Accomplishments and honors

Awards
- Fred Cady Award 1971; Sammy Lee Award 1991

Dick A. Smith (January 17, 1917 - January 2, 2006) was an American diver and a Hall of Fame diving coach and instructor who competed for the University of Southern California and coached the United States Air Force; Arizona State University in Tempe, Arizona, the Dick Smith Swim Gym in Phoenix, Arizona; and The Woodlands Aquatics Center in Houston, Texas. He was an Olympic dive coach for the 1964 Tokyo Olympics where four of his divers, Patsy Willard, Jeanne Collier, Tom Gompf, and Lesley Bush received diving medals. He coached the U.S. Olympic team again in the 1968 Mexico City Olympics, where two of his divers, Bernard Wrightson, and Edwin Young received medals. He was an Olympic coach for New Zealand in 1976, for the U.S. Air Force in 1972, and for Egypt, Finland and New Zealand in 1984.

Smith was born in Wichita, Kansas on January 17, 1917, to Marion and Edna Knierham Smith and graduated from Phoenix Union High School. He learned to swim at the Riverside Park Pool in Phoenix, and secretly continued to practice diving despite being forbidden to by his mother Edna after damaging a vertebra at age 13. The injury occurred when Smith dove from a 48-foot tower and struck a rocky bottom, suffering a concussion, fracturing his neck and causing a four-month paralysis from the waist down. After taking time to heal, Smith snuck away to a local pool, and slowly taught himself to swim again by progressing gradually with short distances. His family learned of his secretive rehabilitation program and progress three years later when at 16 he won both the Junior and Senior springboard titles in the Arizona State Championships.

== University of Southern California ==
Smith attended the University of Southern California where he received an athletic scholarship to train and compete on their Swimming and Diving Team. In addition to his diving scholarship, he earned extra money wrangling horses, continuing to ride as an avocation in later life. He was a Pacific Coast AAU and Intercollegiate Diving Champion at USC under the late Coach Fred Cady. Cady coached the U.S. Olympic diving team from 1928 to 1948. As an amateur, Smith was an Arizona AAU Champion.

He graduated USC with a BS in Education focusing on physical education. His undergraduate majors included Biological Science, Speech and Corrective Physical Education. His master's degree at USC in education focused on Remedial Physical Education and included credentials for California General Administrator. He married Helen F. Johnson in 1941.

== Coaching and teaching ==
After completing his academic studies, Smith began his career in physical education by returning to his alma mater, University of Southern California, where he taught students. He later taught and coached swimming at Lodi Union High School in Lodi, CA. He also served as a Sergeant in the United States Air Force, where he trained new soldiers in physical fitness. One of his fist assignments was at Santa Ana Army Air Base, located approximately thirty miles southeast of Los Angeles near his former USC campus. Between 1945 and 1950, Smith was a diver and helped manage the Buster Crabbe Aqua Parade, an entertainment group that employed just over 100 people and performed in the U.S. and Canada, as well as parts of Europe. He later joined the Los Angeles County Board of Education to teach physical education.

From 1950 to 1954, Smith returned to University of Southern California in Los Angeles, where he served as the Head Swimming and Diving Coach and in Physical Education as an Assistant manager.

In 1954, Smith started and opened the Dick Smith Swim Gym on 20th Street and Campbell in Phoenix, Arizona. The facility offered a range of physical education programs, including diving, swimming, and gymnastics, and competitive training in both diving and swimming.

Smith taught students to dive and was the Chief coach for Diving at Arizona State University for ten years roughly from about 1959–1969. At the height of his achievement as a diving coach between 1964 and 1968, nearly half the 32 U.S. Olympic diving team openings were taken by divers that Smith had formerly trained. From 1969 to 1973, he served as a professor of Physical Education and coached diving at the U.S. Air Force Academy in Colorado. He moved to Williams Air Force Base near Chandler, Arizona in 1974 where he managed Athletics. After coaching the host New Zealand team at the Commonwealth Games in Christchurch on January 20, 1974, he was one of only nine passengers to survive the Pan Am Flight 806 crash off Pago Pago in American Samoa by diving off a wing after an engine caught fire.

From 1975 to 1985, Smith managed the Athletic and Swimming facility in The Woodlands, outside Houston, Texas. In 1985, Coach Terry Faulkenberry took over the accomplished program. While at the Woodlands, Smith developed one of the top diving facilities in the U.S., which served as a frequent host to high level competitions in the diving and swimming. Keith Russell was one of Smith's top divers at the Woodlands as well as Olympic diver from Brazil Milton Braga, who later coached diving at the Woodlands for two years.

Continuing to serve the swimming and diving community, he served as a chief executive officer of the World Diving Coaches Association from 1976 to 2006, and previously had worked as a president of the American Coaches Association.

=== Diving philosophy ===
Smith instructed the divers he coached, and those he judged that each dive should be a beautiful flow, a smooth blending of fast actions into a single fluid movement that displayed both elegance and grace. Similar to Hall of Fame swim and dive Coach Mike Peppe of Ohio State, Smith insisted that each of his divers maintain a continuing respect for diving fundamentals. To clean up sloppy board work, he had his divers practice the very simple front jump. He would sometimes put on a face mask and carry lead weights so he could go underwater to ensure his divers were really stretching for the bottom, rather than contorting their upper body underwater to make the appearance of the entry of their legs and feet look smoother.

=== Air Force service ===
Smith first received his officer's commission as a Lieutenant in the U.S. Air Force after completing Officer training school in Miami in June, 1943. He served as a lieutenant colonel in Europe in the US Air Force in World War II, later serving brief stints in Korea and Viet Nam. Retired from the U.S. Air Force after 20 years in reserve and active duty as a Colonel in 1973, he earned a Bronze Star for meritorious service. He received the Commendation Medal and in 1978 was awarded the Franco-Britainnic War Medal for contributions made during WW II in Britain and France.

== Outstanding divers coached ==
His more outstanding divers included 1968 Olympic Gold medalist in the 3-meter springboard, Bernard "Bernie" Wrightson of ASU, 1964 Olympic silver medalist in springboard diving, Jeanne Collier, 1964 Olympic Gold medalist in platform diving Lesley Bush, 1964 Olympic bronze medalist Patsy Willard, and 1964 Olympic participant Keith Russell. Smith also coached 1968 Olympic Bronze medalist in diving Tom Gompf, while Gompf was a pilot at Williams Air Force Base. When he was ten years old, Steve McFarland, a University of Miami competitor, coach, and television commentator swam for Smith at the Dick Smith Swim School.

Smith retired from coaching in 1987. He lived in Scottsdale, Arizona, less than 15 miles Northeast of Phoenix, for fifty years from 1956 til his death in 2006.

Smith authored "Inside Diving", from Regionary Press and numerous articles covering physical education and diving.

He died of pneumonia at the age of 88 on January 2, 2006, in Phoenix, Arizona. A funeral service was held on January 5, at the Church of Jesus Christ of Latter Day Saints in Phoenix. He had no children, but was predeceased by his wife Helen, who died on November 29, 2004. He was buried with his wife Helen in Phoenix in Section 52 at the National Memorial Cemetery of Arizona.

=== Honors ===
In 1979, Smith was inducted into the International Swimming Hall of Fame in Fort Lauderdale. In 1971, he received the Fred Cady Award for his contributions to diving coaching. In 1991, he was awarded the Sammy Lee Award. In 1963, he was named the American Swimming Coaches Association (ASCA) Swim Coach of the Year. The natatorium at The Woodlands in Houston is named The Dick Smith Natatorium in his honor. In 1977, he was presented with the ‘‘Grand Prix Humanitaire de France’’ for his contributions to humanitarian efforts.
