= María Teresa Adames =

Mexican diver

Personal information
- Born: 10 September 1941 (age 84) Mexico City, Mexico
- Height: 1.60 m (5 ft 3 in)
- Weight: 52 kg (115 lb)

Sport
- Sport: Diving
Medal record
Women's diving
Representing Mexico
Pan American Games
Bronze medal – third place	1963 São Paulo	10 m platform

María Teresa Adames (born 10 September 1941) is a Mexican diver. She competed in the 1960 Summer Olympics.
