= Ansuya Prasad =

Indian diver

Personal information
- Nationality: Indian
- Born: 17 August 1936 (age 89)

Sport
- Sport: Diving

Ansuya Prasad (born 17 August 1936) is an Indian diver. He competed in the men's 3 metre springboard event at the 1964 Summer Olympics.
