= Diving at the 1963 Pan American Games =

This page shows the results of the Diving Competition for men and women at the 1963 Pan American Games, held from April 20 to May 5, 1963 in São Paulo, Brazil. There were two events, for both men and women.

== Medal table ==
Place	Nation	Gold medal	Silver medal	Bronze medal	Total
1	United States	3	2	2	7
2	Canada	1	1	0	2
3	Mexico	0	1	2	3
Total		4	4	4	12

== Medalists ==
=== Men ===
Event	Gold	Silver	Bronze
3m springboard	Thomas Dinsley; Canada	Richard Gilbert; United States	Ken Sitzberger; United States
10m platform	Bob Webster; United States	Alvaro Gaxiola; Mexico	Ricardo Capilla; Mexico

=== Women ===
Event	Gold	Silver	Bronze
3m springboard	Barbara McAlister; United States	Judy Stewart; Canada	Patsy Willard; United States
10m platform	Linda Cooper; United States	Nancy Poulsen; United States	María Adames; Mexico

== See also ==
- Diving at the 1964 Summer Olympics
