= Francisco D'Alessandri =

Argentine equestrian (1930–2018)

Personal information
- Full name: Francisco Obdulio D'Alessandri
- Nationality: Argentine
- Born: 21 June 1930
- Died: 7 April 2018 (aged 87)
- Height: 172 cm (5 ft 8 in)
- Weight: 70 kg (154 lb)

Sport
- Sport: Equestrian
Medal record
Equestrian
Representing Argentina
Pan American Games
Silver medal – second place	1963 São Paulo	Individual dressage

Francisco Obdulio D'Alessandri (21 June 1930 – 7 April 2018) was an Argentine equestrian. He competed in the individual dressage event at the 1964 Summer Olympics. D'Alessandri died on 7 April 2018, at the age of 87.
