= Viktor Palagin =

Soviet diver

Personal information
- Nationality: Soviet
- Born: 12 June 1945
- Died: 13 September 2011 (aged 66)

Sport
- Sport: Diving

Viktor Palagin (12 June 1945 – 13 September 2011) was a Soviet diver. He competed in the men's 10 metre platform event at the 1964 Summer Olympics, coming in second place during the qualifying round, and in fifth place in the finals.
