= František Šembera =

Czech equestrian

Personal information
- Nationality: Czech
- Born: 1 September 1904; České Budějovice, Austria-Hungary
- Died: 3 August 1986 (aged 81); Vienna

Sport
- Country: Czechoslovakia
- Sport: Equestrian

František Šembera (1 September 1904 – 3 August 1986) was a Czech equestrian. He competed for Czechoslovakia in the individual dressage event at the 1960 Summer Olympics.
