= Igor Lobanov (diver) =

Soviet diver (born 1946)

Personal information
- Nationality: Soviet
- Born: 14 September 1946
- Died: 2006 (aged 59–60)

Sport
- Sport: Diving
Medal record
Men's diving
Representing Soviet Union
Summer Universiade
Bronze medal – third place	1970 Turin	3 m springboard

Igor Lobanov (14 September 1946 – 2006) was a Soviet diver. He competed in the men's 10 metre platform event at the 1964 Summer Olympics.
