= Diving at the 1964 Summer Olympics =

Coordinates: 35.6678°N 139.7003°E

Diving at the Games of the XVIII Olympiad
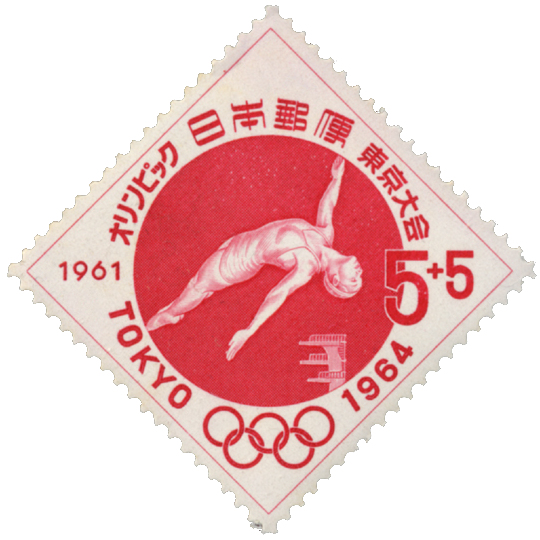
- Diving at the 1964 Olympics on a stamp of Japan
- Venue: Yoyogi National Gymnasium
- Dates: October 11, 1964 through October 18, 1964
- No. of events: 4
- Competitors: 80 from 20 nations

At the 1964 Summer Olympics in Tokyo, four diving events were contested during a competition that took place at the Yoyogi National Gymnasium, from 11 to 18 October, comprising 80 divers from 20 nations.

== Medal summary ==
The events are named according to the International Olympic Committee labelling, but they appeared on the official report as "springboard diving" and "high diving", respectively.

=== Men ===
Event	Gold	Silver	Bronze
3 m springboard	Kenneth Sitzberger; United States	Frank Gorman; United States	Lawrence Andreasen; United States
10 m platform	Bob Webster; United States	Klaus Dibiasi; Italy	Tom Gompf; United States

=== Women ===
Event	Gold	Silver	Bronze
3 m springboard	Ingrid Krämer; United Team of Germany	Jeanne Collier; United States	Patsy Willard; United States
10 m platform	Lesley Bush; United States	Ingrid Krämer; United Team of Germany	Galina Alekseyeva; Soviet Union

== Medal table ==
Rank	Nation	Gold	Silver	Bronze	Total
1	United States	3	2	3	8
2	United Team of Germany	1	1	0	2
3	Italy	0	1	0	1
4	Soviet Union	0	0	1	1
Totals (4 entries)		4	4	4	12

== Participating nations ==
Here are listed the nations that were represented in the diving events and, in brackets, the number of national competitors.

- Australia (2)
- Austria (4)
- Canada (3)
- Colombia (1)
- Denmark (2)
- Egypt (1)
- Finland (1)
- Great Britain (6)
- Hungary (2)
- India (2)
- Iran (1)
- Italy (3)
- Japan (9)
- Mexico (3)
- Puerto Rico (1)
- Rhodesia (3)
- South Korea (3)
- Soviet Union (12)
- Sweden (2)
- United States (12)
- United Team of Germany (9)

== See also ==
- Diving at the 1963 Pan American Games
