= Barbara McAlister (diver) =

American diver

Barbara Talmage
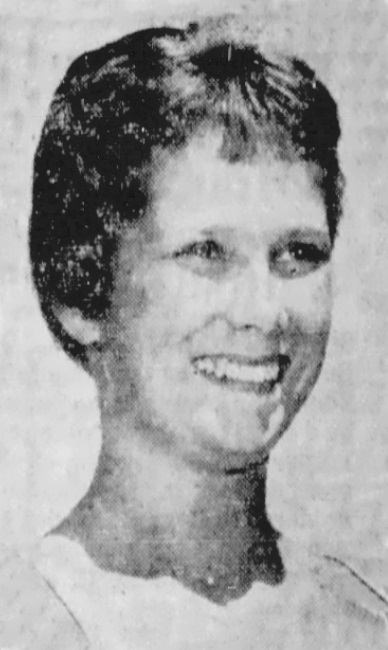
- McAlister in 1962

Personal information
- Full name: Barbara Ellen Talmage
- Born: Barbara Ellen McAlister; May 20, 1941 (age 85) Fullerton, California, U.S.
- Height: 5 ft 3 in (161 cm)
- Weight: 115 lb (52 kg)
- Spouse: Donald Talmage (m. 1963)
Medal record
Women's diving
Representing the United States
Pan American Games
Gold medal – first place	1963 São Paulo	3m springboard

Barbara Ellen Talmage (née McAlister; born May 20, 1941) is an American diver. She won a gold medal in springboard diving at the 1963 Pan American Games in São Paulo and competed at the 1964 Summer Olympics and the 1968 Summer Olympics.

== Early life ==
McAlister was born Barbara Ellen McAlister on May 20, 1941. In 1957 and 1958, she was a student at Fresno's Roosevelt High School, where as a sophomore, she won the California Interscholastic Federation crown. She later graduated from Anaheim High School in 1959. She was a student at Los Angeles City College and later Arizona State University, where her father William McAlister was a swimming coach, having previously been a swimming coach for high schools in Placentia and Fullerton.

== Career ==
In the late 1950s, she began training under Glenn McCormick, husband of Olympic gold medalist Pat McCormick. She won the women's event at the 1958 San Joaquin Valley Swimming and Diving Championships. The same year, while competing in the national indoor championships in Dallas, Texas, she placed 12th in each of the 1-meter and 3-meter springboards events respectively. She began diving from the 5-meter platform in 1960 and had progressed to diving from the 10-meter tower by the following year. She admitted to having a fear of heights and noted she would "shake all over" and would try to take her mind away from the height by concentrating "on the mechanics of the dives".

Having been on the reserve list for the 1960 Summer Olympics, in 1961 she was the United States platform diving champion and represented America during the national swimming and diving championships held in Japan during July 1962. During the women's open springboard championships in April 1962, she won the 3-metre event, scoring consistently and eventually building a 10-point lead over closest competitor Patsy Willard. She was featured on the cover of the magazine Sports Illustrated July 23, 1962 (Volume 17, Issue 4). In March 1963, she won the 3-metre title during the women's national amateur athletic union indoor swimming meet, while finishing runner-up on the 1-metre event. She won a gold medal in the 3-meter springboard diving event at the 1963 Pan American Games in São Paulo

In 1964, she considered herself to be "the best diving shape I've ever been in". In the 1964 Indoor Nationals, she won the 1 meter and 3 meter titles, as well as achieving first place on the platform. She was coached by Dick Smith, who commented that she was "an excellent diver and had fine quality when she came to me", noting that prior to his involvement, her father had been involved in her coaching. Smith observed in her personality that when he took on responsibility for her coaching, that she needed to make big changes to her attitude and diving personality. Smith further expressed his need to prove himself to Talmage to gain her trust and confidence, but that following personal adjustments on both sides, they learned to work very well with each other, describing her as "one of the truly great women divers in the U.S.".

Talmage won the 1964 Amateur Athletic Union Swimming Championship platform diving event with a points tally of 307.10, having previously won titles on the 1-meter and 3-meter. It was also the first time that the platform event was held indoors. Commenting on her performance, coach Dick Smith said "it is probably the first time any diver has been able to place that high". While participating in the 1964 Tokyo Olympic games during October, her expenses of $200 were paid for the Independent Order of Foresters. Despite retiring in 1964, she made a comeback to participate in the 1968 Mexico Olympics, where she was made captain of the American women's diving team. She finished 7th in the platform event.

== Personal ==
Her father, Bill McAlister, was a long-term diving coach at the Fresno Swim Club. Her mother was Carol Nelson McAlister (1914–2003), an accomplished violinist and she had four brothers.

Talmage lived in Phoenix, Arizona with her husband Donald, whom she married in May 1963 in Madera, California. She gave birth to a son, Todd, around 1965.
