= Gerd Völker =

German diver (1942–2025)

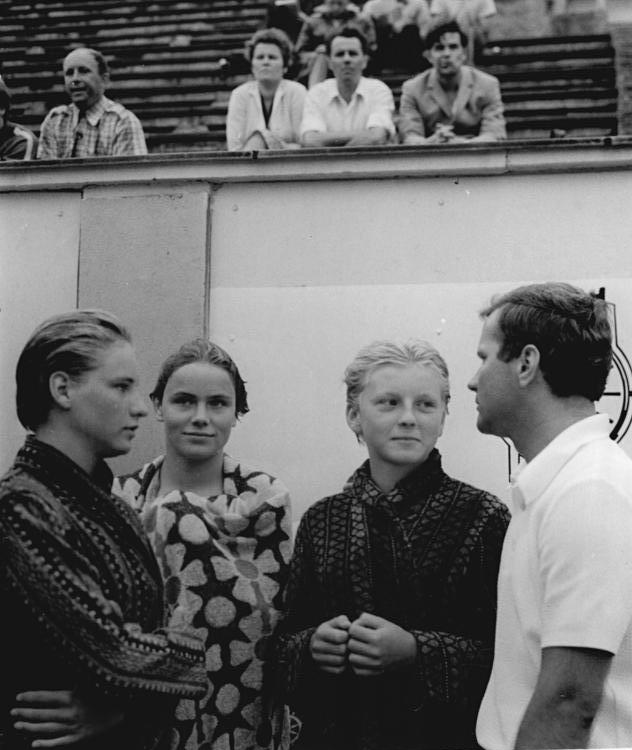
- Gerd Völker (first from right) in 1969

Personal information
- Nationality: German
- Born: 26 June 1942 Berlin, Germany
- Died: 2 September 2025 (aged 83)

Sport
- Sport: Diving

Gerd Völker (26 June 1942 – 2 September 2025) was a German diver. He competed in the men's 10 metre platform event at the 1964 Summer Olympics.

Völker died on 2 September 2025, at the age of 83.
