= Kenneth Sitzberger =

American diver (1945–1984)

Ken Sitzberger
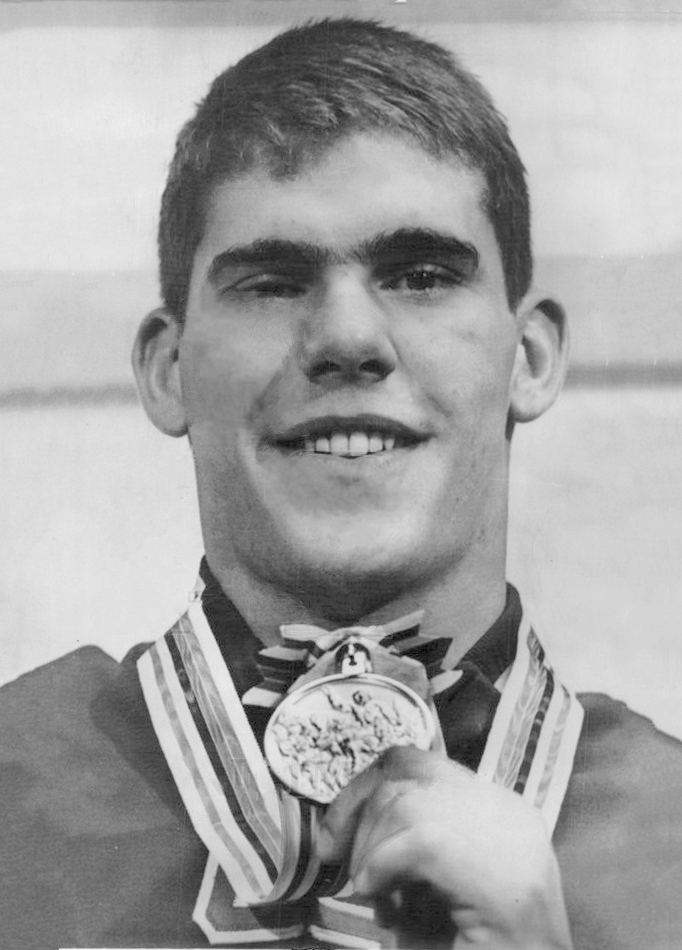
- Sitzberger at the 1964 Olympics

Personal information
- Full name: Kenneth Robert Sitzberger
- Born: February 13, 1945 Cedar Rapids, Iowa, U.S.
- Died: January 2, 1984 (aged 38) Coronado, California, U.S.
- Height: 5 ft 10 in (1.77 m)
- Weight: 154 lb (70 kg)
- Spouses: Jeanne Collier, 1966
- Children: 3 daughters

Sport
- Sport: Diving
- College team: Indiana University
- Club: Indiana Hoosiers
- Coached by: Jerry Darda (High School); Hobie Billingsley (Indiana)
Medal record
Men's diving
Representing the United States
Olympic Games
Gold medal – first place	1964 Tokyo	3m springboard
Pan American Games
Bronze medal – third place	1963 São Paulo	3m springboard

Kenneth Robert "Ken" Sitzberger (February 13, 1945 – January 2, 1984) was an American diver, who competed for Indiana University and won a gold medal in springboard diving at the 1964 Tokyo Olympics. He would later work as a real estate executive and a television swimming and diving commentator for the American Broadcasting Company sports broadcasts, often during the Olympics.

Ken Sitzberger was born February 13, 1945, one of around five siblings, in Cedar Rapids, Iowa to Francis "Frank" J. and Bette Sitzberger but grew up in greater Chicago's River Forest area. He took an interest in swimming by the age of six, took swimming lessons at a local club, and began diving not long after, though he had an early interest in basketball competition as well and enjoyed baseball. Prior to High School, he was a student at St. Edmunds, a Catholic grade school and junior high in an historic church with the appearance of a small cathedral on S. Oak Park Avenue in Oak Park, Illinois. The school struggled with funding and enrollment issues and closed in 2016.

== High school era diving ==
Graduating in 1963, he competed in diving for Oak Park, Illinois's Fenwick High School, founded as a private Catholic School with strong academics. With a strong reputation in academics and sports, Fenwick enrolled only boys when Sitzberger attended, and had a dress code requiring a tie and white shirt. He swam under Fenwick's Head Swimming Coach Dan O'Brien, winning Chicago Catholic League and Central AAU diving titles in all four years. Though he had never swum competitively, Fenwick's dominance in league swimming with Dan O'Brien as coach was exceptional. In the 23 years from 1942 to 1965 that O'Brien directed the swim and dive team, the Fenwick Friars won the Chicago Catholic League all twenty-three, and acquired an undefeated record of 325–0 in dual meets in league competition. Throughout his High School years, Sitzberger received essential dive coaching from University of Wisconsin Dive Coach and All American 1956 Fenwick alumni Jerry Darda, particularly on the 3 meter board as the Fenwick High pool didn't have one. Sitzberger was an All American in diving for three years from 1961 to 1963. As a sixteen-year old Fenwick Sophomore, he placed sixth in the one-meter diving event at the National AAU Diving Competition at Yale in April 1961, making him the youngest contestant ever to place in a National AAU meet. Sitzberger also held Catholic League and Central AAU diving titles in his event by his Sophomore year.

As a Fenwick Senior, he was one of only two High School students to be named to America's Pan American team, and trained for the competition with the American team in Florida. Subsequent to his training, he competed in the 3 m springboard and won a bronze medal at the April 1963 Pan American Games in São Paulo, Brazil. Excelling as a diver, in four years of high school competition, Sitzberger never lost to another high school or teen-age competitor. He maintained a quality grade point average and was a member of the National Honor Society.

== 1964 Olympics ==
After a year at Indiana, as a nineteen-year-old Sitzberger won a gold medal at the October 1964 Olympics in springboard diving, becoming the youngest person to ever place first in the event. He was trailing on the 3 meter board to American teammate Frank Gorman after nine of the ten dives, but Gorman performed poorly on his last dive, while Sitzberger was almost perfect, performing a backward 1 1/2 somersault with 2 1/2 twists. Gorman's ninth dive was a 2 1/2 tuck somersault, in which he did quite poorly, and received only 10.8 points, falling in back of Sitzberger. American diver Larry Andreasen took the bronze medal, giving the Americans a full sweep of the event. Sitzberger's gold medal was America's tenth consecutive gold in the event.

== Indiana University ==
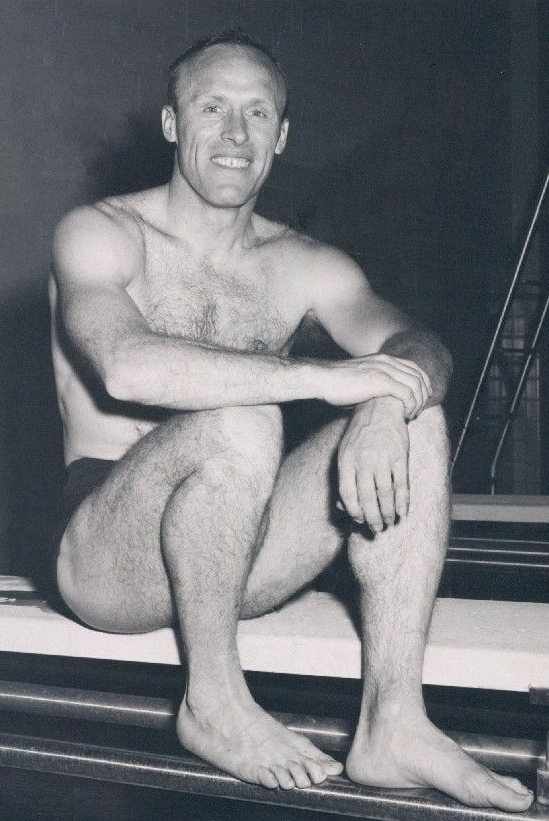
Coach Billingsley

After graduating Fenwick High School, Sitzberger enrolled at Indiana University, and began attending in the Fall of 1963. As a diving competitor at Indiana under former Ohio State diver and Hall of Fame Head Dive Coach Hobie Billingsley, Sitzberger won a total of five NCAA Championship titles, and was the AAU indoor champion three times. As a highly accomplished coach, leading a dominant team, between 1959 and 1989 Coach Billingsley led the Indiana Swim and Dive team to six NCAA national swimming and diving team championships, and coached the U.S. Olympic diving team in 1968, 1972, and 1976.

While at Indiana, Sitzberger captured first at the AAU national indoor 1-meter and 3-meter springboard championships in 1964 and 1965. He was the NCAA champion in the 1-meter from 1965 through 1967, and in the 3-meter springboard in 1966 and 1967. Graduating in 1967, Sitzberger lettered in Varsity swimming in 1965 through 1967, at Indiana, and was voted a Scholar Athlete of the Big 10 in his Senior year.

=== Marriage and career ===
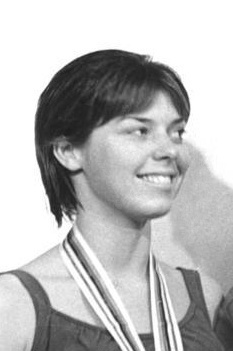
Silver medalist Jeanne Collier, 63 Olympics

Having first met at the U.S. National Diving competition in 1962, Sitzberger married 1964 Olympic 3 meter Olympic silver medalist Jeanne Collier on August 27, 1966, at St. Gregory's Church in Collier's hometown of Phoenix, Arizona. Jeanne's sister Sarah served as maid of honor, with sisters Mary Beth and Patricia as attendants. Francis D. Sitzberger served as Kenneth's best man. The couple's wedding trip was to Northern California, a state where they would move around 1980, though they initially resided in Bloomington while Sitzberger completed college at Indiana. At the time of their wedding, Sitzberger was a Senior and accounting major at Indiana where he was a member of Phi Delta Theta. The couple would have three daughters.

Sitzberger worked primarily part-time or in intervals for around 18 years as a sports commentator for the American Broadcasting Company until his death in 1984 at the age of 38. When not engaged as a broadcaster, he worked as a real estate executive and spent time tending to his real estate investments. He had been involved in the recreational real estate development of Park City, Utah.

Sitzberger died in Coronado, California of a brain hemorrhage likely in his sleep after having been found unconscious by his wife in bed on the morning of January 2, 1984. He was brought to Coronado Hospital, for a death pronouncement and the Coroner later determined there was head trauma and internal bleeding. He had lived in the Cornado area since around 1980, formerly living briefly in the Park City, Utah area working in real estate, and prior in the greater Chicago area in Hinsdale, and River Forest, Illinois where he grew up. He died under somewhat mysterious circumstances. His wife Jeanne said that he had fallen and hit his head on a table during a New Year's Eve party at their home the prior day, and his death was ruled an accident. Police said Sitzberger twice picked fights with another man at the New Year's party, and in the second scuffle he struck his head. Because he had been subpoenaed as a federal witness in a cocaine-trafficking case, police continued to investigate his death, but discovered no evidence of foul play. Memorial services for Sitzberger were held first at Coronado's Sacred Heart Catholic Church and then in his former hometown at St. Isaac Jogues Catholic Church in Hinsdale, Illinois, on Friday, January 6. He was buried at Queen of Heaven Cemetery in Hillside, Illinois, just west of Chicago.

=== Honors ===
Sitzberger was inducted into the Indiana University Athletic Hall of Fame in 1996, and is a member of the Fenwick High School Hall of Fame. Because of his exceptional early achievements as a diver, and possibly his contributions to diving as a television commentator, he was made a member of the International Swimming Hall of Fame in 1994. For his contributions to their athletic program as an individual competitor, Sitzberger became a member of the Chicago Catholic League Hall of Fame in a ceremony on May 5, 1971, in Chicago.

== See also ==
- List of members of the International Swimming Hall of Fame
