= Sohan Singh (diver) =

Indian diver

Personal information
- Nationality: Indian
- Born: 15 September 1936 (age 88)

Sport
- Sport: Diving

Sohan Singh (born 15 September 1936) is an Indian diver. He competed in the men's 10 metre platform event at the 1964 Summer Olympics.
