= Lou Galloway =

American volleyball player (born 1942)

Louisa Sara Galloway (born January 7, 1942) is a former volleyball player. She played for the United States national team, at the 1964 Summer Olympics.
