= William Griebenow =

American volleyball player (born 1943)

William Griebenow (born 15 April 1943) is an American former volleyball player who competed (as Bill Griebenow) in the 1964 Summer Olympics.
