= Viktor Pogozhev =

Soviet diver

Personal information
- Nationality: Soviet
- Born: 30 September 1941 (age 83)

Sport
- Sport: Diving

Viktor Pogozhev (born 30 September 1941) is a Soviet diver. He competed at the 1964 Summer Olympics and the 1968 Summer Olympics.
