= Jeanne Collier =

American diver

Jeanne Ellen Collier
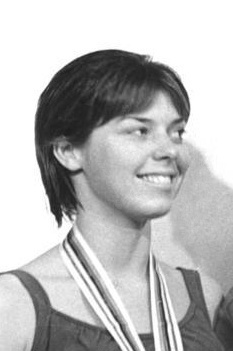
- Collier with medal at the 1964 Olympics

Personal information
- Born: May 15, 1946 (age 80) Indianapolis, Indiana, United States
- Height: 1.56 m (5 ft 1 in)
- Weight: 48 kg (106 lb)
- Spouse: Kenneth Sitzberger (m 1966)
- Children: 3

Sport
- Sport: Diving
- Club: Dick Smith Swim Gym
- Coached by: Dick Smith
Medal record
Representing the United States
Olympic Games
Silver medal – second place	1964 Tokyo	Springboard

Jeanne Ellen Collier (born May 15, 1946), known by her married name as Jeanne Collier Sitzberger after 1966, is a former American springboard diver who swam for the Dick Smith Swim Gym in Phoenix, Arizona. She competed at the 1964 Summer Olympics in Tokyo and won a silver medal in the 3 meter springboard.

Collier was born one of five siblings on May 15, 1946, to Robert Michael and Lucy Collier, in Indianapolis, Indiana. Demonstrating a remarkable early talent and an affinity for the sport, she first took to diving around the age of ten, and by twelve was competing in national competitions. Distinguishing herself nationally in her early career, she attended the 1960 Olympic trials at the age of 14. After a move to Phoenix, she swam for the Dick Smith Swim Gym, and in the summer of 1961, won the 3 meter diving competition at the Jr. National Championships in Denver prior to her High School Sophomore year. At the U.S. Senior National Diving Championships in Philadelphia in 1961, Jeanne took a sixth place in the 3 meter diving event. Among an array of adult competitors, she was the second youngest. Collier was named to the 1962 All America team.

== Early swimming and education ==
Collier won the 1963 AAU Championships on the springboard. She graduated from Xavier High School (Arizona) in Phoenix in May, 1964, where she served as Senior Class President.

== 1964 Tokyo Olympics ==
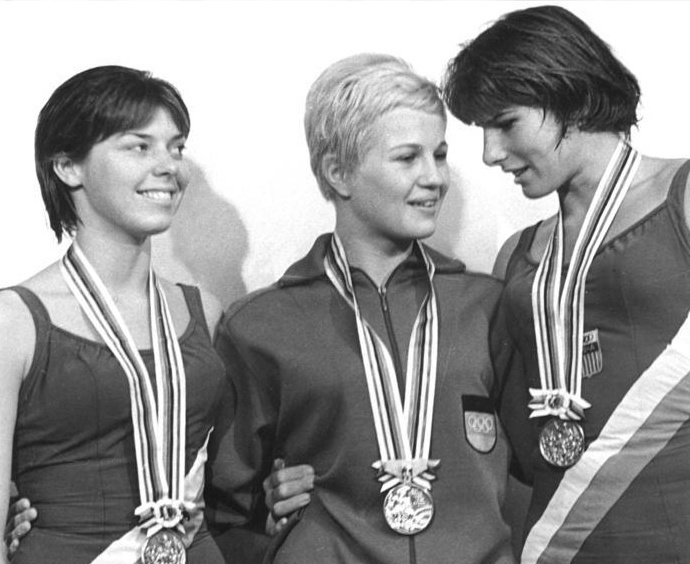
Collier (left), I. Krämer (Gold) and Patsy Willard, at the '64 Olympics

On September 4, 1964, Collier clinched a place on the U.S. Olympic team, along with Sue Gossick of Los Angeles and Patsy Willard of Phoenix, diving at the 3 meter qualifying trials for the 1964 Olympics at the Olympic Pool at Astoria, New York. Collier won the 3 meter event.

As the youngest member of the women's team on October 11–12, she won the silver medal at the 1964 Tokyo Olympics, placing second in 3 meter springboard diving competition behind gold medalist Ingrid Kramer-Engel of East Germany. It was America's first medal in Tokyo. Kramer-Engel trailed for the first six dives behind American diver Patsy Willard, but went ahead in the last dive of the preliminaries, and retained the lead in the final three subsequent dives. Collier did not move into second place until her final dive, coming from well behind in the scoring, to take second place behind Kramer-Engel, and nose ahead of Patsy Willard who dropped to third place to take the bronze.

Collier's final dive was a reverse 1 1/2 somersault with a 1 1/2 twist, considered the most difficult of the final dives, and gave her a 17.42, the highest score of the final round. American diver Patsy Willard later claimed she performed below her expectations on her final dive. Jeanne's diving coach Dick Smith with whom she had trained for many years at the Dick Smith Swim Gym in Phoenix was also her U.S. Diving Coach at the 1964 Olympics. In addition to Jeanne, 1964 U.S. Olympic team members who had formerly been trained by Dick Smith included Patsy Willard, Tom Gompf, and Lesley Bush, who all received diving medals.

== Life after diving ==
After the Olympics, and an exhibition tour in Japan, Collier retired from diving. Upon her return to Phoenix, she was met by an enthusiastic crowd which surprised, but pleased her. The Olympics were not yet a major attraction on American television in 1964, and were broadcast late at night. Because of her husband's work as a diving announcer, she would attend the Olympic games through 1980, during the years the Olympics gained a larger American audience.

Collier attended Phoenix College, and Indiana University, Bloomington, where she was a member of Kappa Alpha Theta.

Having first met at the U.S. National Diving competition in 1962, Collier married Kenneth Robert Sitzberger on August 27, 1966, at St. Gregory's Church in Phoenix. Jeanne's sister Sarah served as maid of honor, with sisters Mary Beth and Patricia as attendants. Francis D. Sitzberger served as Kenneth's best man. The couple's wedding trip was to Northern California, a state where they would move around 1980, though they initially resided in Bloomington while Sitzberger completed college at Indiana. At the time of their wedding, Sitzberger was a Senior and accounting major at Indiana where he was a member of Phi Delta Theta. Sitzberger competed in diving for Indiana University, and captured a gold medal at the men's 1 meter springboard event at the 1964 Olympics where the couple continued to enjoy their friendship. At the time of their wedding, Sitzberger was a Senior and accounting major at Indiana. The couple dated and corresponded sporadically after the 1964 Olympics, and Collier would attend Indiana University with Sitzberger.

Sitzberger and Collier had three daughters. Before his death in 1984, Sitzberger retained a connection to his sport while working for the American Broadcasting Company as a commentator for diving competitions, where he had worked since around 1966. When not engaged as a broadcaster, Sitzberger worked as a real estate executive and spent time tending to his real estate investments. He died in Coronado, California of a brain hemorrhage likely in his sleep after having been found unconscious by wife Jeanne in bed on the morning of January 2, 1984. He had struck his head on a table at a New Years party at the Sitzberger home the previous day.

In the Spring of 1984, urged by her daughters, Collier Sitzberger coached diving at Coronado High School (California) in Coronado, California. The couple had moved there around 1984, having previously lived in Park City, Utah, in 1980 and formerly in the Chicago area.
