= Frank Gorman (diver) =

American diver (born 1937)

Personal information
- Born: November 11, 1937 (age 88) New York, New York, USA
- Height: 178 cm (5 ft 10 in)
- Weight: 70 kg (154 lb)

Sport
- College team: Harvard University
- Club: US Navy Swim Team; Dick Smith Swim Gym (Philadelphia, PA)
- Coached by: Harold Ulen (Harvard); Dick Smith
Medal record
Men's diving
Representing the United States
Olympic Games
Silver medal – second place	1964 Tokyo	3 metre springboard

Francis Xavier "Frank" Gorman (born November 11, 1937, in New York, New York) is a former American diver, who dove for Harvard University and was a 1964 Tokyo silver medalist in men's 3 metre springboard.

== Early life and high school ==
Born November 11, 1937 in New York, as the youngest of six athletic siblings, Gorman began swimming at seven. In the summer, his family would take him to Brewster, New York's Lake Tonetta, and his older brothers and sister would teach him to do acrobatic tricks after throwing him into the air. Doing a few somersaults off the diving board of a pier was a natural progression. Beginning as a Forward for his Junior High School basketball team, he soon found success diving for his High School team. In 1952, he became the youngest male competitor to ever place first in New York City's Public School Athletic League Diving Championships. After winning the competition in four successive years, he caught the attention of Harvards Coach Harold Ulen. In an interview, Gorman recalled he was first contacted by Harvard as a Sophomore diver, and by his Junior year had visited the campus twice, and been offered a scholarship.

He attended and dove for Harvard University under Coach Harold Ulen, graduating around 1960. While competing at Harvard, from 1957-1960 Gorman was an NCAA All American in both the 1 meter, and 3 meter springboard competitions. A dominant competitor against collegiate competition, during his collegiate career from 1957-1960 he never lost a dual meet to another diver. A highly accomplished coach, from 1929–59, Ulen's Harvard swimmers had a record of 261-48 in dual meets. Twenty years before Gorman, future President John F. Kennedy, a 1940 graduate, swam for Ulen, who remembered him as a slender, and frail backstroker.

After graduating College, and failing to make the 1960 Olympic trials, Gorman served in the U.S. Navy where as a Lieutenant he was a physical education coach at the U.S. Naval Academy, and coach Varsity diving for Naval Academy diving teams. He later served as an investment broker and worked in telecommunications.

By 1964, while training for the Olympics, Gorman swam and competed for the U.S. Navy Team, and Philadelphia's Dick Smith Swim Gym, where he was coached by Hall of Fame dive Coach Dick Smith. On September 4, he won the 1964 U.S. Olympic Trials on the 3 meter springboard with Larry Andreasen second, and Ken Stizberger of Indiana University taking third.

== 1964 Tokyo Olympic silver medal ==
At the 1964 Tokyo Olympics, though he had placed first at the U.S. trials, Gorman placed second and won the silver medal in the 3 meter springboard competition. His finish was part of an American sweep in the 1964 Olympic 3 meter springboard event, with Ken Sitzberger and Larry Andreasen placing first and third, respectively. Gorman was well in front in the diving competition through eight dives, with American team mates Sitzberger and Andreasen trailing him. But on his ninth dive of ten, a 2 1/2 somersault with tuck went quite poorly, and he earned a score of only 10.08 points allowing Sitzberger to take the lead. Andreasen also did less well on his ninth dive, but remained in third place. Sitzberger clinched the gold medal on his tenth and final dive, a back 1½ that featured 2½ twists. Gorman and Andreasen retained their positions after their final dive to finish second and third. It was the last American sweep in a diving event, which will never be repeated, as only two divers per country have been allowed for each Olympic diving events since 1984.

=== Service to the diving community ===
Gorman has served and participated as a contributing member of USA Diving as well as the United States Olympic Committee. He was a judge at the Olympic games in 1968, and helped judge the World Championships, and the Pan American Games, High Diving and Cliff Diving competitions. He later attended the 2008 Beijing Olympics.

After his swimming and naval career, he worked as an investment broker and later switched to the field of telecommunications.

=== Honors ===
Gorman was inducted into the International Swimming Hall of Fame. In 1960, Gorman became an Eastern Intercollegiate Champion on both the 1 meter and 3 meter springboards.
