= Lawrence Andreasen =

American diver (1945–1990)

- Andreasen in 1964, with bronze medal

Personal information
- Full name: Lawrence Edwin Andreasen
- Nickname: Larry
- Born: November 13, 1945 Long Beach, California, U.S.
- Died: October 26, 1990 (aged 44) Los Angeles, California, U.S.
- Occupation: Diver
Medal record
Men's diving
Representing United States
Olympic Games
Bronze medal – third place	1964 Tokyo	Springboard

Lawrence Edwin "Larry" Andreasen (November 13, 1945 – October 26, 1990) was an American diver. He represented his country at the 1964 Summer Olympics in Tokyo, where he received the bronze medal in springboard diving.

== Life ==
=== Competition ===
Andreasen started diving at the age of 14; his first dive was into the backyard pool of 1952 and 1956 Olympic diving champion Pat McCormick and her husband Glenn, whose house was on Andreasen's Seal Beach newspaper delivery route. When he was 17, Andreasen won a California state championship and the Amateur Athletic Union (AAU) national junior and senior springboard championships, and finished second in the AAU 10 metre platform dive. He was later selected for the AAU team competing against a Japanese team in 1963, where he beat Toshio Yamano, Japan's representative for the 1960 3 metre springboard competition.

Andreasen's Tokyo 1964 finish capped an Olympic springboard diving medal sweep for the American team, with Ken Sitzberger and Frank Gorman placing first and second, respectively. Gorman had beaten Andreasen (second) and Sitzberger (third) at the U.S. Olympics trials the previous month. Just before his turn on the diving board, the Japanese diver ahead of him struck the board, and Andreasen jumped into the pool to pull him out.

=== Exhibition ===
Andreasen was also noted for his exhibition diving, showcasing his talents at the dedication ceremonies for the Peck Park swimming pool in San Pedro in 1962. When the Cunard Line's Queen Mary ocean liner was permanently retired in Long Beach harbor in 1967 as a tourist attraction, at the grand opening festivities Andreasen dove off the ship's bridge into the harbor, delighting the crowd although the impact heavily bruised his entire upper body for days afterward.

=== Bridges and death ===
In later years, Andreasen attempted on several occasions to set the record for the highest dive from a bridge. On September 29, 1988 he successfully jumped 160 feet (49 m) from the Gerald Desmond Bridge in Long Beach, California. A 4-foot (1.2 m) overhang meant he could not attempt a dive headfirst, thus preventing him from breaking the record. He was cited for an infraction by the police for this undertaking, and he swore off further attempts, saying "I've had it with diving ... That's it, I'm retired" from the hospital where he was taken after the fall temporarily paralyzed his chest and arms.

In December 1988, he was talked down by police from the Vincent Thomas Bridge in Los Angeles in another attempt to break the record, later saying he "just wanted to see if he had the old Olympic stuff." Andreasen was arrested for trespassing at the same bridge in April 1989, and he was committed to Metropolitan State Hospital for his safety in March 1990, but was reported missing late in the evening of October 25. On October 26, 1990, Andreasen was killed after apparently diving from the 385-foot (117 m) west tower of the same bridge. His death was ruled an accident.
