= Terry Rossiter =

Zimbabwean diver (born 1944)

Personal information
- Nationality: Zimbabwean
- Born: 2 July 1944 (age 80)

Sport
- Sport: Diving

Terry Rossiter (born 2 July 1944) was a Zimbabwean diver. He competed in two events at the 1964 Summer Olympics.
