= Klaus Konzorr =

German diver

Personal information
- Nationality: German
- Born: 22 September 1940 (age 84); Danzig, Germany

Sport
- Sport: Diving

Klaus Konzorr (born 22 September 1940) is a German diver. He competed at the 1964 Summer Olympics, the 1968 Summer Olympics, and the 1972 Summer Olympics.
