= Johanna Hall =

British equestrian

Personal information
- Nationality: British
- Born: 24 May 1934; Rotterdam, Netherlands
- Died: 9 February 1996 (aged 61); Slough, England

Sport
- Sport: Equestrian

Johanna Hall (24 May 1934 – 9 February 1996) was a British equestrian. She competed at the 1960 Summer Olympics, the 1964 Summer Olympics and the 1968 Summer Olympics.

In the 1950s she went on holiday to Austria and received lessons in the famous Vienna riding school. During these lessons she become closely acquainted with a young British man, Robert Hall (1924-2014). She joined him in England where he ran the Fulmer School of Equitation in Gerrards Cross, Buckinghamshire. They married in 1958. They had two sons in 1962 (Henry Hall) and 1966 (Roland Hall) and lived in The White House in Fulmer, Buckinghamshire.

Just before the Rome Olympics Hall competed in Ascot and her win impressed the GB selectors so enormously that they asked her to compete for GB in the Olympics in Rome. Her nationality papers had to be quickly sorted out.

She won the GB Championship in 1962, and went on to compete in Tokyo in 1964 and is the first foreigner and British rider to win the prestigious Hamburg Dressage Derby in 1965.

1960	Rome Olympics	Individual dressage 13th
1962	National Champion	
1964	Tokyo Olympics	Individual dressage 12th
1965	Hamburg Dressage Derby	1st prize
1968	Mexico Olympics	Individual dressage 14th
