= Patsy Willard =

American diver (born 1941)

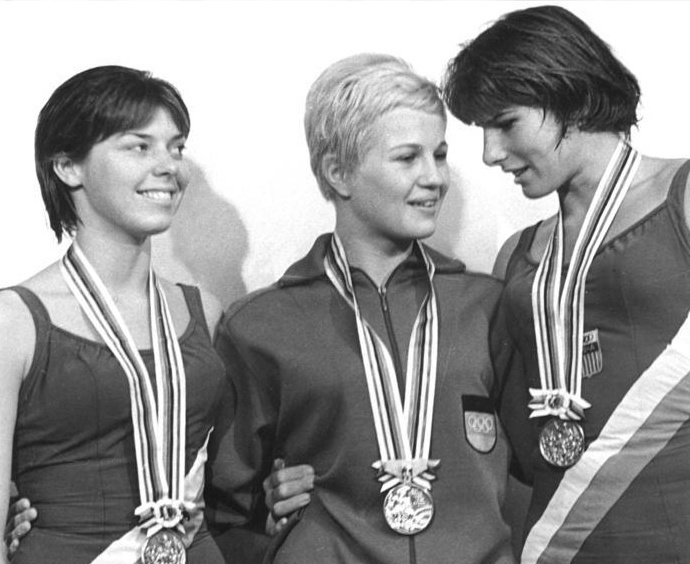
- Jeanne Collier, Ingrid Krämer and Patsy Willard (right) at the 1964 Olympics

Personal information
- Full name: Mary Patricia Willard
- Born: May 18, 1941 (age 85) Phoenix, Arizona, U.S.
- Height: 5 ft 7 in (170 cm)
- Weight: 130 lb (59 kg)

Sport
- Sport: Diving
- College team: Arizona State University
- Club: Dick Smith Swim Gym
- Coached by: Dick Smith (Smith Swim Gym, ASU)
Medal record
Women's diving
Representing the United States
Olympic Games
Bronze medal – third place	1964 Tokyo	3m springboard
Pan American Games
Bronze medal – third place	1963 São Paulo	3m springboard

Mary Patricia ("Patsy") Willard (born May 18, 1941) is a former American diver, who attended and dove for Arizona State University, and won a bronze medal in the three-meter springboard at the 1964 Tokyo Olympics. She finished a close fourth in springboard diving at the 1960 Olympics.

Willard was born in Phoenix, Arizona on May 18, 1941. She was a 1959 graduate of Mesa High School in Mesa, Arizona, and swam for the Dick Smith Swim Gym. Representing the Dick Smith Gym in July 1959, she took second place in the women's National AAU 3-meter diving competition in Redding, California. She took first in 1-meter springboard diving in December 1960 at the Mid-Winter Aquatic Festival in Phoenix.

== Olympics ==
She competed at the 1964 Summer Olympics in Tokyo, where she won a bronze medal in the 3 meter springboard event. Willard finished only .18 points behind American diver Jeanne Collier who took the silver, and finished around seven points behind Ingrid Engel Kramer of Germany, who took the gold medal. Through the first six dives of the preliminaries, Willard held the lead, but Kramer pulled ahead in the final dive of the preliminaries and maintained the lead throughout the last three dives. Kramer would prove to be an outstanding performer in Olympic competition.

At 19, at the 1960 Summer Olympics in Rome, she finished a close fourth place in the springboard to Liz Ferris of Great Britain who took the bronze. Ingrid Kramer of Germany easily took the gold medal, with Paula Jean Pope of the U.S. team taking the silver. Members of the American press were disappointed with Pope's second place finish, but Kramer would prove to be a dominant diver in Olympic competition.

Willard won a bronze at the 1963 Pan American Games in São Paulo, Brazil in the 3-meter springboard.

In 1964, she was the outdoors Champion on the 1-metre springboard and the 10-metre platform. She won national titles in indoor competition on the 1-metre springboard in 1960, 1962, and 1963, and captured a national title on platform in 1966.

== Arizona State University ==
She attended and swam for Arizona State University, about 10 miles West of Mesa in Tempe, Arizona. At ASU, she was an All American each of the four years she competed. At ASU, she was managed by Hall of Fame Dive Coach Dick Smith, who had coached her during several of her High School years. The Arizona women's swimming team was managed by Coach Mona Plummer.
