= Toshio Yamano =

Japanese diver

Personal information
- Nationality: Japanese
- Born: 15 July 1937 (age 88) Ishikawa Prefecture, Japan

Sport
- Sport: Diving
Medal record
Representing Japan
Asian Games
Silver medal – second place	1958 Tokyo	10m platform

Toshio Yamano (山野外嗣夫, Yamano Toshio; born 15 July 1937) is a Japanese diver. He competed at the 1960 Summer Olympics and the 1964 Summer Olympics.
