= Nagahira Okabe =

Japanese equestrian

Personal information
- Nationality: Japanese
- Born: 10 August 1913
- Died: 2001 (aged 87–88)

Sport
- Sport: Equestrian

Nagahira Okabe (10 August 1913 – 2001) was a Japanese equestrian. He competed in two events at the 1964 Summer Olympics.
