= Yoritsune Matsudaira (equestrian) =

Japanese equestrian

Personal information
- Nationality: Japanese
- Born: 23 December 1940 (age 84)

Sport
- Sport: Equestrian

Yoritsune Matsudaira (born 23 December 1940) is a Japanese equestrian. He competed in two events at the 1964 Summer Olympics.
