= Gustav Fischer (equestrian) =

Swiss equestrian

Personal information
- Born: 8 November 1915 Meisterschwanden, Switzerland
- Died: 22 November 1990 (aged 75)
Medal record
Equestrian
Representing Switzerland
Olympic Games
Silver medal – second place	1952 Helsinki	Team dressage
Silver medal – second place	1960 Rome	Individual dressage
Silver medal – second place	1964 Tokyo	Team dressage
Bronze medal – third place	1956 Stockholm	Team dressage
Bronze medal – third place	1968 Mexico City	Team dressage
World Championships
Silver medal – second place	1966 Bern	Team dressage
European Championships
Silver medal – second place	1965 Copenhagen	Team dressage

Gustav Fischer (8 November 1915 – 22 November 1990) was a Swiss equestrian athlete who competed at five Summer Olympic Games, winning a total of five medals. He won medals in the team dressage events in the 1952, 1956, 1964, and 1968 games; there was no team dressage event held in 1960, but he won an individual dressage medal in that year.

In 1968, he and fellow equestrian Henri Chammartin jointly became the second Swiss sportspersons to compete at five Olympic Games. (The first was middle-distance runner Paul Martin.)

== Early life ==
Fischer was born on 8 November 1915 in Meisterschwanden, Switzerland.

== Olympic career ==
Fischer first competed in the 1952 Summer Olympics in Helsinki, Finland at the age of 36, in both the individual and team dressage events. He came in a disappointing 8th place in the individual event, behind both of his Swiss teammates; Gottfried Trachsel, who finished 4th, and Henri Chammartin, who finished 6th. However, he earned the first of five Olympic medals, a silver, in the team event with Trachsel and Chammartin. Four years later, at the 1956 Summer Olympics in Stockholm, Sweden, Fischer again medaled in the team event, and again fell short in the individual. This time, Trachsel, Chammartin, and Fischer took bronze, and finished 6th, 8th, and 10th respectively in the individual event.

Of the three athletes, only Fischer and Chammartin would compete in the 1960 Summer Olympics in Rome, Italy, although in any case no team dressage event was held that year. However, Fischer found new success, winning second place and a silver medal in the individual dressage competition, the only individual medal of his career. The 1964 Summer Olympics in Tokyo, Japan, saw Fischer as the oldest member of the Swiss team, at 48 years of age. That year, he just missed winning a second individual medal in dressage, taking fourth place while his teammate Henri Chammartin took gold. However, with Chammartin and 21-year-old Marianne Gossweiler, the youngest Swiss equestrian athlete at the games, Fischer earned yet another silver medal in team dressage. He won his final Olympic medal at the 1968 Summer Olympics in Mexico City, Mexico at the age of 52, a bronze in team dressage, again with Chammartin and Gossweiler.

== Later life ==
Fischer died on 22 November 1990.

== See also ==
- List of athletes with the most appearances at Olympic Games
