= William Hamilton (equestrian) =

Swedish equestrian

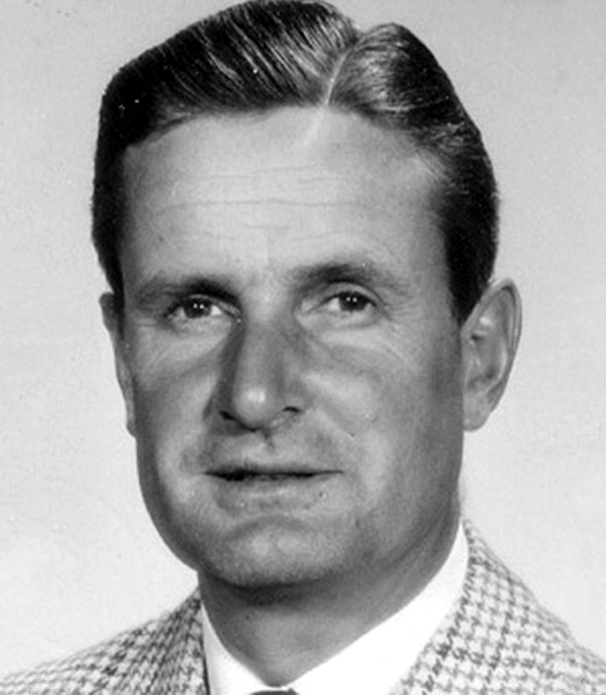

Personal information
- Born: 15 August 1921 Kolbäck, Sweden
- Died: 12 December 2007 (aged 86) Eldsberga, Sweden
- Height: 189 cm (6 ft 2 in)
- Weight: 83 kg (183 lb)

Sport
- Sport: Horse riding
- Club: K3 IF, Skövde

Henning William Percy Hamilton (15 August 1921 – 12 December 2007) was a Swedish Army officer and equestrian. He competed in the mixed dressage at the 1964 Summer Olympics and finished ninth individually and fifth with the Swedish team. He served as the Swedish Olympic flag bearer at those Games.

Hamilton was ryttmästare in the Swedish Army.
