= Linda Cooper (diver) =

American diver

Personal information
- Born: July 19, 1944 (age 81)
Medal record
Women's diving
Representing the United States
Pan American Games
Gold medal – first place	1963 São Paulo	10m Platform

Linda Lee Cooper (born July 19, 1944, in Loma Linda, California) is the maiden name for Linda Tiger, an American platform diver who represented the United States at the 1964 Summer Olympics.

== Diving Achievements ==
- Gold Medal at the 1963 Pan American Games in São Paulo, Brazil
- Fourth place finish at the 1964 Summer Olympics in Tokyo, Japan

== Published books ==
- A Touch of Prayer: An illustrated children's book about the loving gift of touch during prayer between a mother and her child. Written by Linda Tiger. Illustrated by Tricia Gray.

== See also ==
- Diving at the 1963 Pan American Games
- Diving at the 1964 Summer Olympics - Women's 10 metre platform
- List of passengers on the Mayflower
