= Kikuko Inoue (equestrian) =

Japanese equestrian (1924–2018)

Personal information
- Nationality: Japanese
- Born: 3 December 1924 Tokyo, Japan
- Died: 16 February 2018 (aged 93) Tokyo, Japan

Sport
- Sport: Equestrian

Kikuko Inoue (Japanese: 井上喜久子, 3 December 1924 – 16 February 2018) was a Japanese equestrian. She competed at the 1964 Summer Olympics, the 1972 Summer Olympics, and the 1988 Summer Olympics. At the 1988 Olympics, she was the oldest Japanese Olympian.

Her maternal grandfather was businessman Asano Sōichirō. Both her father, Masashi Hide, and her mother, Keiko Masugi, were experienced equestrians.

Inoue died on 16 February 2018 at home in Tokyo due to acute heart failure, aged 93. An obituary was published on 16 January 2019, about 11 months after his death.
