= Henri Chammartin =

Swiss equestrian

Personal information
- Born: 30 July 1918
- Died: 30 May 2011 (aged 92)
- Height: 1.76 m (5 ft 9 in)
- Weight: 71 kg (157 lb)
Medal record
Equestrian
Representing Switzerland
Olympic Games
Gold medal – first place	1964 Tokyo	Individual dressage
Silver medal – second place	1952 Helsinki	Team dressage
Silver medal – second place	1964 Tokyo	Team dressage
Bronze medal – third place	1956 Stockholm	Team dressage
Bronze medal – third place	1968 Mexico City	Team dressage
World Championships
Silver medal – second place	1966 Bern	Team dressage
European Championships
Gold medal – first place	1963 Copenhagen	Individual dressage
Gold medal – first place	1965 Copenhagen	Individual dressage
Silver medal – second place	1965 Copenhagen	Team dressage
Bronze medal – third place	1963 Copenhagen	Individual dressage
Bronze medal – third place	1967 Aachen	Team dressage

Henri Chammartin (30 July 1918 – 30 May 2011) was a Swiss equestrian who won an individual gold medal in dressage at the 1964 Summer Olympics in Tokyo.

In 1968, he and fellow equestrian Gustav Fischer both became the second Swiss sportspersons to compete at five Olympic Games. (The first was middle-distance runner Paul Martin.) At the Summer Olympics of 1968 made in Mexico City, his last Olympics, won his fifth medal: a bronze medal in team competition, finishing ninth in addition to the individual test.

He won five medals in total at the European Dressage Championships including two individual gold medals in 1963 and 1965.

Following Chammartin's death, the International Equestrian Federation noted that he will be remembered as "a legend in the dressage world".

== See also ==
- List of athletes with the most appearances at Olympic Games
