= Marianne Gossweiler =

Swiss equestrian

Personal information
- Born: 15 May 1943 (age 83) Schaffhausen, Switzerland
Medal record
Equestrian
Representing Switzerland
Olympic Games
Silver medal – second place	1964 Tokyo	Team dressage
Bronze medal – third place	1968 Mexico City	Team dressage
World Championships
Silver medal – second place	1966 Bern	Team dressage
European Championships
Silver medal – second place	1965 Copenhagen	Team dressage
Bronze medal – third place	1967 Aachen	Team dressage

Marianne Gossweiler (born 15 May 1943 in Schaffhausen) is a Swiss Equestrian. She placed seventh in individual dressage and won a silver medal in team dressage at the 1964 Summer Olympics in Tokyo. She a won bronze medal in team dressage at the 1968 Summer Olympics. She is married to sports rower Urs Fankhauser. For some time she was an anti-suffragist and was against the introduction of women's suffrage in Canton Schaffhausen in 1967.

She is the first female athlete on a Swiss Olympics sport team.
