= Karen McIntosh =

American equestrian

Personal information
- Born: January 14, 1940 (age 86) Gloversville, New York, United States

Sport
- Sport: Equestrian
Medal record
Equestrian
Representing the United States
Pan American Games
Silver medal – second place	1959 Chicago	Team dressage

Karen McIntosh (born January 14, 1940) is an American equestrian. She competed in two events at the 1964 Summer Olympics.
