= Patricia Galvin =

American equestrian

- Galvin in 1960

Personal information
- Full name: Patricia Galvin de la Tour d'Auvergne
- Nationality: American
- Born: March 20, 1939 (age 87) Singapore

Sport
- Sport: Equestrian
Medal record
Equestrian
Representing the United States
Pan American Games
Gold medal – first place	1959 Chicago	Individual dressage
Gold medal – first place	1963 São Paulo	Individual dressage
Silver medal – second place	1959 Chicago	Team dressage

Patricia Galvin (born March 20, 1939) is an American equestrian.

Galvin was born in Singapore and attended Sweet Briar College in the United States. She competed in dressage for the United States in both the 1960 Summer Olympics and the 1964 Summer Olympics. She also won silver in the 1959 Pan American Games.

Between 1960 and 1964, she married Georges-Henri de la Tour d’Auvergne Lauragais, a French noble. She settled in Santa Barbara, California where she became president of the Canrise Corporation.
