= Jessica Newberry-Ransehousen =

American equestrian

Personal information
- Nationality: American
- Born: October 14, 1938 (age 87) London, England

Sport
- Sport: Equestrian
Medal record
Equestrian
Representing the United States
Pan American Games
| Silver medal – second place | 1959 Chicago | Team dressage |

Jessica Newberry-Ransehousen (born October 14, 1938) is an American equestrian. She competed at the 1960 Summer Olympics, the 1964 Summer Olympics and the 1988 Summer Olympics.
