= Tom Gompf =

American diver (born 1939)

Personal information
- Full name: Thomas Eugen Gompf
- Born: March 17, 1939 (age 87) Dayton, Ohio, U.S.
- Height: 180 cm (5 ft 11 in)
- Weight: 75 kg (165 lb)

Sport
- Events: Diving, 10-meter platform
- College team: Ohio State
- Club: Dick Smith Swim Gym
- Coached by: Mike Peppe (OSU)
Medal record
Men's diving
Representing the United States
Olympic Games
Bronze medal – third place	1964 Tokyo	10 metre platform

Thomas Eugen Gompf (born March 17, 1939, in Dayton, Ohio) is an American former diver who competed for Ohio State University and won a bronze medal in the 10-meter platform at the 1964 Summer Olympics in Tokyo.

Gompf was born March 17, 1939, in Dayton, Ohio, and attended Stivers High School. He trained with the Dayton YMCA swim team where in 1957, his Senior year, he served as Captain, and was coached by Don Freeman. Gompf was the defending YMCA title holder in the 1 and 3-meter springboard, and in the prior two years had gone undefeated in both YMCA competition and dual meets. The "Y" team had won two YMCA national titles by April, 1957 and were attempting their third consecutive win, with Gompf having scored well in the 1956 meet. Gompf represented the Cincinnati Coca Cola Club at the National Junior Championship in 1957, where he placed first in the Platform and 3-meter competitions that August.

== Ohio State University ==
He enrolled and swam for Ohio State University around the Fall of 1957, where he placed second in the springboard at both the NCAAs and AAU championship meet in his senior year. He was also an NCAA champion on the trampoline at the NCAA Gymnastics Championship in his Senior year. At Ohio State, he competed in diving for Hall of Fame swim and dive Coach Mike Peppe. He was a Varsity letter winner at Ohio State from 1959-1961, in both diving and gymnastics, and a national runner up in three-meter diving in 1959. He helped lead Ohio State to a national runner-up finish in 1959.

== 1964 Tokyo Olympics ==
He represented the United States at the 1964 Summer Olympics in Tokyo, where he received a bronze medal in the men's 10 metre platform. Defending champion for the 10-meter platform, Bob Webster stood in only 6th place in the event after the seventh dive, but did well enough in the last three dives to win his second consecutive Olympic gold medal. Gompf was a Navy pilot holding the rank of Lieutenant during the 1964 Olympics.

In one of is final achievements as an athlete, Gompf was the World Professional High Diving Championship in 1970 and 1971.

== Post diving careers ==
Trained as a Navy pilot in the 1960's, Gompf served as a lieutenant in the U.S. Air Force, flying C-130 cargo planes in Vietnam. He later became a commercial pilot for Delta, Pan Am, and National Airlines, serving as a career pilot for 30 years. He was a judge at the Munich Olympics in 1972. He acted as manager of the USA Olympic diving team in 1976 and 1984, and was a diving official at the 1979 Pan-Am Games and the 1988 Olympics.

After retiring from dive competition, Gompf continued his interest in diving, serving as coach of the diving teams at the University of Miami from 1971-82, where he mentored 28 All American divers, including national and Olympic champion Greg Louganis, four-time national champion Melissa Briley, as well as Matt Gribble and David Wilkie.

Gompf served as the chairperson of the Olympic/International Committee for U.S. Diving from 1980-84, was President of U.S. Diving from 1986-90, and was the Chairman of the F.I.N.A International Diving Committee in 1988. He was president of U.S. Aquatic Sports from 1999 through 2002. Gompf promoted the sport of synchronized diving and is considered a pioneer in adding synchronized diving to many competitions.

His memoir, A Life Aloft was published by CG Sports Publishing in November 2021.

=== Honors ===
In 2002, Gompf became a member of the International Swimming Hall of Fame. In 2010 the US Olympic Committee presented him with the George M. Steinbrenner III Sport Leadership Award, honoring “a member of the Olympic family,” who had achieved an outstanding service record. He was also a member of the Athletic Halls of Fame at both Ohio State and the University of Miami, where he coached.

== See also ==
- List of members of the International Swimming Hall of Fame
