= Diving at the 1972 Summer Olympics – Women's 10 metre platform =

Women's 10 metre platform at the Games of the XX Olympiad

Medalists
1st place, gold medalist(s)		Ulrika Knape-Lindbergh	Sweden
2nd place, silver medalist(s)		Milena Duchková	Czechoslovakia
3rd place, bronze medalist(s)		Marina Janicke	East Germany

The women's 10 metre platform, also reported as platform diving, was one of four diving events on the Diving at the 1972 Summer Olympics programme.

The competition was split into two phases:

1. Preliminary round (1 September)
  Divers performed five dives. The twelve divers with the highest scores advanced to the final.
2. Final (2 September)
  Divers performed three voluntary dives without limit of degrees of difficulty. The final ranking was determined by the combined score with the preliminary round.

== Results ==
Rank	Diver	Nation	Preliminary		Final		
Rank	Diver	Nation	Points	Rank	Points	Rank	Total
1st place, gold medalist(s)	Ulrika Knape-Lindbergh	Sweden	218.31	2	171.69	1	390.00
2nd place, silver medalist(s)	Milena Duchková	Czechoslovakia	225.00	1	145.92	4	370.92
3rd place, bronze medalist(s)	Marina Janicke	East Germany	206.73	3	153.81	2	360.54
4	Janet Ely	United States	204.33	6	148.35	3	352.68
5	Micki King	United States	205.08	5	141.30	5	346.38
6	Sylvia Fiedler	East Germany	206.07	4	135.60	8	341.67
7	Nancy Robertson	Canada	196.26	7	137.76	6	334.02
8	Ingeborg Pertmayr	Austria	185.19	12	135.84	7	321.03
9	Kathleen Rollo	Canada	187.62	11	129.69	9	317.31
10	Alla Selina	Soviet Union	188.13	9	126.63	10	314.76
11	Elzbieta Wierniuk	Poland	188.10	10	121.98	11	310.08
12	Beverly Williams	Great Britain	188.58	8	112.68	12	301.26
13	Nataliya Kuznetsova-Lobanova	Soviet Union	184.02	13	did not advance		
14	Beverly Boys	Canada	183.99	14	did not advance		
15	Maxie Michael	West Germany	183.48	15	did not advance		
16	Melania Decuseara	Romania	182.82	16	did not advance		
17	Regina Krajnow	Poland	179.79	17	did not advance		
18	Helen Koppell	Great Britain	178.17	18	did not advance		
19	Tatyana Shtyreva	Soviet Union	177.33	19	did not advance		
20	Bertha Baraldi	Mexico	174.21	20	did not advance		
21	Cynthia Potter	United States	173.82	21	did not advance		
22	Laura Kivelä	Finland	172.65	22	did not advance		
23	Keiko Otsubo-Osaki	Japan	168.24	23	did not advance		
24	Ursula Sapp-Möckel	West Germany	162.39	24	did not advance		
25	Carmen Belén Núñez	Spain	157.95	25	did not advance		
26	Glenise-Ann Jones	Australia	157.20	26	did not advance		
27	Annita Smith	Netherlands	156.99	27	did not advance		

== Sources ==
- Organising Committee for the Games of the XX Olympiad (1974). The Official Report for the Games of the XX Olympiad Munich 1972 (PDF). Vol. 3: The competitions. proSport GmbH & Co, KG, München. p. 352.
