= Diving at the 1972 Summer Olympics – Women's 3 metre springboard =

Women's 3 metre springboard at the Games of the XX Olympiad
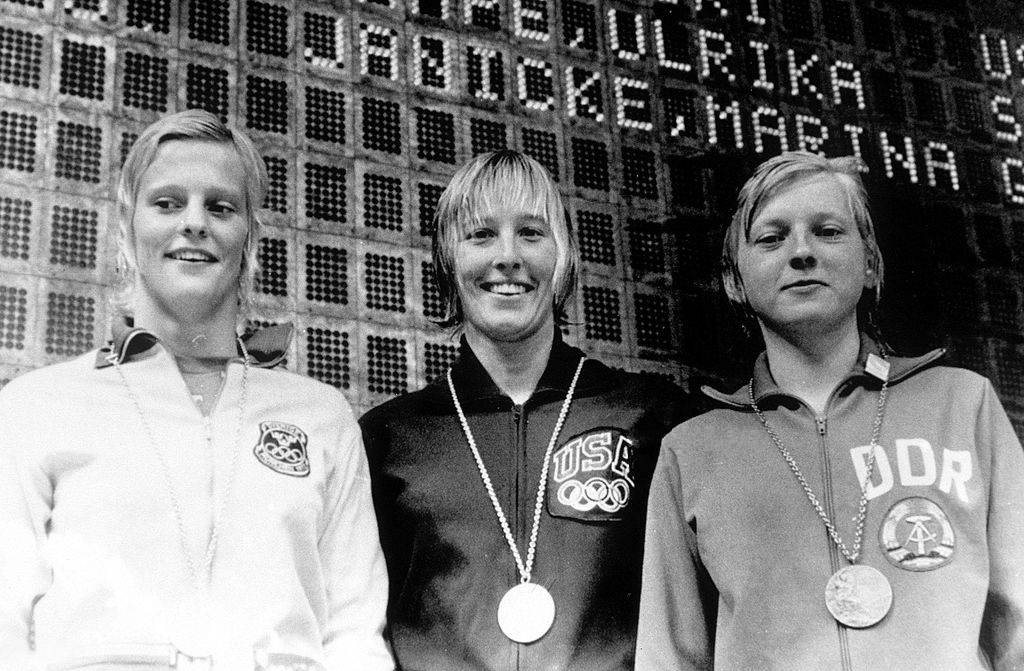
- Left-right: Knape, King, Janicke

Medalists
1st place, gold medalist(s)		Micki King	United States
2nd place, silver medalist(s)		Ulrika Knape	Sweden
3rd place, bronze medalist(s)		Marina Janicke	East Germany

The women's 3 metre springboard, also reported as springboard diving, was one of four diving events on the Diving at the 1972 Summer Olympics programme.

The competition was split into two phases:

1. Preliminary round (27 August)
  Divers performed seven dives. The twelve divers with the highest scores advanced to the final.
2. Final (28 August)
  Divers performed three voluntary dives without limit of degrees of difficulty. The final ranking was determined by the combined score with the preliminary round.

== Results ==
Rank	Diver	Nation	Preliminary		Final		
Rank	Diver	Nation	Points	Rank	Points	Rank	Total
1st place, gold medalist(s)	Micki King	United States	289.14	3	160.89	1	450.03
2nd place, silver medalist(s)	Ulrika Knape	Sweden	292.59	1	141.60	6	434.19
3rd place, bronze medalist(s)	Marina Janicke	East Germany	273.48	8	157.44	2	430.92
4	Janet Ely	United States	269.91	9	151.08	3	420.99
5	Beverly Boys	Canada	274.35	7	144.54	5	418.89
6	Agneta Henriksson	Sweden	290.79	2	126.69	9	417.48
7	Cynthia Potter	United States	264.90	10	148.68	4	413.58
8	Elzbieta Wierniuk	Poland	277.32	6	131.04	8	408.36
9	Heidi Becker-Ramlow	East Germany	281.58	4	124.20	10	405.78
10	Milena Duchková	Czechoslovakia	263.55	11	137.28	7	400.83
11	Christa Köhler	East Germany	278.88	5	115.32	12	394.20
12	Alison Drake	Great Britain	262.32	12	115.86	11	378.18
13	Michaela Herweck	West Germany	261.78	13	did not advance		
14	Nataliya Kuznetsova-Lobanova	Soviet Union	258.45	14	did not advance		
15	Bertha Baraldi	Mexico	252.66	15	did not advance		
16	Tetiana Shtyreva-Volynkina	Soviet Union	252.42	16	did not advance		
17	Tamara Fedosova-Pogosheva	Soviet Union	252.09	17	did not advance		
18	Regina Krajnow	Poland	248.91	18	did not advance		
19	Teri York	Canada	247.14	19	did not advance		
20	Elizabeth Carruthers	Canada	243.84	20	did not advance		
21	Sorana Prelipceanu	Romania	242.61	21	did not advance		
22	Helen Koppell	Great Britain	242.22	22	did not advance		
23	Mariette Dommers	Netherlands	239.40	23	did not advance		
24	Laura Kivelä	Finland	236.25	24	did not advance		
24	Taeko Kubo	Japan	236.25	24	did not advance		
26	Glenise-Ann Jones	Australia	232.44	26	did not advance		
27	Melania Decuseară	Romania	232.02	27	did not advance		
28	Christiane Wiles	France	229.56	28	did not advance		
29	Betsy Sullivan	Jamaica	210.39	29	did not advance		
30	Mirnawati Hardjolukito	Indonesia	188.94	30	did not advance		

== Sources ==
- Diving at the 1972 München Summer Games: Women's Springboard. sports-reference.com
- Organising Committee for the Games of the XX Olympiad (1974). The Official Report for the Games of the XX Olympiad Munich 1972 (PDF). Vol. 3: The competitions. proSport GmbH & Co, KG, München. p. 351.
