= Diving at the 1976 Summer Olympics – Women's 3 metre springboard =

Women's 3 metre springboard at the Games of the XXI Olympiad
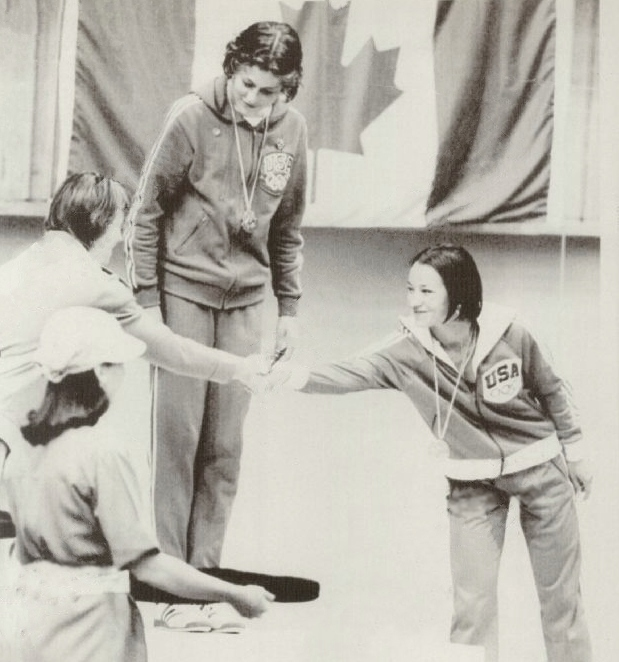
- Left-right: Köhler, Chandler, Potter

Medalists
1st place, gold medalist(s)		Jennifer Chandler	United States
2nd place, silver medalist(s)		Christa Köhler	East Germany
3rd place, bronze medalist(s)		Cynthia Potter	United States

The women's 3 metre springboard, also reported as springboard diving, was one of four diving events on the Diving at the 1976 Summer Olympics programme.

The competition was split into two phases:

1. Preliminary round (19 July)
  Divers performed ten dives. The eight divers with the highest scores advanced to the final.
2. Final (20 July)
  Divers performed another set of ten dives and the score here obtained determined the final ranking.

== Results ==
Rank	Diver	Nation	Preliminary		Final
Rank	Diver	Nation	Points	Rank	Points
1st place, gold medalist(s)	Jennifer Chandler	United States	463.32	1	506.19
2nd place, silver medalist(s)	Christa Köhler	East Germany	441.90	6	469.41
3rd place, bronze medalist(s)	Cynthia Potter	United States	455.16	3	466.83
4	Heidi Ramlow-Becker	East Germany	445.08	5	462.15
5	Karin Guthke	East Germany	441.03	7	459.81
6	Olga Dmitriyeva	Soviet Union	447.33	4	432.24
7	Irina Kalinina	Soviet Union	434.28	8	417.99
8	Barbara Nejman	United States	455.49	2	365.07
9	Beverly Boys	Canada	420.57	9	Did not advance
10	Ursula Sapp	West Germany	417.63	10	Did not advance
11	Ulrika Knape-Lindbergh	Sweden	416.94	11	Did not advance
12	Agneta Henriksson	Sweden	404.19	12	Did not advance
13	Helen Koppell	Great Britain	396.96	13	Did not advance
14	Teri York	Canada	393.36	14	Did not advance
15	Madeleine Barnett	Australia	391.77	15	Did not advance
16	Tatyana Podmaryova	Soviet Union	387.39	16	Did not advance
17	Eniko Kiefer	Canada	383.13	17	Did not advance
18	Rikiko Yamanaka	Japan	381.96	18	Did not advance
19	Renate Piotraschke	West Germany	377.49	19	Did not advance
20	Susanne Wetteskog	Sweden	369.15	20	Did not advance
21	Rebecca Ewert	New Zealand	352.62	21	Did not advance
22	Elizabeth Jack	Australia	348.54	22	Did not advance
23	Norma Baraldi	Mexico	336.12	23	Did not advance
24	Fusako Kakumaru	Japan	330.54	24	Did not advance
25	Carmen-Belen Nuñez	Spain	318.66	25	Did not advance
26	Aura Di Nasio	Venezuela	293.04	26	Did not advance
27	Peri Suzan Özkum	Turkey	274.44	27	Did not advance

== Sources ==
- Diving at the 1976 Montréal Summer Games: Women's Springboard. sports-reference.com
- The Official Report for the Games of the XXIst Olympiad Montréal 1976 – Volume 3: Results (pdf). Ottawa: Organizing Committee for the Games of the XXIst Olympiad, Montréal 1976 (COJO 76). 1978. pp. p. 463.
