= Clark Gayton =

American musician and composer

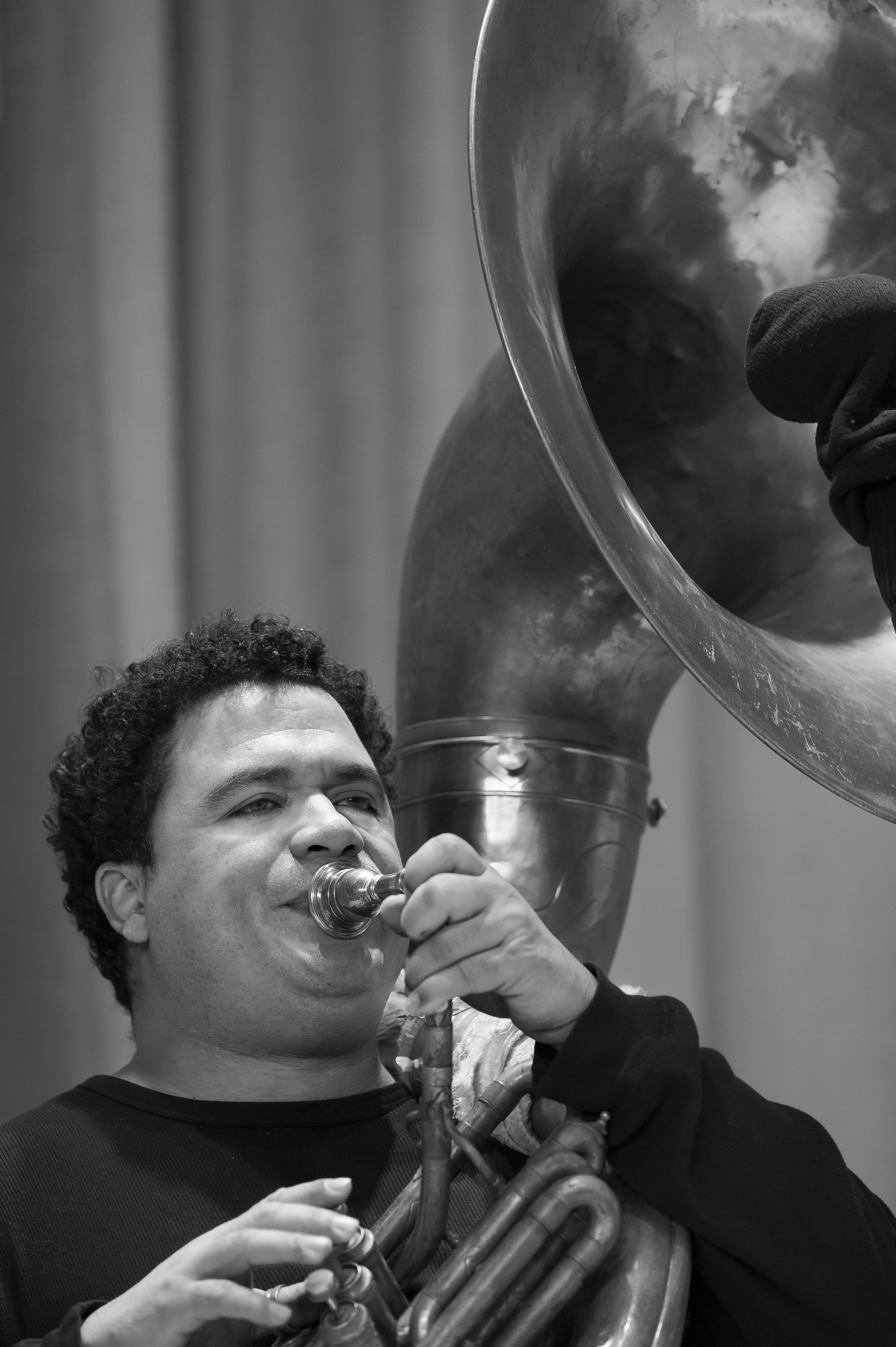
Clark Gayton, Buffalo, NY, 2009

Clark Gayton is an American multi-instrumentalist, musician, and composer.

== Biography ==
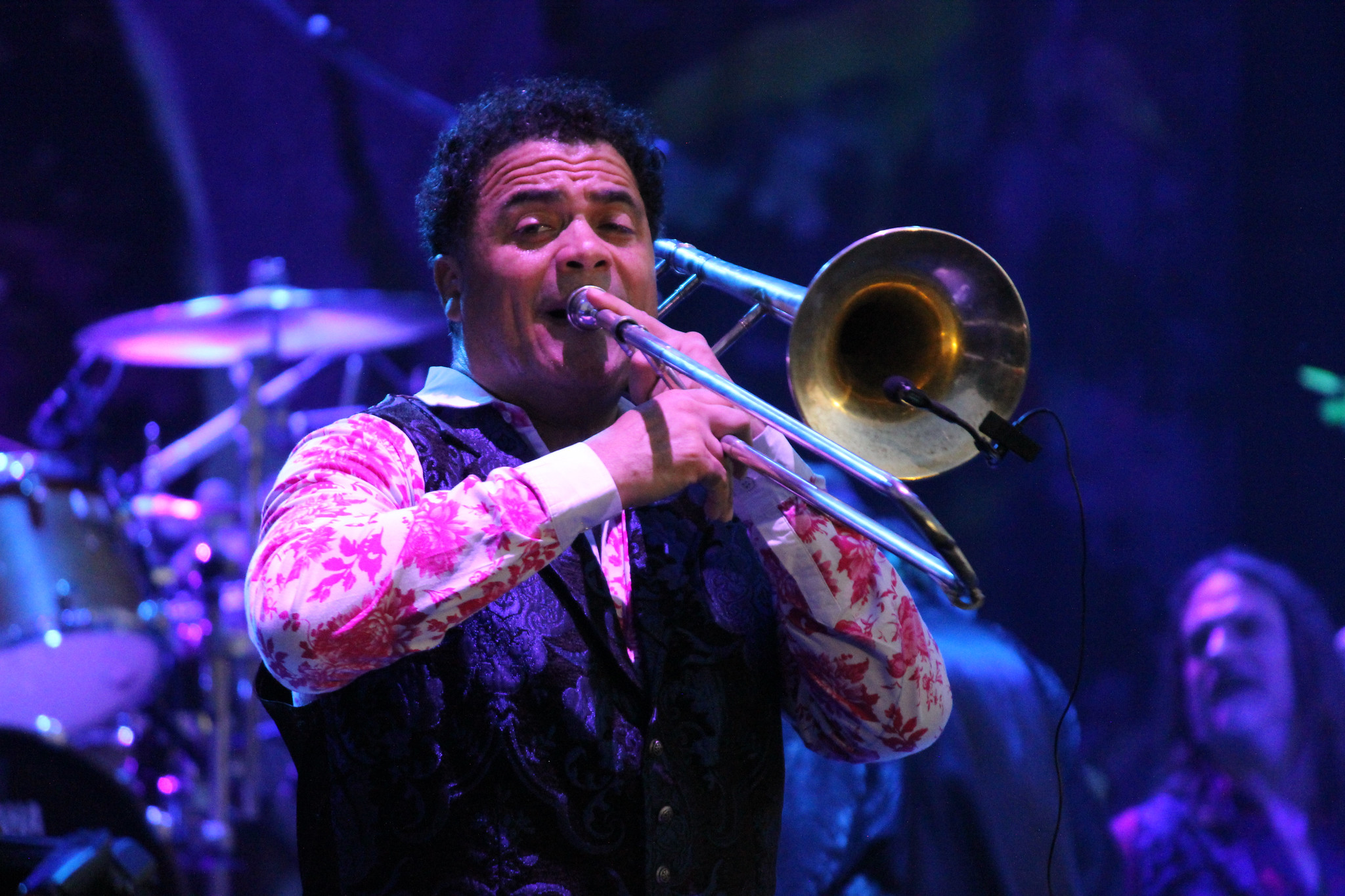
Clark Gayton playing trombone

Born as Carver Clark Gayton Jr. to Carver Clark Gayton and Mona Marie Lombard, Clark Gayton is a professional musician (trombone, euphonium, tuba, sousaphone, cornet, keyboards, piano), composer and producer.

Clark studied music with Floyd Standifer, JoAnn Christen, Curry Morrison, Julian Priester, Joe Brazil and Buddy Catlet while attending Garfield High School. After graduating from high school in 1981, Clark received a scholarship to attend the Berklee College of Music, where he studied with Phil Wilson, Tom Plsek and Tony Lada. He graduated in 1984 and moved to Oakland before moving to New York in 1987 where he lives to this day.

Since living in New York, Clark has worked and recorded with some of the finest jazz musicians in the world, such as Charles Tolliver, Lionel Hampton, Wynton Marsalis and JALC, McCoy Tyner, The Duke Ellington Orchestra, the Mingus Big Band, Ted Nash and Odeon, Ben Allison & Medicine Wheel, Michael Blake, Brian Mitchell, Steven Bernstein's Millennial Territory Orchestra and Steven Bernstein/Henry Butler and the Hot 9, the Carnegie Hall Jazz Band, the Count Basie Orchestra, Clark Terry, Nancy Wilson, and Ray Charles.

In the early 2000s he joined the Levon Helm Band and performed at Helm's Midnight Ramblers concerts.

For several decades Gayton has toured and recorded toured with Bruce Springsteen, joining in 1997 as part of the We Shall Overcome: The Seeger Sessions band. He rejoined Springsteen several years later as a regular member of his touring band, playing both trombone and sousaphone.

Clark has recorded or performed with Prince, Rihanna, Brazilian Girls, Steel Pulse, Wyclef Jean, Queen Latifah, Quincy Jones, Sting, Sturgill Simpson, Whitney Houston, Stevie Wonder, Bruno Mars, Bette Midler, Nora Jones, Usher, Steve Van Zandt, Beyoncé, Santana, Maxwell, The Skatalites, and Bad Brains, to name a few.

Gayton is a staple on the New York City music scene often creating a regular series at local bars and clubs including the Parkside Lounge, 55Bar, Bar Lunatico and Nublu. While he has led several bands, most notable is the Jamaican music inspired project Explorations in Dub.

Gayton has appeared in the movies Malcolm X, Sweet and Lowdown, and Kansas City.

Gayton's most recent TV work was playing in the burlesque band on the series The Marvelous Mrs. Maisel seasons 4 and 5.

It was reported in March 2023 that Gayton had recently suffered a very serious stroke. A GoFundMe page was set up to help raise money for his rehabilitation.

== Family influence and early music history ==
He is the son of Carver Clark Gayton and Mona Marie Lombard and is the great-grandnephew of the legendary New Orleans musician, Manuel "Fess" Manetta.

The first two professionally trained musicians on his maternal side were Jules and Deuce Manetta who founded the Pickwick Brass Band and played cornet and trombone, respectively. Deuce, trained classically in France, was said to be the first slide trombone player in New Orleans. Valve trombone was the instrument of choice at the time. Their nephew was Manuel Manetta. He began on violin and guitar but did his first paid work as a pianist for Countess Willie Piazza. He played with Buddy Bolden in 1903. By 1910 he had mastered cornet, saxophone, and trombone. Manuel played at Tuxedo Hall with the Eagle band. He went to Chicago in 1913, then returned to New Orleans, played locally for five years. He went to Los Angeles in November 1919 to join Kid Ory. He returned home shortly afterwards and toured as pianist for with Martels' Family Band, then played piano in Ed Allen's Band on riverboats. He settled down in New Orleans where his versatility and musicianship enabled him to work with many bands and orchestras, including Papa Celestin's, Arnold Du Pas and Manual Perez's, and solo work at Lulu White's.

In later years he became the most renowned teacher in New Orleans. He gave occasional public appearances well into his seventies, making a specialty of playing two brass instruments simultaneously. Manuel had a sister, Olivia, who had a son, Lawrence (trombone), and three daughters: Lucille (Clark's grandmother, piano), Dolly (Adams, played all instruments, mother of Justin, Placide, and Gerry Adams), and Gladys (piano). All were born in Algiers.

== Discography ==
- Clark Gayton & Neatherealm – Don't Try To Question 1995 (Ritual, Ltd.)
- Neatherealm – JahMerican Jazz (Ritual, Ltd.)
- Clark Gayton – Walk the Water 1999 (Ritual, Ltd.)
- Clark Gayton – Sankofa! 2003 (Ritual, Ltd.)
- Clark Gayton – Best of Clark Gayton 2008 (Ritual, Ltd.)
- Clark and the SuperSlicks- "New York" 2013 (Ritual, LTD)

=== As sideman ===
- Steel Pulse Rastafarian Centennial (trombone, vocals) 1992
- SkadanksGive Thanks 1994 (trombone)
- Mingus Big Band Que Viva Mingus 1997
- Dr. John Anotha Zone 1998 (trombone)
- Cornell Campbell Big Things (Trombone) 2000
- Peter Salett Heart of Mine (Trombone) 2000
- Dennis Brown Let Me Be the One (Trombone) 2000
- George Gruntz Concert Jazz Band Merryteria (Trombone) 2000
- Monday Michiru 4 Seasons (Trombone, Tuba) 2001
- Sting All This Time (Trombone) 2001
- Maxwell Now (Trombone) 2001
- Barney McAll Release the Day (Trombone) 2001
- Monday Michiru Selections 1997–2000 (Trombone, Tuba) 2001
- Jephte Guillaume Bourique Le 2001
- Paul Peress Awakening (Trombone, Horn Arrangements) 2002
- Jah Works Bassmentality (Trombone) 2002
- Dave Stryker Blue to the Bone III (Trombone) 2002
- Tom Jones Mr. Jones (Trombone) 2002
- Bill Mobley and the Space Time Big Band New Light (Trombone, Soloist) 2002
- John Fedchock New York Big Band No Nonsense (Trombone) 2002
- Queen Latifah She's a Queen: A Collection of Hits (Trombone, Horn Arrangements) 2002
- Tom Browne Tom Browne Collection (Trombone) 2002
- Gaijin à Go-Go Happy–55–Lucky (Trombone) 2003
- Dan Zanes and Friends House Party (Tuba) 2003
- Julia Darling Julia Darling (Trombone, Trombonium) 2003
- Cannabis Cup Band Live Joint (Trombone) 2003
- Mýa Moodring (Trombone) 2003
- Sting Sacred Love (Trombone) 2003
- Barbershop 2: Back in Business Original Soundtrack (Trombone) 2004
- Ben Allison & Medicine Wheel Buzz (Trombone, Bass Trombone) 2004
- Mocean Worker Enter the Mowo! (Trombone) 2004
- David Pilgrim Island Soul (Trombone) 2004
- Brazilian Girls Lazy Lover [EP] (Composer, Trombone, Vocals (background)) 2004
- Nasio Living in the Positive [Bonus Tracks] (Trombone) 2004
- Brazilian Girls Brazilian Girls (Composer, Trombone, Vocals (background)) 2005
- Ted Nash – Espada de la Noche (Trombone, Tuba, Horn (Baritone)) 2005
- JJ Sansaverino Sunshine After Midnight (Trombone) 2005
- Elvis Costello North (trombone) 2005
- Kerry Linder Sail Away With Me (Trombone) 2005
- Steven Bernstein MTO Vol. 1 (Trombone) 2006
- Brazilian Girls Talk to La Bomb 2006
- Joss Stone "It's a Man's World", Live (Trombone) 2006
- Rihanna A Girl Like Me (Trombone) 2006
- Charles Tolliver With Love (Trombone) 2006
- Nasio Fontaine Rise Up (Trombone) 2007
- Duo Live The Color of Money (Trombone) 2007
- Bad Brains Build a Nation (Trumpet) 2007
- Bruce Springsteen Live in Dublin (Trombone, vocals) 2007
- East Village Opera Company Olde School (Trombone) 2008
- Brazilian Girls New York City (Tuba) 2008
- Lila Downs – Shake Away (Trombone, valve trombone, tuba) 2008
- Dispatch Live Zimbabwe (Trombone) 2008
- Bruce Springsteen Wrecking Ball 2012
- Glen Hansard Rhythm and Repose 2012
- Sturgil Simpson A Sailor's Guide to Earth 2014
- Bruce Springsteen Live in Leipzig (Trombone, vocals) 2013
- Lucio Kropf Pela Rua (Trombone) 2015
- Bruce Springsteen Western Stars (Trombone) 2019
- Steve Slagle Nascentia 2021
- Michael Blake Combobulate (Trombone) 2022
