= Diving at the 1976 Summer Olympics – Women's 10 metre platform =

Women's 10 metre platform at the Games of the XXI Olympiad

Medalists
1st place, gold medalist(s)		Elena Vaytsekhovskaya	Soviet Union
2nd place, silver medalist(s)		Ulrika Knape	Sweden
3rd place, bronze medalist(s)		Deborah Wilson	United States

The women's 10 metre platform, also reported as platform diving, was one of four diving events on the Diving at the 1976 Summer Olympics programme.

The competition was split into two phases:

1. Preliminary round (24 July)
  Divers performed eight dives. The eight divers with the highest scores advanced to the final.
2. Final (25 July)
  Divers performed another set of eight dives and the score here obtained determined the final ranking.

== Results ==
Rank	Diver	Nation	Preliminary		Final
Rank	Diver	Nation	Points	Rank	Points
1st place, gold medalist(s)	Elena Vaytsekhovskaya	Soviet Union	370.05	6	406.59
2nd place, silver medalist(s)	Ulrika Knape	Sweden	410.40	1	402.60
3rd place, bronze medalist(s)	Deborah Wilson	United States	398.37	3	401.07
4	Irina Kalinina	Soviet Union	408.63	2	398.67
5	Cindy Shatto	Canada	382.68	5	389.58
6	Teri York	Canada	356.28	8	378.39
7	Melissa Briley	United States	389.85	4	376.86
8	Heidi Ramlow-Becker	East Germany	362.37	7	365.64
9	Janet Ely	United States	343.92	9	Did not advance
10	Rikiko Yamanaka	Japan	340.32	10	Did not advance
11	Karin Guthke	East Germany	339.00	11	Did not advance
12	Tatyana Volynkina-Shtyreva	Soviet Union	333.33	12	Did not advance
13	Déborah Weil	Mexico	332.70	13	Did not advance
14	Tammy MacLeod	Canada	332.07	14	Did not advance
15	Fusako Kakumaru	Japan	328.68	15	Did not advance
16	Renate Piotraschke	West Germany	328.62	16	Did not advance
17	Ursula Sapp	West Germany	327.24	17	Did not advance
18	Madeleine Barnett	Australia	323.67	18	Did not advance
19	Carmen Casteiner	Italy	318.30	19	Did not advance
20	Elizabeth Jack	Australia	312.18	20	Did not advance
21	Kerstin Krause	East Germany	305.46	21	Did not advance
22	Milena Duchková	Czechoslovakia	300.63	22	Did not advance
23	Susanne Wetteskog	Sweden	299.46	23	Did not advance
24	Brigitte Duda	Austria	292.41	24	Did not advance
25	Norma Baraldi	Mexico	278.31	25	Did not advance
–	Conchita Garcia	Spain	DNS	–	Did not advance

== Sources ==
- The Official Report for the Games of the XXIst Olympiad Montréal 1976 - Volume 3: Results (pdf). Ottawa: Organizing Committee for the Games of the XXIst Olympiad, Montréal 1976 (COJO 76). 1978. pp. p. 465.
