= Taeko =

Taeko is a Japanese female given name. It can have various meanings depending on the kanji used. Possible written forms include:

妙子 "mysterious child" 多恵子 "many blessings, child"

== People ==
- Taeko Fukao, Japanese jazz singer
- Taeko Hattori (b. 1949), Japanese stage, film, and television actress
- Taeko Ishikawa (b. 1975), Japanese softball player
- Taeko Kawata (b. 1965), Japanese voice actress
- Taeko Kono (1926–2015), Japanese novelist and essayist
- Taeko Kubo (b. 1949), Japanese diver
- Taeko Kunishima, Japanese jazz pianist
- Taeko Kuwata (b. 1945), half of the classical piano duo Duo Crommelynck
- Taeko Nakanishi (b. 1931), Japanese voice actress
- Taeko Namba, Japanese table tennis player
- Taeko Nishino (b. 1975), Japanese singer and actress
- Taeko Onuki (b. 1953), Japanese singer
- Taeko Oyama (b. 1974), Japanese basketball player
- Taeko Takeba (b. 1966), Japanese trap shooter
- Taeko Todo (b. 1968), Chinese-born table tennis
- Taeko Tomioka (b. 1935), Japanese writer
- Tomiyama Taeko (1921–2021), Japanese visual artist and writer
- Taeko Udagawa (b. 1960), Japanese anthropologist
- Taeko Watanabe (b. 1960), Japanese manga artist

=== Fictional ===
- Makioka Taeko in The Makioka Sisters by Jun'ichirō Tanizaki
- Taeko, the main character in the 1991 Studio Ghibli film Only Yesterday
- Taeko Hiramatsu, a character in the light novel series Is This a Zombie?
- Taeko Minazuki, a character in the series Ai Yori Aoshi
- Taeko Ishiki, captain of Nadeshiko Japan in Area no Kishi
- Taeko Yasuhiro, a.k.a. Celestia Ludenberg, a student in Danganronpa: Trigger Happy Havoc
- Taeko Nomura, one of the main characters in the manga and anime Coppelion
- Taeko Yamada, a female version of Taro Yamada in Yandere Simulator
