= Nasio =

Nasio can be a masculine given name or a surname. Notable people with the name include:

- Nasio Fontaine, Dominican singer
- Aura Di Nasio, Venezuelan diver
- Juan-David Nasio (born 1942), French psychoanalyst
- Willie Nasio, New Zealand boxer
