= Barbara Nejman =

American diver

Personal information
- Born: December 22, 1950 (age 74); Alton, Illinois, United States

Sport
- Sport: Diving

Barbara Nejman (born December 22, 1950) is an American diver. She competed in the women's 3 metre springboard event at the 1976 Summer Olympics.

== Career ==
Nejman began diving around the age of eight in southern Illinois. She was coached by Don Leas, who also coached several All-Americans at Clarion State College, from where Nejman graduated. At the age of 12, she unsuccessfully tried for the 1964 Summer Olympics and again for the 1968 Summer Olympics. During trials for the 1972 Summer Olympics, she was edged out by Micki King, yet succeeded in the 1976 Summer Olympics trials, finishing third behind Jennifer Chandler and Cynthia McIngvale. Following the Olympics, she won titles in the AAU Senior Diving Championships and won the American Cup Championship.

After an 18-year hiatus from the early 1980s, she began diving again in the late 1990s and by 1999, had already won five gold medals, including three in 1999 from the grand masters division. She served as a diving consultant in eight western states and was an active campaigner to improve diving facilities in Phoenix, Arizona.

Outside of diving, Nejman taught history and geography at Xavier, as well as being the school's swimming and diving coach throughout the entirety of the 1990s.

== Personal ==
Nejman is married to husband Thomas since around 1974, who graduated from Clarion State College a year prior to her.
