= Udagawa =

Udagawa (written: 宇田川 or 宇多川) is a Japanese surname. Notable people with the surname include:

- Hideko Udagawa, Japanese classical violinist
- Hiroshi Udagawa (宇田川 洋; born 1944), Japanese archaeologist and anthropologist
- Taeko Udagawa, Japanese anthropologist
- Udagawa Katsutarō (宇多川 勝太郎; 1939–1989), Japanese sumo wrestler
- Udagawa Yōan (宇田川 榕菴; 1798–1846), Japanese scholar of Western studies

== Fictional characters ==
- Ako Udagawa (宇田川 あこ), a character in the media franchise BanG Dream!
- Tomoe Udagawa (宇田川 巴), a character in the media franchise BanG Dream!

== See also ==
- 4632 Udagawa, a main-belt asteroid
