= Anthony Korf =

American composer, artistic director and conductor

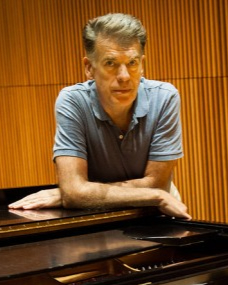
Anthony Korf

Anthony Korf (born 1951 in New York City) is an American composer, artistic director and conductor. While his output spans vocal and chamber music, his primary focus has been the orchestra, among which Goldkind, a work for young audiences written in collaboration with Sabina Sciubba (Brazilian Girls), three symphonies, a piano concerto and a requiem, the latter commissioned and premiered by The San Francisco Symphony, figure most prominently. Other commissions include The American Composers Orchestra, The Koussevitzky Music Foundation, The Howard Hanson Fund, and The National Endowment for the Arts.

Korf currently serves as Artistic Director and Composer-in-Residence for Riverside Symphony (New York City), a professional orchestra he co-founded with the conductor George Rothman in 1981. In 1974 Korf founded Parnassus, a New York-based contemporary music ensemble which he led as conductor and Artistic Director for 27 seasons. The ensemble performed an annual Manhattan-based series, concertized in the Northeast, and recorded for CRI, New World and Koch International records.

== Life ==
Korf was born in New York City and has lived there ever since, excepting an interval in Los Angeles from ages five through 17. He earned his Bachelor's and Master's degree in Performance (percussion) at Manhattan School of Music (MSM). While Korf studied timpani and percussion with Fred Hinger and James Preiss, he developed a strong interest in composing and conducting in his graduate years, inspired by Harvey Sollberger and Charles Wuorinen who led the conservatory student new music ensemble of which he was a member. This led to Korf’s formation of Parnassus upon graduation from MSM, the ensemble’s first project being a recording of Stravinsky’s Histoire du soldat for Music Minus One label.

The disbandment of Parnassus after 2001 allowed Korf to focus on composing and his curatorial, educational and other responsibilities with Riverside Symphony. He lives with his wife Colleen in New York City and in Columbia County, New York. His New York City-based son, Damon, is a songwriter, singer and instrumentalist and holds a degree in Classics from Bard College

== Awards ==
2014 Arts & Letters Award from the American Academy of Arts & Letters

Guggenheim Fellowship, 2008

Godard Lieberson Fellowship, American Academy, 1998

ASCAP Grants to Young Composers 1976

== Selected works ==
Concerto for Violin and Orchestra (2018)

Cantata (1992, rev. 2018)

The Two (for two guitars) (2015)

The Order in Which it Was Received for Double Bass and Piano (2013)

Combo (2011)

Goldkind for Narrator/Singer and Orchestra (2011)

El Diario for solo guitar (2011)

Trio for Violin, Cello and Piano (2010)

Symphony No. 3 (2007)

Duo for Clarinet and Piano (2003)

Concerto for Piano and Orchestra (2001)

Presences from Aforetime for Oboe/English Horn, cello, guitar harp and piano (1999)

Six Miniatures for Flute with Piano (1996)

Duo for Violin and Piano (1997)

The Living Daylights for Solo Trumpet (1992)

Three Movements for Solo Clarinet (1990)

Requiem (1989)

Nothing But Love Songs for Soprano and Chamber Ensembles (1998)

Symphony No. 2 (1987)

Symphony in the Twilight (1985)

A Farewell for Symphonic Winds (1981)

== Critical reception ==
Korf’s 2008 Bridge Records disc was selected among Fanfare Magazine’s 2009 “Want List” of Top Recordings. Writing in Fanfare, critic William Zagorski wrote: “Anthony Korf…works the traditional elements of musical composition in astonishing ways that result in a wholly original sound world. The music on this Bridge release is so cerebral as to become downright sensual, and so fastidiously constructed as to sound completely spontaneous.”

As conductor and artistic director, New York Times chief music critic Bernard Holland commented: “It is an oddity of the music business that Mr. Korf - who may never make it to the stages of the Concertgebouw or Musikvereinsaal - probably served music for this hour, before this audience of a few hundred, better than many of our better-known touring maestros during a career.

The New Yorker's Andrew Porter once wrote: “By Parnassus performances and Parnassus commissions, Korf has put New York and the musical world in his debt. He has gathered some of the most brilliant players in the country and forged them into an ensemble. He has championed composers whose works need virtuoso performance and has interpreted them with passion and precision.”
