= Arvi Pohjanpää =

Finnish gymnast, author and judge

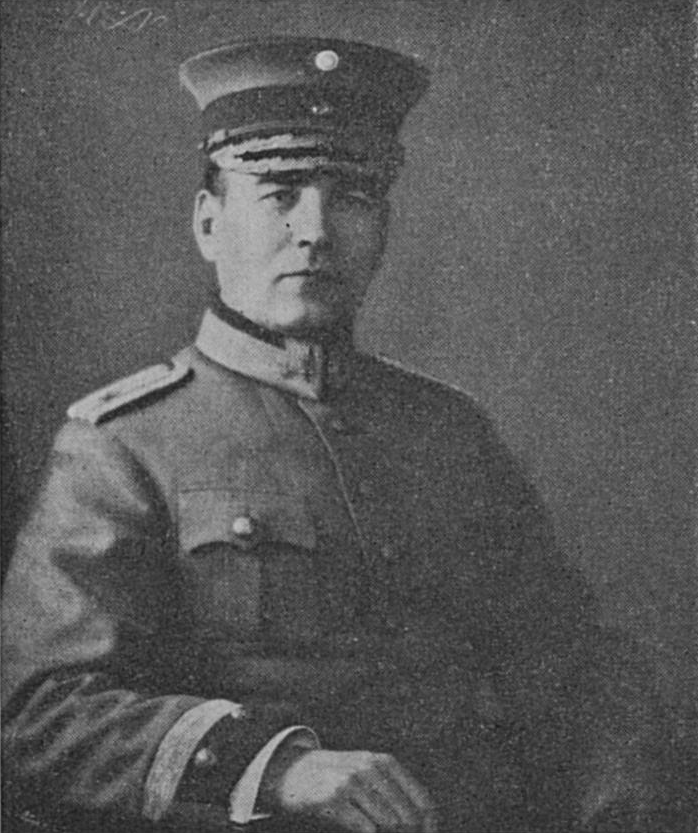
- Pohjanpää in 1937

Personal information
- Full name: Sulo Arvi Pohjanpää
- Alternative name: Sulo Arvi Nordqvist
- Born: 10 July 1887 Helsinki, Grand Duchy of Finland, Russian Empire
- Died: 21 December 1959 (aged 72) Helsinki, Finland
- Height: 185 cm (6 ft 1 in)
- Relatives: Lauri Pohjanpää (brother); Laura Kivelä (granddaughter)

Gymnastics career
- Discipline: Men's artistic gymnastics
- Country represented: Finland
- Club: Ylioppilasvoimistelijat
Medal record
Men's artistic gymnastics
Representing Finland
Olympic Games
Bronze medal – third place	1908 London	Team

Sulo Arvi Pohjanpää (10 July 1887 – 21 December 1959) was a Finnish Olympic gymnast, judge and writer.

== Gymnastics ==
Arvi Pohjanpää at the Olympic Games
Games	Event	Rank	Notes
1908 Summer Olympics	Men's team	3rd	Source:

He won the Finnish national championship in team gymnastics as a member of Ylioppilasvoimistelijat in 1909.

== Law ==
He took his matriculation exam in Tampere real lycaeum in 1905. He graduated as a Master of Laws from the University of Helsinki in 1910. He received the title varatuomari in 1913.

Beginning in 1911, he worked various duties in the legal system. Eventually, he was a judge advocate general in the superior court martial from 1931 to 1952 and then a Judge of the Court of Appeal in the Helsinki Court of Appeal from 1952 to 1954.

He sentenced Martta Koskinen, the last woman executed in Finland, to death as chief justice of the case. He was the chief justice in the case of Hella Wuolijoki. He voted for death, although she received life imprisonment. He sentenced Arndt Pekurinen to prison for his refusal to fight in the Winter War.

== Literature ==
He first published work was a short story collection Tuntureilta in 1913. His debut as a playwright, Vala, was premiered by the Finnish National Theatre in 1918. His play Jumalan käskynhaltija was adapted into film Jumalan tuomio in 1939.

He was the secretary of the Union of Finnish Writers in 1919–1920.

He used the pseudonym A.P:pää writing in newspapers.

== Accolades ==
He received the following honorary awards:

- Commemorative Medal of the Liberation War
- Commander of the White Rose of Finland, 1937
- Commemorative Medal of the Winter War
- Cross of Liberty, 3rd Class; 1940
- Cross of Liberty, 2nd Class; 1945
- Decoration for 40 years' faultless service, 1951

== Family ==
His parents were master tailor Kaarle Henrik Pohjanpää and Ida Vilhelmina Kourlaa. His first wife was Lempi Vilma Ranttila (1892–1947), married in 1922. They had children:

1. Eila Helena Marjatta (1924–)
2. Anja Meri Kristiina (1926–)
3. Armi Elina Annikki (1933–1996), who married Pentti Siimes

His second wife was Aila Tellervo Heikinheimo (1919–), married in 1953.

He finnicized his familyname from Nordqvist to Pohjanpää in 1906.

Poet Lauri Pohjanpää was his brother.

Olympic diver Laura Kivelä was his granddaughter.

He was buried in Finland at the Hietaniemi Cemetery.
