= Brazilian Girls (album) =

Studio album by Brazilian Girls
- Released: February 1, 2005
- Recorded: 2004–2005
- Genres: Electronic; pop
- Length: 53:13
- Label: Verve
- Producers: Frederik Rubens; Brazilian Girls

Brazilian Girls chronology
| Lazy Lover (2004) | Brazilian Girls (2005) | Talk to La Bomb (2006) |

Professional ratings
Review scores
| Source | Rating |
|---|---|
| AllMusic | link |
| Pitchfork | (7.3/10) link |
| Robert Christgau | link |
| Rolling Stone | link |

Brazilian Girls is the first album by the American music group Brazilian Girls. It was released on February 1, 2005 by Verve Records. The album mixes a number of different musical styles, from reggae to samba and house to acid jazz, as well as many different languages, as lead singer Sabina Sciubba goes from English to French, Italian, German and Spanish.

The song "Me gustas cuando callas" ("I like you when you're quiet") is based on a poem by Pablo Neruda, from his well-known 1924 collection Veinte poemas de amor y una canción desesperada, and "Die Gedanken sind frei" ("Thoughts Are Free") is a German protest song about the freedom of thought that became popular with the revolutions of 1848. The French song title "Les sirènes de la fête" means "the Sirens of the party."

== Track listing ==
1. "Homme" – 5:21
2. "Don't Stop" – 3:51
3. "Lazy Lover" – 4:00
4. "Les sirènes de la fête" – 4:46
5. "Corner Store" – 4:13
6. "Long" – 4:47
7. "Pussy" – 4:08
8. "Die Gedanken sind frei (Thoughts Are Free)" – 4:28
9. "All We Have" – 3:46
10. "Dance Till the Morning Sun" – 4:38
11. "Me gustas cuando callas" – 5:42
12. "Ships in the Night" – 3:29

== Personnel ==
- Sabina Sciubba - vocals
- Till Behler - saxophone
- Seamus Blake - saxophone, background vocals
- Takuya Nakamura - trumpet, background vocals
- Clark Gayton - trombone, tuba, background vocals
- Didi Gutman - keyboards, computers
- Jesse Murphy - bass
- Aaron Johnston - drums
- Brian Mitchell - background vocals
- Kenny Wollesen - background vocals
- Jason Darling - background vocals
- Anna Hronopoulos - background vocals
- Hector Castillo - background vocals
- Alexandra Douglass - background vocals
- Heather Blanton - background vocals
- Carlotta Montealegre - background vocals
- Shruthi Pinnamaneni - background vocals

== Reception ==
- Listed at #40 on Woxy.com's 97 best of 2005
- Listed as one of the best albums of 2005 on Artistdirect
