= Valentina Chumicheva =

Soviet diver (1931–2021)

Personal information
- Born: 10 August 1931 Moscow, Soviet Union
- Died: 3 January 2021 (aged 89) Moscow, Russia

Sport
- Sport: Diving
Medal record
Representing the Soviet Union
European Championships
Gold medal – first place	1954 Turin	Springboard
Bronze medal – third place	1958 Budapest	Springboard

Valentina Nikolayevna Chumicheva (Russian: Валентина Николаевна Чумичёва; 10 August 1931 – 3 January 2021) was a Soviet diver. She competed in the 3m springboard at the 1952 and 1956 Summer Olympics and finished in tenth and fifth place, respectively. She won this event at the 1954 European Aquatics Championships. After marriage, she changed her last name to Dedova (Russian: Дедова).

After retiring from competitive diving, she became the diving coach at CSKA. Among her students were Vyacheslav Strakhov and Elena Vaytsekhovskaya.
