= List of Légion d'honneur recipients by name (N) =

The French government gives out the Legion of Honour awards, to both French and foreign nationals, based on a recipient's exemplary services rendered to France, or to the causes supported by France. This award is divided into five distinct categories (in ascending order), i.e. three ranks: Knight, Officer, Commander, and two titles: Grand Officer and Grand Cross. Knight is the most common and is awarded for either at least 20 years of public service or acts of military or civil bravery. The rest of the categories have a quota for the number of years of service in the category below before they can be awarded. The Officer rank requires a minimum of eight years as a Knight, and the Commander, the highest civilian category for a non-French citizen, requires a minimum of five years as an Officer. The Grand Officer and the Grand Cross are awarded only to French citizens, and each requires three years' service in their respective immediately lower rank. The awards are traditionally published and promoted on 14 July.

The following is a non-exhaustive list of recipients of the Legion of Honour awards, since the first ceremony in May 1803. 2,550 individuals can be awarded the insignia every year. The total number of awards is close to 1 million (estimated at 900,000 in 2021, including over 3,000 Grand Cross recipients), with some 92,000 recipients alive today. Only until 2008 was gender parity achieved amongst the yearly list of recipients, with the total number of women recipients since the award's establishment being only 59 at the end of the second French empire and only 26,000 in 2021.

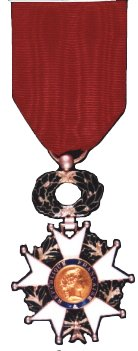

| Recipient | Dates (birth – death) | General work & reason for the recognition | Award category (date) |
|---|---|---|---|
| Claude Nahon | | | |
| Zdzislaw Najder | | | |
| Étienne de Nansouty | 1768 – 1815 | French general, commander of the Guard cavalry during the Napoleonic Wars | Commander (1804); Grand Officer (1805); Grand Eagle (1807) |
| Ehsan Naraghi | | | |
| Juan-David Nasio | | | |
| Arrmanatha Nasir (b. 1971), | | Indonesian ambassador to France. | TBA (2021) |
| Martin Dunbar-Nasmith | | | |
| Klaus Naumann | | | |
| Shahram Nazeri | 1950 | Iranian musician and singer | TBA (2007) |
| Philip Neame | | | |
| Wendell Cushing Neville | | | |
| Simon Newcomb | | | |
| Michel Ney | 1769 – 1815 | French general, Napoleonic Wars | |
| Prince Nicholas of Romania | | | |
| Erskine Arthur Nicolson | 1884 – 1982 | British peer (3rd Baron Carnock) and sailor. Recognised for World War I service in France. | Knight (15 September 1916) |
| Anna de Noailles | | | |
| Philippe Noiret | | | |
| Manuel Noriega | 1934 | | TBA (1987) |
| Lauris Norstad | | | |
| Richard Norton | | | |
| Pierre Notting | | | |
| William Nutley | | | |
| Steven Nzonzi | | World Cup winning footballer. | |

== See also ==
- Legion of Honour
- List of Legion of Honour recipients by name
- List of foreign recipients of Legion of Honour by name
- List of foreign recipients of the Legion of Honour by country
- List of British recipients of the Legion of Honour for the Crimean War
- Legion of Honour Museum
- Ribbons of the French military and civil awards
- War Cross (France)
