= Debbie Wilson =

Debbie Wilson may refer to:

- Debbie Wilson (cricketer) (born 1961), former Australian cricket player
- Debbie Wilson (90210), a character on the TV series 90210
- Debbie Wilson (Emmerdale), a fictional character on the ITV soap opera Emmerdale
- Debbie Wilson (1960–2011) a.k.a. Debbie Juvenile, prominent member of the early UK punk fan faction the Bromley Contingent, later a film set designer

== See also ==
- Deborah Wilson (born 1955), American former diver
- Debra Wilson (born 1962), American actress, comedian and television presenter
