= Tammy MacLeod =

Canadian diver

Personal information
- Nationality: Canadian
- Born: 3 August 1956 (age 69) Vancouver, British Columbia, Canada

Sport
- Sport: Diving

Tammy MacLeod (born 3 August 1956) is a Canadian diver. She competed in the women's 10 metre platform event at the 1976 Summer Olympics.

In February 1973, she won the Australian junior under-16s 1-metre and 3-metre diving events and was runner-up in the 10m-metre tower event. She was part of the Simon Fraser diving team.
