= Rebecca Ewert =

New Zealand diver (born 1955)

Personal information
- Born: 11 January 1955 (age 70); Auckland, New Zealand

Sport
- Sport: Diving

Una Rebecca Ewert (born 11 January 1955) is a former New Zealand diver. She represented her country at two Commonwealth games and she was the first New Zealand diver to attend an Olympics.

== Life ==
Ewert was born in Auckland. At the age of 15 she was selected to dive from three metres at the Commonwealth Games in Edinburgh in 1970. Four years later she was diving again from the one metre board at the next Commonwealth games in Christchurch.

Ewert was New Zealand's first Olympic diver when she participated at the 1976 Summer Olympics representing New Zealand. She was again diving from three metres and she was placed 21st.
