= Elizabeth Jack =

Australian diver

Personal information
- Full name: Elizabeth Hamilton Jack
- Born: 19 June 1958 (age 68) Launceston, Tasmania, Australia
- Height: 156 cm (5 ft 1 in)
- Weight: 47 kg (104 lb)

Sport
- Country: Australia
- Sport: Diving

Elizabeth Hamilton Jack (born 19 June 1958) is a former Australian diver, diving coach and sports administrator.

Jack competed at the 1976 Summer Olympics in Montreal in the 3 metre springboard event where she finished 22nd and in the 10 metre platform event where she finished 20th.

Following her retirement from competition, Jack moved to Canada in 1980 to coach the Canadian national diving team.

In 2005 Jack was inducted onto the Tasmanian Honour Roll of Women in recognition of her service to sport and recreation.

== Personal ==
Jack is the aunt Australian long-distance runner Milly Clark.
