= Christiane Wiles =

French diver

Personal information
- Nationality: French
- Born: 7 October 1952 (age 72)

Sport
- Sport: Diving

Christiane Wiles (born 7 October 1952) is a French diver. She competed in the women's 3 metre springboard event at the 1972 Summer Olympics.
