= Vyacheslav Strakhov =

Soviet diver

Personal information
- Born: 13 January 1950 Moscow, Soviet Union

Sport
- Sport: Diving
- Club: CSKA
- Coached by: Valentina Dedova
Medal record
Representing the Soviet Union
World Championships
Bronze medal – third place	1975 Cali	Springboard
European Championships
Bronze medal – third place	1974 Vienna	Springboard
Summer Universiade
Gold medal – first place	1973 Moscow	Springboard

Vyacheslav Strakhov (Russian: Вячеслав Страхов, born 13 January 1950) is a Soviet former diver who competed in the 1972 Summer Olympics and in the 1976 Summer Olympics.
