= Milly Clark =

Australian long-distance runner

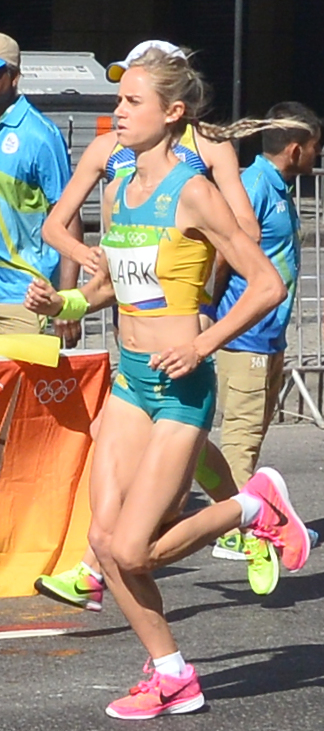
- Clark at the 2016 Olympics

Personal information
- Born: Amelia Jane Clark; 1 March 1989 (age 37)
- Education: Drake University, University of Sydney, University of Tasmania

Sport
- Country: Australia
- Sport: Track and field
- Events: Steeplechase, 10,000 m, half marathon, marathon

Achievements and titles
- Olympic finals: Rio De Janeiro, 2016
- Personal bests: 800m - 2:12.26 (2020) 1500m - 4:21.52 (2017) 3000m 9:08.33 (2017) 3000 m Steeplechase – 10:01.43 (2012); 5000m - 15:41.05 (2020); 10,000 m – 33:24.89 (2017) 10K - 33.16 (2020); Half Marathon – 1:10:48 (2016); Marathon – 2:26.58 (2021)

Milly Clark (born 1 March 1989) is an Australian long-distance runner. She ran her first official marathon in 2015 in Amsterdam where she placed third and qualified for the 2016 Rio Olympics. She placed 18th at the Olympics and was the first Australian runner to cross the line.

Clark won the Australian 3000m steeplechase title in 2012 and placed third in the Zatopek 10,000 meter championship in 2013. Clark first represented Australia at the World Half Marathon Championships in Cardiff in 2016, where she placed 13th in a personal best time of 1:10.48. Her personal best time for the marathon is currently 2:26.58, set at the Melbourne Marathon in 2021, a race which she won.

Clark's mother Margaret (née Jack) competed for Australia in gymnastics at the 1978 Commonwealth Games and the World Gymnastics Championships in 1979. Her aunt Elizabeth Jack is a former Olympic diver, representing Australia at Montreal in 1976.
