= Maxie Michael =

German diver

Personal information
- Nationality: German
- Born: 23 June 1951 (age 73); Balingen, West Germany

Sport
- Sport: Diving

Maxie Michael (born 23 June 1951) is a German diver. She competed in the women's 10 metre platform event at the 1972 Summer Olympics.
