= Olga Dmitriyeva =

Russian diver (born 1960)

Personal information
- Full name: Olga Viktorovna Dmitriyeva
- Born: 10 January 1960 (age 66) Moscow, Russia
- Height: 164 cm (5 ft 5 in)
- Weight: 53 kg (117 lb)

Sport
- Sport: Diving
Medal record
Women's diving
Representing Soviet Union
Universiade
Silver medal – second place	1973 Moscow	Platform

Olga Viktorovna Dmitriyeva (Russian: Ольга Викторовна Дмитриева, born 10 January 1960) is a Russian diver. She competed in the women's 3 metre springboard event at the 1976 Summer Olympics.
