= Aleksandr Gendrikson =

Soviet diver (born 1954)

Personal information
- Born: 30 August 1954 (age 71) Vladivostok, Russian SFSR, Soviet Union

Sport
- Sport: Diving
Medal record
Representing the Soviet Union
European Championships
Bronze medal – third place	1974 Vienna	Platform
Summer Universiade
Silver medal – second place	1973 Moscow	Platform

Aleksandr Gendrikson (Russian: Александр Гендриксон, born 30 August 1954) is a Soviet diver. He competed in the men's 10 metre platform event at the 1972 Summer Olympics.
