= Peri Suzan Özkum =

Turkish diver

Personal information
- Nationality: American/Turkish
- Born: Peri Suzan Özkum; 29 March 1959 (age 67)

Sport
- Sport: Diving

Peri Suzan Özkum Günay (born 29 March 1959) is a Turkish and American paediatrician and former diver. She competed in the women's 3 metre springboard event at the 1976 Summer Olympics.

== Education ==
Günay completed her BA in Psychology and Social Relations at Radcliffe College (1977-81) followed by her M.D. in Medicine at Dartmouth College (1982-86). She then completed an internship and residency in General Pediatrics at Northwestern University (1986-89).

== Awards ==
- Greater Newport Physicians, Primary Care Provider of the Year (2000; 2017; and 2019)
- Top Doctors of Orange County, Orange Coast Magazine (2004-2007)

== Personal life ==
Günay is the daughter of a Turkish father and an American mother. She is married to Mustafa Günay and has been residing in California in the United States.
