= Annita Smith =

Dutch diver

Personal information
- Nationality: Dutch
- Born: 25 May 1944 (age 81) Groningen, Netherlands

Sport
- Sport: Diving

Annita Smith (born 25 May 1944) is a Dutch diver. She competed in the women's 10 metre platform event at the 1972 Summer Olympics.
