= Sabina Sciubba =

Sabina
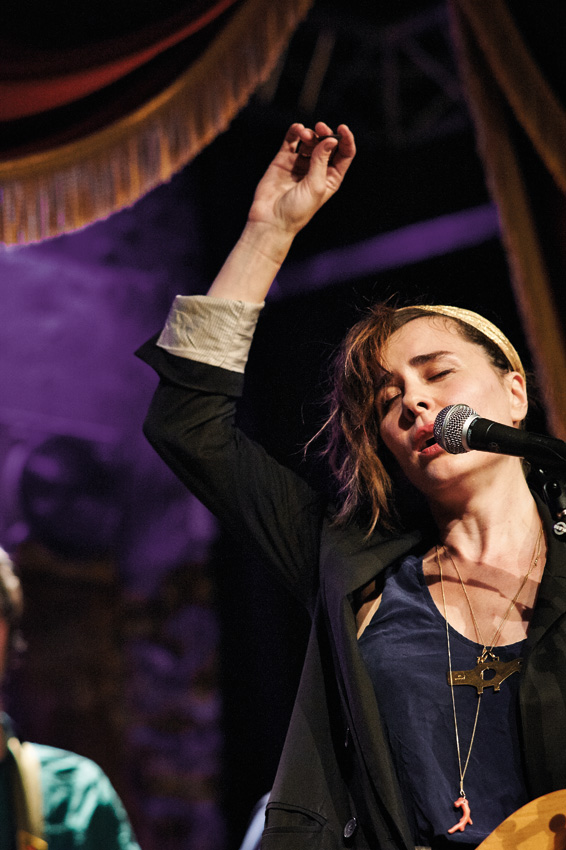

Background information
- Born: Sabina Margrit Sciubba; Rome, Italy
- Genres: Electronic; pop; alternative
- Occupations: Singer; actress; video artist
- Instruments: Vocals; guitar; piano
- Years active: 1996–present
- Labels: Verve; Six Degrees; Bar None; Naim
- Website: http://www.sabinasciubba.com

Sabina Sciubba, also known mononymously as Sabina, is a singer, songwriter, and actress. She became known as the founder and front woman of the electronic music group Brazilian Girls. She also has a solo career, and has also worked as an actress, appearing in a recurring role on the FX series Baskets, beginning in 2016. Sciubba has composed scores for feature films and commercials. She is also a visual artist.

== Early life ==
Sabina was born in Rome to a German mother and an Italian father. She lived there until age 5, then moved to Germany with her mother, painter Hannelore Jüterbock, and her brother, Christian, where she grew up in Berg, Upper Bavaria. After living in Italy, Germany and France, Sciubba later lived in New York from 1999 to 2009, before returning to France. She has commented on her childhood: "I grew up singing to trees, donkeys, sheep and horses, so I suppose there isn't an audience I'm not prepared for." Sciubba is fluent in six languages: German, Italian, French, English, Spanish and Portuguese. Her father, Enrico Sciubba is Professor for Thermodynamics at the university in Rome, San Pietro in Vincoli, La Sapienza.

== Brazilian Girls - The New York Years ==
Sabina moves to New York and soon meets the public eye as the frontwoman in her band Brazilian Girls. She stands out because of her unique contralto voice and her signature multilingual storytelling. She has also been called 'enigmatic' and is noted for her sense of fashion, wearing theatrical outfits often made by herself or by her fashion-designer friends threeasfour, Carolina K, and Gemma Kahng. In 2008 Sabina composed and sang the songs "Bring Back the Love" and "Os Novos Yorkinos" for Bebel Gilberto's album Momento. In 2009, Brazilian Girls were nominated for a Grammy Award in the Best Dance/Electronic Album category, but lost out to the band Daft Punk. In 2009 Sabina and Brazilian Girls member Didi Gutman wrote and produced singer Baaba Maal's album Television, released on Palm Pictures.

The band disbanded in 2019, just after the release of their fourth studio album "Let's make Love".

== Back to Europe - Toujours ==
Sciubba moves back to France in 2009. Her solo record, called Toujours, was released on February 18, 2014, on Bar None Records and Naim Edge, UK on March 23, 2014. Sabina's album was welcomed with overwhelmingly positive reviews. The Boston Globe reviewer Rebecca Ostriker calls Sabina "a goddess". Jon Pareles from The New York Times describes her as nonchalant, elusive, sophisticated and resolutely hedonistic. Allmusic says "Toujours is an album of true originality, executed with humor, warmth, and spark, and captivating from beginning to end." Q magazine calls it "A thoughtful solo debut", Uncut calls Sabina "A Dietrich pour nos jours". In 2009 Sciubba records the song 'Silence is golden' on Forro in the Dark's album 'Light a candle'. In 2011, Sciubba sings at the Lincoln Center, premiering 'Goldkind', a musical fairytale composed by Sciubba and Anthony Korf, accompanied by Riverside Symphony. She also composes and sings on Pretty Good Dance Moves's 2012 album Limo. On the collaboration project with Big Gigantic in 2012, she appears on the track "Love Letters".

== Force Majeure ==
On January 25, 2020, Sciubba premiered her visionary theatrical project "Force Majeure", a crossover between electronic and baroque music, performance, projection, stage art, in Teatro della compagnia in Florence, Italy, alongside 7 musicians, most notably her shadow (alias Daelen Cory) and a 20 piece children's choir. Her second solo record "Force Majeure", due for release on March 21, 2020, was pushed back because of the COVID-19 emergency, but Sciubba decided to self-release the record on her website, stating: "I named the project Force Majeure in 2018. The fact that the release date happened to be on the day of a major event of Force Majeure, made me feel like it was the perfect time to release it regardless, at least to my closest fans".

== Sleeping Dragon ==
On February 13, 2023, Sabina releases the first single "Adam" of her third solo work "Sleeping Dragon"

Then a second single "Paris Tropical" is released in May 2023.

The album Sleeping dragon was released in its entirety on June 23, 2023.

== Baskets ==
From 2016 until 2019, Sciubba played a recurring character, Penelope, alongside Zach Galifianakis in the television comedy series Baskets on FX.

In 2019, Sciubba released a single called "I Know you too well", featured in the TV series Baskets with Zach Galifianakis, in which she acted in three seasons. It was her first solo work after five years.

== Planet Funk ==
Sabina collaborates with the italian collective Planet Funk, writing and singing two songs, "Rolling Dice" and "Family Reunion" on their release "Blooom" in 2026.

== Stage persona ==
Since the beginnings with her band Brazilian Girls, Sciubba has experimented with theatricals and stage costumes expressing political comments and a dry sense of humour which established her as a "agente provocatrice" of the electronica scene.

One month after the premiere, COVID lockdowns stopped the world in its tracks.

== Film music ==
Sabina has composed musical scores for a number of films and television, including The Party's Over (with Philip Seymour Hoffman), Forty Shades of Blue, and Jimmy in Saigon, among others.

== Acting ==
Sciubba acted in the german TV series "[Marienhof] in three seasons in her youth. She thereafter did Cameos in several productions, including Louis Garrel's "Petit Tailleur" amongst others. From 2016 until 2019, Sciubba played a recurring character, Penelope, alongside Zach Galifianakis in the television comedy series Baskets on FX.

== Video work ==
Sabina released a self-produced video for her single 'Toujours' in 2013. She also made a series of short animated films, which she named Minifilms, which are political comments on human behaviour.

In early April 2014, renowned British artist Oliver Clegg created a video for and with Sabina for the single 'Viva l'amour'. The video consists of thousands of hand-drawn images of Sabina.

== Discography ==
- with Antonio Forcione, Meet Me in London, (Naim, 1997)
- with Chris Anderson, You Don't Know What Love Is, (Naim, 1998)
- Brazilian Girls, Brazilian Girls, (Verve, 2005)
- Brazilian Girls, Talk to La Bomb, (Verve, 2006)
- Brazilian Girls, New York City, (Verve, 2008)
- Toujours, (Bar None, Naim, 2014)
- Brazilian Girls, Let's Make Love, (Six Degrees Records, 2018)
- Force Majeure, (Goldkind records, 2020)
- Sleeping Dragon, (Goldkind Records, 2023)
- Bloom, Planet Funk, (The Orchard, 2026)

== Filmography ==
Year	Title	Role	Notes
1996	Marienhof	Sabina	15 episodes
2005	The Dig		Short film
2010	Little Tailor	La musicienne	Short film
2015	Stop Me Here	Chanteuse promenade	
2016–19	Baskets	Penelope	18 episodes
