= Ann Jones (diver) =

Australian diver

Personal information
- Full name: Glenise-Ann Jones
- Born: 25 October 1949 (age 76)
- Height: 155 cm (5 ft 1 in)
- Weight: 49 kg (108 lb)

Sport
- Country: Australia
- Sport: Diving

Glenise-Ann Jones, known as Ann Jones (born 25 October 1949) is a former Australian diver. She competed at the 1972 Munich Olympics in the 3 metre springboard event where she finished 26th of 30 and in the 10 metre platform event where she finished 26th.
