= Alla Selina =

Soviet diver

Personal information
- Nationality: Soviet
- Born: 5 January 1954 (age 72)

Sport
- Sport: Diving
Medal record
Women's diving
Representing Soviet Union
Universiade
Bronze medal – third place	1973 Moscow	Platform

Alla Selina (born 5 January 1954) is a Soviet diver. She competed in the women's 10 metre platform event at the 1972 Summer Olympics.
