= Déborah Weil =

Mexican diver

Personal information
- Born: 29 September 1957; Mexico City, Mexico
- Died: 6 November 2004 (aged 47); Kentish Town, England

Sport
- Sport: Diving

Déborah Weil (29 September 1957 – 6 November 2004) was a Mexican diver. She competed in the women's 10 metre platform event at the 1976 Summer Olympics.
