= Diving at the 1973 Summer Universiade =

The Diving competition in the 1973 Summer Universiade in Moscow, Soviet Union.

== Medal overview ==
Event	Gold	Silver	Bronze
Men's 3-Meter Springboard	Vyacheslav Strakhov (URS)	Vladimir Vasin (URS)	Steve McFarland (USA)
Men's Platform	Nikolay Mikhaylin (URS)	Aleksandr Gendrikson (URS)	Steve McFarland (USA)
Women's 3-Meter Springboard	Tamara Safonova (URS)	Milena Duchková (TCH)	Christine Loock (USA)
Women's Platform	Milena Duchková (TCH)	Olga Dmitriyeva (URS)	Alla Selina (URS)

== Medal table ==
* Host nation (Soviet Union)

Rank	Nation	Gold	Silver	Bronze	Total
1	Soviet Union (URS)	3	3	1	7
2	Czechoslovakia (TCH)	1	1	0	2
3	United States (USA)	0	0	3	3
Totals (3 entries)		4	4	4	12
