= Brigitte Duda =

Austrian diver

Personal information
- Nationality: Austrian
- Born: 2 March 1961 (age 64) Vienna, Austria

Sport
- Sport: Diving

Brigitte Duda (born 2 March 1961) is an Austrian diver. She competed in the women's 10 metre platform event at the 1976 Summer Olympics.
