= Micki King =

American diver (born 1944)

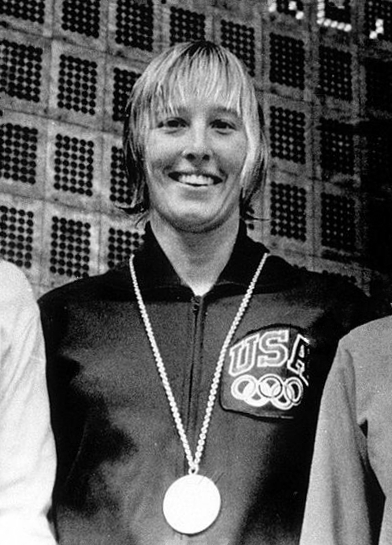
- King at the 1972 Olympics

Personal information
- Born: Maxine Joyce King; July 26, 1944 (age 81) Pontiac, Michigan, U.S.
- Height: 5 ft 7 in (170 cm)
- Weight: 130 lb (59 kg)

Sport
- Sport: Diving
- Club: Phillips 66 Swim Club
Medal record
Representing United States
Olympic Games
Gold medal – first place	1972 Munich	Springboard
Pan American Games
Silver medal – second place	1967 Winnipeg	Springboard
Silver medal – second place	1971 Cali	Springboard
Summer Universiade
Gold medal – first place	1967 Tokyo	Springboard
Bronze medal – third place	1967 Tokyo	Platform

Maxine Joyce "Micki" King (born July 26, 1944) is an American former competitive diver and diving coach. She was a gold medal winner at the 1972 Summer Olympics in the three meter springboard event.

She was the dominant figure in women's diving in the United States from 1965 to 1972, winning 10 national championships, including both springboard and platform events. At the 1968 Summer Olympics, she was in first place in the three meter springboard event when she broke her left arm on the ninth dive; she completed the tenth dive, but finished in fourth place. In 1972, she made a comeback at the Munich Olympics, winning the gold medal in the three meter springboard event.

King was a career officer in the United States Air Force from 1966 to 1992, retiring with the rank of colonel. She taught physical education and coached diving at the United States Air Force Academy, becoming the first woman to serve on the faculty of a U.S. military academy and the first woman to coach a male athlete to an NCAA championship. She was named NCAA Division II Coach of the Year three times. From 1992 to 2006, King was assistant athletic director at the University of Kentucky. She was also the president of US Diving from 1990 to 1994. She has been inducted into the United States Olympic Hall of Fame, the International Women's Sports Hall of Fame, the International Swimming Hall of Fame, and the University of Michigan Athletic Hall of Honor.

== Early years ==
King was born in Pontiac, Michigan, the daughter of a General Motors tool engineer in Pontiac. She developed a love of water sports at her family's cottage in Waterford, Michigan. She began diving at age ten through lessons at the YMCA in downtown Pontiac. She attended Pontiac Central High School. Throughout high school she entered and won AAU meets regularly.

== University of Michigan and Ann Arbor Swim Club ==
King attended the University of Michigan from 1961 to 1965. When King arrived at Michigan in 1961, it did not have a women's diving program. When men's diving coach Dick Kimball saw King, he saw a potential diving star; he saw strength, desire, a natural spring and great athleticism. Kimball decided to train King with the men's team. Working with Kimball, King became the first woman to master a number of dives, including a 1-1/2 somersault dive with a 2-1/2 twist on a ten-meter tower.

In the years before Title IX, women were not permitted to compete in Michigan athletics, but Kimball and King circumvented the system. King recalled, "One of Coach Kimball's greatest lines was that he didn't coach men or women he coached people. He taught me dives that no woman had ever done before. I pioneered those dives. Coach Kimball knew that we were a team of people." She noted: "We used the women's pool at the CCRB. What was ironic was that the men were allowed to come into and use the women's pool but the women couldn't even come into the men's. What Kimball would do was sneak us through the back doors because the front door was right in front of the administrators. We used the spectator bathroom and used washcloths and the public sink as a shower. We thought we were lucky."

She was the dominant figure in women's diving in the United States from 1965 to 1972. In 1965, competing for the Ann Arbor Swim Club (since Michigan did not have a team), King was the US national indoor platform champion, the national outdoor three-meter champion and was named Diver of the Year. After graduating from Michigan, King joined the US Air Force in 1966 and was assigned to the Air Force ROTC program in Ann Arbor, Michigan, where she continued to train with Dick Kimball. In all, King won ten US national diving championships in the outdoor three-meter springboard (1965, 1967, 1969, 1970), one meter (1967), platform (1969), and indoor three-meter springboard (1965, 1971).

King also excelled in water polo. She led the Ann Arbor Swim Club to two AAU national championships (1961–1963) and was twice named an All-American goalie.

== 1968 and 1972 Olympic Games ==
Going into the 1968 Summer Olympics, King was the favorite in the three-meter competition. She was popular with American diving fans not only for her diving ability but also for her personality and good looks. A 1967 Associated Press article described her as "shapely" and "a vivacious, blue-eyed blond, who does justice to a bathing suit". She is remembered for her courageous performance in the 1968 Summer Olympics in which she was in first place when she broke her left forearm on her ninth dive. She later recalled: "I was leading with only three dives to go, but on my second-to-last dive, I hit the board with my arm. The irony was that I could have done my cleanup dive with a broken leg, but I didn't know I had to do it with a broken arm. I didn't think it was going to hurt, and when it did, it shook me up." The pain caused King to lose form on her last dive, and she slipped from first to fourth.

She made an Olympic comeback and won the gold medal in the 1972 Summer Olympics in the three-meter springboard event. King noted that, while she was caught up in the pageantry and adventure of the Olympics in 1968, she was 28 years old at the Munich games; she viewed it as her "last hurrah," and "it was all business." Going into the final round in Munich, King was in third place. She won the gold on her final dive, the same half-somersault with a one-and-a-half twist that cost her gold in Mexico City. When Palestinian gunmen took Israeli athletes hostage, King and her coaches used zoom lenses to observe the gunmen on a balcony outside an apartment of Israeli athletes. "The Olympics are such a wonderful tradition for sport, but it has never been the same since 1972, given the tragedy there," King said. "The beauty of sportsmanship is spoiled by the need for security."

== US Air Force ==
King also had a 26-year career in the US Air Force from 1966 to 1992. While preparing for the 1972 Olympics, King trained at the United States Air Force Academy in Colorado. In 1973, she was assigned to instruct physical education and coach diving at the Air Force Academy, becoming the first woman to hold a faculty position at a US military academy, and the only female coach in any sport to coach a male athlete to an NCAA championship. She coached Air Force divers to 11 All-America honors and four national titles, and was twice named NCAA Division II Coach of the Year. In 1992, King retired from the Air Force as a full colonel.

In 1976, King married Air Force pilot, Jim Hogue, and she changed her name during the marriage to Micki King Hogue. In 1982, King had a daughter, Michelle Hogue. In 1984, she had a son, Kevin Hogue.

While serving in the Air Force, King was a member of the committee that led the way for women to be admitted to the US military academies. King's daughter, Michelle Hogue, graduated from the Air Force Academy in 2004. At the time, King noted, "Never once in the two years of committee work did I ever dream that my own daughter would be a beneficiary." On her graduation, King's daughter presented King with a class ring from the academy. King noted, "She said if anybody should have a class ring, I should."

== Television ==
In addition to being a color commentator with Bill Flemming for ABC's television coverage at the 1976 Summer Olympics, King was also a competitor in the 1970s television series, Superstars and Battle of the Sexes. She appeared on The Tonight Show Starring Johnny Carson on October 25, 1972. Appeared on the television show "To Tell the Truth", 1973–74 season five.

== University of Kentucky ==
In 1992, King became an assistant athletic director and senior women's administrator at the University of Kentucky where she remained for 14 years. She was also the first woman to command Kentucky's ROTC detachment. King was relieved of her duties as part of a major shake-up in the Kentucky athletics department in May 2006.

== Continued involvement in Olympic diving ==
She has remained active in Olympic diving over the years. King was a color commentator on ABC television's coverage of the 1976 Summer Olympics. She had been scheduled to do the color commentary at the 1980 Moscow games that were boycotted by the United States. At the 1988 Summer Olympics in Seoul, South Korea, King was the team leader for the US diving team. From 1990 to 1994, King was the president of US Diving, the governing body for US divers, and attended the 1992 Summer Olympics in that capacity. At the 1996 Summer Olympics in Atlanta, King was again the Olympic team leader for US divers; she sequestered the team for intensive training at the University of Kentucky facilities before the games. At the time, she noted, "We'll train in Lexington because it's in the same time zone, it has great facilities and I wanted another week at home." In 2001, she was part of an independent review commission that concluded that US Track & Field did not intentionally cover up positive drug tests but did not follow procedures in reporting violators. In April 2005, King was elected to serve a four-year term as vice president of the US Olympians Association.

== Women's Sports Foundation ==
In 1974, King was one of the founders of the Women's Sports Foundation along with Billie Jean King, Donna de Varona, and Wyomia Tyus. She was a member of the Foundation's Board of Trustees from 1988 to 1990 and has served on its Board of Stewards since 1990. Long a proponent of funding for women's sports, King noted in 1999, "The test of Title IX is to go into high schools and ask the girls about the history of their teams. When today's 17-year-old assumes there has always been a volleyball team at their school, then it has become accepted as part of their culture."

== Awards and honors ==
She has received numerous awards and honors, including:

- In 1978, she was inducted into the International Swimming Hall of Fame.
- She was inducted into the International Women's Sports Hall of Fame in 1983. She was the first diver inducted, and only 20 athletes were inducted before King.
- In 1986, King was inducted into the University of Michigan Athletic Hall of Honor. She was the first woman inducted.
- In 1988, King received the Glenn McCormick Annual Award presented by US Diving for outstanding contributions to the sport of diving.
- In 1992, she was inducted into the United States Olympic Hall of Fame.
- In 1993, she was inducted into the Michigan Sports Hall of Fame.
- In 1994, the University of Michigan "M" Club awarded King an Honorary "M". When King attended Michigan, women's diving was not a varsity sport, and she therefore did not receive a varsity letter during her years as a student.
- In 2001, King received the Phil Boggs Award for individual excellence in diving and for giving back to the sport.

== See also ==
- Diving at the 1968 Summer Olympics - Women's 3 metre springboard
- Diving at the 1972 Summer Olympics - Women's 3 metre springboard
- Diving at the 1972 Summer Olympics - Women's 10 metre platform
- World Fit
