= Taeko Kubo =

Japanese diver

Personal information
- Nationality: Japanese
- Born: 10 February 1949 (age 76)

Sport
- Sport: Diving

Taeko Kubo (久保たえ子, Kubo Taeko, born 10 February 1949) is a Japanese diver. She competed in the women's 3 metre springboard event at the 1972 Summer Olympics.
