= Elena Vaytsekhovskaya =

Soviet diver

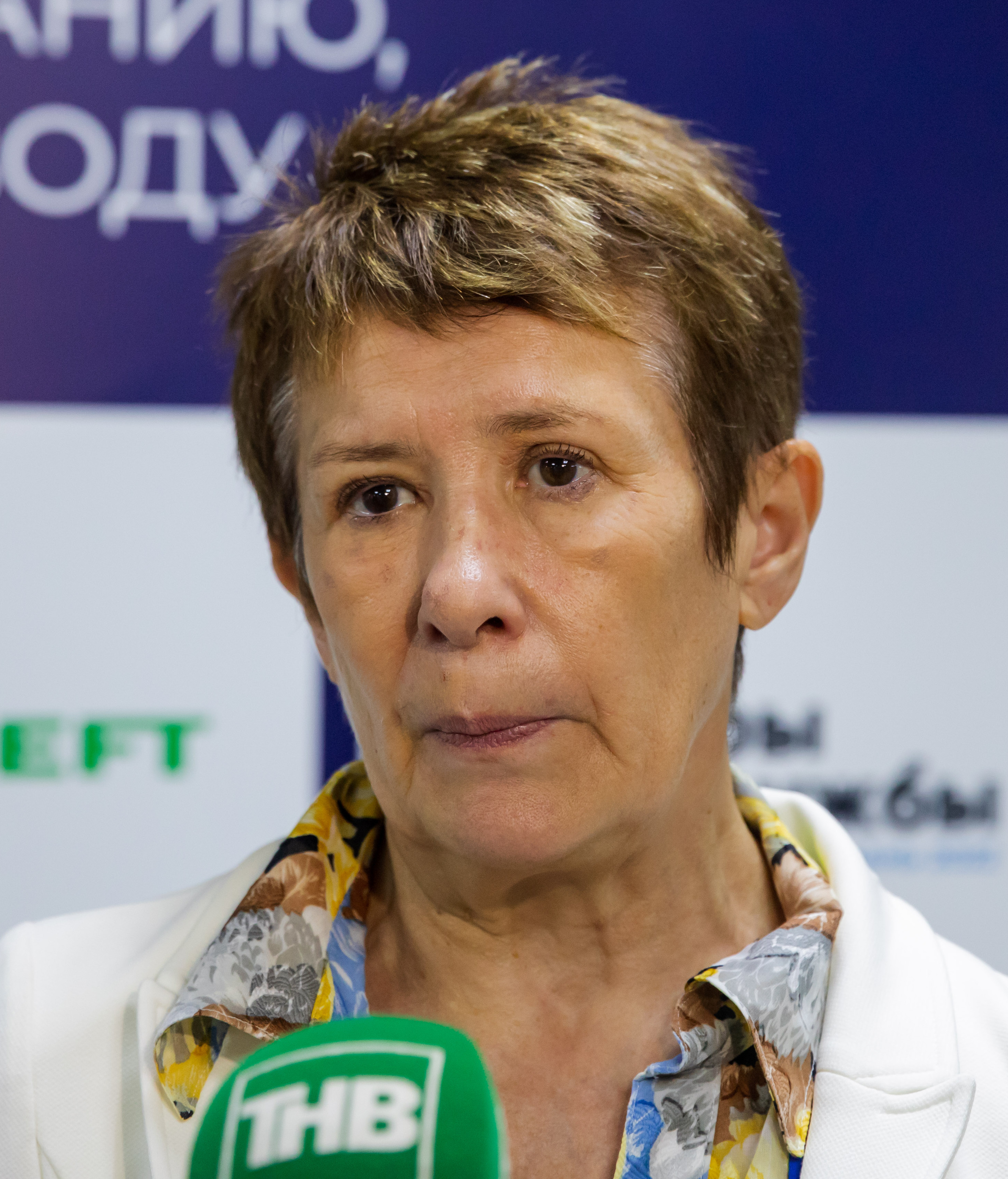
- Vaytsekhovskaya in 2022

Personal information
- Born: March 1, 1958 (age 68)

Sport
- Sport: Diving
Medal record
Representing the Soviet Union
Olympic Games
Gold medal – first place	1976 Montreal	10 m platform
European Championships
Silver medal – second place	1977 Jönköping	10 m platform
Bronze medal – third place	1974 Vienna	10 m platform
Universiade
Silver medal – second place	1977 Sofia	Platform

Elena Sergeyevna Vaytsekhovskaya (Russian: Елена Сергеевна Вайцеховская; born 1 March 1958) is a former Russian diver.

== Career ==
She competed at the 1976 Olympic Games in Montreal, where she won the gold medal in the 10 m platform. She won silver and bronze medals in the 10m diving at the European Championships in 1974 and 1977.

Since 1991, she has worked as a sports journalist for Sport Express, and is considered one of the best sports journalists in Russia.

== See also ==
- List of members of the International Swimming Hall of Fame
