= Ben Allison =

Ben Allison may refer to:

- Ben Allison (musician) (born 1966), American jazz musician
- Ben Allison (cricketer) (born 1999), English cricketer
