= Deborah Wilson =

American diver (born 1955)

Personal information
- Nickname: Debbie
- Born: Deborah Keplar; November 5, 1955 (age 70) Columbus, Ohio
- Height: 165 cm (5 ft 5 in)
- Weight: 115 lb (52 kg)
Medal record
Women's diving
Representing the United States
Olympic Games
Bronze medal – third place	1976 Montreal	10 m platform

Deborah Wilson (née Keplar born 5 November 1955) is an American diver. Wilson originally competed in springboard diving before moving on to platform diving. As a platform diver, she was first at the 1973 Amateur Athletic Union national diving championships. She participated in the 1973 World Aquatics Championships and 1975 World Aquatics Championships but did not medal in either championship. In international competitions, Wilson won a bronze medal in the women's 10 metre platform event at the 1976 Summer Olympics.

== Early life and education ==
Wilson was born on 5 November 1955 in Columbus, Ohio. When she was twelve, Wilson was both a swimmer and diver before she decided to focus on diving. For her post-secondary education, Wilson went to Ohio State.

== Career ==
Wilson's first major competition was at the Amateur Athletic Union Outdoor Diving Championships in July 1972. At the championships, she finished in tenth place in the women's 3m springboard event. A few months later, she was eleventh at the 1972 United States Olympic Trials in 3m springboard. Wilson moved to platform diving in June 1973 when coach Ron O'Brien recommended the sport to her. Her first win in platform was at the women's 10 metre platform event during the 1973 Amateur Athletic Union national diving championships. At a following AAU indoor diving championship, Wilson placed in third during the 1975 competition.

In world competitions, Wilson was seventh at the 1973 World Aquatics Championships. At the following championships, Wilson did not qualify for the finals at the 1975 World Aquatics Championships. In 1976, Wilson considered retiring from swimming but was convinced by her husband to keep competing. Later that year, Wilson won the bronze medal at the 1976 Summer Olympics in 10m platform.

== Personal life ==
Wilson is married with two children.
