= Jennifer Chandler =

American diver

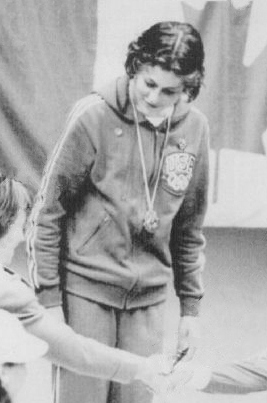
- Chandler in 1976

Personal information
- Full name: Jennifer Kay Bellamy Chandler
- Born: June 30, 1959 (age 67) Langdale, Alabama, U.S.
- Height: 5 ft 6 in (1.68 m)
- Weight: 115 lb (52 kg)

Sport
- Sport: Diving
- Club: Ron O'Brien Diving School, Columbus
- Coached by: Ron O'Brien
Medal record
Representing the United States
Olympic Games
Gold medal – first place	1976 Montréal	3 m springboard
World Championships
Bronze medal – third place	1978 West Berlin	3 m springboard
Pan American Games
Gold medal – first place	1975 Mexico City	3 m springboard

Jennifer Kay Bellamy Chandler (born June 13, 1959) is a retired American diver who attended the University of Arizona, and won a gold medal in diving in the 1976 Montreal Olympics.

Chandler was born on June 30, 1959 in Langdale, Alabama, and started diving when she was nine. She went to the junior Olympics at the age of 12, and in 1975 won the AAU national indoor 1-meter springboard event. In 1976 she captured the national indoor 3-meter springboard championship.

== Diving highlights ==
She won a gold medal in the women's 3-metre springboard event at the 1976 Summer Olympics in Montreal.

In international competition, she won a gold at the 1975 Pan American Games and a bronze medal at the 1978 World Aquatics Championships. She was a seven-time national diving champion.

Chandler retired from diving when she was 21 due to back injuries.

=== Education ===
She earned a BFA in drawing and painting from The University of Arizona. She was married to John W. Stevenson, the publisher and editor of The Randolph Leader in Roanoke, Alabama, until his death in 2019. Chandler is also a painter with work on display through the Art of the Olympians organization.

=== Post-diving careers ===
Chandler has done work as an expert commentator for several national television networks. For 10 years, she worked for the Lakeshore Foundation, a world-class rehabilitation and athletic training facility located in Birmingham, Alabama, as their development and special events coordinator. In 2021, Chandler became the director of development for the Vulcan Park and Museum in Birmingham. Three years later, she became director of community outreach for the museum.

=== Honors ===
She was inducted into the Alabama Sports Hall of Fame (ASHOF) in 1985, and was elected to the International Swimming Hall of Fame in 1987. She became the educational outreach director for the American Swimming Hall of Fame (ASHOF) in 2003.

== See also ==
- List of members of the International Swimming Hall of Fame
