= New York City (Brazilian Girls album) =

Studio album by Brazilian Girls
- Released: July 29, 2008
- Genre: Alternative dance; downtempo; electronic
- Label: Verve
- Producer: Hector Castillo, Brazilian Girls

Brazilian Girls chronology
Talk to La Bomb (2006)	New York City (2008)	Let's Make Love (2018)

Professional ratings
Review scores
Source	Rating
AllMusic	3.5/5 stars
Pitchfork	7.2/10
Slant Magazine	3/5 stars
PopMatters	5/10 stars
Consequence	B

New York City is the third album by electronica group Brazilian Girls, released in 2008.

Brazilian Girls received a Grammy nomination for Best Dance Recording in 2009. Daft Punk ended up winning the Grammy for the live album Alive 2007.

== Track listing ==
1. "St. Petersburg"
2. "Losing Myself"
3. "Berlin"
4. "Strangeboy"
5. "Good Time"
6. "Nouveau Americain"
7. "L'Interprete"
8. "Internacional" (Barry Reynolds, Baaba Maal)
9. "Ricardo"
10. "I Want Out"
11. "Mano de Dios"
