= Talk to La Bomb =

Studio album by Brazilian Girls
- Released: September 12, 2006
- Genre: Alternative dance; downtempo; electronic; pop
- Length: 52:53
- Label: Verve Forecast
- Producer: Brazilian Girls; Mark Plati; ("Last Call" by Ric Ocasek)

Brazilian Girls chronology
Brazilian Girls (2005)	Talk to La Bomb (2006)	New York City (2008)

Professional ratings
Review scores
Source	Rating
AllMusic	3/5 stars
Robert Christgau	B
Pitchfork	(7.8/10)

Talk to La Bomb is the second album by the electronic music group Brazilian Girls. It was released on September 12, 2006, by Verve Forecast. The album continued with their "genre-bending" style, drawing from diverse genres such as electro ("Jique") and tango ("Rules of the Game").

== Track listing ==
All songs written by Brazilian Girls.

1. "Jique"
2. "All About Us"
3. "Last Call"
4. "Never Met a German"
5. "Sweatshop"
6. "Le Territoire"
7. "Rules of the Game"
8. "Talk to the Bomb"
9. "Nicotine"
10. "Tourist Trap"
11. "Sexy Asshole"
12. "Problem"
