= Riverside Symphony =

American professional orchestra

- Orchestra
- Founded: 1981
- Location: New York City, US
- Concert hall: Alice Tully Hall, Lincoln Center
- Principal conductor: George Rothman
- Website: riversidesymphony.org

Riverside Symphony is a New York-based professional orchestra founded in 1981 by conductor George Rothman and composer Anthony Korf. The orchestra performs an annual three-concert series at Alice Tully Hall, Lincoln Center and is recognized for programs which emphasize lesser known repertoire. The orchestra provides an ongoing forum for emerging soloists of exceptional promise and has showcased numerous instrumental and vocal talents over its history.

== History ==
Directors George Rothman and Anthony Korf met as students at the Manhattan School of Music during the mid 1970s and formed Riverside Symphony after a 1980 concert at Riverside Church. Numbering some 40 musicians in its core roster, the orchestra draws upon New York City's freelance community for its talent, at times expanding in size to meet the demands of larger works. Since the Symphony's inception, directors George Rothman and Anthony Korf have served as Conductor and Composer-in-Residence respectively.

The orchestra's concerts regularly feature guest soloists from around the world. These have included early career appearances by Carter Brey, Frederic Chiu, Jeremy Denk, Tim Fain, Marc-André Hamelin, Christopher O'Riley, and Shai Wosner. The Symphony has also collaborated with guest narrators Cynthia Nixon, Sam Waterston, and Irene Worth.

Riverside Symphony's curatorial focus has been mainly directed to overlooked corners of the repertory, with a special emphasis on contemporary music. The orchestra has championed such American composers as Andrew Imbrie, Stephen Hartke, George Tsontakis, Mario Davidovsky, and Ricardo Zohn-Muldoon, and European composers Marius Constant, Henri Dutilleux, Guus Janssen, and Robert Suter, among others.

Furthermore, Riverside Symphony's International Composer Reading Program has sought to expand the field of opportunity for living composers worldwide. While several of the readings have been devoted solely to American works chosen from an open competition process, several installations of this project have also focused on works by composers from a designated country, such as France, Norway, or Switzerland.

== Recordings ==
Riverside Symphony appears on seven recordings, one of which was Grammy Award Nominee in 2000. All seven recordings consist of 20th- and 21st-century music, namely works by Mario Davidovsky, Stephen Hartke, Andrew Imbrie, Anthony Korf, Poul Ruders, and Maurice Wright.

Year	Album Details	Works
2014	Marius Constant: Released: 2014; Label: Riverside Symphony Records; Includes a 'Behind the Scenes' video on the CD	Compositions by Marius Constant: Turner (1961); Brevissima (1992); 103 Regards dans l'eau (1981); Olivier Charlier, violin
2009	Anthony Korf: Presences from Aforetime: Released: 2009; Label: Bridge Records; Featured in Fanfare Magazine's 2009 "Want List" of Top Recordings	Compositions by Anthony Korf: Presences from Aforetime (1999); Six Miniatures for Flute with Piano (1997); Tara Helen O’Connor, flute; Christopher Oldfather, piano; Three Movements for Clarinet Solo (1992); Alan R. Kay, clarinet; Symphony No. 3 (2007)
2002	Mario Davidovsky: Three Cycles on Biblical Texts: Released: 2002; Label: Bridge Records	Compositions by Mario Davidovsky: Shulamit's Dream (1993), for soprano and orchestra; Susan Narucki, soprano; Scenes from Shir ha-Shirim (1975), for soprano, two tenors, bass soli and chamber ensemble; Biblical Songs (1990), for soprano, flute, clarinet, violin, cello, and piano
1999	Andrew Imbrie: Requiem; Piano Concerto No. 3: Released: 1999; Label: Bridge Records; 2000 Grammy Nominee; Fanfare Magazine's "Critic's Choice, Best of Year"	Compositions by Andrew Imbrie: Requiem (1984); Piano Concerto No. 3 (1991)
1998	Stephen Hartke: Concerto for Violin & Orchestra, “Auld Swaara”; Symphony No. 2: Released: 1998; Label: New World Records	Compositions by Stephen Hartke: Concerto for Violin and Orchestra, “Auld Swaara” (1992); Michelle Makarski, violin; Symphony No. 2 (1990)
1995	Poul Ruders: The Christmas Gospel: Released: 1995; Label: Bridge Records	Compositions by Poul Ruders: Violin Concerto No. 1 (1981); Etude & Ricercare (1994), for guitar; The Bells (1993), for soprano and ensemble; The Christmas Gospel (1994)
1990	Davidovsky/Korf/Wright: Orchestral Works: Released: 1990; Label: New World Records	Anthony Korf: Symphony No. 2, “Blue Note” (1987); Mario Davidovsky: Divertimento (1984), for cello and orchestra; Maurice Wright: Night Scenes (1988)

== Educational programs ==
In 1999, Riverside Symphony launched the year-long classroom learning program Music Memory in New York City public schools, and has since grown from a handful of schools to serve thousands of school children annually in all five boroughs. Based on a curriculum from Mighty Music Memory, this nationally recognized program is "designed to promote the love and knowledge of classical music through an in-depth study of sixteen great composers, their lives and their music each year." The program concludes every year with the Music Memory Citywide Finals, held at NYU's Skirball Center for the Performing Arts, in which students "must identify the composition and composer of a piece of classical or jazz music they studied after listening to only a short melodic fragment." Music Memory has been endorsed by the New York City Department of Education's Director of Music Barbara Murray.

Riverside Symphony also coordinates music education programs for adults in conjunction with its concert season. The orchestra's Salon Series provides "behind-the-scenes concert previews" with commentary from Riverside Symphony's directors and musical excerpts from guest musicians and/or orchestra members. Hear Hear!, on the other hand, provides a pre-concert preview performance of the evening's featured contemporary work, borne out of the conviction that "nothing beats repeated listening" when it comes to understanding new music.
