= Marina Janicke =

East German diver

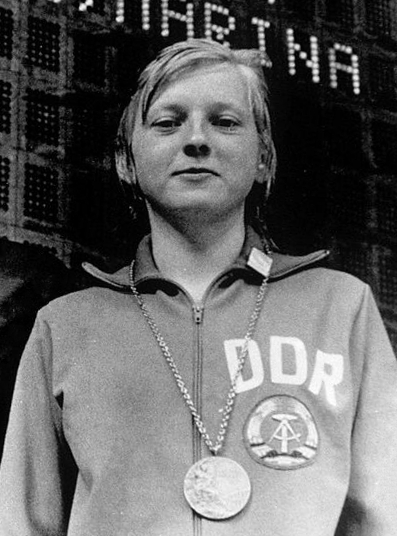
- Janicke at the 1972 Olympics

Personal information
- Born: 19 June 1954 (age 72) Berlin, Germany
- Height: 160 cm (5 ft 3 in)
- Weight: 51 kg (112 lb)

Sport
- Sport: Diving
- Club: Berliner TSC
Medal record
Representing East Germany
Olympic Games
Bronze medal – third place	1972 Munich	Springboard
Bronze medal – third place	1972 Munich	Platform
World Championships
Bronze medal – third place	1973 Belgrade	Springboard
European Championships
Silver medal – second place	1970 Barcelona	Springboard
Silver medal – second place	1970 Barcelona	Platform

Marina Janicke (later Höhne, born 19 June 1954) is a retired East German diver who won bronze medals in the 3 m springboard and 10 m platform at the 1972 Olympics. She won silver medals in these events at the 1970 European Championships, and a bronze in the springboard at the 1973 World Championships.
