= Melania Decuseară =

Romanian diver

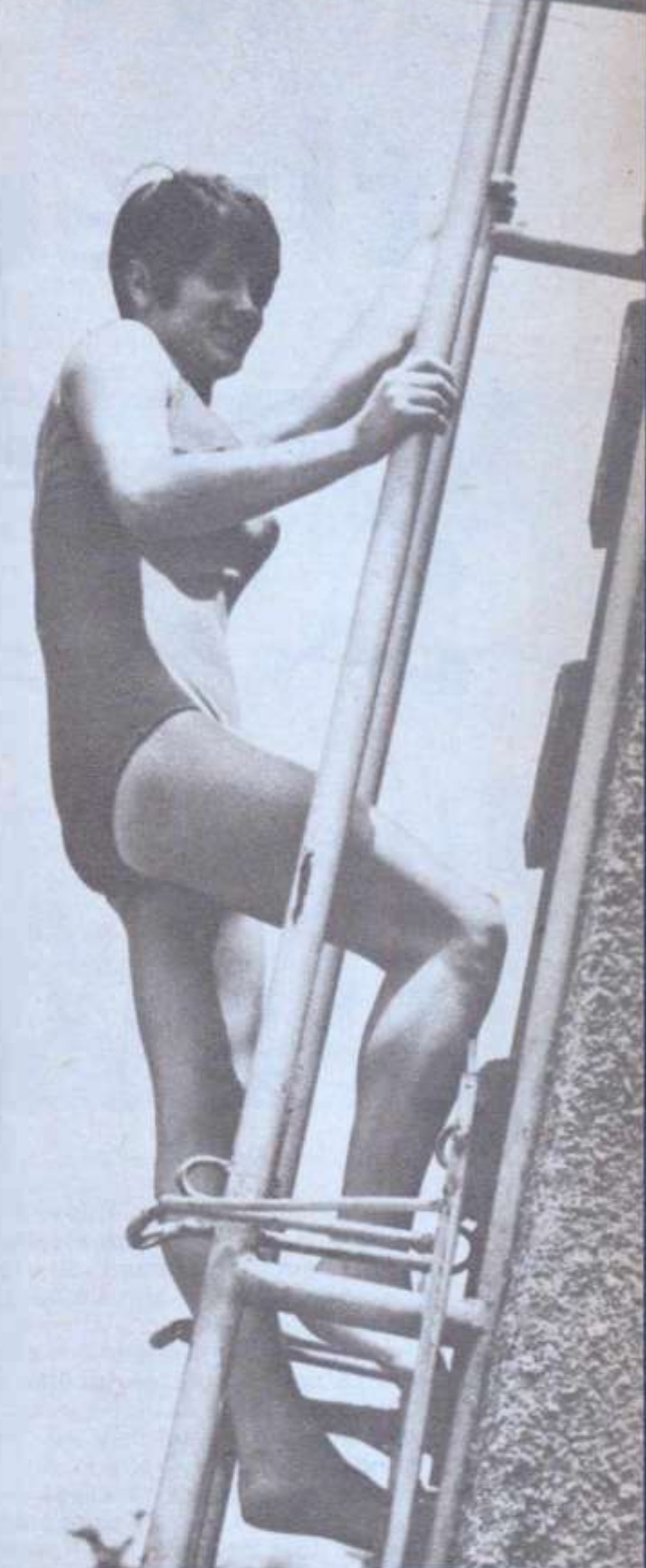
- Melania Decuseară in 1969

Personal information
- Nationality: Romanian
- Born: 22 November 1945 (age 80) Bucharest, Romania

Sport
- Sport: Diving

Melania Decuseară (born 22 November 1945) is a Romanian diver. She competed in two events at the 1972 Summer Olympics.
