= Kerstin Krause =

German diver

Personal information
- Nationality: German
- Born: 28 January 1959 (age 66); Perleberg, East Germany

Sport
- Sport: Diving

Kerstin Krause (born 28 January 1959) is a German diver. She competed at the 1976 Summer Olympics and the 1980 Summer Olympics.
