= Aura Di Nasio =

Venezuelan diver

Personal information
- Nationality: Venezuelan
- Born: 14 December 1959 (age 65)

Sport
- Sport: Diving

Aura Di Nasio (born 14 December 1959) is a Venezuelan diver. She competed in the women's 3 metre springboard event at the 1976 Summer Olympics.
