= Regina Krajnow =

Polish diver

Personal information
- Nationality: Polish
- Born: 9 June 1950 (age 74); Gryfice, Poland

Sport
- Sport: Diving

Regina Krajnow (born 9 June 1950) is a Polish diver. She competed in two events at the 1972 Summer Olympics.
