= Taeko Kunishima =

Japanese jazz pianist

- Birth name: Taeko Kunishima
- Born: September 2
- Genres: Jazz music
- Instrument: Piano
- Labels: 33Jazz

Taeko Kunishima (September 2) is a Japanese jazz pianist, who has released four albums on the UK label 33Jazz. Initially influenced by classical composers, she switched to jazz music after listening to Miles Davis. She incorporates traditional Japanese music into her repertoire, frequently composing for and collaborating with shakuhachi (Japanese flute) and shamisen (Japanese three-stringed lute) .

== Life ==
Taeko Kunishima's first contact with the piano was at the age of seven. Initially influenced by classical composers such as Beethoven and Mozart, she studied classical piano at university. However, after listening to jazz trumpeter Miles Davis her style changed significantly. She later moved to England and began to develop her personal style - in the words of AllAboutJazz, "her startling, angular contemporary jazz approach, echoing Thelonious Monk and influences of her native Japan." In the United Kingdom she worked with various musicians in assorted styles such as Latin pop and electronic music.

Kunishima recorded her debut album, Space to Be, in 2004, and her second, Red Dragonfly, in 2006, both issued by 33Jazz. Radio station Jazz FM played tracks from her debut album. Kunishima also performed live sessions on London art radio station Resonance FM . She performed in the Isle of Wight International Jazz Festival, London Jazz Festival, and the Vortex Jazz Club. Since 2006 she has collaborated with UK shakuhachi player Clive Bell. In January, June and July 2008 she played across Germany, backed by American drummer David Bowler from the Ahmad Jamal Trio .

Her third album, Late Autumn, was recorded in May 2011. The album featured and was produced by Clive Bell, inspired by the works of Japanese film maker Yasujirō Ozu. It "mixes her natural lyricism with Japanese surrealism and fast swing American jazz". "Taeko Kunishima's Late Autumn is the perfect storm of repertoire, arrangements and players, with something for everyone" (Lawrence Peryer).

The fourth album, Iridescent Clouds, was released on the 33Jazz label in September 2016. Musicians featured include Clive Bell (shakuhachi, khene mouth organ), Paul Moylan (bass), percussionist Camilo Tirado on tablas, cahon and gongs, and the Tsugaru shamisen of Hibiki Ichikawa. Jeremy Hawkins's field recordings add sounds of Japanese birdsong and seaside. BBC Radio 3's Late Junction played the track "Everything Is In The Air." James Nadal from All About Jazz chose Iridescent Clouds as one of his best albums of 2016. All About Jazz review: "Acknowledged for her trademark lyricism, pianist Taeko Kunishima reflects upon the wonders of nature on Iridescent Clouds, offering elegant improvised passages encased in a meditative concept." Ian Mann (The Jazz Mann): "This is carefully crafted, consistently beautiful music that has a way of getting under your skin and staying there, something that the intriguing and exotic instrumentation positively encourages."

In 2017 Taeko Kunishima's group performed as part of the London Jazz Festival.
