= Renate Piotraschke =

German diver

Personal information
- Nationality: German
- Born: 1 October 1959 (age 65); Würselen, Germany

Sport
- Sport: Diving

Renate Piotraschke (born 1 October 1959) is a German diver. She competed in two events – 3 m springboard and 10 m platform – at the 1976 Summer Olympics.
