= Juan-David Nasio =

French psychoanalyst (born 1942)

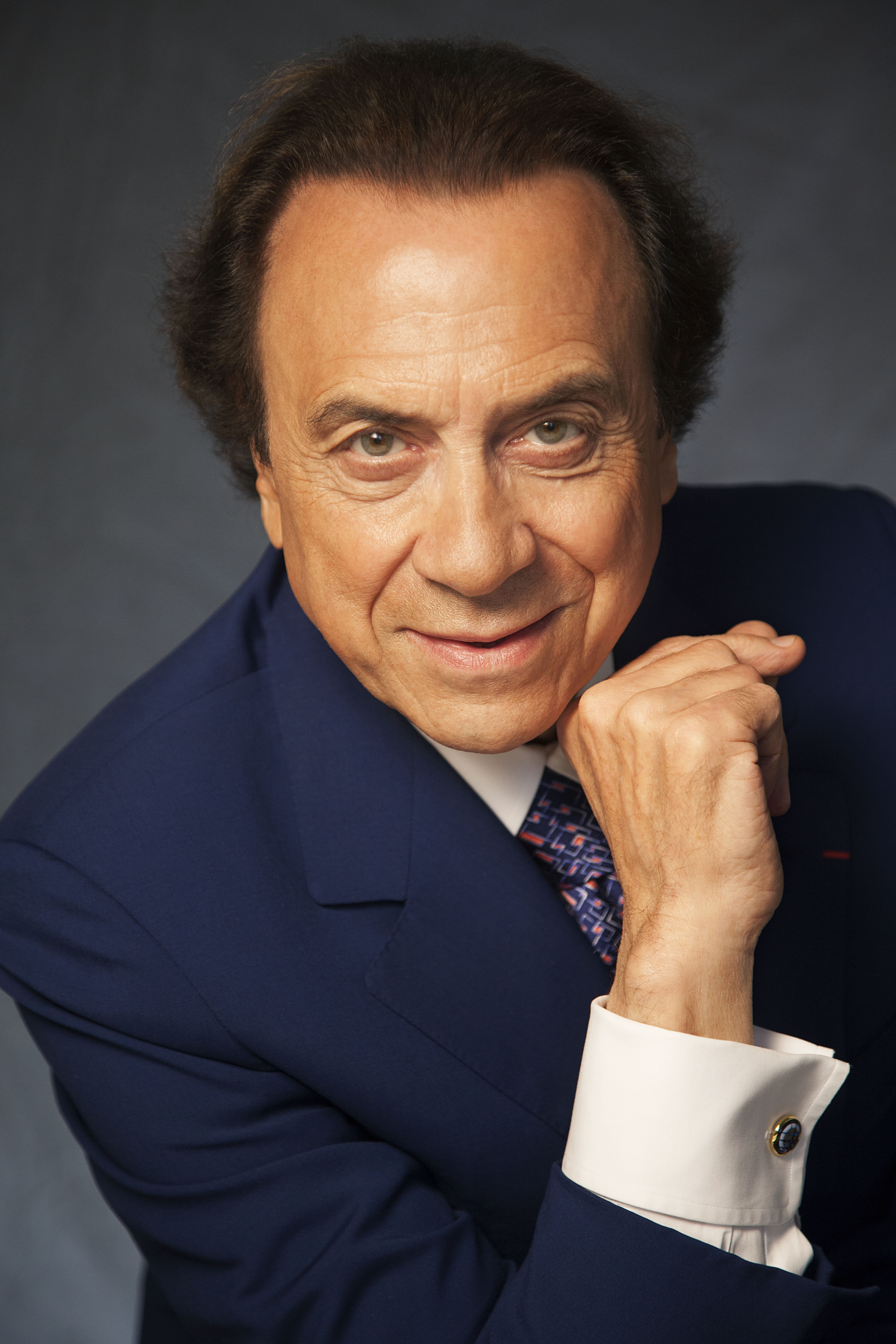
Psychiatrist, psychoanalyst and writer. Photo taken by Carole Bellaïche.

Juan-David Nasio (born 1942 in Rosario, Argentina) is an Argentinian psychiatrist, psychoanalyst and writer. He is one of the founders of Séminaires Psychanalytiques de Paris.

== Biography ==
After qualifying as a doctor from the University of Buenos Aires, Nasio completed his residency as a psychiatrist at the hospital in Lanús. In 1969, he emigrated to France where he attended the classes of Jacques Lacan.

He was a professor at the University of Paris VII Sorbonne for 30 years from 1971 and for three years had a seminar in the école Freudienne de Paris (1977-1980). After its dissolution in 1980, he founded the Séminaires Psychanalytiques de Paris (1986). He received the French Legion of Honour.

In addition to participating in Lacan's seminars and translating his Écrits into Spanish, he is the author of 27 books published in French, six of which have been translated into English. Including English, his books have been translated into 14 languages: German, Chinese, Korean, Danish, Spanish, Greek, Italian, Japanese, Persian, Portuguese, Romanian, Russian, and Turkish.

From 2022 to 2024, he told twenty-two patient stories in the radio program L’inconscient (France Inter), which aired weekly and reached a wide audience, according to France Inter.

== Distinctions ==
- 1999: Knight of Legion of Honor.
- 2001: Illustrious citizen of the city of Rosario.
- 2004: Officer of ordre national du Mérite.
- 2012: Doctor honoris causa of the University of Buenos Aires and of the University of Tucuman.
- 2015: Doctor honoris causa of the Autonomous University of Mexico State.
- 2016: Doctor honoris causa of the University of Rosario and of the University 21 Century of Córdoba.
- 2017: Doctor honoris causa of the Southern Connecticut State University.
- 2025 : Officier de la légion d’Honneur (France)
- 2026: Platinum Konex Award in Psychoanalysis

== Bibliography ==
=== Books in English ===
- Hysteria from Freud to Lacan, Other, 1998.
- Five Lessons on the psychoanalytic theory of Jacques Lacan, SUNY, 1998.
- The book of love and pain, SUNY, 2004
- Oedipus: the most crucial concept in psychoanalysis, SUNY, 2010 (Price Choice 2011).
- A psychoanalyst on the couch, SUNY, 2012.
- Psychoanalysis and repetition: Why do we keep making the same mistakes?¸ SUNY, 2019.

=== Books in French ===
- L'Inconscient à venir, Paris, Payot, 1993
- (dir.) Aux limites du transfert, Rochevignes, 1985.
- L’Enfant du miroir, coauteur avec Françoise Dolto, Payot, 2002
- (dir.) Le Silence en psychanalyse, Payot, 2001
- Enseignement de 7 concepts cruciaux de la psychanalyse, Payot, 2001
- L'Hystérie ou l'enfant magnifique de la psychanalyse, Payot, 2001
- Cinq Leçons sur la théorie de Jacques Lacan, Payot, 2001
- (dir.) Introduction aux œuvres de Freud, Ferenczi, Groddeck, Klein, Winnicott, Dolto et Lacan, Payot, 1994
- Le Livre de la douleur et de l'amour, Payot, 2003
- Le Plaisir de lire Freud, Payot, 2001
- (dir.) Les Grands Cas de psychose, Payot, 2000
- Un psychanalyste sur le divan, Payot, 2009 (Poche)
- L’Œdipe. Le concept le plus crucial de la psychanalyse, Payot, 2012
- Le Fantasme. Le plaisir de lire Lacan, Payot, 2005
- La Douleur d’aimer, Payot, 2005
- La Douleur Physique, Payot, 2006
- Mon corps et ses Images, Payot, 2013
- Les Yeux de Laure. Nous sommes tous fous dans un recoin de notre vie, Payot, 2009
- Introduction à la Topologie de Lacan, Payot, 2010
- Comment agir avec un adolescent en crise ?, Payot, 2013
- L’Inconscient, c’est la Répétition !, Payot, 2012
- L’Inconscient de Vallotton, RMN - Grand Palais; Musée d'Orsay, 2013
- Art et psychanalyse, Payot, 2014
- Oui, la psychanalyse guérit !, Payot, 2016
- Tout le monde peut-il tomber en dépression ?, Payot, 2021.
- L’Inconscient de Vallotton, RMN-Grand Palais, 2013.
- Dix Histoires de vie, de souffrance et d'amour, Gallimard / France Inter, 2023.
- Clara, le bébé qui revient à la vie, Payot, 2024.

== English translations ==
- Book of Love and Pain: The Thinking at the Limit with Freud and Lacan. Translated by David Pettigrew and François Raffoul (Albany: SUNY Press, 2003)
- Five Lessons on the Psychoanalytic Theory of Jacques Lacan. Translated by David Pettigrew and François Raffoul (Albany: SUNY Press, 1998)
- Hysteria: The Splendid Child of Psychoanalysis. Translated by Susan Fairfield (New York: Other Press, 1998)
- Oedipus: The Most Crucial Concept in Psychoanalysis. Translated by David Pettigrew and François Raffoul (Albany: SUNY Press, 2010) - Awarded with the Choice Price (2011)
- A Psychoanalyst on the Couch. Translated by Stephanie Grace Schull, revised and edited by David Pattigrew and François Raffoul (Albany: SUNY Press, 2012)
- Why Do We Always Repeat the Same Mistakes ? Currently this book is being translated into English by David Pettigrew and François Raffoul. (Albany: SUNY Press)
