= Agneta Henriksson =

Swedish diver

Personal information
- Nationality: Swedish
- Born: 22 September 1952 (age 73) Gothenburg, Sweden

Sport
- Sport: Diving

Agneta Henriksson (born 22 September 1952) is a Swedish former diver. She competed at the 1972 Summer Olympics and the 1976 Summer Olympics.
