= Laura Kivelä =

Finnish diver (born 1952)

Personal information
- Nationality: Finnish
- Born: 4 May 1952 (age 73) Helsinki, Finland

Sport
- Sport: Diving

Laura Kivelä (born 4 May 1952) is a Finnish diver. She competed in two events at the 1972 Summer Olympics.
