= Elżbieta Wierniuk =

Polish diver

Personal information
- Nationality: Polish
- Born: 16 March 1951 Jawor, Poland
- Died: 16 September 2017 (aged 66)

Sport
- Sport: Diving
Medal record
Women's diving
Representing Poland
Summer Universiade
Bronze medal – third place	1970 Turin	3 m springboard

Elżbieta Wierniuk (16 March 1951 – 16 September 2017) was a Polish diver. She competed at the 1968 Summer Olympics and the 1972 Summer Olympics.
