= Bertha Baraldi =

Mexican diver

Personal information
- Full name: Bertha Baraldi Briseño
- Born: 3 February 1948 (age 78) Mexico City, Mexico

Sport
- Sport: Diving
Medal record
Representing Mexico
Central American and Caribbean Games
Gold medal – first place	1966 San Juan	3m springboard
Gold medal – first place	1966 San Juan	10m platform
Gold medal – first place	1970 Panama City	3m springboard
Gold medal – first place	1970 Panama City	10m platform

Bertha Baraldi Briseño (born 3 February 1948) is a Mexican diver. She competed at the 1968 Summer Olympics and the 1972 Summer Olympics.
