= Taeko Udagawa =

Japanese anthropologist

Taeko Udagawa is a Japanese anthropologist specialising in ethnographic studies of Italy and Southern Europe. She is a professor at Japan's National Museum of Ethnology in Osaka, Japan.

== Biography ==
Udagawa completed a bachelor of arts degree at the University of Tokyo in 1978, and a master's of arts degree at the same university in 1984. From 1985 to 1987 Udagawa studied cultural anthropology at the University of Rome. She was a lecturer at Chubu University and Kanazawa University before joining the National Museum of Ethnology in 2002.

== Publications ==
- Udagawa, T. (2015). Jōhekinai kara miru itaria: Jendā o toinaosu. Kyōto: Rinsenshoten.
- Udagawa, T. (2009). Tagenteki kyōsei o motomete: Shimin no shakai o tsukuru. Tōkyō: Tōshindō.
