= Brazilian Girls =

New York band

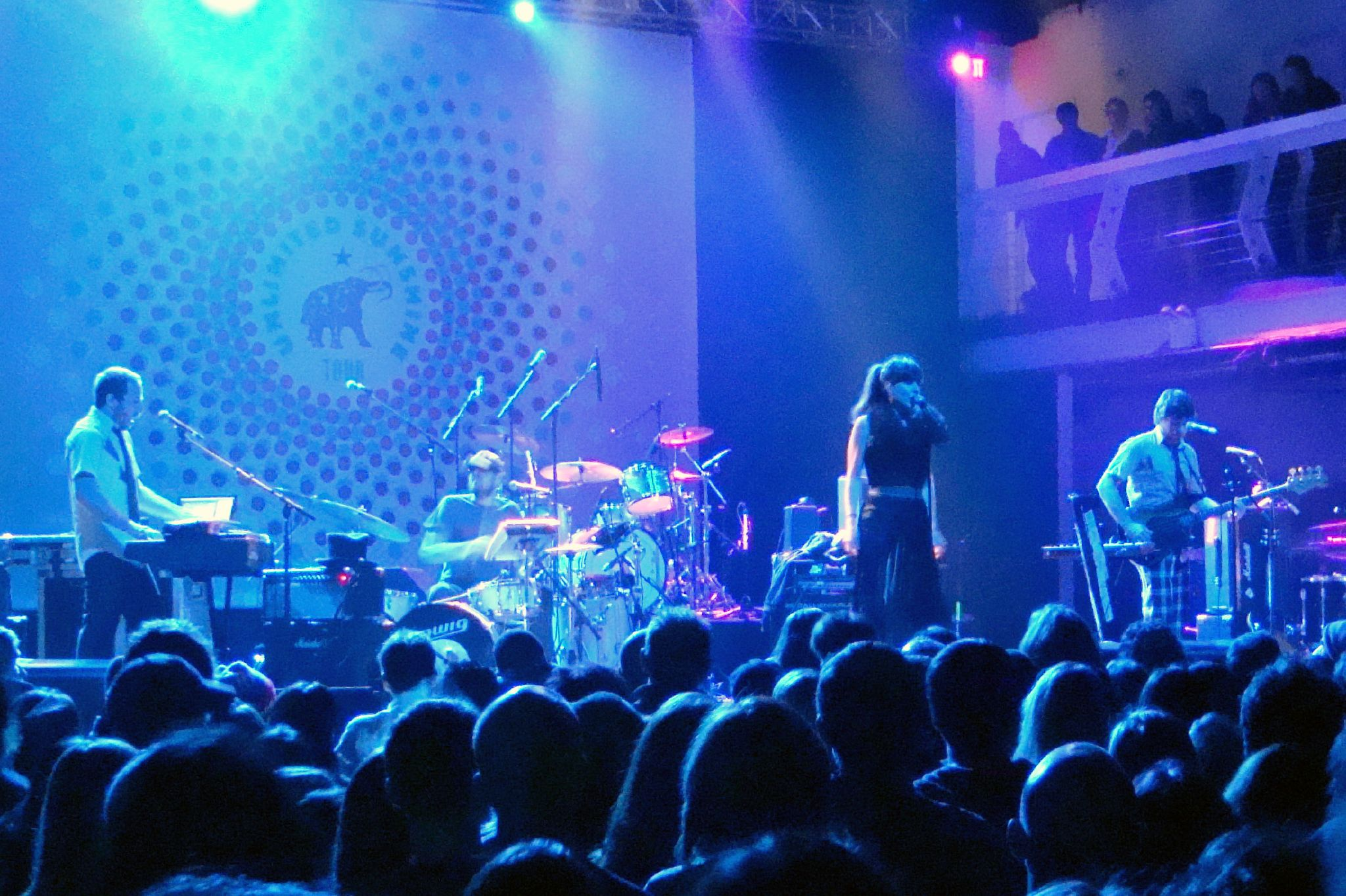
- Brazilian Girls in concert at Terminal 5 in the city of New York, December 2007

Background information
- Origin: New York, U.S.
- Genres: Electronic
- Years active: 2003–2010; 2012–2019; 2025–present
- Labels: Verve; Verve Forecast; Six Degrees
- Members: Jesse Murphy; Didi Gutman; Aaron Johnston
- Past members: Sabina Sciubba
- Website: braziliangirlsnyc.com

Brazilian Girls is an American music group from New York City, known for their eclectic blend of electronic dance music with musical styles as diverse as tango, chanson, house, reggae, samba, and lounge. Formed in 2003, the group consists of Argentine keyboardist Didi Gutman, drummer Aaron Johnston and bassist Jesse Murphy, and was formerly fronted by Italian singer Sabina Sciubba.

The band has released four studio albums: their self-titled debut on 1 February 2005, Talk to La Bomb on 12 September 2006, New York City on 5 August 2008, and Let's Make Love on 13 April 2018.

== History ==
Brazilian Girls formed in 2003, performing at New York City club Nublu. While playing weekly shows, the band wrote many of the songs that would appear on their 2005 debut album.

In 2006, the band released their second album, entitled Talk to La Bomb, featuring the single "Jique." They toured widely across the United States, Latin America and Europe, appearing on several TV shows, notably David Letterman and Jimmy Kimmel.

They also covered Talking Heads' "Crosseyed And Painless" for the AIDS benefit album Silencio=Muerte: Red Hot + Latin Redux produced by the Red Hot Organization.

Their third album, New York City, came out in 2008. They toured through October, at which time the band took a break for Sciubba to have a child. The song "Good Time" off of New York City was featured in an ad for Amstel Light.

In 2008, David Byrne appeared as a guest on their single "I'm losing myself".

In 2009, the album New York City was nominated for a Grammy Award for Best Dance/Electronica Album.

In June 2011, despite rumors of a split, Brazilian Girls collaborated with Forró in the Dark and Angélique Kidjo on the track "Aquele Abraço" for the Red Hot Organization's newest charitable album Red Hot+Rio 2. Proceeds from the sales will be donated to raise awareness and money to fight HIV/AIDS and related health and social issues.

In April 2012, the band reunited, playing live shows and recording new material.

In February 2014, Sciubba released a solo record called Toujours.

On 13 April 2018, the band released their fourth album, Let's Make Love.

The band's original lineup has not performed together 2019 and, in 2025, Brazilian Girls began releasing new music and performing as a trio without Sciubba. The group continues to work with a variety of singers and instrumentalists.

== Discography ==
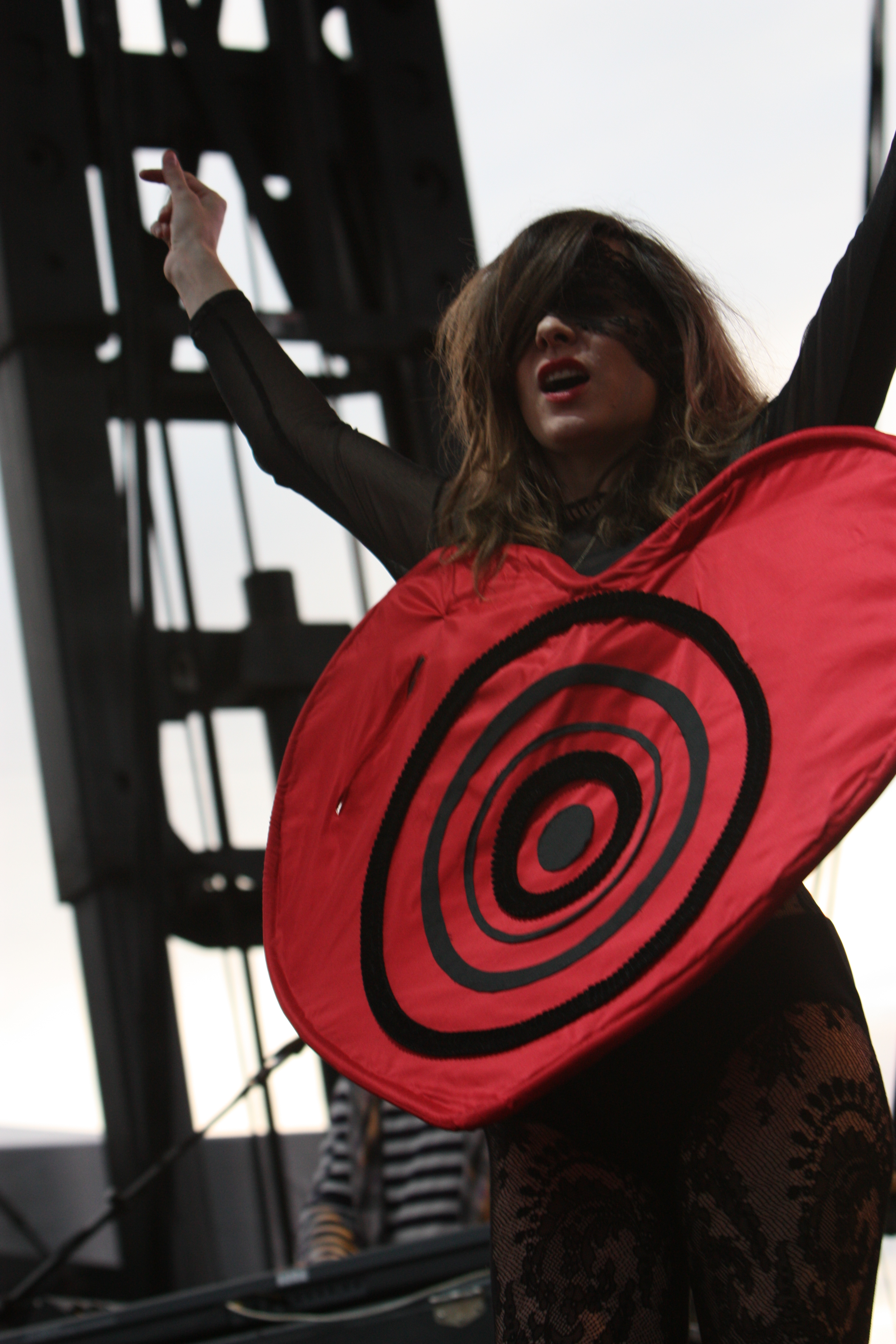
Sabina Sciubba performing with the band at the Treasure Island Music Festival 2009

=== Albums ===
- Brazilian Girls (2005)
- Talk to La Bomb (2006)
- New York City (2008)
- Let's Make Love (2018)

=== Singles and EPs ===
- Lazy Lover EP (2004)
- "Don't Stop" (2005)
- More Than Pussy – The Remix EP (2007)
- "The Critic" (2016)
- "Pirates" (2018)

=== Videos ===
- Brazilian Girls: Live in NYC (2005)
