= Carmen Belén Núñez =

Spanish diver

Personal information
- Nationality: Spanish
- Born: 25 December 1957 (age 68) Madrid, Spain

Sport
- Sport: Diving

Carmen Belén Núñez (born 25 December 1957) is a Spanish diver. She competed at the 1972 Summer Olympics, the 1976 Summer Olympics and the 1980 Summer Olympics.
