= Diving at the 1972 Summer Olympics =

Diving at the Games of the XX Olympiad
- Venue: Olympia Schwimmhalle
- Dates: 27 August 1972 through 4 September 1972
- No. of events: 4
- Competitors: 91 from 25 nations

At the 1972 Summer Olympics in Munich, four diving events were contested during a competition that took place at the Olympiapark Swimming Hall, from 27 August to 4 September (31 August, rest day), comprising 91 divers from 25 nations.

== Medal summary ==
The events are named according to the International Olympic Committee, but they appeared on the official report as "springboard diving" and "platform diving", respectively.

=== Men ===
Event	Gold	Silver	Bronze
3 m springboard	Vladimir Vasin; Soviet Union	Giorgio Cagnotto; Italy	Craig Lincoln; United States
10 m platform	Klaus Dibiasi; Italy	Richard Rydze; United States	Giorgio Cagnotto; Italy

=== Women ===
Event	Gold	Silver	Bronze
3 m springboard	Micki King; United States	Ulrika Knape; Sweden	Marina Janicke; East Germany
10 m platform	Ulrika Knape; Sweden	Milena Duchková; Czechoslovakia	Marina Janicke; East Germany

== Medal table ==
Rank	Nation	Gold	Silver	Bronze	Total
1	Italy	1	1	1	3
1	United States	1	1	1	3
3	Sweden	1	1	0	2
4	Soviet Union	1	0	0	1
5	Czechoslovakia	0	1	0	1
6	East Germany	0	0	2	2
Totals (6 entries)		4	4	4	12

== Participating nations ==
Here are listed the nations that were represented in the diving events and, in brackets, the number of national competitors.

- Australia (3)
- Austria (4)
- Canada (8)
- Colombia (2)
- Czechoslovakia (1)
- East Germany (7)
- Finland (2)
- France (3)
- Great Britain (8)
- Indonesia (1)
- Italy (2)
- Jamaica (1)
- Japan (3)
- Mexico (4)
- Netherlands (2)
- Norway (1)
- Poland (3)
- Puerto Rico (1)
- Romania (3)
- Soviet Union (9)
- Spain (2)
- Sweden (2)
- Switzerland (1)
- United States (8)
- West Germany (9)

== See also ==
- Diving at the 1971 Pan American Games
