= Ulrika Knape =

Swedish diver (born 1955)

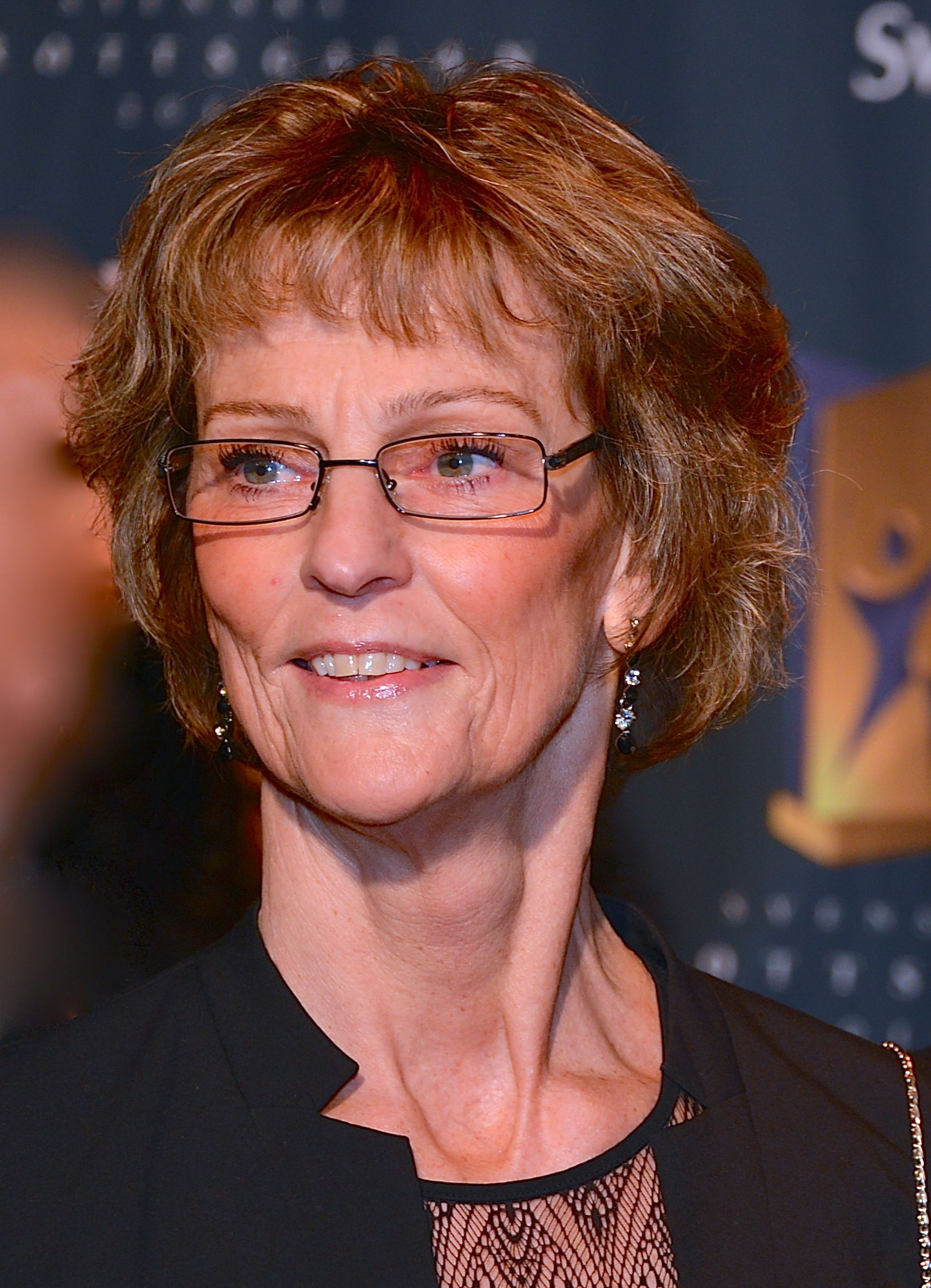
- Ulrika Knape at the Swedish Sports Awards inside the Stockholm Globe Arena in Stockholm, Sweden in January 2013

Personal information
- Full name: Ulrika Margareta Knape-Lindberg
- Nationality: Swedish
- Born: 26 April 1955 (age 71) Gothenburg, Sweden
- Height: 173 cm (5 ft 8 in)
- Weight: 60 kg (132 lb)

Sport
- Country: Sweden
- Sport: Diving
- Club: Simklubben S02, Göteborg
- Coached by: Gunnel Weinås
Medal record
Representing Sweden
Olympic Games
| Gold medal – first place | 1972 Munich | 10 m platform |
| Silver medal – second place | 1972 Munich | 3 m springboard |
| Silver medal – second place | 1976 Montréal | 10 m platform |
World Championships
| Gold medal – first place | 1973 Belgrade | Platform |
| Silver medal – second place | 1973 Belgrade | Springboard |
| Bronze medal – third place | 1975 Cali | Platform |
European Championships
| Gold medal – first place | 1974 Vienna | Springboard |
| Gold medal – first place | 1974 Vienna | Platform |

Ulrika Margareta Knape-Lindberg (née Knape on 26 April 1955) is a retired Swedish diver. She competed in the 10 m platform and 3 m springboard at the 1972 and 1976 Olympics and won one gold and two silver medals. In 1972–1974 she was named the World Platform Diver of the Year. Domestically she won 38 Swedish titles.

Knape won the Svenska Dagbladet Gold Medal in 1972, and after retiring from competitions worked as a national diving coach. She is married to the fellow diver Mathz Lindberg; their daughter Anna Lindberg competed in diving at five Olympics.

== See also ==
- List of members of the International Swimming Hall of Fame

| Preceded by Stellan Bengtsson | Svenska Dagbladet Gold Medal; 1972 | Succeeded by Rolf Edling |
