= Ursula Sapp-Möckel =

German diver

Personal information
- Nationality: German
- Born: 5 October 1951 (age 73); Eslohe, West Germany

Sport
- Sport: Diving

Ursula Sapp-Möckel (born 5 October 1951) is a German diver. She competed at the 1972 Summer Olympics and the 1976 Summer Olympics.
