= Helen Koppell =

British diver

Personal information
- Nationality: British
- Born: 15 June 1955 (age 70) Leicester, England

Sport
- Sport: Diving

Helen Koppell (born 15 June 1955) is a British diver. She competed at the 1972 Summer Olympics and the 1976 Summer Olympics.

== Early life ==
She was with the 60th Leicester Guides. She attended the Wyggeston Girls Grammar School. She was coached by Dick Koppell, her father. She lived on Queen's Road.

She acquired 9 O-levels in 1971, and took A levels, hoping to go into medicine. She studied medicine at Barts and The London School of Medicine and Dentistry. She took a year off her medicine course to prepare for the 1976 Olympics.

== Career ==
She became an anaesthetist at the Hospital for Sick Children (Toronto).

== Personal life ==
She married on Saturday 27 January 1979 to Dr Richard Holtby in London. She moved to Toronto in July 1980, to continue her studies in anaesthesia. She had her first baby in April 1986 in Canada. She had originally planned to return after five years.
