= Tetiana Shtyreva-Volynkina =

Soviet diver

Personal information
- Nationality: Soviet
- Born: 11 September 1954; Lviv, Ukrainian SSR, Soviet Union
- Died: 2008 (aged 53–54)

Sport
- Sport: Diving

Tetiana Shtyreva-Volynkina (11 September 1954 – 2008) was a Soviet diver. She competed at the 1972 Summer Olympics and the 1976 Summer Olympics.
