= Milena Duchková =

Czech diver

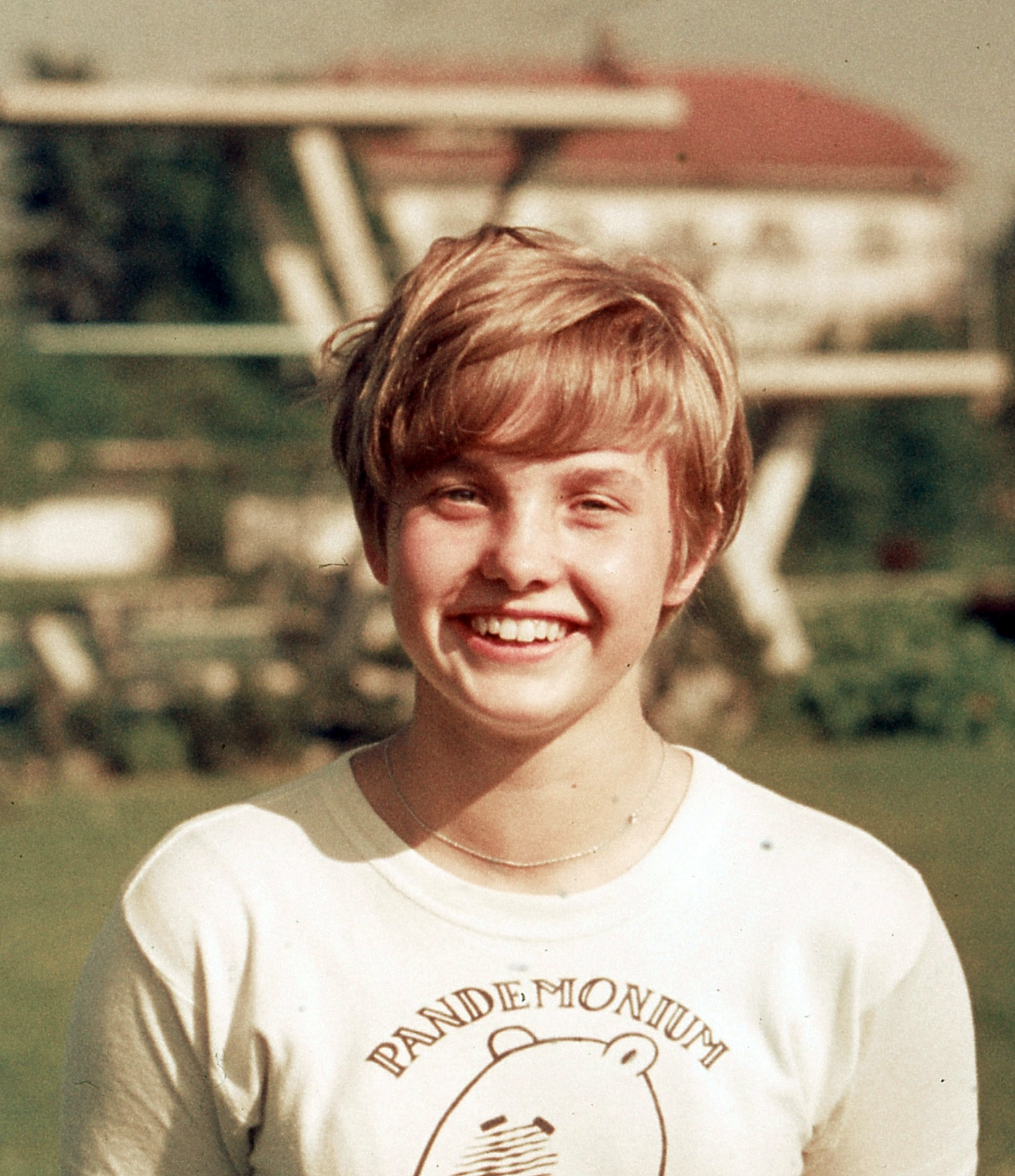

Personal information
- Born: 25 April 1952 (age 74) Prague, Czechoslovakia

Sport
- Sport: Diving
Medal record
Representing Czechoslovakia
Olympic Games
Gold medal – first place	1968 Mexico City	Platform
Silver medal – second place	1972 Munich	Platform
World Championships
Silver medal – second place	1973 Belgrade	Platform
European Championships
Gold medal – first place	1970 Barcelona	Platform
Universiade
Gold medal – first place	1973 Moscow	Platform
Silver medal – second place	1973 Moscow	Springboard

Milena Duchková (born 25 April 1952) is a Czech diver. She competed at the 1968 Summer Olympics in Mexico City, where she received a gold medal in Platform Diving. She received a silver medal in 1972.

== Personal life ==
In late 1980, Duchková applied for permanent Canadian residency, along with her husband Petr Neveklovsky, then 33 years old and 22-month-old daughter Misa. Although her husband could only speak very little English, he was a highly regarded volleyball coach. Outside of diving, Duchková was also registered as a doctor, dentist and an oral surgeon, with hopes to open her own practice in Newfoundland following acceptance of their residency application. The family were concerned about raising their daughter in Czechoslovakia, according to her diving coach Don Webb, who had arranged for her one-year visa in Canada.

After Duchková emigrated to Canada, the communist regime in Czechoslovakia reportedly falsely declared that she had died, and broadcast a media report with her fake grave in Olšany Cemetery.

== Awards ==
She was inducted into the International Swimming Hall of Fame in Fort Lauderdale, Florida in 1983.

== See also ==
- List of members of the International Swimming Hall of Fame
