= Deaths in August 1986 =

The following is a list of notable deaths in August 1986.

Entries for each day are listed alphabetically by surname. A typical entry lists information in the following sequence:

- Name, age, country of citizenship at birth, subsequent country of citizenship (if applicable), reason for notability, cause of death (if known), and reference.

== August 1986 ==
=== 1 ===
- Carlo Confalonieri, 93, Italian Roman Catholic cardinal, Dean of the College of Cardinals.
- Paul Detlefsen, 86, Danish-born American commercial artist (The Adventures of Mark Twain).
- Marion Grant, 68, American historian and writer, sister of Katharine Hepburn, heart attack.
- Ignatius Joseph Kasimo Hendrowahyono, 86, Indonesian politician, Minister of Trade and Agriculture.
- James Horan, 75, Irish Roman Catholic priest.
- Lena Kennedy, 72, English author.
- Willem Klein, 73, Dutch mental calculator, murdered.
- Syd Negus, 74, Australian politician, senator for Western Australia.
- Ken Roskie, 65, American NFL player.
- Robert Wolfgang Schnell, 70, German writer.
- José María Vidal, 51, Spanish footballer (Real Madrid, Spain), heart attack.

=== 2 ===
- Aligholi Ardalan, 86, Iranian diplomat, Minister of Foreign Affairs.
- Sunil Banerjee, 66, Indian cricket umpire.
- Roy Cohn, 59, American lawyer and prosecutor, Joseph McCarthy's chief counsel, prosecuted Julius and Ethel Rosenberg, AIDS.
- Renato Leduc, 88, Mexican poet and journalist.
- Shakti Prasad, 58, Indian Kannada actor (Immadi Pulikeshi, Antha).

=== 3 ===
- George Agnost, 63, American attorney, cardiac arrest.
- Paul de Groot, 87, Dutch politician, member of the House of Representatives, leader of the Communist Party.
- Otmar Emminger, 75, German economist, president of the Deutsche Bundesbank, heart attack.
- Brian Flynn, 57, Australian cricketer.
- Thad Hutcheson, 70, American attorney.
- George Kuznets, 77, American economist (agricultural economics).
- Beryl Markham, 83, British-born Kenyan aviator, first to fly solo non-stop across the Atlantic from Britain to North America (West with the Night).
- Carl Mork, 79, South African-born Australian rugby league footballer.
- Y. Eswara Reddy, 70–71, Indian politician, member of Lok Sabha, leader of the Communist Party of India.
- Florence Reece, 86, American social activist and songwriter ("Which Side Are You On?"), heart attack.
- František Šembera, 81, Czech Olympic equestrian (1960).
- Rupert de Smidt, 102, South African cricketer.
- Hudson Tannis, 58, Vicentian politician, deputy prime minister of Saint Vicent and the Grenadines (1980-1984), plane crash.
- Joe Thomas, 77, American jazz saxophonist.
- William B. Williams, 62, American disc jockey (WNEW, Make Believe Ballroom), coined "Chairman of the Board" for Frank Sinatra, respiratory failure.

=== 4 ===
- Bennie J. George, 67, American coach (Delaware State University).
- Harry Giles, 74, Australian rules footballer.
- Charles Haworth, 79, American Olympic long-distance runner (1928).
- Hyllus Maris, 52, Australian Aboriginal rights activist (Women of the Sun), cancer.
- Bob Roggy, 29, American javelin thrower, fall.
- Roger Rouge, 72, Swiss Olympic sailor (1964).
- Willem Ruis, 41, Dutch game show presenter, cardiac arrest.
- Thomas J. Valentino, 79, Italian-born American businessman, compiled libraries of sound effects.

=== 5 ===
- John Alexander, 90, American football player.
- Ferenc Cziráki, 72, Hungarian Olympic handball player. (1936).
- Banesh Hoffmann, 79, British-born American physicist and mathematician (Einstein–Infeld–Hoffmann equations).
- Lester Lautenschlaeger, 82, American football player (Tulane) and politician.
- Emanuel Löffler, 84, Czech Olympic gymnast (1928, 1936).
- Katharine Krom Merritt, 100, American physician specializing in pediatrics (Kasabach–Merritt syndrome).
- Luciana Peverelli, 84, Italian writer and journalist.
- Himzo Polovina, 59, Bosnian singer and songwriter, heart attack.
- George Poyser, 71, Australian politician, member of the Australian Senate (1966-1975).
- Karl Streibel, 82, German concentration camp commander (Trawniki concentration camp),

=== 6 ===
- Alessandro Catalani, 81, Italian cyclist.
- Maria Dunin, 87, Polish painter.
- Emilio Fernández, 82, Mexican film director, actor and screenwriter (María Candelaria), heart attack.
- Harry H. Johnson, 91, American army general.
- Philomé Obin, 94, Haitian painter.
- Jorge Vieira, 87, Portuguese Olympic footballer (1928).
- Kim Williams, 62, American writer, naturalist and commentator on National Public Radio (All Things Considered), cancer.
- Beppe Wolgers, 57, Swedish lyricist and author, peptic ulcer.
- Lou Zontini, 68, American NFL player.

=== 7 ===
- Anne Bahlke, 83, American physician.
- Leonard Arthur Hawes, British army officer.
- Ladislav Hojer, 28, Czech serial killer, executed.
- Alfred Jones, 86, English cricketer.
- William J. Schroeder, 54, American soldier and artificial heart recipient, lung infection.
- Julie Tullis, 47, British climber and filmmaker, died during descent of K2.

=== 8 ===
- Paul G. Chandler, 96, American coach, educator, and college president (Kent State University).
- Yehoshua Cohen, 64, Israeli Zionist militant (Lehi), assassinated two U.N. envoys, heart attack.
- Giovanni Garaventa, 86, Italian Olympic middle-distance runner (1924).
- Ella Lillian Wall Van Leer, 93, American architect and women's rights activist.
- Lowell A. Nelson, 68, American politician, member of the Wisconsin State Assembly (1957-1958).

=== 9 ===
- Harold Ave, 86, American basketball and football coach.
- Angelo Congear, 101, Australian rules footballer.
- Clarence Maddern, 64, American Major League Baseball player (Chicago Cubs, Cleveland Indians).
- Eoin McNamee, 71–72, Irish Republican, Chief of Staff of the Irish Republican Army, cancer.
- Salvador Nocetti, 73, Argentine-born Chilean footballer and manager.
- Gustav Adolf Nosske, 83, German lawyer and convicted war criminal.
- Jef Scherens, 77, Belgian track cyclist, multiple world champion.
- Ignaz Sigl, 84, Austrian footballer.
- Ruth Teitelbaum, 62, American mathematician and computer programmer, original ENIAC programmer.

=== 10 ===
- Arthur Capell, 84, Australian linguist (Australian and Austronesian languages).
- Paraskeva Clark, 87, Russian-born Canadian painter, stroke.
- Vratislav Effenberger, 63, Czech writer.
- Lyle Engel, 71, American magazine publisher and book producer.
- Jacqueline Gadsden, 86, American silent-screen actress (It).
- K. C. George, 83, Indian politician, member of Rajya Sabha, Minister for Food and Forests.
- Luther Carrington Goodrich, 91, American sinologist and author.
- Tom Greenwade, 81, American Major League baseball scout, heart failure.
- Holger Guldager, 81, Danish Olympic cyclist (1924).
- John H. Hamilton Jr., 67, American politician, member of the Pennsylvania House of Representatives (1965-1978).
- Guy H. Jones, 75, American politician and lawyer.
- Palapatti Sadaya Goundar Kailasam, 70, Indian jurist, judge of the Supreme Court of India.
- Don McRae, 71, New Zealand cricketer and footballer.
- Alan Rouse, 34, British mountaineer, died on descent from K2.
- Jon Snersrud, 83, Norwegian Olympic skier (1928).
- Arun Shridhar Vaidya, 60, Indian army general, assassinated.

=== 11 ===
- Karl Duldig, 83, Polish-born Australian sculptor.
- Bud Edwards, 78, American football player.
- Tom Gorman, 67, American Major League baseball player (New York Giants) and umpire, heart attack.
- Peter Mahon, 62, New Zealand High Court judge, heart failure.
- Chuck McKinley, 45, American tennis player, multiple U.S. Open winner, brain tumour.
- Hans-Joachim Riecke, 87, Nazi German politician.
- Heinz Strehl, 48, West German footballer (FC Nürnberg, West Germany), heart failure.

=== 12 ===
- Howard Finn, 68, American city planner and architect, heart attack.
- Benjamin Frank, 66-67, Indian cricketer.
- Howard Jarvis, 82, American politician, businessman and lobbyist, blood disease.
- Leroy Lins, 73, American basketball player.
- Paola Mori, 57, Italian actress, wife of Orson Welles, traffic collision.
- Léonard Mulamba, 57–58, Zairian politician and diplomat, prime minister of Congo-Léopoldville, ambassador to three countries.
- Evaline Ness, 75, American children's author (Sam, Bangs & Moonshine), heart attack.
- Louis Peglion, 80, French road bicycle racer.
- Hans Pesser, 74, Austrian footballer (Rapid Wien, Austria).
- Felix Salzer, 82, Austrian-American musicologist.

=== 13 ===
- Jean Bailhache, 75, French writer and translator.
- Way Bandy, 45, American makeup artist, AIDS.
- Pius Anthony Benincasa, 73, American auxiliary bishop.
- Joe Bolton, 75, American television and radio personality (WPIX – The Dick Tracy Show), heart attack.
- Pepper Constable, 72, American football player and doctor, drowned.
- Anna Dodas i Noguer, 23, Spanish Catalan poet, murdered.
- Víctor García Garzena, 72, Chilean lawyer and politician, member of the Senate of Chile (1969-1973).
- Caterina Jarboro, 88, American opera singer.
- Avraham Katz, 54-55, Israeli politician.
- Janko Lavrin, 99, Slovenian-born British novelist and historian.
- Helen Mack, 72, American actress (While Paris Sleeps, Son of Kong), cancer.
- Mãe Menininha do Gantois, 92, Brazilian spiritual leader, head of the Ilê Axé Iyá Omin Iyamassê temple.
- Kapur Singh, 77, Indian Sikh politician, member of the Lok Sabha.

=== 14 ===
- Jomí García Ascot, 59, Tunisian-born Mexican poet and film director.
- Charlie Greenhill, 84, Australian rules footballer.
- Michael Lawrence Haider, 81, American petroleum engineer, founder of the National Academy of Engineering and chairman of Exxon Coorporation.
- Henry Kristian Larsen, 72, Danish Olympic field hockey player (1936).
- Stjepan Ljubić, 80, Yugoslav Olympic cyclist (1928).

=== 15 ===
- Alexander Barras, 72, Australian cricketer.
- Billy Libbis, 83, Australian rules footballer.
- Winthrop Sargeant, 82, American violinist and music critic (The New Yorker).
- John Trevelyan, 83, English secretary of the Board of the British Board of Film Censors.
- Harald Wiberg, 78, Swedish writer and illustrator.

=== 16 ===
- Ronnie Aird, 84, British army officer and cricketer.
- Patrick Beesly, 73, British intelligence officer and author.
- Reginald Fenderson, 74, American actor.
- Sonia Rosemary Keppel, 86, British author and socialite, grandmother of Queen Camilla.
- John Maude, 85, British judge and politician, member of the House of Commons.
- William T. Pheiffer, 88, American politician and diplomat, member of the U.S. House of Representatives, ambassador to the Dominican Republic.
- Ryan Price, 74, British racehorse trainer.
- Jaime Sáenz, 64, Bolivian poet, novelist and journalist.
- Esther Shemitz, 86, American painter (Hiss case).
- Nikolaos Syllas, 71, Greek Olympic discus thrower (1936, 1948, 1952).

=== 17 ===
- M. G. Chakrapani, 75, Indian actor and film producer (Mahamaya, Thaai Magalukku Kattiya Thaali).
- Shipwreck Kelly, 76, American NFL footballer (Brooklyn Dodgers), stroke.
- Walt Lanfranconi, 69, American Major League Baseball player (Chicago Cubs, Boston Braves).
- Charles Loewen, 85, Canadian-born British army general.
- Luis Pasarín, 84, Spanish footballer, manager, and Olympian (1924).
- Sammy Vick, 91, American Major League baseball player (New York Yankees).

=== 18 ===
- Harun Babunagari, 83-84, Bangladeshi Islamic scholar and educationist.
- Bruce F. Beilfuss, 71, American lawyer and jurist.
- Vivian Stuart, 72, British writer.

=== 19 ===
- Hermione Baddeley, 79, English actress (Room at the Top, The Milk Train Doesn't Stop Here Anymore, The Aristocats), stroke.
- Wilfred Beaver, 89, British and American flying ace.
- Hugo Brouwer, 73, Dutch artist.
- Jaap Burger, 81, Dutch politician, member of the European Parliament.
- Hugh De Lacy, 76, American politician, member of the U.S. House of Representatives (1945-1947), cancer.
- John Donnelly, 81, Canadian Olympic coxswain (1928).
- Zia Fatehabadi, 73, Indian poet.
- Gérard Gasiorowski, 56, French photographer and painter, heart attack.
- Raphael Glorieux, 57, Belgian Olympic cyclist (1948).
- Lorenzo Tucker, 79, American actor, lung cancer.

=== 20 ===
- Milton Acorn, 63, Canadian poet and playwright, heart attack.
- Barbara Bartay, 65, Czech-born American actress, colorectal cancer.
- Walter Brooke, 71, American actor (The Graduate), emphysema.
- Joy Bright Hancock, 88, American naval officer.
- Edward Howell, 84, British-Australian actor and producer (A Country Practice).
- Thad Jones, 63, American jazz trumpeter, composer and bandleader, cancer.
- Vichna Kaplan, 72–73, Russian-born American academic administrator.
- Gauriprasanna Mazumder, 60, Indian lyricist (Palatak).
- Zygmunt Menkes, 90, Polish painter.
- George Rainbird, 81, British publisher.
- Abdur Rashid Tarkabagish, 85, Bangladeshi politician, president of Awami League.
- Austin Warren, 87, American literary critic and professor of English.

=== 21 ===
- Bata, 78, Spanish footballer (Athletic Bilbao, Spain).
- Armando Bréa, 87, Brazilian Olympic middle-distance runner (1932).
- William C. Chase, 91, American World War II general.
- Chaim Levanon, 87, Polish-born Israeli politician, mayor of Tel Aviv.
- Felix Mitchell, 31, American drug lord, murdered.
- Alexandre O'Neill, 61, Portuguese writer.
- Roscoe Charles Wilson, 81, American air force general, commandant of the USAF Air War College.

=== 22 ===
- Vali Akhundov, 70, Azerbaijani politician, first secretary of the Azerbaijan Communist Party.
- Lamb Barbee, 70, American Negro League baseball player.
- Celâl Bayar, 103, Turkish politician, prime minister and president.
- Jacques Bonnet, 47, French Olympic field hockey player (1960).
- Ed Carrington, 41, American football player (Houston Oilers), rock climbing accident.
- Bruce Cowling, 66, American actor.
- Charlie Eckert, 89, American Major League baseball player (Philadelphia Athletics).
- Dots Johnson, 73, American actor (Paisan, The Joe Louis Story).
- Walter T. Kelley, 88–89, American beekeeper.
- Sobha Singh, 84, Indian painter.
- F. Palmer Weber, 72, American businessman and activist.

=== 23 ===
- Lloyd Budd, 72, English cricketer.
- Bill Callihan, 70, American National Football League player (Detroit Lions).
- Eric Cook, 77, Canadian politician.
- Ben C. Duniway, 78, American judge, judge of the United States Court of Appeals for the Ninth Circuit (1961-1986).
- José Estrada, 48, Mexican director and screenwriter (Mexican, You Can Do It).
- Bill Evans, 87, American Negro Leagues baseball player.
- Adrienne Fazan, 80, American film editor (An American in Paris, Gigi).
- Donald Fortier, 39, American intelligence agent (National Security Council), cancer.
- Herman H. Hanneken, 93, American Marine Corps general, Medal of Honor recipient.
- Mikhail Kuznetsov, 68, Soviet actor (Ivan the Terrible).
- Warren P. Mason, 85, American electrical engineer, physicist and author.
- Sid Meehl, 72, Australian rules footballer.
- Eduardo Quisumbing, 90, Filipino botanist.

=== 24 ===
- Germaine Acremant, 97, French novelist and playwright.
- Harry Benjamin, 101, German-American sexologist and endocrinologist (transgender studies).
- John P. Caufield, 67, American politician, member of the New Jersey Senate, fire director for the Newark Fire Department.
- George Diehl, 68, American Major League Baseball player (Boston Braves).
- George Palmer, 83, Australian cricketer.
- Joe Tarto, 84, American jazz tubist and bassist.

=== 25 ===
- Ronald Bates, 54, American ballet lighting designer, heart attack.
- Allen Case, 51, American actor (The Deputy), heart attack.
- Bernie Elsey, 79–80, Australian entrepreneur and property developer, cancer.
- Amos Kent, 84, American college football player (Sewanee).
- M. Stanley Livingston, 81, American physicist, co-inventor of the cyclotron, associate director of the National Accelerator Laboratory, prostate cancer.
- Syed Hasan Mahmood, 63, Pakistani politician and cricket administrator, Chief Minister of Bahawalpur State.
- Mary Moody Northen, 94, American financier and philanthropist, chairman of the board for American National Insurance Company and Moody National Bank.
- David Rabinovitz, 78, American jurist.
- Fernando Vaz, 68, Portuguese footballer and manager (Casa Pia).

=== 26 ===
- Raymond Abellio, 78, French writer.
- Baldric, 25, American-born French Thoroughbred racehorse.
- Clarence Berryman, 80, American Olympic wrestler (1928).
- Elsie M. Burrows, 72, English botanist.
- Marion Fyfe, 88, New Zealand zoologist.
- Hu Harries, 64, Canadian politician.
- Thomas Harpur, 70, New Zealand cricketer.
- Marvin Hatley, 81, American film composer (Hal Roach Studio).
- Walther Hess, 86, German cricketer.
- Ted Knight, 62, American actor (The Mary Tyler Moore Show, Caddyshack, Too Close for Comfort), colon cancer.
- Sándor von Korompay, 74, Hungarian Olympic rower (1936).
- Kent T. Lundgren, 72, American politician.
- Allan Parkhill, 74, New Zealand rugby player.
- Mutsuo Sugiura, 68, Japanese engineer.
- Rosa Torras, 91, Spanish Olympic tennis player (1924).
- Harleigh Trecker, 75, American social work academic and administrator.

=== 27 ===
- Snehansu Kanta Acharya, 72, Indian politician.
- Georgy Agzamov, 31, Soviet chess player, fall.
- Daniel Fignolé, 72, Haitian politician, provisional president (1957).
- Bernard Fonlon, 61, Cameroonian politician and educator.
- Edward Ford, 84, Australian physician.
- Eddie Hinson, 73, Australian rugby league player.
- Joyce Mansour, 58, Egyptian-French poet, cancer.
- Dragutin Mitić, 68, Yugoslav-American tennis player.
- George Nēpia, 81, New Zealand rugby union and rugby league player.
- Alfred Pilkington, 85, English cricketer.
- Paul Sciacca, 77, American mobster (Bonanno crime family).
- Olga Šilhánová, 65, Czech Olympic gymnast (1948).
- Robbie Wijting, 61, Dutch general.

=== 28 ===
- Giorgi Chitaia, 95, Soviet Georgian ethnographer.
- Arthur Cunliffe, 77, English footballer.
- Alexander Dolgun, 59, American writer and Gulag survivor, kidney failure.
- Russell Lee, 83, American photographer.
- Don Simmons, 68, Australian politician.
- Elvi Sinervo, 74, Finnish writer.
- Cyril Trailor, 67, Welsh footballer.
- Philippe Valois, 79, Canadian politician.

=== 29 ===
- Ellis Achong, 82, Trinidad and Tobago cricketer.
- Giles Baring, 76, English cricketer.
- Alfred Fagon, 49, British playwright, heart attack.
- L. Raymond Fennell, 92, Canadian politician.
- Roy King, 82, American painter and sculptor.
- Vladimir Kuznetsov, 55, Soviet Olympic javelin thrower (1952, 1956, 1964).
- Lu Shijia, 75, Chinese physicist and aerospace engineer.
- Sax Mallard, 70, American jazz musician, cancer.
- Harold Matthews, 83, Australian rules footballer.
- Col Mitchell, 72, Australian rules footballer.
- Alex Munro, 74, Scottish footballer.
- Ronald Taylor, 77, English cricketer.
- Stuart Young, 52, English business executive.

=== 30 ===
- Margaret Wood Bancroft, 93, American naturalist.
- Forrest E. Everhart, 64, American soldier, Medal of Honor recipient.
- Thomas Kilbride, 75, Irish politician.
- Walter Kutschmann, 72, German-Argentine Einsatzkommando and war criminal, heart attack.
- Edward P. Larkin, 71, American politician.
- Aldo Longinotti, 76, Italian Olympic boxer (1932).
- Otto Mortensen, 79, Danish composer.
- George Pelawa, 18, American ice hockey player, traffic collision.
- Dame Annabelle Rankin, 78, Australian politician.
- John Tuggle, 25, American NFL football player (New York Giants), cancer.
- Bernice T. Van der Vries, 96, American politician.
- Gordon Webber, 73, American writer.

=== 31 ===
- Carl Alberg, 85, Swedish boat designer.
- Jorge Alessandri, 90, Chilean politician, president (1958–1964).
- Edward Buehrig, 75, American political scientist.
- Elizabeth Coatsworth, 93, American author (The Cat Who Went to Heaven).
- Henry Moore, 88, English sculptor.
- Urho Kekkonen, 85, Finnish politician, president (1956–1982) and prime minister (1950–1953, 1954–1956).
- Goffredo Parise, 56, Italian writer and journalist.
- Čestmír Řanda, 62, Czech actor.
