= George Palmer =

George Palmer may refer to:

== Politicians ==
- George Palmer (MP for South Essex) (1772–1853), English businessman, politician, and philanthropist
- George Hastings Palmer (1881–1947), politician of Manitoba, Canada
- George Palmer (British Army officer) (1857–1932), British Conservative Party politician
- George M. Palmer (1857–?), American politician from New York
- George William Palmer (British politician) (1851–1913), British politician
- George William Palmer (New York politician) (1818–1916), American politician
- George W. Palmer (Virginia politician) (1894–1972), American state senator from Virginia

== Sportsmen ==
- George Palmer (rugby league) rugby league footballer of the 1950s, for Batley and England
- George Palmer (Australian cricketer) (1903–1986), Australian cricketer
- George Palmer (Warwickshire cricketer) (1897–1962), English cricketer, played for Warwickshire in 1928
- George Palmer (Leicestershire cricketer) (1917–2012), English cricketer, played for Leicestershire and South Australia
- George Palmer (Australian footballer) (1879–1956), Australian rules footballer
- Joey Palmer (George Eugene Palmer, 1859–1910), Australian Test cricketer

== Others ==
- George Palmer (bushranger) (c. 1846–1869), Australian bushranger
- George Palmer (businessman) (1818–1897), Quaker entrepreneur and biscuit manufacturer of Reading, England
- George Palmer (colour theorist) (c. 1746–1826), English dye chemist, colour theorist, inventor, and soldier
- George Palmer (EastEnders), fictional character in the BBC soap opera EastEnders
- George Palmer (composer) (born 1947), Australian classical composer and judge of the NSW Supreme Court
- George A. Palmer (1895–1981), American clergyman and broadcaster
- George Carnegie Palmer, American architect
- George Henry Palmer (1840–1901), bugler during the American Civil War
- George Herbert Palmer (1842–1933), American author and philosopher
- George Josiah Palmer (1828–1892), English founder of Church Times
- George Palmer (lieutenant colonel), South Australian colonisation commissioner, son of George Palmer, MP for South Essex, above
