= Hubert Howe Bancroft =

American historian and ethnologist (1832–1918)

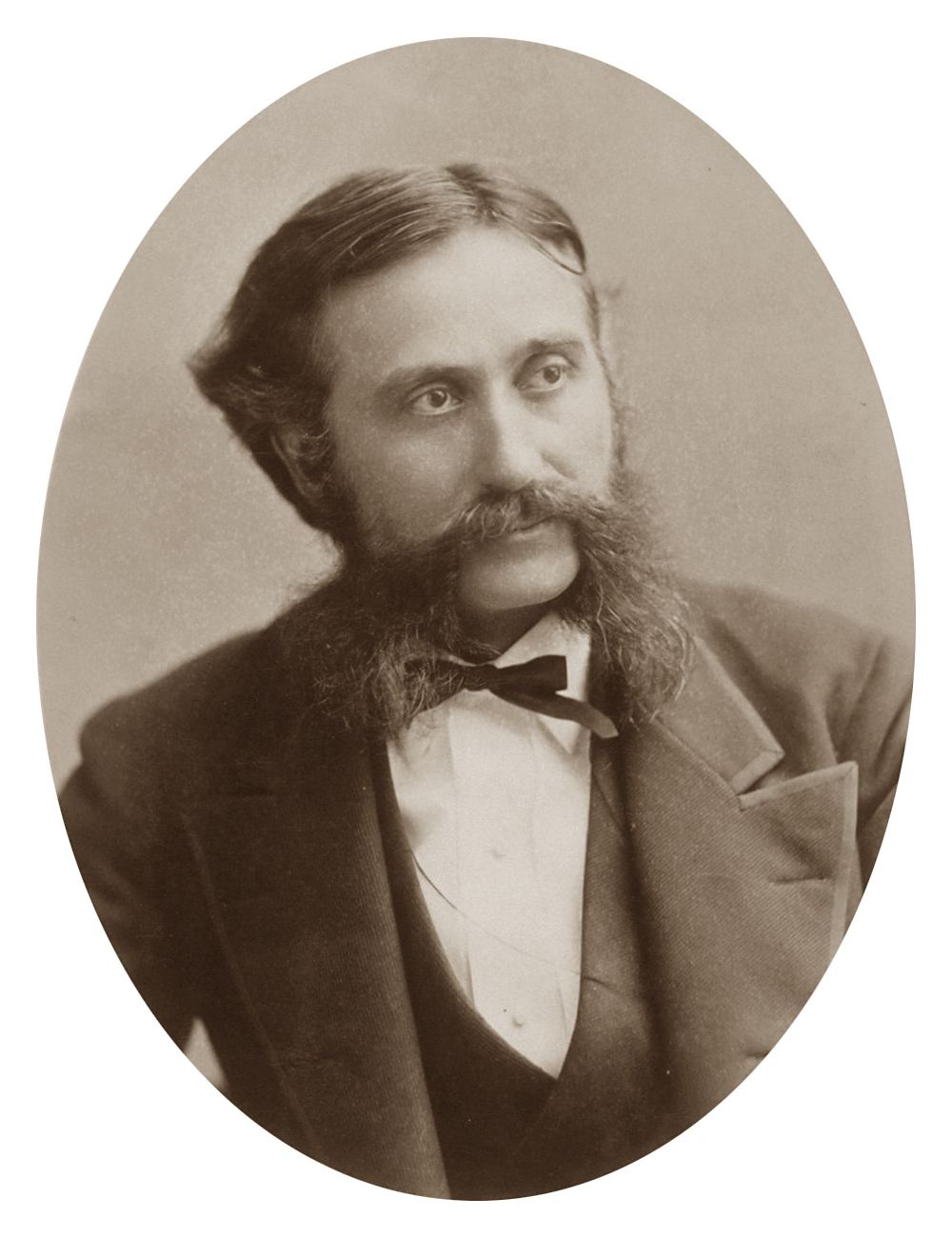
- Born: May 5, 1832; Granville, Ohio, US
- Died: March 2, 1918 (aged 85); Walnut Creek, California, US
- Occupation: Historian
- Known for: Early histories of the North American west

Hubert Howe Bancroft (May 5, 1832 – March 2, 1918) was an American historian and ethnologist who wrote, published, and collected works concerning the Western United States, Texas, California, Alaska, Mexico, Central America, and British Columbia.

== Life ==
=== Early life ===
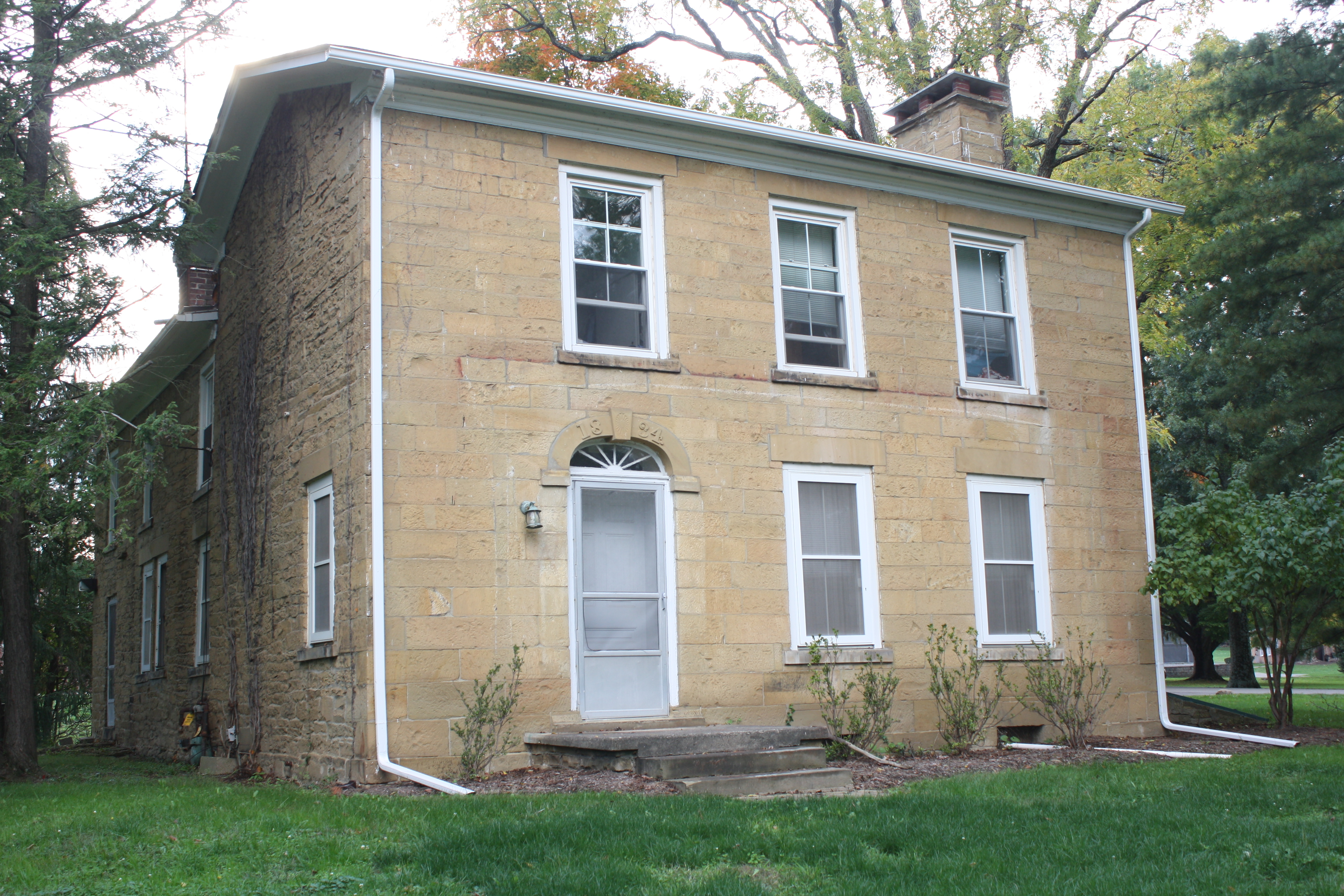
Bancroft Birthplace, Granville, Ohio

Hubert Howe Bancroft was born on May 5, 1832, in Granville, Ohio, to Azariah Ashley Bancroft and Lucy Howe Bancroft. The Howe and Bancroft families originally hailed from the New England states of Vermont and Massachusetts, respectively. Bancroft's parents were staunch abolitionists and the family home was a station on the Underground Railroad.

Bancroft attended the Doane Academy in Granville for a year, and he then became a clerk in his brother-in-law's bookstore in Buffalo, New York.

=== Move to California ===
"The Boss Historian," a caricature of Bancroft published in The Wasp, April 18, 1885

In March 1852, Bancroft was provided with an inventory of books to sell and was sent to the booming California city of San Francisco to set up a West Coast regional office of the firm. Bancroft was successful in building his company, entering the world of publishing in the process. He also became a serious collector of books, building a collection numbering into the tens of thousands of volumes.

In 1868, he resigned from his business in favor of his brother, A. L. Bancroft. He had accumulated a great library of historical material and abandoned business to devote himself entirely to writing and publishing history.

Bancroft's library consisted of books, maps, and printed and manuscript documents, including a large number of narratives dictated to Bancroft or his assistants by pioneers, settlers, and statesmen. The indexing of the vast collection employed six persons for ten years. The library was moved in 1881 to a fireproof building and, in 1900, numbered about 45,000 volumes.

He developed a plan to publish a history in 39 volumes of the entire Pacific coast region of North America, from Central America to Alaska. He employed writers and wrote some of the material himself, though he credited only himself as an author. In 1886, the publishing establishment of A. L. Bancroft & Company burned, and the sheets of seven volumes of the history he had written were destroyed.

=== Personal life ===
Bancroft's first marriage was to Emily Ketchum in 1859. They had one child, a daughter named Kate who was born in 1859. Emily died in childbirth in 1869. In 1879, Bancroft married his second wife, Matilda Coley Griffing, with whom he had four children.

Although he never graduated from college, in 1875 Bancroft was awarded an honorary Master of Arts degree from Yale in recognition of his massive historical work on Native Races of the Pacific States. He was also elected a member of the American Antiquarian Society in 1875.

=== Death ===
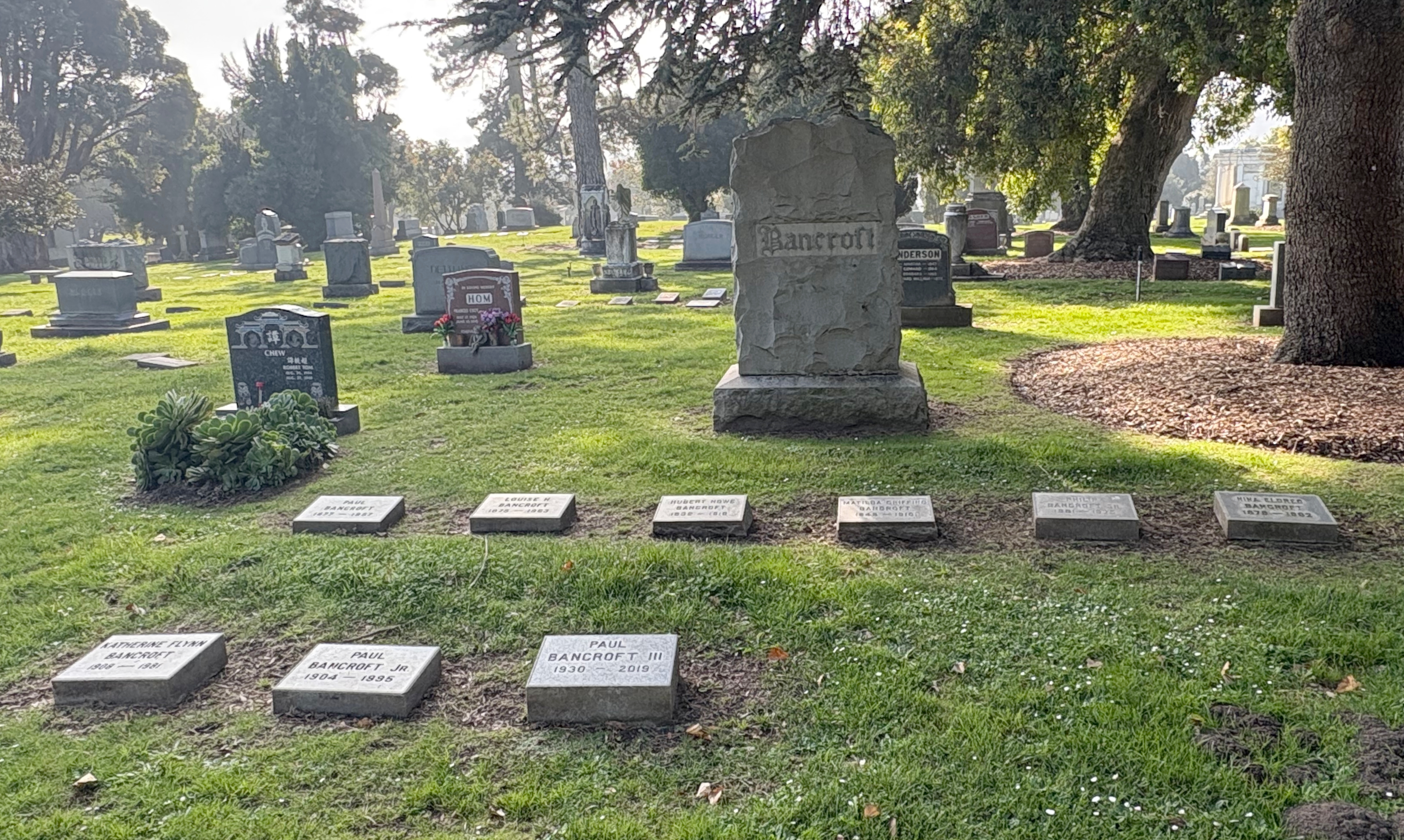
Bancroft's grave at Cypress Lawn Memorial Park

He died on March 2, 1918, at his country home in Walnut Creek, California. "Acute peritonitis" was blamed as the cause of death in published newspaper reports. Bancroft was 85 at his death. His body was interred in the Cypress Lawn Memorial Park in Colma, California.

== Writing and views ==
Bancroft often published writing by others under his own name, fitting others' writing into a narrative of history as Bancroft saw it. This "literary factory" style of production resulted in writing of uneven quality. By modern standards Bancroft would not be considered the author of many of the works he attributed to himself; he often failed to give adequate credit to the contributing writers. Bancroft's staff copied and summarized material in archives throughout California and the Southwest, and collected oral histories. The result was 39 volumes of history attributed to Bancroft.

Mariano Guadalupe Vallejo served as Bancroft's contact among the Californios. Based on interviews, Vallejo produced a five-volume work of history for Bancroft. Vallejo was disappointed by how Bancroft used the work, subsuming the stories of Mexicans into a master narrative organized around the Gold Rush. Bancroft tried to purchase the writing of historian Antonio María Osio, who refused to sell so that Bancroft could not credit himself as the author of her work.

Complete set of Hubert Bancroft's books

=== Conflicting views ===
Bancroft's personal views appear conflicted and are difficult to know exactly because he published writing by others under his own name. According to the Bancroft Library:

Bancroft's writings and work are riddled with contradictions, tensions, and ambiguities. For instance, while using the racist language of the day to discuss Chinese immigrants in the United States, Bancroft also opposed Chinese exclusion and spent pages of Retrospection excoriating Denis Kearney, one of the leaders of the anti-Chinese campaign in California. In a similar vein, he wrote unquestionably bigoted and offensive things about African Americans, while at the same time holding "anti-slavery" perspectives and coming from an abolitionist family. He was similarly dismissive of women, and yet interviewed Californio and Mormon women as part of his history project.

— Bancroft Library Reckoning Committee Final Report, UC Berkeley Chancellor's office, 2025

Bancroft's writing expressed support for vigilance committees in the West. Bancroft celebrated "the honor of the first popular tribunal of the placer mining epoch" in Hangtown, a place named for its many vigilante lynchings.

== Legacy ==
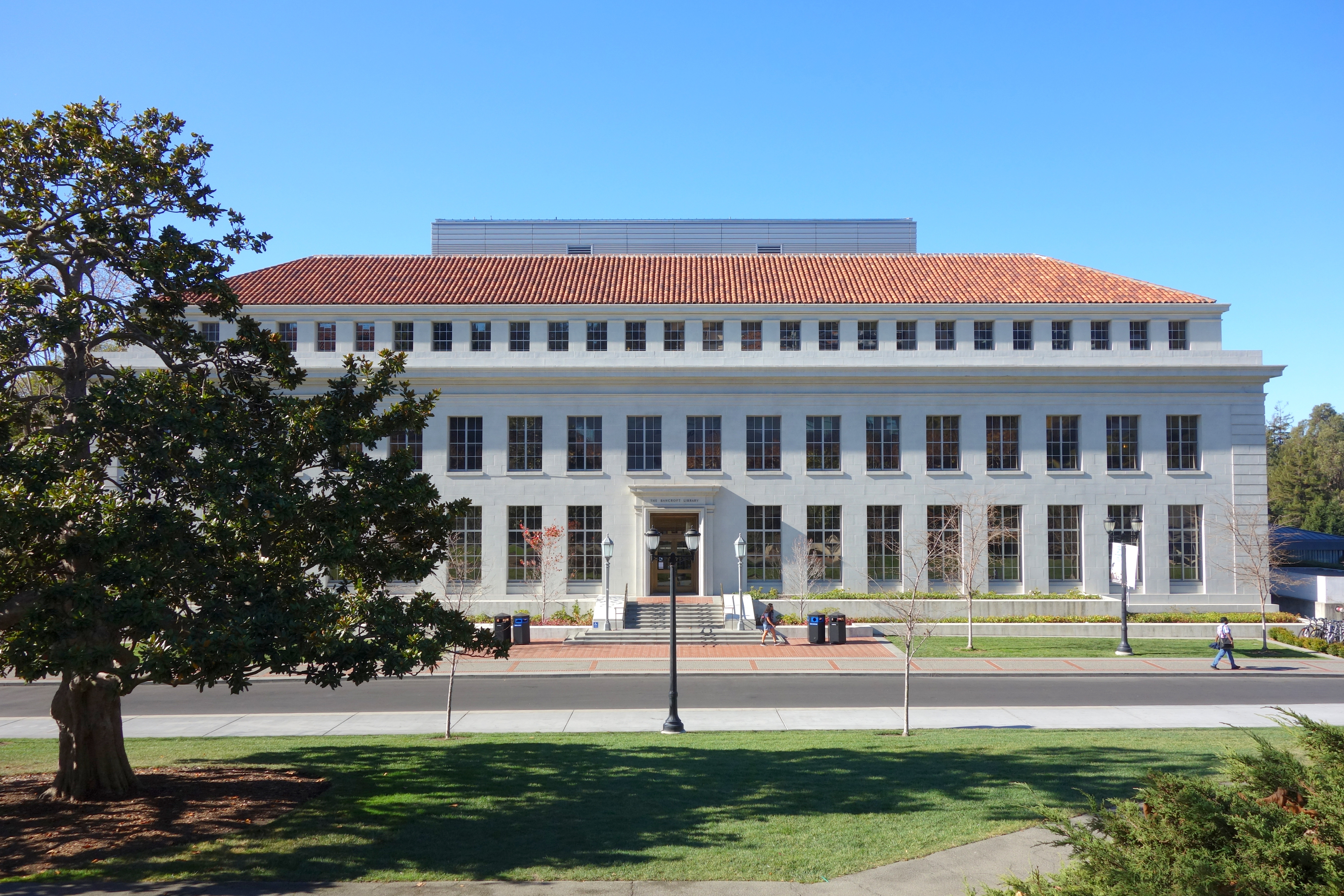
Bancroft Library – University of California, Berkeley

In the late 19th century, it was determined that much of the work of which Bancroft claimed authorship had in fact been written by others. This tainted his legacy in the eyes of some scholars, on the principle "false in one thing, false in all." The Salt Lake Tribune called him a "purloiner of other peoples' brains" in 1893.

The Bancroft Library at UC Berkeley, reflects the collector's name. The University of California purchased his 60,000-volume book collection in 1905.

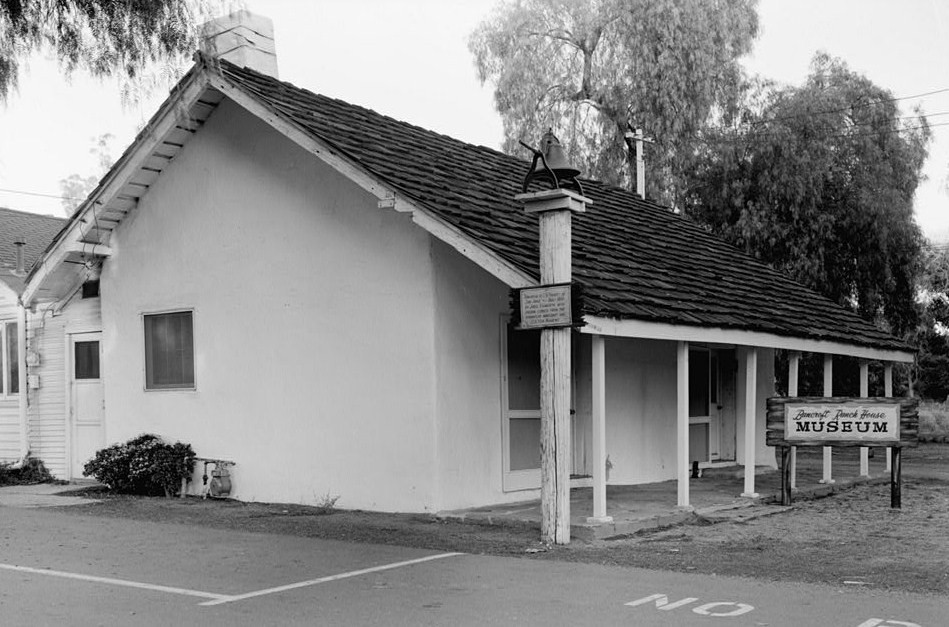
Bancroft House, Spring Valley CA

In 1885 Bancroft purchased a ranch with an adobe cottage located in Spring Valley, in San Diego County, as a retirement home. The Hubert H. Bancroft Ranch House is now a National Historic Landmark. In addition, part of a property Bancroft bought around 1880 in Contra Costa County, California, later became the Ruth Bancroft Garden, when three acres of the remaining farm land was given by Bancroft's grandson Philip to his wife, Ruth Bancroft.

Several schools are named for Bancroft, including Bancroft Middle School (Long Beach, California), Bancroft Middle School (Los Angeles, California), Hubert H. Bancroft Elementary School in Sacramento, California, Bancroft Middle School in San Leandro, California, Bancroft Elementary School in Walnut Creek, California, and Bancroft Community School in Spring Valley, California.

Contrary to some sources, including Bancroft's own obituary, Bancroft Way in Berkeley, California is not named for Hubert Howe Bancroft, but rather for historian and statesman George Bancroft.

An archive of Bancroft family correspondence, collected by his daughter Kate, is held in Special Collections and Archives at Geisel Library at the University of California, San Diego.

Recollections of Hubert Howe Bancroft and the Bancroft Family, an oral history interview with Margaret Wood Bancroft, widow of Bancroft's son Griffing, is held in the Oral History Center of the Bancroft Library at the University of California, Berkeley.

== Published works ==
Bancroft's written works include the following, with the 39-volume set of The Works of Hubert Howe Bancroft (pub. 1874–1890):

- The Native Races: Wild tribes. Vol. I. D. Appleton & Company. 1875.
- The Native Races: Civilized nations. Vol. II. D. Appleton. 1875.
- The Native Races: Myths and languages. Vol. III. Appleton. 1875.
- The Native Races: Antiquities. Vol. IV. D. Appleton. 1875. (Remains and Ruins)
- The Native Races: Primitive History. Vol. V. D. Appleton. 1876.
- History of Central America. 1501–1530. Vol. VI. History Company. 1888.
- History of Central America. 1530–1800. Vol. VII. Bancroft & Co. 1883.
- History of Central America: 1801–1887. Vol. VIII. Bancroft & Co. 1887.
- History of Mexico: 1516–1521 . Vol. IX. Bancroft & Co. 1882.
- History of Mexico: 1521–1600 . Vol. X. Bancroft & Co. 1883.
- History of Mexico: 1600–1803 . Vol. XI. Bancroft & Co. 1883.
- History of Mexico: 1804–1824 . Vol. XII. Bancroft & Co. 1885.
- History of Mexico: 1824–1861 . Vol. XIII. Bancroft & Co. 1885.
- History of Mexico: 1861–1887 . Vol. XIV. Bancroft & Co. 1888.
- History of the North Mexican States and Texas: 1531–1800. Vol. XV. Bancroft & Co. 1884.
- History of the North Mexican States and Texas: 1801–1889. Vol. XVI. History Co. 1889.
- History of Arizona and New Mexico: 1530–1888. Vol. XVII. History Co. 1889.
- History of California: 1542–1800. Vol. XVIII. History Co. 1884.
- History of California: 1801–1824. Vol. XIX. History Co. 1885.
- History of California: 1825–1840. Vol. XX. Bancroft & Co. 1886.
- History of California: 1840–1845. Vol. XXI. History Co. 1886.
- History of California: 1846–1848. Vol. XXII. History Co. 1886.
- History of California: 1848–1859. Vol. XXIII. History Co. 1888. (the Gold Rush years)
- History of California: 1860–1890. Vol. XXIV. History Co. 1890.
- History of Nevada, Colorado, and Wyoming: 1540–1888. Vol. XXV. History Co. 1890.
- History of Utah: 1540–1886. Vol. XXVI. History Co. 1889.
- History of the Northwest Coast: 1543–1800. Vol. XXVII. Bancroft & Co. 1884.
- History of the Northwest Coast: 1800–1846. Vol. XXVIII. History Co. 1890.
- History of Oregon. 1834–1848. Vol. XXIX. History Co. 1886.
- History of Oregon: 1848–1888. Vol. XXX. History Co. 1888.
- History of Washington, Idaho, and Montana: 1845–1889. Vol. XXXI. History Co. 1890.
- History of British Columbia: 1792–1887. Vol. XXXII. History Co. 1887.
- History of Alaska: 1730–1885. Vol. XXXIII. History Co. 1886.
- California Pastoral: 1769–1848. Vol. XXXIV. Bancroft & Co. 1888.
- California Inter Pocula. Vol. XXXV. History Co. 1888.
- Popular Tribunals. Vol. XXXVI. History Co. 1887.
- Popular Tribunals. Vol. XXXVII. History Co. 1887.
- Essays and Miscellany. Vol. XXXVIII. History Co. 1890.
- Literary Industries. Vol. XXXIX. History Co. 1891. This volume gives an account of his methods of work.
- The Early American Chroniclers (1883)
- Chronicles of the Builders of the Commonwealth: Historical Character Study (1891–1892)
- Book of the Fair (1893)
- Resources and Development of Mexico (1893)
- The Book of Wealth (1896)
- The New Pacific (Revised ed.). New York: The Bancroft Company. 1913. OCLC 19919362.
- Retrospection, Political and Personal (1912, 1915)
- Why a World Centre of Industry at San Francisco Bay (1916)
- In These Latter Days (1917)

=== Note on production methods ===
Bancroft made use of index cards in the organization and compilation of facts for his lengthy and massive series of historical volumes. In the course of his organization of source material and writing, Bancroft made use of scores of research assistants, the contributions of some of whom amounted to the output of co-writers.

Originally he seems to have intended to use topical sections of writing produced by his assistants as the basis of a broad narrative which he himself would write, but as the work progressed he came to use the statements as they were, with only slight changes. He said his assistants were capable investigators, and there is evidence that some of them deserved his confidence; Frances Fuller Victor, in particular, was a well-known author. However, his failure to acknowledge each contribution created doubt about the quality of the work. Overall, although Bancroft considered himself the author of his works, in contemporary terms it is more accurate to consider him an editor and compiler.

Neither Bancroft, nor most of his assistants, had enough training to avoid stating their personal opinions and enthusiasms, but their works were generally well received in their time. Historian Francis Parkman praised Bancroft's The Native Races in The North American Review. Lewis Henry Morgan's essay, "Montezuma's Dinner," rebuts Lewis Henry Morgan's ideas about gradations of civilization. In turn, Morgan's essay was based on Friedrich Engels' "The Origin of the Family, Private Property and the State: in the Light of the Researches of Lewis H. Morgan." Bancroft critiqued Morgan's understanding of stages of civilization and savagery. Both Morgan's and Engels' ideas are most certainly antiquated and reveal a profound and mechanistic understanding of human development.
