= Bud Moore (NASCAR owner) =

American stock car racing team owner

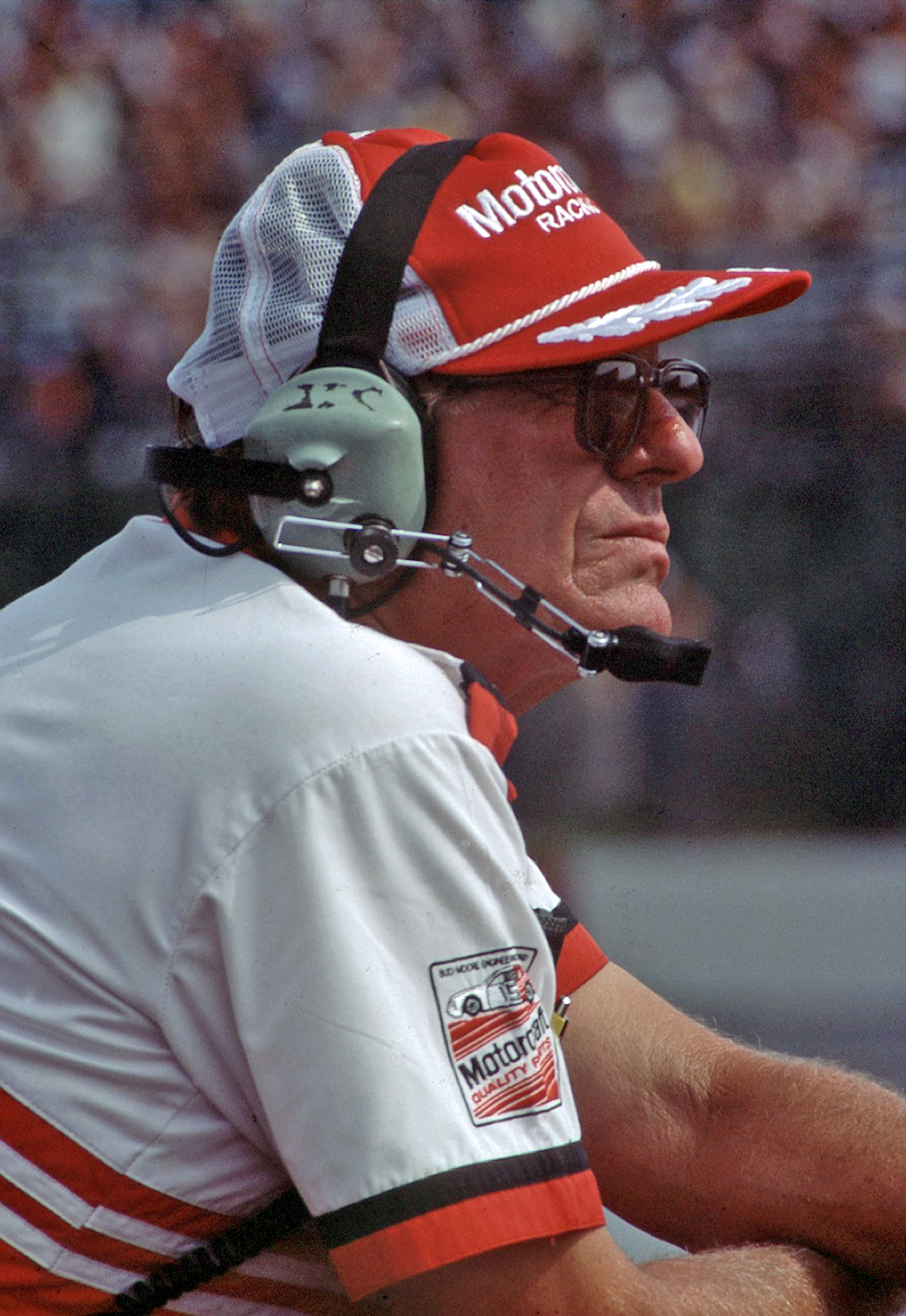
- Moore in 1985
- Born: Walter Maynard Moore Jr. May 25, 1925; Spartanburg, South Carolina, U.S.
- Died: November 27, 2017 (aged 92); Spartanburg, South Carolina, U.S.
- Spouse: Betty Moore
- Children: 3
- Military career
- Allegiance: United States
- Branch: Army
- Service years: 1943–1945
- Rank: Sergeant
- Units: 359th Infantry Regiment, 90th Infantry Division
- Conflicts: World War II Battle of Normandy Battle of the Bulge Siege of Bastogne
- Awards: Military: Purple Heart (5); Bronze Star (2); NASCAR: Stock Car Racing Hall of Fame (2002); International Motorsports Hall of Fame (2009); NASCAR Hall of Fame (2011)
- Other work: NASCAR crew chief (1950–1989); NASCAR team owner (1961–2000)
- Website: www.budmoore.us

Walter Maynard "Bud" Moore Jr. (May 25, 1925 – November 27, 2017) was a NASCAR car owner who operated the Bud Moore Engineering team. A decorated veteran of World War II, he described himself as "an old country mechanic who loved to make 'em run fast".

Moore served in World War II as a member of the United States Army. A machine gunner, he participated in the Normandy landings as part of the 4th Infantry Division, landing on Utah Beach. After Normandy, he went on to fight in the Battle of the Bulge and ended his military service as a sergeant.

When he returned from the war, he began a career in stock car racing as a crew chief. In the 1960s, he opened Bud Moore Engineering, a team that went on to win two NASCAR Grand National Series championships and 63 races for 37 years until its shutdown in 1999. He was inducted into the NASCAR Hall of Fame in 2011.

== Early and personal life ==
Moore was born on May 25, 1925, on a farm in Spartanburg, South Carolina, to Walter M. "Dick" Moore Sr.; he was one of ten children, including six brothers and three sisters. After attending Jenkins and Cleveland Junior High, he started going to Spartanburg High School. After receiving his driver's license at the age of 14, he and friends Joe Eubanks and Cotton Owens raced their cars in the streets.

He met his wife, Betty Clark, while in high school. The two dated until Moore departed for the military and got engaged prior to his service. When Moore returned, they married and had three sons, Greg, Daryl, and Brent. They also have five grandchildren. Greg and Daryl were also involved in NASCAR, serving as team consultants for Fenley-Moore Motorsports alongside their father; Daryl served as Chief Engine Builder; Greg had also worked as Bud Moore Engineering's team manager. When his NASCAR career ended, Moore returned to South Carolina and became a farmer, raising Santa Gertrudis cattle with Greg and Daryl.

There is also a South Carolina-born NASCAR driver named Bud Moore who raced in the 1960s and 1970s. Nicknamed "Little Bud", the driver has no relation to the owner.

Moore died on November 27, 2017, in Spartanburg at the age of 92.

== Military career ==
On June 2, 1943, a day after graduating high school and a week after his 18th birthday, Moore was drafted into the United States military. Although he expressed interest in joining the Navy as Eubanks, Owens, and Moore's brother Charles were also in the branch, he did not have a college education (which was required for those entering the Navy) and a naval officer attempted to place him in the Marine Corps. Unhappy with this, Moore instead joined the Army. After training at Camp Van Dorn in Mississippi, he went to New Jersey's Fort Dix, where he was assigned to the 90th Infantry Division, D Company, 359th Infantry Regiment, 1st Battalion, 1st Platoon as a machine gunner. As a member of the 1st Platoon, Moore's machine gun was .30 caliber water-cooled, described as a heavy weapon.

Moore and his group were not expecting to participate in the Normandy landings in 1944. In March, they were told they would be involved in an amphibious assault off the English coast, with plans of a dry run upon completing training in Knighton, Powys. The group landed in Liverpool before going to an army camp in Wales, South Yorkshire. On June 4, two days before the landings, Moore observed a map produced by officers and realized the land depicted was not England, but France, and that he would be involved in the invasion of Normandy. The regiment was reattached to the 4th Infantry Division for the operation.

On June 6, Moore's division landed on Utah Beach, where they faced German resistance and other obstacles; at one point, as he waded through the water, Moore stepped in a shell hole and fell in, causing him to go underwater before recovering. Upon reaching land, he hid behind a sand dune before continuing. By nightfall, the division had reached half a mile inland and started settling into foxholes when the 82nd and 101st Airborne Divisions arrived to divert German attention. There was also discussion among Moore's division about General Dwight D. Eisenhower recalling them due to the lack of progress made at nearby Omaha Beach, though they stayed at Utah. After clearing the beach, Moore joined General George S. Patton at Périers, Manche. At the city, Moore witnessed American airplanes dropping bombs along a ten-mile strip near the city, an event nicknamed "The Big Push". While he was near Paris, Moore's group was assigned to capture the Cotentin Peninsula before returning to Patton. Instead of Moore's group, General Philippe Leclerc de Hauteclocque's men liberated Paris.

After leaving France, Moore's group crossed the Siegfried Line and reached the Rhine before being withdrawn to Verdun, where they stayed for three weeks without supplies. As it turned out, the Germans had built their infantry along the Siegfried Line and had launched the Battle of the Bulge, which forced Moore's division to fight their way back to the line and losing approximately 12,000 men in the process. On one mission during the battle, Moore and a German-speaking Jeep driver entered a German-occupied town that also served as a Wehrmacht area regimental headquarters. The two began to inspect houses and spotted a German soldier running into a wooden hut. Moore attacked the hut, causing it to catch fire and prompting the soldier to surrender; he was tied onto the hood of the Jeep. As they continued through the town, they noticed more Germans hiding in a rock house, which Moore also fired upon. Although the Germans displayed a white flag of surrender, they did not exit the building. Moore's driver ordered the captured soldier to convince his comrades to surrender before Moore summoned artillery. When they left the house, Moore discovered 15 soldiers and four officers among the surrendering German troops. He was awarded the Bronze Star Medal for his work in the operation.

As he continued through Germany into Czechoslovakia, Moore was promoted to sergeant, during which he earned a second Bronze Star after his involvement in a battle located in an abandoned hospital. He also received five Purple Hearts, four for shrapnel damage and one for taking machine gun fire to the hip. In spite of his injuries, he was often sent back into battle after brief stays in the hospital; by February 1945, he and a lieutenant were the only men in the group to have fought in Normandy. At one point, Moore and the lieutenant were to receive a 90-day furlough and return to the United States in March, but Moore was injured and his reprieve papers were lost, forcing him to remain in Europe.

In December 1944, Moore participated in the Siege of Bastogne, providing support for the besieged 101st Airborne Division. Two months later, Moore's division was replaced by the 5th, though he stayed at the Rhine. Germany surrendered in May, ending the war in Europe. At the time, Moore was in Plzeň, Czechoslovakia, learning of the German defeat from Red Army soldiers. Despite the victory in Europe, Moore wondered about the possibility of fighting in the Pacific War against Japan, though the atomic bombings of Hiroshima and Nagasaki in August ended speculation of such combat. To return troops home, the government instituted a points system in which the most decorated troops leaving first. With his medals and service time of nine months and fourteen days without a break, he was among the first to return to the United States, doing so aboard the USS Excelsior; the ship was named after the Excelsior Mills in Union, South Carolina, near Moore's hometown of Spartanburg. He was formally discharged on November 15, 1945.

Despite his honors, Moore distanced himself from his allies. He received the information of his company members but did not contact them out of worry that doing so would lead to him finding out they were killed in action. He also turned down offers to return to the beaches of Europe, saying he "left too many friends over there." In 1994, the 50th anniversary of the Normandy landings, Moore was invited by Unocal Corporation to follow his route during the war from Utah Beach to Czechoslovakia. He declined the offer, stating he "would have gone, but when racing is your livelihood and there's a race on the schedule for a certain weekend, you about have to be there."

== NASCAR ==
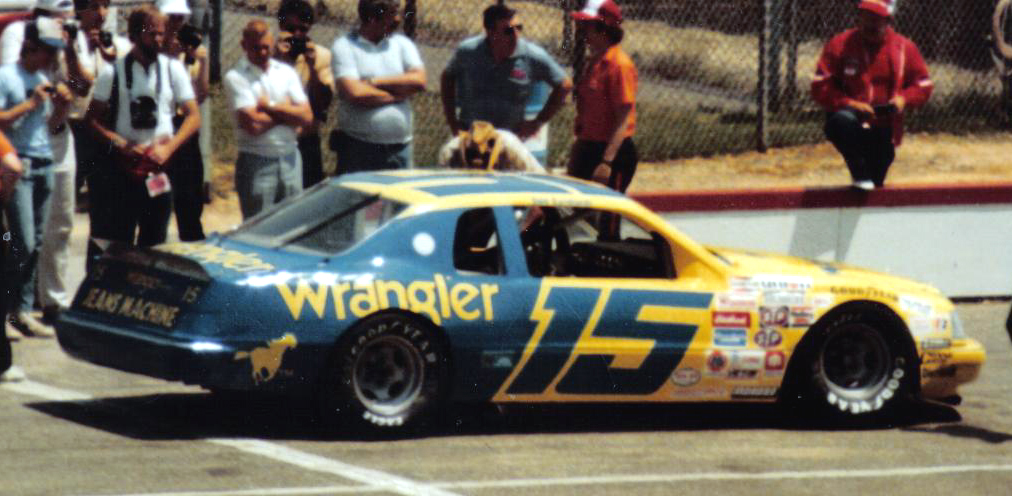
The Bud Moore Engineering No. 15 car in 1983, driven by Dale Earnhardt. In two seasons with Moore (1982 and 1983), Earnhardt won three races.

Upon returning to the States, Moore reunited with Eubanks and opened a used car business, working on cars used in moonshine running. The two traded a 1939 Ford for a race car and started competing in motorsports. After racing in smaller series, the two moved into NASCAR in 1950, debuting in the inaugural Southern 500 at Darlington Raceway; Eubanks drove the No. 4 car to a 19th-place finish with Moore serving as his crew chief. In 1956 and 1957, driver Buck Baker won the Grand National Series championships with Moore as crew chief. During his career as a crew chief, Moore won 49 races. His last race as a crew chief was the 1989 Atlanta Journal 500 at Atlanta International Raceway, working with Brett Bodine as he finished 23rd.

During the 1960s, Moore opened his own NASCAR team, Bud Moore Engineering, operating in Spartanburg. In 1961, the team fielded cars for Owens, Fireball Roberts, Tommy Irwin, and Joe Weatherly. In Moore's first race as an owner, Weatherly won the Daytona 500 Qualifying Race and followed it with a second-place finish at the Daytona 500. Weatherly would win eight of his 24 races driving Moore's Pontiacs. Weatherly also ended up winning the 1962 and 1963 NASCAR Grand National championships, again driving for Moore, with 12 combined wins. After the 1963 season, Moore switched from Pontiac to Ford Motor Company's Mercury division. That year, Billy Wade managed to win five poles and four Grand National races in a row driving for Moore. Buddy Baker won three straight Talladega Superspeedway races in 1975 and 1976, and in 1978, Bobby Allison won the Daytona 500 driving for Moore.

Moore also worked with fellow Ford team Wood Brothers Racing, teaching team owners Leonard and Eddie Wood the use of the slide rule to determine a car's horsepower on a dynamometer. In a 2015 online chat with fans, Moore considered the Woods to be his closest colleagues among NASCAR owners.

In 1965, Moore and Lincoln Mercury Performance supervisor Fran Hernandez partnered to build drag cars. Two years later, Moore and Hernandez joined Dan Gurney in fielding Mercury Cougars in the Sports Car Club of America's Trans-Am Series. That year, the Bud Moore Cougar Team, with Parnelli Jones, Dan Gurney and Peter Revson driving, winning four races and just missing the series title by just two points, before Mercury left the series at the end of the season. In 1968, Tiny Lund won the newly-formed Grand American division championship driving a Cougar for Moore; over 1970 and 1971, Lund won 41 of the series' 109 races. Moore returned to the Trans-Am in 1969, with Parnelli Jones and George Follmer driving a pair of Boss 302 Mustangs, combining to take 3 wins. In 1970 Jones and Follmer were back in Moore's Boss 302 Mustangs, with Jones dominating the series, handily winning the Trans-Am championship on the strength of his 5 wins. Adding Follmer's win at Loudon, NH would give the Moore Team an even 6 wins for the season.

Other notable racers have driven for Moore, including Darel Dieringer, David Pearson, Cale Yarborough, Bobby Isaac, Dale Earnhardt, Darrell Waltrip, Donnie Allison, Geoff Bodine, Ricky Rudd, Brett Bodine, and Morgan Shepherd. During his 37 years as a car owner, Moore recorded 63 wins, 43 poles and two NASCAR Grand National championships. By the time of his team's shutdown in 1999, the 63 wins made Moore the fourth owner with the most wins in NASCAR history.

In the late 1990s, a lack of funding hindered the team's progress. After losing its primary sponsor during the 1996 season, the team attempted only five of 84 races, qualifying for two. BME received sponsorship requests from various groups, including a three-year contract with American Veterans, but the deals failed to materialize. With few options remaining, Moore sold the team's assets and Spartanburg shop to Winston West Series operation Fenley Motorsports, for whom he became a consultant as the team changed its name to Fenley-Moore Motorsports and retained Moore's No. 15. Derrike Cope signed with the team for the final two races of the year in preparation to run the full 2000 season, but the struggle to find sponsorship prompted Moore to leave his consultant role in February 2000. The team was unable to pay Cope, who sued Fenley for breach of contract. Moore's last race as an owner was the 2000 DieHard 500 at Talladega with Ted Musgrave; he finished 35th after being involved in a crash on lap 137. Fenley sold the team shop and planned to move operations near Interstate 85. The shop was sold to Ernie Elliott Inc. via public auction on April 1, 2002. Converse College currently owns the shop.

Although he no longer owned a team, Moore remained in the sport, working on NASCAR's appeals committee. In 2002, he was inducted into the Stock Car Racing Hall of Fame; seven years later, he was enshrined in the International Motorsports Hall of Fame. On May 23, 2011, he was named to the second class of the NASCAR Hall of Fame. During his induction speech, Moore stated he would like to be remembered as "one who made many contributions to the sport. One who's [sic] firm handshake was as good as any contract. One who always gave a straight answer. Most of all, to be remembered as a man who loved his family, his country and the sport of racing."

He was inducted into the Motorsports Hall of Fame of America in 2013.
