= 359th Infantry Regiment =

Unit of the United States Army

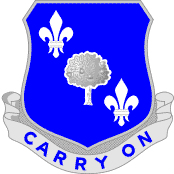
- Distinctive Unit Insignia of the 359th Infantry Regiment
- Active: 1917–1918; 1921-1945; 1947-present
- Country: United States
- Branch: United States Army: National Army (1917–1918); Organized Reserves (1921-1942); Army of the United States (1942–1945); United States Army Reserve (1947–present)
- Type: Infantry
- Motto: Carry On
- Engagements: World War I World War II; Global war on terrorism

Commanders
- Notable commanders: Raymond E. Bell

The 359th Infantry Regiment is a unit of the United States Army. It was active in Europe as part of the 90th Infantry Division during World War I and World War II, and components of the regiment were later part of the United States Army Reserve.

== History ==
=== World War I ===
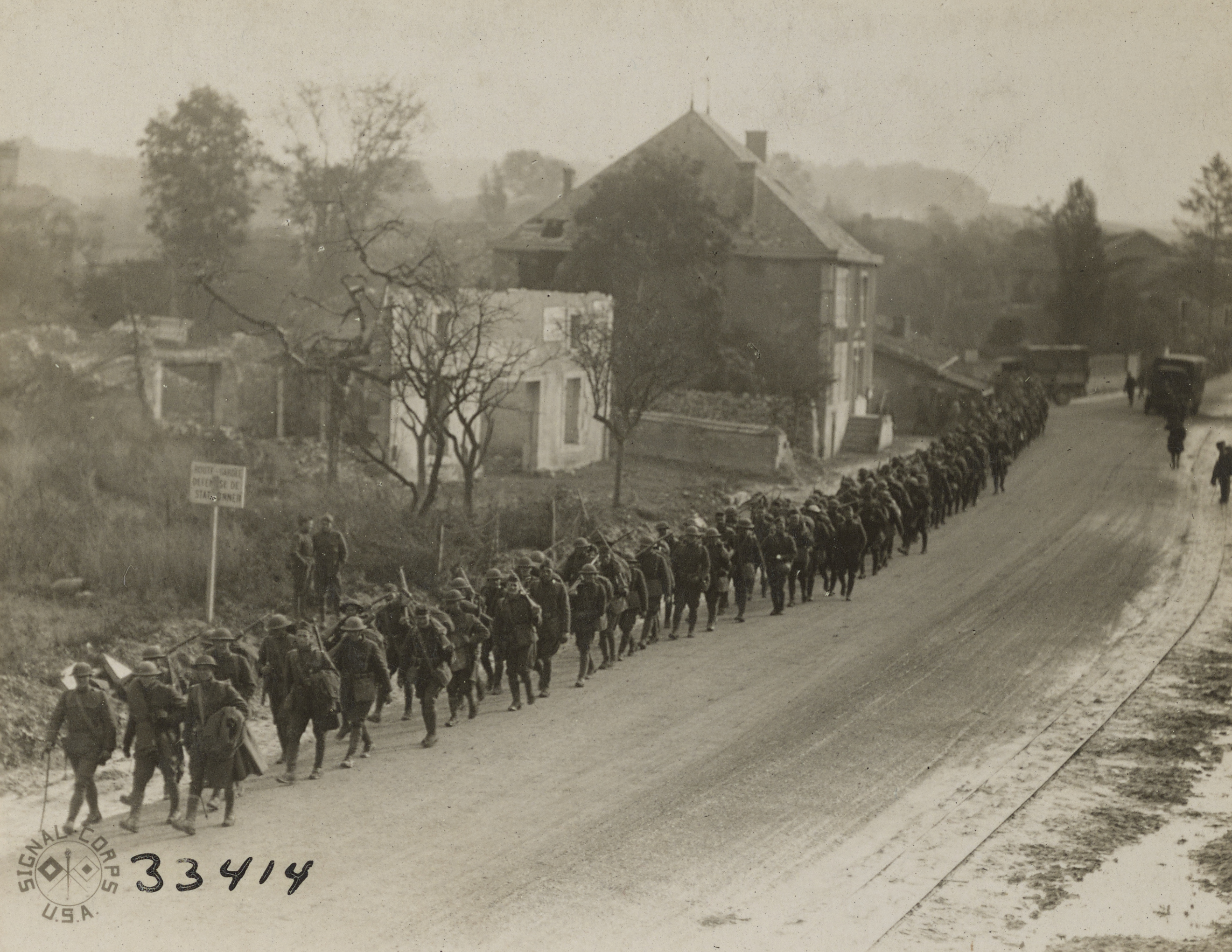
Doughboys of Company M, 359th Infantry, 90th Division, going in on the Argonne sector, Dombasle-en-Argonne, Meuse, France, October 22, 1918.

The 359th Infantry Regiment was constituted for World War I at Camp Travis, Texas (Note: Camp Travis was five miles northeast of downtown San Antonio and adjacent to the northeastern boundary of Fort Sam Houston. It was absorbed by Fort Sam Houston in 1922.) on August 5, 1917 as a unit of the National Army. It was organized in September and assigned to the 180th Infantry Brigade, a unit of the 90th Division. After completing individual and collective training, the regiment served in France during the war, including duty in the Villers-en-Haye, Battle of Saint-Mihiel, duty in the Puvenelle Sector of Lorraine, and the Meuse–Argonne offensive. The regiment remained in Europe for post-war occupation duty following the Armistice of November 11, 1918 and was demobilized at Camp Bowie, Texas on June 24, 1919.

=== Post-World War I ===
On June 24, 1921, the regiment was reconstituted in the Organized Reserve with headquarters in Dallas and assigned to the 90th Infantry Division. The regiment was initiated in November 1921 with regimental headquarters at Dallas, Texas. Subordinate battalion headquarters were concurrently organized as follows: 1st Battalion at Dallas; 2nd Battalion at Marshall, Texas; and 3rd Battalion at Greenville, Texas. The regimental band was organized in 1923 at Dallas. The regiment typically conducted inactive training period meetings at the Liggett Building, the Federal Building, or the US Terminal Annex building in Dallas. Conducted summer training with the 9th and 23rd Infantry Regiments at Fort Sam Houston or Camp Bullis, Texas. Conducted infantry Citizens Military Training Camps at Fort Sam Houston or Camp Bullis as an alternate form of summer training. Conducted annual contact camps at the Greenville Lake Country Club during the fall or winter months. The primary ROTC feeder school for new Reserve lieutenants for the regiment was the North Texas Agricultural College.

On March 25, 1942, the 359th was called to active service for participation in World War II and was organized and trained at Camp Barkeley, Texas.

=== World War II ===
During World War II, the 359th Infantry served in Europe as part of the 90th Infantry Division. It took part in several campaigns, including Normandy, Northern France, Rhineland, Ardennes Alsace, and Central Europe. The 359th Infantry Regiment returned to the United States at the end of the war and was inactivated at Camp Kilmer, New Jersey on December 26, 1945.

=== Post-World War II ===
The 359th Infantry was reactivated on March 24, 1947 as a unit of the Organized Reserve Corps (ORC). Its headquarters was again located in Dallas. In 1952, the ORC was redesignated the United States Army Reserve. On April 1, 1959, the regiment was reorganized as a parent regiment under the Combat Arms Regimental System to consist of 1st Battle Group, a subordinate unit of the 90th Infantry Division.

A reorganization on March 15, 1963 resulted in the 359th Infantry consisting of two battalions, the 1st and 2nd, which remained part of the 90th Infantry Division. 1st and 2d Battalions were inactivated on December 31, 1965 and relieved from assignment to the 90th Infantry Division.

On October 17, 1999, the regiment was reorganized as 1st Battalion, 359th Regiment. 1st Battalion was then allocated to the Army Reserve's 91st Division (Training Support).

=== Global war on terrorism ===
1st Battalion, 359th Regiment was subsequently reallocated from the Army Reserve to the Regular Army. In 2014, the battalion was commended for its contributions to the global war on terrorism between June 2004 and January 2005.

== Distinctive unit insignia ==
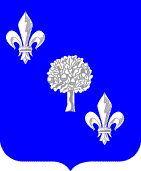
Coat of Arms of the 359th Infantry Regiment

The 359th Infantry Regiment's distinctive unit insignia (DUI) depicts an oak tree between two fleur-de-lis on a blue field. Blue signifies the Infantry branch. The oak tree signifies the Forest of Argonne and the regiment's participation in the Meuse–Argonne offensive. The fleur-de-lis represent the regiment's participation in the Battle of Saint-Mihiel and battles that took place in Lorraine. The DUI also incorporates the regiment's motto, "Carry On". The regiment's coat of arms incorporates the oak tree and fleur-de-lis.

== Campaign participation credit ==
The 359th Infantry Regiment's campaign participation credit includes:

=== World War I ===
- St. Mihiel
- Meuse-Argonne
- Lorraine 1918

=== World War II ===
- Normandy (with arrowhead)
- Northern France
- Rhineland
- Ardennes Alsace
- Central Europe

== Decorations ==
Decorations to which the 359th Infantry Regiment is entitled include:

=== World War II ===
- French Croix de Guerre with Palm for MOSELLE-SARRE RIVERS
- Presidential Unit Citation (Army) for PRETOT, FRANCE (1st Battalion)
- Presidential Unit Citation (Army) for NORTHERN FRANCE (1st Battalion)
- Meritorious Unit Commendation (Army) (regimental headquarters, headquarters companies of 1st, 2nd, and 3rd Battalions, Service Company, Medical Detachment)

=== Global war on terrorism ===
Army Superior Unit Award (1st Battalion)

== Notable members ==
- John D. Hawk, World War II recipient of the Medal of Honor
- Forrest E. Everhart, World War II recipient of the Medal of Honor
- Bud Moore, World War II machine gunner in Company D, NASCAR car owner who operated Bud Moore Engineering.
- Samuel Tankersley Williams, commanded Company I, 3rd Battalion during World War I. Subsequently attained the rank of lieutenant general as commander of Military Assistance and Advisory Group, Vietnam.
