= John Palmer (cricketer) =

English cricketer

Personal information
- Full name: John Palmer
- Born: 29 March 1881; Ibstock, Leicestershire, England
- Died: 14 June 1928 (aged 47); Ibstock, Leicestershire, England
- Batting: Right-handed
- Bowling: Right-arm medium
- Relatives: George Palmer (son)

Domestic team information
- Years: Team
- 1906: Leicestershire

Career statistics
| Competition | First-class |
|---|---|
| Matches | 3 |
| Runs scored | 27 |
| Batting average | 5.40 |
| 100s/50s | –/– |
| Top score | 13 |
| Balls bowled | 465 |
| Wickets | 8 |
| Bowling average | 26.12 |
| 5 wickets in innings | – |
| 10 wickets in match | – |
| Best bowling | 3/14 |
| Catches/stumpings | 2/– |
- Source: Cricinfo, 13 February 2013

John Palmer (29 March 1881 – 14 June 1928) was an English cricketer. Palmer was a right-handed batsman who bowled right-arm medium pace. He was born at Ibstock, Leicestershire.

Palmer made his first-class debut for Leicestershire against Essex in the 1906 County Championship at Aylestone Road, Leicester. He made two addition first-class appearances in that season's County Championship, playing against Kent and Northamptonshire. In his three matches, he took 8 wickets at an average of 26.12, with best figures of 3/14. With the bat he scored 27 runs at an average of 5.40, with a high score of 13.

He died in his birth village on 14 June 1928. His son, George, also played first-class cricket.
