= Hubert H. Bancroft Ranch House =

- Hubert H. Bancroft Ranchhouse
- U.S. National Register of Historic Places
- U.S. National Historic Landmark
- California Historical Landmark
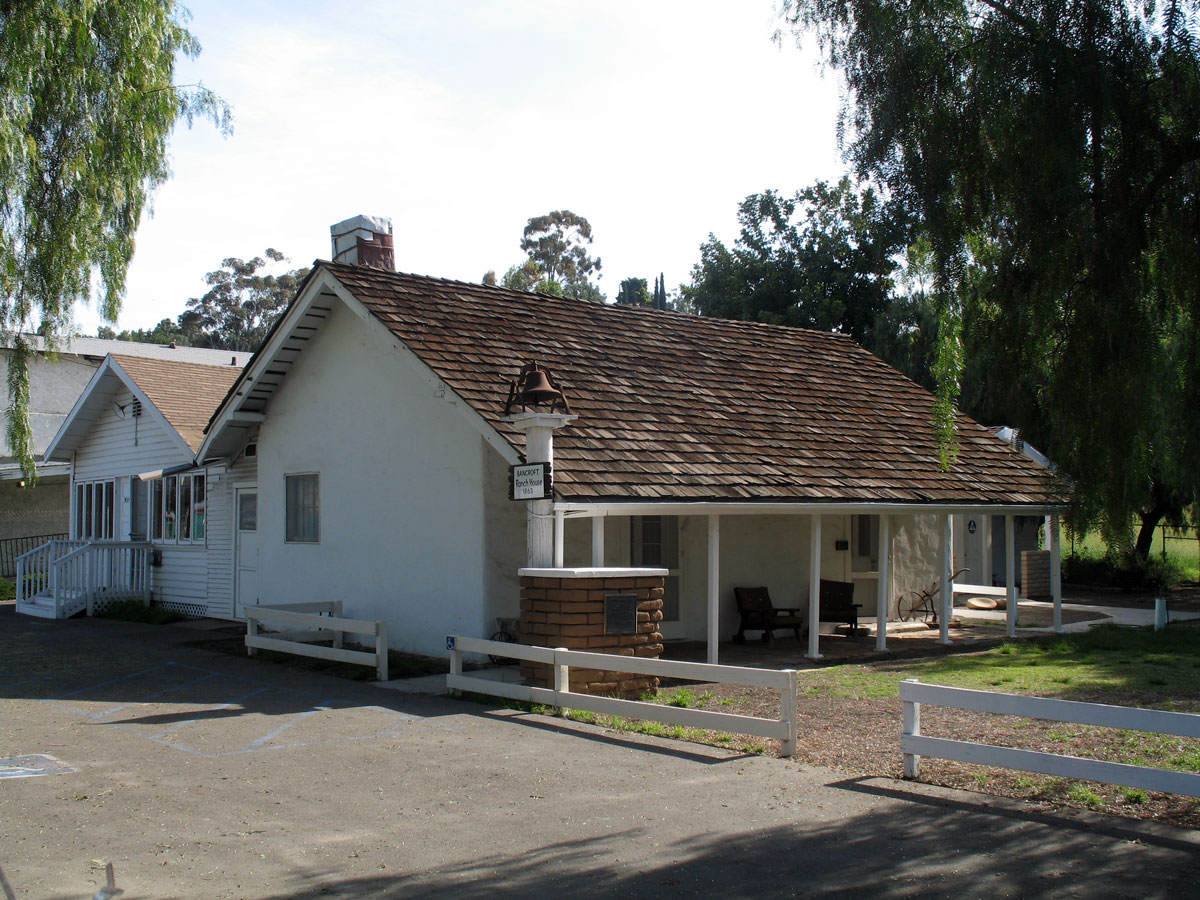
- The house in 2007

- Location within California Location within the United States
- Location: 9050 Memory Lane, Spring Valley, California
- Coordinates: 32°44′44″N 117°0′7″W
- Area: 1 acre (0.40 ha)
- Built: 1856
- NRHP reference No.: 66000227
- CHISL No.: 626

Significant dates
- Added to NRHP: October 15, 1966
- Designated NHL: December 29, 1962
- Designated CHISL: 1958

The Hubert H. Bancroft Ranch House is a historic house museum at 9050 Memory Lane in Spring Valley, California. Built in 1856, it is the oldest Anglo-American building in the town. From 1885 until his death in 1918, it was home to Hubert Howe Bancroft, a pioneering historian of the western United States, Mexico, and Central America. Now managed by the local historical society as a museum, it was designated a National Historic Landmark in 1962 for its association with Bancroft, and was registered as a California Historical Landmark in 1958.

== Description and history ==
The Bancroft Ranch House is located in western Spring Valley, just northwest of Bancroft County Park. It is accessed via Memory Lane, a short lane off Bancroft Drive. The house is a single-story adobe structure, to which a frame addition has been made. Each of these sections is covered by a gabled roof with wooden shingles. The roof of the adobe section extends over an open veranda area, where it is supported by square posts. The oldest portion of the adobe has embedded in it curved timbers, which were salvaged from the Clarissa Andrews, a coal freighter and packet ship wrecked in San Diego Bay. The property also contains a natural spring, named El aguaje de San Jorge (St. George's Spring) by the Spanish, after which the community of Spring Valley is named.

The house was built in 1856 by Augustus Ensworth. Upon Enworth's death, the property was sold in 1865 to Rufus King Porter, son of the founder of Scientific American. Porter added a kitchen, a dining room, and two bedrooms. He later sold the property to historian Hubert Howe Bancroft in 1885. Bancroft expanded the property, eventually owning more than 500 acres (200 ha), which he operated as a gentleman's farm. After Bancroft's death in 1918, his heirs divided the estate. The portion including the house was acquired in 1940 by the Spring Valley Chamber of Commerce. The house was rehabilitated in 1962, and was opened as a museum the following year. Now located in the adjacent park is a rock structure which Bancroft built in the 1880s as a schoolhouse and fireproof storage house for his historical materials.

Bancroft is best known for a massive 39-volume history, published between 1882 and 1890. The history covers the entire area of western North America, from coastal Alaska to Mexico and Central America. The library Bancroft amassed in pursuit of his research contains more than 60,000 volumes, and is now located at the University of California, Berkeley.

== See also ==
- List of National Historic Landmarks in California
- National Register of Historic Places listings in San Diego County, California
