= George Palmer (colour theorist) =

English chemist

- Born: c. 1746; England
- Died: 3 March 1826 (aged 79–80); Copenhagen, Denmark
- Occupation: Chemist

George Palmer (c. 1746 – 3 March 1826), also known as George Giros de Gentilly, named Palmer) was an English dye chemist, colour theorist, inventor, and soldier. He is best known for his conjectures about colour vision and colour blindness.

== Life ==
According to statements in his Copenhagen obituary, Palmer was born on an English ship to English parents of Catholic faith. Owing to the 18th century restrictions on activities of English Catholics, Palmer, as many others of his time, lived a double life between England and France. Nothing is known about his early years. Palmer reports to have witnessed the destructive fire at the Hôtel-Dieu de Paris in 1772, at approximate age 26.

Circa 1775, he introduced a solution of tin as a new mordant for the dyeing of wool fabrics in Louviers, France, using the last name Giros de Gentilly. In 1777, located in London, he published Theory of Colours and Vision, a French edition of which, translated by Denis-Bernard Quatremere d'Isjonval, was published in the same year in Paris. The translator was active at the time as director in the textile manufacturing facility Disjonval in Sedan, France, co-owned by his family. In the same year Palmer also invented a fawn-coloured dye in London. In 1781 J. H Voigt of Gotha, Germany, editor of Magazin fuer das Neueste aus der Physik und Naturgeschichte, a scientific review journal, describes meeting with Giros von Gentilly and the latter's conjectures about colour blindness. In 1785 Palmer, living in Paris, had Lettre sur les moyens de produire, la nuit, une lumiere pareille a celle du jour published. In it he described the modification of oil lamp light with a blue glass mantel, resulting in the approximation of daylight. He became acquainted with Antoine-Arnoult Quinquet (1745–1803) and his partner Ambroise Bonaventure Lange, producers of a dual-air current (Argand-style) oil lamp and formed a partnership with the former. Introduction of the Quinquet-Lange lamp in Paris was the cause of Benjamin Franklin's famous letter on the subject of daylight saving time to the editor of Journal de Paris. In 1786 Palmer published Theorie de la lumiere, applicable aux arts, et principalement a la peinture. Toward the end of that decade Palmer became a mercenary soldier in the Corps of Engineers, at different times for Sweden, Austria, and Russia, reaching the rank of Major, as described in his obituary. In 1803 he published in Leipzig four short works on various inventions, one being a fire-extinguishing powder. A demonstration in a pharmacy of the use of the powder was described in a Niedersachsen newspaper. In 1811, Palmer moved to Copenhagen into retirement and died there destitute in 1826.

== Colour vision and colour blindness ==
Palmer made a lasting contribution to the development of colour science by being the first to speculate that there are three different mechanisms in the human eye that account for colour vision: "The superficies of the retina is compounded of particles of three different kinds, analogous to the three rays of light; and each of these particles is moved by its own ray." This statement has proved true in regard to the number of different light sensor types, the cones, in the human eye, if not in regard to the claim of three kinds of light. Twenty-five years later a similar statement was made by the eminent physicist Thomas Young.

Voigt, in his report on Giros von Gentilly, describes him as having stated that colour blindness arises if one or two of the three kinds of "particles" (light sensors) in the retina are inactive, a statement found to be accurate. In 1786 Palmer provided a hypothesis for the complementary nature of the successive contrast effect by stating that it is due to fatiguing of one or two of the light sensor types, an explanation that continues to be accepted as valid, as does his conjecture that the different kinds of sensors take different time intervals to recover upon exposure to strong light.
