= Forrest E. Everhart =

United States Army Medal of Honor recipient

Forrest E. Everhart Sr.
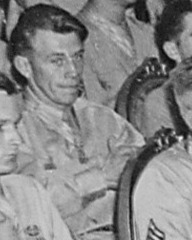
- Forrest Everhart after receiving his Medal of Honor from President Harry S. Truman on August 23, 1945
- Born: August 28, 1922; Bainbridge, Ohio, US
- Died: August 30, 1986 (aged 64)
- Burial place: Arlington National Cemetery
- Military career
- Allegiance: United States
- Branch: United States Army
- Service years: 1940–1945
- Rank: Technical Sergeant
- Units: 359th Infantry Regiment, 90th Infantry Division
- Conflicts: World War II
- Awards: Medal of Honor

Forrest Eugene Everhart Sr. (August 28, 1922 – August 30, 1986) was a United States Army soldier and a recipient of the United States military's highest decoration—the Medal of Honor—for his actions in World War II.

== Biography ==
Everhart joined the Army from Texas City, Texas in 1940, and by November 12, 1944, was serving as a technical sergeant in Company H, 359th Infantry Regiment, 90th Infantry Division. On that day, near Kerling, France, he led his platoon in a defense against a counterattack by a numerically superior German force. When German soldiers threatened to overrun his platoon's machine gun positions, he twice engaged them alone and drove them away. For these actions, he was awarded the Medal of Honor ten months later, on September 10, 1945.

Everhart was discharged from the Army after the war and reunited with his wife and son. When they returned to Ohio, a parade was held in his honor.

He spent the next 37 years working in his home state for the Department of Veterans Affairs. He and his wife went on to have five more children.

On Aug. 30, 1986, Everhart died of lung cancer at the age of 64 after a long illness. He was buried in Arlington National Cemetery, Arlington County, Virginia with other military heroes, where his contributions will never be forgotten.

== Medal of Honor citation ==
Technical Sergeant Everhart's official Medal of Honor citation reads:

He commanded a platoon that bore the brunt of a desperate enemy counterattack near Korling, France, before dawn on 12 November 1944. When German tanks and self-propelled guns penetrated his left flank and overwhelming infantry forces threatened to overrun the 1 remaining machinegun in that section, he ran 400 yards through woods churned by artillery and mortar concentrations to strengthen the defense. With the 1 remaining gunner, he directed furious fire into the advancing hordes until they swarmed close to the position. He left the gun, boldly charged the attackers and, after a 15-minute exchange of hand grenades, forced them to withdraw leaving 30 dead behind. He re-crossed the fire-swept terrain to his then threatened right flank, exhorted his men and directed murderous fire from the single machinegun at that position. There, in the light of bursting mortar shells, he again closed with the enemy in a hand grenade duel and, after a fierce 30-minute battle, forced the Germans to withdraw leaving another 20 dead. The gallantry and intrepidity of T/Sgt. Everhart in rallying his men and refusing to fall back in the face of terrible odds were highly instrumental in repelling the fanatical enemy counterattack directed at the American bridgehead across the Moselle River.

== Awards and decorations ==

1st row	Medal of Honor		
2nd row	Purple Heart	Army Good Conduct Medal	American Defense Service Medal
3rd row	American Campaign Medal	European–African–Middle Eastern Campaign Medal with 1 campaign star	World War II Victory Medal

== See also ==
- List of Medal of Honor recipients
- List of Medal of Honor recipients for World War II
