= Col Mitchell =

Australian rules footballer, born 1914

Personal information
- Full name: Colin Mitchell
- Born: 6 June 1914; Footscray, Victoria
- Died: 29 August 1986 (aged 72); Footscray, Victoria
- Original team: West Footscray
- Height: 182 cm (6 ft 0 in)
- Weight: 79 kg (174 lb)

Playing career^{1}
Years	Club	Games (Goals)
1935–37	Footscray	12 (2)
1937–39	North Melbourne	12 (10)
Total		24 (12)
- ^{1} Playing statistics correct to the end of 1939.

Colin Mitchell (6 June 1914 – 29 August 1986) was an Australian rules footballer who played with Footscray and North Melbourne in the Victorian Football League (VFL).
