= Jacques Bonnet =

French field hockey player

Personal information
- Nationality: French
- Born: 18 September 1938 Angers, France
- Died: 22 August 1986 (aged 47) Deauville, France

Sport
- Sport: Field hockey

Jacques Roger Gaston Bonnet (18 September 1938 – 22 August 1986) was a French field hockey player. He competed in the men's tournament at the 1960 Summer Olympics.
