= Gordon Webber (author) =

American writer

Gordon Webber (October 25, 1912 – August 30, 1986) was an American writer.

Webber was born in Linden, Michigan, the son of Roy Eugene and Dorothea Boyd Webber. He graduated (c. 1934) from Jamestown College in Jamestown, ND, upon which he modeled the college in his "The Great Buffalo Hotel." From 1938 to 1948 he worked at NBC as a script writer and editor. Following this, he worked at Benton & Bowles, an advertising company, until 1975. He died in Montauk, New York of leukemia. He was married to Jeanne Curtis and is survived by three daughters, Jacqueline Webber, Dorothea Walker and Laura Circle.

== Notable works ==
- Years of Eden - 1951
- The Far Shore - 1954
- What End But Love - 1959
- The Great Buffalo Hotel - 1979
- Our Kind of People - 1979
