= Margaret Wood Bancroft =

American naturalist and explorer (1893–1986)

- Margaret Wood Bancroft. (Photo: San Diego Natural History Museum Research Library)
- Born: July 10, 1893; Glasgow, Kentucky
- Died: August 30, 1986 (aged 93); San Diego, California
- Scientific career
- Fields: Natural History
- Workplaces: San Diego Natural History Museum

Margaret R. Wood Bancroft (July 10, 1893, in Glasgow, Kentucky – August 30, 1986, in San Diego, California), was an American naturalist and explorer of Baja California.

== Biography ==
Born on July 10, 1893, in Glasgow, Kentucky, Margaret Wood was raised on a ranch in the San Diego back country and was briefly a silent movie actress (1913–1917), working with Hobart Bosworth, Dustin Farnum, Mack Sennett, D.W. Griffith, and Mabel Normand.

She married ornithologist and oölogist Griffing Bancroft (son of historian Hubert Howe Bancroft) in 1917. She was active in the social and political life of San Diego County, with membership in the Red Cross, the Junior League, and the San Diego Society of Natural History. In 1930, she participated in a five-month journey to explore and document the bird and animal life of the Baja California coastline. The expedition included ornithologist Adriaan Joseph van Rossem (California School of Technology), zoologist Donald Ryder Dickey (California School of Technology), F. S. Rogers (San Diego Natural History Museum), Albert Kroeckel, and J. Elton Green (University of California, Berkeley); Griffing Bancroft published a memoir of the journey in 1932, The Flight of the Least Petrel.

In 1935, Bancroft led a small expedition to search for the legendary lost mission of Santa Ysabel in the Sierra de San Pedro Mártir, Baja California. She discovered cave symbols that contributed to the archaeological study of the migration of ancient Native American tribes. Bancroft traveled extensively on oölogical and archaeological expeditions to Baja California, Sonora, and the islands of the Gulf of California.

Interested in many areas of natural history, Bancroft collected snake specimens for the herpetologist Laurence Klauber; in 1943, he named a new subspecies of Sonora semiannulata after her, Sonora bancroftae (San Telmo ground snake). From snake specimens Bancroft collected in 1932 on Isla San Geronimo, Baja California Norte, herpetologist Charles E. Shaw identified the species Anniella geronimensis (1940).

In 1971, Bancroft donated the Griffing Bancroft Library, with significant volumes on the history of the West, California, and Baja California, to the University of California, San Diego. She died in La Jolla, San Diego, California, on August 30, 1986.

== Legacy ==
The San Diego Natural History Museum Research Library houses a significant collection of Margaret Wood Bancroft's personal scrapbooks, letters, writings, and photographs.

The Bancroft Library at the University of California, Berkeley holds extensive archival material related to the Bancroft family including works by and about Griffing and Margaret Wood Bancroft.

== Footnotes ==
=== Sources ===
- “2 women will ride burros into Mexico wilds to seek gold.” San Diego Sun, November 4, 1935.
- Bancroft, Griffing. Lower California: A Cruise: The Flight of the Least Petrel. New York, London: G.P. Putnam's sons, 1932. http://catalog.hathitrust.org/Record/000276850.
- “Bancroft, Griffing – WikiName.” Islapedia. http://islapedia.com/index.php?title=BANCROFT,_Griffing.
- “Bancroft, Margaret Wood (1893–1986).” San Diego Natural History Museum. https://www.sdnhm.org/about-us/history/bancroft-margaret-wood/
- Bancroft, Margaret Wood, Bancroft Library. Regional Oral History Office, James David Hart, Virginia M. Smith, and Willa K. Baum. Recollections of Hubert Howe Bancroft and the Bancroft Family : Oral History Transcript / and Related Material, 1977–1980. Berkeley: Regents of the University of California, 1980. https://archive.org/details/margaretwoodreco00bancrich.
- “Griffing Bancroft Library donated to UCSD, March 11, 1971, University Communications & Public Relations Materials: News Releases." Special Collection & Archives, UC San Diego Library,” March 11, 1971. http://library.ucsd.edu/historyofucsd/index.html#ark:bb8704405q.
- Hunt, L. E. (1983). A nomenclatural rearrangement of the genus Anniella (Sauria: Anniellidae). Copeia, 1983(1), 79–89. http://doi.org/10.2307/1444700
- Klauber, Laurence M. “A new snake of the genus Sonora from Lower California, Mexico.” Transactions of the San Diego Society of Natural History 10, no. 4 (December 30, 1943): 69–70.
- “Margaret Bancroft, 93, dies; social leader, Baja explorer.” San Diego Union, August 31, 1986.
- "Mrs. Bancroft finds new clues to fabled mission." San Diego Sun, January 4, 1936, pp. Al–A2.
- "Two women to seek fabled lost mission." Los Angeles Times, November 4, 1935.
