= Ronald Taylor =

English cricketer

Ronald Alfred Taylor (25 March 1909 – 29 August 1986) was an English first-class cricketer active 1932–35 who played for Nottinghamshire. He was born and died in Nottingham.
