= George Palmer (Leicestershire cricketer) =

English cricketer

Personal information
- Full name: George Harry Palmer
- Born: 24 October 1917; Ibstock, Leicestershire, England
- Died: 11 March 2012 (aged 94); Campbelltown, South Australia, Australia
- Batting: Right-handed
- Bowling: Right-arm medium
- Relatives: John Palmer (father)

Domestic team information
- Years: Team
- 1938–1939: Leicestershire

Career statistics
Competition	First-class
Matches	5
Runs scored	31
Batting average	6.20
100s/50s	–/–
Top score	14*
Balls bowled	733
Wickets	12
Bowling average	26.66
5 wickets in innings	–
10 wickets in match	–
Best bowling	3/36
Catches/stumpings	3/–
- Source: Cricinfo, 13 February 2013

George Harry Palmer (24 October 1917 – 11 March 2012) was an English cricketer. Palmer was a right-handed batsman who bowled right-arm medium pace. He was born at Ibstock, Leicestershire.

Palmer made his first-class debut for Leicestershire against Worcestershire in the 1938 County Championship at Park Road, Loughborough. He made four further first-class appearances for the county, the last of which came against Hampshire in the 1939 County Championship. In his five matches, he took 12 wickets at an average of 26.66, with best figures of 3/36. With the bat he scored 31 runs at an average of 6.20, with a high score of 14 not out.

His father John also played first-class cricket.
