= Gérard Gasiorowski =

French artist (1930–1986)

- Born: 1930
- Died: 1986 (aged 55–56)
- Occupation: Painter

Gérard Gasiorowski (1930–1986) was a French photographer, painter, and fictive artist.

== Life and work ==
Gasiorowski was born in Paris on March 30, 1930. He studied at the School of Applied Arts between 1947 and 1951, and he married Marie-Claude Charels in 1963. His work, which was strongly linked with the emergence of Pop Art, matured between 1964 and 1972. He based many of his paintings on images collected through Delpire, the publishing house where he worked as a librarian. His photorealistic reproductions of enlarged black-and-white photographs have affinities both with the images in family albums and with publicity photos. Despite the success of these works, Gasiorowski turned away from painting (but not drawing) after 1972. His work changed radically as he became more critical of the tradition of western painting and the structure of the art world, and he turned to photomontage to express his ideas in works such as The Horrors of War. To stage these photos, he created miniature battlefield sets using purchased and homemade toy planes, trains, tanks, and so on. He even costumed himself with a bloody head bandage to serve as one of the wounded. Gasiorowski himself later saw his obsession with this work as one reason that his wife left him in 1976.

Another tack Gasiorowski took in his critical investigations was to begin creating fictive artworks such as Worosiskiga Academy, a fake art school run by a tyrant (the name is an anagram of his own last name) which produced a variety of artworks, from drawings and gouaches to objects. One such issue was a set of hats signed with the names of 500 famous artists, intended as a critique of the art market and of the compromises it forced on artists. The first exhibition of the Worosiskiga Academy project was at the Galerie Maeght in 1981; despite the dismal failure of this show, the gallery continue to support and exhibit works by Gasiorowski. The Museum of Modern Art, Paris held a retrospective of his work in 1983.

Gasiorowski's fictions succeeded in confusing visitors to his exhibitions. It was difficult for audiences of the time to know what to make of—for example—an imaginary artist named Kiga, a member of the 'Worosis' tribe, who was the embodiment of 'primitive' painting and who mixed her paints from excrement and aromatic plants to make paintings in the style of Cézanne. Gasiorowski's fictive productions took a wide range of forms: paintings, drawings, painted objects, organic sculptures.

After 1983, Gasiorowski finally returned to painting and developed several bodies of work, often at monumental scale, in which the groups of paintings were understood to form a single larger work. His final work was a 12-panel polyptych, Fertility.

He died suddenly of a heart attack on August 19, 1986, in Lyon, and is buried there in Saint-Julien-du-Sault cemetery.

His work is included in the collection of the National Gallery of Canada.
