= George Palmer (Warwickshire cricketer) =

English cricketer

Personal information
- Full name: George Arthur Palmer
- Born: 5 June 1897; Withybrook, Warwickshire, England
- Died: 1 June 1962 (aged 64); Higham on the Hill, Leicestershire, England
- Batting: Right-handed
- Bowling: Right-arm fast-medium

Domestic team information
- Years: Team
- 1928: Warwickshire

Career statistics
Competition	First-class
Matches	9
Runs scored	87
Batting average	8.70
100s/50s	–/–
Top score	20
Balls bowled	1,074
Wickets	8
Bowling average	56.25
5 wickets in innings	–
10 wickets in match	–
Best bowling	2/21
Catches/stumpings	7/–
- Source: Cricinfo, 26 October 2015

George Arthur Palmer (5 June 1897 – 1 June 1962) was an English cricketer active in first-class cricket in 1928, making nine appearances as a right-arm fast-medium bowler for Warwickshire.

Palmer made his debut in first-class cricket when he was selected to play for Warwickshire in the County Championship against Glamorgan at Edgbaston. He made eight more appearances in that season, playing his final match for Warwickshire against Leicestershire. He bowled with little success in his nine first-class matches, taking 8 wickets at an expensive average of 56.25, with best figures of 2/21. As a batsman, he scored 87 runs in ten innings, with a high score of 20.

He died at Higham on the Hill in Leicestershire on 1 June 1962.
