= Kim Williams (writer) =

Naturalist, writer, radio personality

- Born: Elizabeth Ardea Kandiko; September 23, 1923; Gallatin Township, New York
- Died: August 6, 1986 (aged 62); Missoula, Montana
- Occupations: Naturalist, writer, and guest commentator on National Public Radio
- Height: 5 ft 2 in (four months before death)
- Spouse: Mel Williams (1951–1986)

Kim Williams (September 23, 1923 – August 6, 1986) was an American naturalist, writer, and the longest-ever running guest commenter on NPR where she was a guest commentator on the radio show All Things Considered for over ten years.

== Biography ==
Kim Williams was born on September 23, 1923, as Elizabeth Ardea Kandiko, the fourth of seven children of Hungarian immigrants. She grew up on a farm in the Gallatin Township in New York and attended and graduated from Hudson High School and subsequently Cornell University where she graduated with a degree in human ecology with a minor in botany.

After graduation she took jobs at various publications such as the Los Angeles Examiner and Flower Grower magazine, and she started writing poetry and short prose based on personal experience. In 1951, she met and married Mel Williams and moved to Santiago, Chile for twenty years. In Chile, Williams wrote poems, plays, short stories, a newspaper column, and taught English at the Catholic University of Chile. While in Chile she also and wrote and published her first two books, High Heels in the Andes and Wild Animals of Chile.

In 1971, she and her husband returned to the United States, settling in Missoula, Montana, where she lived the rest of her life. She returned to college and received a master's degree in Interdisciplinary Studies from the University of Montana in 1981. Also while living in Missoula she published her final two books, Eating Wild Plants and Kim Williams' Book of Uncommon Sense: A Practical Guide With 10 Rules for Nearly Everything. In addition, she occasionally taught classes on edible wild plants at the University of Montana and wrote a newspaper column on wildflowers and plants for the Missoulian which would lead to her getting a radio show on Montana Public Radio, and subsequently a radio show on NPR where she had as many 2.5 million listeners.

Williams was elected in 1974 to serve on the City Government Study Commission in Missoula, and she also ran unsuccessfully for a seat in the Montana House of Representatives in 1978. In 1986 Williams announced on the radio program All Things Considered three weeks before her death that she had terminal cancer and was refusing chemotherapy. On July 16, 1986, during her last radio broadcast, she said to All Things Considered co-host Susan Stamberg "I wish to die in peace, not in pieces." Her death was mourned and recognized throughout the United States, with commentaries in The New York Times, and The New Yorker.

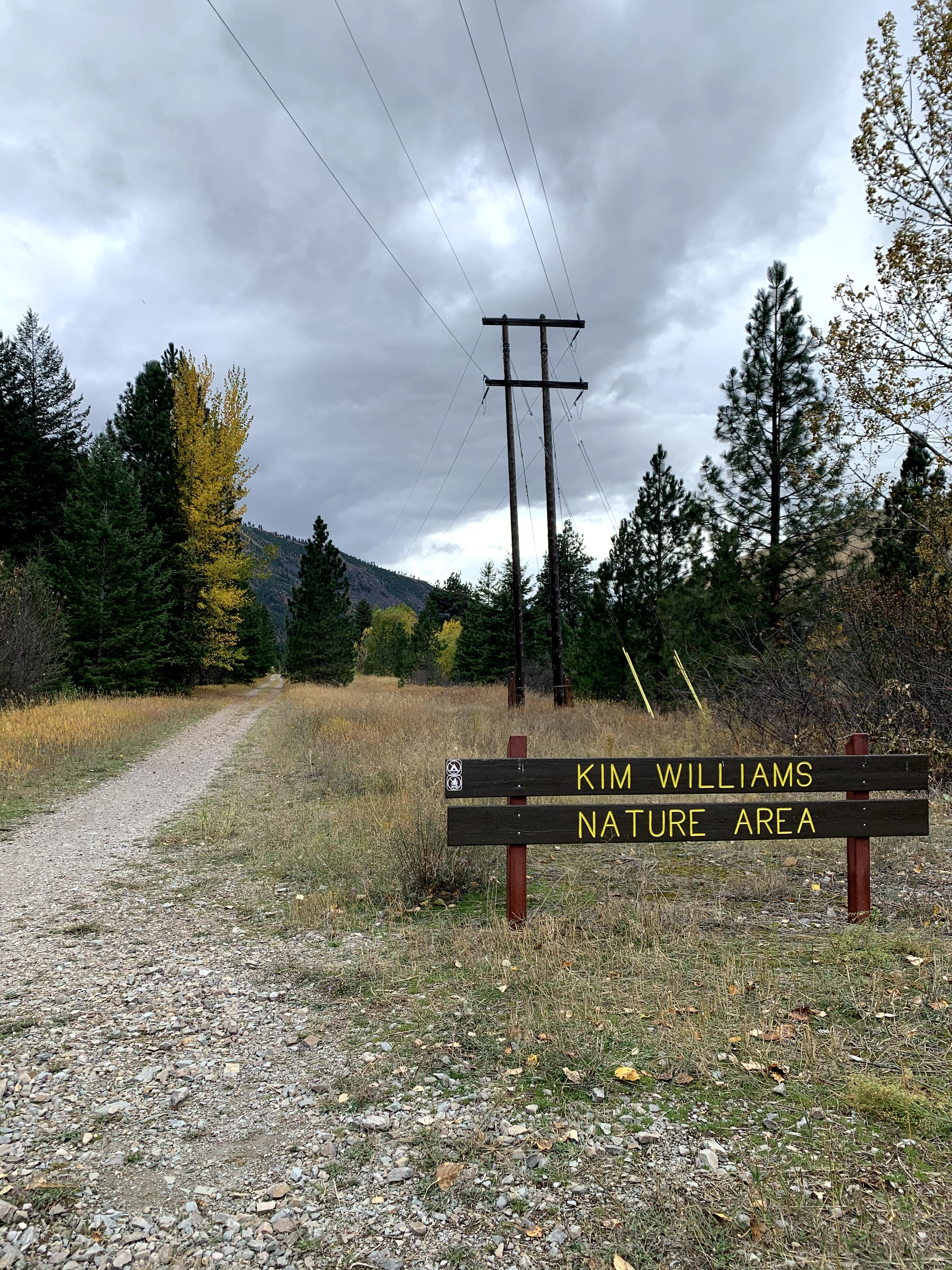
Sign at the eastern end of the Kim Williams Trail

A trail along the Clark Fork River in Missoula was named in her memory in 1987, and the Kim Williams Graduate Fellowship was founded for journalism students at the University of Montana.
