= Harleigh Trecker =

American social worker, academic, and administrator

- Born: Harleigh Bradley Trecker; February 11, 1911; Cabery, Illinois, US
- Died: August 26, 1986 (aged 75); Sanford, Florida
- Occupations: Social worker, college professor, academic administrator
- Title: Professor of Social Work

Academic background
- Education: George Williams College (BS); University of Chicago (MS)

Academic work
- Discipline: Social work
- Institutions: University of Southern California; University of Connecticut

Harleigh Bradley Trecker (1911–1986) was an American social work academic and administrator who served as the dean of the School of Social Work at the University of Connecticut from 1951 to 1968. UConn's campus library in Hartford was named in his honor until it closed in 2017.

== Early life and education ==
Trecker was born on February 11, 1911, in Cabery, Illinois, the son of William Henry and Henrietta Trecker. He received his Bachelor of Arts degree from George Williams College in 1934 and his Master of Science degree from the University of Chicago in 1938.

== Career ==
Trecker taught at George Williams College from 1938 to 1941, when he accepted a position on the faculty of the University of Southern California. He served as dean of the School of Social Work at the University of Connecticut from 1951 to 1968. He returned to the faculty as Professor of Social Work in 1968, retiring in 1977. UConn's campus library in Hartford, where the School of Social Work was located, was named in his honor.

Trecker was professionally active in the National Conference on Social Welfare, the National Association of Social Workers, and the Council of Social Work Education. His awards and distinctions included a citation from the American Association of Social Workers (1951), a certificate of recognition from the Connecticut Social Welfare Conference (1967), and a certificate of recognition for outstanding service from UConn in 1977.

Trecker's research focused on social work administration, group work, and boards of community service agencies. He authored, coauthored, or edited 21 books, 46 academic journal articles, and 15 community research studies. His works were translated into eight languages.

== Personal life ==
Trecker was married to Audrey Trecker, Republican registrar of voters for West Hartford. They had two sons: Jerrold Trecker, who became a Hartford Courant sportswriter, and James Trecker. Harleigh Trecker died on August 26, 1986, at his home in Sanford, Florida.
