= Harry Giles (footballer) =

Australian rules footballer (1911–1986)

Personal information
- Full name: Harry Charles Giles
- Born: 10 August 1911; St Kilda, Victoria
- Died: 4 August 1986 (aged 74); Mulwala, New South Wales
- Original team: North Brighton
- Height: 171 cm (5 ft 7 in)
- Weight: 68 kg (150 lb)
- Position: Rover

Playing career^{1}
Years	Club	Games (Goals)
1934	Essendon	9 (6)
- ^{1} Playing statistics correct to the end of 1934.

Harry Charles Giles (also known as Harry Gyles, 10 August 1911 – 4 August 1986) was an Australian rules footballer who played with Essendon in the Victorian Football League (VFL).
