= Anne Bahlke =

American physician (1903–1986)

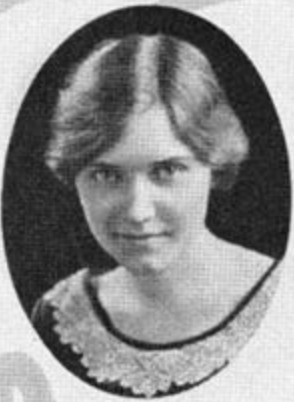
- Anne Bahlke, from the 1926 yearbook of Goucher College
- Born: Anne Magdalen Bahlke; May 9, 1903; Baltimore, Maryland
- Died: August 7, 1986 (aged 83); Albany, New York
- Education: Goucher College
- Occupations: Physician, medical researcher, public health official

Anne Magdalen Bahlke (May 9, 1903 – August 7, 1986) was an American physician, medical researcher and public health official.

== Early life and education ==
Anne Magdalen Bahlke was born in Baltimore, Maryland, the daughter of Alexander W. Bahlke and Ella Gertrude Clautice Bahlke. She was raised in Baltimore by her widowed mother. She graduated from Goucher College in 1926. She earned her medical degree at Johns Hopkins School of Medicine in 1936. She pursued further training in epidemiology at the Johns Hopkins School of Hygiene and Public Health. She was a member of Phi Beta Kappa.

== Career ==
Bahlke was a medical consultant in the New York State Department of Health's Division of Communicable Diseases in 1940s. in 1950 she became assistant director, then director, of the department's Bureau of Medical Rehabilitation, at a time when the state's services for disabled adults and children were rapidly expanding, under new legislation at the state and national levels. She retired in 1973.

== Publications ==
- "Epidemic Influenza: A Comparison of Clinical Observation in a Major and a Minor Epidemic" (1933, with James A. Doull)
- "Epidemiology of Pneumococcus Pneumonia" (1943, with Edward S. Rogers and Albert H. Harris)
- "Treatment of preparalytic poliomyelitis with gamma globulin" (1945, with James E. Perkins)
- "Exposed Dental Pulp as a Portal of Entry for the Virus of Poliomyelitis" (1947, with S. Finn and Robert F. Korns)
- "Effect of ultra-violet irradiation of classrooms on spread of measles in large rural central schools" (1947, with James E. Perkins and Hilda Freeman Silverman)
- "Effect of Ultra-Violet Irradiation of Classrooms on Spread of Mumps and Chickenpox in Large Rural Central Schools —A Progress Report" (1949, with Hilda Freeman Silverman and Hollis S. Ingraham)
- "Rehabilitation of the Handicapped: The Place of the Official Agency" (1953)
- "Development of a State-Wide Program for the Care of Children with Long-Term Illness" (1965, with Edward R. Shlesinger and Alan R. Cohen)

== Personal life ==
Bahlke died in 1986, in Albany, New York, aged 83 years.
