= Sid Meehl =

Australian rules footballer (1914–1986)

Personal information
- Full name: Alfred Sydney Meehl
- Born: 26 January 1914; Brunswick, Victoria
- Died: 23 August 1986 (aged 72); Port Fairy, Victoria
- Original team: West Coburg

Playing career^{1}
Years	Club	Games (Goals)
1934–36, 1938	Melbourne	24 (2)
- ^{1} Playing statistics correct to the end of 1938.

Alfred Sydney Meehl (26 January 1914 – 23 August 1986) was an Australian rules footballer who played with Melbourne in the Victorian Football League (VFL).

Meehl later served in the Australian Army during World War II.
