= Alfred Pilkington =

English cricketer

Alfred Frederick Pilkington (22 April 1901 – 27 August 1986) was an English first-class cricketer active 1925–28 who played for Surrey. He was born in Camberwell; died in Epsom.
