= George Palmer (Australian cricketer) =

Australian cricketer

Personal information
- Born: 2 August 1903; Adelaide, Australia
- Died: 24 August 1986 (aged 83)
- Source: Cricinfo, 18 September 2020

George Palmer (2 August 1903 – 24 August 1986) was an Australian cricketer. He played in nine first-class matches for South Australia between 1924 and 1930.

== See also ==
- List of South Australian representative cricketers
