= Gymnastics at the 1964 Summer Olympics – Men's pommel horse =

Olympic gymnastics event

Men's pommel horse at the Games of the XVIII Olympiad
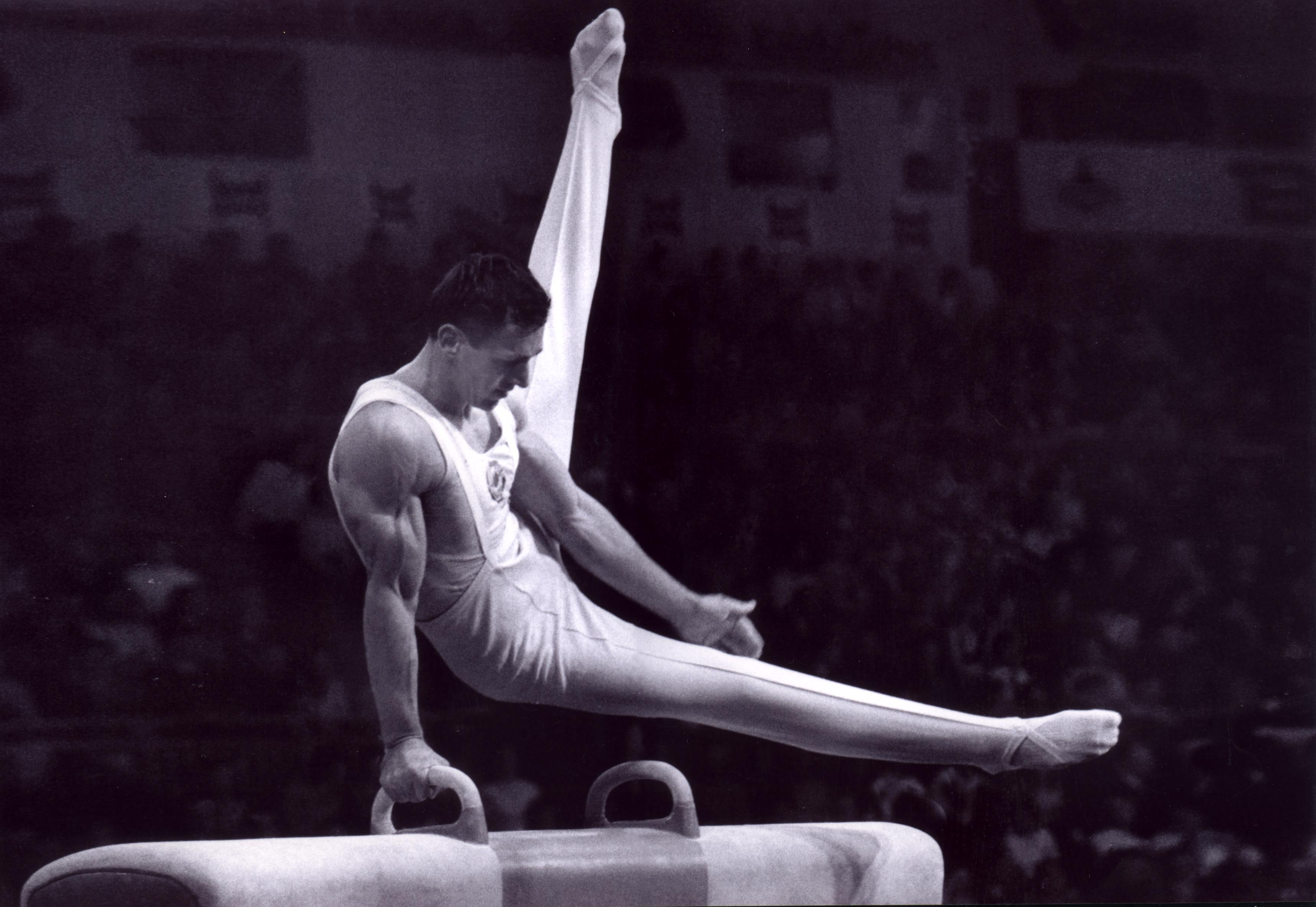
- Miroslav Cerar on the pommel horse
- Venue: Tokyo Metropolitan Gymnasium
- Date: 18–22 October 1964
- Competitors: 128 from 29 nations
- Winning score: 19.525

Medalists
1st place, gold medalist(s)		Miroslav Cerar; Yugoslavia
2nd place, silver medalist(s)		Shuji Tsurumi; Japan
3rd place, bronze medalist(s)		Yury Tsapenko; Soviet Union

The men's pommel horse was a gymnastics event contested as part of the Gymnastics at the 1964 Summer Olympics programme at the Tokyo Metropolitan Gymnasium. The event was held on 18, 20, and 22 October. There were 128 competitors from 29 nations, with nations in the team competition having up to 6 gymnasts and other nations entering up to 3 gymnasts. The event was won by Miroslav Cerar of Yugoslavia, the nation's first medal in the pommel horse. Silver went to Shuji Tsurumi of Japan, the third man to win multiple medals in the event (adding to his 1960 bronze). Yury Tsapenko of the Soviet Union took bronze, breaking a three-Games gold medal streak for the Soviets.

== Background ==
This was the 11th appearance of the event, which is one of the five apparatus events held every time there were apparatus events at the Summer Olympics (no apparatus events were held in 1900, 1908, 1912, or 1920). All six finalists from 1960 returned: joint gold medalists Eugen Ekman of Finland and Boris Shakhlin of the Soviet Union (who had also won gold in 1956), bronze medalist Shuji Tsurumi of Japan, fourth-place finisher Takashi Mitsukuri of Japan, fifth-place finisher Yury Titov of the Soviet Union, and sixth-place finisher Takashi Ono of Japan. Miroslav Cerar of Yugoslavia was the reigning (1962) world champion; Shakhlin had finished second and Mitsukuri third.

Algeria, the Republic of China, Iran, and Mongolia each made their debut in the men's pommel horse. The United States made its 10th appearance, most of any nation, having missed only the inaugural 1896 Games.

== Competition format ==
The gymnastics all-around events continued to use the aggregation format. Each nation entered a team of six gymnasts or up to two individual gymnasts. All entrants in the gymnastics competitions performed both a compulsory exercise and a voluntary exercise for each apparatus. The scores for all 12 exercises were summed to give an individual all-around score.

These exercise scores were also used for qualification for the apparatus finals. The two exercises (compulsory and voluntary) for each apparatus were summed to give an apparatus score; the top 6 in each apparatus participated in the finals; others were ranked 7th through 128th. For the apparatus finals, the all-around score for that apparatus was multiplied by one-half then added to the final round exercise score to give a final total.

Exercise scores ranged from 0 to 10, with the final total apparatus score from 0 to 20.

== Schedule ==
All times are Japan Standard Time (UTC+9)

Date	Time	Round
Sunday, 18 October 1964	8:30; 17:00	Preliminary: Compulsory
Tuesday, 20 October 1964	8:30; 17:00	Preliminary: Voluntary
Friday, 22 October 1964	18:00	Final

== Results ==
Each gymnast competed in both compulsory and optional exercises, with the median scores from the four judges for the two sets of exercises were summed. This score was also used in calculating both individual all-around and team scores.

The top 6 advanced to the final for the apparatus, keeping half of their preliminary score to be added to their final score.

Rank	Gymnast	Nation	Preliminary			Final		
Rank	Gymnast	Nation	Compulsory	Voluntary	Total	1/2 Prelim.	Final	Total
1st place, gold medalist(s)	Miroslav Cerar	Yugoslavia	9.70	9.75	19.45	9.725	9.800	19.525
2nd place, silver medalist(s)	Shuji Tsurumi	Japan	9.55	9.70	19.25	9.625	9.700	19.325
3rd place, bronze medalist(s)	Yury Tsapenko	Soviet Union	9.55	9.55	19.10	9.550	9.650	19.200
4	Yamashita Haruhiro	Japan	9.50	9.65	19.15	9.575	9.500	19.075
5	Harald Wigaard	Norway	9.50	9.55	19.05	9.525	9.400	18.925
6	Mitsukuri Takashi	Japan	9.65	9.65	19.30	9.650	9.000	18.650
7	Takuji Hayata	Japan	9.40	9.50	18.90	Did not advance		
7	Takashi Ono	Japan	9.50	9.40	18.90	Did not advance		
7	Boris Shakhlin	Soviet Union	9.45	9.45	18.90	Did not advance		
10	Arthur Shurlock	United States	9.30	9.55	18.85	Did not advance		
11	Siegfried Fulle	United Team of Germany	9.30	9.50	18.80	Did not advance		
11	Kim Choong Tai	South Korea	9.45	9.35	18.80	Did not advance		
11	Franco Menichelli	Italy	9.30	9.50	18.80	Did not advance		
14	Sergey Diomidov	Soviet Union	9.35	9.40	18.75	Did not advance		
14	Victor Lisitsky	Soviet Union	9.35	9.40	18.75	Did not advance		
14	Age Storhaug	Norway	9.45	9.30	18.75	Did not advance		
17	Luigi Cimnaghi	Italy	9.30	9.40	18.70	Did not advance		
17	Eugen Ekman	Finland	9.45	9.25	18.70	Did not advance		
17	Endo Yukio	Japan	9.60	9.10	18.70	Did not advance		
17	Mikolaj Kubica	Poland	9.50	9.20	18.70	Did not advance		
17	Victor Leontyev	Soviet Union	9.40	9.20	18.70	Did not advance		
22	Philipp Furst	United Team of Germany	9.15	9.50	18.65	Did not advance		
22	Kauko Heikkinen	Finland	9.25	9.40	18.65	Did not advance		
22	Walter Muller	Switzerland	9.35	9.30	18.65	Did not advance		
25	Erwin Koppe	United Team of Germany	9.20	9.40	18.60	Did not advance		
25	Bohumil Mudrik	Czechoslovakia	9.20	9.40	18.60	Did not advance		
25	Yuri Titov	Soviet Union	9.45	9.15	18.60	Did not advance		
28	Istvan Aranyos	Hungary	9.25	9.30	18.55	Did not advance		
28	Liuben Christov	Bulgaria	9.30	9.25	18.55	Did not advance		
28	Rajmund Csanyi	Hungary	9.30	9.25	18.55	Did not advance		
28	Fritz Feuz	Switzerland	9.30	9.25	18.55	Did not advance		
28	Pavel Gajdos	Czechoslovakia	9.10	9.45	18.55	Did not advance		
28	Christian Guiffroy	France	9.30	9.25	18.55	Did not advance		
28	Klaus Köste	United Team of Germany	9.20	9.35	18.55	Did not advance		
28	Frederic Orendi	Romania	9.20	9.35	18.55	Did not advance		
36	Raimo Heinonen	Finland	9.20	9.30	18.50	Did not advance		
36	Makoto Sakamoto	United States	9.25	9.25	18.50	Did not advance		
36	Angelo Vicardi	Italy	9.20	9.30	18.50	Did not advance		
39	Russell Mitchell	United States	9.20	9.25	18.45	Did not advance		
40	Wilhelm Kubica	Poland	9.35	9.05	18.40	Did not advance		
40	Ladislav Pazdera	Czechoslovakia	9.05	9.35	18.40	Did not advance		
40	Nicola Prodanov	Bulgaria	9.20	9.20	18.40	Did not advance		
40	Peter Weber	United Team of Germany	9.10	9.30	18.40	Did not advance		
44	Suh Jae Kyu	South Korea	9.15	9.20	18.35	Did not advance		
45	Larry Banner	United States	9.35	8.95	18.30	Did not advance		
45	Bruno Franceschetti	Italy	9.05	9.25	18.30	Did not advance		
45	Olli Laiho	Finland	9.50	8.80	18.30	Did not advance		
45	Josy Stoffel	Luxembourg	9.20	9.10	18.30	Did not advance		
45	Nenad Vidovic	Yugoslavia	9.20	9.10	18.30	Did not advance		
50	Pasquale Carminucci	Italy	9.05	9.20	18.25	Did not advance		
50	Fredy Egger	Switzerland	9.10	9.15	18.25	Did not advance		
50	Richard Kihn	Canada	9.10	9.15	18.25	Did not advance		
50	Hannu Rantakari	Finland	9.10	9.15	18.25	Did not advance		
54	Michel Bouchonnet	France	9.00	9.20	18.20	Did not advance		
54	Giovanni Carminucci	Italy	8.90	9.30	18.20	Did not advance		
54	Bernard Fauqueux	France	9.15	9.05	18.20	Did not advance		
54	Leif Koorn	Sweden	9.25	8.95	18.20	Did not advance		
54	Alfred Kucharczyk	Poland	9.05	9.15	18.20	Did not advance		
54	Alojz Petrovic	Yugoslavia	9.35	8.85	18.20	Did not advance		
60	Todor Batchvarov	Bulgaria	9.00	9.15	18.15	Did not advance		
60	Ivan Caklec	Yugoslavia	9.00	9.15	18.15	Did not advance		
60	Gottlieb Fassler	Switzerland	9.10	9.05	18.15	Did not advance		
60	Velik Kapsasov	Bulgaria	9.00	9.15	18.15	Did not advance		
60	Todor Kondev	Bulgaria	9.10	9.05	18.15	Did not advance		
60	Georgi Mirtchev	Bulgaria	9.20	8.95	18.15	Did not advance		
60	Lajos Varga	Hungary	9.10	9.05	18.15	Did not advance		
67	Ronald Barak	United States	9.10	9.00	18.10	Did not advance		
67	Aleksander Rokosa	Poland	9.35	8.75	18.10	Did not advance		
69	Janez Brodnik	Yugoslavia	9.00	9.05	18.05	Did not advance		
69	Petre Miclaus	Romania	9.10	8.95	18.05	Did not advance		
69	Gregor Weiss	United States	9.25	8.80	18.05	Did not advance		
72	Otto Kestola	Finland	8.90	9.10	18.00	Did not advance		
72	Mohamed Lazhari	Algeria	9.05	8.95	18.00	Did not advance		
72	Gunter Lyhs	United Team of Germany	8.80	9.20	18.00	Did not advance		
72	Gheorghe Tohaneanu	Romania	9.00	9.00	18.00	Did not advance		
76	Gheorghe Condovici	Romania	8.80	9.15	17.95	Did not advance		
76	Karel Klecka	Czechoslovakia	8.75	9.20	17.95	Did not advance		
78	Kim Kwang Duk	South Korea	9.00	8.85	17.85	Did not advance		
78	Andras Lelkes	Hungary	9.05	8.80	17.85	Did not advance		
80	Franz Fah	Switzerland	8.90	8.90	17.80	Did not advance		
80	Octavio Suarez	Cuba	9.00	8.80	17.80	Did not advance		
82	Lee Kwang Jae	South Korea	9.35	8.40	17.75	Did not advance		
83	Anton Kadar	Romania	9.20	8.50	17.70	Did not advance		
83	Alexandru Szilagyi	Romania	8.95	8.75	17.70	Did not advance		
85	Jan Jankowicz	Poland	9.05	8.50	17.55	Did not advance		
85	Martin Srot	Yugoslavia	8.40	9.15	17.55	Did not advance		
87	Gyozo Cser	Hungary	8.80	8.70	17.50	Did not advance		
87	William Thoresson	Sweden	8.95	8.55	17.50	Did not advance		
89	Frederick Trainer	Australia	8.60	8.85	17.45	Did not advance		
90	Vaclav Kubicka	Czechoslovakia	8.95	8.45	17.40	Did not advance		
91	Stig Lindevall	Sweden	8.80	8.50	17.30	Did not advance		
92	Chung Yi Kwang	South Korea	8.15	9.10	17.25	Did not advance		
92	Niamdawaa Zagdbazar	Mongolia	8.70	8.55	17.25	Did not advance		
94	Andrzej Konopka	Poland	9.20	8.00	17.20	Did not advance		
95	Wilhelm Weiler	Canada	8.45	8.65	17.10	Did not advance		
96	Graham Bond	Australia	8.50	8.55	17.05	Did not advance		
96	Peter Sos	Hungary	8.90	8.15	17.05	Did not advance		
98	Premysl Krbec	Czechoslovakia	7.80	9.15	16.95	Did not advance		
99	Meinrad Berchtold	Switzerland	7.70	9.20	16.90	Did not advance		
99	Andres Gonzalez	Cuba	8.80	8.10	16.90	Did not advance		
101	Felix Padron	Cuba	8.75	8.10	16.85	Did not advance		
101	Carlos Pizzini	Argentina	8.70	8.15	16.85	Did not advance		
103	John Pancott	Great Britain	8.10	8.60	16.70	Did not advance		
104	Gilbert Larose	Canada	8.80	7.85	16.65	Did not advance		
105	Douglas McLennon	Australia	7.85	8.70	16.55	Did not advance		
106	Marcus Faulks	Australia	8.15	7.75	15.90	Did not advance		
107	Benjamin de Roo	Australia	8.15	7.70	15.85	Did not advance		
108	Jan Thai San	Taiwan	8.10	7.70	15.80	Did not advance		
109	Héctor Ramírez	Cuba	8.10	7.50	15.60	Did not advance		
110	Kang Soo Il	South Korea	7.75	7.65	15.40	Did not advance		
111	Pablo Hernandez	Cuba	7.95	7.40	15.35	Did not advance		
111	John Mulhall	Great Britain	8.00	7.35	15.35	Did not advance		
113	Jalal Bazargan	Iran	7.55	7.60	15.15	Did not advance		
114	Ady Stefanetti	Luxembourg	6.35	8.45	14.80	Did not advance		
115	Anant Ram	India	7.20	7.45	14.65	Did not advance		
116	Lai Chu Long	Taiwan	7.00	7.60	14.60	Did not advance		
117	Barry Cheales	Australia	6.95	7.35	14.30	Did not advance		
118	B. Bhosle	India	7.45	6.45	13.90	Did not advance		
119	Lee Bu Ti	Taiwan	6.50	6.90	13.40	Did not advance		
120	Carlos Garcia	Cuba	7.75	5.40	13.15	Did not advance		
121	Y. More	India	6.90	5.90	12.80	Did not advance		
122	Vithal Karande	India	6.60	5.70	12.30	Did not advance		
123	Trilok Singh	India	6.85	5.00	11.85	Did not advance		
124	Wang Shian Ming	Taiwan	5.50	4.50	10.00	Did not advance		
125	Uih Yah Torh	Taiwan	5.05	3.75	8.80	Did not advance		
126	Mohamed Ibrahim	Egypt	8.25	—	8.25	Did not advance		
127	D. Mondal	India	7.30	—	7.30	Did not advance		
128	Liuh Reng Suhn	Taiwan	3.50	3.00	6.50	Did not advance		
—	Demetrio Pastrana	Philippines	DNS			Did not advance		
—	Fortunato Payao	Philippines	DNS			Did not advance		

== Sources ==
- Tokyo Organizing Committee (1964). The Games of the XVIII Olympiad: Tokyo 1964, vol. 2.
