= Gymnastics at the 1964 Summer Olympics – Men's horizontal bar =

Men's horizontal bar at the Games of the XVIII Olympiad
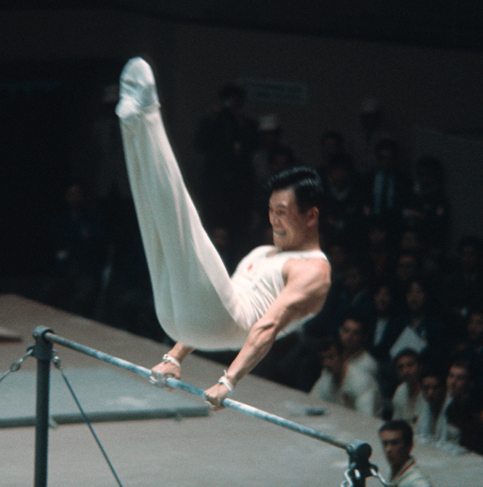
- Takashi Ono competing on the horizontal bar
- Venue: Tokyo Metropolitan Gymnasium
- Dates: 18–23 October 1964
- Competitors: 128 from 29 nations
- Winning score: 19.625

Medalists
1st place, gold medalist(s)		Boris Shakhlin; Soviet Union
2nd place, silver medalist(s)		Yuri Titov; Soviet Union
3rd place, bronze medalist(s)		Miroslav Cerar; Yugoslavia

The men's horizontal bar was a gymnastics event contested as part of the Gymnastics at the 1964 Summer Olympics programme at the Tokyo Metropolitan Gymnasium. The event was held on 18, 20, and 23 October. There were 128 competitors from 29 nations, with nations in the team competition having up to 6 gymnasts and other nations entering up to 3 gymnasts. The event was won by Boris Shakhlin of the Soviet Union, the nation's first victory in the horizontal bar after two Games with silver and bronze medals. The Soviets also took silver, with Yuri Titov finishing second. Shakhlin (bronze in 1960) and Titov (silver in 1956) were the fifth and sixth men to win multiple medals in the horizontal bar. Bronze went to Miroslav Cerar of Yugoslavia.

== Background ==
This was the 11th appearance of the event, which is one of the five apparatus events held every time there were apparatus events at the Summer Olympics (no apparatus events were held in 1900, 1908, 1912, or 1920). Five of the six finalists from 1960 returned: two-time gold medalist Takashi Ono of Japan, bronze medalist Boris Shakhlin of the Soviet Union, fourth-place finisher Yukio Endo of Japan, fifth-place finisher (and 1956 silver medalist) Yury Titov of the Soviet Union, and sixth-place finisher Miroslav Cerar of Yugoslavia. (All five would make the final again in 1964.) Ono was the reigning (1962) world champion as well, with Endo a silver medalist and Titov and Cerar finalists.

Algeria, the Republic of China, Iran, and Mongolia each made their debut in the men's parallel bars. The United States made its 10th appearance, most of any nation, having missed only the inaugural 1896 Games.

== Competition format ==
The gymnastics all-around events continued to use the aggregation format. Each nation entered a team of six gymnasts or up to two individual gymnasts. All entrants in the gymnastics competitions performed both a compulsory exercise and a voluntary exercise for each apparatus. The scores for all 12 exercises were summed to give an individual all-around score.

These exercise scores were also used for qualification for the apparatus finals. The two exercises (compulsory and voluntary) for each apparatus were summed to give an apparatus score; the top 6 in each apparatus participated in the finals; others were ranked 7th through 128th. For the apparatus finals, the all-around score for that apparatus was multiplied by one-half then added to the final round exercise score to give a final total.

Exercise scores ranged from 0 to 10, with the final total apparatus score from 0 to 20.

== Schedule ==
All times are Japan Standard Time (UTC+9)

Date	Time	Round
Sunday, 18 October 1964	8:30; 17:00	Preliminary: Compulsory
Tuesday, 20 October 1964	8:30; 17:00	Preliminary: Voluntary
Saturday, 23 October 1964	19:30	Final

== Results ==
Each gymnast competed in both compulsory and optional exercises, with the median scores from the four judges for the two sets of exercises were summed. This score was also used in calculating both individual all-around and team scores.

The top 6 advanced to the final for the apparatus, keeping half of their preliminary score to be added to their final score.

Rank	Gymnast	Nation	Preliminary			Final		
Rank	Gymnast	Nation	Compulsory	Voluntary	Total	1/2 Prelim.	Final	Total
1st place, gold medalist(s)	Boris Shakhlin	Soviet Union	9.75	9.80	19.55	9.775	9.850	19.625
2nd place, silver medalist(s)	Yuri Titov	Soviet Union	9.70	9.80	19.50	9.750	9.800	19.550
3rd place, bronze medalist(s)	Miroslav Cerar	Yugoslavia	9.55	9.75	19.30	9.650	9.850	19.500
4	Victor Lisitsky	Soviet Union	9.65	9.60	19.25	9.625	9.700	19.325
5	Yukio Endo	Japan	9.70	9.70	19.40	9.700	9.350	19.050
6	Takashi Ono	Japan	9.70	9.70	19.40	9.700	9.300	19.000
7	Rajmund Csanyi	Hungary	9.70	9.55	19.25	Did not advance		
7	Franco Menichelli	Italy	9.60	9.65	19.25	Did not advance		
7	Haruhiro Yamashita	Japan	9.65	9.60	19.25	Did not advance		
10	Victor Leontyev	Soviet Union	9.50	9.70	19.20	Did not advance		
11	Takashi Mitsukuri	Japan	9.55	9.60	19.15	Did not advance		
12	Takuji Hayata	Japan	9.60	9.50	19.10	Did not advance		
12	Mikolaj Kubica	Poland	9.50	9.60	19.10	Did not advance		
14	Wilhelm Kubica	Poland	9.55	9.50	19.05	Did not advance		
14	Nicola Prodanov	Bulgaria	9.45	9.60	19.05	Did not advance		
14	Lajos Varga	Hungary	9.50	9.55	19.05	Did not advance		
17	Yury Tsapenko	Soviet Union	9.50	9.50	19.00	Did not advance		
18	Siegfried Fulle	United Team of Germany	9.40	9.55	18.95	Did not advance		
18	Velik Kapsasov	Bulgaria	9.45	9.50	18.95	Did not advance		
18	Frederic Orendi	Romania	9.60	9.35	18.95	Did not advance		
21	Istvan Aranyos	Hungary	9.40	9.50	18.90	Did not advance		
21	Luigi Cimnaghi	Italy	9.30	9.60	18.90	Did not advance		
21	Sergey Diomidov	Soviet Union	9.60	9.30	18.90	Did not advance		
21	Klaus Köste	United Team of Germany	9.50	9.40	18.90	Did not advance		
21	Shuji Tsurumi	Japan	9.65	9.25	18.90	Did not advance		
26	Chung Yi Kwang	South Korea	9.40	9.45	18.85	Did not advance		
26	Karel Klecka	Czechoslovakia	9.40	9.45	18.85	Did not advance		
26	Makoto Sakamoto	United States	9.35	9.50	18.85	Did not advance		
29	Liuben Christov	Bulgaria	9.40	9.40	18.80	Did not advance		
29	Erwin Koppe	United Team of Germany	9.30	9.50	18.80	Did not advance		
31	Ronald Barak	United States	9.45	9.30	18.75	Did not advance		
31	Bernard Fauqueux	France	9.20	9.55	18.75	Did not advance		
31	Jan Jankowicz	Poland	9.35	9.40	18.75	Did not advance		
31	Olli Laiho	Finland	9.45	9.30	18.75	Did not advance		
31	Georgi Mirtchev	Bulgaria	9.35	9.40	18.75	Did not advance		
31	Aleksander Rokosa	Poland	9.35	9.40	18.75	Did not advance		
37	Janez Brodnik	Yugoslavia	9.40	9.30	18.70	Did not advance		
37	Christian Guiffroy	France	9.25	9.45	18.70	Did not advance		
37	Vaclav Kubicka	Czechoslovakia	9.35	9.35	18.70	Did not advance		
40	Gyozo Cser	Hungary	9.25	9.40	18.65	Did not advance		
40	Age Storhaug	Norway	9.20	9.45	18.65	Did not advance		
42	Philipp Fürst	United Team of Germany	9.20	9.40	18.60	Did not advance		
42	Kim Kwang Duk	South Korea	9.30	9.30	18.60	Did not advance		
42	Alfred Kucharczyk	Poland	9.20	9.40	18.60	Did not advance		
42	Ladislav Pazdera	Czechoslovakia	9.30	9.30	18.60	Did not advance		
46	Gheorghe Tohaneanu	Romania	9.15	9.40	18.55	Did not advance		
47	Larry Banner	United States	9.15	9.35	18.50	Did not advance		
47	Lee Kwang Jae	South Korea	9.40	9.10	18.50	Did not advance		
47	Peter Weber	United Team of Germany	9.20	9.30	18.50	Did not advance		
50	Otto Kestola	Finland	9.15	9.30	18.45	Did not advance		
50	Premysl Krbec	Czechoslovakia	9.15	9.30	18.45	Did not advance		
50	Gunter Lyhs	United Team of Germany	9.05	9.40	18.45	Did not advance		
50	Bohumil Mudrik	Czechoslovakia	9.20	9.25	18.45	Did not advance		
50	Suh Jae Kyu	South Korea	9.10	9.35	18.45	Did not advance		
55	Fritz Feuz	Switzerland	9.10	9.30	18.40	Did not advance		
55	Raimo Heinonen	Finland	9.30	9.10	18.40	Did not advance		
55	Todor Kondev	Bulgaria	9.25	9.15	18.40	Did not advance		
55	Martin Srot	Yugoslavia	9.00	9.40	18.40	Did not advance		
59	Todor Batchvarov	Bulgaria	9.10	9.25	18.35	Did not advance		
60	Anton Kadar	Romania	9.20	9.10	18.30	Did not advance		
60	Kim Choong Tai	South Korea	9.10	9.20	18.30	Did not advance		
60	Harald Wigaard	Norway	8.95	9.35	18.30	Did not advance		
63	Giovanni Carminucci	Italy	9.20	9.05	18.25	Did not advance		
63	Pasquale Carminucci	Italy	9.20	9.05	18.25	Did not advance		
63	Eugen Ekman	Finland	9.10	9.15	18.25	Did not advance		
63	Josy Stoffel	Luxembourg	8.95	9.30	18.25	Did not advance		
63	Angelo Vicardi	Italy	8.95	9.30	18.25	Did not advance		
68	Franz Fah	Switzerland	9.00	9.20	18.20	Did not advance		
68	Andrzej Konopka	Poland	8.95	9.25	18.20	Did not advance		
68	Stig Lindevall	Sweden	8.90	9.30	18.20	Did not advance		
71	Meinrad Berchtold	Switzerland	8.90	9.25	18.15	Did not advance		
71	Arthur Shurlock	United States	9.10	9.05	18.15	Did not advance		
73	Russell Mitchell	United States	9.05	9.00	18.05	Did not advance		
73	Hannu Rantakari	Finland	9.10	8.95	18.05	Did not advance		
75	Andras Lelkes	Hungary	9.10	8.90	18.00	Did not advance		
75	Alojz Petrovic	Yugoslavia	8.75	9.25	18.00	Did not advance		
77	Michel Bouchonnet	France	8.75	9.20	17.95	Did not advance		
78	Peter Sos	Hungary	8.75	9.05	17.80	Did not advance		
79	Héctor Ramírez	Cuba	8.80	8.95	17.75	Did not advance		
80	Fredy Egger	Switzerland	9.00	8.70	17.70	Did not advance		
80	Nenad Vidovic	Yugoslavia	9.30	8.40	17.70	Did not advance		
82	Gheorghe Condovici	Romania	8.40	9.25	17.65	Did not advance		
82	Gottlieb Fassler	Switzerland	8.45	9.20	17.65	Did not advance		
82	Gilbert Larose	Canada	8.65	9.00	17.65	Did not advance		
85	Ivan Caklec	Yugoslavia	8.50	9.10	17.60	Did not advance		
86	Liuh Reng Suhn	Taiwan	8.65	8.90	17.55	Did not advance		
86	Walter Muller	Switzerland	8.60	8.95	17.55	Did not advance		
86	Alexandru Szilagyi	Romania	8.55	9.00	17.55	Did not advance		
89	Kauko Heikkinen	Finland	9.00	8.45	17.45	Did not advance		
89	Kang Soo Il	South Korea	8.20	9.25	17.45	Did not advance		
91	Jan Thai San	Taiwan	8.70	8.70	17.40	Did not advance		
91	Lai Chu Long	Taiwan	8.50	8.90	17.40	Did not advance		
91	Felix Padron	Cuba	8.45	8.95	17.40	Did not advance		
94	Graham Bond	Australia	8.95	8.40	17.35	Did not advance		
94	Ady Stefanetti	Luxembourg	8.45	8.90	17.35	Did not advance		
94	William Thoresson	Sweden	8.40	8.95	17.35	Did not advance		
94	Niamdawaa Zagdbazar	Mongolia	8.60	8.75	17.35	Did not advance		
98	Barry Cheales	Australia	8.50	8.80	17.30	Did not advance		
99	Richard Kihn	Canada	8.55	8.70	17.25	Did not advance		
99	Gregor Weiss	United States	8.85	8.40	17.25	Did not advance		
101	Pablo Hernandez	Cuba	8.15	9.00	17.15	Did not advance		
102	Bruno Franceschetti	Italy	8.90	8.20	17.10	Did not advance		
102	Pavel Gajdos	Czechoslovakia	9.10	8.00	17.10	Did not advance		
102	Wang Shian Ming	Taiwan	8.35	8.75	17.10	Did not advance		
105	John Pancott	Great Britain	8.55	8.50	17.05	Did not advance		
105	Frederick Trainer	Australia	8.35	8.70	17.05	Did not advance		
105	Wilhelm Weiler	Canada	8.15	8.90	17.05	Did not advance		
108	Marcus Faulks	Australia	8.45	8.55	17.00	Did not advance		
109	Leif Koorn	Sweden	8.45	8.45	16.90	Did not advance		
110	Lee Bu Ti	Taiwan	8.05	8.75	16.80	Did not advance		
111	Andres Gonzalez	Cuba	8.40	8.30	16.70	Did not advance		
111	Mohamed Lazhari	Algeria	7.45	9.25	16.70	Did not advance		
113	Petre Miclaus	Romania	8.00	8.45	16.45	Did not advance		
114	Carlos Garcia	Cuba	8.20	7.45	15.65	Did not advance		
115	Douglas McLennon	Australia	6.90	8.40	15.30	Did not advance		
116	Jalal Bazargan	Iran	7.80	7.45	15.25	Did not advance		
117	John Mulhall	Great Britain	7.65	7.55	15.20	Did not advance		
118	Benjamin de Roo	Australia	7.20	7.95	15.15	Did not advance		
119	Octavio Suarez	Cuba	6.90	8.00	14.90	Did not advance		
120	Uih Yah Torh	Taiwan	6.85	7.60	14.45	Did not advance		
121	Vithal Karande	India	6.75	6.45	13.20	Did not advance		
122	Carlos Pizzini	Argentina	4.90	8.20	13.10	Did not advance		
123	B. Bhosle	India	5.25	6.90	12.15	Did not advance		
124	Anant Ram	India	4.50	6.05	10.55	Did not advance		
125	Mohamed Ibrahim	Egypt	7.30	—	7.30	Did not advance		
126	D. Mondal	India	7.15	—	7.15	Did not advance		
127	Y. More	India	4.50	1.75	6.25	Did not advance		
128	Trilok Singh	India	—	6.00	6.00	Did not advance		
—	Demetrio Pastrana	Philippines	DNS			Did not advance		
—	Fortunato Payao	Philippines	DNS			Did not advance		

== Sources ==
- Tokyo Organizing Committee (1964). The Games of the XVIII Olympiad: Tokyo 1964, vol. 2.
