= Gymnastics at the 1964 Summer Olympics – Men's rings =

Olympic gymnastics event

Men's rings at the Games of the XVIII Olympiad
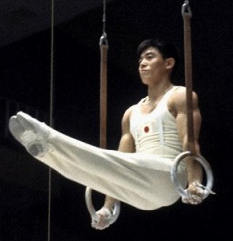
- Takuji Hayata competing on the rings
- Venue: Tokyo Metropolitan Gymnasium
- Dates: 18–22 October 1964
- Competitors: 128 from 29 nations
- Winning score: 19.475

Medalists
1st place, gold medalist(s)		Takuji Hayata; Japan
2nd place, silver medalist(s)		Franco Menichelli; Italy
3rd place, bronze medalist(s)		Boris Shakhlin; Soviet Union

The men's rings was a gymnastics event contested as part of the Gymnastics at the 1964 Summer Olympics programme at the Tokyo Metropolitan Gymnasium. The event was held on 18, 20, and 22 October. There were 128 competitors from 29 nations, with nations in the team competition having up to 6 gymnasts and other nations entering up to 3 gymnasts. The event was won by Takuji Hayata of Japan, the nation's first victory in the rings after two Games with bronze medals. Silver went to Franco Menichelli of Italy, the nation's first rings medal since 1932. Boris Shakhlin of the Soviet Union took bronze, breaking a three-Games gold medal streak for the Soviets. Shakhlin was the fourth man to win multiple medals in the rings, adding to his 1960 silver.

== Background ==
This was the 11th appearance of the event, which is one of the five apparatus events held every time there were apparatus events at the Summer Olympics (no apparatus events were held in 1900, 1908, 1912, or 1920). Four of the six finalists from 1960 returned: silver medalist Boris Shakhlin of the Soviet Union, joint bronze medalists Velik Kapsazov of Bulgaria and Takashi Ono of Japan, and sixth-place finisher Yury Titov of the Soviet Union. Two-time gold medalist Albert Azaryan had retired. Titov had won the 1962 world championship, with Shakhlin and Yukio Endo of Japan tying for second place.

Algeria, the Republic of China, Iran, and Mongolia each made their debut in the men's rings. The United States made its 10th appearance, most of any nation, having missed only the inaugural 1896 Games.

== Competition format ==
The gymnastics all-around events continued to use the aggregation format. Each nation entered a team of six gymnasts or up to two individual gymnasts. All entrants in the gymnastics competitions performed both a compulsory exercise and a voluntary exercise for each apparatus. The scores for all 12 exercises were summed to give an individual all-around score.

These exercise scores were also used for qualification for the apparatus finals. The two exercises (compulsory and voluntary) for each apparatus were summed to give an apparatus score; the top 6 in each apparatus participated in the finals; others were ranked 7th through 128th. For the apparatus finals, the all-around score for that apparatus was multiplied by one-half then added to the final round exercise score to give a final total.

Exercise scores ranged from 0 to 10, with the final total apparatus score from 0 to 20.

== Schedule ==
All times are Japan Standard Time (UTC+9)

Date	Time	Round
Sunday, 18 October 1964	8:30; 17:00	Preliminary: Compulsory
Tuesday, 20 October 1964	8:30; 17:00	Preliminary: Voluntary
Friday, 22 October 1964	18:00	Final

== Results ==
Each gymnast competed in both compulsory and optional exercises, with the median scores from the four judges for the two sets of exercises were summed. This score was also used in calculating both individual all-around and team scores.

The top 6 advanced to the final for the apparatus, keeping half of their preliminary score to be added to their final score.

Rank	Gymnast	Nation	Preliminary			Final		
Rank	Gymnast	Nation	Compulsory	Voluntary	Total	1/2 Prelim.	Final	Total
1st place, gold medalist(s)	Takuji Hayata	Japan	9.70	9.75	19.45	9.725	9.750	19.475
2nd place, silver medalist(s)	Franco Menichelli	Italy	9.65	9.80	19.45	9.725	9.700	19.425
3rd place, bronze medalist(s)	Boris Shakhlin	Soviet Union	9.70	9.70	19.40	9.700	9.700	19.400
4	Victor Leontyev	Soviet Union	9.70	9.60	19.35	9.650	9.700	19.350
5	Tsurumi Shuji	Japan	9.70	9.65	19.35	9.675	9.600	19.275
6	Yukio Endō	Japan	9.80	9.70	19.50	9.750	9.500	19.250
7	Yury Titov	Soviet Union	9.60	9.65	19.25	Did not advance		
8	Velik Kapsasov	Bulgaria	9.55	9.60	19.15	Did not advance		
9	Leif Koorn	Sweden	9.50	9.60	19.10	Did not advance		
9	Victor Lisitsky	Soviet Union	9.50	9.60	19.10	Did not advance		
9	Takashi Ono	Japan	9.55	9.55	19.10	Did not advance		
12	Miroslav Cerar	Yugoslavia	9.45	9.60	19.05	Did not advance		
12	Siegfried Fulle	United Team of Germany	9.50	9.55	19.05	Did not advance		
14	Mitsukuri Takashi	Japan	9.50	9.50	19.00	Did not advance		
14	Yury Tsapenko	Soviet Union	9.40	9.60	19.00	Did not advance		
16	Sergey Diomidov	Soviet Union	9.40	9.45	18.85	Did not advance		
16	Peter Weber	United Team of Germany	9.35	9.50	18.85	Did not advance		
18	Erwin Koppe	United Team of Germany	9.25	9.55	18.80	Did not advance		
18	Mikolaj Kubica	Poland	9.35	9.45	18.80	Did not advance		
18	Makoto Sakamoto	United States	9.40	9.40	18.80	Did not advance		
21	Premysl Krbec	Czechoslovakia	9.35	9.40	18.75	Did not advance		
21	Yamashita Haruhiro	Japan	9.35	9.40	18.75	Did not advance		
23	Ronald Barak	United States	9.25	9.45	18.70	Did not advance		
23	Vaclav Kubicka	Czechoslovakia	9.30	9.40	18.70	Did not advance		
23	Russell Mitchell	United States	9.20	9.50	18.70	Did not advance		
26	Giovanni Carminucci	Italy	9.25	9.40	18.65	Did not advance		
26	Martin Srot	Yugoslavia	9.30	9.35	18.65	Did not advance		
28	Pasquale Carminucci	Italy	9.30	9.30	18.60	Did not advance		
28	Rajmund Csanyi	Hungary	9.35	9.25	18.60	Did not advance		
28	Aleksander Rokosa	Poland	9.30	9.30	18.60	Did not advance		
31	Anton Kadar	Romania	9.25	9.30	18.55	Did not advance		
31	Stig Lindevall	Sweden	9.30	9.25	18.55	Did not advance		
31	Gunter Lyhs	United Team of Germany	9.20	9.35	18.55	Did not advance		
31	Gregor Weiss	United States	9.25	9.30	18.55	Did not advance		
35	Luigi Cimnaghi	Italy	9.20	9.30	18.50	Did not advance		
35	Philipp Furst	United Team of Germany	9.15	9.35	18.50	Did not advance		
35	Alfred Kucharczyk	Poland	9.25	9.25	18.50	Did not advance		
38	Bruno Franceschetti	Italy	9.20	9.25	18.45	Did not advance		
38	Nicola Prodanov	Bulgaria	9.15	9.30	18.45	Did not advance		
38	Ady Stefanetti	Luxembourg	9.05	9.40	18.45	Did not advance		
41	Ladislav Pazdera	Czechoslovakia	9.10	9.30	18.40	Did not advance		
42	Pavel Gajdos	Czechoslovakia	9.00	9.35	18.35	Did not advance		
42	Wilhelm Kubica	Poland	9.10	9.25	18.35	Did not advance		
42	Olli Laiho	Finland	9.05	9.30	18.35	Did not advance		
42	Alojz Petrovic	Yugoslavia	9.10	9.25	18.35	Did not advance		
46	Jan Jankowicz	Poland	9.20	9.10	18.30	Did not advance		
46	Arthur Shurlock	United States	9.20	9.10	18.30	Did not advance		
46	Lajos Varga	Hungary	9.05	9.25	18.30	Did not advance		
49	Istvan Aranyos	Hungary	9.10	9.15	18.25	Did not advance		
49	Kang Soo Il	South Korea	9.20	9.05	18.25	Did not advance		
49	Klaus Koste	United Team of Germany	8.85	9.40	18.25	Did not advance		
49	Bohumil Mudrik	Czechoslovakia	9.10	9.15	18.25	Did not advance		
49	Peter Sos	Hungary	9.10	9.15	18.25	Did not advance		
54	Gyozo Cser	Hungary	9.10	9.10	18.20	Did not advance		
54	Andrzej Konopka	Poland	9.10	9.10	18.20	Did not advance		
56	Gheorghe Tohaneanu	Romania	8.95	9.15	18.10	Did not advance		
57	Larry Banner	United States	8.95	9.10	18.05	Did not advance		
57	Janez Brodnik	Yugoslavia	8.90	9.15	18.05	Did not advance		
57	Kim Kwang Duk	South Korea	9.00	9.05	18.05	Did not advance		
60	Mohamed Lazhari	Algeria	8.95	9.05	18.00	Did not advance		
60	Georgi Mirtchev	Bulgaria	8.90	9.10	18.00	Did not advance		
62	Karel Klecka	Czechoslovakia	8.95	9.00	17.95	Did not advance		
62	Alexandru Szilagyi	Romania	8.85	9.10	17.95	Did not advance		
62	William Thoresson	Sweden	9.00	8.95	17.95	Did not advance		
65	Todor Kondev	Bulgaria	8.95	8.95	17.90	Did not advance		
65	Frederic Orendi	Romania	8.85	9.05	17.90	Did not advance		
65	Josy Stoffel	Luxembourg	8.85	9.05	17.90	Did not advance		
65	Age Storhaug	Norway	8.80	9.10	17.90	Did not advance		
69	Eugen Ekman	Finland	8.65	9.20	17.85	Did not advance		
69	Raimo Heinonen	Finland	9.00	8.85	17.85	Did not advance		
71	Todor Batchvarov	Bulgaria	8.70	9.10	17.80	Did not advance		
71	Kauko Heikkinen	Finland	8.85	8.95	17.80	Did not advance		
71	Gilbert Larose	Canada	8.75	9.05	17.80	Did not advance		
74	Liuben Christov	Bulgaria	8.85	8.90	17.75	Did not advance		
74	Chung Yi Kwang	South Korea	8.60	9.15	17.75	Did not advance		
74	Petre Miclaus	Romania	8.55	9.20	17.75	Did not advance		
77	Suh Jae Kyu	South Korea	9.00	8.70	17.70	Did not advance		
78	Andras Lelkes	Hungary	8.80	8.85	17.65	Did not advance		
79	Hannu Rantakari	Finland	8.80	8.80	17.60	Did not advance		
80	Kim Choong Tai	South Korea	8.95	8.60	17.55	Did not advance		
81	Ivan Caklec	Yugoslavia	8.70	8.80	17.50	Did not advance		
81	Christian Guiffroy	France	8.55	8.95	17.50	Did not advance		
81	Otto Kestola	Finland	8.55	8.95	17.50	Did not advance		
81	Walter Muller	Switzerland	8.60	8.90	17.50	Did not advance		
81	Octavio Suarez	Cuba	8.75	8.75	17.50	Did not advance		
81	Angelo Vicardi	Italy	8.55	8.95	17.50	Did not advance		
87	Harald Wigaard	Norway	8.35	9.10	17.45	Did not advance		
88	Wilhelm Weiler	Canada	8.40	9.00	17.40	Did not advance		
89	Gheorghe Condovici	Romania	8.60	8.75	17.35	Did not advance		
89	Carlos Garcia	Cuba	8.45	8.90	17.35	Did not advance		
91	Gottlieb Fassler	Switzerland	8.50	8.70	17.20	Did not advance		
91	Fritz Feuz	Switzerland	8.55	8.65	17.20	Did not advance		
91	John Pancott	Great Britain	9.00	8.20	17.20	Did not advance		
94	Richard Kihn	Canada	8.46	8.65	17.10	Did not advance		
94	Lee Kwang Jae	South Korea	8.90	8.20	17.10	Did not advance		
94	Uih Yah Torh	Taiwan	8.75	8.35	17.10	Did not advance		
97	Bernard Fauqueux	France	8.90	8.15	17.05	Did not advance		
98	Fredy Egger	Switzerland	8.40	8.60	17.00	Did not advance		
98	Niamdawaa Zagdbazar	Mongolia	8.25	8.75	17.00	Did not advance		
100	Nenad Vidovic	Yugoslavia	8.00	8.90	16.90	Did not advance		
101	Andres Gonzalez	Cuba	8.40	8.40	16.80'	Did not advance		
101	Lee Bu Ti	Taiwan	8.35	8.45	16.80	Did not advance		
103	Michel Bouchonnet	France	8.30	8.45	16.75	Did not advance		
103	Jan Thai San	Taiwan	8.70	8.05	16.75	Did not advance		
105	Meinrad Berchtold	Switzerland	8.10	8.60	16.70	Did not advance		
106	Pablo Hernandez	Cuba	8.00	8.55	16.55	Did not advance		
107	John Mulhall	Great Britain	8.10	8.30	16.40	Did not advance		
108	Douglas McLennon	Australia	8.00	8.35	16.35	Did not advance		
108	Felix Padron	Cuba	7.85	8.50	16.35	Did not advance		
110	Franz Fah	Switzerland	7.50	8.25	16.25	Did not advance		
111	Carlos Pizzini	Argentina	7.85	8.35	16.20	Did not advance		
111	Benjamin de Roo	Australia	8.25	7.95	16.20	Did not advance		
111	Wang Shian Ming	Taiwan	7.80	8.40	16.20	Did not advance		
114	Graham Bond	Australia	7.60	8.45	16.05	Did not advance		
115	Héctor Ramírez	Cuba	7.40	8.50	15.90	Did not advance		
116	Jalal Bazargan	Iran	7.30	8.50	15.80	Did not advance		
117	Marcus Faulks	Australia	7.35	7.90	15.25	Did not advance		
118	Liuh Reng Suhn	Taiwan	7.00	7.90	14.90	Did not advance		
119	Frederick Trainer	Australia	6.50	8.10	14.60	Did not advance		
120	Lai Chu Long	Taiwan	7.00	7.55	14.55	Did not advance		
121	Barry Cheales	Australia	7.50	7.00	14.50	Did not advance		
122	Vithal Karande	India	6.65	7.30	13.95	Did not advance		
123	Y. More	India	6.00	7.70	13.70	Did not advance		
124	Trilok Singh	India	6.00	7.50	13.50	Did not advance		
125	B. Bhosle	India	6.50	6.50	13.00	Did not advance		
126	Anant Ram	India	4.70	7.45	12.15	Did not advance		
127	Mohamed Ibrahim	Egypt	8.70	—	8.70	Did not advance		
128	D. Mondal	India	6.65	—	6.65	Did not advance		
—	Demetrio Pastrana	Philippines	DNS			Did not advance		
—	Fortunato Payao	Philippines	DNS			Did not advance		

== Sources ==
- Tokyo Organizing Committee (1964). The Games of the XVIII Olympiad: Tokyo 1964, vol. 2.
