= Gymnastics at the 1964 Summer Olympics – Men's vault =

Olympic gymnastics event

Men's vault at the Games of the XVIII Olympiad
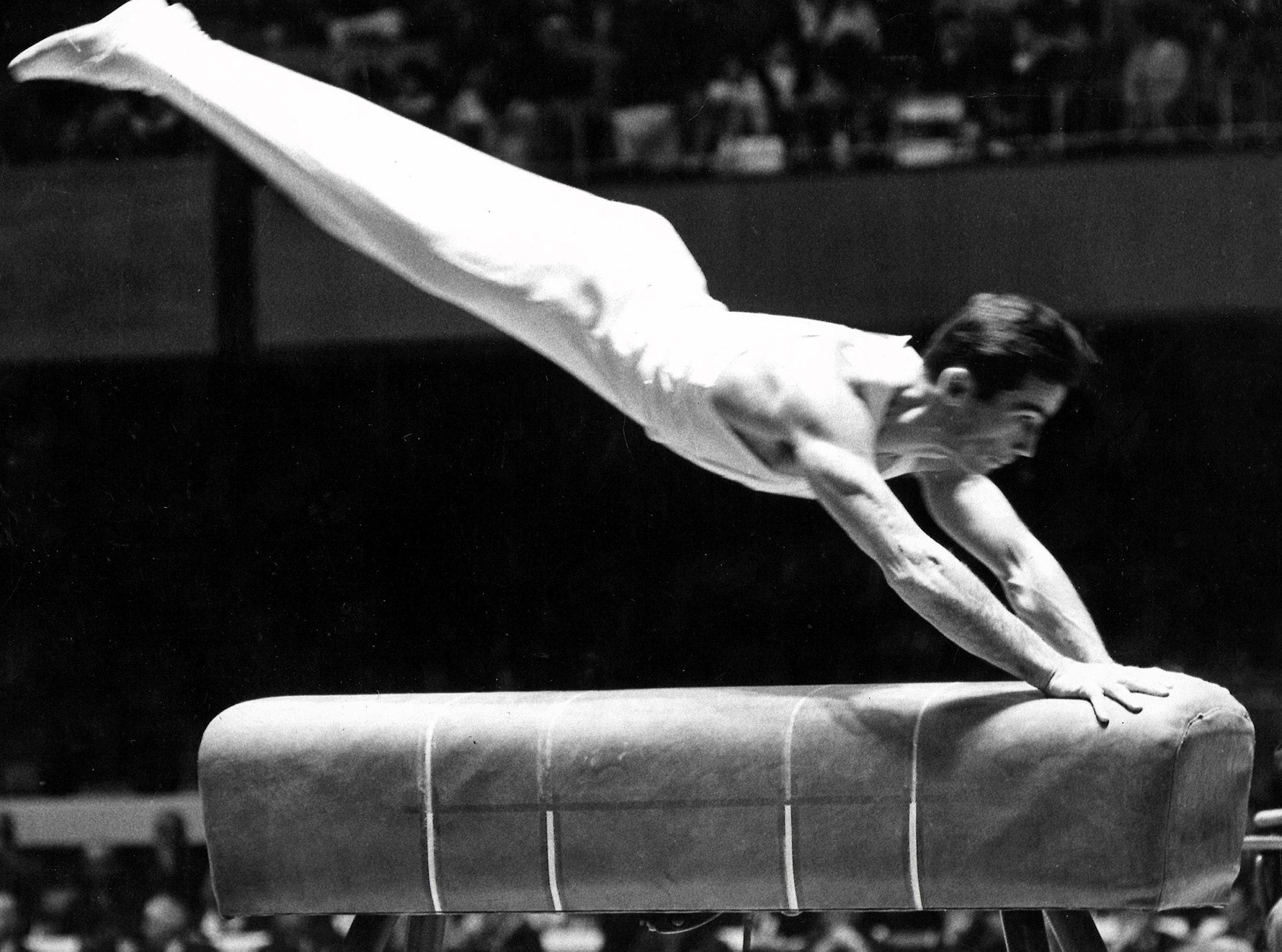
- Hannu Rantakari competing on the vault
- Venue: Tokyo Metropolitan Gymnasium
- Dates: 18–23 October 1964
- Competitors: 130 from 30 nations
- Winning score: 19.600

Medalists
| 1st place, gold medalist(s) | | Haruhiro Yamashita | Japan |
| 2nd place, silver medalist(s) | | Victor Lisitsky | Soviet Union |
| 3rd place, bronze medalist(s) | | Hannu Rantakari | Finland |

The men's vault was a gymnastics event contested as part of the Gymnastics at the 1964 Summer Olympics programme at the Tokyo Metropolitan Gymnasium. The event was held on 18, 20, and 23 October. There were 130 competitors from 30 nations, with nations in the team competition having up to 6 gymnasts and other nations entering up to 3 gymnasts. For the first time in three Games, there was a clear winner with no tie. Haruhiro Yamashita took the gold medal, the second consecutive gold for Japan. Victor Lisitsky finished second, taking silver but breaking the Soviet Union's three-Games gold medal streak. Hannu Rantakari's bronze was Finland's first medal in the event since 1948.

== Background ==
This was the 11th appearance of the event, which is one of the five apparatus events held every time there were apparatus events at the Summer Olympics (no apparatus events were held in 1900, 1908, 1912, or 1920). Seven of the top 11 (including three-way tie for 9th) gymnasts from 1960 returned: joint gold medalists Takashi Ono of Japan and Boris Shakhlin of the Soviet Union, fourth-place finisher Yury Titov of the Soviet Union, fifth-place finisher Yukio Endo, sixth-place finisher Shuji Tsurumi, and eighth-place finisher Takashi Mitsukuri of Japan, and ninth-place finishers Franco Menichelli and Giovanni Carminucci of Italy. Ono had also taken bronze in 1952, Titov had taken bronze in 1956, and Shakhlin had finished fourth in 1956. The reigning (1962) world champion was Přemysl Krbec of Czechoslovakia, with Haruhiro Yamashita of Japan second and Endo and Shakhlin tied for third.

Algeria, the Republic of China, Iran, Mongolia, and the Philippines each made their debut in the men's vault. The United States made its 10th appearance, most of any nation, having missed only the inaugural 1896 Games.

== Competition format ==
The gymnastics all-around events continued to use the aggregation format. Each nation entered a team of six gymnasts or up to two individual gymnasts. All entrants in the gymnastics competitions performed both a compulsory exercise and a voluntary exercise for each apparatus. The scores for all 12 exercises were summed to give an individual all-around score. The event used a "vaulting horse" aligned parallel to the gymnast's run (rather than the modern "vaulting table" in use since 2004).

These exercise scores were also used for qualification for the apparatus finals. The two exercises (compulsory and voluntary) for each apparatus were summed to give an apparatus score; the top 6 in each apparatus participated in the finals; others were ranked 7th through 130th. For the apparatus finals, the all-around score for that apparatus was multiplied by one-half then added to the final round exercise score to give a final total.

Exercise scores ranged from 0 to 10, with the final total apparatus score from 0 to 20.

== Schedule ==
All times are Japan Standard Time (UTC+9)

| Date | Time | Round |
|---|---|---|
| Sunday, 18 October 1964 | 8:30; 17:00 | Preliminary: Compulsory |
| Tuesday, 20 October 1964 | 8:30; 17:00 | Preliminary: Voluntary |
| Friday, 23 October 1964 | 19:30 | Final |

== Results ==
Each gymnast competed in both compulsory and optional exercises, with the median scores from the four judges for the two sets of exercises were summed. This score was also used in calculating both individual all-around and team scores.

The top 6 advanced to the final for the apparatus, keeping half of their preliminary score to be added to their final score.

| Rank | Gymnast | Nation | Preliminary | | | Final | | |
| Rank | Gymnast | Nation | Compulsory | Voluntary | Total | 1/2 Prelim. | Final | Total |
|---|---|---|---|---|---|---|---|---|
| 1st place, gold medalist(s) | Haruhiro Yamashita | Japan | 9.70 | 9.80 | 19.50 | 9.750 | 9.850 | 19.600 |
| 2nd place, silver medalist(s) | Victor Lisitsky | Soviet Union | 9.75 | 9.75 | 19.50 | 9.750 | 9.575 | 19.325 |
| 3rd place, bronze medalist(s) | Hannu Rantakari | Finland | 9.65 | 9.70 | 19.35 | 9.675 | 9.625 | 19.300 |
| 4 | Shuji Tsurumi | Japan | 9.65 | 9.65 | 19.30 | 9.650 | 9.575 | 19.225 |
| 5 | Boris Shakhlin | Soviet Union | 9.65 | 9.70 | 19.35 | 9.675 | 9.525 | 19.200 |
| 6 | Yukio Endo | Japan | 9.75 | 9.65 | 19.40 | 9.700 | 9.375 | 19.075 |
| 7 | Siegfried Fulle | United Team of Germany | 9.65 | 9.65 | 19.30 | Did not advance | | |
| 7 | Alfred Kucharczyk | Poland | 9.60 | 9.70 | 19.30 | Did not advance | | |
| 9 | Sergey Diomidov | Soviet Union | 9.60 | 9.65 | 19.25 | Did not advance | | |
| 9 | Yury Titov | Soviet Union | 9.65 | 9.60 | 19.25 | Did not advance | | |
| 9 | Premysl Krbec | Czechoslovakia | 9.55 | 9.70 | 19.25 | Did not advance | | |
| 9 | Walter Muller | Switzerland | 9.55 | 9.70 | 19.25 | Did not advance | | |
| 9 | Nicola Prodanov | Bulgaria | 9.55 | 9.70 | 19.25 | Did not advance | | |
| 14 | Takashi Ono | Japan | 9.65 | 9.55 | 19.20 | Did not advance | | |
| 14 | Wilhelm Weiler | Canada | 9.50 | 9.70 | 19.20 | Did not advance | | |
| 16 | Fritz Feuz | Switzerland | 9.50 | 9.65 | 19.15 | Did not advance | | |
| 16 | Takuji Hayata | Japan | 9.45 | 9.70 | 19.15 | Did not advance | | |
| 16 | Gunter Lyhs | United Team of Germany | 9.55 | 9.65 | 19.15 | Did not advance | | |
| 19 | Miroslav Cerar | Yugoslavia | 9.50 | 9.60 | 19.10 | Did not advance | | |
| 19 | Rajmund Csanyi | Hungary | 9.55 | 9.55 | 19.10 | Did not advance | | |
| 19 | Raimo Heinonen | Finland | 9.40 | 9.70 | 19.10 | Did not advance | | |
| 19 | Klaus Koste | United Team of Germany | 9.40 | 9.75 | 19.10 | Did not advance | | |
| 19 | Mikolaj Kubica | Poland | 9.55 | 9.55 | 19.10 | Did not advance | | |
| 24 | Fredy Egger | Switzerland | 9.45 | 9.60 | 19.05 | Did not advance | | |
| 24 | Franco Menichelli | Italy | 9.35 | 9.70 | 19.05 | Did not advance | | |
| 24 | Mitsukuri Takashi | Japan | 9.50 | 9.55 | 19.05 | Did not advance | | |
| 24 | Yury Tsapenko | Soviet Union | 9.50 | 9.55 | 19.05 | Did not advance | | |
| 28 | Age Storhaug | Norway | 9.45 | 9.55 | 19.00 | Did not advance | | |
| 28 | Peter Weber | United Team of Germany | 9.45 | 9.55 | 19.00 | Did not advance | | |
| 30 | Istvan Aranyos | Hungary | 9.50 | 9.45 | 18.95 | Did not advance | | |
| 30 | Philipp Furst | United Team of Germany | 9.40 | 9.55 | 18.95 | Did not advance | | |
| 30 | Victor Leontyev | Soviet Union | 9.40 | 9.55 | 18.95 | Did not advance | | |
| 30 | Bohumil Mudrik | Czechoslovakia | 9.35 | 9.60 | 18.95 | Did not advance | | |
| 30 | Makoto Sakamoto | United States | 9.45 | 9.50 | 18.95 | Did not advance | | |
| 30 | Peter Sos | Hungary | 9.45 | 9.50 | 18.95 | Did not advance | | |
| 36 | Meinrad Berchtold | Switzerland | 9.40 | 9.50 | 18.90 | Did not advance | | |
| 36 | Vaclav Kubicka | Czechoslovakia | 9.40 | 9.50 | 18.90 | Did not advance | | |
| 36 | Andras Lelkes | Hungary | 9.40 | 9.50 | 18.90 | Did not advance | | |
| 36 | Georgi Mirtchev | Bulgaria | 9.40 | 9.50 | 18.90 | Did not advance | | |
| 36 | Russell Mitchell | United States | 9.25 | 9.65 | 18.90 | Did not advance | | |
| 36 | Frederic Orendi | Romania | 9.40 | 9.50 | 18.90 | Did not advance | | |
| 42 | Eugen Ekman | Finland | 9.35 | 9.50 | 18.85 | Did not advance | | |
| 42 | Gottlieb Fassler | Switzerland | 9.40 | 9.45 | 18.85 | Did not advance | | |
| 42 | Olli Laiho | Finland | 9.45 | 9.40 | 18.85 | Did not advance | | |
| 42 | John Mulhall | Great Britain | 9.45 | 9.40 | 18.85 | Did not advance | | |
| 42 | Aleksander Rokosa | Poland | 9.45 | 9.40 | 18.85 | Did not advance | | |
| 42 | Gheorghe Tohaneanu | Romania | 9.35 | 9.50 | 18.85 | Did not advance | | |
| 48 | Pavel Gajdos | Czechoslovakia | 9.35 | 9.45 | 18.80 | Did not advance | | |
| 48 | Velik Kapsasov | Bulgaria | 9.30 | 9.50 | 18.80 | Did not advance | | |
| 48 | Alojz Petrovic | Yugoslavia | 9.35 | 9.45 | 18.80 | Did not advance | | |
| 48 | Arthur Shurlock | United States | 9.35 | 9.45 | 18.80 | Did not advance | | |
| 48 | Alexandru Szilagyi | Romania | 9.20 | 9.60 | 18.80 | Did not advance | | |
| 48 | Gregor Weiss | United States | 9.30 | 9.50 | 18.80 | Did not advance | | |
| 54 | Larry Banner | United States | 9.30 | 9.45 | 18.75 | Did not advance | | |
| 54 | Michel Bouchonnet | France | 9.25 | 9.50 | 18.75 | Did not advance | | |
| 54 | Ivan Caklec | Yugoslavia | 9.35 | 9.40 | 18.75 | Did not advance | | |
| 54 | Giovanni Carminucci | Italy | 9.25 | 9.50 | 18.75 | Did not advance | | |
| 54 | Liuben Christov | Bulgaria | 9.40 | 9.35 | 18.75 | Did not advance | | |
| 54 | Luigi Cimnaghi | Italy | 9.25 | 9.50 | 18.75 | Did not advance | | |
| 54 | Anton Kadar | Romania | 9.30 | 9.45 | 18.75 | Did not advance | | |
| 54 | Karel Klecka | Czechoslovakia | 9.20 | 9.55 | 18.75 | Did not advance | | |
| 54 | Erwin Koppe | United Team of Germany | 9.40 | 9.35 | 18.75 | Did not advance | | |
| 54 | Wilhelm Kubica | Poland | 9.50 | 9.25 | 18.75 | Did not advance | | |
| 54 | Gilbert Larose | Canada | 9.25 | 9.50 | 18.75 | Did not advance | | |
| 54 | Martin Srot | Yugoslavia | 9.35 | 9.40 | 18.75 | Did not advance | | |
| 54 | Josy Stoffel | Luxembourg | 9.30 | 9.45 | 18.75 | Did not advance | | |
| 54 | William Thoresson | Sweden | 9.30 | 9.45 | 18.75 | Did not advance | | |
| 54 | Harald Wigaard | Norway | 9.30 | 9.45 | 18.75 | Did not advance | | |
| 69 | Todor Batchvarov | Bulgaria | 9.30 | 9.40 | 18.70 | Did not advance | | |
| 69 | Pasquale Carminucci | Italy | 9.30 | 9.40 | 18.70 | Did not advance | | |
| 69 | Bernard Fauqueux | France | 9.30 | 9.40 | 18.70 | Did not advance | | |
| 69 | Otto Kestola | Finland | 9.30 | 9.40 | 18.70 | Did not advance | | |
| 69 | Lee Kwang Jae | South Korea | 9.30 | 9.40 | 18.70 | Did not advance | | |
| 69 | Stig Lindevall | Sweden | 9.25 | 9.45 | 18.70 | Did not advance | | |
| 69 | Petre Miclaus | Romania | 9.30 | 9.40 | 18.70 | Did not advance | | |
| 69 | Niamdawaa Zagdbazar | Mongolia | 9.25 | 9.45 | 18.70 | Did not advance | | |
| 77 | Franz Fah | Switzerland | 9.20 | 9.45 | 18.65 | Did not advance | | |
| 77 | Andres Gonzalez | Cuba | 9.30 | 9.35 | 18.65 | Did not advance | | |
| 77 | Kang Soo Il | South Korea | 9.10 | 9.55 | 18.65 | Did not advance | | |
| 77 | Richard Kihn | Canada | 9.20 | 9.45 | 18.65 | Did not advance | | |
| 77 | Leif Koorn | Sweden | 9.30 | 9.35 | 18.65 | Did not advance | | |
| 77 | Mohamed Lazhari | Algeria | 9.30 | 9.35 | 18.65 | Did not advance | | |
| 77 | Angelo Vicardi | Italy | 9.25 | 9.40 | 18.65 | Did not advance | | |
| 84 | Jan Jankowicz | Poland | 9.30 | 9.30 | 18.60 | Did not advance | | |
| 84 | Octavio Suarez | Cuba | 9.25 | 9.35 | 18.60 | Did not advance | | |
| 86 | Bruno Franceschetti | Italy | 9.15 | 9.40 | 18.55 | Did not advance | | |
| 86 | Christian Guiffroy | France | 9.25 | 9.30 | 18.55 | Did not advance | | |
| 86 | Héctor Ramírez | Cuba | 9.25 | 9.30 | 18.55 | Did not advance | | |
| 86 | Benjamin de Roo | Australia | 9.30 | 9.25 | 18.55 | Did not advance | | |
| 90 | Gheorghe Condovici | Romania | 9.15 | 9.35 | 18.50 | Did not advance | | |
| 90 | Kim Choong Tai | South Korea | 9.25 | 9.25 | 18.50 | Did not advance | | |
| 90 | Todor Kondev | Bulgaria | 9.30 | 9.20 | 18.50 | Did not advance | | |
| 90 | John Pancott | Great Britain | 9.20 | 9.30 | 18.50 | Did not advance | | |
| 90 | Carlos Pizzini | Argentina | 9.20 | 9.30 | 18.50 | Did not advance | | |
| 95 | Ronald Barak | United States | 9.15 | 9.30 | 18.45 | Did not advance | | |
| 95 | Janez Brodnik | Yugoslavia | 9.15 | 9.30 | 18.45 | Did not advance | | |
| 95 | Kauko Heikkinen | Finland | 9.10 | 9.35 | 18.45 | Did not advance | | |
| 95 | Andrzej Konopka | Poland | 9.20 | 9.25 | 18.45 | Did not advance | | |
| 95 | Suh Jae Kyu | South Korea | 9.00 | 9.45 | 18.45 | Did not advance | | |
| 100 | Ladislav Pazdera | Czechoslovakia | 9.10 | 9.30 | 18.40 | Did not advance | | |
| 100 | Frederick Trainer | Australia | 9.05 | 9.35 | 18.40 | Did not advance | | |
| 100 | Lajos Varga | Hungary | 9.15 | 9.25 | 18.40 | Did not advance | | |
| 103 | Jalal Bazargan | Iran | 9.05 | 9.30 | 18.35 | Did not advance | | |
| 103 | Graham Bond | Australia | 9.30 | 9.05 | 18.35 | Did not advance | | |
| 105 | Gyozo Cser | Hungary | 9.00 | 9.30 | 18.30 | Did not advance | | |
| 106 | Barry Cheales | Australia | 9.15 | 9.10 | 18.25 | Did not advance | | |
| 106 | Chung Yi Kwang | South Korea | 9.30 | 8.95 | 18.25 | Did not advance | | |
| 106 | Kim Kwang Duk | South Korea | 8.90 | 9.35 | 18.25 | Did not advance | | |
| 109 | Jan Thai San | Taiwan | 9.25 | 8.90 | 18.15 | Did not advance | | |
| 109 | Felix Padron | Cuba | 9.05 | 9.10 | 18.15 | Did not advance | | |
| 109 | Nenad Vidovic | Yugoslavia | 8.85 | 9.30 | 18.15 | Did not advance | | |
| 112 | Lai Chu Long | Taiwan | 9.00 | 9.10 | 18.10 | Did not advance | | |
| 113 | Ady Stefanetti | Luxembourg | 8.85 | 9.20 | 18.05 | Did not advance | | |
| 114 | D. Mondal | India | 8.90 | 9.00 | 17.90 | Did not advance | | |
| 114 | Wang Shian Ming | Taiwan | 9.00 | 8.90 | 17.90 | Did not advance | | |
| 116 | Carlos Garcia | Cuba | 8.65 | 9.20 | 17.85 | Did not advance | | |
| 116 | Pablo Hernandez | Cuba | 9.10 | 8.75 | 17.85 | Did not advance | | |
| 116 | Douglas McLennon | Australia | 8.95 | 8.90 | 17.85 | Did not advance | | |
| 119 | Trilok Singh | India | 8.70 | 9.10 | 17.80 | Did not advance | | |
| 120 | Marcus Faulks | Australia | 9.25 | 8.45 | 17.70 | Did not advance | | |
| 121 | Liuh Reng Suhn | Taiwan | 8.95 | 8.70 | 17.65 | Did not advance | | |
| 122 | Uih Yah Torh | Taiwan | 8.55 | 9.00 | 17.55 | Did not advance | | |
| 123 | Lee Bu Ti | Taiwan | 9.20 | 8.10 | 17.30 | Did not advance | | |
| 124 | Vithal Karande | India | 8.80 | 8.40 | 17.20 | Did not advance | | |
| 125 | Y. More | India | 8.65 | 8.50 | 17.15 | Did not advance | | |
| 126 | B. Bhosle | India | 7.90 | 8.75 | 16.65 | Did not advance | | |
| 127 | Mohamed Ibrahim | Egypt | 9.20 | — | 9.20 | Did not advance | | |
| 128 | Fortunato Payao | Philippines | 7.50 | — | 7.50 | Did not advance | | |
| 129 | Demetrio Pastrana | Philippines | 5.00 | — | 5.00 | Did not advance | | |
| 130 | Anand Ram | India | — | — | 0.00 | Did not advance | | |

== Sources ==
- Tokyo Organizing Committee (1964). The Games of the XVIII Olympiad: Tokyo 1964, vol. 2.
