= Gymnastics at the 1964 Summer Olympics – Men's parallel bars =

Olympic gymnastics event

Men's parallel bars at the Games of the XVIII Olympiad
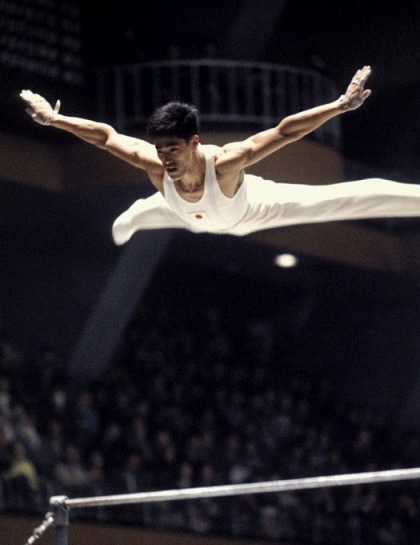
- Yukio Endo (on the horizontal bar)
- Venue: Tokyo Metropolitan Gymnasium
- Dates: 18–23 October 1964
- Competitors: 128 from 29 nations
- Winning score: 19.675

Medalists
1st place, gold medalist(s)		Yukio Endo; Japan
2nd place, silver medalist(s)		Shuji Tsurumi; Japan
3rd place, bronze medalist(s)		Franco Menichelli; Italy

The men's parallel bars was a gymnastics event contested as part of the Gymnastics at the 1964 Summer Olympics programme at the Tokyo Metropolitan Gymnasium. The event was held on 18, 20, and 23 October. There were 128 competitors from 29 nations, with nations in the team competition having up to 6 gymnasts and other nations entering up to 3 gymnasts. The event was won by Yukio Endo of Japan, the nation's first victory in the parallel bars after two Games with silver and bronze medals. It was the first of a four-Games gold medal streak for Japanese gymnasts in the event. Japan also took silver, with Shuji Tsurumi finishing second. Bronze went to Franco Menichelli of Italy.

== Background ==
This was the 11th appearance of the event, which is one of the five apparatus events held every time there were apparatus events at the Summer Olympics (no apparatus events were held in 1900, 1908, 1912, or 1920). Four of the six finalists from 1960 returned: gold medalist Boris Shakhlin of the Soviet Union, silver medalist Giovanni Carminucci of Italy, two-time bronze medalist Takashi Ono of Japan, and fifth-place finisher Yury Titov of the Soviet Union. Miroslav Cerar of Yugoslavia, who had placed eighth at the 1960 Games, was the reigning (1962) world champion; Shakhlin had come second and Yukio Endo (seventh at Rome 1960) third.

Algeria, the Republic of China, Iran, and Mongolia each made their debut in the men's parallel bars. The United States made its 10th appearance, most of any nation, having missed only the inaugural 1896 Games.

== Competition format ==
The gymnastics all-around events continued to use the aggregation format. Each nation entered a team of six gymnasts or up to two individual gymnasts. All entrants in the gymnastics competitions performed both a compulsory exercise and a voluntary exercise for each apparatus. The scores for all 12 exercises were summed to give an individual all-around score.

These exercise scores were also used for qualification for the apparatus finals. The two exercises (compulsory and voluntary) for each apparatus were summed to give an apparatus score; the top 6 in each apparatus participated in the finals; others were ranked 7th through 128th. For the apparatus finals, the all-around score for that apparatus was multiplied by one-half then added to the final round exercise score to give a final total.

Exercise scores ranged from 0 to 10, with the final total apparatus score from 0 to 20.

== Schedule ==
All times are Japan Standard Time (UTC+9)

Date	Time	Round
Sunday, 18 October 1964	8:30; 17:00	Preliminary: Compulsory
Tuesday, 20 October 1964	8:30; 17:00	Preliminary: Voluntary
Friday, 23 October 1964	19:30	Final

== Results ==
Each gymnast competed in both compulsory and optional exercises, with the median scores from the four judges for the two sets of exercises were summed. This score was also used in calculating both individual all-around and team scores.

The top 6 advanced to the final for the apparatus, keeping half of their preliminary score to be added to their final score.

Rank	Gymnast	Nation	Preliminary			Final		
Rank	Gymnast	Nation	Compulsory	Voluntary	Total	1/2 Prelim.	Final	Total
1st place, gold medalist(s)	Yukio Endo	Japan	9.80	9.75	19.55	9.775	9.900	19.675
2nd place, silver medalist(s)	Shuji Tsurumi	Japan	9.75	9.75	19.50	9.750	9.700	19.450
3rd place, bronze medalist(s)	Franco Menichelli	Italy	9.70	9.60	19.30	9.650	9.700	19.350
4	Sergey Diomidov	Soviet Union	9.65	9.70	19.35	9.675	9.550	19.225
5	Victor Lisitsky	Soviet Union	9.80	9.70	19.50	9.750	9.450	19.200
6	Miroslav Cerar	Yugoslavia	9.70	9.80	19.50	9.750	8.700	18.450
7	Giovanni Carminucci	Italy	9.65	9.65	19.30	Did not advance		
7	Yamashita Haruhiro	Japan	9.65	9.65	19.30	Did not advance		
9	Boris Shakhlin	Soviet Union	9.60	9.65	19.25	Did not advance		
10	Christian Guiffroy	France	9.60	9.55	19.15	Did not advance		
10	Takuji Hayata	Japan	9.45	9.70	19.15	Did not advance		
10	Victor Leontyev	Soviet Union	9.60	9.55	19.15	Did not advance		
13	Mitsukuri Takashi	Japan	9.60	9.50	19.10	Did not advance		
14	Luigi Cimnaghi	Italy	9.45	9.60	19.05	Did not advance		
14	Erwin Koppe	United Team of Germany	9.50	9.55	19.05	Did not advance		
14	Yury Titov	Soviet Union	9.60	9.45	19.05	Did not advance		
14	Yury Tsapenko	Soviet Union	9.60	9.45	19.05	Did not advance		
18	Rajmund Csanyi	Hungary	9.50	9.50	19.00	Did not advance		
18	Siegfried Fulle	United Team of Germany	9.50	9.50	19.00	Did not advance		
18	Klaus Koste	United Team of Germany	9.40	9.60	19.00	Did not advance		
18	Stig Lindevall	Sweden	9.50	9.50	19.00	Did not advance		
22	Pavel Gajdos	Czechoslovakia	9.40	9.55	18.95	Did not advance		
22	Kim Choong Tai	South Korea	9.40	9.55	18.95	Did not advance		
22	Walter Muller	Switzerland	9.45	9.50	18.95	Did not advance		
25	Philipp Furst	United Team of Germany	9.40	9.50	18.90	Did not advance		
25	Takashi Ono	Japan	9.60	9.30	18.90	Did not advance		
25	Makoto Sakamoto	United States	9.40	9.50	18.90	Did not advance		
28	Olli Laiho	Finland	9.35	9.50	18.85	Did not advance		
28	Josy Stoffel	Luxembourg	9.35	9.50	18.85	Did not advance		
30	Eugen Ekman	Finland	9.30	9.50	18.80	Did not advance		
30	Jan Jankowicz	Poland	9.45	9.35	18.80	Did not advance		
30	Anton Kadar	Romania	9.30	9.50	18.80	Did not advance		
30	Kim Kwang Duk	South Korea	9.45	9.35	18.80	Did not advance		
30	Gunter Lyhs	United Team of Germany	9.40	9.40	18.80	Did not advance		
30	Bohumil Mudrik	Czechoslovakia	9.40	9.40	18.80	Did not advance		
30	Frederic Orendi	Romania	9.40	9.40	18.80	Did not advance		
30	Ladislav Pazdera	Czechoslovakia	9.30	9.50	18.80	Did not advance		
30	Aleksander Rokosa	Poland	9.35	9.45	18.80	Did not advance		
30	Gregor Weiss	United States	9.30	9.50	18.80	Did not advance		
40	Peter Weber	United Team of Germany	9.40	9.35	18.75	Did not advance		
41	Chung Yi Kwang	South Korea	9.30	9.40	18.70	Did not advance		
41	Premysl Krbec	Czechoslovakia	9.30	9.40	18.70	Did not advance		
41	Mikolaj Kubica	Poland	9.60	9.10	18.70	Did not advance		
41	Harald Wigaard	Norway	9.20	9.50	18.70	Did not advance		
45	Ronald Barak	United States	9.25	9.40	18.65	Did not advance		
45	Todor Batchvarov	Bulgaria	9.25	9.40	18.65	Did not advance		
45	Pasquale Carminucci	Italy	9.45	9.20	18.65	Did not advance		
45	Fredy Egger	Switzerland	9.25	9.40	18.65	Did not advance		
45	Gheorghe Tohaneanu	Romania	9.40	9.25	18.65	Did not advance		
45	Lajos Varga	Hungary	9.40	9.25	18.65	Did not advance		
45	Angelo Vicardi	Italy	9.25	9.40	18.65	Did not advance		
52	Istvan Aranyos	Hungary	9.40	9.20	18.60	Did not advance		
52	Raimo Heinonen	Finland	9.15	9.45	18.60	Did not advance		
52	Alojz Petrovic	Yugoslavia	9.25	9.35	18.60	Did not advance		
55	Fritz Feuz	Switzerland	9.45	9.10	18.55	Did not advance		
55	Andras Lelkes	Hungary	9.20	9.35	18.55	Did not advance		
55	Nicola Prodanov	Bulgaria	9.25	9.30	18.55	Did not advance		
55	Hannu Rantakari	Finland	9.20	9.35	18.55	Did not advance		
55	Martin Srot	Yugoslavia	9.40	9.15	18.55	Did not advance		
60	Janez Brodnik	Yugoslavia	9.20	9.30	18.50	Did not advance		
60	Franz Fah	Switzerland	9.20	9.30	18.50	Did not advance		
60	Richard Kihn	Canada	9.25	9.25	18.50	Did not advance		
60	Georgi Mirtchev	Bulgaria	9.00	9.50	18.50	Did not advance		
60	Peter Sos	Hungary	9.30	9.20	18.50	Did not advance		
60	Wilhelm Weiler	Canada	9.10	9.40	18.50	Did not advance		
66	Michel Bouchonnet	France	9.25	9.15	18.40	Did not advance		
66	Todor Kondev	Bulgaria	9.25	9.15	18.40	Did not advance		
68	Larry Banner	United States	9.45	8.90	18.35	Did not advance		
68	Gottlieb Fassler	Switzerland	9.15	9.20	18.35	Did not advance		
68	Kauko Heikkinen	Finland	9.30	9.05	18.35	Did not advance		
68	Age Storhaug	Norway	9.30	9.05	18.35	Did not advance		
72	Bernard Fauqueux	France	9.40	8.90	18.30	Did not advance		
72	Andrzej Konopka	Poland	9.20	9.10	18.30	Did not advance		
72	Alexandru Szilagyi	Romania	9.05	9.25	18.30	Did not advance		
75	Meinrad Berchtold	Switzerland	9.30	8.95	18.25	Did not advance		
75	Gyozo Cser	Hungary	8.95	9.30	18.25	Did not advance		
75	Otto Kestola	Finland	9.05	9.20	18.25	Did not advance		
75	Karel Klecka	Czechoslovakia	9.40	8.85	18.25	Did not advance		
79	Bruno Franceschetti	Italy	9.20	9.00	18.20	Did not advance		
79	Mohamed Lazhari	Algeria	9.15	9.05	18.20	Did not advance		
79	Petre Miclaus	Romania	9.10	9.10	18.20	Did not advance		
79	William Thoresson	Sweden	9.15	9.05	18.20	Did not advance		
83	Ivan Caklec	Yugoslavia	9.25	8.90	18.15	Did not advance		
83	Velik Kapsasov	Bulgaria	9.20	8.95	18.15	Did not advance		
83	Leif Koorn	Sweden	8.80	9.35	18.15	Did not advance		
83	Vaclav Kubicka	Czechoslovakia	8.85	9.30	18.15	Did not advance		
87	Graham Bond	Australia	9.00	9.10	18.10	Did not advance		
87	Gheorghe Condovici	Romania	8.95	9.15	18.10	Did not advance		
87	Russell Mitchell	United States	9.30	8.80	18.10	Did not advance		
87	Nenad Vidovic	Yugoslavia	9.20	8.90	18.10	Did not advance		
91	Gilbert Larose	Canada	9.05	9.00	18.05	Did not advance		
92	Wilhelm Kubica	Poland	9.45	8.55	18.00	Did not advance		
92	Héctor Ramírez	Cuba	9.10	8.90	18.00	Did not advance		
94	Ady Stefanetti	Luxembourg	9.00	8.95	17.95	Did not advance		
95	Liuh Reng Suhn	Taiwan	8.90	9.00	17.90	Did not advance		
95	Octavio Suarez	Cuba	8.85	9.05	17.90	Did not advance		
97	Uih Yah Torh	Taiwan	9.00	8.80	17.80	Did not advance		
98	Lee Kwang Jae	South Korea	9.45	8.25	17.70	Did not advance		
99	Carlos Garcia	Cuba	8.70	8.95	17.65	Did not advance		
99	Arthur Shurlock	United States	9.25	8.40	17.65	Did not advance		
101	Marcus Faulks	Australia	8.65	8.95	17.60	Did not advance		
101	Alfred Kucharczyk	Poland	8.30	9.30	17.60	Did not advance		
101	Niamdawaa Zagdbazar	Mongolia	8.95	8.65	17.60	Did not advance		
104	Barry Cheales	Australia	8.50	9.00	17.50	Did not advance		
104	Jan Thai San	Taiwan	8.20	9.30	17.50	Did not advance		
106	Andres Gonzalez	Cuba	8.65	8.80	17.45	Did not advance		
106	Carlos Pizzini	Argentina	8.50	8.95	17.45	Did not advance		
108	Lai Chu Long	Taiwan	8.35	9.05	17.40	Did not advance		
108	Felix Padron	Cuba	8.55	8.85	17.40	Did not advance		
110	John Pancott	Great Britain	8.75	8.60	17.35	Did not advance		
111	John Mulhall	Great Britain	8.60	8.60	17.20	Did not advance		
112	Liuben Christov	Bulgaria	9.30	7.80	17.10	Did not advance		
113	Pablo Hernandez	Cuba	8.50	8.55	17.05	Did not advance		
113	Frederick Trainer	Australia	8.60	8.45	17.05	Did not advance		
115	Benjamin de Roo	Australia	8.25	8.70	16.95	Did not advance		
116	Jalal Bazargan	Iran	8.15	8.70	16.85	Did not advance		
116	Kang Soo Il	South Korea	8.85	8.00	16.85	Did not advance		
118	Lee Bu Ti	Taiwan	8.30	8.50	16.80	Did not advance		
119	Wang Shian Ming	Taiwan	8.15	8.55	16.70	Did not advance		
120	Suh Jae Kyu	South Korea	7.10	9.45	16.55	Did not advance		
121	Douglas McLennon	Australia	7.40	8.80	16.20	Did not advance		
122	B. Bhosle	India	6.80	8.10	14.90	Did not advance		
123	Trilok Singh	India	6.10	8.05	14.15	Did not advance		
124	Anant Ram	India	6.80	6.60	13.40	Did not advance		
125	Vithal Karande	India	6.35	6.75	13.10	Did not advance		
126	Y. More	India	5.30	7.75	13.05	Did not advance		
127	Mohamed Ibrahim	Egypt	8.20	—	8.20	Did not advance		
128	D. Mondal	India	7.80	—	7.80	Did not advance		
—	Demetrio Pastrana	Philippines	DNS			Did not advance		
—	Fortunato Payao	Philippines	DNS			Did not advance		

== Sources ==
- Tokyo Organizing Committee (1964). The Games of the XVIII Olympiad: Tokyo 1964, vol. 2.
