= Gymnastics at the 1964 Summer Olympics – Men's floor =

Men's floor exercise at the Games of the XVIII Olympiad
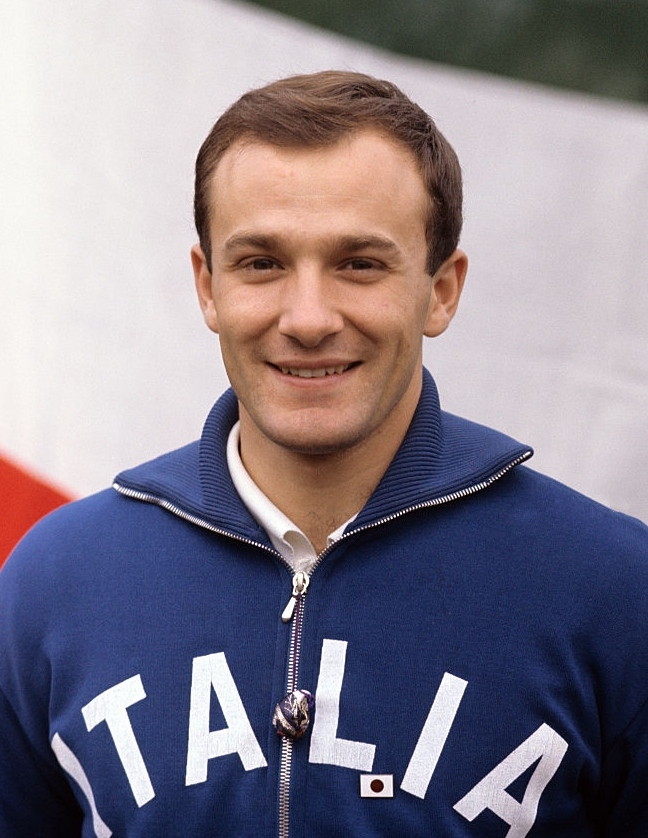
- Gold medalist Franco Menichelli (1964)
- Venue: Tokyo Metropolitan Gymnasium

Medalists
1st place, gold medalist(s)		Franco Menichelli	Italy
2nd place, silver medalist(s)		Yukio Endo	Japan
3rd place, bronze medalist(s)		Viktor Lisitsky	Soviet Union

The men's floor exercise was a gymnastics event contested as part of the Gymnastics at the 1964 Summer Olympics programme at the Tokyo Metropolitan Gymnasium.

== Medalists ==
Gold	Silver	Silver
Franco Menichelli; Italy	Yukio Endo; Japan	Viktor Lisitsky; Soviet Union

== Results ==
=== Preliminary ===
Each gymnast competed in both compulsory and optional exercises, with the median scores from the four judges for the two sets of exercises were summed. This score was also used in calculating both individual all-around and team scores.

The top 6 advanced to the final for the apparatus, keeping half of their preliminary score to be added to their final score.

1.	Yukio Endo (JPN)	9.65	9.75	19.40	QF
2.	Viktor Lisitsky (URS)	9.60	9.70	19.30	QF
2.	Franco Menichelli (ITA)	9.60	9.70	19.30	QF
4.	Victor Leontyev (URS)	9.55	9.65	19.20	QF
4.	Mitsukuri Takashi (JPN)	9.55	9.65	19.20	QF
4.	Yury Tsapenko (URS)	9.60	9.60	19.20	QF
7.	Takuji Hayata (JPN)	9.55	9.60	19.15
7.	Yamashita Haruhiro (JPN)	9.60	9.55	19.15
9.	Sergey Diomidov (URS)	9.65	9.45	19.10
9.	Tsurumi Shuji (JPN)	9.50	9.60	19.10
11.	Otto Kestola (FIN)	9.40	9.65	19.05
12.	Siegfried Fulle (EUA)	9.30	9.70	19.00
12.	Russell Mitchell (USA)	9.50	9.50	19.00
14.	Klaus Köste (EUA)	9.40	9.55	18.95
14.	Boris Shakhlin (URS)	9.45	9.50	18.95
16.	Takashi Ono (JPN)	9.30	9.60	18.90
16.	William Thoresson (SWE)	9.40	9.50	18.90
18.	Alfred Kucharczyk (POL)	9.35	9.50	18.85
18.	Aleksander Rokosa (POL)	9.40	9.45	18.85
18.	Peter Weber (EUA)	9.40	9.45	18.85
21.	Mikolaj Kubica (POL)	9.35	9.45	18.80
21.	Vaclav Kubicka (TCH)	9.35	9.45	18.80
23.	Olli Laiho (FIN)	9.25	9.50	18.75
23.	Gunter Lyhs (EUA)	9.40	9.35	18.75
23.	Alexandru Szilagyi (ROU)	9.35	9.40	18.75
26.	Eugen Ekman (FIN)	9.40	9.30	18.70
26.	Todor Kondev (BUL)	9.30	9.40	18.70
26.	Hannu Rantakari (FIN)	9.25	9.45	18.70
26.	Yury Titov (URS)	9.50	9.20	18.70
30.	Giovanni Carminucci (ITA)	9.25	9.40	18.65
30.	Miroslav Cerar (YUG)	9.40	9.25	18.65
30.	Fritz Feuz (SUI)	9.35	9.30	18.65
30.	Philipp Furst (EUA)	9.35	9.30	18.65
30.	Kauko Heikkinen (FIN)	9.30	9.35	18.65
35.	Jan Jankowicz (POL)	9.25	9.35	18.60
35.	Karel Klecka (TCH)	9.30	9.30	18.60
35.	Nicola Prodanov (BUL)	9.30	9.30	18.60
38.	Wilhelm Kubica (POL)	9.20	9.35	18.55
38.	Age Storhaug (NOR)	9.25	9.30	18.55
38.	Lajos Varga (HUN)	9.35	9.20	18.55
41.	Istvan Aranyos (HUN)	9.30	9.20	18.50
41.	Rajmund Csanyi (HUN)	9.20	9.30	18.50
41.	Raimo Heinonen (FIN)	9.20	9.30	18.50
41.	Premysl Krbec (TCH)	9.10	9.40	18.50
41.	Héctor Ramírez (CUB)	9.30	9.20	18.50
46.	Luigi Cimnaghi (ITA)	9.10	9.35	18.45
46.	Erwin Koppe (EUA)	9.15	9.30	18.45
46.	Georgi Mirtchev (BUL)	9.15	9.30	18.45
46.	Bohumil Mudrik (TCH)	9.20	9.25	18.45
46.	Gheorghe Tohaneanu (ROU)	9.30	9.15	18.45
46.	Gregor Weiss (USA)	9.20	9.25	18.45
52.	Stig Lindevall (SWE)	9.10	9.30	18.40
52.	Makoto Sakamoto (USA)	9.05	9.35	18.40
54.	Ronald Barak (USA)	9.05	9.30	18.35
54.	Anton Kadar (ROU)	9.10	9.25	18.35
54.	Kang Soo Il (KOR)	9.10	9.25	18.35
54.	Andrzej Konopka (POL)	9.00	9.35	18.35
54.	Lee Kwang Jae (KOR)	8.90	9.45	18.35
54.	Suh Jae Kyu (KOR)	9.00	9.35	18.35
60.	Frederic Orendi (ROU)	9.15	9.15	18.30
61.	Janez Brodnik (YUG)	9.05	9.20	18.25
61.	Pasquale Carminucci (ITA)	9.15	9.10	18.25
61.	Fredy Egger (SUI)	9.15	9.10	18.25
61.	Kim Kwang Duk (KOR)	9.05	9.20	18.25
65.	Chung Yi Kwang (KOR)	9.00	9.20	18.20
65.	Richard Kihn (CAN)	8.95	9.25	18.20
65.	Leif Koorn (SWE)	9.05	9.15	18.20
68.	Ivan Caklec (YUG)	9.00	9.15	18.15
69.	Larry Banner (USA)	8.90	9.20	18.10
69.	Meinrad Berchtold (SUI)	9.10	9.00	18.10
69.	Bruno Franceschetti (ITA)	8.85	9.25	18.10
69.	Kim Choong Tai (KOR)	9.05	9.05	18.10
69.	Ladislav Pazdera (TCH)	9.00	9.10	18.10
74.	Christian Guiffroy (FRA)	9.20	8.85	18.05
74.	Peter Sos (HUN)	9.30	8.75	18.05
76.	Todor Batchvarov (BUL)	8.80	9.20	18.00
76.	Gilbert Larose (CAN)	8.85	9.15	18.00
78.	Andras Lelkes (HUN)	9.10	8.85	17.95
78.	Petre Miclaus (ROU)	8.95	9.00	17.95
78.	Nenad Vidovic (YUG)	8.95	9.00	17.95
81.	Gyozo Cser (HUN)	9.20	8.70	17.90
81.	Felix Padron (CUB)	9.05	8.85	17.90
81.	Wilhelm Weiler (CAN)	8.90	9.00	17.90
84.	Michel Bouchonnet (FRA)	8.80	9.05	17.85
84.	Bernard Fauqueux (FRA)	8.85	9.00	17.85
84.	Andres Gonzalez (CUB)	8.95	8.90	17.85
84.	Velik Kapsazov (BUL)	8.65	9.20	17.85
84.	Angelo Vicardi (ITA)	8.65	9.20	17.85
89.	Alojz Petrovic (YUG)	9.00	8.75	17.75
89.	Niamdawaa Zagdbazar (MGL)	8.90	8.85	17.75
91.	Ady Stefanetti (LUX)	8.85	8.85	17.70
92.	Gheorghe Condovici (ROU)	8.75	8.85	17.60
92.	Octavio Suarez (CUB)	8.75	8.85	17.60
94.	Gottlieb Fassler (SUI)	8.85	8.65	17.50
94.	Mohamed Ibrahim (EGY)	8.80	8.70	17.50
94.	Jan Thai San (ROC)	8.70	8.80	17.50
94.	Liuh Reng Suhn (ROC)	8.70	8.80	17.50
98.	Liuben Christov (BUL)	8.45	9.00	17.45
99.	Mohamed Lazhari (ALG)	8.80	8.60	17.40
100.	Walter Muller (SUI)	8.85	8.50	17.35
100.	Arthur Shurlock (USA)	8.70	9.65	17.35
100.	Martin Srot (YUG)	8.60	8.75	17.35
103.	Frederick Trainer (AUS)	8.60	8.70	17.30
104.	Marcus Faulks (AUS)	8.70	8.55	17.25
105.	Carlos Garcia (CUB)	8.70	8.50	17.20
105.	Douglas McLennon (AUS)	8.20	9.00	17.20
105.	John Pancott (GBR)	8.80	8.40	17.20
108.	Graham Bond (AUS)	8.80	8.35	17.15
108.	B. Bhosle (IND)	8.60	8.55	17.15
110.	Wang Shian Ming (ROC)	8.75	8.35	17.10
111.	Barry Cheales (AUS)	8.55	8.50	17.05
112.	Carlos Pizzini (ARG)	8.15	8.70	16.85
113.	Benjamin de Roo (AUS)	8.35	8.45	16.80
113.	Uih Yah Torh (ROC)	8.40	8.40	16.80
115.	Franz Fah (SUI)	8.30	8.45	16.75
116.	Vithal Karande (IND)	8.30	8.15	16.45
117.	Trilok Singh (IND)	8.15	8.15	16.30
118.	Lee Bu Ti (ROC)	7.80	8.20	16.00
119.	Lai Chu Long (ROC)	7.50	8.30	15.80
120.	Anant Ram (IND)	7.60	8.15	15.75
121.	Pablo Hernandez (CUB)	7.20	8.45	15.65
122.	John Mulhall (GBR)	7.70	7.75	15.45
123.	Jalal Bazargan (IRI)	7.45	7.50	14.95
124.	Y. More (IND)	7.75	7.10	14.85
125.	Fortunato Payao (PHI)	6.50	5.00	11.50
126.	Josy Stoffel (LUX)	9.10	1.00	10.10
127.	Pavel Gajdos (TCH)	9.00	1.00	10.00
128.	Harald Wigaard (NOR)	—	9.10	9.10
129.	D. Mondal (IND)	7.90	—	7.90
130.	Demetrio Pastrana (PHI)	—	6.50	6.50

=== Final ===
	Franco Menichelli (ITA)	9.650 (2nd)	+9.800 (1st)	19.450
	Yukio Endo (JPN)	9.700 (1st)	+9.650 (3rd)	19.350
	Viktor Lisitsky (URS)	9.650 (2nd)	+9.700 (2nd)	19.350
4.	Victor Leontyev (URS)	9.600 (3rd)	+9.600 (4th)	19.200
5.	Mitsukuri Takashi (JPN)	9.600 (3rd)	+9.500 (5th)	19.100
6.	Yury Tsapenko (URS)	9.600 (3rd)	+9.250 (4th)	18.850

== Sources ==
- Tokyo Organizing Committee (1964). The Games of the XVIII Olympiad: Tokyo 1964, vol. 2.
