= Gymnastics at the 1964 Summer Olympics – Men's artistic individual all-around =

Olympic gymnastics event

Men's artistic individual all-around at the Games of the XVIII Olympiad
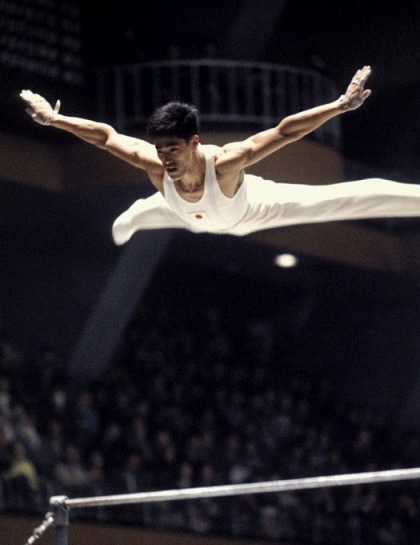
- Gold medalist Yukio Endō competing on the horizontal bar
- Venue: Tokyo Metropolitan Gymnasium
- Dates: 18 October 1964 (qualifying); 20 October 1964 (final)
- Competitors: 130 from 30 nations
- Winning score: 115.95

Medalists
1st place, gold medalist(s)		Yukio Endō; Japan
2nd place, silver medalist(s)		Viktor Lisitsky; Soviet Union
2nd place, silver medalist(s)		Boris Shakhlin; Soviet Union
2nd place, silver medalist(s)		Shuji Tsurumi; Japan

The men's individual all-around was a gymnastics event contested as part of the Gymnastics at the 1964 Summer Olympics programme at the Tokyo Metropolitan Gymnasium. It was held on 18 and 20 October. There were 130 competitors from 30 nations. Each nation could send a team of 6 gymnasts or up to 3 individuals. The event was won by Yukio Endō of Japan, the nation's first victory in the event after two consecutive Games with silver medals. Endō snapped the Soviet Union's three-Games gold medal streak and started a three-Games streak for Japan, as the two nations reached the height of their four-decade combined dominance of the event. Three silver medals were awarded after a tie between Viktor Lisitsky and Boris Shakhlin of the Soviet Union and Shuji Tsurumi of Japan. Shakhlin, the defending gold medalist, thus became the seventh man to win multiple medals in the all-around. For the second consecutive Games, Japan and the Soviet Union took 11 of the top 13 places (and, for the second consecutive Games, Yugoslavia's Miroslav Cerar and Italy's Franco Menichelli were the two men in the top 10 not from those two nations).

== Background ==
This was the 14th appearance of the men's individual all-around. The first individual all-around competition had been held in 1900, after the 1896 competitions featured only individual apparatus events. A men's individual all-around has been held every Games since 1900.

Eight of the top 10 gymnasts from the 1960 Games returned: gold medalist Boris Shakhlin of the Soviet Union, two-time silver medalist Takashi Ono of Japan, two-time bronze medalist Yuri Titov of the Soviet Union, fourth-place finisher Shuji Tsurumi of Japan, fifth-place finisher Yukio Endō of Japan, eighth-place finisher Miroslav Cerar of Yugoslavia, ninth-place finisher Takashi Mitsukuri of Japan, and tenth-place finisher Franco Menichelli of Italy. Titov was the reigning (1962) World Champion, with Endō and Shakhlin (the 1958 World Champion) finishing second and third.

Algeria, the Republic of China, Iran, Mongolia, and the Philippines each made their debut in the event. France and Italy both made their 12th appearance, tied for most among nations.

== Competition format ==
The gymnastics all-around events continued to use the aggregation format. All entrants in the gymnastics competitions performed both a compulsory exercise and a voluntary exercise for each apparatus. The scores for all 12 exercises were summed to give an individual all-around score.

These exercise scores were also used for qualification for the apparatus finals. The two exercises (compulsory and voluntary) for each apparatus were summed to give an apparatus score; the top 6 in each apparatus participated in the finals; others were ranked 7th through 130th. There was no all-around final.

Exercise scores ranged from 0 to 10, apparatus scores from 0 to 20, and individual totals from 0 to 120.

== Schedule ==
All times are Japan Standard Time (UTC+9)

Date	Time	Round
Sunday, 18 October 1964	8:30; 17:00	Preliminary: Compulsory
Tuesday, 20 October 1964	8:30; 17:00	Preliminary: Voluntary

== Results ==
The score for the individual all-around was a simple sum of each gymnast's preliminary scores from the six apparatus events.

Rank	Gymnast	Nation	Floor (gymnastics)	Pommel horse	Rings (gymnastics)	Vault (gymnastics)	Parallel bars	Horizontal bar	Total
1st place, gold medalist(s)	Yukio Endō	Japan	19.40	18.70	19.50	19.40	19.55	19.40	115.95
2nd place, silver medalist(s)	Viktor Lisitsky	Soviet Union	19.30	18.75	19.10	19.50	19.50	19.25	115.40
2nd place, silver medalist(s)	Boris Shakhlin	Soviet Union	18.95	18.90	19.40	19.35	19.25	19.55	115.40
2nd place, silver medalist(s)	Shuji Tsurumi	Japan	19.10	19.25	19.35	19.30	19.50	18.90	115.40
5	Franco Menichelli	Italy	19.30	18.80	19.45	19.05	19.30	19.25	115.15
6	Haruhiro Yamashita	Japan	19.15	19.15	18.75	19.50	19.30	19.25	115.10
7	Miroslav Cerar	Yugoslavia	18.65	19.45	19.05	19.10	19.50	19.30	115.05
8	Takuji Hayata	Japan	19.15	18.90	19.45	19.15	19.15	19.10	114.90
9	Takashi Mitsukuri	Japan	19.20	19.30	19.00	19.05	19.10	19.15	114.80
10	Viktor Leontyev	Soviet Union	19.20	18.70	19.35	18.95	19.15	19.20	114.55
11	Takashi Ono	Japan	18.90	18.90	19.10	19.20	18.90	19.40	114.40
11	Yuri Tsapenko	Soviet Union	19.20	19.10	19.00	19.05	19.05	19.00	114.40
13	Yuri Titov	Soviet Union	18.70	18.60	19.25	19.25	19.05	19.50	114.35
14	Sergei Diomidov	Soviet Union	19.10	18.75	18.85	19.25	19.35	18.90	114.20
15	Siegfried Fülle	United Team of Germany	19.00	18.80	19.05	19.30	19.00	18.95	114.10
16	Mikołaj Kubica	Poland	18.80	18.70	18.80	19.10	18.70	19.10	113.20
17	Rajmund Csányi	Hungary	18.50	18.55	18.60	19.10	19.00	19.25	113.00
18	Klaus Köste	United Team of Germany	18.95	18.55	18.25	19.10	19.00	18.90	112.75
19	Erwin Koppe	United Team of Germany	18.45	18.60	18.80	18.75	19.05	18.80	112.45
20	Makoto Sakamoto	United States	18.40	18.50	18.80	18.95	18.90	18.85	112.40
21	Luigi Cimnaghi	Italy	18.45	18.70	18.50	18.75	19.05	18.90	112.35
21	Peter Weber	United Team of Germany	18.85	18.40	18.85	19.00	18.75	18.50	112.35
23	Nicola Prodanov	Bulgaria	18.60	18.40	18.45	19.25	18.55	19.05	112.30
24	Philipp Fürst	United Team of Germany	18.65	18.65	18.50	18.95	18.90	18.60	112.25
25	Aleksander Rokosa	Poland	18.85	18.10	18.60	18.85	18.80	18.75	111.95
26	Olli Laiho	Finland	18.75	18.30	18.35	18.85	18.85	18.75	111.85
27	Giovanni Carminucci	Italy	18.65	18.20	18.65	18.75	19.30	18.25	111.80
28	István Aranyos	Hungary	18.50	18.55	18.25	18.95	18.60	18.90	111.75
29	Günter Lyhs	United Team of Germany	18.75	18.00	18.55	19.15	18.80	18.45	111.70
30	Bohumil Mudřík	Czechoslovakia	18.45	18.60	18.25	18.95	18.80	18.45	111.50
31	Frederic Orendi	Romania	18.30	18.55	17.90	18.90	18.80	18.95	111.40
32	Russell Mitchell	United States	19.00	18.45	18.70	18.90	18.10	18.05	111.20
32	Åge Storhaug	Norway	18.55	18.75	17.90	19.00	18.35	18.65	111.20
34	Eugen Ekman	Finland	18.70	18.70	17.85	18.85	18.80	18.25	111.15
35	Wilhelm Kubica	Poland	18.55	18.40	18.35	18.75	18.00	19.05	111.10
35	Lajos Varga	Hungary	18.55	18.15	18.30	18.40	18.65	19.05	111.10
37	Velik Kapsazov	Bulgaria	17.85	18.15	19.15	18.80	18.15	18.95	111.05
37	Alfred Kucharczyk	Poland	18.85	18.20	18.50	19.30	17.60	18.60	111.05
39	Ronald Barak	United States	18.35	18.10	18.70	18.45	18.65	18.75	111.00
40	Raimo Heinonen	Finland	18.50	18.50	17.85	19.10	18.60	18.40	110.95
41	Georgi Mirchev	Bulgaria	18.45	18.15	18.00	18.90	18.50	18.75	110.75
42	Pasquale Carminucci	Italy	18.25	18.25	18.60	18.70	18.65	18.25	110.70
42	Ladislav Pazdera	Czechoslovakia	18.10	18.40	18.40	18.40	18.80	18.60	110.70
44	Václav Kubička	Czechoslovakia	18.80	17.40	18.70	18.90	18.15	18.70	110.65
45	Jan Jankowicz	Poland	18.60	17.55	18.30	18.60	18.80	18.75	110.60
45	Přemysl Krbec	Czechoslovakia	18.50	16.95	18.75	19.25	18.70	18.45	110.60
45	Gheorghe Tohăneanu	Romania	18.45	18.00	18.10	18.85	18.65	18.55	110.60
48	Fritz Feuz	Switzerland	18.65	18.55	17.20	19.15	18.55	18.40	110.50
48	Christian Guiffroy	France	18.05	18.55	17.50	18.55	19.15	18.70	110.50
48	Hannu Rantakari	Finland	18.70	18.25	17.60	19.35	18.55	18.05	110.50
51	Anton Cadar	Romania	18.35	17.70	18.55	18.75	18.80	18.30	110.45
52	Karel Klečka	Czechoslovakia	18.60	17.95	17.95	18.75	18.25	18.85	110.35
53	Kim Chung-tae	South Korea	18.10	18.80	17.55	18.50	18.95	18.30	110.20
54	Stig Lindewall	Sweden	18.40	17.30	18.55	18.70	19.00	18.20	110.15
55	Larry Banner	United States	18.10	18.30	18.05	18.75	18.35	18.50	110.05
55	Todor Kondev	Bulgaria	18.70	18.15	17.90	18.50	18.40	18.40	110.05
57	Janez Brodnik	Yugoslavia	18.25	18.05	18.05	18.45	18.50	18.70	110.00
58	Otto Kestola	Finland	19.05	18.00	17.50	18.70	18.25	18.45	109.95
59	Gregor Weiss	United States	18.45	18.05	18.55	18.80	18.80	17.25	109.90
60	Kim Gwang-deok	South Korea	18.25	17.85	18.05	18.25	18.80	18.60	109.80
61	Alojz Petrovič	Yugoslavia	17.75	18.20	18.35	18.80	18.60	18.00	109.70
62	Todor Bachvarov	Bulgaria	18.00	18.15	17.80	18.70	18.65	18.35	109.65
63	Angelo Vicardi	Italy	17.85	18.50	17.50	18.65	18.65	18.25	109.40
64	Kauko Heikkinen	Finland	18.65	18.65	17.80	18.45	18.35	17.45	109.35
65	Walter Müller	Switzerland	17.35	18.65	17.50	19.25	18.95	17.55	109.25
65	Martin Šrot	Yugoslavia	17.35	17.55	18.65	18.75	18.55	18.40	109.25
67	Leif Koorn	Sweden	18.20	18.20	19.10	18.65	18.15	16.90	109.20
68	Arthur Shurlock	United States	17.35	18.85	18.30	18.80	17.65	18.15	109.10
69	Alexandru Szilaghi	Romania	18.75	17.70	17.95	18.80	18.30	17.55	109.05
70	Jeong Ri-gwang	South Korea	18.20	17.25	17.75	18.25	18.70	18.85	109.00
71	Fredi Egger	Switzerland	18.25	18.25	17.00	19.05	18.65	17.70	108.90
71	András Lelkes	Hungary	17.95	17.85	17.65	18.90	18.55	18.00	108.90
73	Bernard Fauqueux	France	17.85	18.20	17.05	18.70	18.30	18.75	108.85
74	Győző Cser	Hungary	17.90	17.50	18.20	18.30	18.25	18.65	108.80
75	Bruno Franceschetti	Italy	18.10	18.30	18.45	18.55	18.20	17.10	108.70
75	Andrzej Konopka	Poland	18.35	17.20	18.20	18.45	18.30	18.20	108.70
77	William Thoresson	Sweden	18.90	17.50	17.95	18.75	18.20	17.35	108.65
78	Péter Sós	Hungary	18.05	17.05	18.25	18.95	18.50	17.80	108.60
79	Lyuben Khristov	Bulgaria	17.45	18.55	17.75	18.75	17.10	18.80	108.40
80	Ivan Čaklec	Yugoslavia	18.15	18.15	17.50	18.75	18.15	17.60	108.30
81	Lee Gwang-jae	South Korea	18.35	17.75	17.10	18.70	17.70	18.50	108.10
82	Richard Kihn	Canada	18.20	18.25	17.10	18.65	18.50	17.25	107.95
83	Michel Bouchonnet	France	17.85	18.20	16.75	18.75	18.40	17.95	107.90
84	Seo Jae-gyu	South Korea	18.35	18.35	17.70	18.45	16.55	18.45	107.85
85	Gottlieb Fässler	Switzerland	17.50	18.15	17.20	18.85	18.35	17.65	107.70
86	Gheorghe Condovici	Romania	17.60	17.95	17.35	18.50	18.10	17.65	107.15
86	Wilhelm Weiler	Canada	17.90	17.10	17.40	19.20	18.50	17.05	107.15
88	Petre Miclăuș	Romania	17.95	18.05	17.75	18.70	18.20	16.45	107.10
88	Nenad Vidović	Yugoslavia	17.95	18.30	16.90	18.15	18.10	17.70	107.10
90	Meinrad Berchtold	Switzerland	18.10	16.90	16.70	18.90	18.25	18.15	107.00
91	Mohamed Lazhari	Algeria	17.40	18.00	18.00	18.65	18.20	16.70	106.95
92	Gilbert Larose	Canada	18.00	16.65	17.80	18.75	18.05	17.65	106.90
93	Franz Fäh	Switzerland	16.75	17.80	16.25	18.65	18.50	18.20	106.15
94	Zagdbazaryn Davaanyam	Mongolia	17.75	17.25	17.00	18.70	17.60	17.35	105.65
95	Gang Su-il	South Korea	18.35	15.40	18.25	18.65	16.85	17.45	104.95
96	Andrés González	Cuba	17.85	16.90	16.80	18.65	17.45	16.70	104.35
97	Héctor Ramírez	Cuba	18.50	15.60	15.90	18.55	18.00	17.75	104.30
97	Ady Stefanetti	Luxembourg	17.70	14.80	18.45	18.05	17.95	17.35	104.30
97	Octavio Suárez	Cuba	17.60	17.80	17.50	18.60	17.90	14.90	104.30
100	Graham Bond	Australia	17.15	17.05	16.05	18.35	18.10	17.35	104.05
100	Félix Padrón	Cuba	17.90	16.85	16.35	18.15	17.40	17.40	104.05
102	John Pancott	Great Britain	17.20	16.70	17.20	18.50	17.35	17.05	104.00
103	Yan Tai-san	Taiwan	17.50	15.80	16.75	18.15	17.50	17.40	103.10
104	Josy Stoffel	Luxembourg	10.10	18.30	17.90	18.75	18.85	18.25	102.15
105	Frederick Trainer	Australia	17.30	17.45	14.60	18.40	17.05	17.05	101.85
106	Pavel Gajdoš	Czechoslovakia	10.00	18.55	18.35	18.80	18.95	17.10	101.75
107	Harald Wigaard	Norway	9.10	19.05	17.45	18.75	18.70	18.30	101.35
108	Marcus Faulks	Australia	17.25	15.90	15.25	17.70	17.60	17.00	100.70
109	Pablo Hernández	Cuba	15.65	15.35	16.55	17.85	17.05	17.15	99.60
110	Benjamin de Roo	Australia	16.80	15.85	16.20	18.55	16.95	15.15	99.50
111	Douglas MacLennan	Australia	17.20	16.55	16.35	17.85	16.20	15.30	99.45
112	Carlos Pizzini	Argentina	16.85	16.85	16.20	18.50	17.45	13.10	98.95
113	Barry Cheales	Australia	17.05	14.30	14.50	18.25	17.50	17.30	98.90
114	Carlos García	Cuba	17.20	13.15	17.35	17.85	17.65	15.65	98.85
115	John Mulhall	Great Britain	15.45	15.35	16.40	18.85	17.20	15.20	98.45
116	Lai Chu-long	Taiwan	15.80	14.60	14.55	18.10	17.40	17.40	97.85
117	Lee Bu-ti	Taiwan	16.00	13.40	16.80	17.30	16.80	16.80	97.10
118	Jalal Bazargan-Vali	Iran	14.95	15.15	15.80	18.35	16.85	15.25	96.35
119	Wang Shian-ming	Taiwan	17.10	10.00	16.20	17.90	16.70	17.10	95.00
120	Ui Yah-tor	Taiwan	16.80	8.80	17.10	17.55	17.80	14.45	92.50
121	Liu Reng-sun	Taiwan	17.50	6.50	14.90	17.65	17.90	17.55	92.00
122	Bandu Bhosle	India	17.15	13.90	13.00	16.65	14.90	12.15	87.75
123	Vithal Karande	India	16.45	12.30	13.95	17.20	13.10	13.20	86.20
124	Trilok Singh	India	16.30	11.85	13.50	17.80	14.15	6.00	79.60
125	Jagmal More	India	14.85	12.80	13.70	17.15	13.05	6.25	77.80
126	Anant Ram	India	15.75	14.65	12.15	0.00	13.40	10.55	66.50
127	Mohamed Ibrahim	Egypt	17.50	8.25	8.70	9.20	8.20	7.30	59.15
128	Darshan Mondal	India	7.90	7.30	6.65	17.90	7.80	7.15	54.70
129	Fortunato Payao	Philippines	11.50	0.00	0.00	7.50	0.00	0.00	19.00
130	Demetrio Pastrana	Philippines	6.50	0.00	0.00	5.00	0.00	0.00	11.50

== Sources ==
- Tokyo Organizing Committee (1964). The Games of the XVIII Olympiad: Tokyo 1964, vol. 2.
