= Lee Gwang-jae =

Lee Gwang-jae may refer to:

- Lee Gwang-jae (footballer)
- Lee Gwang-jae (gymnast)
- Lee Kwang-jae (politician)
