= Péter Sós =

Hungarian gymnast

- Born: 3 January 1938 (age 88) Budapest, Kingdom of Hungary
- Height: 1.69 m (5 ft 7 in)

Gymnastics career
- Discipline: Men's artistic gymnastics
- Country represented: Hungary
- Club: Budapesti Vörös Meteor Sport Klub

Péter Sós (born 3 January 1938) is a Hungarian gymnast. He competed in eight events at the 1964 Summer Olympics.
