= Bandu Bhosle =

Indian gymnast (born 1945)

- Born: 10 October 1945 (age 80)

Gymnastics career
- Discipline: Men's artistic gymnastics
- Country represented: India

Bandu Bhosle (born 10 October 1945) is an Indian gymnast. He competed in eight events at the 1964 Summer Olympics.
