= Gang Su-il =

South Korean gymnast

- 강수일
- Born: 8 October 1943 (age 82)
- Height: 1.59 m (5 ft 3 in)

Gymnastics career
- Discipline: Men's artistic gymnastics
- Country represented: South Korea

Gang Su-il (born 8 October 1943) is a South Korean gymnast. He competed in eight events at the 1964 Summer Olympics.
