= Gottlieb Fässler =

Swiss gymnast (1934–1996)

- Alternative name: Gody Fässler
- Born: 13 April 1934
- Died: September 1996 (aged 62)
- Height: 1.64 m (5 ft 5 in)

Gymnastics career
- Discipline: Men's artistic gymnastics
- Country represented: Switzerland

Gottlieb Fässler (13 April 1934 – September 1996) was a Swiss gymnast. He competed in eight events at the 1964 Summer Olympics. Fässler died in September 1996, at the age of 62.
