= Seo Jae-gyu =

South Korean gymnast

- 서재규
- Alternative name: Su Jae-kyu
- Born: 27 August 1940 (age 86)
- Height: 1.60 m (5 ft 3 in)

Gymnastics career
- Discipline: Men's artistic gymnastics
- Country represented: South Korea

Seo Jae-gyu (born 27 August 1940) is a South Korean gymnast. He competed in eight events at the 1964 Summer Olympics.
