= Győző Cser =

Hungarian gymnast

- Born: 29 October 1942 (age 83) Budapest, Kingdom of Hungary
- Height: 1.68 m (5 ft 6 in)

Gymnastics career
- Discipline: Men's artistic gymnastics
- Country represented: Hungary
- Club: Budapesti Vörös Meteor Sport Klub

Győző Cser (born 29 October 1942) is a Hungarian gymnast. He competed in eight events at the 1964 Summer Olympics.
