= Nenad Vidović =

Yugoslav gymnast (born 1939)

- Ненад Видовић
- Born: 5 May 1939 (age 87) Kruševac, Kingdom of Yugoslavia
- Height: 1.69 m (5 ft 7 in)

Gymnastics career
- Discipline: Men's artistic gymnastics
- Country represented: Yugoslavia

Nenad Vidović (born 5 May 1939) is a Yugoslav gymnast. He competed in eight events at the 1964 Summer Olympics.
