= Lee Bu-ti =

Taiwanese Olympic gymnast

- 李 武智
- Alternative name: Pinyin: Lǐ Wǔ-zhì
- Born: 11 April 1941 (age 85)
- Height: 1.64 m (5 ft 5 in)

Gymnastics career
- Discipline: Men's artistic gymnastics
- Country represented: Taiwan

Lee Bu-ti (born 11 April 1941) is a Taiwanese gymnast. He competed in eight events at the 1964 Summer Olympics.
