= Alexandru Szilaghi =

Romanian gymnast

- Alternative name: Sándor Szilágyi
- Born: 8 February 1942 (age 84) Kolozsvár, Kingdom of Hungary
- Height: 1.68 m (5 ft 6 in)

Gymnastics career
- Discipline: Men's artistic gymnastics
- Country represented: Romania

Alexandru Szilaghi (born 8 February 1942) is a Romanian gymnast. He competed in eight events at the 1964 Summer Olympics.
