= Darshan Mondal =

Indian gymnast

- Born: 7 June 1940
- Died: 29 May 1971 (aged 30) Calcutta, India

Gymnastics career
- Discipline: Men's artistic gymnastics
- Country represented: India

Darshan Mondal (7 June 1940 – 29 May 1971) was an Indian gymnast. He competed in eight events at the 1964 Summer Olympics.
