= Marcus Faulks =

Australian gymnast

- Full name: Marcus Armer Charles Faulks
- Born: 3 August 1937 (age 89)
- Height: 174 cm (5 ft 9 in)

Gymnastics career
- Discipline: Men's artistic gymnastics
- Country represented: Australia

Marcus Armer Charles Faulks (born 3 August 1937) is an Australian gymnast. He competed in eight events at the 1964 Summer Olympics.
