= Ady Stefanetti =

Luxembourgish gymnast (1942–1995)

- Full name: Adolf Stefanetti
- Born: 17 November 1942 Niederkorn, Luxembourg
- Died: 1 October 1995 (aged 52) Niederkorn, Luxembourg
- Height: 1.59 m (5 ft 3 in)

Gymnastics career
- Discipline: Men's artistic gymnastics
- Country represented: Luxembourg

Adolf "Ady" Stefanetti (17 November 1942 – 1 October 1995) was a Luxembourgish gymnast. He competed in seven events at the 1964 Summer Olympics.
