= Yan Tai-san =

Taiwanese gymnast

- 江 大山
- Alternative name: Pinyin: Jiāng Dà-shān
- Born: 3 January 1938 (age 88)
- Height: 1.57 m (5 ft 2 in)

Gymnastics career
- Discipline: Men's artistic gymnastics
- Country represented: Taiwan

Yan Tai-san (born 3 January 1938) is a Taiwanese gymnast. He competed in eight events at the 1964 Summer Olympics.
