= Richard Kihn =

Canadian gymnast

- Full name: Richard K. Kihn
- Born: 15 August 1935 (age 91) Alzenau, Germany

Gymnastics career
- Discipline: Men's artistic gymnastics
- Country represented: Canada

Richard K. Kihn (born 15 August 1935) is a Canadian gymnast. He competed in seven events at the 1964 Summer Olympics.
