= Vithal Karande =

Indian gymnast

- Born: 12 March 1940 (age 86)

Gymnastics career
- Discipline: Men's artistic gymnastics
- Country represented: India

Vithal Karande (born 12 March 1940) is an Indian gymnast. He competed in eight events at the 1964 Summer Olympics.
