= Fredi Egger =

Swiss gymnast

- Born: 2 March 1941 (age 85)
- Height: 1.73 m (5 ft 8 in)

Gymnastics career
- Discipline: Men's artistic gymnastics
- Country represented: Switzerland

Fredi Egger (born 2 March 1941) is a Swiss gymnast. He competed in eight events at the 1964 Summer Olympics.
