= Mohamed Ibrahim (gymnast) =

Egyptian gymnast

- محمد ابراهيم
- Born: 4 August 1942 (age 84)

Gymnastics career
- Discipline: Men's artistic gymnastics
- Country represented: United Arab Republic

Mohamed Ibrahim (born 4 August 1942) is an Egyptian gymnast. He competed in eight events at the 1964 Summer Olympics.
