= Petre Miclăuș =

Romanian gymnast

- Born: 10 June 1939 (age 87) Satu Mare, Kingdom of Romania
- Height: 1.57 m (5 ft 2 in)

Gymnastics career
- Discipline: Men's artistic gymnastics
- Country represented: Romania

Petre Miclăuș (born 10 June 1939) is a Romanian gymnast. He competed in eight events at the 1964 Summer Olympics.
