= Ui Yah-tor =

Taiwanese gymnast

- 余 雅得
- Alternative name: Pinyin: Yú Yǎ-dé
- Born: 10 August 1938 (age 88)
- Height: 1.60 m (5 ft 3 in)

Gymnastics career
- Discipline: Men's artistic gymnastics
- Country represented: Taiwan

Ui Yah-tor (born 10 August 1938) is a Taiwanese gymnast. He competed in eight events at the 1964 Summer Olympics.
