= Walter Müller (Swiss gymnast) =

Swiss gymnast

- Born: 5 March 1940 (age 86)
- Height: 1.74 m (5 ft 9 in)

Gymnastics career
- Discipline: Men's artistic gymnastics
- Country represented: Switzerland

Walter Müller (born 5 March 1940) is a Swiss gymnast. He competed in eight events at the 1964 Summer Olympics.
