= Todor Kondev =

Bulgarian gymnast (born 1938)

- Тодор Николов Кондев
- Full name: Todor Nikolov Kondev
- Born: 16 November 1938 (age 87)

Gymnastics career
- Discipline: Men's artistic gymnastics
- Country represented: Bulgaria

Todor Nikolov Kondev (Bulgarian: Тодор Николов Кондев) (born 16 November 1938) is a Bulgarian gymnast. He competed in eight events at the 1964 Summer Olympics.
