= Barry Cheales =

Australian gymnast

- Full name: Barry John Bellingham Cheales OAM
- Born: 7 February 1943 (age 83)

Gymnastics career
- Discipline: Men's artistic gymnastics
- Country represented: Australia

Barry John Bellingham Cheales OAM (born 7 February 1943) is an Australian gymnast. He competed in eight events at the 1964 Summer Olympics.

Cheales was awarded the Medal of the Order of Australia in the 1994 Australia Day Honours for "service to the sport of gymnastics". He received the Australian Sports Medal in 2000.
