= Jalal Bazargan =

Iranian gymnast (born 1939)

- جلال بازرگان ولی
- Full name: Jalal Bazargan-Vali
- Alternative name: Djalal Bazarganvali
- Born: 23 December 1939 (age 86)
- Height: 1.70 m (5 ft 7 in)

Gymnastics career
- Discipline: Men's artistic gymnastics
- Country represented: Iran

Jalal Bazargan-Vali (Persian: جلال بازرگان, born 23 December 1939) is an Iranian gymnast. He competed in seven events at the 1964 Summer Olympics.
