= Gheorghe Condovici =

Romanian gymnast

- Born: 30 July 1941 (age 85) Bucharest, Kingdom of Romania
- Height: 1.74 m (5 ft 9 in)

Gymnastics career
- Discipline: Men's artistic gymnastics
- Country represented: Romania

Gheorghe Condovici (born 30 July 1941) is a Romanian gymnast. He competed in eight events at the 1964 Summer Olympics.
