= Carlos Pizzini =

Argentine gymnast (born 1941)

- Full name: Carlos Alberto Pizzini
- Born: 25 November 1941 (age 84)

Gymnastics career
- Discipline: Men's artistic gymnastics
- Country represented: Argentina

Carlos Alberto Pizzini (born 25 November 1941) is an Argentine gymnast. He competed in seven events at the 1964 Summer Olympics.
