= Franz Fäh =

Swiss gymnast

- Born: 22 November 1937 (age 88)
- Height: 1.70 m (5 ft 7 in)

Gymnastics career
- Discipline: Men's artistic gymnastics
- Country represented: Switzerland

Franz Fäh (born 22 November 1937) is a Swiss gymnast. He competed in eight events at the 1964 Summer Olympics.
