= Jagmal More =

Indian gymnast

- Born: 10 September 1944 (age 81)

Gymnastics career
- Discipline: Men's artistic gymnastics
- Country represented: India

Jagmal More (born 10 September 1944) is an Indian gymnast. He competed in eight events at the 1964 Summer Olympics.
