= Liu Reng-sun =

Taiwanese gymnast

- 劉 年盛
- Alternative name: Pinyin: Liú Nián-shèng
- Born: 28 October 1941 (age 84)
- Height: 1.56 m (5 ft 1 in)

Gymnastics career
- Discipline: Men's artistic gymnastics
- Country represented: Taiwan

Liu Reng-sun (born 28 October 1941) is a Taiwanese gymnast. He competed in eight events at the 1964 Summer Olympics.
