= Frederick Trainer =

Australian gymnast

- Full name: Frederick Edward Trainer
- Born: 5 March 1941 (age 85)
- Height: 183 cm (6 ft 0 in)

Gymnastics career
- Discipline: Men's artistic gymnastics
- Country represented: Australia

Frederick Edward Trainer (born 5 March 1941) is an Australian gymnast. He competed in eight events at the 1964 Summer Olympics.
