= Trilok Singh =

Indian gymnast

- Born: 13 June 1933 (age 93) Sylghe District, Pithoragarh district, British India

Gymnastics career
- Discipline: Men's artistic gymnastics
- Country represented: India

Trilok Singh (born 13 June 1933) is an Indian gymnast. He competed in eight events at the 1964 Summer Olympics.
