= Jeong Ri-gwang =

South Korean gymnast

- 정리광
- Alternative name: Chung Yi-kwang
- Born: 11 January 1942 (age 84)
- Height: 1.62 m (5 ft 4 in)

Gymnastics career
- Discipline: Men's artistic gymnastics
- Country represented: South Korea

Jeong Ri-gwang (born 11 January 1942) is a South Korean gymnast. He competed in eight events at the 1964 Summer Olympics.
