= Gheorghe Tohăneanu =

Romanian gymnast

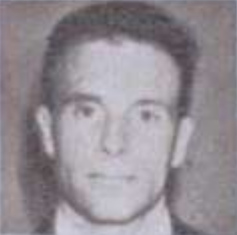
- Born: 1 June 1936 (age 90) Întorsura Buzăului, Kingdom of Romania
- Height: 1.72 m (5 ft 8 in)

Gymnastics career
- Discipline: Men's artistic gymnastics
- Country represented: Romania

Gheorghe Tohăneanu (born 1 June 1936) is a Romanian gymnast. He competed in eight events at the 1964 Summer Olympics.
