= Doug MacLennan =

Australian gymnast

- Full name: Douglas MacLennan
- Born: 2 November 1939 (age 86)
- Height: 173 cm (5 ft 8 in)

Gymnastics career
- Discipline: Men's artistic gymnastics
- Country represented: Australia

Douglas Maclennan (born 2 November 1939) is an Australian gymnast. He competed in eight events at the 1964 Summer Olympics.
