= Pablo Hernández (gymnast) =

Cuban gymnast

- Full name: Pablo Luis Hernández
- Born: 1 November 1944 (age 81)

Gymnastics career
- Discipline: Men's artistic gymnastics
- Country represented: Cuba

Pablo Luis Hernández (born 1 November 1944) is a Cuban gymnast. He competed in eight events at the 1964 Summer Olympics.
