= Wang Shian-ming =

Taiwanese gymnast

- 王 賢明
- Alternative name: Pinyin: Wáng Xián-míng
- Born: 8 September 1940 (age 85)
- Height: 1.60 m (5 ft 3 in)

Gymnastics career
- Discipline: Men's artistic gymnastics
- Country represented: Taiwan

Wang Shian-ming (born 8 September 1940) is a Taiwanese gymnast. He competed in eight events at the 1964 Summer Olympics.
