= Félix Padron =

Cuban gymnast (born 1936)

- Full name: Félix Rafael Padron Borroto
- Born: 1 December 1936 (age 89)

Gymnastics career
- Discipline: Men's artistic gymnastics
- Country represented: Cuba

Félix Rafael Padron Borroto (born 1 December 1936) is a Cuban gymnast. He competed in eight events at the 1964 Summer Olympics.
