= Kim Gwang-deok =

South Korean gymnast (born 1942)

- 김광덕
- Alternative name: Kim Kwang-duk
- Born: 1 January 1942 (age 84)
- Height: 1.63 m (5 ft 4 in)

Gymnastics career
- Discipline: Men's artistic gymnastics
- Country represented: South Korea

Kim Gwang-deok (born 1 January 1942) is a South Korean gymnast. He competed in eight events at the 1964 Summer Olympics.
