= Tokyo Metropolitan Gymnasium =

Sporting complex in Sendagaya, Shibuya, Tokyo, Japan

Coordinates: 35°40′47″N 139°42′45″E

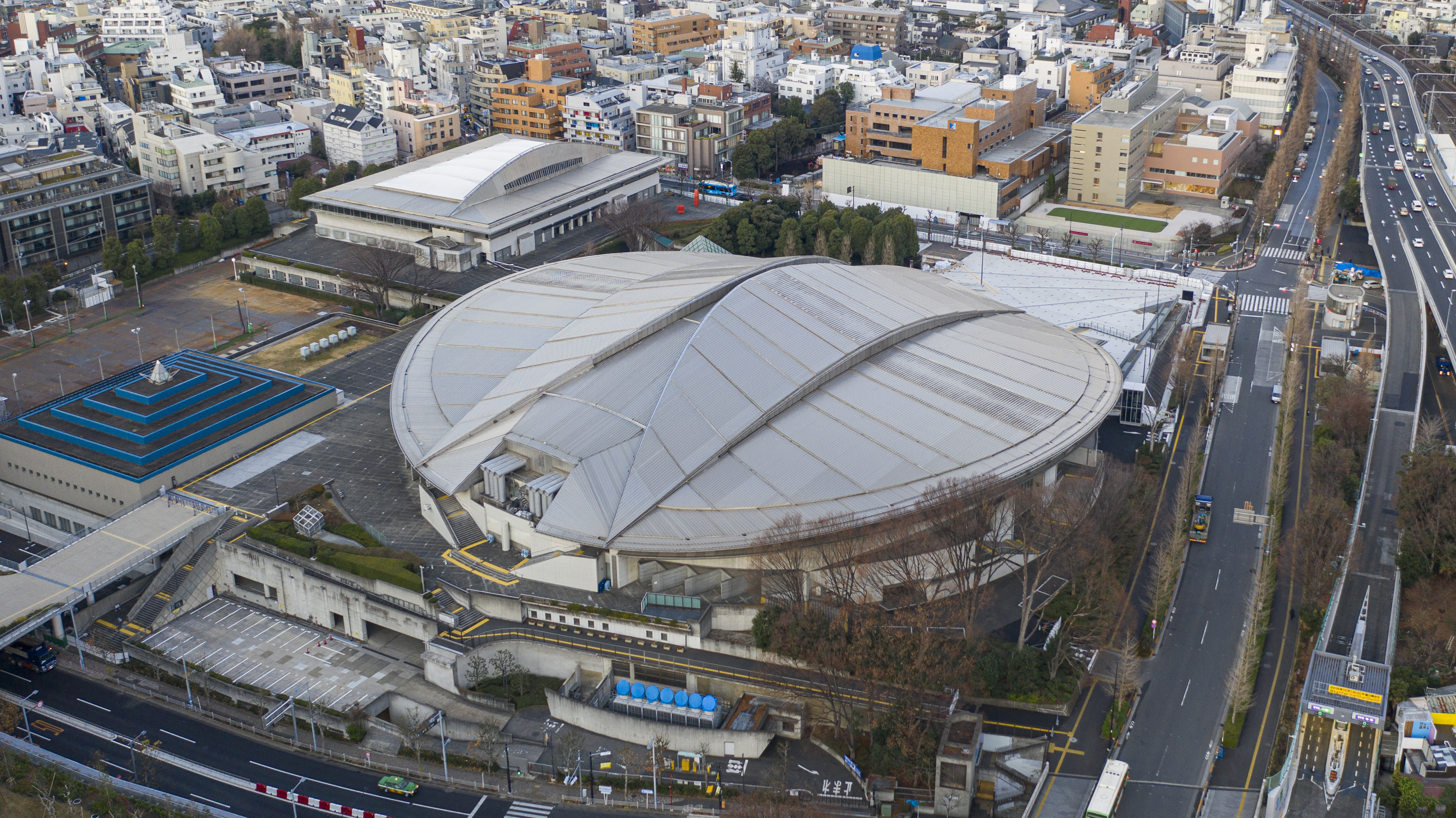
- Interactive map of Tokyo Metropolitan Gymnasium
- Location: Shibuya, Tokyo, Japan
- Owner: Tokyo Metropolitan Government
- Capacity: 10,000
- Public transit: JR East : Chuo-Sobu Line at Sendagaya; Toei Subway: Ōedo Line at Kokuritsu-kyogijo

Construction
- Groundbreaking: 1952
- Opened: 1954
- Renovated: 1990

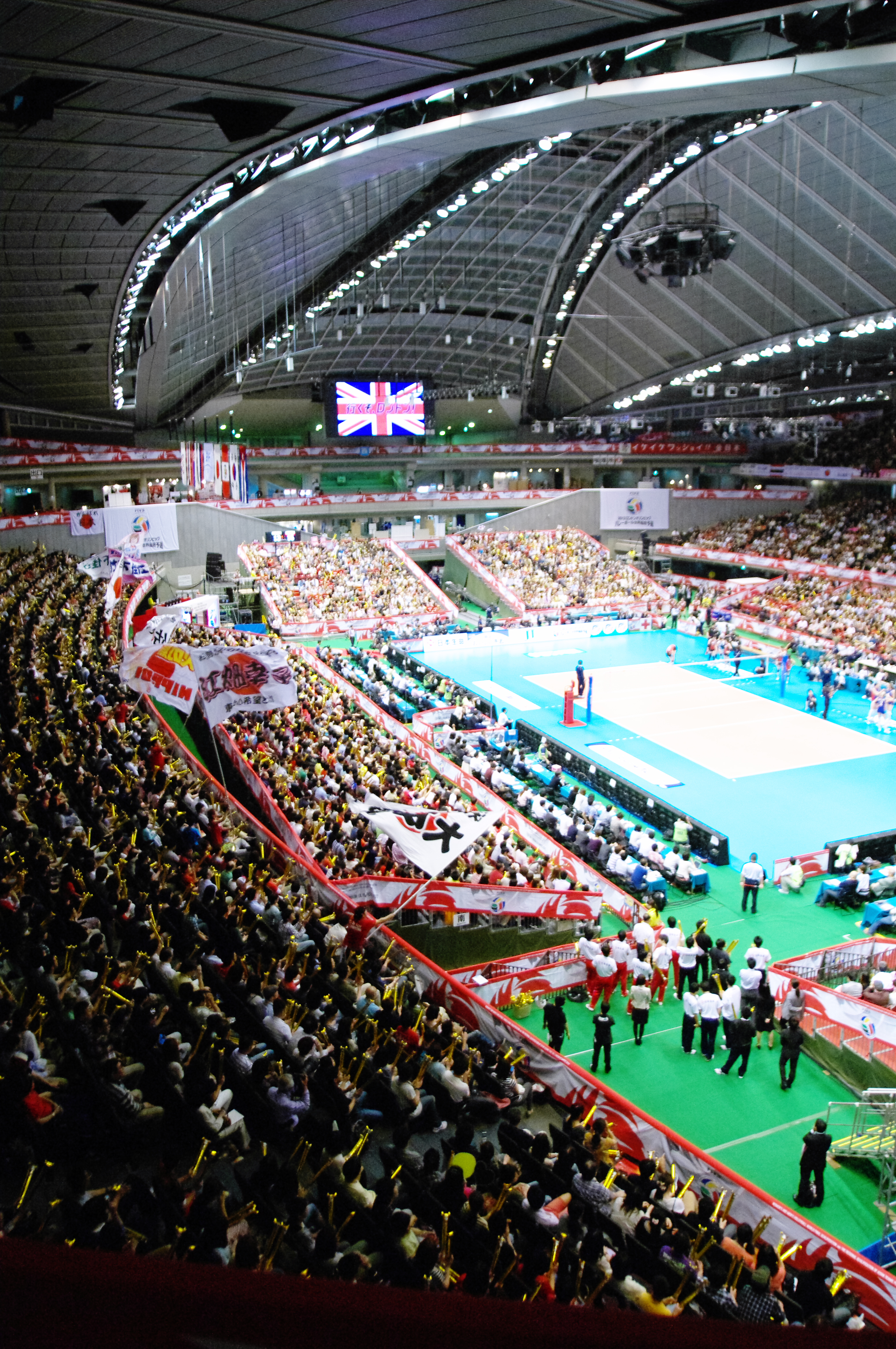

Tokyo Metropolitan Gymnasium (東京体育館, Tōkyō Taiikukan) is a sporting complex in Sendagaya, Shibuya, Tokyo, Japan. Built in 1954 for the World Wrestling Championship, it was also used as the venue for gymnastics at the 1964 Summer Olympics, and hosted the table tennis competition at the 2020 Summer Olympics. The gymnasium was rebuilt to a futuristic design created by Pritzker Prize winner Fumihiko Maki from 1986 to 1990.

The gymnasium is a one-minute walk from Sendagaya Station on the Chūō-Sōbu Line and Kokuritsu Kyogijo Station on the Toei Oedo Line.

== Description and events ==
The main arena includes a large indoor arena that hosts national and international sporting events. The arena holds 10,000 people (6,000 fixed, 4,000 temporary). An incomplete list of events held in the arena include:

- Tokyo Indoor men's tennis
- WTA Toray Pan Pacific Tennis Championships were held every February here, but from 2008 it has been held in the Ariake Coliseum;
- Japan Table Tennis Championships;
- The first two international hosted regular season NBA games between the Phoenix Suns and Utah Jazz on November 2 & 3, 1990.;
- V.League;
- Suntory Cup All Japan School Volleyball Rally;
- Aeon Cup a.k.a. World Rhythmic Gymnastics Club Championships;
- World Full Contact Karate Open Championships; as the Shinkyokushinkai Karate World Open Tournament -held every four years-;
- Miki Prune Super College Volleyball.
- 2007 World Figure Skating Championships
- Final Four of the official 2010 Women's Volleyball World Championship
- 2011 World Artistic Gymnastics Championships
- 2017 TWICE Japan Debut Showcase "Touchdown in Japan"
- 2019 ITTF Team World Cup
- 2021 Olympic Summer Games, Table Tennis
- 2022 &TEAM DEBUT SHOWCASE [First Howling : ME]
- 2023 Taeyeon Concert - 'The ODD of LOVE' in Japan
- Atarashii Gakko! - First Arena Solo Concert 2023 HAMIDASHIHTEIKU

Since 2000, the arena has also been used as a concert venue. The first artist to perform there was the Japanese group Porno Graffitti.

The sub-arena houses an olympic size (50mX20m, eight lanes) swimming pool with seating for 900 people. The Japan Waterpolo Championships is held here. There is also a 25m pool (25mX13m, 6 lanes), an outdoor oval running track; a weight training room, and conference rooms.

Since April 1, 2006, the Tokyo Lifelong Learning and Culture Foundation (東京都生涯学習文化財団), along with Suntory (サントリー株式会社), Tipness (株式会社ティップネス) and O-ence (株式会社オーエンス), manage the gymnasium.

On April 25 and 26, 2015, American singer-songwriter Katy Perry brought The Prismatic World Tour to the venue with two shows.

On July 8 and 9, 2023, South Korean singer Taeyeon brought 2023 Taeyeon Concert - 'The ODD of LOVE' in Japan to the venue with two shows.

On October 28, 2023, Japanese girlgroup Fruits Zipper held their Fruits Zipper Japan Tour 2023 -Autumn- The Parlor of Fruits Zipper Tour Final.

On October 29, 2023, Japanese girlgroup Atarashii Gakko! held their First Arena Solo Concert 2023 HAMIDASHIHTEIKU.

On November 23, 2023, South Korean band F.T. Island held their FTISLAND Autumn Tour 2023 〜F-R-I-E-N-DS〜.

On September 7 and 8, 2024, South Korean singer Doyoung brought 2024 Doyoung Concert 'Dear Youth,' to the venue with two shows.

== Fees ==
From June 1, 2006, the fees for use of the facilities will be:

- training gym/2 hours: 450 yen
- pool/2 hours 600 yen:
- pool (junior high school students and younger)/2 hours: 260 yen
- training gym and pool/2 hours: 1000 yen
- training gym, pool and dance studio/1 day: 2500 yen
- one month pass: 7800 yen

== See also ==
- List of tennis stadiums by capacity
- List of indoor arenas in Japan

Preceded by First venue	Masters Cup; Venue; 1970	Succeeded by Stade Pierre de Coubertin; Paris
