= Lai Chu-long =

Taiwanese gymnast

- 賴 志農
- Alternative name: Pinyin: Lài Zhì-nóng
- Born: 10 March 1942 (age 84) Changhua, Empire of Japan
- Height: 1.67 m (5 ft 6 in)

Gymnastics career
- Discipline: Men's artistic gymnastics
- Country represented: Taiwan

Lai Chu-long (born 10 March 1942) is a Taiwanese gymnast. He competed at the 1964 Summer Olympics and the 1968 Summer Olympics.
