= Lee Gwang-jae (gymnast) =

South Korean gymnast

- 이광재
- Alternative name: Lee Kwang-jae
- Born: 25 September 1941 (age 84)
- Height: 1.59 m (5 ft 3 in)

Gymnastics career
- Discipline: Men's artistic gymnastics
- Country represented: South Korea

Lee Gwang-jae (born 25 September 1941) is a South Korean gymnast who competed in eight events at the 1964 Summer Olympics.

== Sports links ==
- Lee Gwang-jae at Olympedia
