= Kim Chung-tae (gymnast) =

South Korean gymnast

- 김충태
- Alternative name: Kim Chong-tai
- Born: 16 January 1944 (age 82) Keijō, Chōsen, Empire of Japan
- Height: 1.70 m (5 ft 7 in)

Gymnastics career
- Discipline: Men's artistic gymnastics
- Country represented: South Korea

Kim Chung-tae (Korean: 김충태; born 16 January 1944) is a South Korean gymnast. He competed at the 1964 Summer Olympics and the 1968 Summer Olympics.
