= Harald Wigaard =

Norwegian artistic gymnast

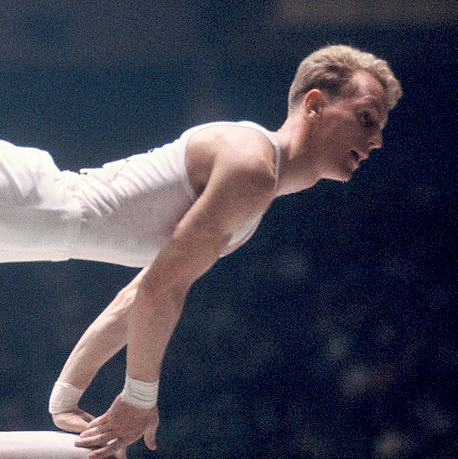
- Wigaard at the 1964 Summer Olympics

Personal information
- Born: 17 May 1944 (age 82) Oslo, Norway
- Height: 1.82 m (6 ft 0 in)

Gymnastics career
- Discipline: Men's artistic gymnastics
- Country represented: Norway
- Club: Oslo Turnforening

Harald Wigaard (born 17 May 1944) is a retired Norwegian gymnast. He competed at the 1964 Summer Olympics in all individual artistic gymnastics events. His best achievement was fifth place on the pommel horse.
