= Gymnastics at the 1964 Summer Olympics =

Coordinates: 35.6797°N 139.7125°E

Gymnastics at the Games of the XVIII Olympiad
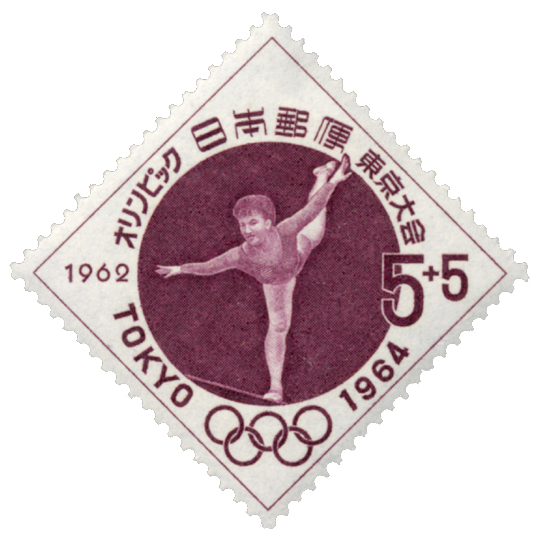
- Gymnastics at the 1964 Olympics on a stamp of Japan
- Venue: Tokyo Metropolitan Gymnasium
- Dates: 18 October – 23 October 1964

At the 1964 Summer Olympics, fourteen different artistic gymnastics events were contested, eight for men and six for women. All events were held at the Tokyo Metropolitan Gymnasium in Tokyo from 18 October through 23 October.

The scoring in all the events was the same, as for gymnastics events at the previous Olympics. The six best gymnasts on the apparatus in the team competition (by sum of two scores—for compulsory and optional routines) qualified for that apparatus finals. Each of the women's events was judged by five judges. The highest and lowest marks were dropped and an average of three remaining ones constituted the score. Each of the men's events were judged by four judges. The highest and lowest marks were dropped and an average of two remaining ones constituted the score.

== Results ==
=== Men's events ===
Games	Gold	Silver	Bronze
Individual all-around	Yukio Endo; Japan	Viktor Lisitsky; Soviet Union; Boris Shakhlin; Soviet Union; Shuji Tsurumi; Japan	none awarded
Team all-around	Japan; Yukio Endo; Takuji Hayata; Takashi Mitsukuri; Takashi Ono; Shuji Tsurumi; Haruhiro Yamashita	Soviet Union; Sergey Diomidov; Viktor Leontev; Viktor Lisitsky; Boris Shakhlin; Yuri Titov; Yuri Tsapenko	United Team of Germany; Siegfried Fülle; Philipp Fürst; Erwin Koppe; Klaus Köste; Günter Lyhs; Peter Weber
Floor exercise	Franco Menichelli; Italy	Yukio Endo; Japan; Viktor Lisitsky; Soviet Union	none awarded
Horizontal bar	Boris Shakhlin; Soviet Union	Yuri Titov; Soviet Union	Miroslav Cerar; Yugoslavia
Parallel bars	Yukio Endo; Japan	Shuji Tsurumi; Japan	Franco Menichelli; Italy
Pommel horse	Miroslav Cerar; Yugoslavia	Shuji Tsurumi; Japan	Yuri Tsapenko; Soviet Union
Rings	Takuji Hayata; Japan	Franco Menichelli; Italy	Boris Shakhlin; Soviet Union
Vault	Haruhiro Yamashita; Japan	Viktor Lisitsky; Soviet Union	Hannu Rantakari; Finland

=== Women's ===
Games	Gold	Silver	Bronze
Individual all-around	Věra Čáslavská; Czechoslovakia	Larisa Latynina; Soviet Union	Polina Astakhova; Soviet Union
Team all-around	Soviet Union; Polina Astakhova; Lyudmila Gromova; Larisa Latynina; Tamara Manina; Elena Volchetskaya; Tamara Zamotaylova	Czechoslovakia; Věra Čáslavská; Marianna Krajčírová; Jana Posnerová; Hana Růžičková; Jaroslava Sedláčková; Adolfína Tkačíková	Japan; Toshiko Aihara; Ginko Chiba; Keiko Ikeda; Taniko Nakamura; Kiyoko Ono; Hiroko Tsuji
Balance beam	Věra Čáslavská; Czechoslovakia	Tamara Manina; Soviet Union	Larisa Latynina; Soviet Union
Floor exercise	Larisa Latynina; Soviet Union	Polina Astakhova; Soviet Union	Anikó Ducza; Hungary
Uneven bars	Polina Astakhova; Soviet Union	Katalin Makray; Hungary	Larisa Latynina; Soviet Union
Vault	Věra Čáslavská; Czechoslovakia	Larisa Latynina; Soviet Union; Birgit Radochla; United Team of Germany	None awarded

== Medal table ==
Rank	Nation	Gold	Silver	Bronze	Total
1	Japan	5	4	1	10
2	Soviet Union	4	10	5	19
3	Czechoslovakia	3	1	0	4
4	Italy	1	1	1	3
5	Yugoslavia	1	0	1	2
6	Hungary	0	1	1	2
6	United Team of Germany	0	1	1	2
8	Finland	0	0	1	1
Totals (8 entries)		14	18	11	43
