= Gymnastics at the 1964 Summer Olympics – Women's vault =

Women's vault at the Games of the XVIII Olympiad
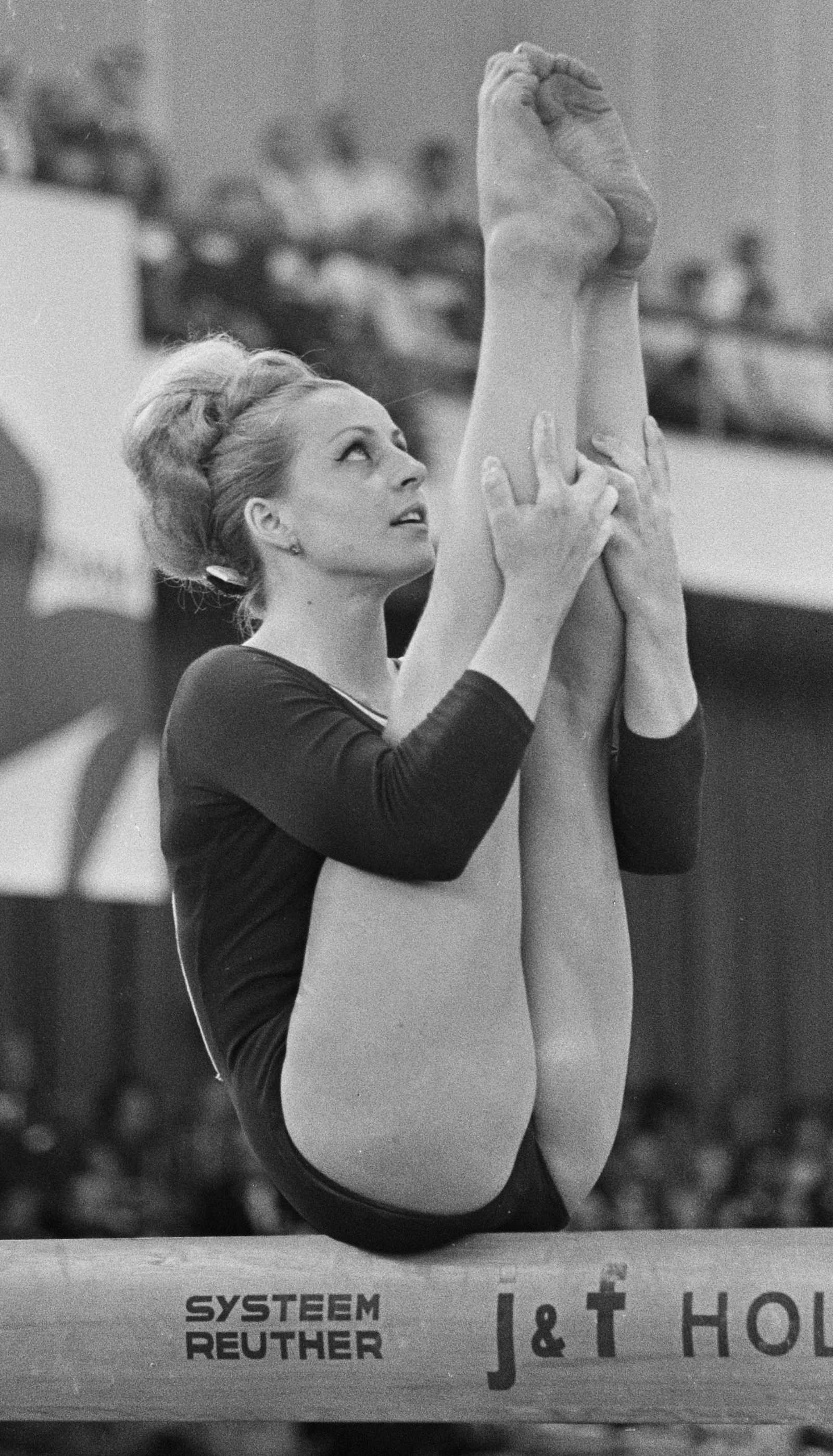
- Gold medalist Věra Čáslavská (1967)
- Venue: Tokyo Metropolitan Gymnasium
- Date: 19 October 1964 (qualifying); 22 October 1964 (final)
- Competitors: 83 from 24 nations
- Winning score: 19.483 pounts

Medalists
1st place, gold medalist(s)		Věra Čáslavská	Czechoslovakia
2nd place, silver medalist(s)		Larisa Latynina	Soviet Union
2nd place, silver medalist(s)		Birgit Radochla	United Team of Germany
3rd place, bronze medalist(s)		not awarded	

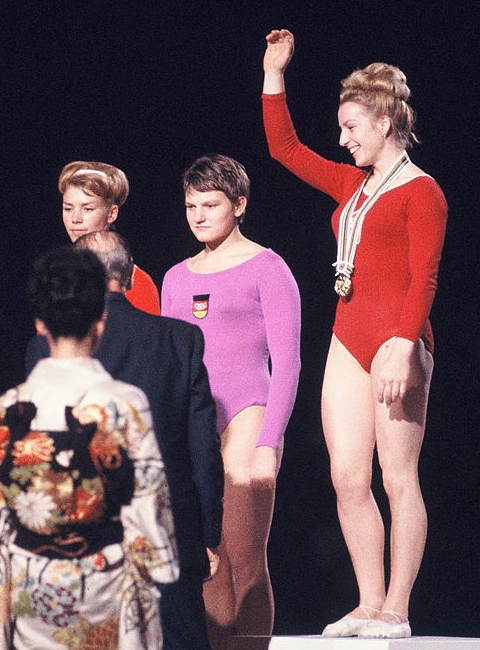
Larisa Latynina, Birgit Radochla, Věra Čáslavská at the podium

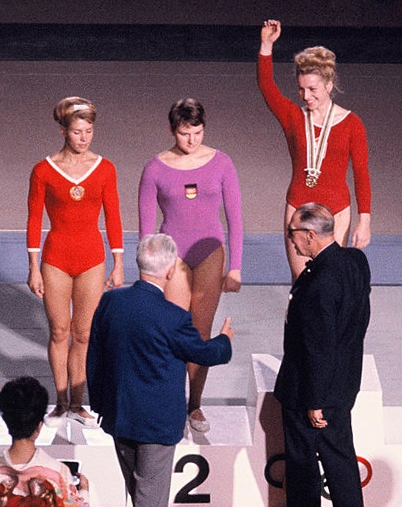
Larisa Latynina, Birgit Radochla, Věra Čáslavská at the podium

The women's vault was a gymnastics event contested as part of the Gymnastics at the 1964 Summer Olympics programme at the Tokyo Metropolitan Gymnasium.

== Medalists ==
Gold	Silver	Silver
Věra Čáslavská; Czechoslovakia	Larisa Latynina; Soviet Union	Birgit Radochla; United Team of Germany

== Results ==
=== Preliminary ===
Each gymnast competed in both compulsory and optional exercises. The score for each was determined by a panel of five judges, with the top and bottom scores being dropped before the remaining three were averaged (and truncated to three decimal places). The two average scores were then summed. This score was also used in calculating both individual all-around and team scores.

The top 6 advanced to the final for the apparatus, keeping half of their preliminary score to be added to their final score.

1.	Věra Čáslavská (TCH)	9.700	9.800	19.500	QF
2.	Birgit Radochla (EUA)	9.766	9.600	19.366	QF
3.	Toshiko Aihara (JPN)	9.633	9.600	19.233	QF
3.	Elena Volchetskaya (URS)	9.633	9.600	19.233	QF
5.	Larisa Latynina (URS)	9.500	9.666	19.166	QF
6.	Ute Starke (EUA)	9.600	9.500	19.100	QF
7.	Polina Astakhova (URS)	9.466	9.566	19.032	
8.	Ingrid Fost (EUA)	9.500	9.500	19.000	
9.	Keiko Ikeda (JPN)	9.466	9.533	18.999	
10.	Ginko Chiba (JPN)	9.466	9.500	18.966	
10.	Kiyoko Ono (JPN)	9.500	9.466	18.966	
10.	Adolfina Tkacikova (TCH)	9.400	9.566	18.966	
13.	Taniko Nakamura (JPN)	9.533	9.400	18.933	
13.	Jaroslava Sedlackova (TCH)	9.433	9.500	18.933	
15.	Marie Krajcirova (TCH)	9.400	9.500	18.900	
16.	Sonia Iovan (ROU)	9.433	9.466	18.899	
16.	Jana Posnerova (TCH)	9.466	9.433	18.899	
18.	D. E. McClements (USA)	9.400	9.466	18.866	
18.	Hana Ruzickova (TCH)	9.433	9.433	18.866	
18.	Malgorzata Wilczek (POL)	9.400	9.466	18.866	
21.	Tolnai Erdosi (HUN)	9.466	9.366	18.832	
22.	Ludmila Gromova (URS)	9.400	9.400	18.800	
23.	Gerda Brylka (POL)	9.366	9.433	18.799	
23.	Laila Egman (SWE)	9.433	9.366	18.799	
23.	Hiroko Tsuji (JPN)	9.466	9.333	18.799	
26.	Tamara Manina (URS)	9.400	9.366	18.766	
26.	Tamara Zamotailova (URS)	9.366	9.400	18.766	
28.	Kathleen Corrigan (USA)	9.400	9.300	18.700	
28.	Dorota Miler (POL)	9.400	9.300	18.700	
30.	Elena Ceampelea (ROU)	9.266	9.400	18.666	
30.	Christel Felgner (EUA)	9.300	9.366	18.666	
30.	Ducza Janosi (HUN)	9.266	9.400	18.666	
33.	Elena Popescu (ROU)	9.266	9.366	18.632	
34.	Ewa Rydell (SWE)	9.366	9.233	18.599	
35.	Veronica Grymonprez (BEL)	9.333	9.233	18.566	
35.	Mak Kovacs (HUN)	9.266	9.300	18.566	
35.	Anna Lundquist (SWE)	9.300	9.266	18.566	
38.	Elzbieta Apostolska (POL)	9.233	9.300	18.533	
38.	Barbara Eustachiewicz (POL)	9.233	9.300	18.533	
40.	Cristina Doboșan (ROU)	9.266	9.266	18.532	
40.	Barbara Stolz (EUA)	9.266	9.266	18.532	
42.	Gail Daley (CAN)	9.300	9.200	18.500	
42.	Atanasia Ionescu (ROU)	9.300	9.200	18.500	
44.	Chung Bong Soon (KOR)	9.233	9.266	18.499	
44.	Ulla Lindstrom (SWE)	9.266	9.233	18.499	
46.	Katalin Muller (HUN)	9.200	9.266	18.466	
47.	Choi Young Sook (KOR)	9.133	9.300	18.433	
47.	Henriette Parzer (AUT)	9.200	9.233	18.433	
47.	Janie Speaks (USA)	9.233	9.200	18.433	
50.	Karin Mannewitz (EUA)	9.266	9.166	18.432	
51.	Liliana Alexandrova (BUL)	9.166	9.233	18.399	
51.	Raina Grigorova (BUL)	9.233	9.166	18.399	
51.	Katalin Makray (HUN)	9.133	9.266	18.399	
54.	Gerola Lindahl (SWE)	9.300	9.066	18.366	
55.	Maria Tressel (HUN)	9.300	9.033	18.333	
56.	Anne-Marie Lambert (SWE)	9.200	9.066	18.266	
56.	Linda Metheny (USA)	9.333	8.933	18.266	
56.	Marie Walther (USA)	9.233	9.033	18.266	
59.	Monica Rutherford (GBR)	9.266	8.966	18.232	
60.	Monique Baelden (FRA)	9.200	9.000	18.200	
60.	Denise Goddard (GBR)	9.300	8.900	18.200	
62.	Valerie Buffham (AUS)	9.166	9.033	18.199	
63.	Esbela Fonseca (POR)	9.133	9.000	18.133	
63.	Evelyne Letourneur (FRA)	9.100	9.033	18.133	
65.	Gizela Niedurna (POL)	8.933	9.133	18.066	
66.	Jacqueline Brisepierre (FRA)	8.933	9.066	17.999	
67.	Lee Duk Boon (KOR)	8.966	9.000	17.966	
68.	Pauline Gardiner (NZL)	8.933	8.833	17.766	
69.	Eira Lehtonen (FIN)	8.766	8.966	17.732	
70.	Gundigmaa Tsagandorj (MGL)	9.066	8.633	17.699	
71.	Emilia Vătăşoiu-Liţă (ROU)	9.166	8.466	17.632	
72.	Theodora Hill (NZL)	8.600	8.933	17.533	
73.	Tuya Yadamsuren (MGL)	9.000	8.433	17.433	
74.	Muriel Grossfeld (USA)	8.800	8.600	17.400	
75.	Valerie Roberts (AUS)	8.966	8.433	17.399	
76.	Jean Spencer (NZL)	8.600	8.500	17.100	
77.	Barbara Cage (AUS)	8.600	8.466	17.066	
78.	Janice Bedford (AUS)	9.000	8.033	17.033	
79.	Barbara Fletcher (AUS)	8.300	8.666	16.966	
80.	Hong Than Kwai (ROC)	7.866	5.566	13.432	
81.	Jamileh Sorouri (IRI)	5.733	6.933	12.666	
82.	Salme Koskinen (FIN)	8.966	—	8.966	
83.	Chai Kuang Tai (ROC)	—	—	0.000	
83.	Maria Floro (PHI)	—	—	0.000	
83.	Lynette Hancock (AUS)	—	—	0.000	
83.	Evelyn Magluyan (PHI)	—	—	0.000	

=== Final ===
Gold	Věra Čáslavská (TCH)	9.750 (1st)	+9.733 (1st)	19.483
Silver	Larisa Latynina (URS)	9.583 (5th)	+9.700 (2nd)	19.283
Silver	Birgit Radochla (EUA)	9.683 (2nd)	+9.600 (4th)	19.283
4.	Toshiko Aihara (JPN)	9.616 (3rd)	+9.666 (3rd)	19.282
5.	Elena Volchetskaya (URS)	9.616 (3rd)	+9.533 (6th)	19.149
6.	Ute Starke (EUA)	9.550 (6th)	+9.566 (5th)	19.116

== Sources ==
- Tokyo Organizing Committee (1964). The Games of the XVIII Olympiad: Tokyo 1964, vol. 2.
