= Gymnastics at the 1964 Summer Olympics – Women's balance beam =

Women's balance beam at the Games of the XVIII Olympiad
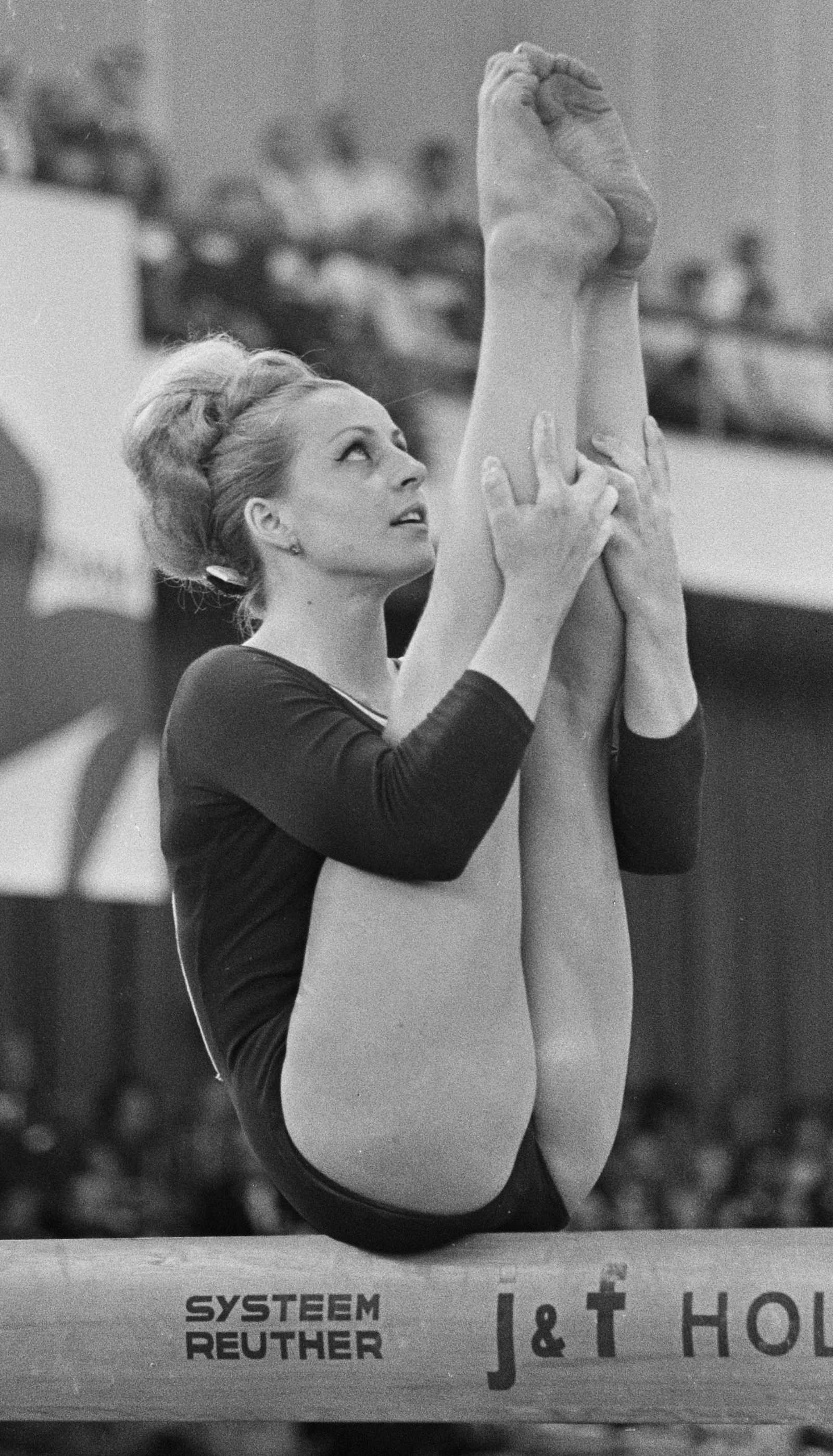
- Gold medalist Věra Čáslavská (1967)

Medalists
1st place, gold medalist(s)		Věra Čáslavská	Czechoslovakia
2nd place, silver medalist(s)		Tamara Manina	Soviet Union
3rd place, bronze medalist(s)		Larisa Latynina	Soviet Union

The women's balance beam was a gymnastics event contested as part of the Gymnastics at the 1964 Summer Olympics programme at the Tokyo Metropolitan Gymnasium.

== Medalists ==
Gold	Silver	Bronze
Věra Čáslavská; Czechoslovakia	Tamara Manina; Soviet Union	Larisa Latynina; Soviet Union

== Results ==
=== Preliminary ===
Each gymnast competed in both compulsory and optional exercises. The score for each was determined by a panel of five judges, with the top and bottom scores being dropped before the remaining three were averaged (and truncated to three decimal places). The two average scores were then summed. This score was also used in calculating both individual all-around and team scores.

The top 6 advanced to the final for the apparatus, keeping half of their preliminary score to be added to their final score.

1.	Věra Čáslavská (TCH)	9.566	9.800	19.366	QF
2.	Tamara Manina (URS)	9.466	9.800	19.266	QF
3.	Larisa Latynina (URS)	9.500	9.733	19.233	QF
4.	Hana Ruzickova (TCH)	9.466	9.766	19.232	QF
5.	Polina Astakhova (URS)	9.400	9.800	19.200	QF
6.	Ikeda Keiko (JPN)	9.466	9.700	19.166	QF
7.	Jaroslava Sedlackova (TCH)	9.400	9.566	18.966	
7.	Elena Volchetskaya (URS)	9.366	9.600	18.966	
9.	Birgit Radochla (EUA)	9.400	9.533	18.933	
10.	Katalin Muller (HUN)	9.400	9.500	18.900	
11.	Ducza Janosi (HUN)	9.433	9.466	18.899	
11.	Elena Popescu (ROU)	9.366	9.533	18.899	
11.	Adolfina Tkacikova (TCH)	9.366	9.533	18.899	
14.	Sonia Iovan (ROU)	9.366	9.500	18.866	
15.	Jana Posnerova (TCH)	9.300	9.500	18.800	
16.	Katalin Makray (HUN)	9.333	9.466	18.799	
17.	Ono Kiyoko (JPN)	9.233	9.500	18.733	
17.	Ute Starke (EUA)	9.333	9.400	18.733	
17.	Maria Tressel (HUN)	9.300	9.433	18.733	
17.	Tamara Zamotailova (URS)	9.200	9.533	18.733	
21.	Gerda Brylka (POL)	9.266	9.466	18.732	
22.	Ludmila Gromova (URS)	9.266	9.433	18.699	
22.	Mak Kovacs (HUN)	9.266	9.433	18.699	
22.	Linda Metheny (USA)	9.166	9.533	18.699	
22.	Malgorzata Wilczek (POL)	9.366	9.333	18.699	
26.	Ingrid Fost (EUA)	9.366	9.300	18.666	
27.	Tsuji Hiroko (JPN)	9.233	9.400	18.633	
28.	Elzbieta Apostolska (POL)	9.166	9.466	18.632	
29.	Aihara Toshiko (JPN)	9.333	9.266	18.599	
29.	Nakamura Taniko (JPN)	9.133	9.466	18.599	
31.	Elena Ceampelea (ROU)	9.166	9.400	18.566	
31.	Marie Krajcirova (TCH)	9.266	9.300	18.566	
31.	Karin Mannewitz (EUA)	9.266	9.300	18.566	
34.	Tolnai Erdosi (HUN)	9.200	9.333	18.533	
35.	Atanasia Ionescu (ROU)	9.166	9.300	18.466	
35.	Dorota Miler (POL)	9.133	9.333	18.466	
35.	Gundigmaa Tsagandorj (MGL)	9.200	9.266	18.466	
38.	Ginko Chiba (JPN)	9.133	9.300	18.433	
39.	Barbara Eustachiewicz (POL)	9.066	9.366	18.432	
39.	Emilia Vătăşoiu-Liţă (ROU)	9.166	9.266	18.432	
41.	Laila Egman (SWE)	9.100	9.300	18.400	
41.	Ewa Rydell (SWE)	9.000	9.400	18.400	
43.	Muriel Grossfeld (USA)	8.933	9.466	18.399	
44.	Monique Baelden (FRA)	9.166	9.200	18.366	
44.	Janie Speaks (USA)	9.066	9.300	18.366	
46.	Christel Felgner (EUA)	9.200	9.150	18.350	
47.	Raina Grigorova (BUL)	9.066	9.266	18.332	
48.	Ulla Lindstrom (SWE)	9.100	9.200	18.300	
49.	Liliana Alexandrova (BUL)	9.000	9.266	18.266	
49.	Veronica Grymonprez (BEL)	9.233	9.033	18.266	
49.	Anna Lundquist (SWE)	9.100	9.166	18.266	
49.	Barbara Stolz (EUA)	9.133	9.133	18.266	
49.	Marie Walther (USA)	8.900	9.366	18.266	
54.	D. E. McClements (USA)	9.000	9.233	18.233	
55.	Jacqueline Brisepierre (FRA)	9.066	9.133	18.199	
55.	Barbara Fletcher (AUS)	8.966	9.233	18.199	
55.	Anne-Marie Lambert (SWE)	9.066	9.133	18.199	
58.	Gerola Lindahl (SWE)	8.966	9.166	18.132	
59.	Kathleen Corrigan (USA)	8.900	9.166	18.066	
59.	Gail Daley (CAN)	9.033	9.033	18.066	
59.	Lee Duk Boon (KOR)	8.966	9.100	18.066	
62.	Janice Bedford (AUS)	8.900	9.133	18.033	
62.	Henriette Parzer (AUT)	8.800	9.233	18.033	
64.	Evelyne Letourneur (FRA)	9.266	8.766	18.032	
65.	Choi Young Sook (KOR)	9.033	8.933	17.966	
66.	Valerie Roberts (AUS)	8.900	9.033	17.933	
67.	Tuya Yadamsuren (MGL)	9.000	8.733	17.733	
68.	Salme Koskinen (FIN)	8.600	9.066	17.666	
68.	Gizela Niedurna (POL)	9.300	8.366	17.666	
70.	Theodora Hill (NZL)	8.800	8.700	17.500	
71.	Esbela Fonseca (POR)	8.666	8.833	17.499	
72.	Cristina Doboșan (ROU)	9.100	8.300	17.400	
73.	Denise Goddard (GBR)	8.666	8.533	17.199	
74.	Eira Lehtonen (FIN)	8.733	8.400	17.133	
75.	Valerie Buffham (AUS)	8.633	8.466	17.099	
76.	Pauline Gardiner (NZL)	8.733	8.066	16.799	
77.	Hong Than Kwai (ROC)	8.800	7.866	16.666	
78.	Monica Rutherford (GBR)	8.633	7.900	16.533	
79.	Jean Spencer (NZL)	8.666	7.300	15.966	
80.	Barbara Cage (AUS)	8.333	7.133	15.466	
81.	Jamileh Sorouri (IRI)	7.233	8.000	15.233	
82.	Chung Bong Soon (KOR)	8.800	6.000	14.800	
83.	Evelyn Magluyan (PHI)	7.666	6.666	14.332	
84.	Chai Kuang Tai (ROC)	—	—	0.000	
84.	Maria Floro (PHI)	—	—	0.000	
84.	Lynette Hancock (AUS)	—	—	0.000	

=== Final ===
Gold	Věra Čáslavská (TCH)	9.683 (1st)	+9.766 (1st)	19.449
Silver	Tamara Manina (URS)	9.633 (2nd)	+9.766 (1st)	19.399
Bronze	Larisa Latynina (URS)	9.616 (3rd)	+9.766 (1st)	19.382
4.	Polina Astakhova (URS)	9.600 (5th)	+9.766 (1st)	19.366
5.	Hana Ruzickova (TCH)	9.616 (3rd)	+9.733 (5th)	19.349
6.	Ikeda Keiko (JPN)	9.583 (6th)	+9.633 (6th)	19.216

== Sources ==
- Tokyo Organizing Committee (1964). The Games of the XVIII Olympiad: Tokyo 1964, vol. 2.
