= Gymnastics at the 1964 Summer Olympics – Women's uneven bars =

Women's uneven bars at the Games of the XVIII Olympiad
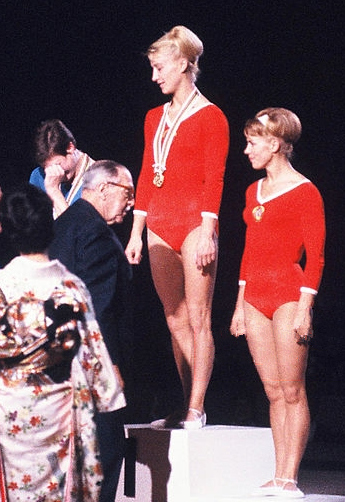
- Katalin Makray, Polina Astakhova and Larisa Latynina on the podium
- Venue: Tokyo Metropolitan Gymnasium
- Date: 19 October 1964 (qualifying); 22 October 1964 (final)
- Competitors: 83 from 24 nations
- Winning total: 19.332

Medalists
1st place, gold medalist(s)		Polina Astakhova	Soviet Union
2nd place, silver medalist(s)		Katalin Makray	Hungary
3rd place, bronze medalist(s)		Larisa Latynina	Soviet Union

The women's uneven bars was a gymnastics event contested as part of the Gymnastics at the 1964 Summer Olympics programme at the Tokyo Metropolitan Gymnasium.

== Results ==
=== Preliminary ===
Each gymnast competed in both compulsory and optional exercises. The score for each was determined by a panel of five judges, with the top and bottom scores being dropped before the remaining three were averaged (and truncated to three decimal places). The two average scores were then summed. This score was also used in calculating both individual all-around and team scores.

The top 6 advanced to the final for the apparatus, keeping half of their preliminary score to be added to their final score.

1.	Věra Čáslavská (TCH)	9.666	9.766	19.432	QF
2.	Polina Astakhova (URS)	9.633	9.700	19.333	QF
3.	Katalin Makray (HUN)	9.566	9.600	19.166	QF
4.	Larisa Latynina (URS)	9.533	9.600	19.133	QF
5.	Toshiko Aihara (JPN)	9.466	9.633	19.099	QF
6.	Tamara Zamotailova (URS)	9.533	9.533	19.066	QF
7.	Hana Ruzickova (TCH)	9.400	9.633	19.033	
8.	Sonia Iovan (ROU)	9.433	9.533	18.966	
8.	Marie Krajcirova (TCH)	9.466	9.500	18.966	
8.	Taniko Nakamura (JPN)	9.400	9.566	18.966	
8.	Kiyoko Ono (JPN)	9.366	9.600	18.966	
8.	Jaroslava Sedlackova (TCH)	9.366	9.600	18.966	
8.	Maria Tressel (HUN)	9.466	9.500	18.966	
14.	Birgit Radochla (EUA)	9.433	9.500	18.933	
15.	Ute Starke (EUA)	9.433	9.433	18.866	
16.	Keiko Ikeda (JPN)	9.466	9.300	18.766	
16.	Elena Popescu (ROU)	9.366	9.400	18.766	
18.	Adolfina Tkacikova (TCH)	9.400	9.333	18.733	
19.	Linda Metheny (USA)	9.400	9.300	18.700	
20.	Karin Mannewitz (EUA)	9.333	9.366	18.699	
21.	Ginko Chiba (JPN)	9.233	9.433	18.666	
21.	Ingrid Fost (EUA)	9.300	9.366	18.666	
21.	Mak Kovacs (HUN)	9.200	9.466	18.666	
24.	Barbara Eustachiewicz (POL)	9.300	9.333	18.633	
24.	Elena Volchetskaya (URS)	9.400	9.233	18.633	
26.	Katalin Muller (HUN)	9.300	9.300	18.600	
27.	Atanasia Ionescu (ROU)	9.166	9.433	18.599	
27.	Emilia Vătăşoiu-Liţă (ROU)	9.233	9.366	18.599	
29.	Ducza Janosi (HUN)	9.166	9.400	18.566	
29.	Hiroko Tsuji (JPN)	9.266	9.300	18.566	
31.	Gerola Lindahl (SWE)	9.300	9.233	18.533	
32.	Evelyne Letourneur (FRA)	9.266	9.266	18.532	
33.	Christel Felgner (EUA)	9.266	9.233	18.499	
34.	Jana Posnerova (TCH)	9.400	9.033	18.433	
35.	Cristina Doboșan (ROU)	9.166	9.266	18.432	
36.	Tolnai Erdosi (HUN)	9.200	9.200	18.400	
37.	Elena Ceampelea (ROU)	9.133	9.266	18.399	
37.	Tamara Manina (URS)	9.433	8.966	18.399	
39.	Barbara Stolz (EUA)	9.100	9.266	18.366	
40.	Anna Lundquist (SWE)	9.200	9.133	18.333	
41.	Anne-Marie Lambert (SWE)	9.166	9.166	18.332	
42.	Raina Grigorova (BUL)	9.133	9.166	18.299	
42.	D. E. McClements (USA)	9.066	9.233	18.299	
42.	Malgorzata Wilczek (POL)	9.033	9.266	18.299	
45.	Gerda Brylka (POL)	9.000	9.233	18.233	
45.	Laila Egman (SWE)	9.400	8.833	18.233	
47.	Monique Baelden (FRA)	9.166	9.066	18.232	
48.	Elzbieta Apostolska (POL)	9.000	9.133	18.133	
48.	Gizela Niedurna (POL)	9.133	9.000	18.133	
50.	Chung Bong Soon (KOR)	9.066	9.066	18.132	
51.	Dorota Miler (POL)	9.100	9.000	18.100	
51.	Ewa Rydell (SWE)	9.300	8.800	18.100	
53.	Veronica Grymonprez (BEL)	9.100	8.966	18.066	
54.	Choi Young Sook (KOR)	8.933	9.100	18.033	
54.	Kathleen Corrigan (USA)	8.933	9.100	18.033	
54.	Ludmila Gromova (URS)	9.500	8.533	18.033	
57.	Gail Daley (CAN)	8.933	9.000	17.933	
57.	Gundigmaa Tsagandorj (MGL)	9.033	8.900	17.933	
59.	Ulla Lindstrom (SWE)	8.833	8.900	17.733	
60.	Salme Koskinen (FIN)	8.866	8.866	17.732	
61.	Liliana Alexandrova (BUL)	8.633	9.033	17.666	
62.	Muriel Grossfeld (USA)	9.266	8.133	17.399	
62.	Tuya Yadamsuren (MGL)	8.833	8.566	17.399	
64.	Eira Lehtonen (FIN)	8.833	8.500	17.333	
65.	Henriette Parzer (AUT)	8.333	8.966	17.299	
66.	Marie Walther (USA)	9.366	7.500	16.866	
67.	Barbara Fletcher (AUS)	8.233	8.600	16.833	
68.	Jacqueline Brisepierre (FRA)	9.100	7.666	16.766	
69.	Esbela Fonseca (POR)	8.066	8.633	16.699	
69.	Janie Speaks (USA)	8.533	8.166	16.699	
71.	Lee Duk Boon (KOR)	8.000	8.600	16.600	
72.	Valerie Roberts (AUS)	8.000	8.466	16.466	
73.	Valerie Buffham (AUS)	7.966	8.466	16.432	
74.	Pauline Gardiner (NZL)	8.133	8.266	16.399	
75.	Jean Spencer (NZL)	7.933	8.400	16.333	
76.	Denise Goddard (GBR)	8.100	8.166	16.266	
77.	Theodora Hill (NZL)	8.400	7.833	16.233	
78.	Janice Bedford (AUS)	7.833	8.133	15.966	
79.	Monica Rutherford (GBR)	7.200	8.200	15.400	
80.	Barbara Cage (AUS)	7.366	7.633	14.999	
81.	Hong Than Kwai (ROC)	4.500	6.933	11.433	
82.	Jamileh Sorouri (IRI)	3.000	5.000	8.000	
83.	Chai Kuang Tai (ROC)	—	—	0.000	
83.	Maria Floro (PHI)	—	—	0.000	
83.	Lynette Hancock (AUS)	—	—	0.000	
83.	Evelyn Magluyan (PHI)	—	—	0.000	

=== Final ===
Gold	Polina Astakhova (URS)	9.666 (2nd)	+9.666 (1st)	19.332
Silver	Katalin Makray (HUN)	9.583 (3rd)	+9.633 (2nd)	19.216
Bronze	Larisa Latynina (URS)	9.566 (4th)	+9.633 (2nd)	19.199
4.	Toshiko Aihara (JPN)	9.549 (5th)	+9.233 (4th)	18.782
5.	Věra Čáslavská (TCH)	9.716 (1st)	+8.700 (5th)	18.416
6.	Tamara Zamotailova (URS)	9.533 (6th)	+8.300 (6th)	17.833

== Sources ==
- Tokyo Organizing Committee (1964). The Games of the XVIII Olympiad: Tokyo 1964, vol. 2.
