= Gymnastics at the 1964 Summer Olympics – Women's floor exercise =

Women's floor exercise at the Games of the XVIII Olympiad
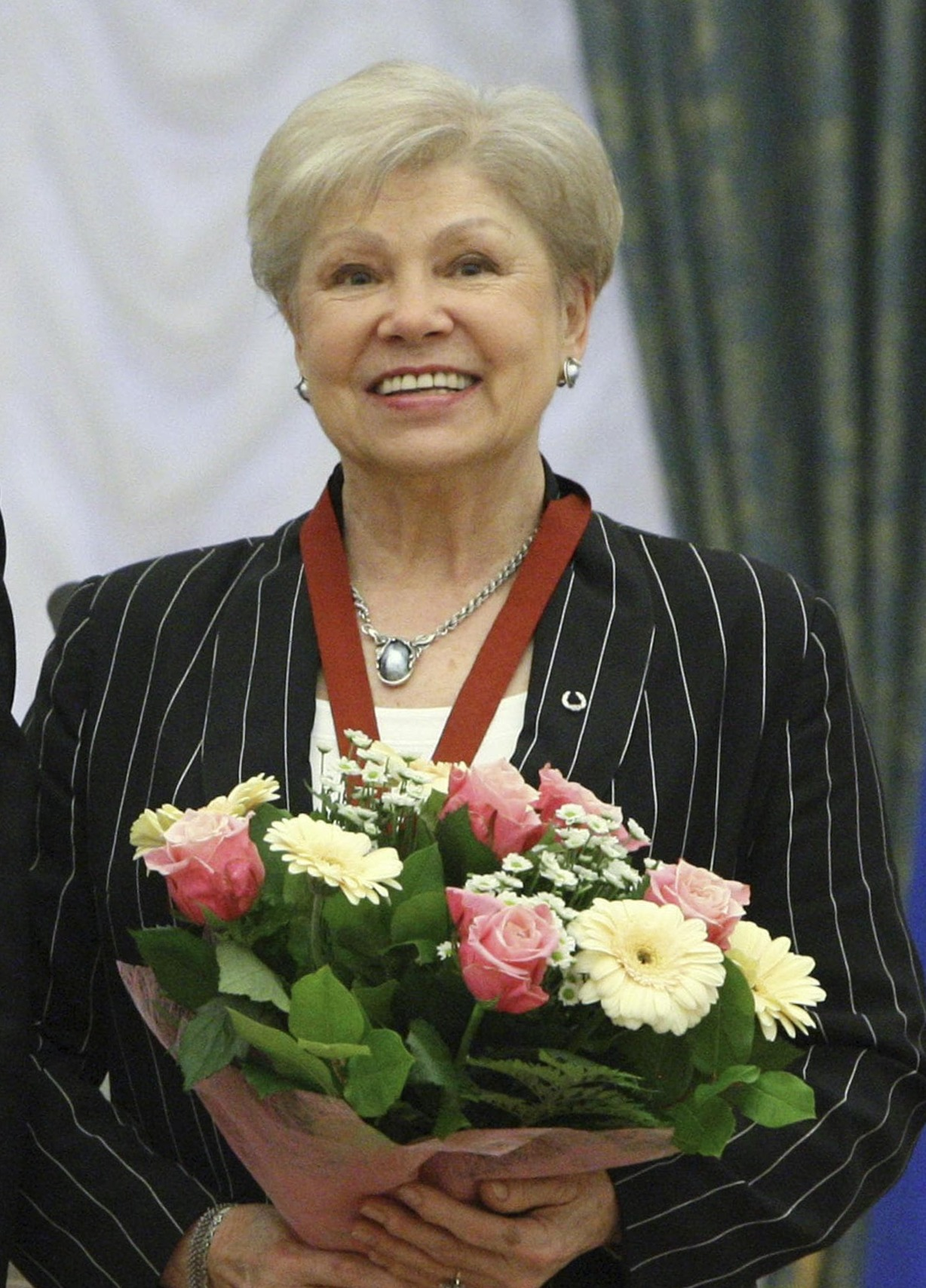
- Gold medalist Larisa Latynina (2010)

Medalists
| 1st place, gold medalist(s) | | Larisa Latynina | Soviet Union |
| 2nd place, silver medalist(s) | | Polina Astakhova | Soviet Union |
| 3rd place, bronze medalist(s) | | Aniko Ducza | Hungary |

The women's floor exercise was a gymnastics event contested as part of the Gymnastics at the 1964 Summer Olympics programme at the Tokyo Metropolitan Gymnasium.

== Results ==
=== Preliminary ===
Each gymnast competed in both compulsory and optional exercises. The score for each was determined by a panel of five judges, with the highest and lowest scores being dropped before the remaining three were averaged (and truncated to three decimal places). The two average scores were then summed. This score was also used in calculating both individual all-around and team scores.

The top six advanced to the finals for the apparatus, retaining half of their preliminary score to be added to their final score.

| 1. | Larisa Latynina (URS) | 9.666 | 9.800 | 19.466 | QF |
| 2. | Polina Astakhova (URS) | 9.700 | 9.700 | 19.400 | QF |
| 3. | Věra Čáslavská (TCH) | 9.500 | 9.766 | 19.266 | QF |
| 4. | Aniko Ducza (HUN) | 9.600 | 9.600 | 19.200 | QF |
| 5. | Birgit Radochla (EUA) | 9.566 | 9.633 | 19.199 | QF |
| 6. | Ingrid Fost (EUA) | 9.533 | 9.600 | 19.133 | QF |
| 7. | Ikeda Keiko (JPN) | 9.500 | 9.600 | 19.100 | |
| 8. | Aihara Toshiko (JPN) | 9.533 | 9.533 | 19.066 | |
| 9. | Ono Kiyoko (JPN) | 9.400 | 9.600 | 19.000 | |
| 10. | Katalin Makray (HUN) | 9.466 | 9.500 | 18.966 | |
| 10. | Tamara Manina (URS) | 9.500 | 9.466 | 18.966 | |
| 10. | Hana Ruzickova (TCH) | 9.400 | 9.566 | 18.966 | |
| 13. | Ute Starke (EUA) | 9.500 | 9.433 | 18.933 | |
| 13. | Elena Volchetskaya (URS) | 9.433 | 9.500 | 18.933 | |
| 15. | Maria Tressel (HUN) | 9.500 | 9.400 | 18.900 | |
| 16. | Ludmila Gromova (URS) | 9.300 | 9.566 | 18.866 | |
| 16. | Muriel Grossfeld (USA) | 9.433 | 9.433 | 18.866 | |
| 18. | Elena Popescu (ROU) | 9.300 | 9.533 | 18.833 | |
| 18. | Tamara Zamotailova (URS) | 9.400 | 9.433 | 18.833 | |
| 20. | Gerda Brylka (POL) | 9.266 | 9.533 | 18.799 | |
| 21. | Jaroslava Sedlackova (TCH) | 9.300 | 9.433 | 18.733 | |
| 21. | Adolfina Tkacikova (TCH) | 9.333 | 9.400 | 18.733 | |
| 23. | Nakamura Taniko (JPN) | 9.300 | 9.400 | 18.700 | |
| 24. | Malgorzata Wilczek (POL) | 9.333 | 9.366 | 18.699 | |
| 25. | Sonia Iovan (ROU) | 9.266 | 9.400 | 18.666 | |
| 25. | Mak Kovacs (HUN) | 9.400 | 9.266 | 18.666 | |
| 25. | Karin Mannewitz (EUA) | 9.366 | 9.300 | 18.666 | |
| 25. | D. E. McClements (USA) | 9.333 | 9.333 | 18.666 | |
| 29. | Anna Lundquist (SWE) | 9.300 | 9.333 | 18.633 | |
| 29. | Jana Posnerova (TCH) | 9.300 | 9.333 | 18.633 | |
| 29. | Marie Walther (USA) | 9.300 | 9.333 | 18.633 | |
| 32. | Ginko Chiba (JPN) | 9.300 | 9.300 | 18.600 | |
| 33. | Barbara Eustachiewicz (POL) | 9.066 | 9.533 | 18.599 | |
| 33. | Katalin Muller (HUN) | 9.333 | 9.266 | 18.599 | |
| 33. | Tsuji Hiroko (JPN) | 9.233 | 9.366 | 18.599 | |
| 36. | Elzbieta Apostolska (POL) | 9.200 | 9.333 | 18.533 | |
| 37. | Gizela Niedurna (POL) | 9.200 | 9.300 | 18.500 | |
| 37. | Ewa Rydell (SWE) | 9.200 | 9.300 | 18.500 | |
| 39. | Christel Felgner (EUA) | 9.333 | 9.166 | 18.499 | |
| 40. | Tolnai Erdosi (HUN) | 9.266 | 9.200 | 18.466 | |
| 40. | Marie Krajcirova (TCH) | 9.200 | 9.266 | 18.466 | |
| 42. | Evelyne Letourneur (FRA) | 9.233 | 9.166 | 18.399 | |
| 43. | Veronica Grymonprez (BEL) | 9.233 | 9.133 | 18.366 | |
| 43. | Ulla Lindstrom (SWE) | 9.233 | 9.133 | 18.366 | |
| 43. | Janie Speaks (USA) | 9.066 | 9.300 | 18.366 | |
| 46. | Linda Metheny (USA) | 9.133 | 9.200 | 18.333 | |
| 47. | Laila Egman (SWE) | 9.166 | 9.166 | 18.332 | |
| 47. | Emilia Vătăşoiu-Liţă (ROU) | 9.066 | 9.266 | 18.332 | |
| 49. | Barbara Stolz (EUA) | 9.200 | 9.066 | 18.266 | |
| 50. | Elena Ceampelea (ROU) | 9.200 | 9.000 | 18.200 | |
| 51. | Dorota Miler (POL) | 9.033 | 9.166 | 18.199 | |
| 52. | Monique Baelden (FRA) | 9.133 | 9.033 | 18.166 | |
| 53. | Cristina Doboșan (ROU) | 9.000 | 9.133 | 18.133 | |
| 53. | Raina Grigorova (BUL) | 9.033 | 9.100 | 18.133 | |
| 53. | Atanasia Ionescu (ROU) | 9.000 | 9.133 | 18.133 | |
| 56. | Henriette Parzer (AUT) | 9.066 | 9.066 | 18.132 | |
| 57. | Jacqueline Brisepierre (FRA) | 9.066 | 9.033 | 18.099 | |
| 58. | Liliana Alexandrova (BUL) | 8.900 | 9.133 | 18.033 | |
| 59. | Kathleen Corrigan (USA) | 8.966 | 9.066 | 18.032 | |
| 60. | Anne-Marie Lambert (SWE) | 8.933 | 9.066 | 17.999 | |
| 61. | Gail Daley (CAN) | 8.866 | 9.100 | 17.966 | |
| 62. | Janice Bedford (AUS) | 9.033 | 8.916 | 17.949 | |
| 63. | Eira Lehtonen (FIN) | 8.900 | 9.033 | 17.933 | |
| 64. | Monica Rutherford (GBR) | 8.800 | 9.100 | 17.900 | |
| 65. | Gerola Lindahl (SWE) | 8.766 | 8.966 | 17.732 | |
| 66. | Valerie Buffham (AUS) | 8.700 | 9.000 | 17.700 | |
| 66. | Denise Goddard (GBR) | 8.600 | 9.100 | 17.700 | |
| 68. | Theodora Hill (NZL) | 8.766 | 8.933 | 17.699 | |
| 69. | Choi Young Sook (KOR) | 8.566 | 9.066 | 17.632 | |
| 69. | Barbara Fletcher (AUS) | 8.866 | 8.766 | 17.632 | |
| 71. | Chung Bong Soon (KOR) | 8.600 | 9.000 | 17.600 | |
| 72. | Lee Duk Boon (KOR) | 8.566 | 9.000 | 17.566 | |
| 73. | Gundigmaa Tsagandorj (MGL) | 8.633 | 8.900 | 17.533 | |
| 74. | Salme Koskinen (FIN) | 8.666 | 8.833 | 17.499 | |
| 75. | Valerie Roberts (AUS) | 8.800 | 8.666 | 17.466 | |
| 76. | Esbela Fonseca (POR) | 8.566 | 8.866 | 17.432 | |
| 77. | Tuya Yadamsuren (MGL) | 8.800 | 8.600 | 17.400 | |
| 78. | Barbara Cage (AUS) | 8.666 | 8.733 | 17.399 | |
| 79. | Pauline Gardiner (NZL) | 8.633 | 8.733 | 17.366 | |
| 79. | Hong Than Kwai (ROC) | 8.700 | 8.666 | 17.366 | |
| 81. | Jean Spencer (NZL) | 8.366 | 8.600 | 16.966 | |
| 82. | Evelyn Magluyan (PHI) | 6.866 | 8.266 | 15.132 | |
| 83. | Jamileh Sorouri (IRI) | 6.500 | 7.533 | 14.033 | |
| 84. | Chai Kuang Tai (ROC) | — | — | 0.000 | |
| 84. | Maria Floro (PHI) | — | — | 0.000 | |
| 84. | Lynette Hancock (AUS) | — | — | 0.000 | |

=== Final ===
| Gold | Larisa Latynina (URS) | 9.733 (1st) | +9.866 (1st) | 19.599 |
| Silver | Polina Astakhova (URS) | 9.700 (2nd) | +9.800 (2nd) | 19.500 |
| Bronze | Anikó Ducza (HUN) | 9.600 (4th) | +9.700 (3rd) | 19.300 |
| 4. | Birgit Radochla (EUA) | 9.599 (5th) | +9.700 (3rd) | 19.299 |
| 5. | Ingrid Fost (EUA) | 9.566 (6th) | +9.700 (3rd) | 19.266 |
| 6. | Věra Čáslavská (TCH) | 9.633 (3rd) | +9.466 (6th) | 19.099 |

== Sources ==
- Tokyo Organizing Committee (1964). The Games of the XVIII Olympiad: Tokyo 1964, vol. 2.
