= List of gymnasts at the 1964 Summer Olympics =

This is a list of the gymnasts who represented their country at the 1964 Summer Olympics in Tokyo from 10 to 24 October 1964. Only one discipline, artistic gymnastics, was included in the Games.

== Female artistic gymnasts ==
| | Name | Country | Date of birth (Age) |
|---|---|---|---|
| Youngest competitor | Jamileh Sorouri | Iran | 8 March 1950 (aged 14) |
| Oldest competitor | Rayna Grigorova | Bulgaria | 25 July 1931 (aged 33) |

| NOC | Name | Date of birth (Age) | Hometown |
|---|---|---|---|
| Australia | Jan Bedford | 15 May 1945 (aged 19) | |
| Australia | Val Buffham | 28 June 1943 (aged 21) | Perth, Western Australia |
| Australia | Barbara Cage | 26 September 1941 (aged 23) | Southport, Queensland |
| Australia | Barbara Fletcher | 15 May 1943 (aged 21) | |
| Australia | Val Roberts | 10 July 1938 (aged 26) | Ballarat, Victoria |
| Austria | Henriette Parzer | 28 August 1943 (aged 21) | Vienna, Austria |
| Belgium | Veronica Grymonprez | 17 January 1944 (aged 20) | Berlin, Germany |
| Bulgaria | Liliana Aleksandrova | 26 February 1943 (aged 21) | |
| Bulgaria | Rayna Grigorova | 25 July 1931 (aged 33) | Varna, Bulgaria |
| Canada | Gail Daley | 5 April 1946 (aged 18) | Saskatoon, Saskatchewan |
| Czechoslovakia | Věra Čáslavská | 3 May 1942 (aged 22) | Prague, Czechoslovakia |
| Czechoslovakia | Marianna Némethová-Krajčírová | 1 June 1948 (aged 16) | Košice, Czechoslovakia |
| Czechoslovakia | Jana Posnerová | 9 January 1945 (aged 19) | Nové Sady, Czechoslovakia |
| Czechoslovakia | Hana Růžičková | 18 February 1941 (aged 23) | Třebotov, Czechoslovakia |
| Czechoslovakia | Jaroslava Sedláčková | 21 June 1946 (aged 18) | Lenešice, Czechoslovakia |
| Czechoslovakia | Adolfína Tkačíková | 19 April 1939 (aged 25) | Petřkovice, Czechoslovakia |
| Finland | Salme Koskinen | 20 April 1944 (aged 20) | Turku, Finland |
| Finland | Eira Lehtonen | 22 January 1939 (aged 25) | Turku, Finland |
| France | Monique Baelden | 10 April 1938 (aged 26) | Harnes, France |
| France | Jacqueline Brisepierre | 30 October 1945 (aged 18) | Montceau-les-Mines, France |
| France | Evelyne Letourneur | 13 September 1947 (aged 17) | Vernon, France |
| United Team of Germany | Christel Felgner | 25 July 1942 (aged 22) | Halle, Germany |
| United Team of Germany | Ingrid Föst | 9 November 1934 (aged 29) | Potsdam, Germany |
| United Team of Germany | Karin Mannewitz | 15 November 1939 (aged 24) | Rudolstadt, Germany |
| United Team of Germany | Birgit Radochla | 31 January 1945 (aged 19) | Döbern, Germany |
| United Team of Germany | Ute Starke | 14 January 1939 (aged 25) | Eisleben, Germany |
| United Team of Germany | Barbara Stolz | 28 June 1941 (aged 23) | Döbeln, Germany |
| Great Britain | Denise Goddard | 20 April 1945 (aged 19) | Cardiff, Wales |
| Great Britain | Monica Rutherford | 29 March 1944 (aged 20) | Sunderland, England |
| Hungary | Anikó Ducza | 8 August 1942 (aged 22) | Budapest, Hungary |
| Hungary | Gyöngyi Mák-Kovács | 21 February 1940 (aged 24) | Budapest, Hungary |
| Hungary | Katalin Makray | 5 April 1945 (aged 19) | Vasvár, Hungary |
| Hungary | Katalin Müller | 13 September 1943 (aged 21) | Budapest, Hungary |
| Hungary | Márta Tolnai-Erdős | 23 August 1941 (aged 23) | Pécs, Hungary |
| Hungary | Mária Tressel | 29 July 1946 (aged 18) | Budapest, Hungary |
| Iran | Jamileh Sorouri | 8 March 1950 (aged 14) | |
| Japan | Toshiko Aihara | 3 June 1939 (aged 25) | Mihara, Japan |
| Japan | Ginko Chiba | 25 February 1938 (aged 26) | Akita Prefecture, Japan |
| Japan | Keiko Ikeda | 11 November 1933 (aged 30) | Mihara, Japan |
| Japan | Taniko Nakamura | 23 March 1943 (aged 21) | Niigata Prefecture, Japan |
| Japan | Kiyoko Ono | 4 February 1936 (aged 28) | Iwanuma, Japan |
| Japan | Hiroko Tsuji | 29 November 1938 (aged 25) | Ishikawa Prefecture, Japan |
| Mongolia | Tsagaandorjiin Gündegmaa | 6 February 1946 (aged 18) | Övörkhangai Province, Mongolia |
| Mongolia | Yadamsürengiin Tuyaa | 6 November 1947 (aged 16) | Ulaanbaatar, Mongolia |
| New Zealand | Pauline Gardiner | 11 October 1945 (aged 18) | Cambridge, New Zealand |
| New Zealand | Theodora Hill | 11 January 1946 (aged 18) | Hāwera, New Zealand |
| New Zealand | Jean Spencer | 10 June 1944 (aged 20) | Woodford, England |
| Philippines | Evelyn Magluyan | 5 September 1944 (aged 20) | |
| Poland | Elżbieta Apostolska | 28 March 1944 (aged 20) | Kraków, Poland |
| Poland | Gerda Bryłka | 12 August 1941 (aged 23) | Świętochłowice, Poland |
| Poland | Barbara Eustachiewicz | 5 November 1938 (aged 25) | Katowice, Poland |
| Poland | Dorota Miler | 1 February 1944 (aged 20) | Nowy Bytom, Poland |
| Poland | Gizela Niedurna | 31 January 1939 (aged 25) | Nowy Bytom, Poland |
| Poland | Małgorzata Wilczek | 9 March 1944 (aged 20) | Świętochłowice, Poland |
| Portugal | Esbela da Fonseca | 26 July 1942 (aged 22) | Lisbon, Portugal |
| Romania | Elena Ceampelea | 3 March 1947 (aged 17) | Ploiești, Romania |
| Romania | Cristina Doboșan | 22 May 1943 (aged 21) | Reșița, Romania |
| Romania | Atanasia Ionescu | 19 March 1935 (aged 29) | Ploiești, Romania |
| Romania | Sonia Iovan | 29 September 1935 (aged 29) | Cluj-Napoca, Romania |
| Romania | Elena Leușteanu | 4 July 1935 (aged 29) | Chernivtsi, Ukrainian SSR |
| Romania | Emilia Vătășoiu | 20 October 1933 (aged 30) | Câineni, Romania |
| South Korea | Choi Yeong-suk | 14 May 1947 (aged 17) | |
| South Korea | Jeong Bong-sun | 27 May 1945 (aged 19) | |
| South Korea | Lee Deok-bun | 12 December 1945 (aged 18) | |
| Soviet Union | Polina Astakhova | 30 October 1936 (aged 27) | Zaporizhzhia, Ukrainian SSR |
| Soviet Union | Lyudmila Gromova | 4 November 1942 (aged 21) | Miass, Russian SFSR |
| Soviet Union | Larisa Latynina | 27 December 1934 (aged 29) | Kherson, Ukrainian SSR |
| Soviet Union | Tamara Manina | 5 September 1934 (aged 30) | Petrozavodsk, Russian SFSR |
| Soviet Union | Elena Volchetskaya | 4 December 1944 (aged 19) | Grodno, Byelorussian SSR |
| Soviet Union | Tamara Zamotaylova | 11 May 1939 (aged 25) | Mishenka, Russian SFSR |
| Sweden | Solveig Egman-Andersson | 6 January 1942 (aged 22) | Arvika, Sweden |
| Sweden | Anne-Marie Lambert | 2 June 1945 (aged 19) | Bromma, Sweden |
| Sweden | Gerola Lindahl | 20 July 1943 (aged 21) | Stockholm, Sweden |
| Sweden | Ulla Lindström | 17 April 1943 (aged 21) | Huskvarna, Sweden |
| Sweden | Marie Lundqvist | 21 February 1947 (aged 17) | Västerås, Sweden |
| Sweden | Ewa Rydell | 26 February 1942 (aged 22) | Gothenburg, Sweden |
| Taiwan | Hong Tai-Kwai | 8 December 1946 (aged 17) | Pingtung, Taiwan |
| United States | Kathleen Corrigan | 3 March 1945 (aged 19) | Quincy, Massachusetts |
| United States | Muriel Grossfeld | 7 October 1940 (aged 24) | Speedway, Indiana |
| United States | Dorothy McClements | 31 December 1944 (aged 19) | Winnipeg, Manitoba |
| United States | Linda Metheny | 12 August 1947 (aged 17) | Olney, Illinois |
| United States | Janie Speaks | 8 June 1948 (aged 16) | Oklahoma City, Oklahoma |
| United States | Marie Walther | 8 December 1944 (aged 19) | Cleveland, Ohio |

== Male artistic gymnasts ==
| | Name | Country | Date of birth (Age) |
|---|---|---|---|
| Youngest competitor | Makoto Sakamoto | United States | 8 April 1947 (aged 17) |
| Oldest competitor | Josy Stoffel | Luxembourg | 27 June 1928 (aged 36) |

| NOC | Name | Date of birth (Age) | Hometown |
|---|---|---|---|
| Algeria | Mohamed Lazhari | 28 April 1938 (aged 26) | Algiers, Algeria |
| Argentina | Carlos Pizzini | 25 November 1941 (aged 22) | |
| Australia | Graham Bond | 6 May 1937 (aged 27) | Wondai, Queensland |
| Australia | Barry Cheales | 7 February 1943 (aged 21) | |
| Australia | Benjamin de Roo | 11 February 1940 (aged 24) | Enschede, Netherlands |
| Australia | Marcus Faulks | 3 August 1937 (aged 27) | |
| Australia | Douglas MacLennan | 2 November 1939 (aged 24) | |
| Australia | Frederick Trainer | 5 March 1941 (aged 23) | |
| Bulgaria | Todor Bachvarov | 8 January 1936 (aged 28) | Yambol, Bulgaria |
| Bulgaria | Ljuben Christov | 15 July 1935 (aged 29) | Sofia, Bulgaria |
| Bulgaria | Velik Kapsazov | 15 April 1935 (aged 29) | Asenovgrad, Bulgaria |
| Bulgaria | Todor Kondev | 16 November 1938 (aged 25) | |
| Bulgaria | Georgi Mirchev | 3 June 1939 (aged 25) | Sofia, Bulgaria |
| Bulgaria | Nicola Prodanov | 26 May 1940 (aged 24) | Burgas, Bulgaria |
| Canada | Richard Kihn | 15 August 1935 (aged 29) | Alzenau, Germany |
| Canada | Gilbert Larose | 13 September 1942 (aged 22) | Montreal, Quebec |
| Canada | Wilhelm Weiler | 1 March 1936 (aged 28) | Rastatt, Germany |
| Cuba | Carlos García | 11 September 1942 (aged 22) | |
| Cuba | Andrés González | 4 December 1935 (aged 28) | |
| Cuba | Pablo Hernández | 1 November 1944 (aged 19) | |
| Cuba | Félix Padrón | 1 December 1936 (aged 27) | |
| Cuba | Héctor Ramírez | 31 January 1943 (aged 21) | Havana, Cuba |
| Cuba | Octavio Suárez | 26 July 1944 (aged 20) | Havana, Cuba |
| Czechoslovakia | Pavel Gajdoš | 1 October 1936 (aged 28) | Velykyi Bereznyi, Ukrainian SSR |
| Czechoslovakia | Karel Klečka | 1 August 1936 (aged 28) | Ostrava, Czechoslovakia |
| Czechoslovakia | Přemysl Krbec | 28 January 1940 (aged 24) | Litovel, Czechoslovakia |
| Czechoslovakia | Václav Kubička | 28 September 1939 (aged 25) | Písek, Czechoslovakia |
| Czechoslovakia | Bohumil Mudřík | 3 December 1941 (aged 22) | Zlín, Czechoslovakia |
| Czechoslovakia | Ladislav Pazdera | 6 December 1936 (aged 27) | Radostice, Czechoslovakia |
| Egypt | Mohamed Ibrahim | 4 August 1942 (aged 22) | |
| Finland | Eugen Ekman | 27 October 1937 (aged 26) | Vaasa, Finland |
| Finland | Kauko Heikkinen | 3 March 1938 (aged 26) | Pielisjärvi, Finland |
| Finland | Raimo Heinonen | 29 May 1935 (aged 29) | Turku, Finland |
| Finland | Otto Kestola | 20 May 1936 (aged 28) | Vyborg, Finland |
| Finland | Olli Laiho | 18 February 1943 (aged 21) | Savonlinna, Finland |
| Finland | Hannu Rantakari | 8 January 1939 (aged 25) | Tampere, Finland |
| France | Michel Bouchonnet | 17 July 1940 (aged 24) | Reuilly, France |
| France | Bernard Fauqueux | 2 September 1938 (aged 26) | Vernon, France |
| France | Christian Guiffroy | 21 January 1941 (aged 23) | Toulouse, France |
| United Team of Germany | Siegfried Fülle | 6 October 1939 (aged 25) | Greiz, Germany |
| United Team of Germany | Philipp Fürst | 8 November 1936 (aged 27) | Oppau, Germany |
| United Team of Germany | Erwin Koppe | 29 March 1938 (aged 26) | Rosenheim, Germany |
| United Team of Germany | Klaus Köste | 27 February 1943 (aged 21) | Frankfurt an der Oder, Germany |
| United Team of Germany | Günter Lyhs | 20 April 1934 (aged 30) | Sulimy, Poland |
| United Team of Germany | Peter Weber | 22 December 1938 (aged 25) | Finsterwalde, Germany |
| Great Britain | John Mulhall | 18 August 1938 (aged 26) | Cardiff, Wales |
| Great Britain | Jack Pancott | 1 April 1933 (aged 31) | Farnborough, England |
| Hungary | István Aranyos | 25 April 1942 (aged 22) | Budapest, Hungary |
| Hungary | Rajmund Csányi | 22 April 1936 (aged 28) | Bucharest, Romania |
| Hungary | Győző Cser | 29 October 1942 (aged 21) | Budapest, Hungary |
| Hungary | András Lelkes | 22 December 1935 (aged 28) | Kalocsa, Hungary |
| Hungary | Péter Sós | 3 January 1938 (aged 26) | Budapest, Hungary |
| Hungary | Lajos Varga | 23 November 1933 (aged 30) | Gyoma, Hungary |
| India | Bandu Bhosle | 10 October 1945 (aged 19) | |
| India | Vithal Karande | 12 March 1940 (aged 24) | |
| India | Darshan Mondal | 7 June 1940 (aged 24) | |
| India | Jagmal More | 10 September 1944 (aged 20) | |
| India | Anant Ram | 21 October 1932 (aged 31) | Behran, Himachal Pradesh |
| India | Trilok Singh | 13 June 1933 (aged 31) | |
| Iran | Jalal Bazargan-Vali | 23 December 1939 (aged 24) | |
| Italy | Giovanni Carminucci | 14 November 1939 (aged 24) | San Benedetto del Tronto, Italy |
| Italy | Pasquale Carminucci | 29 August 1937 (aged 27) | San Benedetto del Tronto, Italy |
| Italy | Luigi Cimnaghi | 10 August 1940 (aged 24) | Meda, Italy |
| Italy | Bruno Franceschetti | 30 April 1941 (aged 23) | Minerbe, Italy |
| Italy | Franco Menichelli | 3 August 1941 (aged 23) | Rome, Italy |
| Italy | Angelo Vicardi | 9 October 1936 (aged 28) | Melegnano, Italy |
| Japan | Yukio Endō | 18 January 1937 (aged 27) | Akita, Japan |
| Japan | Takuji Hayata | 10 October 1940 (aged 24) | Tanabe, Japan |
| Japan | Takashi Mitsukuri | 19 February 1939 (aged 25) | Toyama Prefecture, Japan |
| Japan | Takashi Ono | 26 July 1931 (aged 33) | Noshiro, Japan |
| Japan | Shuji Tsurumi | 29 January 1938 (aged 26) | Tokyo, Japan |
| Japan | Haruhiro Yamashita | 15 November 1938 (aged 25) | Uwajima, Japan |
| Luxembourg | Ady Stefanetti | 17 November 1942 (aged 21) | Niederkorn, Luxembourg |
| Luxembourg | Josy Stoffel | 27 June 1928 (aged 36) | Differdange, Luxembourg |
| Mongolia | Zagdbazaryn Davaanyam | 15 December 1944 (aged 19) | Ulaanbaatar, Mongolia |
| Norway | Åge Storhaug | 5 April 1938 (aged 26) | Klepp, Norway |
| Norway | Harald Wigaard | 17 May 1944 (aged 20) | Oslo, Norway |
| Philippines | Demetrio Pastrana | 4 September 1941 (aged 23) | |
| Philippines | Fortunato Payao | 3 March 1940 (aged 24) | |
| Poland | Jan Jankowicz | 9 December 1932 (aged 31) | Skarżysko-Kamienna, Poland |
| Poland | Andrzej Konopka | 1 September 1934 (aged 30) | Sandomierz, Poland |
| Poland | Mikołaj Kubica | 27 October 1945 (aged 18) | Niedobczyce, Poland |
| Poland | Wilhelm Kubica | 29 December 1943 (aged 20) | Niedobczyce, Poland |
| Poland | Alfred Kucharczyk | 2 November 1937 (aged 26) | Radlin, Poland |
| Poland | Aleksander Rokosa | 17 July 1936 (aged 28) | Brzeziny, Poland |
| Romania | Anton Cadar | 18 January 1941 (aged 23) | Târgu Mureș, Romania |
| Romania | Gheorghe Condovici | 30 July 1941 (aged 23) | Bucharest, Romania |
| Romania | Petre Miclăuș | 10 June 1939 (aged 25) | Satu Mare, Romania |
| Romania | Frederic Orendi | 12 March 1930 (aged 34) | Mediaș, Romania |
| Romania | Alexandru Szilaghi | 8 February 1942 (aged 22) | Cluj-Napoca, Romania |
| Romania | Gheorghe Tohăneanu | 1 June 1936 (aged 28) | Întorsura Buzăului, Romania |
| South Korea | Gang Su-il | 8 October 1943 (aged 21) | |
| South Korea | Jeong Ri-gwang | 11 January 1942 (aged 22) | |
| South Korea | Kim Chung-tae | 16 January 1944 (aged 20) | Seoul, South Korea |
| South Korea | Kim Gwang-deok | 1 January 1942 (aged 22) | |
| South Korea | Lee Gwang-jae | 25 September 1941 (aged 23) | |
| South Korea | Seo Jae-gyu | 27 August 1940 (aged 24) | |
| Soviet Union | Sergey Diomidov | 9 July 1943 (aged 21) | Turtkul, Uzbek SSR |
| Soviet Union | Viktor Leontyev | 27 April 1940 (aged 24) | Moscow, Russian SFSR |
| Soviet Union | Viktor Lisitsky | 18 October 1939 (aged 24) | Magnitogorsk, Russian SFSR |
| Soviet Union | Boris Shakhlin | 27 January 1932 (aged 32) | Ishim, Russian SFSR |
| Soviet Union | Yuri Titov | 27 November 1935 (aged 28) | Omsk, Russian SFSR |
| Soviet Union | Yuri Tsapenko | 25 July 1938 (aged 26) | Almaty, Kazakh SSR |
| Sweden | Leif Korn | 26 July 1937 (aged 27) | Stockholm, Sweden |
| Sweden | Stig Lindewall | 15 August 1936 (aged 28) | Adelsö, Sweden |
| Sweden | William Thoresson | 31 May 1932 (aged 32) | Gothenburg, Sweden |
| Switzerland | Meinrad Berchtold | 2 December 1943 (aged 20) | Baden, Switzerland |
| Switzerland | Fredi Egger | 2 March 1941 (aged 23) | |
| Switzerland | Franz Fäh | 22 November 1937 (aged 26) | |
| Switzerland | Gottlieb Fässler | 13 April 1934 (aged 30) | |
| Switzerland | Fritz Feuz | 28 April 1931 (aged 33) | Wilderswil, Switzerland |
| Switzerland | Walter Müller | 5 March 1940 (aged 24) | |
| Taiwan | Lai Chu-Long | 10 March 1942 (aged 22) | Changhua, Taiwan |
| Taiwan | Lee Bu-Ti | 11 April 1941 (aged 23) | |
| Taiwan | Liu Reng-Sun | 28 October 1941 (aged 22) | |
| Taiwan | Ui Yah-Tor | 10 August 1938 (aged 26) | |
| Taiwan | Wang Shian-Ming | 8 September 1940 (aged 24) | |
| Taiwan | Yan Tai-San | 3 January 1938 (aged 26) | |
| United States | Larry Banner | 6 June 1936 (aged 28) | Van Nuys, California |
| United States | Ronald Barak | 7 June 1943 (aged 21) | Los Angeles, California |
| United States | Russell Mitchell | 1 June 1942 (aged 22) | Phoenix, Arizona |
| United States | Makoto Sakamoto | 8 April 1947 (aged 17) | Tokyo, Japan |
| United States | Arthur Shurlock | 8 September 1937 (aged 27) | Chicago, Illinois |
| United States | Gregor Weiss | 18 February 1941 (aged 23) | Newark, New Jersey |
| Yugoslavia | Janez Brodnik | 6 May 1944 (aged 20) | Golnik, Yugoslavia |
| Yugoslavia | Ivan Čaklec | 5 August 1932 (aged 32) | Varaždin, Yugoslavia |
| Yugoslavia | Miroslav Cerar | 28 October 1939 (aged 24) | Ljubljana, Yugoslavia |
| Yugoslavia | Alojz Petrovič | 12 May 1936 (aged 28) | Čepin, Yugoslavia |
| Yugoslavia | Martin Šrot | 10 August 1938 (aged 26) | Celje, Yugoslavia |
| Yugoslavia | Nenad Vidović | 5 May 1939 (aged 25) | |
