= Gymnastics at the 1964 Summer Olympics – Women's artistic team all-around =

Women's artistic team all-around at the Games of the XVIII Olympiad

Medalists
| 1st place, gold medalist(s) | | Polina Astakhova, Lyudmila Gromova, Larisa Latynina, Tamara Manina, Elena Volchetskaya, and Tamara Zamotaylova | Soviet Union |
| 2nd place, silver medalist(s) | | Věra Čáslavská, Marianna Krajčírová, Jana Posnerová, Hana Růžičková, Jaroslava Sedláčková, and Adolfína Tkačíková | Czechoslovakia |
| 3rd place, bronze medalist(s) | | Toshiko Aihara, Ginko Chiba, Keiko Ikeda, Taniko Nakamura, Kiyoko Ono, and Hiroko Tsuji | Japan |

The women's team competition was a gymnastics event contested as part of the Gymnastics at the 1964 Summer Olympics programme at the Tokyo Metropolitan Gymnasium.

== Results ==
The score for the team was a sum of its 6 members' best scores. In each of the 4 apparatuses, the top 5 scores in each category (compulsory and optional) were summed, for a total of 8 categories. 400 points were possible.

| Rank | Team | Vault | | | Uneven Bars | | | Balance Beam | | | Floor | | | Total | Rank |
| Rank | Team | C | O | Rank | C | O | Rank | C | O | Rank | C | O | Rank | Total | Rank |
|---|---|---|---|---|---|---|---|---|---|---|---|---|---|---|---|
| Gold medal | Soviet Union | 95.031 | | 3 | 94.664 | | 2 | 95.464 | | 1 | 95.731 | | 1 | 380.890 | |
| Gold medal | Larisa Latynina | 9.500 | 9.666 | 5 | 9.533 | 9.600 | 4 | 9.500 | 9.733 | 3 | 9.666 | 9.800 | 1 | 76.998 | 2 |
| Gold medal | Polina Astakhova | 9.466 | 9.566 | 7 | 9.633 | 9.700 | 2 | 9.400 | 9.800 | 5 | 9.700 | 9.700 | 2 | 76.965 | 3 |
| Gold medal | Elena Volchetskaya | 9.633 | 9.600 | 3 | 9.400 | 9.233 | 24 | 9.366 | 9.600 | 7 | 9.433 | 9.500 | 13 | 75.765 | 8 |
| Gold medal | Tamara Zamotaylova | 9.366 | 9.400 | 26 | 9.533 | 9.533 | 6 | 9.200 | 9.533 | 17 | 9.400 | 9.433 | 18 | 75.398 | 13 |
| Gold medal | Tamara Manina | 9.400 | 9.366 | 26 | 9.433 | 8.966 | 37 | 9.466 | 9.800 | 2 | 9.500 | 9.466 | 10 | 75.397 | 14 |
| Gold medal | Lyudmila Gromova | 9.400 | 9.400 | 22 | 9.500 | 8.533 | 54 | 9.266 | 9.433 | 22 | 9.300 | 9.566 | 16 | 74.398 | 30 |
| Silver medal | Czechoslovakia | 95.231 | | 1 | 95.164 | | 1 | 95.263 | | 2 | 94.331 | | 4 | 379.989 | |
| Silver medal | Věra Čáslavská | 9.700 | 9.800 | 1 | 9.666 | 9.766 | 1 | 9.566 | 9.800 | 1 | 9.500 | 9.766 | 3 | 77.564 | 1 |
| Silver medal | Hana Růžičková | 9.433 | 9.433 | 18 | 9.400 | 9.633 | 7 | 9.466 | 9.766 | 4 | 9.400 | 9.566 | 10 | 76.097 | 5 |
| Silver medal | Jaroslava Sedláčková | 9.433 | 9.500 | 13 | 9.366 | 9.600 | 8 | 9.400 | 9.566 | 7 | 9.300 | 9.433 | 21 | 75.598 | 11 |
| Silver medal | Adolfína Tkačíková | 9.400 | 9.566 | 10 | 9.400 | 9.333 | 18 | 9.366 | 9.533 | 11 | 9.333 | 9.400 | 21 | 75.331 | 16 |
| Silver medal | Marianna Krajčírová | 9.400 | 9.500 | 15 | 9.466 | 9.500 | 8 | 9.266 | 9.300 | 31 | 9.200 | 9.266 | 40 | 74.898 | 22 |
| Silver medal | Jana Posnerová | 9.466 | 9.433 | 16 | 9.400 | 9.033 | 34 | 9.300 | 9.500 | 15 | 9.300 | 9.333 | 29 | 74.765 | 23 |
| Bronze medal | Japan | 95.097 | | 2 | 94.496 | | 3 | 93.759 | | 4 | 94.532 | | 2 | 377.889 | |
| Bronze medal | Keiko Ikeda | 9.466 | 9.533 | 9 | 9.466 | 9.300 | 16 | 9.466 | 9.700 | 6 | 9.500 | 9.600 | 7 | 76.031 | 6 |
| Bronze medal | Toshiko Aihara | 9.633 | 9.600 | 3 | 9.466 | 9.633 | 5 | 9.333 | 9.266 | 29 | 9.533 | 9.533 | 8 | 75.997 | 7 |
| Bronze medal | Kiyoko Ono | 9.500 | 9.466 | 10 | 9.366 | 9.600 | 8 | 9.233 | 9.500 | 17 | 9.400 | 9.600 | 9 | 75.665 | 9 |
| Bronze medal | Taniko Nakamura | 9.533 | 9.400 | 13 | 9.400 | 9.566 | 8 | 9.133 | 9.466 | 29 | 9.300 | 9.400 | 23 | 75.198 | 19 |
| Bronze medal | Ginko Chiba | 9.466 | 9.500 | 10 | 9.233 | 9.433 | 21 | 9.133 | 9.300 | 38 | 9.300 | 9.300 | 32 | 74.665 | 24 |
| Bronze medal | Hiroko Tsuji | 9.466 | 9.333 | 23 | 9.266 | 9.300 | 29 | 9.233 | 9.400 | 27 | 9.233 | 9.366 | 33 | 74.597 | 25 |
| 4 | United Team of Germany | 94.664 | | 4 | 93.696 | | 5 | 93.248 | | 5 | 94.430 | | 3 | 376.038 | |
| 4 | Birgit Radochla | 9.766 | 9.600 | 2 | 9.433 | 9.500 | 14 | 9.400 | 9.533 | 9 | 9.566 | 9.633 | 5 | 76.431 | 4 |
| 4 | Ute Starke | 9.600 | 9.500 | 6 | 9.433 | 9.433 | 15 | 9.333 | 9.400 | 17 | 9.500 | 9.433 | 13 | 75.632 | 10 |
| 4 | Ingrid Föst | 9.500 | 9.500 | 8 | 9.300 | 9.366 | 21 | 9.366 | 9.300 | 26 | 9.533 | 9.600 | 6 | 75.465 | 12 |
| 4 | Karin Mannewitz | 9.266 | 9.166 | 50 | 9.333 | 9.366 | 20 | 9.266 | 9.300 | 31 | 9.366 | 9.300 | 25 | 75.363 | 31 |
| 4 | Christel Felgner | 9.300 | 9.366 | 30 | 9.266 | 9.233 | 33 | 9.200 | 9.150 | 46 | 9.333 | 9.166 | 39 | 74.014 | 35 |
| 4 | Barbara Stolz | 9.266 | 9.266 | 40 | 9.100 | 9.266 | 39 | 9.133 | 9.133 | 49 | 9.200 | 9.066 | 49 | 73.430 | 44 |
| 5 | Hungary | 93.096 | | 7 | 93.998 | | 4 | 94.030 | | 3 | 94.331 | | 4 | 375.455 | |
| 5 | Anikó Ducza-Jánosi | 9.266 | 9.400 | 30 | 9.166 | 9.400 | 29 | 9.433 | 9.466 | 11 | 9.600 | 9.600 | 4 | 75.331 | 16 |
| 5 | Katalin Makray | 9.133 | 9.266 | 51 | 9.566 | 9.600 | 3 | 9.333 | 9.466 | 16 | 9.466 | 9.500 | 10 | 75.330 | 18 |
| 5 | Mária Tressel | 9.300 | 9.033 | 55 | 9.466 | 9.500 | 8 | 9.300 | 9.433 | 17 | 9.500 | 9.400 | 15 | 74.932 | 21 |
| 5 | Gyöngyi Mák-Kovács | 9.266 | 9.300 | 35 | 9.200 | 9.466 | 21 | 9.266 | 9.433 | 22 | 9.400 | 9.266 | 25 | 74.597 | 25 |
| 5 | Katalin Müller | 9.200 | 9.266 | 46 | 9.300 | 9.300 | 26 | 9.400 | 9.500 | 10 | 9.333 | 9.266 | 33 | 74.565 | 27 |
| 5 | Márta Tolnai-Erdős | 9.466 | 9.366 | 21 | 9.200 | 9.200 | 36 | 9.200 | 9.333 | 34 | 9.266 | 9.200 | 40 | 74.231 | 32 |
| 6 | Romania | 93.229 | | 6 | 93.362 | | 6 | 93.229 | | 6 | 92.164 | | 8 | 371.984 | |
| 6 | Sonia Iovan | 9.433 | 9.466 | 16 | 9.433 | 9.533 | 8 | 9.366 | 9.500 | 14 | 9.266 | 9.400 | 25 | 75.397 | 14 |
| 6 | Elena Leușteanu | 9.266 | 9.366 | 33 | 9.366 | 9.400 | 16 | 9.366 | 9.533 | 11 | 9.300 | 9.533 | 18 | 75.130 | 20 |
| 6 | Elena Ceampelea | 9.266 | 9.400 | 30 | 9.133 | 9.266 | 37 | 9.166 | 9.400 | 31 | 9.200 | 9.000 | 50 | 73.831 | 37 |
| 6 | Atanasia Ionescu | 9.300 | 9.200 | 42 | 9.166 | 9.433 | 27 | 9.166 | 9.300 | 35 | 9.000 | 9.133 | 53 | 73.698 | 41 |
| 6 | Emilia Vătășoiu | 9.166 | 8.466 | 71 | 9.233 | 9.366 | 27 | 9.166 | 9.266 | 39 | 9.066 | 9.266 | 47 | 72.995 | 48 |
| 6 | Cristina Doboșan | 9.266 | 9.266 | 40 | 9.166 | 9.266 | 35 | 9.100 | 8.300 | 72 | 9.000 | 9.133 | 53 | 72.497 | 54 |
| 7 | Poland | 93.431 | | 5 | 91.531 | | 8 | 93.195 | | 7 | 93.130 | | 6 | 371.287 | |
| 7 | Gerda Bryłka | 9.366 | 9.433 | 23 | 9.000 | 9.233 | 45 | 9.266 | 9.466 | 21 | 9.266 | 9.533 | 20 | 74.563 | 28 |
| 7 | Małgorzata Wilczek | 9.400 | 9.466 | 18 | 9.033 | 9.266 | 42 | 9.366 | 9.333 | 22 | 9.333 | 9.366 | 24 | 74.563 | 28 |
| 7 | Barbara Eustachiewicz | 9.233 | 9.300 | 38 | 9.300 | 9.333 | 24 | 9.066 | 9.366 | 39 | 9.066 | 9.533 | 33 | 74.197 | 33 |
| 7 | Elżbieta Apostolska | 9.233 | 9.300 | 38 | 9.000 | 9.133 | 48 | 9.166 | 9.466 | 28 | 9.200 | 9.333 | 36 | 73.831 | 37 |
| 7 | Dorota Miler | 9.400 | 9.300 | 28 | 9.100 | 9.000 | 51 | 9.133 | 9.333 | 35 | 9.033 | 9.166 | 51 | 73.465 | 43 |
| 7 | Gizela Niedurna | 8.933 | 9.133 | 65 | 9.133 | 9.000 | 48 | 9.300 | 8.366 | 68 | 9.200 | 9.300 | 37 | 72.365 | 56 |
| 8 | Sweden | 92.829 | | 8 | 91.631 | | 7 | 91.598 | | 9 | 91.830 | | 9 | 367.888 | |
| 8 | Marie Lundqvist | 9.300 | 9.266 | 35 | 9.200 | 9.133 | 40 | 9.100 | 9.166 | 49 | 9.300 | 9.333 | 29 | 73.798 | 39 |
| 8 | Solveig Egman-Andersson | 9.433 | 9.366 | 23 | 9.400 | 8.833 | 45 | 9.100 | 9.300 | 41 | 9.166 | 9.166 | 47 | 73.764 | 40 |
| 8 | Ewa Rydell | 9.366 | 9.233 | 34 | 9.300 | 8.800 | 51 | 9.000 | 9.400 | 41 | 9.200 | 9.300 | 32 | 73.599 | 42 |
| 8 | Ulla Lindström | 9.266 | 9.233 | 44 | 8.833 | 8.900 | 59 | 9.100 | 9.200 | 48 | 9.233 | 9.133 | 43 | 72.898 | 50 |
| 8 | Anne-Marie Lambert | 9.200 | 9.066 | 56 | 9.166 | 9.166 | 41 | 9.066 | 9.133 | 55 | 8.933 | 9.066 | 60 | 72.796 | 52 |
| 8 | Gerola Lindahl | 9.300 | 9.066 | 54 | 9.300 | 9.233 | 31 | 8.966 | 9.166 | 58 | 8.766 | 8.966 | 65 | 72.763 | 53 |
| 9 | United States | 92.531 | | 9 | 89.963 | | 9 | 92.044 | | 8 | 92.864 | | 7 | 367.321 | |
| 9 | Dorothy McClements | 9.400 | 9.466 | 18 | 9.066 | 9.233 | 42 | 9.000 | 9.233 | 54 | 9.333 | 9.333 | 25 | 74.064 | 34 |
| 9 | Linda Metheny | 9.333 | 8.933 | 56 | 9.400 | 9.300 | 19 | 9.166 | 9.533 | 22 | 9.133 | 9.200 | 46 | 73.998 | 36 |
| 9 | Kathleen Corrigan | 9.400 | 9.300 | 28 | 8.933 | 9.100 | 54 | 8.900 | 9.166 | 59 | 8.966 | 9.066 | 59 | 72.831 | 51 |
| 9 | Muriel Grossfeld | 8.800 | 8.600 | 74 | 9.266 | 8.133 | 62 | 8.933 | 9.466 | 43 | 9.433 | 9.433 | 16 | 72.064 | 58 |
| 9 | Marie Walther | 9.233 | 9.033 | 56 | 9.366 | 7.500 | 66 | 8.900 | 9.366 | 49 | 9.300 | 9.333 | 29 | 72.031 | 60 |
| 9 | Janie Speaks | 9.233 | 9.200 | 47 | 8.533 | 8.166 | 69 | 9.066 | 9.300 | 44 | 9.066 | 9.300 | 43 | 71.864 | 62 |
| 10 | Australia | 86.663 | | 10 | 80.696 | | 10 | 86.730 | | 10 | 88.146 | | 10 | 342.325 | |
| 10 | Barbara Fletcher | 8.300 | 8.666 | 79 | 8.233 | 8.600 | 67 | 8.966 | 9.233 | 55 | 8.866 | 8.766 | 69 | 69.630 | 69 |
| 10 | Valerie Buffham | 9.166 | 9.033 | 62 | 7.966 | 8.466 | 73 | 8.633 | 8.466 | 75 | 8.700 | 9.000 | 66 | 69.430 | 70 |
| 10 | Valerie Roberts | 8.966 | 8.433 | 75 | 8.000 | 8.466 | 72 | 8.900 | 9.033 | 66 | 8.800 | 8.666 | 75 | 69.264 | 72 |
| 10 | Janice Bedford | 9.000 | 8.033 | 78 | 7.833 | 8.133 | 78 | 8.900 | 9.133 | 62 | 9.033 | 8.916 | 62 | 68.981 | 74 |
| 10 | Barbara Cage | 8.600 | 8.466 | 77 | 7.366 | 7.633 | 80 | 8.333 | 7.133 | 80 | 8.666 | 8.733 | 78 | 64.930 | 79 |
| 10 | Lynette Hancock | - | - | 83 | - | - | 83 | - | - | 84 | - | - | 84 | 0.000 | 84 |
| | Veronica Grymonprez (BEL) | 9.333 | 9.233 | 35 | 9.100 | 8.966 | 53 | 9.233 | 9.033 | 49 | 9.233 | 9.133 | 43 | 73.264 | 45 |
| | Rayna Grigorova (BUL) | 9.233 | 9.166 | 51 | 9.133 | 9.166 | 42 | 9.066 | 9.266 | 47 | 9.033 | 9.100 | 53 | 73.163 | 46 |
| | Evelyne Letourneur (FRA) | 9.100 | 9.033 | 63 | 9.266 | 9.266 | 32 | 9.266 | 8.766 | 64 | 9.233 | 9.166 | 42 | 73.096 | 47 |
| | Monique Baelden (FRA) | 9.200 | 9.000 | 60 | 9.166 | 9.066 | 47 | 9.166 | 9.200 | 44 | 9.133 | 9.033 | 52 | 72.964 | 49 |
| | Gail Daley (CAN) | 9.300 | 9.200 | 42 | 8.933 | 9.000 | 57 | 9.033 | 9.033 | 59 | 8.866 | 9.100 | 61 | 72.465 | 55 |
| | Liliana Alexandrova (BUL) | 9.166 | 9.233 | 51 | 8.633 | 9.033 | 61 | 9.000 | 9.266 | 49 | 8.900 | 9.133 | 58 | 72.364 | 57 |
| | Choi Yeong-suk (KOR) | 9.133 | 9.300 | 47 | 8.933 | 9.100 | 54 | 9.033 | 8.933 | 65 | 8.566 | 9.066 | 69 | 72.064 | 58 |
| | Henriette Parzer (AUT) | 9.200 | 9.233 | 47 | 8.333 | 8.966 | 65 | 8.800 | 9.233 | 62 | 9.066 | 9.066 | 56 | 71.897 | 61 |
| | Tsagaandorjiin Gündegmaa (MGL) | 9.066 | 8.633 | 70 | 9.033 | 8.900 | 57 | 9.200 | 9.266 | 35 | 8.633 | 8.900 | 73 | 71.631 | 63 |
| | Jacqueline Brisepierre (FRA) | 8.933 | 9.066 | 66 | 9.100 | 7.666 | 68 | 9.066 | 9.133 | 55 | 9.066 | 9.033 | 57 | 71.063 | 64 |
| | Lee Deok-bun (KOR) | 8.966 | 9.000 | 67 | 8.000 | 8.600 | 71 | 8.966 | 9.100 | 59 | 8.566 | 9.000 | 72 | 70.198 | 65 |
| | Eira Lehtonen (FIN) | 8.766 | 8.966 | 69 | 8.833 | 8.500 | 64 | 8.733 | 8.400 | 74 | 8.900 | 9.033 | 63 | 70.131 | 66 |
| | Yadamsürengiin Tuyaa (MGL) | 9.000 | 8.433 | 73 | 8.833 | 8.566 | 62 | 9.000 | 8.733 | 67 | 8.800 | 8.600 | 77 | 69.965 | 67 |
| | Esbela da Fonseca (POR) | 9.133 | 9.000 | 63 | 8.066 | 8.633 | 69 | 8.666 | 8.833 | 71 | 8.566 | 8.866 | 76 | 69.763 | 68 |
| | Denise Goddard (GBR) | 9.300 | 8.900 | 60 | 8.100 | 8.166 | 76 | 8.666 | 8.533 | 73 | 8.600 | 9.100 | 66 | 69.365 | 71 |
| | Jeong Bong-sun (KOR) | 9.233 | 9.266 | 44 | 9.066 | 9.066 | 50 | 8.800 | 6.000 | 82 | 8.600 | 9.000 | 71 | 69.031 | 73 |
| | Theodora Hill (NZL) | 8.600 | 8.933 | 72 | 8.400 | 7.833 | 77 | 8.800 | 8.700 | 70 | 8.766 | 8.933 | 68 | 68.965 | 75 |
| | Pauline Gardiner (NZL) | 8.933 | 8.833 | 68 | 8.133 | 8.266 | 74 | 8.733 | 8.066 | 76 | 8.633 | 8.733 | 79 | 68.330 | 76 |
| | Monica Rutherford (GBR) | 9.266 | 8.966 | 59 | 7.200 | 8.200 | 79 | 8.633 | 7.900 | 78 | 8.800 | 9.100 | 64 | 68.065 | 77 |
| | Jean Spencer (NZL) | 8.600 | 8.500 | 76 | 7.933 | 8.400 | 75 | 8.666 | 7.300 | 79 | 8.366 | 8.600 | 81 | 66.365 | 78 |
| | Salme Koskinen (FIN) | 8.966 | - | 82 | 8.866 | 8.866 | 60 | 8.600 | 9.066 | 68 | 8.666 | 8.833 | 74 | 61.863 | 80 |
| | Hong Tai-Kwai (ROC) | 7.866 | 5.566 | 80 | 4.500 | 6.933 | 81 | 8.800 | 7.866 | 77 | 8.700 | 8.666 | 79 | 58.897 | 81 |
| | Jamileh Sorouri (IRI) | 5.733 | 6.933 | 81 | 3.000 | 5.000 | 82 | 7.233 | 8.000 | 81 | 6.500 | 7.533 | 83 | 49.932 | 82 |
| | Evelyn Magluyan (PHI) | - | - | 83 | - | - | 83 | 7.666 | 6.666 | 83 | 6.866 | 8.266 | 82 | 29.464 | 83 |
| | Maria Floro (PHI) | - | - | 83 | - | - | 83 | - | - | 84 | - | - | 84 | 0.000 | 84 |
| | Chai Huang-Tai (ROC) | - | - | 83 | - | - | 83 | - | - | 84 | - | - | 84 | 0.000 | 84 |

== Sources ==
- Tokyo Organizing Committee (1964). The Games of the XVIII Olympiad: Tokyo 1964, vol. 2.
