= Gymnastics at the 1964 Summer Olympics – Women's individual all-around =

Women's artistic individual all-around at the Games of the XVIII Olympiad
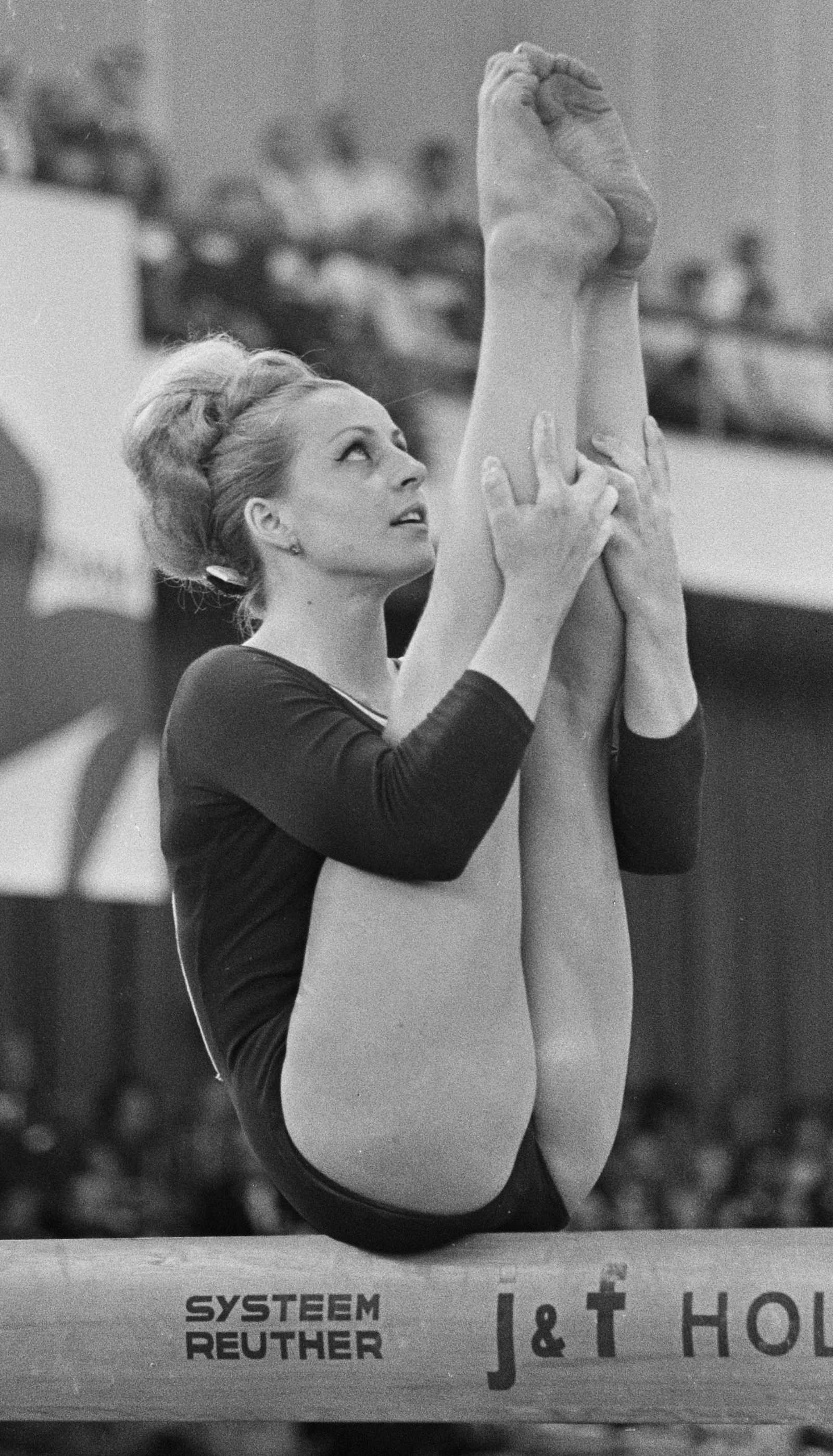
- Gold medalist Věra Čáslavská (1967)
- Venue: Tokyo Metropolitan Gymnasium
- Date: 19–21 October 1964
- Competitors: 83 from 24 nations
- Winning total: 77.564

Medalists
1st place, gold medalist(s)		Věra Čáslavská	Czechoslovakia
2nd place, silver medalist(s)		Larisa Latynina	Soviet Union
3rd place, bronze medalist(s)		Polina Astakhova	Soviet Union

The women's individual all-around was a gymnastics event contested as part of the Gymnastics at the 1964 Summer Olympics programme at the Tokyo Metropolitan Gymnasium.

== Results ==
The score for the individual all-around was a simple sum of each gymnast's preliminary scores from the four apparatus events.

Place	Gymnast	Floor	Vault	Uneven bars	Beam	Total
Gold	Věra Čáslavská (TCH)	19.266	19.500	19.432	19.366	77.564
Silver	Larisa Latynina (URS)	19.466	19.166	19.133	19.233	76.998
Bronze	Polina Astakhova (URS)	19.400	19.032	19.333	19.200	76.965
4.	Birgit Radochla (EUA)	19.199	19.366	18.933	18.933	76.431
5.	Hana Růžičková (TCH)	18.966	18.866	19.033	19.232	76.097
6.	Keiko Tanaka-Ikeda (JPN)	19.100	18.999	18.766	19.166	76.031
7.	Toshiko Shirasu-Aihara (JPN)	19.066	19.233	19.099	18.599	75.997
8.	Elena Volchetskaya (URS)	18.933	19.233	18.633	18.966	75.765
9.	Kiyoko Ono (JPN)	19.000	18.966	18.966	18.733	75.665
10.	Ute Starke (EUA)	18.933	19.100	18.866	18.733	75.632
11.	Jaroslava Sedláčková (TCH)	18.733	18.933	18.966	18.966	75.598
12.	Ingrid Föst (EUA)	19.133	19.000	18.666	18.666	75.465
13.	Tamara Zamotaylova (URS)	18.833	18.766	19.066	18.733	75.398
14.	Sonia Iovan (ROU)	18.666	18.899	18.966	18.866	75.397
14.	Tamara Manina (URS)	18.966	18.766	18.399	19.266	75.397
16.	Anikó Ducza-Jánosi (HUN)	19.200	18.666	18.566	18.899	75.331
16.	Adolfína Tkačíková (TCH)	18.733	18.966	18.733	18.899	75.331
18.	Katalin Makray (HUN)	18.966	18.399	19.166	18.799	75.330
19.	Taniko Nakamura (JPN)	18.700	18.933	18.966	18.599	75.198
20.	Elena Leușteanu (ROU)	18.833	18.632	18.766	18.899	75.130
21.	Mária Tressel (HUN)	18.900	18.333	18.966	18.733	74.932
22.	Marianna Krajčírová (TCH)	18.466	18.900	18.966	18.566	74.898
23.	Jana Posnerová (TCH)	18.633	18.899	18.433	18.800	74.765
24.	Ginko Chiba (JPN)	18.600	18.966	18.666	18.433	74.665
25.	Gyöngyi Mák-Kovács (HUN)	18.666	18.566	18.666	18.699	74.597
25.	Hiroko Tsuji (JPN)	18.599	18.799	18.566	18.633	74.597
27.	Katalin Müller (HUN)	18.599	18.466	18.600	18.900	74.565
28.	Gerda Bryłka (POL)	18.799	18.799	18.233	18.732	74.563
28.	Małgorzata Wilczek (POL)	18.699	18.866	18.299	18.699	74.563
30.	Lyudmila Gromova (URS)	18.866	18.800	18.033	18.699	74.398
31.	Karin Mannewitz (EUA)	18.666	18.432	18.699	18.566	74.363
32.	Márta Tolnai-Erdős (HUN)	18.466	18.832	18.400	18.533	74.231
33.	Barbara Eustachiewicz (POL)	18.599	18.533	18.633	18.432	74.197
34.	Dale McClements (USA)	18.666	18.866	18.299	18.233	74.064
35.	Christel Felgner (EUA)	18.499	18.666	18.499	18.350	74.014
36.	Linda Metheny (USA)	18.333	18.266	18.700	18.699	73.998
37.	Elżbieta Apostolska (POL)	18.533	18.533	18.133	18.632	73.831
37.	Elena Ceampelea (ROU)	18.200	18.666	18.399	18.566	73.831
39.	Marie Lundqvist-Björk (SWE)	18.633	18.566	18.333	18.266	73.798
40.	Solveig Egman (SWE)	18.332	18.799	18.233	18.400	73.764
41.	Atanasia Ionescu (ROU)	18.133	18.500	18.599	18.466	73.698
42.	Ewa Rydell (SWE)	18.500	18.599	18.100	18.400	73.599
43.	Dorota Miler (POL)	18.199	18.700	18.100	18.466	73.465
44.	Barbara Stolz (EUA)	18.266	18.532	18.366	18.266	73.430
45.	Veronica Grymonprez (BEL)	18.366	18.566	18.066	18.266	73.264
46.	Rayna Grigorova (BUL)	18.133	18.399	18.299	18.332	73.163
47.	Evelyne Letourneur (FRA)	18.399	18.133	18.532	18.032	73.096
48.	Emilia Vătășoiu (ROU)	18.332	17.632	18.599	18.432	72.995
49.	Monique Baelden (FRA)	18.166	18.200	18.232	18.366	72.964
50.	Ulla Lindström (SWE)	18.366	18.499	17.733	18.300	72.898
51.	Kathleen Corrigan (USA)	18.032	18.700	18.033	18.066	72.831
52.	Anne-Marie Lambert (SWE)	17.999	18.266	18.332	18.199	72.796
53.	Gerola Lindahl (SWE)	17.732	18.366	18.533	18.132	72.763
54.	Cristina Doboșan (ROU)	18.133	18.532	18.432	17.400	72.497
55.	Gail Daley (CAN)	17.966	18.500	17.933	18.066	72.465
56.	Gizela Niedurna (POL)	18.500	18.066	18.133	17.666	72.365
57.	Liliyana Aleksandrova (BUL)	18.033	18.399	17.666	18.266	72.364
58.	Choi Yeong-suk (KOR)	17.632	18.433	18.033	17.966	72.064
58.	Muriel Grossfeld (USA)	18.866	17.400	17.399	18.399	72.064
60.	Marie Walther (USA)	18.633	18.266	16.866	18.266	72.031
61.	Henriette Parzer (AUT)	18.132	18.433	17.299	18.033	71.897
62.	Janie Speaks (USA)	18.366	18.433	16.699	18.366	71.864
63.	Tsagaandorjiin Gündegmaa (MGL)	17.533	17.699	17.933	18.466	71.631
64.	Jacqueline Brisepierre (FRA)	18.099	17.999	16.766	18.199	71.063
65.	Lee Deok-bun (KOR)	17.566	17.966	16.600	18.066	70.198
66.	Eira Lehtonen (FIN)	17.933	17.732	17.333	17.133	70.131
67.	Yadamsürengiin Tuyaa (MGL)	17.400	17.433	17.399	17.733	69.965
68.	Esbela da Fonseca (POR)	17.432	18.133	16.699	17.499	69.763
69.	Barbara Fletcher (AUS)	17.632	16.966	16.833	18.199	69.630
70.	Valerie Buffham (AUS)	17.700	18.199	16.432	17.099	69.430
71.	Denise Goddard (GBR)	17.700	18.200	16.266	17.199	69.365
72.	Valerie Roberts (AUS)	17.466	17.399	16.466	17.933	69.264
73.	Jeong Bong-sun (KOR)	17.600	18.499	18.132	14.800	69.031
74.	Janice Bedford (AUS)	17.949	17.033	15.966	18.033	68.981
75.	Theodora Hill (NZL)	17.699	17.533	16.233	17.500	68.965
76.	Pauline Gardiner (NZL)	17.366	17.766	16.399	16.799	68.330
77.	Monica Rutherford (GBR)	17.900	18.232	15.400	16.533	68.065
78.	Jean Spencer (NZL)	16.966	17.100	16.333	15.966	66.365
79.	Barbara Cage (AUS)	17.399	17.066	14.999	15.466	64.930
80.	Kaarina Koskinen (FIN)	17.499	8.966	17.732	17.666	61.863
81.	Hong Tai-Kwai (ROC)	17.366	13.432	11.433	16.666	58.897
82.	Jamileh Sorouri (IRI)	14.033	12.666	8.000	15.233	49.932
83.	Evelyn Magluyan (PHI)	15.132	0.000	0.000	14.332	29.464
84.	Lynette Hancock (AUS)	0.000	0.000	0.000	0.000	0.000
84.	Maria-Luisa Floro (PHI)	0.000	0.000	0.000	0.000	0.000
84.	Chai Kuang-Tai (ROC)	0.000	0.000	0.000	0.000	0.000

== Sources ==
- Tokyo Organizing Committee (1964). The Games of the XVIII Olympiad: Tokyo 1964, vol. 2.
