= Larisa Latynina =

Russian gymnast (born 1934)

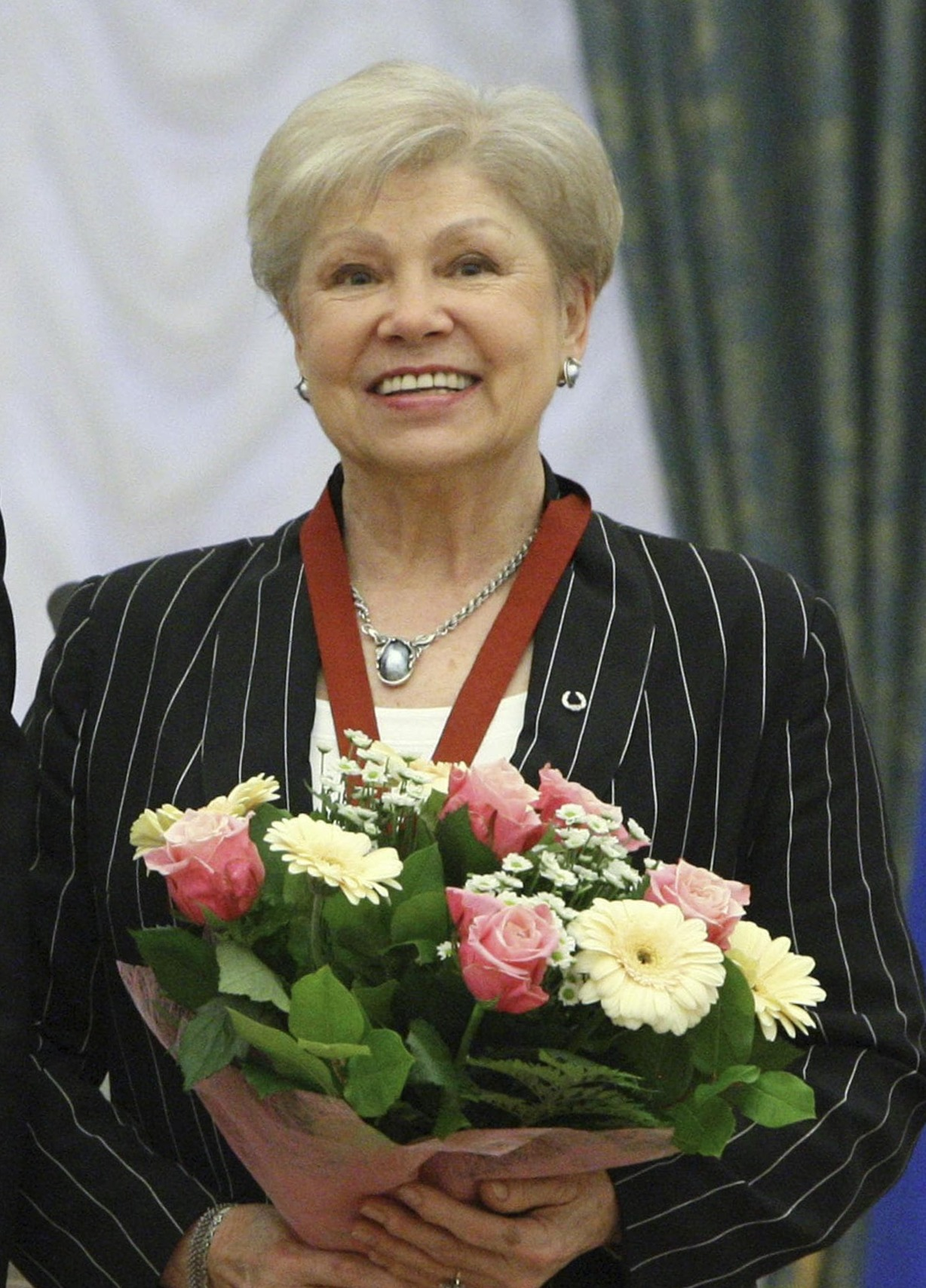
- Latynina in the Kremlin in 2010

Personal information
- Full name: Larisa Semyonovna Latynina
- Born: 27 December 1934 (age 91) Kherson, Ukrainian SSR, Soviet Union
- Height: 161 cm (5 ft 3 in)

Gymnastics career
- Discipline: Women's artistic gymnastics
- Country represented: Soviet Union; (1953–1966)
- Gym: Round Lake national training center Burevestnik Kyiv
- Retired: 1966
Medal record
Representing Soviet Union
Women's artistic gymnastics
Event	1st	2nd	3rd
Olympic Games	9	5	4
World Championships	9	4	1
European Championships	7	6	1
Total	25	15	6
Olympic Games
Gold medal – first place	1956 Melbourne	Team
Gold medal – first place	1956 Melbourne	All-Around
Gold medal – first place	1956 Melbourne	Vault
Gold medal – first place	1956 Melbourne	Floor exercise
Gold medal – first place	1960 Rome	Team
Gold medal – first place	1960 Rome	All-around
Gold medal – first place	1960 Rome	Floor exercise
Gold medal – first place	1964 Tokyo	Team
Gold medal – first place	1964 Tokyo	Floor exercise
Silver medal – second place	1956 Melbourne	Uneven bars
Silver medal – second place	1960 Rome	Uneven bars
Silver medal – second place	1960 Rome	Balance beam
Silver medal – second place	1964 Tokyo	All-around
Silver medal – second place	1964 Tokyo	Vault
Bronze medal – third place	1956 Melbourne	Team, apparatus
Bronze medal – third place	1960 Rome	Vault
Bronze medal – third place	1964 Tokyo	Uneven bars
Bronze medal – third place	1964 Tokyo	Balance beam
World Championships
Gold medal – first place	1954 Rome	Team
Gold medal – first place	1958 Moscow	Team
Gold medal – first place	1958 Moscow	All-around
Gold medal – first place	1958 Moscow	Vault
Gold medal – first place	1958 Moscow	Uneven bars
Gold medal – first place	1958 Moscow	Balance beam
Gold medal – first place	1962 Prague	Team
Gold medal – first place	1962 Prague	All-around
Gold medal – first place	1962 Prague	Floor exercise
Silver medal – second place	1958 Moscow	Floor exercise
Silver medal – second place	1962 Prague	Vault
Silver medal – second place	1962 Prague	Balance beam
Silver medal – second place	1966 Dortmund	Team
Bronze medal – third place	1962 Prague	Uneven bars
European Championships
Gold medal – first place	1957 Bucharest	All-around
Gold medal – first place	1957 Bucharest	Vault
Gold medal – first place	1957 Bucharest	Uneven bars
Gold medal – first place	1957 Bucharest	Balance beam
Gold medal – first place	1957 Bucharest	Floor exercise
Gold medal – first place	1961 Leipzig	All-around
Gold medal – first place	1961 Leipzig	Floor exercise
Silver medal – second place	1961 Leipzig	Uneven bars
Silver medal – second place	1961 Leipzig	Balance beam
Silver medal – second place	1965 Sofia	All-around
Silver medal – second place	1965 Sofia	Uneven bars
Silver medal – second place	1965 Sofia	Balance beam
Silver medal – second place	1965 Sofia	Floor exercise
Bronze medal – third place	1965 Sofia	Vault

Larisa Semyonovna Latynina (Russian: Лариса Семёновна Латынина, née Diriy, Дирий; born 27 December 1934) is a Soviet former artistic gymnast. Between 1956 and 1964 she won 14 individual Olympic medals and four team medals for the Soviet Union. She holds the record for the most Olympic gold medals by a female gymnast, with nine. Her total of 18 Olympic medals was a record for 48 years. She held the record for individual event medals for over 52 years, winning 14. She is credited with helping to establish the Soviet Union as a dominant force in gymnastics.

== Early life ==
She was born as Larisa Semyonovna Diriy in Kherson, Ukrainian SSR. Her father, Semyon Andreyevich Diriy, left the family when she was 11 months old, and she was raised by her illiterate mother, who worked as a cleaner during the day, and as a watchman during the night. Her father was killed at the Battle of Stalingrad, where he served as a machine gun operator. Young Diriy-Latynina survived the occupation of Ukraine by Nazi Germany in 1940s.

She first practiced ballet, but turned to gymnastics after her choreographer moved out of Kherson. Her first gymnastics coach was Mykhailo Sotnychenko. In 1950 young Diriy-Latynina received her first sports degree (rozriad) and became a member of the Ukrainian students team at the All-Union gymnastics' competitions in Kazan. She graduated from high school in 1953 with a gold medal, and moved to Kyiv. She attended the Kyiv Polytechnic Institute (KPI), and continued her training at the Burevestnik VSS under coaching of Oleksandr Mishakov. Her first notable success came at the 4th World Festival of Youth and Students in Bucharest where she won gold medals. At the age of 19, she debuted internationally at the 1954 Rome World Championships, winning the gold medal in the team competition. Following the second semester, Latynina switched to the Institute of Physical culture from KPI.

== Gymnastics career ==
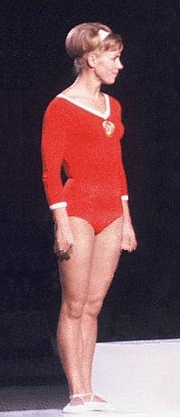
Latynina during the vault award ceremony at the 1964 Olympics

In 1956, at the age of 21, Latynina made her Olympic debut at the Melbourne Olympic Games. In the all-around event, she fought off stiff competition to win gold. She finished first in the vault, second in the uneven bars and in the exercise on the floor and fourth in the balancing beam. She also led the Soviet Union to victory in the Team Event. Her first Olympic gold medal Latynina gifted to her first coach Sotnychenko who kept it until his death. Later the wife of Sotnychenko returned the medal to Latynina. Also, following her success in Australia, she was awarded with the high sports title of the Merited Master of Sports of the USSR. Latynina won all gold medals at the 1957 European championship in gymnastics. For all her sports achievements in 1957 she was honored with the Order of Lenin. Around that time, she with her first husband Ivan Latynin from Leningrad who also studied in Kyiv. She graduated from the Institute with honors.

After a very successful World Championships in 1958 (winning five out of six titles despite competing whilst four months pregnant and medaling in every event), Latynina was the favorite for the 1960 Summer Olympics in Rome. In the all-around event, she led the Soviet Union to take the first four places, thereby also securing a win in the team competition by a margin of nine points. Latynina defended her floor title, took silver medals in the balance beam and uneven bars events, and bronze in the vault competition.

Latynina won all-around titles at the 1962 World Championships, beating Věra Čáslavská of Czechoslovakia. Still the defending World Champion at the 1964 Summer Olympics, she was beaten by Čáslavská in the all-around competition. Latynina added two more gold medals to her tally, winning the team event and the floor event both for the third time in a row. A silver medal and two bronzes in the other apparatus events brought her total of Olympic medals to eighteen—nine gold medals, five silver, and four bronze. She won a medal in every event in which she competed, except for the 1956 balance beam where she came in fourth.

Latynina's nine gold medals make her tied for third on the list of most Olympic gold medalists. She held the distinction of having more Olympic medals (either individually or with a team) than anybody, from 1964 until 2012. She and American swimmer Katie Ledecky are the only women to have won nine gold medals. She is also the only female athlete who at some point has held the record for most Olympic gold medals. Additionally, within the sport of gymnastics, she is the only woman who has won an all-around medal in more than two Olympiads, the only woman who has won an individual event (floor exercise) in more than two Olympiads, and one of only three women who have won every individual event at either the World Championship or Olympic level. She is the first female gymnast to have twice won team gold, all-around gold, and an event final gold at the same Olympics, having done so in 1956 and four years later, in 1960.

== Family ==
She was born to Pelageya Anisimovna Barabamyuk (1902–1975) and Semyon Andreevich Diriy (1906–1943), who died in the Battle of Stalingrad. Larisa was married three times. Her current husband is Yuri Izrailovich Feldman (b. 1938), a member of the Russian Academy of Electrotechnical Sciences and a former competitive cyclist. Her daughter from a former marriage, Tatyana Ivanovna Latynina (b. 1958), is a folk dancer. She was born only five months after her mother won a world all-around title, and seven months after her birth Latynina competed at the national championships. Latynina kept her pregnancy a secret, even from her coach. She also had a son.

== Retirement ==
Latynina announced her retirement after the 1966 World Championships and became a coach for the Soviet national gymnastics team, a position she held until 1977. Under her coaching the Soviet women team won gold in the 1968, 1972 and 1976 Olympics. She organized the gymnastics competition at the 1980 Olympic Games in Moscow.

She holds Russian citizenship and lives in Moscow. Latynina has received numerous Soviet and Russian state accolades.

In 2023, she spoke out against Russian athletes competing under a neutral flag at the Olympics due to the 2022 Russian invasion of Ukraine, calling it "unpatriotic".

== Awards and honors ==
1989: Olympic Order (silver), International Olympic Committee
1998: Inducted into the International Gymnastics Hall of Fame

== Competitive history ==
Year	Event	Team	AA	VT	UB	BB	FX
1954	USSR Championships		16	4		3rd place, bronze medalist(s)	
1954	World Championships	1st place, gold medalist(s)	14				5
1955	USSR Championships		2nd place, silver medalist(s)	2nd place, silver medalist(s)	2nd place, silver medalist(s)	2nd place, silver medalist(s)	3rd place, bronze medalist(s)
1955	USSR Cup		4				
1955	Warsaw International	1st place, gold medalist(s)	1st place, gold medalist(s)				
1956	Liberation Day International		1st place, gold medalist(s)				
1956	USSR Championships		4	1st place, gold medalist(s)	2nd place, silver medalist(s)		1st place, gold medalist(s)
1956	USSR Cup		1st place, gold medalist(s)				
1956	Olympic Games	1st place, gold medalist(s)	1st place, gold medalist(s)	1st place, gold medalist(s)	2nd place, silver medalist(s)	4	1st place, gold medalist(s)
1957	USSR Championships		2nd place, silver medalist(s)	4	2nd place, silver medalist(s)	5	1st place, gold medalist(s)
1957	USSR Cup		5				
1957	European Championships		1st place, gold medalist(s)	1st place, gold medalist(s)	1st place, gold medalist(s)	1st place, gold medalist(s)	1st place, gold medalist(s)
1957	Moscow Summer Sports Games	1st place, gold medalist(s)	1st place, gold medalist(s)				
1958	USSR Championships			1st place, gold medalist(s)	5	1st place, gold medalist(s)	1st place, gold medalist(s)
1958	World Championships	1st place, gold medalist(s)	1st place, gold medalist(s)	1st place, gold medalist(s)	1st place, gold medalist(s)	1st place, gold medalist(s)	2nd place, silver medalist(s)
1959	GDR-USSR Dual Meet	1st place, gold medalist(s)	3rd place, bronze medalist(s)				
1959	USSR Championships		4	2nd place, silver medalist(s)		5	
1960	USSR Championships		2nd place, silver medalist(s)	1st place, gold medalist(s)	2nd place, silver medalist(s)	5	3rd place, bronze medalist(s)
1960	USSR Cup		2nd place, silver medalist(s)				
1960	Olympic Games	1st place, gold medalist(s)	1st place, gold medalist(s)	3rd place, bronze medalist(s)	2nd place, silver medalist(s)	2nd place, silver medalist(s)	1st place, gold medalist(s)
1961	USA-USSR Dual Meet	1st place, gold medalist(s)	2nd place, silver medalist(s)	1st place, gold medalist(s)	2nd place, silver medalist(s)	3rd place, bronze medalist(s)	1st place, gold medalist(s)
1961	USSR-USA Dual Meet	1st place, gold medalist(s)	1st place, gold medalist(s)	1st place, gold medalist(s)	1st place, gold medalist(s)		1st place, gold medalist(s)
1961	European Championships		1st place, gold medalist(s)	4	2nd place, silver medalist(s)	2nd place, silver medalist(s)	1st place, gold medalist(s)
1961	USSR Championships		1st place, gold medalist(s)	2nd place, silver medalist(s)	1st place, gold medalist(s)	3rd place, bronze medalist(s)	3rd place, bronze medalist(s)
1961	USSR Cup		1st place, gold medalist(s)				
1962	USSR Championships		1st place, gold medalist(s)	3rd place, bronze medalist(s)	1st place, gold medalist(s)	6	2nd place, silver medalist(s)
1962	USSR Cup		2nd place, silver medalist(s)				
1962	World Championships	1st place, gold medalist(s)	1st place, gold medalist(s)	2nd place, silver medalist(s)	3rd place, bronze medalist(s)	2nd place, silver medalist(s)	1st place, gold medalist(s)
1963	USSR Championships		2nd place, silver medalist(s)		2nd place, silver medalist(s)	5	3rd place, bronze medalist(s)
1964	SWE-USSR Dual Meet	1st place, gold medalist(s)	4				
1964	USSR Championships		2nd place, silver medalist(s)	2nd place, silver medalist(s)	1st place, gold medalist(s)	4	
1964	USSR Cup		3rd place, bronze medalist(s)				
1964	Olympic Games	1st place, gold medalist(s)	2nd place, silver medalist(s)	2nd place, silver medalist(s)	3rd place, bronze medalist(s)	3rd place, bronze medalist(s)	1st place, gold medalist(s)
1965	USSR Championships		7				
1965	European Championships		2nd place, silver medalist(s)	3rd place, bronze medalist(s)	2nd place, silver medalist(s)	2nd place, silver medalist(s)	2nd place, silver medalist(s)
1966	USSR Championships				3rd place, bronze medalist(s)		
1966	USSR Cup		5				
1966	USSR World Trials		6				
1966	World Championships	2nd place, silver medalist(s)	11				

== See also ==
- List of multiple Olympic gold medalists
- List of multiple Olympic gold medalists at a single Games
- List of multiple Olympic medalists at a single Games
- List of multiple Summer Olympic medalists
- List of top Olympic gymnastics medalists
- List of top medalists at the World Artistic Gymnastics Championships
- List of Olympic female gymnasts for the Soviet Union
- List of women who won medals in every event at the World Artistic Gymnastics Championships

== Bibliography ==
- Larisa Latynina (1975). The Balance (in Russian). Moscow: Molodaya gvardiya. Archived from the original on 27 September 2007.

Records
Preceded by (Italy) Edoardo Mangiarotti	Most career Olympic medals 1964–2012	Succeeded by (United States) Michael Phelps
Preceded by (Hungary) Ágnes Keleti	Most career Olympic medals by a woman 1964 – current	Incumbent
