= Maria Floro =

American economics professor

Professor Maria S. Floro is professor emerita of Economics at American University in Washington, DC. She served, for the most part, as co-director of the Program on Gender Analysis in Economics (PGAE) since it was established in 2008.

Her publications include articles and co-authored books on informal credit markets, new institutional economics, gender and development strategies, vulnerability, food security and migration, and poverty.

She had served as the chair of the advisory board of the Economic and Social Costs of Violence Against Women and Girls Project based at National University of Ireland, and has been an advisory board member of the Women's Empowerment: Data for Gender Equality (WEDGE) Project based at University of Maryland. She led the William and Flora Hewlett Foundation and Open Society Foundations-supported Care Work and the Economy (CWE-GAM) Project involving 40 scholars around the world. She is Special Adviser of the Care Economy Africa Adaptation Project and part of the Care Economies in Context Project.
