= Gyöngyi Mák-Kovács =

Hungarian gymnast (b. 1940)

Personal information
- Nationality: Hungarian
- Born: 21 February 1940 (age 85); Budapest, Hungary

Sport
- Sport: Gymnastics

Gyöngyi Mák-Kovács (born 21 February 1940) is a Hungarian gymnast. She competed in six events at the 1964 Summer Olympics.
