= Pauline Gardiner (gymnast) =

New Zealand artistic gymnast

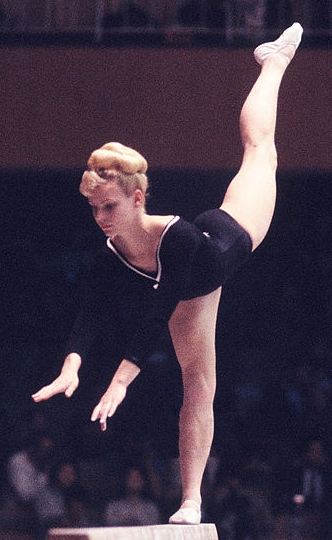
- Pauline Gardiner at the 1964 Olympics

Personal information
- Born: Pauline Margrit Gardiner; 11 October 1945 (age 80) Cambridge, New Zealand
- Height: 1.67 m (5 ft 6 in)
- Weight: 59 kg (130 lb)
- Relatives: Crispin Gardiner (brother); Helen May (sister-in-law)

Sport
- Country: New Zealand
- Sport: Artistic gymnastics

Pauline Margrit Gardiner (born 11 October 1945) is a retired artistic gymnast from New Zealand who competed at the 1964 Olympics.

== Career ==
She coached at University of California, Berkeley in the 1970s. She owned GyMarin Gymnastics Center and Gymnos in Marin County near San Francisco in the 1980s. She was a National level coach in Rhythmic Gymnastics. She was a member of the United States Gymnastic Federation board, representing Rhythmic Gymnastics.

She moved to England and continued to coach when her children were accepted to Oxford University in the 1990s. She returned to New Zealand and accepted a position with the New Zealand Gymnastics Federation in the late 1990s and early 2000s. She returned to the US in 2006. She has managed and coached gymnastics throughout her life. She was the general manager for Sokol Fort Worth gymnastics in Fort Worth, Texas until 2024.

== Personal life ==
She married an American gymnast in the late 1960s. She is the mother of three children. She later married gymnastics coach Rome Milan and lives in Texas.

Gardiner is a painter with work on display with the Art of the Olympians organization and program.
