= Elżbieta Apostolska =

Polish gymnast

Personal information
- Nationality: Polish
- Born: 28 March 1944 (age 81); Kraków, Poland

Sport
- Sport: Gymnastics

Elżbieta Rozalia Apostolska-Kamińska (born 28 March 1944) is a Polish gymnast. She competed in six events at the 1964 Summer Olympics.
