= Liliyana Aleksandrova =

Bulgarian gymnast (born 1943)

Personal information
- Nationality: Bulgarian
- Born: 26 February 1943 (age 82)

Sport
- Sport: Gymnastics

Liliyana Lyubenova Aleksandrova (Bulgarian: Лиляна Любенова Александрова) (born 26 February 1943) is a Bulgarian gymnast. She competed in five events at the 1964 Summer Olympics.
