= Denise Goddard =

British artistic gymnast (1945–2023)

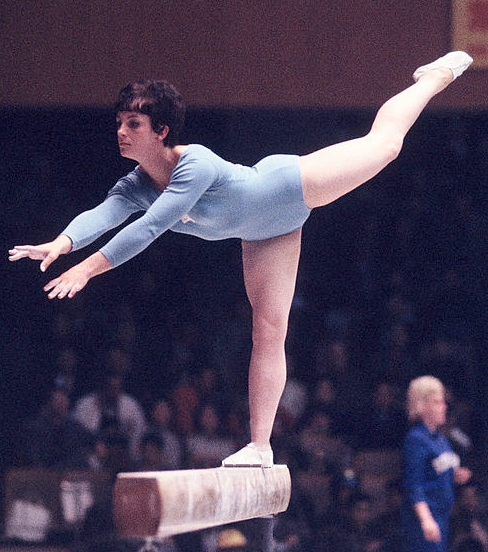
- Goddard at the 1964 Olympics

Personal information
- Born: 20 April 1945 Cardiff, Wales
- Died: 7 March 2023 (aged 77) Cardiff, Wales
- Height: 1.60 m (5 ft 3 in)
- Weight: 59 kg (130 lb)

Sport
- Sport: Artistic gymnastics
- Club: Cardiff Olympic Gymnastics Club

Denise Elizabeth Goddard (20 April 1945 – 7 March 2023) was a British artistic gymnast who competed at the 1964 Olympics.

Goddard died in March 2023, at the age of 77.
