= Gerda Bryłka =

Polish gymnast (born 1941)

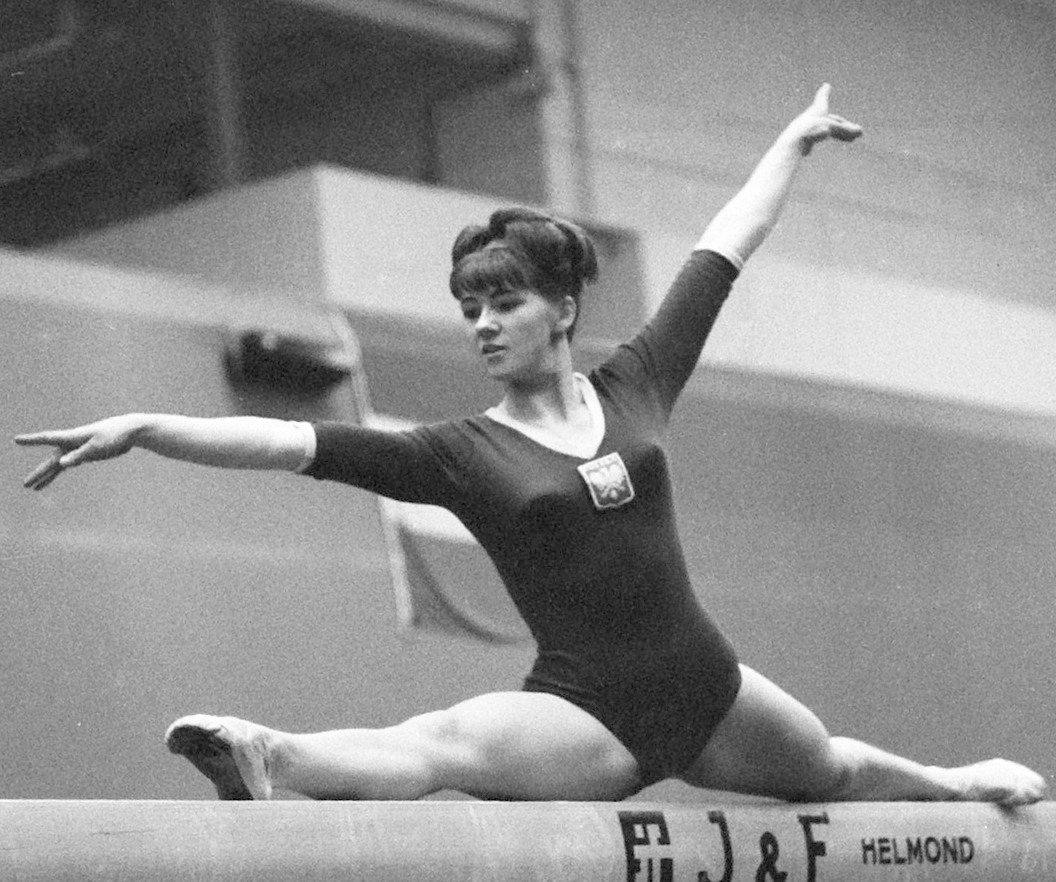
- Gerda Bryłka in 1965

Personal information
- Born: 12 August 1941 (age 85) Świętochłowice, Poland
- Height: 1.60 m (5 ft 3 in)
- Weight: 55 kg (121 lb)

Sport
- Sport: Artistic gymnastics
- Club: Zgody Świętochłowice

Gerda Elżbieta Bryłka (later Krajciczek, born 12 August 1941) is a retired Polish gymnast. She competed at the 1964 Summer Olympics in all artistic gymnastics events and finished in seventh place in the team competition. Her best individual result was 20th place in the floor exercise.
