= Tsagaandorjiin Gündegmaa =

Mongolian gymnast (born 1946)

Personal information
- Nationality: Mongolian
- Born: 6 February 1946 (age 79); Övörkhangai, Mongolia

Sport
- Sport: Gymnastics

Tsagaandorjiin Gündegmaa (born 6 February 1946) is a Mongolian gymnast. She competed at the 1964 Summer Olympics and the 1968 Summer Olympics.
