= Jeong Bong-sun =

South Korean gymnast

Personal information
- Nationality: South Korean
- Born: 27 May 1945 (age 79)

Sport
- Sport: Gymnastics

Jeong Bong-sun (born 27 May 1945) is a South Korean gymnast. She competed in five events at the 1964 Summer Olympics.
