= Evelyn Magluyan =

Filipino gymnast

- Born: September 5, 1944 (age 82)
- Height: 153 cm (5 ft 0 in)

Gymnastics career
- Discipline: Women's artistic gymnastics
- Country represented: Philippines

Evelyn G. Magluyan (born September 5, 1944) is a Filipino former artistic gymnast. She competed at the 1964 Summer Olympics.

== Career ==
When she was 20, Magluyan represented the Philippines at the 1964 Summer Olympics. Magluyan, Maria-Luisa Floro, Fortunato Payao, and Demetrio Pastrana were the first gymnasts who represented the Philippines at the Olympics. She only competed on the floor exercise and the balance beam, finishing 82nd and 83rd, respectively. After Magluyan and Floro's Olympic appearance, it would be another 60 years before the Philippines would compete in women's gymnastics at the Olympic Games.

== Personal life ==
Magluyan's nephew is Jo Koy, a Filipino American comedian.
