= Mária Tressel =

Hungarian gymnast

Personal information
- Nationality: Hungarian
- Born: 29 July 1946 Budapest, Hungary
- Died: 28 April 2020 (aged 73)

Sport
- Sport: Gymnastics

Mária Tressel (29 July 1946 – 28 April 2020) was a Hungarian gymnast. She competed in six events at the 1964 Summer Olympics.
