= Monique Baelden =

French gymnast

Personal information
- Nationality: French
- Born: 10 April 1938; Canton of Harnes, France
- Died: 17 November 2015 (aged 77); Épinay-sur-Orge, France

Sport
- Sport: Gymnastics

Monique Baelden (10 April 1938 – 17 November 2015) was a French gymnast. She competed in five events at the 1964 Summer Olympics, but never placed higher than 44th in any event.
