= Jamileh Sorouri =

Iranian gymnast (born 1950)

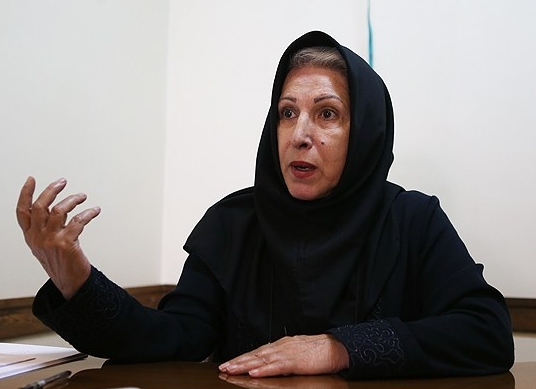
Portrait of Jamileh Sorouri

Jamileh Sorouri (Persian: جمیله سروری, born 8 March 1950) is an Iranian gymnast who participated in the 1964 Summer Olympics.
