= Janie Speaks =

American gymnast

Personal information
- Born: June 8, 1948 (age 76); Oklahoma City, Oklahoma, United States

Sport
- Sport: Gymnastics

Janie Speaks (born June 8, 1948) is an American gymnast. She competed in five events at the 1964 Summer Olympics.
