= Monica Rutherford =

English artistic gymnast (1944–2024)

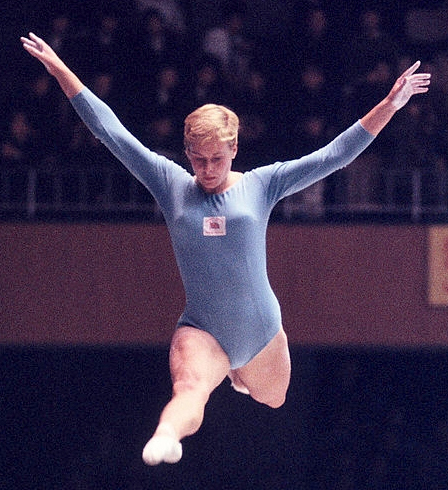
- Rutherford at the 1964 Olympics

Personal information
- Born: 29 March 1944 Sunderland, Tyne and Wear, England
- Died: December 2, 2024 (aged 80) Picauville, France
- Height: 1.60 m (5 ft 3 in)
- Weight: 61 kg (134 lb)

Sport
- Sport: Artistic gymnastics
- Club: Fulwell Gymnastics Club Sunderland

Monica Kathleen Rutherford (29 March 1944 – 2 December 2024) was an English artistic gymnast. She was four times British Champion and competed at the 1964 Summer Olympics in all artistic gymnastics events, with the best ranking of 59th on the vault.

After marrying Brian Phelps, an Olympic diver, she changed her last name to Phelps.

Following her career as a gymnast, Rutherford coached for many years at the OLGA club in Poole, Dorset.

In retirement, Rutherford resided in France. She died in Picauville, France on 2 December 2024, at the age of 80.
