= Barbara Stolz =

German artistic gymnast

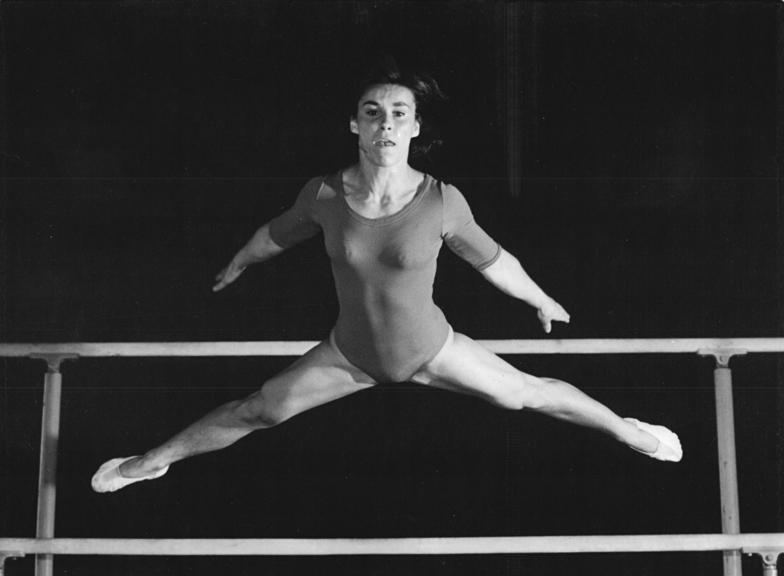
- Barbara Stolz in 1964

Personal information
- Born: 28 June 1941 (age 85) Döbeln, Germany
- Height: 1.53 m (5 ft 0 in)
- Weight: 51 kg (112 lb)

Sport
- Sport: Artistic gymnastics
- Club: SV Halle

Barbara Stolz (née Dix on 28 June 1941) is a retired German gymnast. She competed at the 1964 Summer Olympics in all artistic gymnastics events and finished in fourth place with the German team. Her best individual result was 39th place in the uneven bars.
