= Lyudmila Gromova =

Russian artistic gymnast

Personal information
- Born: 4 November 1942 (age 83) Miass, Russian SFSR, Soviet Union
- Height: 1.57 m (5 ft 2 in)
- Weight: 52 kg (115 lb)

Sport
- Sport: Artistic gymnastics
- Club: CSKA Moscow
Medal record
Representing the Soviet Union
Olympic Games
Gold medal – first place	1964 Tokyo	Team allround

Lyudmila Pavlovna Gromova (Russian: Людмила Павловна Громова; born 4 November 1942) is a retired artistic gymnast from Russia. She competed at the 1964 Summer Olympics in all artistic gymnastics events and won a gold medal in the team allround competition. Individually her best result was 16th place in the floor exercise.

She was born as Lyudmila Permyakova, then changed her last name to Gromova, and later to Aseeva. She has a sister, Valentina (b. 1947); they lost their father in World War II. In 1957, Lyudmila moved to Moscow, married, graduated from an institute of pedagogy in Moscow Oblast in 1975, and later worked as a gymnastics coach.
