= Karin Mannewitz =

German artistic gymnast

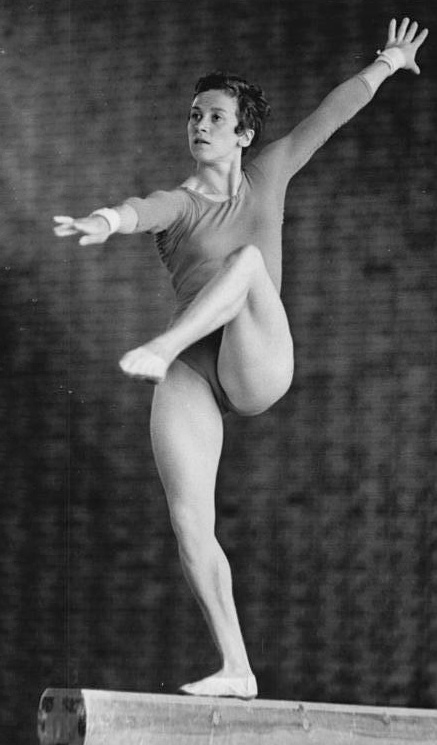
- Karin Mannewitz in 1964

Personal information
- Born: 15 November 1939 (age 86) Halle (Saale), Germany
- Height: 1.53 m (5 ft 0 in)
- Weight: 51 kg (112 lb)

Sport
- Sport: Artistic gymnastics
- Club: SV Halle

Karin Mannewitz (née Herbsleb on 15 November 1939) is a retired German gymnast. She competed at the 1964 Summer Olympics in all artistic gymnastics events and finished in fourth place with the German team. Her best individual result was 20th place in the uneven bars.
