= Hong Tai-kwai =

Taiwanese gymnast

Personal information
- Full name: 洪 丹桂, Pinyin: Hóng Dān-guì
- Nationality: Taiwanese
- Born: 8 December 1946 (age 79) Pingtung, Taiwan

Sport
- Sport: Gymnastics

Hong Tai-kwai (born 8 December 1946) is a Taiwanese gymnast. She competed at the 1964 Summer Olympics and the 1968 Summer Olympics.
