= Cristina Doboșan =

Romanian gymnast

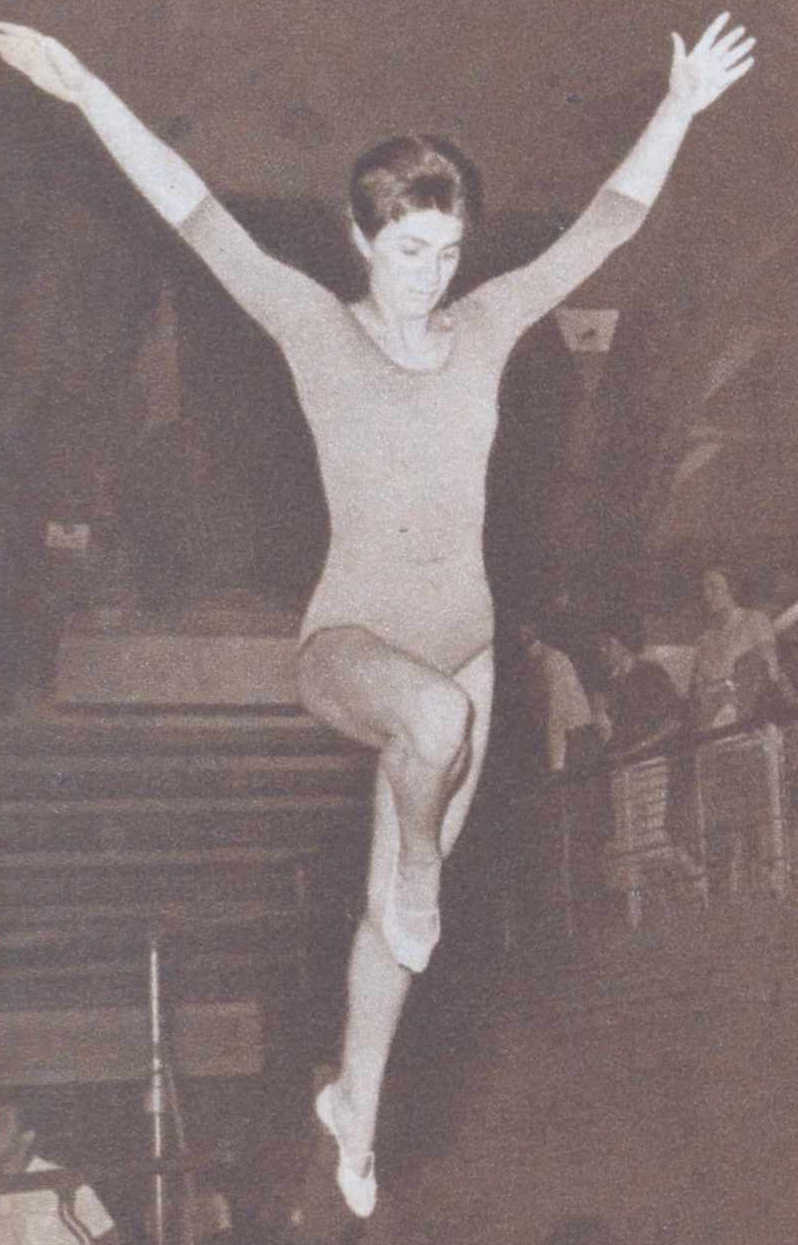
- Cristina Doboșan 1965

Personal information
- Nationality: Romanian
- Born: 22 May 1943 (age 82); Timișoara, Romania

Sport
- Sport: Gymnastics

Cristina Doboșan (born 22 May 1943) is a Romanian gymnast. She competed in six events at the 1964 Summer Olympics.
