= Veronica Grymonprez =

Belgian gymnast (born 1944)

Personal information
- Nationality: Belgian
- Born: 17 January 1944 (age 81); Berlin, Germany

Sport
- Sport: Gymnastics

Veronica Grymonprez (born 17 January 1944) is a Belgian gymnast. She competed at the 1960 Summer Olympics and the 1964 Summer Olympics.
