= Anne-Marie Lambert =

Swedish gymnast

Personal information
- Nationality: Swedish
- Born: 2 June 1945 (age 79); Stockholm, Sweden

Sport
- Sport: Gymnastics

Anne-Marie Lambert (born 2 June 1945) is a Swedish gymnast. She competed in six events at the 1964 Summer Olympics.
