= Małgorzata Wilczek =

Polish gymnast

Personal information
- Nationality: Polish
- Born: 9 March 1944 (age 81); Świętochłowice, Poland

Sport
- Sport: Gymnastics

Małgorzata Wilczek (born 9 March 1944) is a Polish gymnast. She competed in six events at the 1964 Summer Olympics.
