= Choi Yeong-suk =

South Korean gymnast

Personal information
- Nationality: South Korean
- Born: 14 May 1947 (age 78)

Sport
- Sport: Gymnastics

- Choi Yeong-suk
- Hangul: 최영숙
- Hanja: 崔永淑
- RR: Choe Yeongsuk
- MR: Ch'oe Yŏngsuk

Choi Yeong-suk (born 14 May 1947) is a South Korean gymnast. She competed in five events at the 1964 Summer Olympics.
