= Gail Daley =

Canadian artistic gymnast

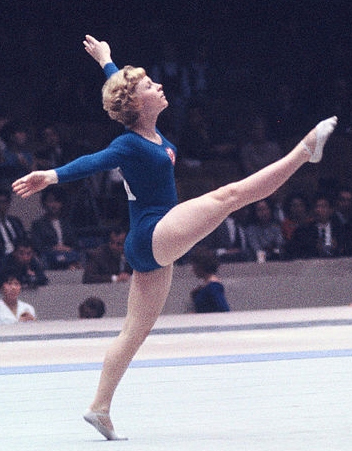
- Daley at the 1964 Summer Olympics

Personal information
- Born: April 5, 1946 (age 80) Saskatoon, Saskatchewan, Canada
- Height: 156 cm (5 ft 1 in)
- Weight: 47 kg (104 lb)

Sport
- Sport: Artistic gymnastics
Medal record
Representing Canada
Pan American Games
Silver medal – second place	1963 São Paulo	Team
Bronze medal – third place	1963 São Paulo	Balance beam

Gail Marion Daley (born April 5, 1946) is a Canadian retired artistic gymnast who competed at the 1964 Olympics. She won two medals at the 1963 Pan American Games and four national titles starting from 1962.
