= Jan Bedford =

Australian gymnast

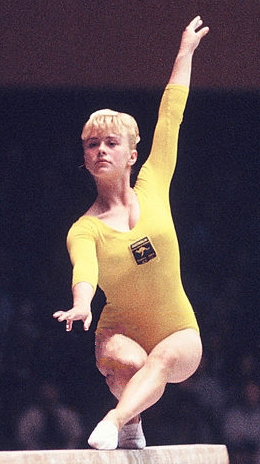
- Bedford at the 1964 Olympics

Personal information
- Full name: Janice May Bedford
- Nationality: Australian
- Born: 15 May 1945 (age 81)
- Height: 1.51 m (4 ft 11 in)
- Weight: 51 kg (112 lb)

Sport
- Sport: Artistic gymnastics
- Club: Swan Girls Amateur Gymnastics Club

Janice May "Jan" Bedford (born 15 May 1945), also known as Janice Pyke, is a retired Australian gymnast. She competed at the 1964 Summer Olympics in all artistic gymnastics events and finished in 10th place with the Australian team. Her best individual results were 62nd places on the floor and balance beam.
