= Yadamsürengiin Tuyaa =

Mongolian artistic gymnast (born 1947)

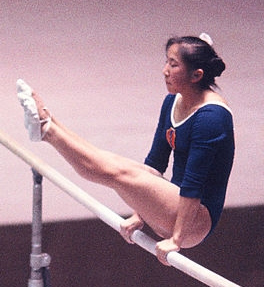
- Yadamsürengiin Tuyaa at the 1964 Olympics

Personal information
- Born: Ядамсүрэнгийн Туяа; 6 November 1947 (age 78) Ulaanbaatar, Mongolia
- Height: 1.54 m (5 ft 1 in)
- Weight: 52 kg (115 lb)

Sport
- Sport: Artistic gymnastics

Yadamsürengiin Tuyaa (born 6 November 1947) is a retired Mongolian gymnast. She competed at the 1964 and 1968 Summer Olympics in all individual artistic gymnastics events. Her greatest athletic achievement was placing in 48th on the balance beam at 1968 Olympics.
