= Dorota Miler =

Polish gymnast

Personal information
- Nationality: Polish
- Born: 1 February 1944 (age 82) Nowy Bytom, Poland

Sport
- Sport: Gymnastics

Dorota Miler (born 1 February 1944) is a Polish gymnast. She competed in six events at the 1964 Summer Olympics.
