= Barbara Fletcher =

Australian gymnast

Personal information
- Nationality: Australian
- Born: 15 May 1943 (age 83)

Sport
- Sport: Gymnastics

Barbara Fletcher (born 15 May 1943) is an Australian gymnast. She competed in six events at the 1964 Summer Olympics.
