= Lee Deok-bun =

South Korean gymnast (born 1945)

Personal information
- Nationality: South Korean
- Born: 12 December 1945 (age 80)

Sport
- Sport: Gymnastics

Lee Deok-bun (born 12 December 1945) is a South Korean gymnast. She competed in five events at the 1964 Summer Olympics.
