= Kaarina Koskinen =

Finnish gymnast

Personal information
- Nationality: Finnish
- Born: 20 April 1944 (age 82) Turku, Finland

Sport
- Sport: Gymnastics

Kaarina Koskinen (born 20 April 1944) is a Finnish gymnast. She competed in five events at the 1964 Summer Olympics.
