= Barbara Cage =

Australian gymnast

Personal information
- Full name: Barbara Anne Cage
- Nationality: Australian
- Born: 26 September 1941; Southport, Queensland, Australia
- Died: 16 September 1997 (aged 55); Brisbane, Queensland, Australia

Sport
- Sport: Gymnastics

Barbara Anne Cage (26 September 1941 – 16 September 1997), also known as Barbara McCarthy, was an Australian gymnast. She competed in six events at the 1964 Summer Olympics.
