= Christel Felgner =

German artistic gymnast

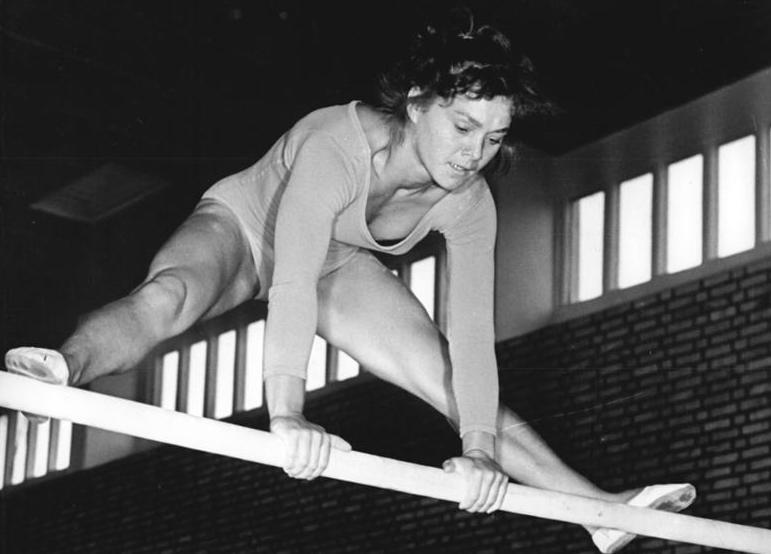
- Felgner in 1964

Personal information
- Born: 25 July 1942 (age 83) Halle (Saale), Germany
- Height: 1.56 m (5 ft 1 in)
- Weight: 50 kg (110 lb)

Sport
- Sport: Artistic gymnastics
- Club: SV Halle

Christel Felgner (born 25 July 1942) is a retired German gymnast. She competed at the 1964 Summer Olympics in all artistic gymnastics events and finished in fourth place with the German team. Her best individual result was 30th place in the vault. From 1966 she competed under the name Christel Wunder-Felgner.
