= Rowing at the 1964 Summer Olympics – Men's coxed four =

Men's coxed four at the Games of the XVIII Olympiad
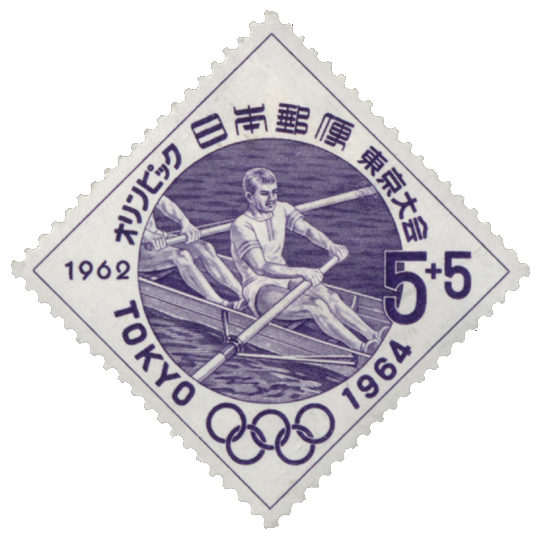
- Japan stamp commemorating rowing at the 1964 Olympics
- Venue: Toda Rowing Course
- Dates: 11–15 October 1964
- Competitors: 80 from 16 nations
- Winning time: 7:00.44

Medalists
1st place, gold medalist(s)		United Team of Germany: Peter Neusel; Bernhard Britting; Joachim Werner; Egbert Hirschfelder; Jürgen Oelke (cox)
2nd place, silver medalist(s)		Italy: Renato Bosatta; Emilio Trivini; Giuseppe Galante; Franco De Pedrina; Giovanni Spinola (cox)
3rd place, bronze medalist(s)		Netherlands: Lex Mullink; Jan van de Graaff; Freek van de Graaff; Bobbie van de Graaf; Marius Klumperbeek (cox)

The men's coxed four event was a rowing event conducted as part of the Rowing at the 1964 Summer Olympics programme. It was held from 11 to 15 October. There were 16 boats (80 competitors) from 16 nations, with each nation limited to a single boat in the event. The event was won by the United Team of Germany, the nation's second consecutive victory in the men's coxed four (though with an entirely new crew from 1960). The two medals placed the United Team of Germany in a tie for second-most all-time with Switzerland and Italy; Germany had the most with four. Italy earned its third straight medal in the event, all of different colours, with a silver in Tokyo (also with an entirely different crew in 1964 than 1960). The bronze medal went to the Netherlands, the nation's first medal in the event since 1900.

== Background ==
This was the 12th appearance of the event. Rowing had been on the programme in 1896 but was cancelled due to bad weather. The coxed four was one of the four initial events introduced in 1900. It was not held in 1904 or 1908, but was held at every Games from 1912 to 1992 when it (along with the men's coxed pair) was replaced with the men's lightweight double sculls and men's lightweight coxless four.

The United Team of Germany had won the 1960 Olympics and West Germany had won the 1961 European championships, the 1962 World Championship, and the 1963 European championships; the West German crew (the same five who won the 1963 European title) that competed for the United Team here was heavily favoured. However, they had been beaten two months before the Olympics at the 1964 European championships by the Soviet Union, which sent the same team to Tokyo.

For the second time in three Games, no nations made their debut in the event. The United States made its 10th appearance, most among nations to that point.

== Competition format ==
The coxed four event featured five-person boats, with four rowers and a coxswain. It was a sweep rowing event, with the rowers each having one oar (and thus each rowing on one side). The competition used the 2000 metres distance that became standard at the 1912 Olympics and which has been used ever since except at the 1948 Games.

The 1964 tournament introduced the "B" final, a consolation final that ranked rowers that had not qualified for the main, or "A", final. Six boats had become a standard final size in 1960 and continued here. This rowing competition consisted of two main rounds (semifinals and finals), as well as a repechage round that allowed teams that did not win their heats to advance to the semifinals.

- Semifinals: Three heats, 5 or 6 boats per heat. The winner of each heat (3 boats total) advanced directly to Final A; the remaining boats (13 total) went to the repechage.
- Repechage: Three heats, 4 or 5 boats per heat. The winner of each heat (3 boats) advanced to Final A; second- and third-place boats in each heat (6 boats) went to Final B; other boats (4 total) were eliminated.
- Finals: Two finals. Final A awarded the medals and 4th through 6th places; Final B was a consolation final for 7th through 12th place.

== Schedule ==
All times are Japan Standard Time (UTC+9)

Date	Time	Round
Sunday, 11 October 1964	10:00	Semifinals
Monday, 12 October 1964	14:00	Repechage
Wednesday, 14 October 1964	14:00	Final B
Thursday, 15 October 1964	13:30	Final A

== Results ==
=== Semifinals ===
The top crew in each heat advanced to the "A" final, with all others were sent to the repechages.

==== Semifinal 1 ====
Rank	Rowers	Coxswain	Nation	Time	Notes
1	Peter Neusel; Bernhard Britting; Joachim Werner; Egbert Hirschfelder	Jürgen Oelke	United Team of Germany	6:44.12	QA
2	Paul Gunderson; Hughie Pollock; Tom Pollock; Jim Tew	Ted Washburn	United States	6:48.19	R
3	Karel Karafiát; Jaroslav Starosta; René Líbal; Jan Štefan	Arnošt Poisl	Czechoslovakia	6:55.59	R
4	Gary Herford; Alf Duval; Mick Allen; John Campbell	Alan Grover	Australia	7:00.16	R
5	Hideo Oe; Yukio Matsuda; Hideaki Aida; Masakatsu Yamanouchi	Noriichi Yoshino	Japan	7:10.77	R
6	Osvaldo Díaz; Alfredo Hernández; Gilberto Campbell; Leovigildo Millan	Roberto Ojeda	Cuba	7:17.11	R

==== Semifinal 2 ====
Rank	Rowers	Coxswain	Nation	Time	Notes
1	Renato Bosatta; Emilio Trivini; Giuseppe Galante; Franco De Pedrina	Giovanni Spinola	Italy	6:47.06	QA
2	Lex Mullink; Jan van de Graaff; Freek van de Graaff; Marius Klumperbeek	Bobbie van der Graaf	Netherlands	6:48.72	R
3	Darien Boswell; Alistair Dryden; Peter Masfen; Dudley Storey	Robert Page	New Zealand	6:50.81	R
4	Tor Ahlsand; Birger Knudtzon; Eilif Brodtkorb; Ingolf Kristiansen	Rolf Syversen	Norway	6:57.35	R
5	Mahmoud Shehata; Salem Mashour; Ibrahim Sayed Sabri; Mohamed Eissa	Abdullah Ali	Egypt	7:28.96	R

==== Semifinal 3 ====
Rank	Rowers	Coxswain	Nation	Time	Notes
1	Anatoliy Tkachuk; Vitaly Kurdchenko; Boris Kuzmin; Vladimir Yevseyev	Anatoly Luzgin	Soviet Union	6:45.35	QA
2	Yves Fraisse; Claude Pache; Gérard Jacquesson; Michel Dumas	Jean-Claude Darouy	France	6:53.52	R
3	Szczepan Grajczyk; Marian Leszczyński; Ryszard Lubicki; Andrzej Nowaczyk	Jerzy Pawłowski	Poland	6:58.64	R
4	Teppo Kesäläinen; Kauko Hänninen; Pekka Sylvander; Mauno Maisala	Ismo Kanerva	Finland	7:03.85	R
5	Niels Nielsen; Poul Erik Nielsen; Ole Paustian; Tom Hinsby	Bent Larsen	Denmark	7:04.48	R

=== Repechage ===
The top finisher in each of the three repechage heats joined the "A" finalists. The second and third-place finishers competed in a consolation final for 7th to 12th places. All other crews were eliminated.

==== Repechage heat 1 ====
Rank	Rowers	Coxswain	Nation	Time	Notes
1	Szczepan Grajczyk; Marian Leszczyński; Ryszard Lubicki; Andrzej Nowaczyk	Jerzy Pawłowski	Poland	7:11.74	QA
2	Paul Gunderson; Hughie Pollock; Tom Pollock; Jim Tew	Ted Washburn	United States	7:12.82	QB
3	Tor Ahlsand; Birger Knudtzon; Eilif Brodtkorb; Ingolf Kristiansen	Rolf Syversen	Norway	7:18.57	QB
4	Mahmoud Shehata; Salem Mashour; Ibrahim Sayed Sabri; Mohamed Eissa	Abdullah Ali	Egypt	10:44.94	

==== Repechage heat 2 ====
Rank	Rowers	Coxswain	Nation	Time	Notes
1	Lex Mullink; Jan van de Graaff; Freek van de Graaff; Marius Klumperbeek	Bobbie van der Graaf	Netherlands	7:04.85	QA
2	Niels Nielsen; Poul Erik Nielsen; Ole Paustian; Tom Hinsby	Bent Larsen	Denmark	7:12.45	QB
3	Karel Karafiát; Jaroslav Starosta; René Líbal; Jan Štefan	Arnošt Poisl	Czechoslovakia	7:12.91	QB
4	Teppo Kesäläinen; Kauko Hänninen; Pekka Sylvander; Mauno Maisala	Ismo Kanerva	Finland	7:21.16	
—	Osvaldo Díaz; Alfredo Hernández; Gilberto Campbell; Leovigildo Millan	Roberto Ojeda	Cuba	DNS	

==== Repechage heat 3 ====
Rank	Rowers	Coxswain	Nation	Time	Notes
1	Yves Fraisse; Claude Pache; Gérard Jacquesson; Michel Dumas	Jean-Claude Darouy	France	7:05.78	QA
2	Darien Boswell; Alistair Dryden; Peter Masfen; Dudley Storey	Robert Page	New Zealand	7:09.26	QB
3	Gary Herford; Alf Duval; Mick Allen; John Campbell	Alan Grover	Australia	7:17.06	QB
4	Hideo Oe; Yukio Matsuda; Hideaki Aida; Masakatsu Yamanouchi	Noriichi Yoshino	Japan	7:31.60	

=== Finals ===
==== Final B ====
The consolation final determined places from 7th to 12th.

Rank	Rowers	Coxswain	Nation	Time
7	Paul Gunderson; Hughie Pollock; Tom Pollock; Jim Tew	Ted Washburn	United States	6:43.68
8	Darien Boswell; Alistair Dryden; Peter Masfen; Dudley Storey	Robert Page	New Zealand	6:45.16
9	Tor Ahlsand; Birger Knudtzon; Eilif Brodtkorb; Ingolf Kristiansen	Rolf Syversen	Norway	6:48.38
10	Gary Herford; Alf Duval; Mick Allen; John Campbell	Alan Grover	Australia	6:48.45
11	Niels Nielsen; Poul Erik Nielsen; Ole Paustian; Tom Hinsby	Bent Larsen	Denmark	6:52.83
12	Karel Karafiát; Jaroslav Starosta; René Líbal; Jan Štefan	Arnošt Poisl	Czechoslovakia	DNS

==== Final A ====
Rank	Rowers	Coxswain	Nation	Time
1st place, gold medalist(s)	Peter Neusel; Bernhard Britting; Joachim Werner; Egbert Hirschfelder	Jürgen Oelke	United Team of Germany	7:00.44
2nd place, silver medalist(s)	Renato Bosatta; Emilio Trivini; Giuseppe Galante; Franco De Pedrina	Giovanni Spinola	Italy	7:02.84
3rd place, bronze medalist(s)	Lex Mullink; Jan van de Graaff; Freek van de Graaff; Marius Klumperbeek	Bobbie van der Graaf	Netherlands	7:06.46
4	Yves Fraisse; Claude Pache; Gérard Jacquesson; Michel Dumas	Jean-Claude Darouy	France	7:13.92
5	Anatoliy Tkachuk; Vitaly Kurdchenko; Boris Kuzmin; Vladimir Yevseyev	Anatoly Luzgin	Soviet Union	7:16.05
6	Szczepan Grajczyk; Marian Leszczyński; Ryszard Lubicki; Andrzej Nowaczyk	Jerzy Pawłowski	Poland	7:28.15

== Sources ==
- Tokyo Organizing Committee (1964). The Games of the XVIII Olympiad: Tokyo 1964, vol. 2.
