= Poland at the 1964 Summer Olympics =

- IOC code: POL
- NOC: Polish Olympic Committee

in Tokyo, Japan 10 October 1964 – 24 October 1964
- Competitors: 140 in 12 sports
- Flag bearer: Waldemar Baszanowski
- Medals Ranked 7th: Gold 7 Silver 6 Bronze 10 Total 23

Summer Olympics appearances (overview)
- 1924; 1928; 1932; 1936; 1948; 1952; 1956; 1960; 1964; 1968; 1972; 1976; 1980; 1984; 1988; 1992; 1996; 2000; 2004; 2008; 2012; 2016; 2020; 2024

Other related appearances
- Russian Empire (1900, 1912); Austria (1908–1912)

Poland competed at the 1964 Summer Olympics in Tokyo, Japan. 140 competitors, 115 men and 25 women, took part in 87 events in 12 sports.

== Medalists ==
=== Gold ===
- Józef Szmidt — Athletics, Men's Triple jump
- Teresa Ciepły, Irena Kirszenstein, Halina Górecka, Ewa Kłobukowska — Athletics, Women's 4×100 metres relay
- Jozef Grudzien, — Boxing, Men's Lightweight
- Jerzy Kulej — Boxing, Men's Light welterweight
- Marian Kasprzyk — Boxing, Men's Welterweight
- Egon Franke — Fencing, Men's Foil Individual
- Waldemar Baszanowski — Weightlifting, Men's Lightweight (67.5 kg)

=== Silver ===
- Andrzej Zieliński, Wiesław Maniak, Marian Foik, Marian Dudziak — Athletics, Men's 4×100 metres relay
- Teresa Ciepły — Athletics, Women's 80 metres hurdles
- Irena Kirszenstein — Athletics, Women's 200 metres
- Irena Kirszenstein — Athletics, Women's Long jump
- Artur Olech — Boxing, Men's Flyweight
- Witold Woyda, Zbigniew Skrudlik, Ryszard Parulski, Egon Franke, Janusz Rozycki — Fencing, Men's Foil Team

=== Bronze ===
- Andrzej Badeński — Athletics, Men's 400 metres
- Ewa Kłobukowska — Athletics, Women's 100 metres
- Józef Grzesiak — Boxing, Men's Light middleweight
- Tadeusz Walasek — Boxing, Men's Middleweight
- Zbigniew Pietrzykowski — Boxing, Men's Light heavyweight
- Emil Ochyra, Jerzy Pawłowski, Ryszard Zub, Andrzej Piatkowski, Wojciech Zabłocki — Fencing, Men's Sabre Team
- Krystyna Czajkowska, Josefa Ledwignowa, Maria Golimowska, Jadwiga Rutkowska, Danuta Kordaczuk, Krystyna Jakubowska, Jadwiga Marko, Maria Sliwkowa, Zofia Szczesniewska, Krystina Krupowa, Hanna Krystyna Busz and Barbara Hermela-Niemczyk — Volleyball, Women's Team Competition
- Mieczysław Nowak — Weightlifting, Men's Featherweight (60 kg)
- Marian Zieliński — Weightlifting, Men's Lightweight (67.5 kg)
- Ireneusz Paliński — Weightlifting, Men's Middle heavyweight (90 kg)

== Athletics ==
Men
Track & road events

Athlete	Event	Heat		Quarterfinal		Semifinal		Final	
Athlete	Event	Result	Rank	Result	Rank	Result	Rank	Result	Rank
Andrzej Badeński	400 m	46.4	1 Q	46.5	1 Q	46.2	2 Q	45.6	Bronze medal
Witold Baran	1500 m	3:45.3	1 Q	—N/a		3:38.9	2 Q	3:40.3	6
Lech Boguszewicz	5000 m	13:52.8	4	Did not advance					
Marian Dudziak	100 m	10.6	1 Q	10.5	6	Did not advance			
Marian Foik	200 m	21.1	1 Q	21.0	2 Q	20.9	4 Q	20.8	6
Boguslaw Gierajewski	400 m hurdles	52.80	5	Did not advance					
Ireneusz Kluczek	400 m	47.3	4 Q	DNS	Did not advance				
Wiesław Maniak	100 m	10.5	1 Q	10.3	2 Q	10.1	2 Q	10.4	4
Mieczysław Rutyna	20 km walk	—N/a						1:48:41	26
Mieczysław Rutyna	50 km walk	—N/a						DSQ	
Stanisław Swatowski	400 m	47.6	5	Did not advance					
Zbigniew Syka	100 m	10.7	5	Did not advance					
Edward Szklarczyk	3000 m steeplechase	8:48.0	8	—N/a				Did not advance	
Andrzej Zieliński	200 m	21.2	2 Q	21.5	5	Did not advance			
Andrzej Zieliński; Wiesław Maniak; Marian Foik; Marian Dudziak	4 × 100 m relay	39.9	2 Q	—N/a		39.6	2 Q	39.3	Silver medal
Marian Filipiuk; Ireneusz Kluczek; Stanisław Swatowski; Andrzej Badeński	4 × 400 m relay	3:07.2	2 Q	—N/a				3:05.3	6

Field events

Athlete	Event	Qualification		Final	
Athlete	Event	Distance	Position	Distance	Position
Zenon Begier	Discus throw	56.31	7 Q	57.06	6
Olgierd Ciepły	Hammer throw	63.66	14 Q	64.83	8
Edward Czernik	High jump	2.06	1 Q	2.06	11
Jan Jaskólski	Triple jump	16.10	6 Q	15.82	12
Władysław Komar	Shot Put	18.05	6 Q	18.20	9
Władysław Nikiciuk	Javelin throw	73.45	8 q	73.11	9
Edmund Piątkowski	Shot Put	DNS		Did not advance	
Edmund Piątkowski	Discus throw	55.22	9 q	55.81	7
Tadeusz Rut	Hammer throw	65.03	6 Q	64.52	10
Janusz Sidło	Javelin throw	76.93	2 q	80.17	4
Zdzislaw Smolinski	Hammer throw	66.00	4 Q	62.90	14
Włodzimierz Sokołowski	Pole vault	NM	28	Did not advance	
Alfred Sosgórnik	Shot Put	17.06	10 Q	17.57	6
Andrzej Stalmach	Long jump	7.46	10 q	7.26	8
Józef Szmidt	Triple jump	16.18	5	16.85 OR	Gold medal

Women
Track & road events

Athlete	Event	Heat		Quarterfinal		Semifinal		Final	
Athlete	Event	Result	Rank	Result	Rank	Result	Rank	Result	Rank
Teresa Ciepły-Wieczorek	80 m hurdles	10.7	3 Q	—N/a		10.7	2 Q	10.5	Silver medal
Halina Richter-Górecka	100 m	11.5	2 Q	11.5	2 Q	11.7	4 Q	11.8	7
Halina Richter-Górecka	200 m	DNS		Did not advance					
Irena Kirszenstein	200 m	23.8	1 Q	—N/a		23.6	2 Q	23.1	Silver medal
Ewa Kłobukowska	100 m	11.5	1 Q	11.4	1 Q	11.4	2 Q	11.6	Bronze medal
Maria Piątkowska	80 m hurdles	10.6	1 Q	—N/a		10.7	4 Q	10.7	6
Barbara Sobotta	100 m	11.8	2 Q	11.8	5	Did not advance			
Barbara Sobotta	200 m	24.1	2 Q	—N/a		23.7	4 Q	23.9	6
Teresa Ciepły-Wieczorek; Irena Kirszenstein; Halina Richter-Górecka; Ewa Kłobukowska	4 × 100 m relay	44.6	1 Q	—N/a				43.6 WR	Gold medal

Field events

Athlete	Event	Qualification		Final	
Athlete	Event	Distance	Position	Distance	Position
Jarosława Bieda	High jump	1.70	5 Q	1.71	10
Irena Kirszenstein	Long jump	6.43	3 Q	6.60	Silver medal

== Basketball ==
=== Group A ===
Qualified for the semifinals

Team	W	L	PF	PA	PD	Pts	Tie
Soviet Union	7	0	562	424	+138	14	
Puerto Rico	5	2	493	454	+39	12	
Poland	4	3	467	448	+19	11	1W−0L
Italy	4	3	495	480	+15	11	0W−1L
Mexico	3	4	485	514	−29	10	1W−0L
Japan	3	4	421	428	−7	10	0W−1L
Hungary	2	5	407	469	−62	9	
Canada	0	7	408	521	−113	7	

11 October

13:30

Poland	56–53	Hungary

Yoyogi National Gymnasium, Tokyo

12 October

12:00

Poland	81–57	Japan

Yoyogi National Gymnasium, Tokyo

13 October

12:00

Italy	58–61	Poland

Yoyogi National Gymnasium, Tokyo

14 October

20:30

Mexico	71–70	Poland

Yoyogi National Gymnasium, Tokyo

16 October

20:30

Puerto Rico	66–60	Poland

Yoyogi National Gymnasium, Tokyo

17 October

12:00

Soviet Union	74–65	Poland

Yoyogi National Gymnasium, Tokyo

18 October

10:00

Poland	74–69	Canada

Yoyogi National Gymnasium, Tokyo

=== Classification brackets ===
5th–8th Place

20 October

10:00

Poland	82–69	Uruguay

Yoyogi National Gymnasium, Tokyo

5th Place

22 October

10:00

Italy	79–59	Poland

Yoyogi National Gymnasium, Tokyo

== Boxing ==
Men

Athlete	Event	First round	Second round	Third round	Quarterfinals	Semifinals	Final	
Athlete	Event	Opposition Result	Opposition Result	Opposition Result	Opposition Result	Opposition Result	Rank	
Artur Olech	Flyweight	—N/a	Stefan Panayotov (BUL); W 3–2	John Kamau (KEN); W 5–0	Constantin Ciucă (ROU); W 5–0	Stanislav Sorokin (URS); W WO	Fernando Atzori (ITA); W 1–4	Silver medal
Brunon Bendig	Bantamweight	—N/a	Rainer Poser (EUA); W 3–2	Karimu Young (NGR); L 2–3	Did not advance			
Piotr Gutman	Featherweight	—N/a	Pat Fitzsimmons (IRL); W 5–0	Masataka Takayama (JPN); W RSC	Anthony Villanueva (PHI); L RSC	Did not advance		5
Jozef Grudzien	Lightweight	BYE	Tauno Halonen (FIN); W 4–1	Alex Oundo (KEN); W 4–1	Stoyan Pilitchev (BUL); W 5–0	Ronald Allen Harris (USA); W 4–1	Vellikton Barannikov (URS); W 5–0	Gold medal
Jerzy Kulej	Light welterweight	BYE	Roberto Amaya (ARG); W 5–0	Richard McTaggart (GBR); W 4–1	Iosif Mihalic (ROU); W 4–1	Edie Blay (GHA); W 5–0	Yevgeny Frolov (URS); W 5–0	Gold medal
Marian Kasprzyk	Welterweight	—N/a	Misael Vilugron (CHI); W 3–2	Sikuru Alimi (NGR); W 5–0	Hamada Kichijiro (JPN); W 5–0	Silvano Bertini (ITA); W 3–2	Rikardas Tamulis (URS); W 4–1	Gold medal
Jozef Grzesiak	Light middleweight	—N/a	Massimo Bruschini (ITA); W 5–0	Kurt Mattsson (FIN); W 5–0	Vasile Mirza (ROU); W 4–1	Boris Lagutin (URS); L 1–4	Did not advance	Bronze medal
Tadeusz Walasek	Middleweight	—N/a	John Bukowski (AUS); W 5–0	Juan Aguilar (ARG); W 5–0	Ahmed Hassan (EGY); W 5–0	Valery Popenchenko (URS); L KO	Did not advance	Bronze medal
Zbigniew Pietrzykowski	Light heavyweight	—N/a	BYE	Ronald Holmes (JAM); W DQ	Rafael Gargiulo (ARG); W 5–0	Aleksei Kiselyov (URS); L 1–4	Did not advance	Bronze medal
Władysław Jędrzejewski	Heavyweight	—N/a		Vadim Yemelyanov (URS); L RSC	Did not advance			

== Canoeing ==
=== Sprint ===
Men

Athlete	Event	Heats		Repechages		Semifinals		Final	
Athlete	Event	Time	Rank	Time	Rank	Time	Rank	Time	Rank
Władysław Szuszkiewicz	K-1 1000 m	4:06.48	1 Q	BYE		4:08.51	4	Did not advance	
Stefan Kapłaniak; Władysław Zieliński	K-2 1000 m	3:47.71	4 R	3:52.49	3 Q	3:49.24	4	Did not advance	
Stanislaw Jankowiak; Rafal Piszcz; Robert Ruszkowski; Ryszard Marchlik	K-4 1000 m	3:28.14	5 R	3:22.84	2 Q	3:25.43	4	Did not advance	

Women

Athlete	Event	Heats		Semifinals		Final	
Athlete	Event	Time	Rank	Time	Rank	Time	Rank
Daniela Walkowiak	K-1 500 m	2:13.38	5 q	2:14.71	2 Q	2:17.52	7
Daniela Walkowiak; Izabella Antonowicz	K-2 500 m	2:05.86	5 q	2:11.02	2 Q	2:04.31	8

== Cycling ==
Eight cyclists represented Poland in 1964.

=== Road ===
Athlete	Event	Time	Rank
Jan Kudra	Men's road race	4:39:51.74	13
Jan Magiera	Men's road race	4:39:51.77	44
Andrzej Bławdzin	Men's road race	4:39:51.83	77
Rajmund Zieliński	Men's road race	4:39:51.83	82
Andrzej Bławdzin; Józef Beker; Jan Magiera; Rajmund Zieliński	Team time trial	2:31:44.70	11

=== Track ===
1000m time trial

Athlete	Event	Time	Rank
Wacław Latocha	Men's 1000m time trial	1:11.12	7

Men's Sprint

Athlete	Event	Heats	Repechage 1	Repechage Finals	Round 2	Repechage 2	Repechage Finals	Quarterfinals	Semifinals	Final	
Athlete	Event	Time Speed (km/h)	Rank	Opposition Time Speed (km/h)	Opposition Time Speed (km/h)	Opposition Time Speed (km/h)	Opposition Time Speed (km/h)	Opposition Time Speed (km/h)	Opposition Time Speed (km/h)	Opposition Time Speed (km/h)	Rank
Zbysław Zając	Men's sprint	Vanegas (COL); Johnson (AUS); L	Văn Châu (VIE); Billing (IND); W 12.31	Garcia (ARG); W 12.09	Khitrov (URS); Pettenella (ITA); W 12.06	BYE		Morelon (FRA); L	Did not advance		

Pursuit

Athlete	Event	Round of 16	Quarterfinals	Semifinals	Final	
Athlete	Event	Time	Rank	Opposition Time	Opposition Time	Opposition Time
Lucjan Józefowicz	Men's individual pursuit	Giorgio Ursi (ITA); L 5:05.01 QQ	Jiří Daler (TCH); L 5:07.08	Did not advance		5

== Fencing ==
15 fencers, all men, represented Poland in 1964.

=== Men ===
Athlete	Event	Round 1		Round 2		Round 3	Round 4	Quarterfinal	Semifinal	Final	
Athlete	Event	Opposition Result	Rank	Opposition Result	Rank	Opposition Result	Opposition Result	Opposition Result	Opposition Result	Opposition Result	Rank
Wiesław Glos	Men's épée		3 Q		4 Q			Did not advance			
Bogdan Gonsior	Men's épée		3 Q		3 Q			Did not advance			
Henryk Nielaba	Men's épée		2 Q		1 Q			Did not advance			
Henryk Nielaba; Mikołaj Pomarnacki; Bogdan Gonsior; Bohdan Andrzejewski; Jerzy Pawłowski	Team épée	United States; W 14-2; France	1 Q	—N/a			BYE	Italy; L 6-9	Switzerland; W 9-5	United Team of Germany; W 8-8	5
Egon Franke	Men's foil		2 Q		2 Q						Gold medal
Ryszard Parulski	Men's foil		1 Q		4 Q		2 Q			Did not advance	
Witold Woyda	Men's foil		1 Q		1 Q		3 Q		2 Q		
Witold Woyda; Zbigniew Skrudlik; Ryszard Parulski; Egon Franke; Janusz Różycki	Team foil	Great Britain; W 9-5; Australia; W 13-3; Italy	1 Q	—N/a				Romania; W 9-2	Japan; W 9-4	Soviet Union; L 7-9	Silver medal
Emil Ochyra	Men's sabre		1 Q		2 Q		2 Q		1 Q		
Jerzy Pawłowski	Men's sabre		1 Q		1 Q		1 Q		4 Q		
Andrzej Piątkowski	Men's sabre		2 Q		1 Q	Rylsky (URS) W 5-4; Ferrari (ITA) L 2-5; Horváth (HUN) L 1-5; Van Der Auwera (BEL) L 4-5; Morales (USA) W 5-3		Did not advance			
Emil Ochyra; Jerzy Pawłowski; Ryszard Zub; Andrzej Piątkowski; Wojciech Zabłocki	Team sabre	Iran; W 16-0; United Team of Germany	1 Q	—N/a				United Team of Germany; W 9-6	Soviet Union; L 7-9	France; W 8-8	Bronze medal

== Gymnastics ==
=== Artistic ===
Men

Athlete	Event	Final Standings								Apparatus Final							
Athlete	Event	Apparatus						Total	Rank	Apparatus						Total	Rank
Athlete	Event	F	PH	R	V	PB	HB	Total	Rank	F	PH	R	V	PB	HB	Total	Rank
Jan Jankowicz	All-around	18.60	17.55	18.30	18.60	18.80	18.75	110.60	45	Did not advance							
Andrzej Konopka	All-around	18.35	17.20	18.20	18.45	18.30	18.20	108.70	75	Did not advance							
Mikołaj Kubica	All-around	18.80	18.70	18.80	19.10	18.70	19.10	113.20	16	Did not advance							
Wilhelm Kubica	All-around	18.55	18.40	18.35	18.75	18.00	19.05	111.10	35	Did not advance							
Alfred Kucharczyk	All-around	18.85	18.20	18.50	19.30	17.60	18.60	111.05	37	Did not advance							
Aleksander Rokosa	All-around	18.85	18.10	18.60	18.85	18.80	18.75	111.95	25	Did not advance							
Jan Jankowicz; Andrzej Konopka; Mikołaj Kubica; Wilhelm Kubica; Alfred Kucharczyk; Aleksander Rokosa	Team all-around	93.65	94.60	93.35	94.25	92.55	91.10	559.50	5	—N/a							

Women

Athlete	Event	Final Standings						Apparatus Final					
Athlete	Event	Apparatus				Total	Rank	Apparatus				Total	Rank
Athlete	Event	F	V	UB	BB	Total	Rank	F	V	UB	BB	Total	Rank
Elżbieta Apostolska	All-around	18.533	18.533	18.133	18.632	73.831	37	Did not advance					
Gerda Bryłka	All-around	18.799	18.799	18.233	18.732	74.563	28	Did not advance					
Barbara Eustachiewicz	All-around	18.599	18.533	18.633	18.432	74.197	33	Did not advance					
Dorota Miler	All-around	18.199	18.700	18.100	18.466	73.465	43	Did not advance					
Gizela Niedurny	All-around	18.500	18.066	18.133	17.666	72.365	56	Did not advance					
Małgorzata Wilczek	All-around	18.699	18.866	18.299	18.699	74.563	28	Did not advance					
Elżbieta Apostolska; Gerda Bryłka; Barbara Eustachiewicz; Dorota Miler; Gizela Niedurny; Małgorzata Wilczek	Team all-around	93.431	91.531	93.195	93.130	371.287	7	—N/a					

== Rowing ==
Men

Athlete	Event	Heats		Repechage		Final	
Athlete	Event	Time	Rank	Time	Rank	Time	Rank
Eugeniusz Kubiak	Single sculls	8:08.96	3 R	7:44.75	3 FB	DNS	13
Czesław Nawrot; Alfons Ślusarski	Coxless pair	7:47.02	4 R	7:35.82	2 FB	7:08.38	8
Kazimierz Naskręcki; Marian Siejkowski; Stanisław Kozera	Coxed pair	7:55.79	1 Q	BYE		8:40.00	6
Szczepan Grajczyk; Marian Leszczyński; Ryszard Lubicki; Andrzej Nowaczyk; Jerzy Pawłowski	Coxless four	6:58.64	3 R	7:11.74	1 Q	7:28.15	6

== Shooting ==
Six shooters represented Poland in 1964.

Men

Athlete	Event	Final	
Athlete	Event	Score	Rank
Henryk Górski	Men's 300 metre rifle three positions	1110	15
Henryk Górski	Men's 50 metre rifle three positions	1132	18
Kazimierz Kurzawski	50 m pistol	537	25
Jerzy Nowicki	Men's 50 metre rifle three positions	1147	5
Stanisław Marucha	Men's 50 metre rifle prone	591	16
Adam Smelczyński	Trap	183	32
Józef Zapędzki	25 m rapid fire pistol	584	15

== Volleyball ==
Women's team competition

=== Round robin ===
Date		Score		Set 1	Set 2	Set 3	Set 4	Set 5	Total
12 Oct	Poland	3–0	United States	15–3	15–4	15–10			45–17
13 Oct	Poland	3–0	South Korea	15–5	15–5	15–11			45–21
15 Oct	Soviet Union	3–0	Poland	15–9	15–5	15–5			45–19
18 Oct	Japan	3–1	Poland	15–4	15–5	13–15	15-2		58–26
22 Oct	Poland	3–0	Romania	15–7	15–6	15–8			45–21

=== Final standings ===
Place	Team	Pts	W	L	SF	SA	PF	PA
	Japan	10	5	0	15	1	238	93
	Soviet Union	8	4	1	12	3	212	97
	Poland	6	3	2	10	6	180	162
4	Romania	4	2	3	6	9	140	172
5	United States	2	1	4	3	12	98	213
6	South Korea	0	0	5	0	15	94	225

- Team roster

Poland

- Krystyna Czajkowska
- Maria Golimowska
- Krystyna Jakubowska
- Danuta Kordaczuk
- Krystyna Krupowa
- Josefa Ledwignowa
- Jadwiga Marko
- Jadwiga Rutkowska
- Maria Sliwkowa
- Zofia Szczesniewska
- Hanna Krystyna Busz
- Barbara Hermela

Head coach

== Weightlifting ==
Men

Athlete	Event	Military Press		Snatch		Clean & Jerk		Total	Rank
Athlete	Event	Result	Rank	Result	Rank	Result	Rank	Total	Rank
Henryk Trębicki	56 kg	105	4	102.5	5	135	5	342.5	4
Mieczysław Nowak	60 kg	112.5	6	115	2	150	3	377.5	Bronze medal
Rudolf Kozłowski	60 kg	110	8	107.5	6	140	5	357.5	7
Waldemar Baszanowski	67.5 kg	132.5	3	135 WR	1	165 OR	1	432.5 WR	Gold medal
Marian Zieliński	67.5 kg	140 WR	1	120	4	160	3	420	Bronze medal
Jerzy Kaczkowski	82.5 kg	145	6	135	4	177.5	3	457.5	4
Ireneusz Paliński	90 kg	150	4	135	5	182.5 OR	1	467.5	Bronze medal

== Wrestling ==
Men's Greco-Roman

Athlete	Event	Elimination Pool						Final round	
Athlete	Event	Round 1 Result	Round 2 Result	Round 3 Result	Round 4 Result	Round 5 Result	Round 6 Result	Final round Result	Rank
Bernard Knitter	−57 kg	Siavash Shafizadeh (IRN); W P	Ion Cernea (ROU); L P	Vladlen Trostyansky (URS); L P	Did not advance				11
Kazimierz Macioch	−63 kg	Roman Rurua (URS); L P	Bandu Patil (IND); W WO	Joseph Mewis (BEL); W P	Koji Sakurama (JPN); L P	Did not advance			9
Bolesław Dubicki	−78 kg	Russell Camilleri (USA); W P	Albert Michiels (BEL); W P	Helmut Langle (AUT); W P	Antal Rizmayer (HUN); L E	Kiril Petkov (BUL); L E	Anatoly Kolesov (URS); L P	Bertil Nystrom (SWE); L E	4
Czesław Kwieciński	−87 kg	Lothar Metz (EUA); L P	Valentin Olenik (URS); L P	Did not advance					15
Lucjan Sosnowski	-97 kg	Nicolae Martinescu (ROU); W E	Petar Cucic (YUG); L E	Adelmo Bulgarelli (ITA); L P	Did not advance				12
