= Norway at the 1964 Summer Olympics =

- IOC code: NOR
- NOC: Norwegian Sports Federation

in Tokyo, Japan 10–24 October
- Competitors: 26 (24 men, 2 women) in 6 sports
- Flag bearer: Prince Harald of Norway (sailing)
- Medals: Gold 0 Silver 0 Bronze 0 Total 0

Summer Olympics appearances (overview)
- 1900; ~~1904~~; 1908; 1912; 1920; 1924; 1928; 1932; 1936; 1948; 1952; 1956; 1960; 1964; 1968; 1972; 1976; 1980; 1984; 1988; 1992; 1996; 2000; 2004; 2008; 2012; 2016; 2020; 2024; 2028

Other related appearances
- 1906 Intercalated Games

Norway competed at the 1964 Summer Olympics in Tokyo, Japan. 26 competitors, 24 men and 2 women, took part in 23 events in 6 sports. It was only the second time that Norwegian athletes failed to win any medals at the Olympic Games.

== Athletics ==
Men's 5000 metres

- Thor Helland

- Heat – 13:52.4 min (→ advanced to the final)
- Final – 13:57.0 min (→ 8th place)

Men's 10,000 metres

- Pål Benum – 30:00.8 min (→ 19th place)

Women's long jump

- Berit Berthelsen

- Qualification – 6.32 m (→ advanced to the final)
- Final – 6.19 m (→ 9th place)

- Oddrun Hokland

- Qualification – 6.03 m (→ advanced to the final)
- Final – 5.68 m (→ 16th place)

Men's javelin throw

- Terje Pedersen

- Qualification – 72.10 metres (→ did not advance)

- Willy Rasmussen

- Qualification – 68.43 metres (→ did not advance)

Women's pentathlon

- Oddrun Hokland – 4429 pts (→ 16th place)

== Rowing ==
Coxed Four

- Tor Ahlsand
- Birger Knudtzon
- Ingolf Kristiansen

== Shooting ==
Three shooters represented Norway in 1964.

25 m pistol

- Nicolaus Zwetnow

300 m rifle, three positions

- Magne Landrø
- Thormod Næs

50 m rifle, three positions

- Magne Landrø

50 m rifle, prone

- Thormod Næs
- Magne Landrø
