= Bobbie van de Graaf =

Dutch rower

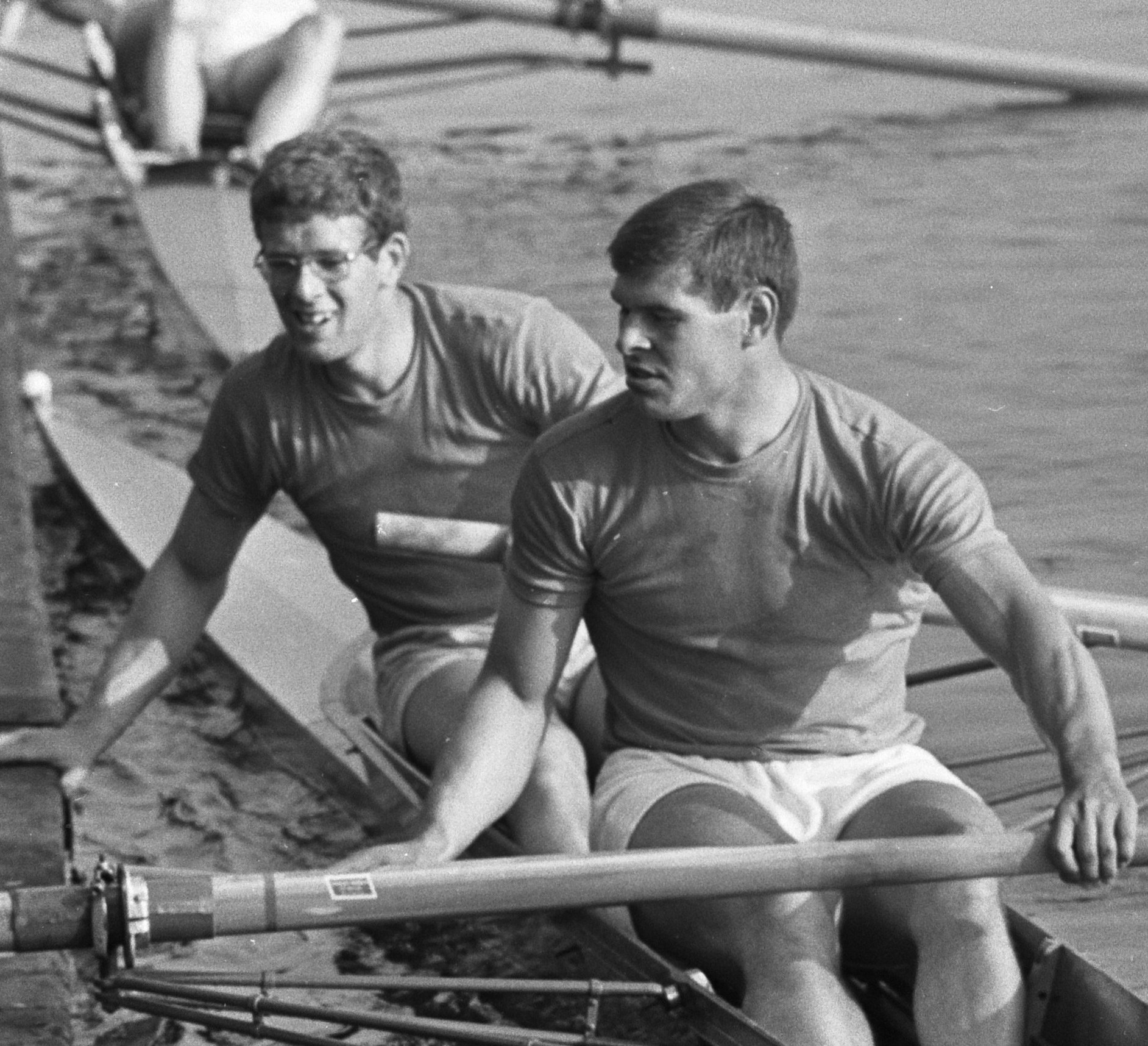
- Bobbie van de Graaf (left) and Freek van de Graaff in 1967

Personal information
- Full name: Robert van de Graaf
- Born: 17 March 1944 (age 82) Macclesfield, Great Britain
- Height: 1.89 m (6 ft 2 in)
- Weight: 82 kg (181 lb)

Sport
- Sport: Rowing
- Club: Laga, Delft
Medal record
Representing the Netherlands
Olympic Games
Bronze medal – third place	1964 Tokyo	Coxed four

Robert "Bobbie" van de Graaf (born 17 March 1944) is a retired Dutch rower who won a bronze medal in the coxed fours at the 1964 Summer Olympics. His team mates were Marius Klumperbeek (cox), Lex Mullink, Freek van de Graaff and Jan van de Graaff. The latter two were also born in 1944 and are unrelated to Bobbie.
