= Jan van de Graaff =

Dutch rower

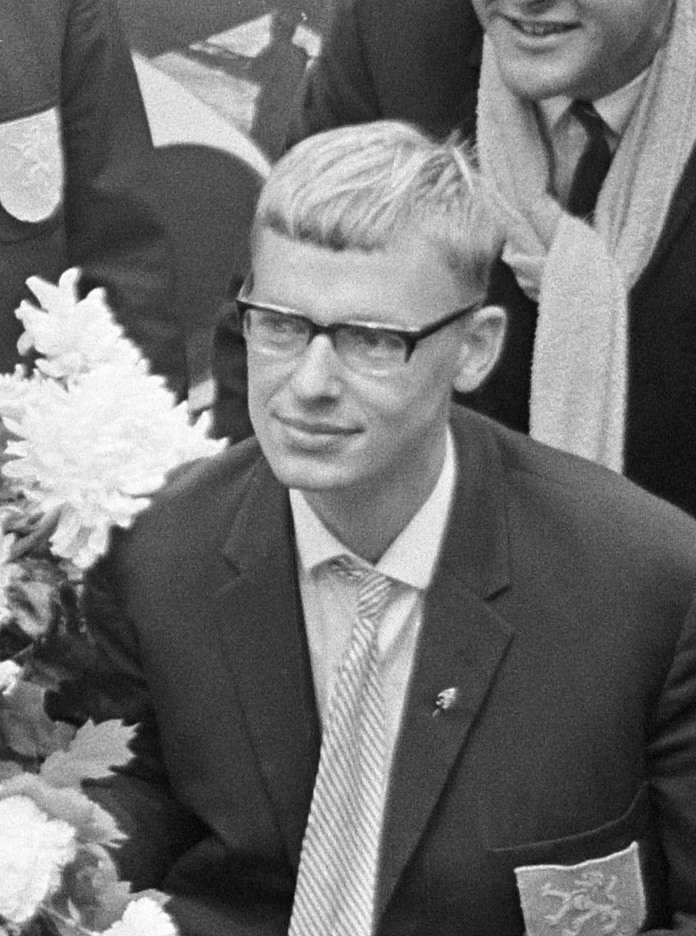
- Jan van de Graaff in 1966

Personal information
- Born: 24 September 1944 (age 81) Hengelo, Netherlands
- Height: 1.93 m (6 ft 4 in)
- Weight: 92 kg (203 lb)

Sport
- Sport: Rowing
- Club: Laga, Delft
Medal record
Representing the Netherlands
Olympic Games
Bronze medal – third place	1964 Tokyo	Coxed four
World Rowing Championships
Gold medal – first place	1966 Bled	Coxed pair

Jan van de Graaff (born 24 September 1944) is a retired Dutch rower. He won the world title in the coxed pair at the 1966 World Rowing Championships and a bronze medal in the coxed fours at the 1964 Summer Olympics. At the 1964 Olympics his teammates were Marius Klumperbeek (cox), Lex Mullink, Bobbie van de Graaf and Freek van de Graaff. The three "van de Graaf(f)s" were all born in 1944.
