= Freek van de Graaff =

Dutch rower

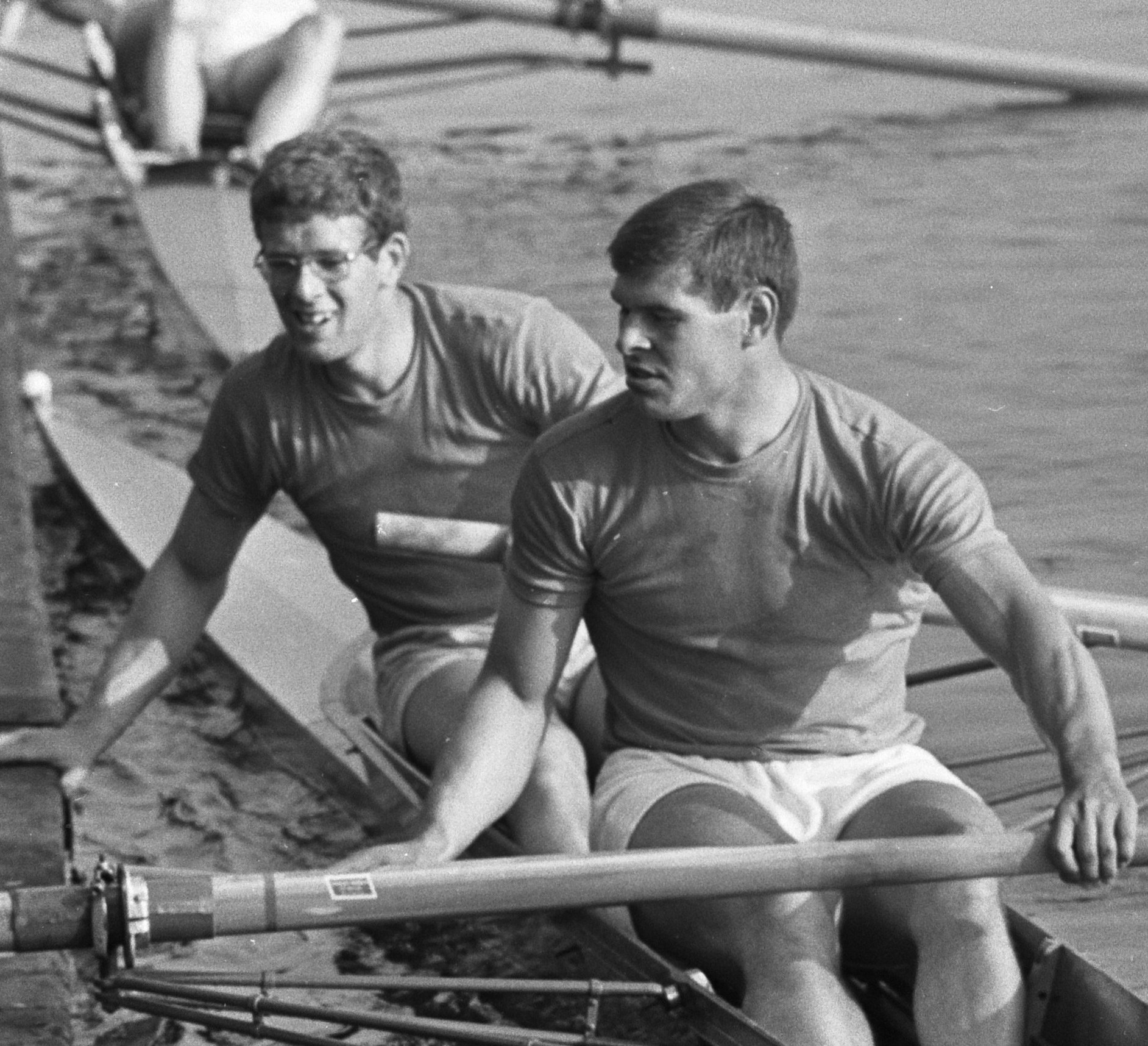
- Bobbie van de Graaf (left) and Freek van de Graaff in 1967

Personal information
- Born: 20 February 1944 Oegstgeest, Netherlands
- Died: 24 June 2009 (aged 65) The Hague, Netherlands
- Height: 1.87 m (6 ft 2 in)
- Weight: 92 kg (203 lb)

Sport
- Sport: Rowing
- Club: Laga, Delft
Medal record
Representing the Netherlands
Olympic Games
Bronze medal – third place	1964 Tokyo	Coxed four

Frederik Robbert "Freek" van de Graaff (20 February 1944 – 24 June 2009) was a Dutch rower who won a bronze medal in the coxed fours at the 1964 Summer Olympics. His team mates were Marius Klumperbeek (cox), Lex Mullink, Bobbie van de Graaf and Jan van de Graaff. The three "van de Graaf(f)s" were all born in 1944.
