= Masakatsu =

- Gender: Male

Origin
- Origin: Japanese
- Meaning: Different meanings depending on the kanji used

Masakatsu (written: 正勝, 正克, 傑將, 優治, 征勝, 将勝, 昌克, 昌勝, 必勝 or 政勝) is a masculine Japanese given name. Notable people with the name include:

- Abe Masakatsu (阿部 正勝; 1541–1600), Japanese samurai
- Masakatsu Aoki (青木 昌勝; born 1957), Japanese astronomer
- Masakatsu Asari (浅利 正勝; born 1945), Japanese ski jumper
- Masakatsu Funaki (船木 優治; born 1969), Japanese mixed martial artist and professional wrestler
- Masakatsu G. Fujie (藤江 正克; born 1945), Japanese academic
- Hachisuka Masakatsu (蜂須賀 正勝; 1526–1586), Japanese daimyō
- Masakatsu Hikosaka (彦坂 匡克; born 1991), Japanese rugby sevens player
- Inaba Masakatsu (稲葉 正勝; 1597–1634), Japanese daimyō
- Ishiura Masakatsu (石浦 将勝; born 1991), Japanese sumo wrestler
- Masakatsu Iwamoto, Japanese artist
- Masakatsu Koike (小池 正勝; born 1952), Japanese politician
- Kotozakura Masakatsu (琴櫻 傑將; 1940–2007), Japanese sumo wrestler
- Masakatsu Miyamoto (宮本 征勝; 1938–2002), Japanese footballer and manager
- Masakatsu Morita (森田 必勝; 1945–1970), Japanese activist
- Masakatsu Sawa (澤 昌克; born 1983), Japanese footballer
- Masakatsu Shibasaki (柴崎 正勝; born 1947), Japanese chemist
- Takagi Masakatsu (高木 正勝; born 1979), Japanese musician
- Masakatsu Ueda (上田 将勝; born 1977), Japanese mixed martial artist
- Uemura Masakatsu (植村 正勝; 1535–1592), Japanese samurai
- Masakatsu Yamanouchi (山内 政勝; born 1942), Japanese rower
- Yūki Masakatsu (結城 政勝; 1503–1559), Japanese samurai

== See also ==
- 8503 Masakatsu, a main-belt asteroid
