= Ismo =

Ismo is a given name. Notable people and characters with the name include:

- Ismo Alanko (born 1960), Finnish musician
- Ismo Falck (born 1966), Finnish archer
- Ismo Hölttö (born 1940), Finnish photographer
- Ismo Junni (1943–1995), Finnish serial killer and arsonist
- Ismo Kamesaki (born 1970), Finnish wrestler
- Ismo Kanerva (born 1942), Finnish rower
- Ismo Laitela, fictional character in the Finnish soap opera Salatut elämät
- Ismo Lehkonen (born 1962), Finnish ice hockey player
- Ismo Leikola (born 1979), Finnish comedian
- Ismo Lius (born 1965), Finnish footballer
- Ismo Lindell (born 1939), Finnish electrical engineer and academician
- Ismo Sajakorpi (born 1944), Finnish director and screenwriter
- Ismo Toukonen (born 1954), Finnish steeplechase runner
- Ismo Villa (1954–2014), Finnish ice hockey player
- Ismo Vorstermans (born 1989), Dutch footballer

== See also ==
- Ismo-20, a brand name for isosorbide mononitrate
