= Mashour =

Mashour is an Arabic origin word. It has some variants, including Mashhour. It is used as a masculine given name and a surname. People with the name include:

== Given name ==
- Mashour Haditha al-Jazy (1928–2001), Jordanian army general
- Mashhour Ahmed Mashhour (1918–2008), Egyptian engineer
- Mashour bin Abdulaziz Al Saud (born 1942), Saudi royal and businessman
- Mashour bin Saud Al Saud (1954–2004), Saudi royal

== Surname ==
- Bassel Mashhour (born 1982), Egyptian water polo player
- George Mashour, American anesthesiologist
- Karam Mashour (born 1991), Arab-Israeli basketball player
- Salem Mashour (born 1940), Egyptian rower
