= Abdullah Ali =

Abdullah Ali may refer to:

- Abdullah Ali (footballer)
- Abdullah Ali (rower)
- Abdullah Ali (sport shooter)
- Abdalla Ali, Tanzanian politician
