= Joachim Werner =

Joachim Werner may refer to:

- Joachim Werner (archaeologist) (1909–1994), German archaeologist and scholar
- Joachim Werner (rower) (born 1939), German Olympic rower
