= Human trophy collecting =

Collecting of human body parts

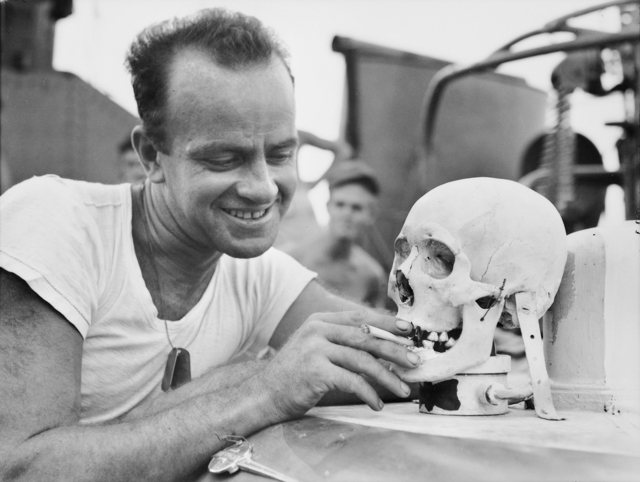
American sailor with the skull of a Japanese soldier during World War II

The practice of human trophy collecting involves the acquisition of human body parts as trophy, usually as war trophy. The intent may be to demonstrate dominance over the deceased (such as scalping or forming necklaces of severed ears or teeth), to humiliate or intimidate the enemy (such as shrunken heads or skull cups), or in some rare cases to commemorate the deceased (such as the veneration of the relics of saints). It can be done to prove one's body count in battle, to boast of one's prowess and achievements to peers, or as a status symbol of superior masculinity. Serial killers' collection of their victims' body parts have also been described as a form of trophy-taking.

While older customs generally included the burial of human war trophies along with the collector, such items have been sold in modern times.

== History ==
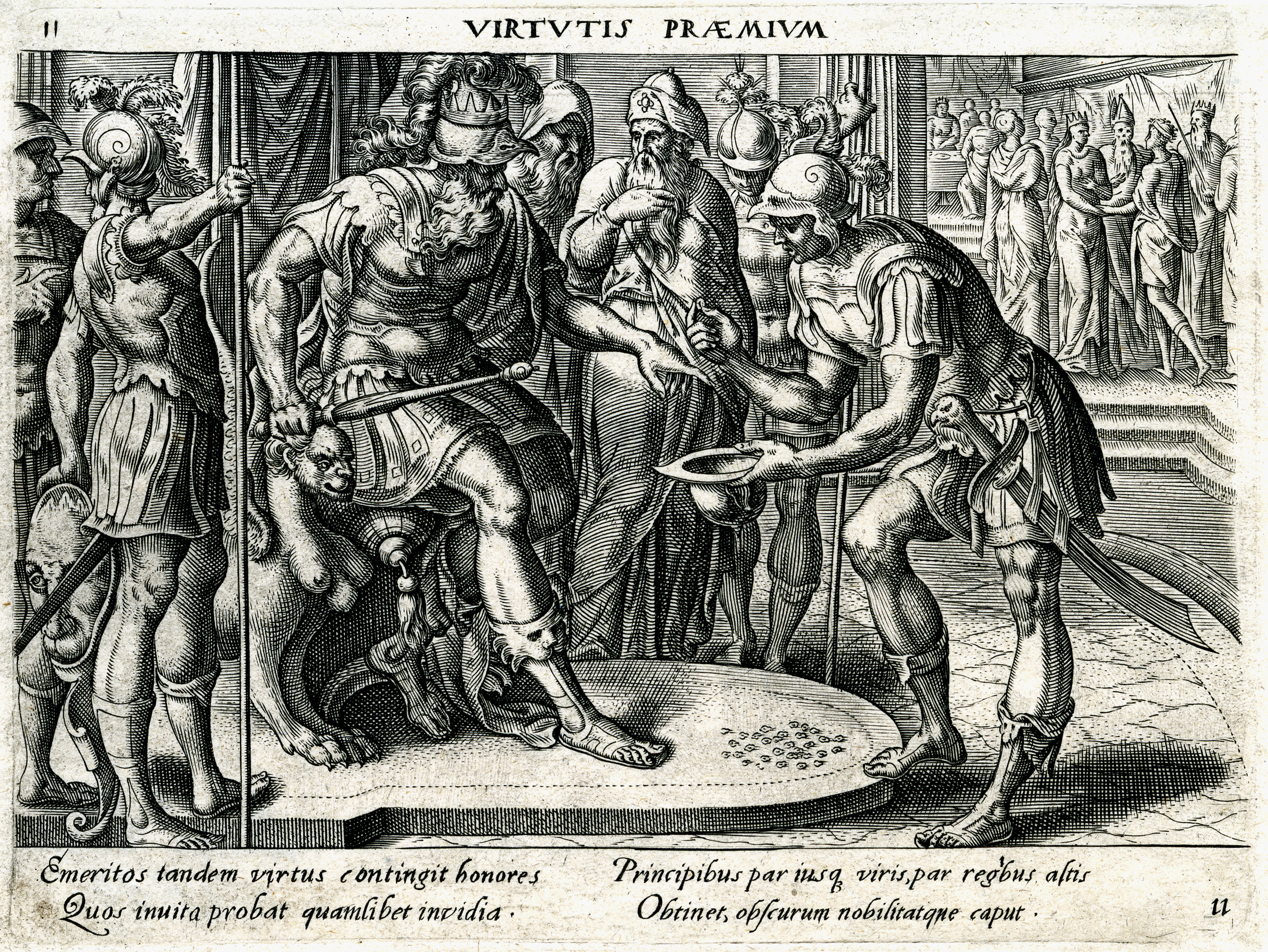
David bringing two hundred foreskins of the Philistines to King Saul

Archaeologists discovered human skull cups dating to 14,700 years ago in Gough's Cave, in Somerset, England; these skulls were modified in ways indicative of intentional human trophy collecting, including removal of the facial region and cleaning them.

According to biblical scripture, in the Old Testament, Saul asked David to bring him one hundred Philistine foreskins as bride price for his daughter Michal. David and his men fought a battle, and he presented the king with two hundred.

Headhunting has been practiced across the Americas, Europe, Asia, and Oceania for millennia. One analysis of the practice in early North American societies linked it to social distance from the victim. Groups such as the Scythians collected the skulls of the vanquished to make a skull cup.

Among Natives of North America Scalping has been practiced by many societies as a lighter and easily incorporated form of trophy taking. While once thought to have been introduced by European colonists, it is now known that Scalping has been practiced among Native Americans centuries before contact. Of the nearly 500 bodies found at the Crow Creek massacre site from 14th century South Dakota, 90% show signs of Scalping. It was common to Scalp noncombatants as it was a sign that the warrior who had taken them entered deep into enemy territory. Scalps were often worked into objects and clothing and used in various ceremonies.

In South America Jivaroan groups such as the Shuar would shrink the heads of slain enemies to keep their souls trapped. The Mapuche would create various objects out of the bones of their enemies, they were fond of making flutes out of shin bones, typically the captive was still alive when the shin bone was removed and they were forced to play said flute until death.

In the Japanese invasions of Korea (1592–1598), the noses of slain Koreans and Chinese were collected and brought back to Japan, where they were placed in the Mimizuka monument in Kyoto. As of 2024, it still stands.

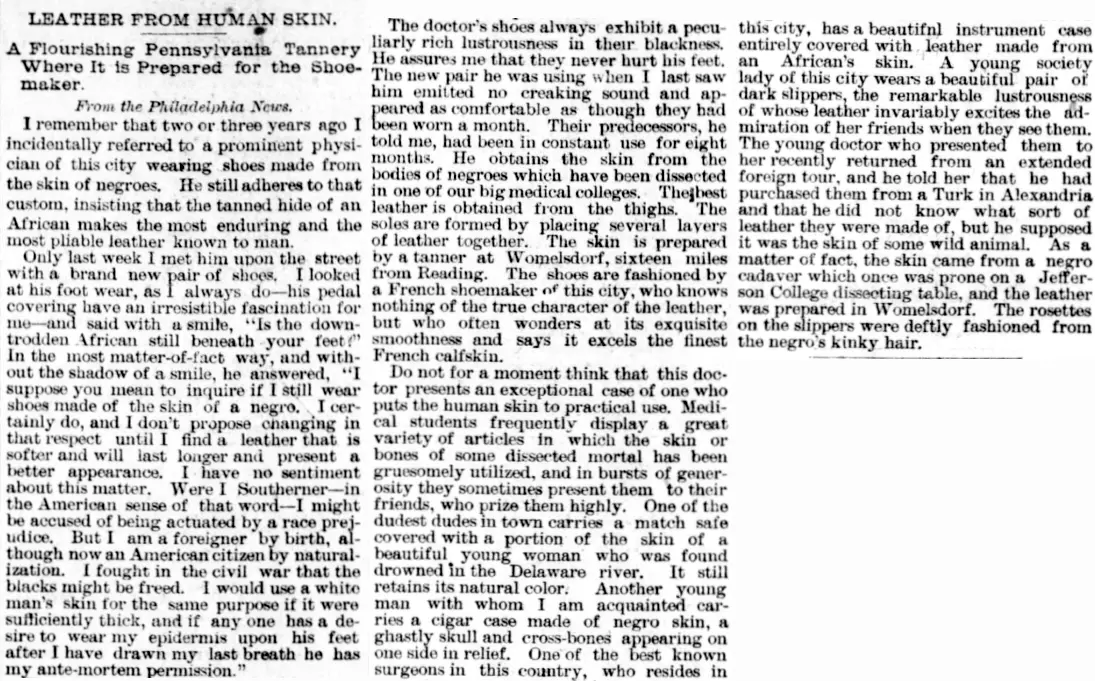
An 1887 article about white people wearing shoes made of Black people's skin

In North America, it was common practice before, during or after the lynching of African Americans for the European Americans involved to take souvenirs such as body parts, skin, bones, genitalia, etc.

In the United States, trophies were also acquired during conquest of indigenous lands by settlers and other Native American groups. The scalp, skull, and wrist-bones of Little Crow, the Mdewakanton leader during the Minnesota hostilities of 1862, were obtained and displayed for decades at the Minnesota Historical Society as war trophies from Minnesota's bounty on the Santee Sioux. The MHS is established in the Constitution of the Minnesota Territory. In another instance connected to battlefield success and to the American mutilation of Japanese war dead, President of the United States Franklin Roosevelt was given a gift of a letter-opener made of a Japanese soldier's arm by U.S. Representative Francis E. Walter in 1944. After a call by the Roman Catholic Archdiocese of Tokyo for "respect for the laws of humanity even in total war" Roosevelt ordered the item to be returned to its sender and recommended it be properly buried.

Remains of killed criminals were often used as trophies. Western outlaw Big Nose George had his skull turned into an ashtray and skin tanned into shoes after his death, the doctor who did such later wore the shoes to his inauguration as Governor of Wyoming. William Corder of the Red Barn Murder had his skin bound to a book about the woman he killed. William Burke of the Burke and Hare murders similarly had his skin bound into a book, his blood was also used as ink. Following his death in 1911, the outlaw Elmer McCurdy had his entire corpse used as a travelling sideshow attraction.

In addition to human body parts appearing in museums and artifact collections in the explicit context of historical conquest, they are also included for both putative and actual scientific reasons, particularly scientific racism establishing justification for dominance over subject races. The body of William Lanne, the last "full-blooded" Tasmanian Aboriginal man, was mutilated after his death in 1869 by William Crowther who later became the Premier of Tasmania, and Lanne's skull was sent to the Royal College of Surgeons in London to supposedly demonstrate "the improvement that takes place in the lower race when subjected to the effects of education and civilisation". Crowther's mutilation of Lanne proved immensely controversial in Tasmania.

During the German Empire's Herero and Namaqua genocide in German South West Africa at the beginning of the twentieth century, specimens of African body parts were obtained and taken to German museums and academic institutions, in some instances in the aftermath of medical experimentation on human subjects. In 2011, when some of these items were returned to present-day Namibia, the rector of the University of Freiburg referred to the period of their acquisition as "one of the dark chapters in the history of European science". Later in the century the Jewish skull collection and other medical resources were the result of Nazi Germany's human experimentation programs and other elements of the Holocaust.

The practice occurred during World War II and the Vietnam War. About 60% of the bodies of Japanese soldiers recovered in the Mariana Islands and returned to Japan lacked skulls. The practice continued up until the 20th century in the Balkans.

== Other examples ==
- Human trophy taking in Mesoamerica
- Mokomokai: the much-traded and much-collected preserved tattooed heads of New Zealand Māori.
- The Aghori Hindu sect in India collects human remains which have been consecrated to the Ganges river, making skull cups, or using the corpses as meditation tools.
- Tibetan Buddhists employ the kangling, a trumpet made from a human thighbone
- The scrotum of the last male Aboriginal Tasmanian, William Lanne, was crafted into a tobacco pouch after his death.
- During the Japanese invasions of Korea (1592–98) Japanese samurai took the noses of dead Koreans as trophies and as proofs of kills; these were pickled and sent back to Japan and buried in nose tombs.
- Body snatchings are sometimes conducted to retain a body part as a trophy.

== Trade ==
Trophy skulls with purported colonial-era ethnic engravings were widely sold online at various platforms. In 2005, Royal Malaysian Customs Department seized 16 human skulls with engravings that were purported to originate from northwest of West Kalimantan province, somewhere between Pontianak and the Sarawak border, and bound for an unknown buyer in Australia. These seized skulls were transferred to Sarawak State Museum in 2015.

In present-day Europe merchants and collectors buy and sell human body parts and objects incorporating them at some antique shops, junk shops, and braderies or street markets. For items without an identifiable origin, and in some cases even when an origin is identifiable, this generally is not legally prohibited.

== See also ==
- Ismo Junni, Finnish serial killer who stole victims’ teeth
- Maywand District murders – 2010 murders of Afghan civilians by U.S. Army soldiers
