= Rolf Syversen =

Rolf Syversen may refer to:

- Rolf Syversen (rower)
- Rolf Syversen (musician)
