= Luzgin =

Luzgin (Russian: Лузгин) is a Russian masculine surname originating from the nickname Luzga or Luska, meaning one eyed man; its feminine counterpart is Luzgina.

It may refer to:

- Anatoly Luzgin (born 1931), Russian rowing coxswain
- Andrei Luzgin (born 1973), Estonian tennis player and coach
