= OUE =

OUE or Oue may refer to:

- Ounge language, the ISO 639-3 code oue
- Ohio University Eastern Campus, a satellite campus of Ohio University
- Osaka University of Economics, a private university located in Higashiyodogawa-ku, Osaka, Japan
- OUE Downtown, a high-rise skyscraper complex acquired by Overseas Union Enterprise

== People ==
- Eiji Oue, a Japanese conductor
- Oue Hideo, a Japanese rower
