= Jankowicz =

Jankowicz is a Polish surname. Notable people with the surname include:

- Jan Jankowicz (1932–2019), Polish gymnast
- Nina Jankowicz (born 1988/1989), American researcher, author, and commentator specializing in disinformation
