= Michel Dumas =

Michel Dumas may refer to:

- Michel Dumas (ice hockey) (born 1949), Canadian ice hockey player
- Michel Dumas (painter) (1812–1885), French painter
- Michel Dumas (rower) (born 1944), French rower
