= Thomas Pollock =

Thomas Pollock may refer to:

- Thomas Pollock (ice hockey), Canadian ice hockey player
- Thomas Pollock (governor), Scottish planter, lawyer and acting governor of North Carolina
- Tom Pollock (Thomas Philip Pollock), American film producer and studio executive
- Thomas Duncan Pollock, Northern Irish unionist politician

== See also ==
- Tom Pollock (rower), American rower
- Thomas Pollock Anshutz, American painter and teacher
