= Gérard Jacquesson =

French rower (1941–2024)

Personal information
- Nationality: French
- Born: 30 August 1941; Khouribga, French Morocco
- Died: 18 April 2024 (aged 82); Nice, France

Sport
- Sport: Rowing

Gérard Jacquesson (30 August 1941 – 18 April 2024) was a French rower. He competed in the men's coxed four event at the 1964 Summer Olympics. Jacquesson died on 18 April 2024, at the age of 82.
