= Ted Washburn (rowing) =

American rower

Personal information
- Nationality: American
- Born: September 25, 1942 Boston, Massachusetts, United States
- Died: April 6, 2018 (aged 75) Lexington, Massachusetts, United States

Sport
- Sport: Rowing

Ted Washburn (September 25, 1942 – April 6, 2018) was an American rower. He competed in the men's coxed four event at the 1964 Summer Olympics. He graduated from Harvard University.
