= Tom Hinsby =

Danish rower

Personal information
- Nationality: Danish
- Born: 22 July 1945 Frederiksberg, Denmark
- Died: 16 March 2025 (aged 79) Northampton, England

Sport
- Sport: Rowing

Tom Hinsby (22 July 1945 – 16 March 2025) was a Danish rower. He competed in the men's coxed four event at the 1964 Summer Olympics.
