= Peter Neusel =

German rower (1941–2021)

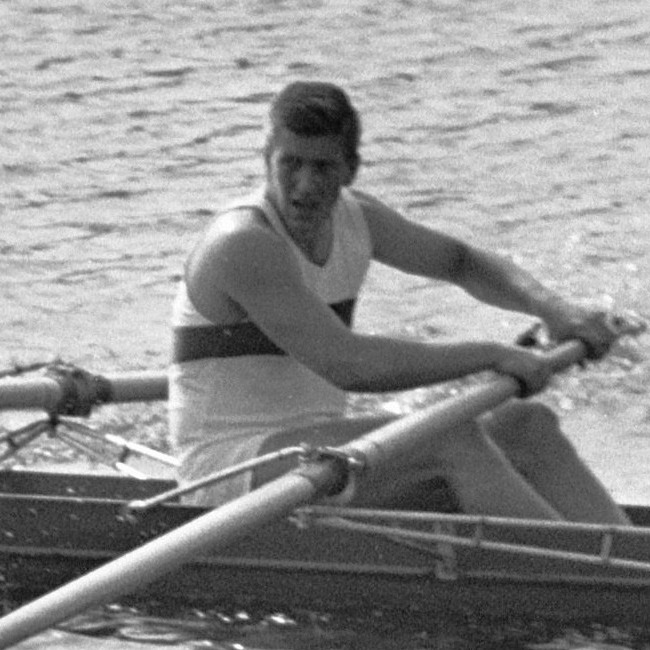
- Neusel in 1964

Personal information
- Born: 19 November 1941 Berlin, Germany
- Died: 22 July 2021 (aged 79)
- Height: 1.93 m (6 ft 4 in)
- Weight: 94 kg (207 lb)

Sport
- Sport: Rowing
- Club: BRC, Berlin
Medal record
Men's rowing
Representing Germany
Olympic Games
Gold medal – first place	1964 Tokyo	Coxed four
Representing West Germany
World Rowing Championships
Gold medal – first place	1962 Lucerne	Coxed four
European Rowing Championships
Gold medal – first place	1963 Copenhagen	Coxed four
Silver medal – second place	1961 Prague	Eight
Silver medal – second place	1964 Amsterdam	Coxed four

Peter Neusel (19 November 1941 – 22 July 2021) was a German rower who had his best achievements in the coxed fours. In this event he won a world title in 1962, a European title in 1963 and a gold medal at the 1964 Summer Olympics. He died on 22 July 2021, at the age of 79.
