= Franco De Pedrina =

Italian rower

Personal information
- Born: 27 January 1941 (age 85) Cino, Italy
- Height: 1.84 m (6 ft 0 in)
- Weight: 83 kg (183 lb)

Sport
- Sport: Rowing
- Club: Canottieri Falck, Dongo
Medal record
Representing Italy
Olympic Games
Silver medal – second place	1964 Tokyo	Coxed four
European Rowing Championships
Bronze medal – third place	1964 Amsterdam	Coxed four

Franco De Pedrina (born 27 January 1941) is a retired Italian rower who had his best achievements in the coxed fours. In this event he won a silver medal at the 1964 Summer Olympics and a bronze at the 1964 European Championships.
