= Emilio Trivini =

Italian rower (1938–2022)

Personal information
- Born: 5 April 1938 Dongo, Lombardy, Italy
- Died: 27 August 2022 (aged 84) Rome, Italy
- Height: 1.83 m (6 ft 0 in)
- Weight: 84 kg (185 lb)

Sport
- Sport: Rowing
- Club: Canottieri Falck, Dongo
Medal record
Representing Italy
Olympic Games
Silver medal – second place	1964 Tokyo	Coxed four
European Rowing Championships
Bronze medal – third place	1964 Amsterdam	Coxed four

Emilio Trivini (5 April 1938 – 27 August 2022) was an Italian rower who had his best achievements in the coxed fours. In this event he won a silver medal at the 1964 Summer Olympics and a bronze at the 1964 European Rowing Championships. His team finished fourth at the 1968 Summer Olympics.

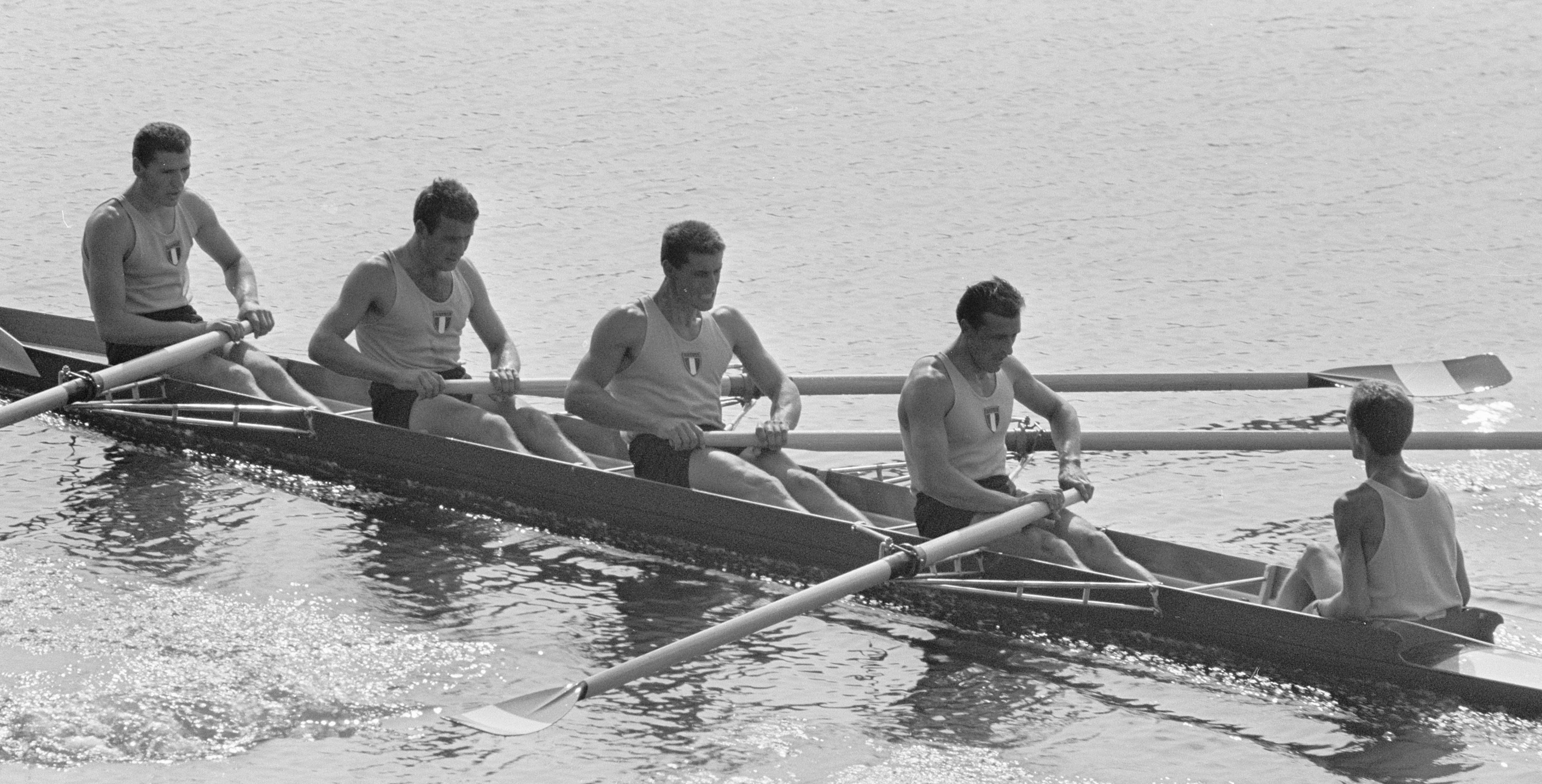
Italian coxed four at the 1964 European Championships, Trivini is in the centre
