= Gary Herford =

Australian rower

Personal information
- Nationality: Australian
- Born: 10 August 1940; Manly, New South Wales, Australia
- Died: 17 November 1997 (aged 57); Mosman, New South Wales, Australia

Sport
- Sport: Rowing

Gary Herford (10 August 1940 – 17 November 1997) was an Australian rower. He competed in the men's coxed four event at the 1964 Summer Olympics.

== Club and state rowing ==
Herford's senior rowing was initially from the Mosman Rowing Club and later the Sydney Rowing Club.

Herford made three state representative appearances in the New South Wales senior eight which contested the King's Cup. He rowed in the two seat at the 1962 Interstate Championships held on Lake Wendouree, at four in Brisbane in 1963 to a second placing and then he stroked the 1964 NSW men's eight to another second place at the 1964 Interstate Regatta in Sydney.

At the 1964 Australian Rowing Championships Herford contested both the coxless and coxed four championship in Sydney colours and won the coxed four title and with it, selection for the Tokyo Olympics.

== International representative rowing ==
In 1961 a three race Trans-Tasman test series was held against New Zealand to help both counties crews gain international experience. An all Mosman Rowing Club won the selection trials held by the New South Wales Rowing Association for the right to represent. Herford was in the four seat of the Australian eight who were beaten in all three match races in New Zealand.

At the 1964 Tokyo Olympics Herford represented Australia as the stroke of an all Sydney Rowing Club men's coxed four. They placed tenth.
