= Jim Tew =

American rower

Personal information
- Born: October 29, 1944 (age 81) New York, New York, United States

Sport
- Sport: Rowing

Jim Tew (born October 29, 1944) is an American rower. He competed in the men's coxed four event at the 1964 Summer Olympics. He graduated from Harvard University.
