= Noriichi Yoshino =

Japanese rower (born 1943)

Personal information
- Nationality: Japanese
- Born: 8 April 1943 (age 82)

Sport
- Sport: Rowing

Noriichi Yoshino (芳野 法一, Yoshino Noriichi, born 8 April 1943) is a Japanese rower. He competed in the men's coxed four event at the 1964 Summer Olympics.
