= Hughie Pollock =

American rower

Personal information
- Born: July 16, 1942 (age 84) Boston, Massachusetts, United States

Sport
- Sport: Rowing

Hughie Pollock (born July 16, 1942) is an American rower. He competed in the men's coxed four event at the 1964 Summer Olympics. He graduated from Harvard University.
