= Bernhard Britting =

German rower (born 1940)

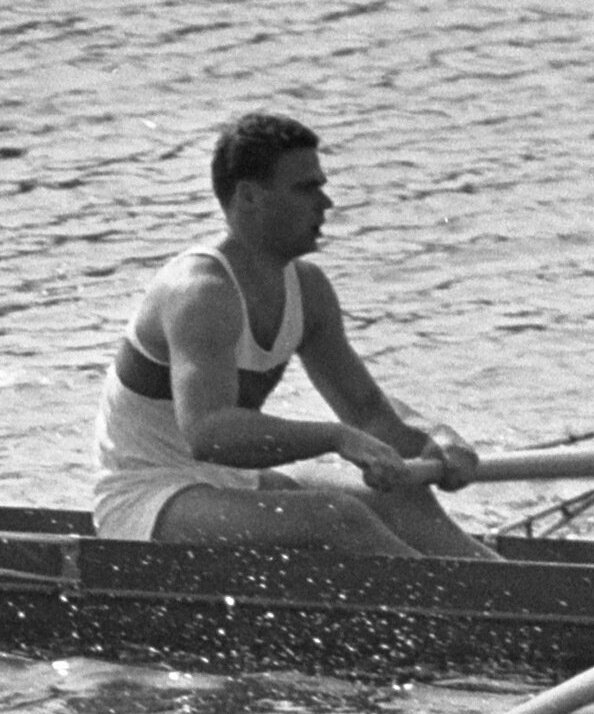
- Britting in 1964

Personal information
- Born: 22 October 1940 (age 85) Berlin, Germany
- Height: 1.89 m (6 ft 2 in)
- Weight: 88 kg (194 lb)

Sport
- Sport: Rowing
- Club: BRC, Berlin
Medal record
Men's rowing
Representing Germany
Olympic Games
Gold medal – first place	1964 Tokyo	Coxed four
Representing West Germany
World Rowing Championships
Gold medal – first place	1962 Lucerne	Coxed four
European Rowing Championships
Gold medal – first place	1963 Copenhagen	Coxed four
Silver medal – second place	1961 Prague	Eight
Silver medal – second place	1964 Amsterdam	Coxed four

Bernhard Britting (born 22 October 1940) is a retired German rower who had his best achievements in the coxed fours. In this event he won a world title in 1962, a European title in 1963 and a gold medal at the 1964 Summer Olympics.
