= Egbert Hirschfelder =

German rower (1942–2022)

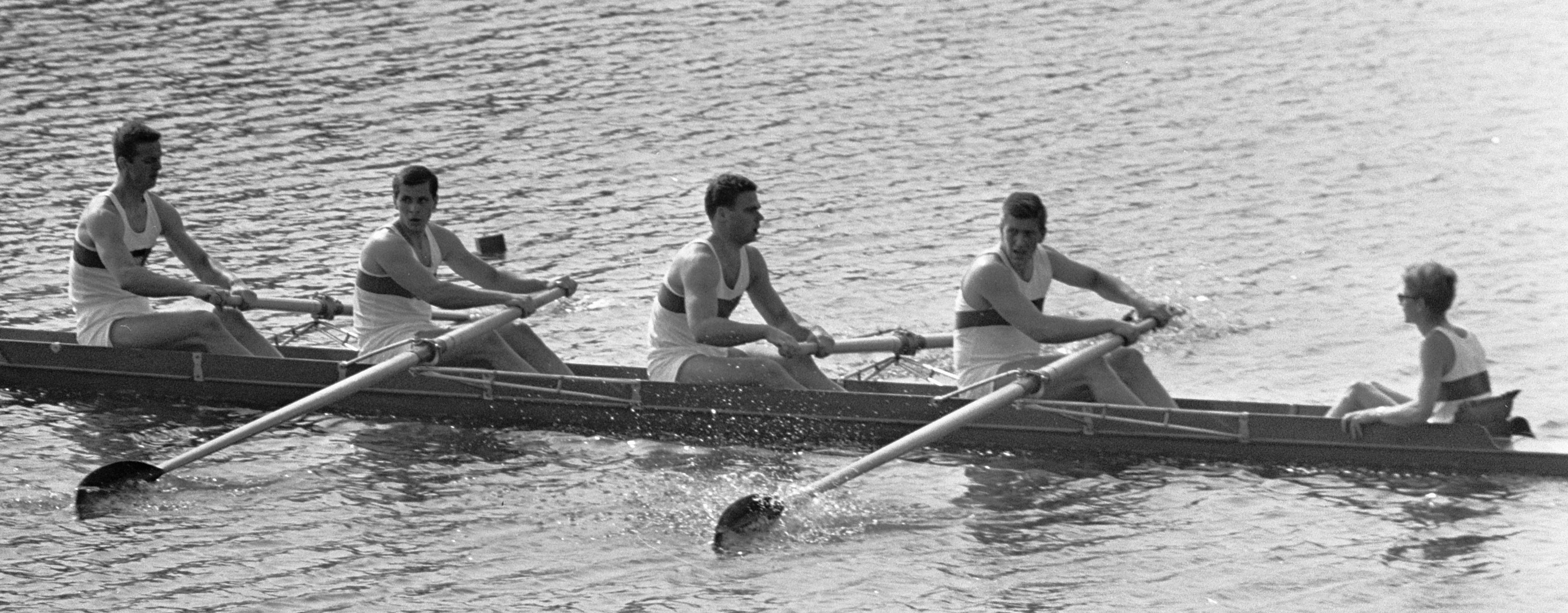
- German coxed four at the 1964 European Championships, Hirschfelder is first from left

Personal information
- Born: 13 July 1942 Berlin, Brandenburg, Prussia, Germany
- Died: 31 May 2022 (aged 79)
- Height: 1.96 m (6 ft 5 in)
- Weight: 97 kg (214 lb)

Sport
- Sport: Rowing
- Club: BRC, Berlin
Medal record
Representing Germany
Olympic Games
Gold medal – first place	1964 Tokyo	Coxed four
European Rowing Championships
Gold medal – first place	1963 Copenhagen	Coxed four
Silver medal – second place	1964 Amsterdam	Coxed four
Representing West Germany
Olympic Games
Gold medal – first place	1968 Mexico City	Eight
European Rowing Championships
Gold medal – first place	1967 Vichy	Eight

Egbert Hirschfelder (13 July 1942 – 31 May 2022) was a German rower. In 1963–1964 he won a European title and Olympic gold medal in the coxed four. He then changed to eight event and won another European title in 1967 and Olympic gold medal in 1968.
