= John Campbell (Australian rower) =

Australian rower

Personal information
- Nationality: Australian
- Born: 2 September 1942 (age 82)

Sport
- Sport: Rowing

John Campbell (born 2 September 1942) is an Australian rower. He competed in the men's coxed four event at the 1964 Summer Olympics.

== Club and state rowing ==
Campbell's senior rowing was from the Sydney Rowing Club.

At the 1964 Australian Rowing Championships Campbell contested both the coxless and coxed four championship and in a Sydney crew won the coxed four title and with it, selection for the Tokyo Olympics.

Campbell's sole state representative appearance came in 1964 when he was picked at five in the New South Wales senior eight which contested the King's Cup at the Interstate Championships held in Sydney.

== International representative rowing ==
At the 1964 Tokyo Olympics Campbell represented Australia in the three seat of an all Sydney Rowing Club men's coxed four. They placed tenth.
