= Paul Gunderson =

American rower

Personal information
- Nationality: American
- Born: May 21, 1943 (age 83) Odessa, Washington, United States

Sport
- Sport: Rowing

Paul Gunderson (born May 21, 1943) is an American rower. He competed in the men's coxed four event at the 1964 Summer Olympics. He graduated from Harvard University.
