= Jürgen Oelke =

German rower (born 1940)

Personal information
- Born: 25 November 1940 (age 85) Berlin, Germany
- Height: 1.70 m (5 ft 7 in)
- Weight: 55 kg (121 lb)

Sport
- Sport: Rowing
- Club: BRC, Berlin
Medal record
Men's rowing
Representing Germany
Olympic Games
Gold medal – first place	1964 Tokyo	Coxed four
Representing West Germany
World Rowing Championships
Gold medal – first place	1962 Lucerne	Coxed four
European Rowing Championships
Gold medal – first place	1963 Copenhagen	Coxed four
Silver medal – second place	1961 Prague	Eight
Silver medal – second place	1964 Amsterdam	Coxed four

Jürgen Oelke (born 25 November 1940) is a retired German rowing coxswain who had his best achievements in the coxed fours. In this event he won a world title in 1962, a European title in 1963 and a gold medal at the 1964 Summer Olympics.
