= Giovanni Spinola =

Italian rower (1935–2020)

Personal information
- Born: 31 July 1935 Gravedona, Italy
- Died: 19 October 2020 (aged 85) Gravedona, Italy
- Height: 1.65 m (5 ft 5 in)
- Weight: 53 kg (117 lb)

Sport
- Sport: Rowing
- Club: Canottieri Falck, Dongo
Medal record
Representing Italy
Olympic Games
Silver medal – second place	1964 Tokyo	Coxed four
European Rowing Championships
Bronze medal – third place	1964 Amsterdam	Coxed four

Giovanni Spinola (31 July 1935 – 19 October 2020) was an Italian rowing coxswain who had his best achievements in the coxed fours. In this event he won a silver medal at the 1964 Summer Olympics and a bronze at the 1964 European Championships.
