= Claude Pache =

French rower (1943–2020)

Personal information
- Nationality: French
- Born: 5 January 1943 Chambéry, France
- Died: 10 December 2020 (aged 77) Aix-les-Bains, France

Sport
- Sport: Rowing

Claude Pache (5 January 1943 – 10 December 2020) was a French rower. He competed in the men's coxed four event at the 1964 Summer Olympics. Pache died on 10 December 2020, at the age of 77.
