= Teppo Kesäläinen =

Finnish rower

Personal information
- Nationality: Finnish
- Born: 15 February 1942 (age 83); Pori, Finland

Sport
- Sport: Rowing

Teppo Kesäläinen (born 15 February 1942) is a Finnish rower. He competed in the men's coxed four event at the 1964 Summer Olympics.
