= Arnošt Poisl =

Czech rower

Personal information
- Nationality: Czech
- Born: 2 December 1939 (age 85)

Sport
- Sport: Rowing

Arnošt Poisl (born 2 December 1939) is a Czech rower. He competed in the men's coxed four event at the 1964 Summer Olympics.
