= Ole Paustian =

Danish rower

Personal information
- Nationality: Danish
- Born: 8 June 1937 (age 87); Frederiksberg, Denmark

Sport
- Sport: Rowing

Ole Paustian (born 8 June 1937) is a Danish rower. He competed in the men's coxed four event at the 1964 Summer Olympics.
