= Niels Nielsen (rower) =

Danish rower

Personal information
- Nationality: Danish
- Born: 26 January 1939 (age 86); Copenhagen, Denmark

Sport
- Sport: Rowing

Niels Nielsen (born 26 January 1939) is a Danish rower. He competed in the men's coxed four event at the 1964 Summer Olympics.
