= Bent Larsen (rowing) =

Danish rower

Personal information
- Nationality: Danish
- Born: 31 August 1942 (age 82); Copenhagen, Denmark

Sport
- Sport: Rowing

Bent Larsen (born 31 August 1942) is a Danish rower. He competed in the men's coxed four event at the 1964 Summer Olympics.
