= Hideaki Aida =

Japanese rower (born 1943)

Personal information
- Nationality: Japanese
- Born: 25 August 1943 (age 81)

Sport
- Sport: Rowing

Hideaki Aida (相田 秀晃, Aida Hideaki, born 25 August 1943) is a Japanese rower. He competed in the men's coxed four event at the 1964 Summer Olympics.
