= Jan Štefan =

Czech rower (born 1943)

Personal information
- Born: 2 September 1943 (age 82)
- Height: 183 cm (6 ft 0 in)
- Weight: 81 kg (179 lb)

Sport
- Sport: Rowing
Medal record
Men's rowing
Representing Czechoslovakia
European Rowing Championships
Silver medal – second place	1963 Copenhagen	Coxed four
Bronze medal – third place	1965 Duisburg	Coxed four

Jan Štefan (born 2 September 1943) is a Czech rower who represented Czechoslovakia. He competed at the 1964 Summer Olympics in Tokyo with the men's coxed four where they were eliminated in the round one repêchage.
