= Ibrahim Sayed Sabri =

Egyptian rower

Personal information
- Nationality: Egyptian
- Born: 31 August 1936 (age 88)

Sport
- Sport: Rowing

Ibrahim Sayed Sabri (born 31 August 1936) is an Egyptian rower. He competed in the men's coxed four event at the 1964 Summer Olympics.
