= Karel Karafiát =

Czech rower

Personal information
- Nationality: Czech
- Born: 21 October 1941 (age 84)

Sport
- Sport: Rowing
Medal record
Men's rowing
Representing Czechoslovakia
European Rowing Championships
| Silver medal – second place | 1963 Copenhagen | Coxed four |

Karel Karafiát (born 21 October 1941) is a Czech rower. He competed in the men's coxed four event at the 1964 Summer Olympics.
