= Mohamed Eissa =

Egyptian rower

Personal information
- Nationality: Egyptian
- Born: 15 May 1936 (age 89)

Sport
- Sport: Rowing

Mohamed Eissa (born 15 May 1936) is an Egyptian rower. He competed in the men's coxed four event at the 1964 Summer Olympics.
