= Yukio Matsuda =

Japanese rower (born 1942)

Personal information
- Nationality: Japanese
- Born: 12 March 1942 (age 83)

Sport
- Sport: Rowing

Yukio Matsuda (松田 征男, Matsuda Yukio, born 12 March 1942) is a Japanese rower. He competed in the men's coxed four event at the 1964 Summer Olympics.
