= Mahmoud Shehata =

Egyptian rower

Personal information
- Nationality: Egyptian
- Born: 11 December 1938 (age 86)

Sport
- Sport: Rowing

Mahmoud Shehata (born 11 December 1938) is an Egyptian rower. He competed in the men's coxed four event at the 1964 Summer Olympics.
