= Andrzej Nowaczyk =

Polish rower

Personal information
- Full name: Andrzej Jarosław Nowaczyk
- Nationality: Polish
- Born: 3 March 1939 (age 86); Poznań, Poland

Sport
- Sport: Rowing

Andrzej Jarosław Nowaczyk (born 3 March 1939) is a Polish rower. He competed in the men's coxed four event at the 1964 Summer Olympics.
