= Andrzej Bławdzin =

Polish cyclist (1938–2023)

Personal information
- Born: 19 August 1938 Płochocin, Poland
- Died: 10 April 2023 (aged 84)
- Height: 175 cm (5 ft 9 in)

Cycling career
- Sport: Cycling

Andrzej Bławdzin (19 August 1938 – 10 April 2023) was a Polish cyclist. He competed at the 1964 Summer Olympics and the 1968 Summer Olympics. He won the 1967 Tour de Pologne.

Bławdzin died on 10 April 2023, at the age of 84.
