= Thormod Næs =

Norwegian sport shooter (1930–1997)

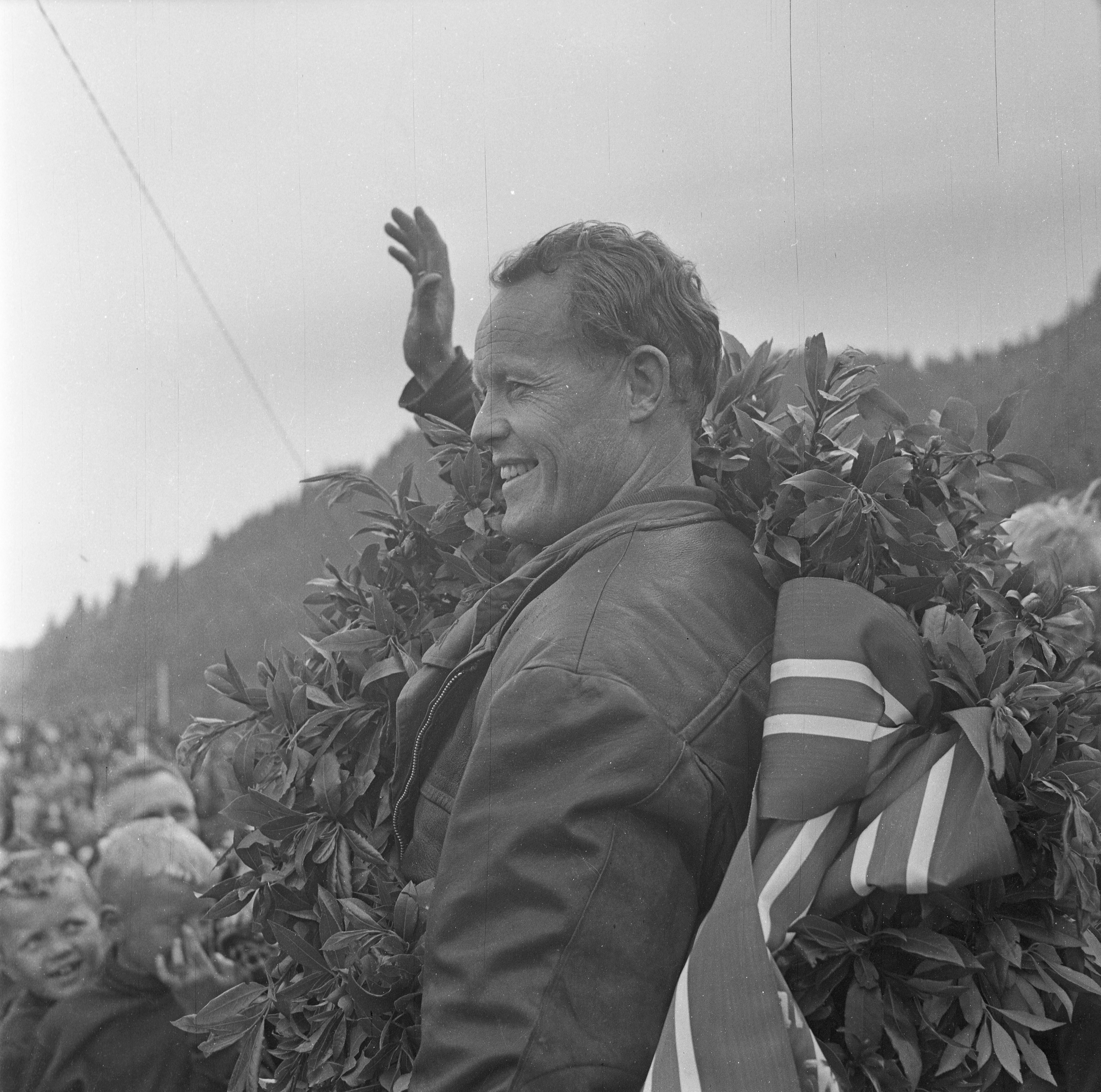
- Photo from 8 July 1967 by Eirik Sundvor

Personal information
- Nationality: Norwegian
- Born: 12 April 1930 Skjold, Norway
- Died: 20 October 1997 (aged 67) Fjell, Norway

Sport
- Sport: Sports shooting

Thormod Næs (12 April 1930 – 20 October 1997) was a Norwegian sport shooter. He was born in Vindafjord Municipality. He competed at the 1964 Summer Olympics in Tokyo.
