= Hideo Oe =

Japanese rower (born 1944)

Personal information
- Nationality: Japanese
- Born: 8 January 1944 (age 81)

Sport
- Sport: Rowing

Hideo Oe (大江 英雄, Ōe Hideo, born 8 January 1944) is a Japanese rower. He competed in the men's coxed four event at the 1964 Summer Olympics.
