= Masakatsu Yamanouchi =

Japanese rower (born 1942)

Personal information
- Nationality: Japanese
- Born: 1 June 1942 (age 82)

Sport
- Sport: Rowing

Masakatsu Yamanouchi (山内 政勝, Yamanouchi Masakatsu, born 1 June 1942) is a Japanese rower. He competed in the men's coxed four event at the 1964 Summer Olympics.
