= Vladimir Yevseyev =

Russian athlete

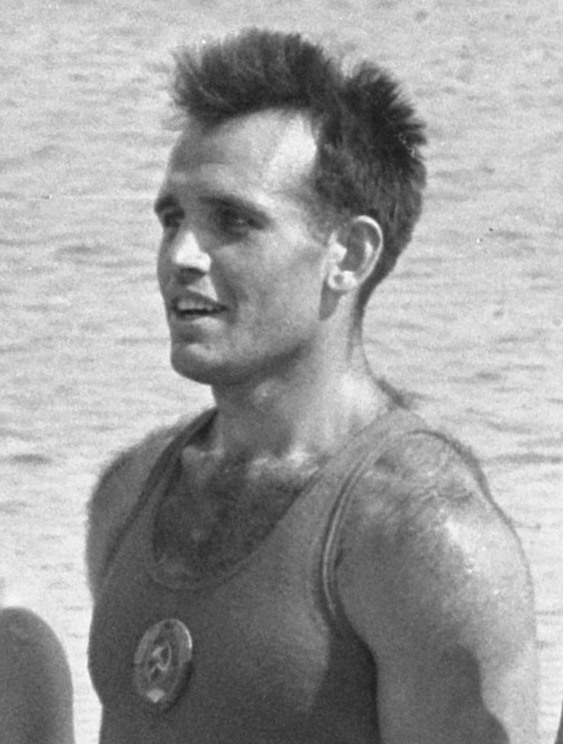
- Yevseyev in 1964

Personal information
- Born: 22 January 1939 Moscow, Russian SFSR, Soviet Union
- Died: 20 June 2012 (aged 73)
- Height: 1.81 m (5 ft 11 in)
- Weight: 87 kg (192 lb)

Sport
- Sport: Rowing
- Club: Spartak Moscow
Medal record
Representing the Soviet Union
World Rowing Championships
Silver medal – second place	1966 Bled	Coxed four
European Rowing Championships
Gold medal – first place	1964 Amsterdam	Coxed four
Gold medal – first place	1965 Duisburg	Coxed four

Vladimir Aleksandrovich Yevseyev (Russian: Владимир Александрович Евсеев, 22 January 1939 – 20 June 2012) was a Russian rower who had his best achievements in the coxed fours, partnering with Anatoly Luzgin, Anatoly Tkachuk, Boris Kuzmin and Vitaly Kurdchenko. In this event, they won two European titles and a silver medal at the 1966 World Rowing Championships; they finished in fifth place at the 1964 Summer Olympics.

In 1963 Yevseyev graduated from the Moscow State Aviation Technological University (MATI) with a diploma in pressure treatment of metals, and since 1964 till retirement taught at MATI. In 1973 he defended his PhDs on preparation of layered composite materials. Over the years he published 40 peer-reviewed articles and held 17 patents, five of which were applied in the industry.
