= Ryszard Lubicki =

Polish rower

Personal information
- Nationality: Polish
- Born: 3 September 1936; Mikaszewicze, Poland
- Died: 28 January 2003 (aged 66); Lublin, Poland

Sport
- Sport: Rowing

Ryszard Lubicki (3 September 1936 – 28 January 2003) was a Polish rower. He competed in the men's coxed four event at the 1964 Summer Olympics.
