= Jerzy Pawłowski (rowing) =

Polish rower

Personal information
- Nationality: Polish
- Born: 2 June 1935 (age 91) Radzyń Podlaski, Poland

Sport
- Sport: Rowing

Jerzy Pawłowski (born 2 June 1935) is a Polish rower. He competed in the men's coxed four event at the 1964 Summer Olympics.
