= Pekka Sylvander =

Finnish rower

Personal information
- Nationality: Finnish
- Born: 10 February 1943 (age 82); Salo, Finland

Sport
- Sport: Rowing

Pekka Sylvander (born 10 January 1943) is a Finnish rower. He competed at the 1964 Summer Olympics and the 1968 Summer Olympics.
