= Vitaly Kurdchenko =

Russian rower

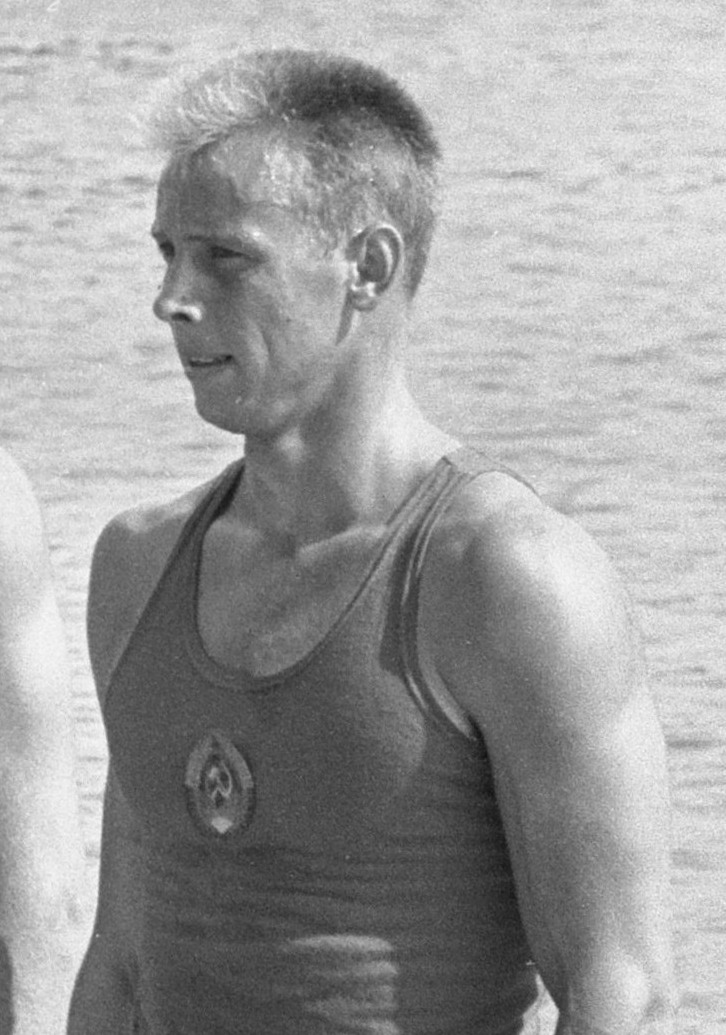
- Kurdchenko in 1964

Personal information
- Born: 23 September 1940 (age 85) Moscow, Russian SFSR, Soviet Union
- Height: 1.90 m (6 ft 3 in)
- Weight: 89 kg (196 lb)

Sport
- Sport: Rowing
- Club: Spartak Moscow
Medal record
Representing the Soviet Union
World Rowing Championships
Silver medal – second place	1966 Bled	Coxed four
European Rowing Championships
Gold medal – first place	1964 Amsterdam	Coxed four
Gold medal – first place	1965 Duisburg	Coxed four
Silver medal – second place	1969 Klagenfurt	Eight

Vitaly Dmitriyevich Kurdchenko (Russian: Виталий Дмитриевич Курдченко, born 23 September 1940) is a retired Russian rower who had his best achievements in the coxed fours, partnering with Vladimir Yevseyev, Anatoly Tkachuk, Boris Kuzmin and Anatoly Luzgin. In this event, they won two European titles and a silver medal at the 1966 World Rowing Championships; they finished in fifth place at the 1964 Summer Olympics. Kurdchenko also competed in the eight and won a European silver medal in 1969.
