= Uemura Masakatsu =

Japanese samurai of the Sengoku period

Uemura Masakatsu (植村 正勝, 1535–1592) was a Japanese samurai of the Sengoku period who served as one of three magistrates (san bugyo) for the Tokugawa clan. Masakatsu served Tokugawa Ieyasu from a young age, though he would side with a rioting monto group within the province of Mikawa in 1565. Around the time of the Odawara Campaign--1590—Masakatsu allegedly began to openly declare his dislike towards Toyotomi Hideyoshi, which resulted in the confiscation of his lands. During the year of 1599 Masakatsu's son Iemasa recovered his father's good name by some degree when he became a page to Tokugawa Hidetada. Seven years later Iemasa became a commander of ashigaru.

Masakatsu was a cousin of the Uemura family which ruled the Takatori Domain.
