= Marian Leszczyński =

Polish rower (1936–2020)

Personal information
- Nationality: Polish
- Born: 8 December 1936; Lwów, Poland
- Died: 31 December 2020 (aged 84); Toronto, Canada

Sport
- Sport: Rowing

Marian Leszczyński (8 December 1936 – 31 December 2020) was a Polish rower. He competed in the men's coxed four event at the 1964 Summer Olympics.
