= Joachim Werner (rower) =

German rower (1939–2010)

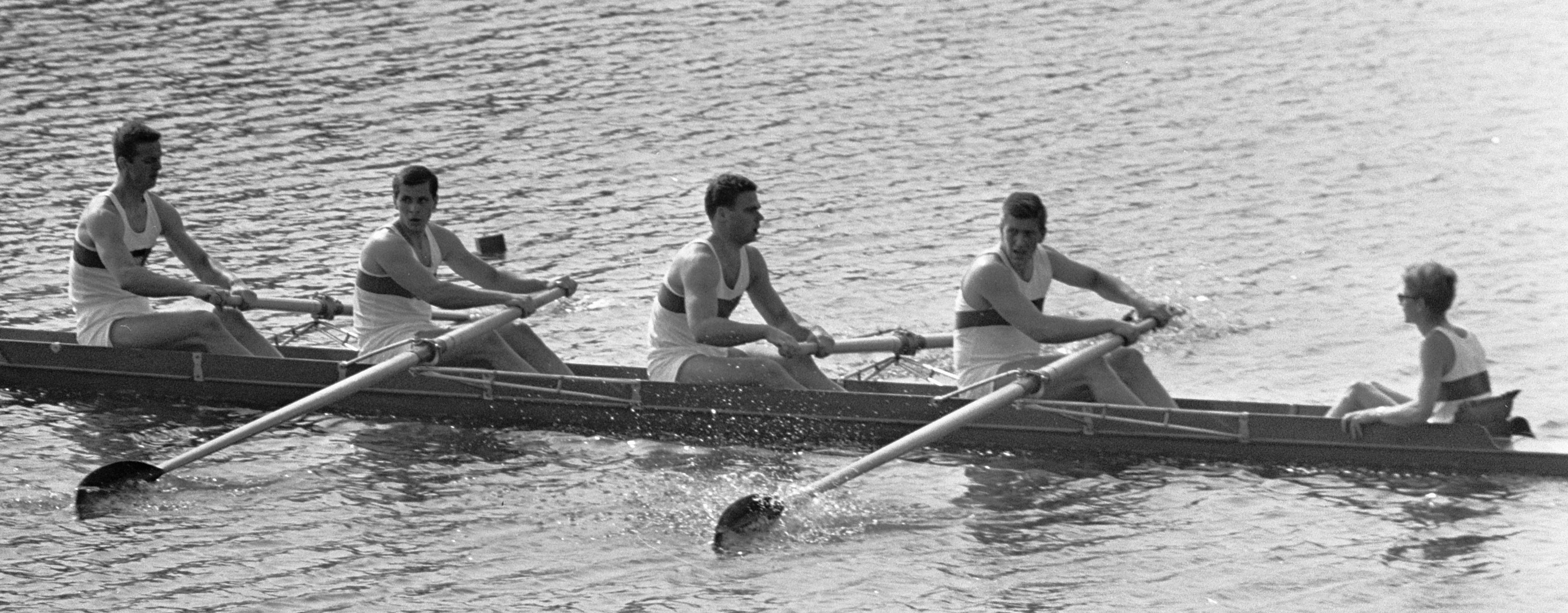
- German coxed four at the 1964 European Championships, Werner is second from left

Personal information
- Born: 19 July 1939 Berlin, Germany
- Died: 10 July 2010 (aged 70)
- Height: 1.90 m (6 ft 3 in)
- Weight: 89 kg (196 lb)

Sport
- Sport: Rowing
- Club: BRC, Berlin
Medal record
Representing Germany
Olympic Games
Gold medal – first place	1964 Tokyo	Coxed four
Representing West Germany
European Rowing Championships
Gold medal – first place	1963 Copenhagen	Coxed four
Silver medal – second place	1964 Amsterdam	Coxed four

Joachim Werner (19 July 1939 – 10 July 2010) was a German rower who specialized in the coxed four. In this event he won a European title in 1963 and a gold medal at the 1964 Summer Olympics.
