= Jaroslav Starosta =

Czech rower (born 1937)

Personal information
- Born: 21 April 1937 Prague, Czechoslovakia
- Died: 22 July 2022 (aged 85)
- Height: 184 cm (6 ft 0 in)
- Weight: 88 kg (194 lb)

Sport
- Sport: Rowing
Medal record
Men's rowing
Representing Czechoslovakia
European Rowing Championships
Silver medal – second place	1963 Copenhagen	Coxed four

Jaroslav Starosta (21 April 1937 – 22 July 2022) was a Czech rower who represented Czechoslovakia. He competed at the 1960 Summer Olympics in Rome with the men's coxless four where they came fourth.
