= Eilif Brodtkorb =

Norwegian rower

Eilif Magnus Brodtkorb (born 18 July 1936) is a retired Norwegian rower.

He was born in Holmestrand. Representing the club Bærum RK, he finished ninth in the coxed fours event at the 1964 Summer Olympics.

He now resides in Haslum, and has a fortune of about US$3 million.
