= Anatoly Tkachuk =

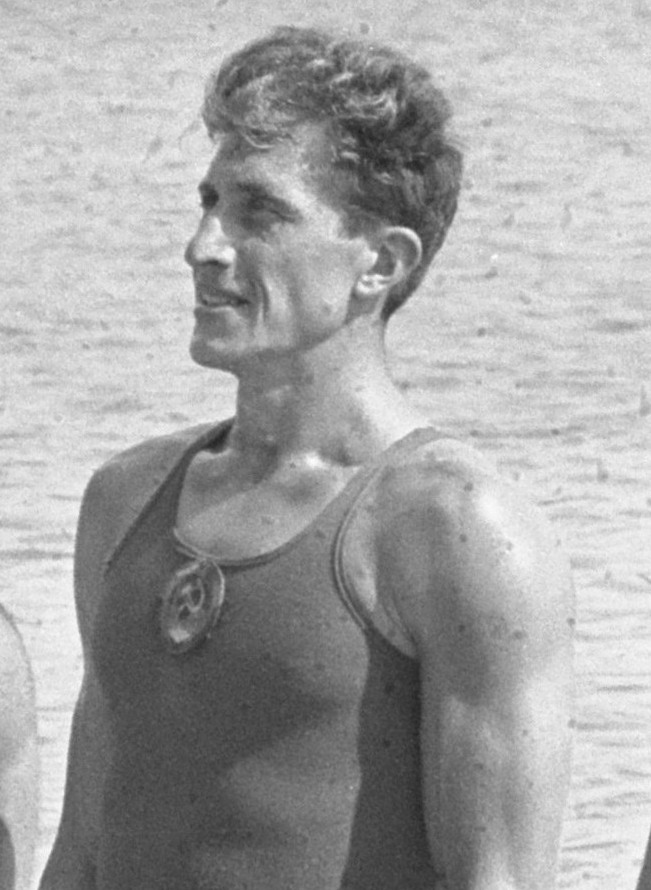
- Tkachuk in 1964

Personal information
- Full name: Anatoly Petrovych Tkachuk
- Born: 15 February 1937 Dniprodzerzhynsk, Ukrainian SSR, Soviet Union
- Died: 17 September 2017 (aged 80) Moscow, Russia
- Height: 1.91 m (6 ft 3 in)
- Weight: 92 kg (203 lb)

Sport
- Sport: Rowing
- Club: Spartak Moscow
Medal record
Representing the Soviet Union
World Championships
Silver medal – second place	1966 Bled	Coxed four
European Championships
Gold medal – first place	1964 Amsterdam	Coxed four
Gold medal – first place	1965 Duisburg	Coxed four
Silver medal – second place	1969 Klagenfurt	Eight

Anatoly Petrovych Tkachuk (Ukrainian: Анатолій Петрович Ткачук; 15 February 1937 – 17 September 2017) was a Ukrainian rower who had his best achievements in the coxed fours, partnering with Vladimir Yevseyev, Vitaly Kurdchenko, Boris Kuzmin and Anatoly Luzgin. In this event, they won two European titles and a silver medal at the 1966 World Rowing Championships; they finished in fifth place at the 1964 Summer Olympics. At the 1972 Summer Olympics, Kurdchenko rowed with a coxless four team of Igor Kashurov, Aleksandr Motin and Vitaly Sapronov and finished in fourth place. He also competed in the eight and won a European silver in 1969.
