= Salem Mashour =

Egyptian rower

Personal information
- Nationality: Egyptian
- Born: 20 November 1940 (age 84)

Sport
- Sport: Rowing

Salem Mashour (born 20 November 1940) is an Egyptian rower. He competed in the men's coxed four event at the 1964 Summer Olympics.
