= Ismo Kanerva =

Finnish rower (born 1942)

Personal information
- Nationality: Finnish
- Born: 3 June 1942 (age 84) Turku, Finland

Sport
- Sport: Rowing

Ismo Kanerva (born 3 June 1942) is a Finnish rower. He competed in the men's coxed four event at the 1964 Summer Olympics.
