= Boris Kuzmin =

Soviet rower

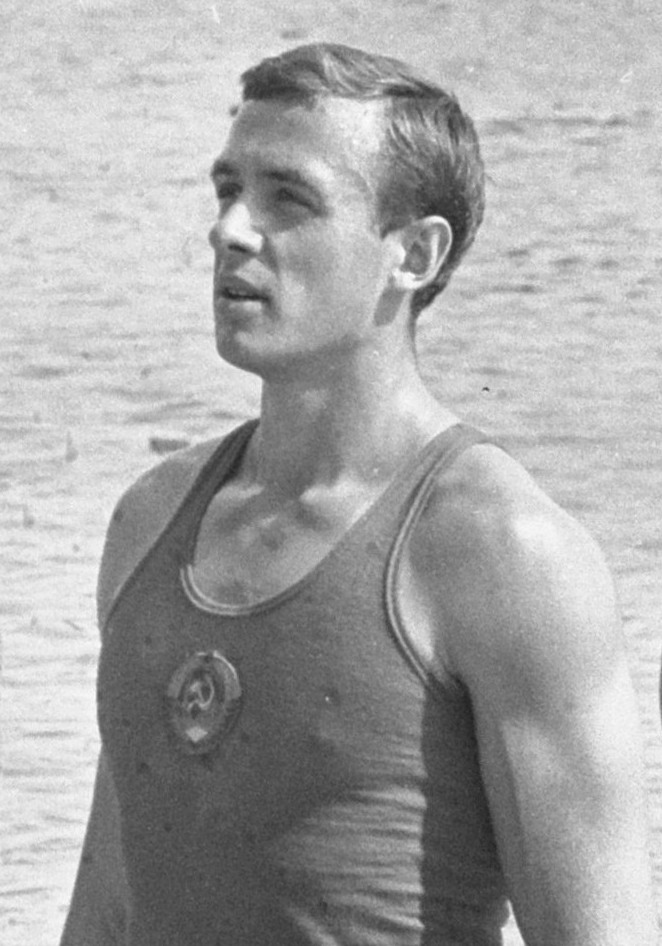
- Kuzmin in 1964

Personal information
- Born: 11 February 1941 Moscow, Russian SFSR, Soviet Union
- Died: 30 November 2001 (aged 60)
- Height: 1.95 m (6 ft 5 in)
- Weight: 92 kg (203 lb)

Sport
- Sport: Rowing
- Club: Spartak Moscow
Medal record
Representing the Soviet Union
World Rowing Championships
Silver medal – second place	1966 Bled	Coxed four
European Rowing Championships
Gold medal – first place	1964 Amsterdam	Coxed four
Gold medal – first place	1965 Duisburg	Coxed four

Boris Petrovich Kuzmin (Russian: Борис Петрович Кузьмин, 11 February 1941 – 30 November 2001) was a Soviet rower who had his best achievements in the coxed fours, partnering with Vladimir Yevseyev, Anatoly Tkachuk, Anatoly Luzgin and Vitaly Kurdchenko. In this event, they won two European titles and a silver medal at the 1966 World Rowing Championships; they finished in fifth place at the 1964 Summer Olympics.
