= Michel Dumas (rower) =

French rower

Personal information
- Nationality: French
- Born: 19 October 1944 (age 80)

Sport
- Sport: Rowing

Michel Dumas (born 19 October 1944) is a French rower. He competed in the men's coxed four event at the 1964 Summer Olympics.
