= Tom Pollock (rower) =

American rower (born 1943)

Personal information
- Born: July 24, 1943 Flagstaff, Arizona, United States
- Died: July 19, 2016 (aged 72)

Sport
- Sport: Rowing

Tom Pollock (July 24, 1943 – July 19, 2016) was an American rower. He competed in the men's coxed four event at the 1964 Summer Olympics. He graduated from Harvard University.
