= Rolf Syversen (rower) =

Norwegian rower

Personal information
- Nationality: Norwegian
- Born: 18 October 1948 (age 76)

Sport
- Sport: Rowing

Rolf Syversen (born 18 October 1948) is a Norwegian rower. He competed in the men's coxed four event at the 1964 Summer Olympics.
