= Birger Knudtzon =

Norwegian rower (born 1936)

Jens Birger Knudtzon (born 19 February 1936) is a retired Norwegian rower.

He was born in Oslo. Representing the club Bærum RK, he finished ninth in the coxed four event at the 1964 Summer Olympics.

He resides in Oslo, and has a fortune of about US$6.2 million.
