= Ingolf Kristiansen =

Norwegian rower (born 1938)

Ingolf Kristiansen (born 10 June 1938) is a retired Norwegian rower.

He was born at Kalvøya. Representing the club Bærum RK, he finished sixth in the coxed fours competition of the 1964 European Rowing Championships, and ninth in the same event at the 1964 Summer Olympics.

He spent his professional life, 51 years, as a shoemaker in Sandvika. He is now a park ranger at the island Kalvøya, where he still lives. In 2006 he was awarded the HM The King's Medal of Merit in silver for his effort as a park ranger.
