= Szczepan Grajczyk =

Polish rower

Personal information
- Nationality: Polish
- Born: 11 December 1931 (age 94) Tarnowskie Góry, Poland

Sport
- Sport: Rowing

Szczepan Grajczyk (11 December 1931 – 11 September 2015) was a Polish rower. He competed at the 1956 Summer Olympics and the 1964 Summer Olympics.
