= Jan Jankowicz =

Polish gymnast (1932–2019)

- Full name: Jan Władysław Jankowicz
- Born: 9 December 1932 Skarżysko-Kamienna, Second Polish Republic
- Died: 3 June 2019 (aged 86)
- Height: 1.64 m (5 ft 5 in)

Gymnastics career
- Discipline: Men's artistic gymnastics
- Country represented: Poland
- Club: Gwardia Warsaw

Jan Władysław Jankowicz (9 December 1932 – 3 June 2019) was a Polish gymnast. He competed in eight events at the 1964 Summer Olympics.
