= Anatoliy Luzgin =

Soviet rower (born 1931)

Anatoly Luzgin
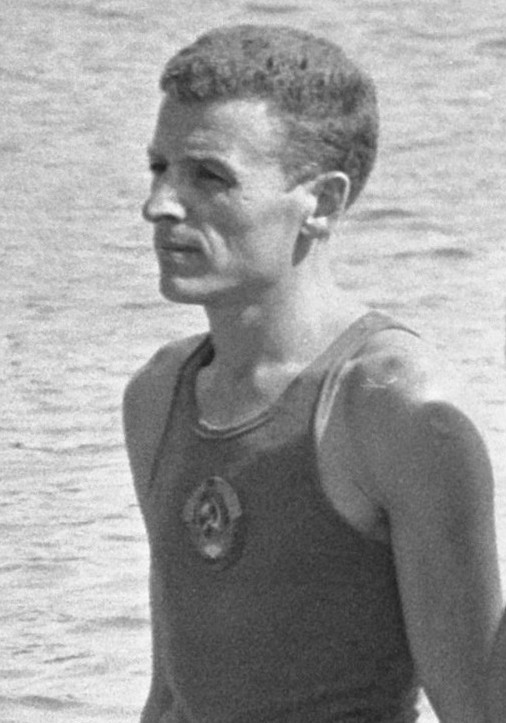
- Luzgin in 1964

Personal information
- Full name: Anatoly Alekseyevich Luzgin
- Born: 28 July 1931
- Height: 1.66 m (5 ft 5 in)
- Weight: 54 kg (119 lb)

Sport
- Sport: Rowing
Medal record
Representing the Soviet Union
World Championships
Silver medal – second place	1966 Bled	Coxed four
European Championships
Gold medal – first place	1964 Amsterdam	Coxed four
Gold medal – first place	1965 Duisburg	Coxed four

Anatoly Alekseevich Luzgin (Russian: Анатолий Алексеевич Лузгин, born 28 July 1931) is a retired Soviet coxswain who had his best achievements in the coxed fours, partnering with Vladimir Yevseyev, Anatoly Tkachuk, Boris Kuzmin and Vitaly Kurdchenko. In this event, they won two European titles and a silver medal at the 1966 World Rowing Championships; they finished in fifth place at the 1964 Summer Olympics.
