= Ismo Junni =

Finnish serial killer (1943-1995

- Born: Ismo Kullervo Junni; 27 June 1943; Finland
- Died: 3 November 1995 (aged 52); Helsinki, Finland
- Cause of death: Suicide
- Convictions: Murder; Arson
- Penalty: Life imprisonment

Details
- Victims: 5
- Span of crimes: 1980–1988
- Country: Finland
- Date apprehended: 1990

Ismo Kullervo Junni (27 June 1943 – 3 November 1995) was a Finnish serial killer and arsonist, who carried out several of his killings and arson in the Kivinokka summer camp area in Herttoniemi, Helsinki.

The defining characteristic of Junni's killings was that he removed his victim's teeth. For example, while killing his wife, he pulled out her teeth and later stole his friend's dental prosthesis, which he kept.

== Murders ==
Junni committed his first homicide in August 1980, when he killed his wife Kaija in Kontula. He was questioned on the matter, but there was insufficient evidence against him, and the case was recorded as an accident.

Junni committed his next murders at the Kivinokka summer camp, in Herttoniemi, in June 1986. In this case, his colleagues Seppo Mäntyniemi and Juha Väre were the victims. He then set fire to the crime scene.

In July 1986, Junni killed his friend, Matti Haapanen, and then set fire to his summer home.

The last death occurred in 1988 when Junni burned Pauli Sironen alive in his summer home.

Junni showed particular interest in cadavers, and often visited the mortuary.

== Arrest ==
In 1990 Junni's now grown-up son revealed to the police that the death of his mother had not indeed been an accident. In fact, he had been preparing to leave for school on the morning when he saw his father stomping on his mother's head and dragging her unconscious body into the bathtub. Junni was taken in for interrogation, where he first confessed to his wife's murder. However, police later found out that a man named Matti Haapanen, who they needed for interrogation regarding the killing, had actually burned up with his small summer cottage in Kivinokka a few years earlier. The investigators grew suspicious after Matti's wife told them that after her husband's death, Junni had started to tell odd stories about how he had actually been at the scene of the fire that day.

After being questioned about the case, Junni slowly cracked and described in every detail how he and Matti had gotten drunk at Matti's cottage that night. This resulted in a brawl between the two men. Junni then bashed his friend over the head with a huge glass bowl, stole his dental prosthesis, and yanked out one of his own teeth before setting the house in flames. When the investigation went on, a number of deaths by house fire in the area were discovered. Junni confessed in detail to all his killings over the years and was able to be connected to the events.

In the Municipal Court in Helsinki, Junni recanted his confession and claimed that he was trying to please his examiners. However, he was found guilty of the murder of his wife, Seppo Mäntyniemi, Juha Väre, Matti Haapanen and Pauli Sironen, as well as arson, and sentenced to life imprisonment in February 1992.

The Helsinki Appellate Court changed his wife's death from assault to negligent homicide; however, the penal sanction did not change. Junni killed himself in 1995.

== See also ==
- List of serial killers by country

== Sources ==
- Pohjolan poliisi kertoo 1993 (Hammasmurhaaja)
- Hannes Markkula [in Finnish] (1994). Suomalainen murha ("Finnish murder") 1991-1994 (in Finnish). Helsinki. pp. 13–17. ISBN 951-96267-2-7.
- "Kivinokan surmaajalle kolme elinkautista taposta ja murhista". Helsingin Sanomat (Kotimaa) (in Finnish). 7 February 1992.
- "Selvittämättömät henkirikokset kartalla" [Map of unexplained homicides] (in Finnish). murha.info. March 2023.
