= Tor Ahlsand =

Norwegian rower

Tor Ahlsand (born 22 August 1931) is a retired Norwegian rower. He was born in Aker. Representing the club Bærum RK, he finished ninth in the coxed fours event at the 1964 Summer Olympics. He has later represented Christania RK and won two gold medals in the World Masters Games.
