= Abdullah Ali (rower) =

Egyptian rower

Personal information
- Nationality: Egyptian
- Born: 3 May 1936 (age 89)

Sport
- Sport: Rowing

Abdullah Ali (born 3 May 1936) is an Egyptian rower. He competed in two events at the 1964 Summer Olympics.
