= Marius Klumperbeek =

Dutch rower

Personal information
- Born: 7 August 1938 (age 87) Batavia, Dutch East Indies
- Height: 1.63 m (5 ft 4 in)
- Weight: 51 kg (112 lb)

Sport
- Sport: Rowing
- Club: Njord, Leiden
Medal record
Representing Netherlands
Olympic Games
Bronze medal – third place	1964 Tokyo	Coxed four

Marius Pieter Louis Klumperbeek (born 7 August 1938) is a retired Dutch coxswain who competed in the 1960 and 1964 Summer Olympics. In 1960 his coxed four team was eliminated in the semi-finals; he won a bronze medal in the same event four years later.
