= Lex Mullink =

Dutch rower

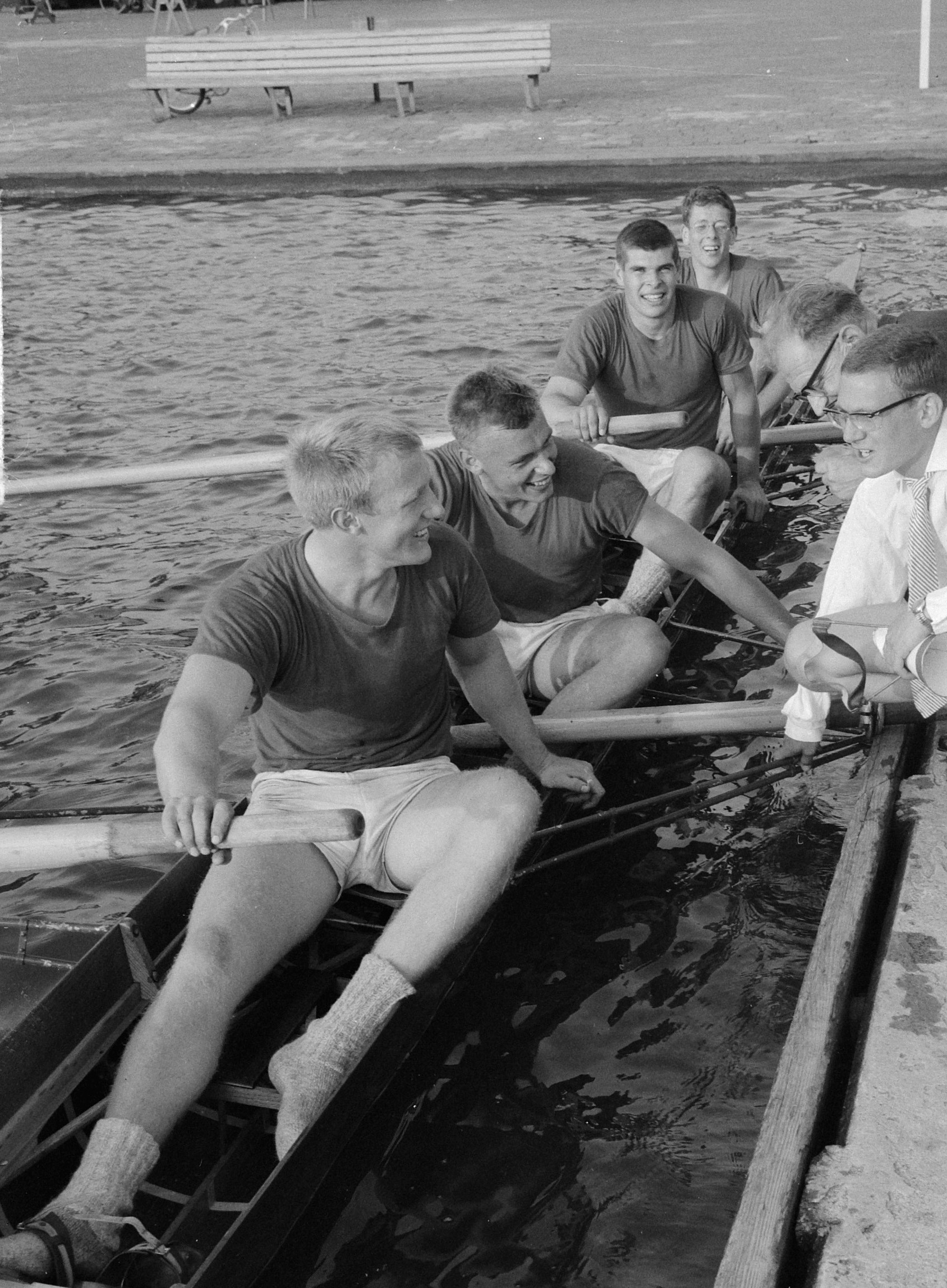
- Mullink (front) with his Olympic teammates Jan, Freek and Bobbie van de Graaff in 1964

Personal information
- Born: 19 December 1944 (age 81) Almelo, Netherlands
- Height: 1.89 m (6 ft 2 in)
- Weight: 90 kg (200 lb)

Sport
- Sport: Rowing
- Club: Laga, Delft
Medal record
Representing the Netherlands
Olympic Games
| Bronze medal – third place | 1964 Tokyo | Coxed four |

Alex Gerhard "Lex" Mullink (born 19 December 1944) is a retired Dutch rower who won a bronze medal in the coxed fours at the 1964 Summer Olympics.
