= Graf (surname) =

Graf is an ancient German and Swiss rooted name. In the United States, there are 16,620 people with this last name making it the 2445th most popular surname. Some notable people with this surname include:

- Al Graf (born 1958), American politician and attorney
- Alesia Graf (1980–2024), Belarusian-born German professional boxer
- Alexander Graf (born 1962), Uzbekistani-German chess grandmaster
- Alicia Graf Mack (born 1978/79), American dancer and teacher
- Allan Graf (born 1949), American athlete, actor, stuntman and director
- Angelika Graf (born 1947), German politician
- Anton Graf (1811-1867), German theologian, private docent at University of Tübingen
- Andreas Christoph Graf (1701–1776), teacher, poet & author of "Der höfliche Schüler" (1745)
- Andreas Graf (born 1985), Australian track cyclist
- Béatrice Graf (born 1964), Swiss musician
- Bernadette Graf (born 1992), German judoka
- Carl Graf (1892–1947), American painter
- Conrad Graf (1782–1851), Austrian-German pianoforte builder
- Christian Ernst Graf (1723–1804), from 1764 on called "Graaf", German/Netherland composer (Johann's son)
- Christoph Graf (born 1961), 35th Commander of the Pontifical Swiss Guard
- Claudio Graf (born 1976), Argentine football coach and former player
- Clyde Graf, New Zealand politician
- Collin Graf (born 2002), American ice hockey player
- Dajuan Graf (born 1962), American basketball player
- Daniel Graf (born 1977), German football player
- Dominik Graf (born 1952), German film director
- Edward L. Graf (1878-?), American politician
- Elfi Graf (born 1952), Austrian folk singer
- Emma Graf (1865–1926), Swiss historian, teacher, suffragist
- Ernst Graf (1909–1988), Swiss artist
- Erwin Graf (1917–2005), American basketball player
- Friedrich Graf
- Friedrich Hartmann Graf (1727–1795), German composer (Johann's son)
- Georg Graf (1875–1955), German Orientalist
- Gismo Graf (born 1992), German musician
- Haakon Graf (born 1955), Norwegian musician
- Hannah Graf, former officer of the British Army and a transgender rights activist
- Hedy Graf (1926–1997), Spanish-born Swiss soprano
- Herbert Graf (1903–1973), Austrian-American opera producer
- Hermann Graf (1912–1988), German Luftwaffe World War II fighter ace
- Holly Graf (born c. 1963), U.S. naval officer
- Jake Graf, English actor
- Jessica Graf (born 1990), American reality television personality, actress, and model
- Jochen Graf (1989), American soccer player
- Joe Graf Jr. (born 1998), American professional stock car racing driver
- Johann Graf (composer) (1684–1750), German composer (father of Friedrich C. and Christian E. Graf)
- Johann Graf (born 1946), Austrian businessman and billionaire
- John Graf (born 1968), Canadian rugby player
- Jürgen Graf (1951–2025), Swiss author, translator, and historical negationist
- Jürgen-Peter Graf (born 1952), German lawyer and judge
- Karl Heinrich Graf (1815–1869), German Old Testament scholar and orientalist
- Katharina Graf (1873–1936), Austrian politician
- Kathryn Graf (born 1958), American actress and playwright
- Kevin Graf (born 1991), American football offensive tackle
- Klaus Graf (born 1969), German racing driver
- Leopold Graf-Selinger (born 1967), Austrian Architect & Urbanist (Arch. without Frontiers), former diplomat. service, later on Ambassador of "good will", Researcher & Author
- Lisa Graf (born 1992), German swimmer
- Luca Maria Graf (born 1999), German football player
- Marcus Graf (born 1974), German art curator, writer and artist based in Istanbul
- Markus Graf (born 1959), Swiss ice hockey player, coach, and executive
- Martin Graf (born 1960), Austrian politician
- Max Graf (1873–1958), Austrian composer and music critic
- Maya Graf (born 1962), Swiss politician
- Michael Graf, Italian luger
- Mirosław Graf (born 1959), Polish ski jumper
- Oskar Maria Graf (1894–1967), German poet and novelist
- Otto Graf (1892–1971), German politician
- Paul David Graf (1950–2001), American actor
- Peter Graf (1938–2013), German tennis coach
- Peter Graf (painter) (born 1937), German painter
- Peter-Lukas Graf (1929–2025), Swiss flautist
- Rahel Graf (born 1989), Swiss footballer
- Randy Graf (born 1957), former member of the Arizona State House
- Rebekah Graf, American actress
- Rick Graf (born 1964), American football linebacker
- Robert Graf (1923–1966), German actor
- Rolf Graf (cyclist) (1932–2019), Swiss cyclist
- Rolf Graf (musician) (1960–2013), Norwegian musician
- Santiago Graf (1845–1904), Swiss-born brewer and businessman in Mexico
- Shaun Graf (born 1957), Australian first-class cricketeer
- Sonja Graf (1908–1965), German and American chess player
- Steffi Graf (born 1969), German tennis player
- Susanne Graf (born 1992), German politician
- Ulrich Graf (1878–1950), early member of the Nazi Party
- Urs Graf (1485 – c. 1529), Swiss Renaissance painter and engraver
- Stephanie Graf (born 1973), Austrian athlete
- Werner Graf (born 1980), German politician
- Willi Graf (1918–1943), German martyr of 20th century, member of the White Rose resistance group in Nazi Germany
- Wolfram Graf (born 1965), German composer, pianist and organist

== People with surname Graef ==
- Botho Graef (1857–1917), German classical archaeologist and art historian
- Carlos Graef Fernández (1911–1988), Mexican physicist and mathematician
- Edward Graef (1842–1922), American wine merchant and amateur entomologist
- Garry De Graef (born 1974), Belgian footballer
- Gustav Graef (1821–1895), German painter of portraits and historical subjects
- Jed Graef (born 1942), American swimmer
- Luther W. Graef, American founder of the company GRAEF
- Maurice Graef (born 1969), Dutch footballer
- Roger Graef (1936–2022), American-born, British documentary filmmaker and theatre director

== See also ==
- Graff (disambiguation)
- Graaf (disambiguation)
- Graf
- Grafs (disambiguation)
- Gref
- De Graeff
- Groff
