= De Graaf =

De Graaf (IPA: [də ˈɣraːf]) is a Dutch occupational surname. With over 21,000 people, it was the 24th most common name in the Netherlands in 2007. In modern Dutch de graaf means the count, but in the past it also referred to the head of the municipal council called schepen. A common variant form is De Graaff, with 4632 people in 2007. In Belgium, the form De Graef is most common, with 1017 people in 2018. People with the surname include:

- Aad de Graaf (1939–1995), Dutch track cyclist
- Aileen de Graaf (born 1990), Dutch darts player
- Anne de Graaf (born 1959), American-born Dutch children's writer, journalist and translator
- Annelotte de Graaf (born 1988), Dutch pop singer-songwriter known as "Amber Arcades"
- Arie de Graaf (born 1947), Dutch PvdA politician
- Beatrice de Graaf (born 1975), Dutch historian and terrorism expert
- Door de Graaf (1920–2011), British-Dutch resistance member and translator who worked for the Special Operations Executive, later a campaigner for mental health support in the Netherlands.
- Edwin de Graaf (born 1980), Dutch footballer
- Elles de Graaf (born 1975), Dutch trance-singer
- Esmee de Graaf (born 1997), Dutch football forward
- Fred de Graaf (born 1950), Dutch VVD politician
- H. J. de Graaf (1899–1984), Dutch historian of Java
- Hermine de Graaf (1951–2013), Dutch novelist
- Isaak de Graaf (1668–1743), Dutch map maker
- Ivar de Graaf (born 1973), Dutch drummer
- Jaan de Graaf (born 1955), Dutch footballer
- Jeffrey de Graaf (born 1990), Dutch born Swedish darts player
- Laurens de Graaf (c.1653–1704), Dutch pirate, mercenary, and naval officer
- Lawrence B. de Graaf (born 1932), American historian
- Louw de Graaf (1930–2020), Dutch CDA politician
- Machiel de Graaf (born 1950), Dutch politician and physical therapist
- Nan Dirk de Graaf (born 1958), Dutch sociologist
- Peter DeGraaf (born 1957), American (Kansas) politician
- Regnier de Graaf (1641–1673), Dutch physician and anatomist who discovered Graafian follicles and G-spot
- Reinier de Graaf (born 1964), Dutch architect
- Thom de Graaf (born 1957), Dutch jurist and D66 politician, Deputy Prime Minister of the Netherlands
- Willem de Graaf (born c.1951), Dutch-born New Zealand footballer

De Graaff

- Anton P. de Graaff (1928–2008), Dutch writer
- Bart de Graaff (1967–2002), Dutch television presenter, comedian and creator
- Christian de Graaff (born 1950s), Botswana Minister of Agriculture
- Dieuwke de Graaff-Nauta (1930–2008), Dutch politician
- Gerrit de Graaff (1931–1996), South African zoologist after whom the De Graaff's Soft-furred Mouse is named
- James de Graaff-Hunter (1881–1967), British-born geodesist
- Jan de Graaff (1943–2014), Dutch television journalist
- Johannes de Graaff (1729–1813), Dutch Governor of Sint Eustatius; first to salute an American ship
- Liesbeth Pascal-de Graaff (born 1946), Dutch rower
- Marcel de Graaff (born 1962), Dutch politician
- Rein de Graaff (born 1942), Dutch jazz pianist
- Sander de Graaf (born 1995), Dutch rower
- Simon de Graaff (1861–1953), Dutch Minister of Colonies 1919–1925
- Suzanna Catharina de Graaff (1905–1968), Dutch Romanov impostor
- Willem de Graaff (1923–2004), Dutch astronomer after whom the asteroid 10964 Degraaff is named
- Wim de Graaff (1931–2021), Dutch speed skater

DeGraaf

- David DeGraaf (born 1971), American Handball player
- Ken DeGraaf, American politician from Colorado

DeGraff

- Geoffrey DeGraff (born 1949), birth name of American Buddhist monk Ṭhānissaro Bhikkhu

== See also ==
- De Graaf (restaurant), former Dutch Michelin starred restaurant
- De Graaff Brothers, Dutch horticultural family company founded in 1723
- De Graeff, old Dutch patrician family
- De Greef, surname of the same origin
- Van de Graaf (surname) or Van de Graaff, Duch toponymic surname
