= Graaf =

Graaf (the Dutch word for Count) or Graaff is a surname. Notable people with the surname include:

== People ==
- Carlo Graaff (1914–1975), German politician
- Hannah Graaf (born 1978), Swedish glamour model and singer
- Magdalena Graaf (born 1975), Swedish model, singer, and author
- Sir David Graaff, 1st Baronet (1859 –1931), South African cold storage magnate and politician
- De Villiers Graaff (1913–1999), South African politician
- Hansie Graaff (born 1989), South African rugby player
- Jannie Graaff (1928–2015), South African welfare economist

== See also ==
- De Graaf or De Graaff, Dutch surname
- Van de Graaf (surname), Van de Graaff' or Van der Graaf, Dutch surname
- Graf (surname)
