= Groff (surname) =

Surname list

Groff is an anglicized form of the surname Graf or Graff and of predominantly Swiss and sometimes German origin. Notable people with the surname include:

- Jonathan Groff (born 1985), American actor and singer
- Jonathan Groff, American comedy writer
- Lauren Groff (born 1978), American writer
- Mike Groff (born 1961), American racing driver
- Peter Groff (born 1963), American politician from Colorado
- Richard F. "Regis" Groff (1935-2014), American politician from Colorado
- Robbie Groff (born 1966), American racing driver
- Ulysses Grant Groff (1865–1950), American landowner and philanthropist
- Skip Groff (1948–2019), American record producer
- Sarah True (née Groff, born 1981), American triathlete
