= Van de Graaf =

Van de Graaf, Van de Graaff or Van der Graaf may refer to:

- Van de Graaff (crater), a lunar crater
- Van de Graaf (surname), includes a list of people with the surname and its variants
- Van de Graaff generator, an electrostatic generator named for Robert Van de Graaff
- Van der Graaf Generator, English progressive rock band named after the generator
- Van de Graaff accelerator, a type of particle accelerator
- "Van Der Graaff", a song by British indie rock band The Courteeners
