= USS Cowpens (CG-63) =

Ticonderoga-class cruiser

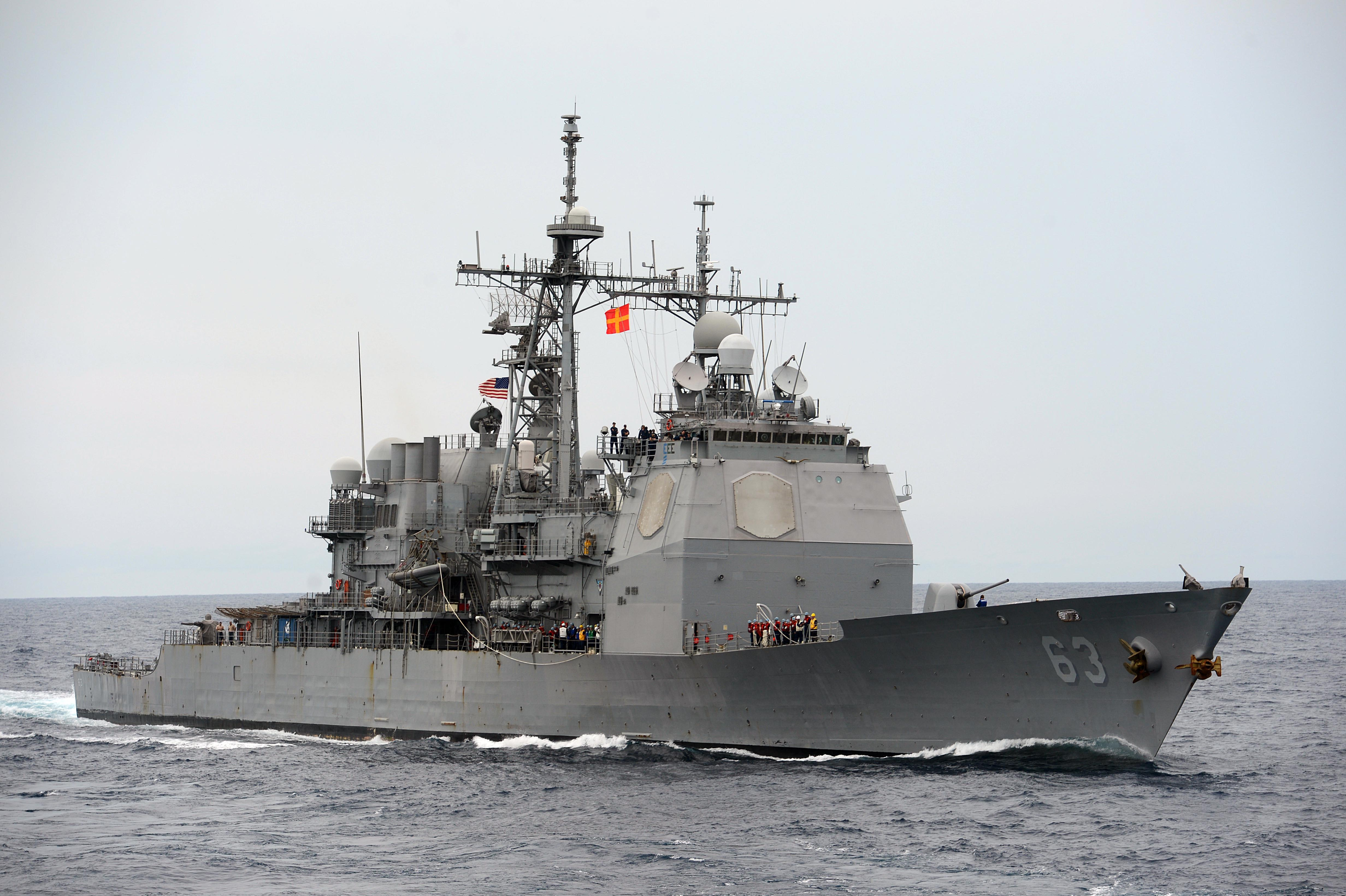
- USS Cowpens in the South China Sea on 24 October 2013

History

United States
- Name: Cowpens
- Namesake: Battle of Cowpens
- Ordered: 8 January 1986
- Builder: Bath Iron Works
- Laid down: 23 December 1987
- Launched: 11 March 1989
- Sponsored by: Lucy Mustin
- Commissioned: 9 March 1991
- Decommissioned: 28 August 2024
- Stricken: 30 August 2024
- Identification: Call sign: NCOW; Hull number: CG-63
- Motto: Victoria Libertatis Vindex; (Victory Vindicates Liberty)
- Nickname(s): The Mighty Moo
- Status: Decommissioned, sent to Reserve Fleet
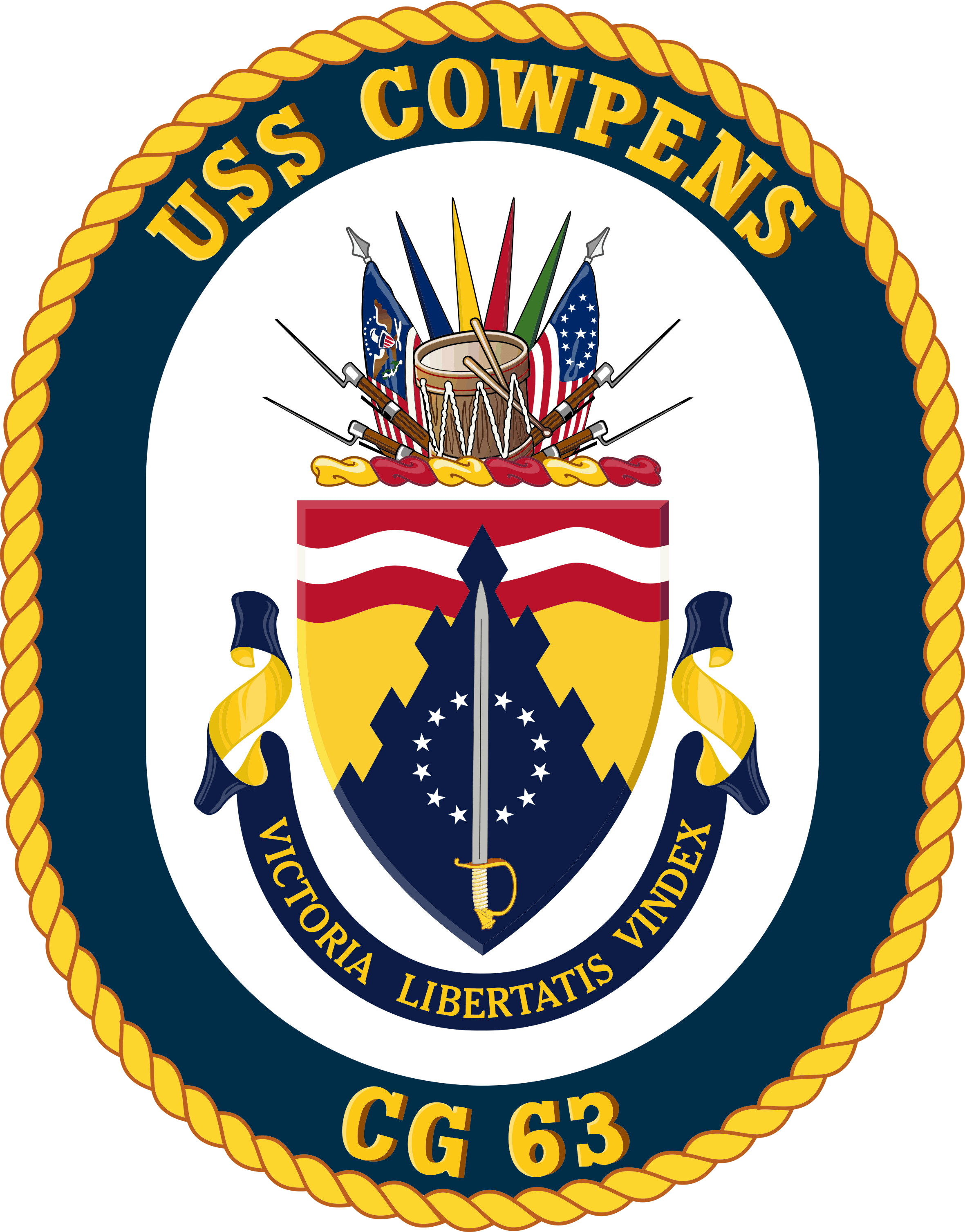
- Badge

General characteristics
- Class & type: Ticonderoga-class cruiser
- Displacement: Approx. 9,600 long tons (9,800 t) full load
- Length: 567 feet (173 m)
- Beam: 55 feet (16.8 meters)
- Draft: 34 feet (10.2 meters)
- Propulsion: 4 × General Electric LM2500 gas turbine engines; 2 × controllable-reversible pitch propellers; 2 × rudders
- Speed: 32.5 knots (60 km/h; 37.4 mph)
- Complement: 30 officers and 300 enlisted
- Sensors & processing systems: AN/SPY-1A/B multi-function radar; AN/SPS-49 air search radar (Removed on some ships); AN/SPG-62 fire control radar; AN/SPS-73 surface search radar; AN/SPQ-9 gun fire control radar; AN/SQQ-89(V)1/3 - A(V)15 Sonar suite, consisting of: AN/SQS-53B/C/D active sonar; AN/SQR-19 TACTAS, AN/SQR-19B ITASS, & MFTA passive sonar; AN/SQQ-28 light airborne multi-purpose system
- Armament: 2 × 61 cell Mk 41 vertical launch systems containing; 122 × mix of: RIM-66M-5 Standard SM-2MR Block IIIB; RIM-156A SM-2ER Block IV; RIM-161 SM-3; RIM-162A ESSM; RIM-174A Standard ERAM; BGM-109 Tomahawk; RUM-139A VL-ASROC; 8 × RGM-84 Harpoon missiles; 2 × 5 in (127 mm)/62 caliber Mark 45 Mod 4 lightweight gun; 2 × Mk 38 25 mm Machine Gun Systems; 2–4 × .50 in (12.7 mm) cal. machine gun; 2 × Phalanx CIWS Block 1B; 2 × Mk 32 12.75 in (324 mm) triple torpedo tubes
- Aircraft carried: 2 × MH-60R Seahawk LAMPS Mk III helicopters.

USS Cowpens (CG-63) is a decommissioned Ticonderoga-class guided missile cruiser in service with the United States Navy from 1991 to 2024. The ship is named after the Battle of Cowpens, a major American victory near Cowpens, South Carolina, in the American Revolution. She was built at the Bath Iron Works in Maine. Cowpens was last stationed at Naval Base San Diego.

== History ==
=== 1980s and 1990s ===
Cowpens' keel was laid 23 December 1987, at Bath Iron Works; she was launched 11 March 1989, and sponsored by Lucy Mustin, wife of Vice Admiral Henry C. Mustin. Cowpens was commissioned 9 March 1991 in Charleston, South Carolina, In January 1993, Cowpens was one of four ships to launch Tomahawk missiles against a nuclear production facility in Iraq.

In June 1994, Cowpens deployed with USS Kitty Hawk (CV-63) and her Battlegroup to the Korean Peninsula during the 1994 Nuclear Crisis in the region. On 12 July, she took part in a search for wreckage from NL-102, an F-14A from VF-51 that crashed the previous night aboard Kitty Hawk. On 30 August, Cowpens was overflown by two ROCAF F-5 Tigers while moving to rejoin the Kitty Hawk Battlegroup following a port visit to British Hong Kong. Between 8-12 November, Cowpens and the Kitty Hawk Battlegroup joined with several JSMDF units to participate in ANNUALEX 06G. The Battlegroup returned on 22 December.

Cowpens made another deployment with Kitty Hawk on 11 October 1996. While making her way to the Persian Gulf in late November, the ship avoided Typhoon Carlo. During mid-December, a visit to Bahrain was cut short as Cowpens was ordered to observe the firing of Iranian C-802 cruise missiles from Jask. In January 1997, the ship would win her fifth Battle E award.

Cowpens's ELINT crew detected a Chinese-flagged vessel on 3 February 1997. The vessel was smuggling Iraqi oil illegally in violation of UN Sanctions and was seized by USS Nicholson (DD-982) and USS Cushing (DD-985) in coordination with HSL-16 Det.8. On 8 February the ship took part in an exercise that successfully integrated the Kitty Hawk Battlegroup into the Theater Ballistic Missile Defense (TBMD), which included MIM-104 Patriot missile sites in Bahrain and USSPACECOM assets in space. The ship returned to San Diego on 11 April 1997.

=== 2000s ===
In August 2000, an Aegis fire controlman died when he fell from the main mast of Cowpens.

In March 2003, Cowpens, assigned to Carrier Group Five, became the first United States Navy ship to launch ordnance in the opening stages of the Iraq War, firing Tomahawk cruise missiles.

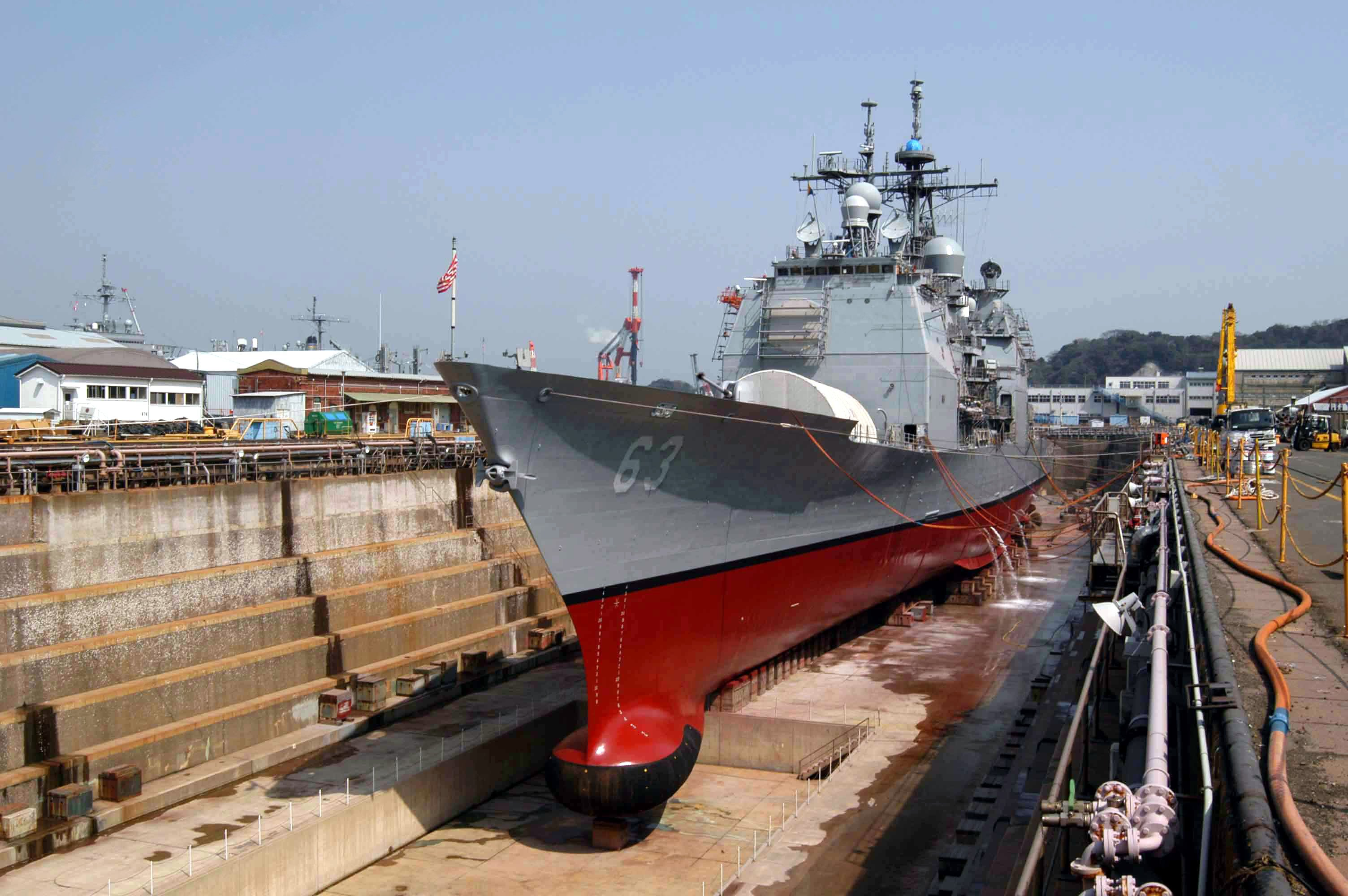
Cowpens in drydock in Yokosuka, 2004

This ship was one of several participating in disaster relief after the 2011 Tōhoku earthquake and tsunami.

In June 2010, a quartermaster fell to his death from the bridge wing of Cowpens while the ship was in dry dock.

=== 2010s ===
Cowpens was scheduled to be decommissioned on 31 March 2013. However, Cowpens was retained under the National Defense Authorization Act for Fiscal Year 2013. In February 2013, Cowpens was relieved by Antietam in a "hull-swap" at Yokosuka, Japan, in which the two crews swapped ships. Cowpens, previously deployed to Yokosuka, was then homeported at Naval Base San Diego, California. On 5 December 2013, Cowpens was involved in a minor confrontation with a Chinese warship that was escorting the Chinese aircraft carrier Liaoning while conducting surveillance of Chinese ships in International waters in the South China Sea. After Cowpens refused a Chinese demand to leave the area, a Chinese amphibious transport dock crossed directly in front of Cowpens and halted. The two vessels were barely 500 yards (460 m) away when the captain of Cowpens ordered "all stop". Chinese admiral Yin Zhuo said that the Chinese action was intentional and that American ships sent to observe PLAN maneuvers would be "blocked". Pentagon spokesman Steve Warren said that American procedures had not been changed in light of the incident, but defense analyst Tim Brown said that it reflected "a growing willingness by the Chinese to engage in potentially reckless behavior".

In September 2015, Cowpens transferred from Naval Surface Forces Command to Naval Sea Systems Command, where she will undergo a "modernization period", extending the serviceable life of the ship into the 2040s.

=== 2020s ===
In the US Navy's 2024 proposed budget, presented in 2023, Cowpens was again proposed for retirement. Navy Undersecretary Erik Raven stated that this was due to the ship's "material condition, life remaining, cost, ... time to upgrade ... and the warfighting value."

In March 2024, the Navy announced plans to inactivate Cowpens on 30 August 2024. She was decommissioned on 27 August 2024. On 30 August, 2024, Cowpens was stricken from the register.

== Command history ==
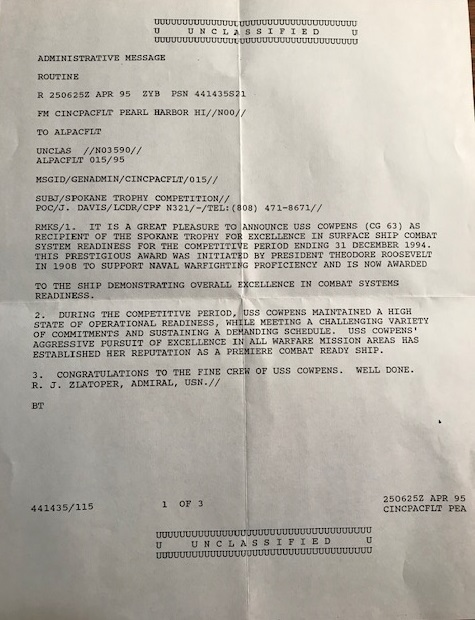
In 1994, Cowpens was awarded the coveted U.S. Pacific Fleet Spokane Trophy for the top operational combat systems readiness performance in the fleet for a surface ship.

Captain Edward Moore Jr. was the first commanding officer of Cowpens. Vice Admiral Moore later became Commander of Naval Surface Force, U.S. Pacific Fleet, from August 1998 to May 2001.

Captain W. Dallas Bethea was the second commanding officer of Cowpens. He relieved Captain Moore, who had just been promoted to rear admiral, on 2 February 1993 in Bahrain and was on board when the ship took part in the Tomahawk strike on 17 January. Captain Bethea often challenged other ships in the fleet to a 5-mile drag race and enjoyed an undefeated record. Captain Bethea previously commanded USS Gary (FFG 51) and played a significant role during Operation Praying Mantis, a punitive strike against Iran for damage done by an Iranian mine to USS Samuel B. Roberts (FFG-58). He is prominently mentioned in the book Tanker War, which chronicles this tense conflict between Iran and the United States. During Captain Bethea's last year in command in 1994, Cowpens was awarded the coveted U.S. Pacific Fleet Spokane Trophy (citation below) for the top operational combat systems readiness performance in the fleet for a surface ship, the Secretary of the Navy Meritorious Unit Commendation, as well as her second consecutive Pacific Fleet Surface Force Battle Efficiency Award in addition to the Pacific Fleet Surface Force LAMPS Helicopter Ship Safety Award.

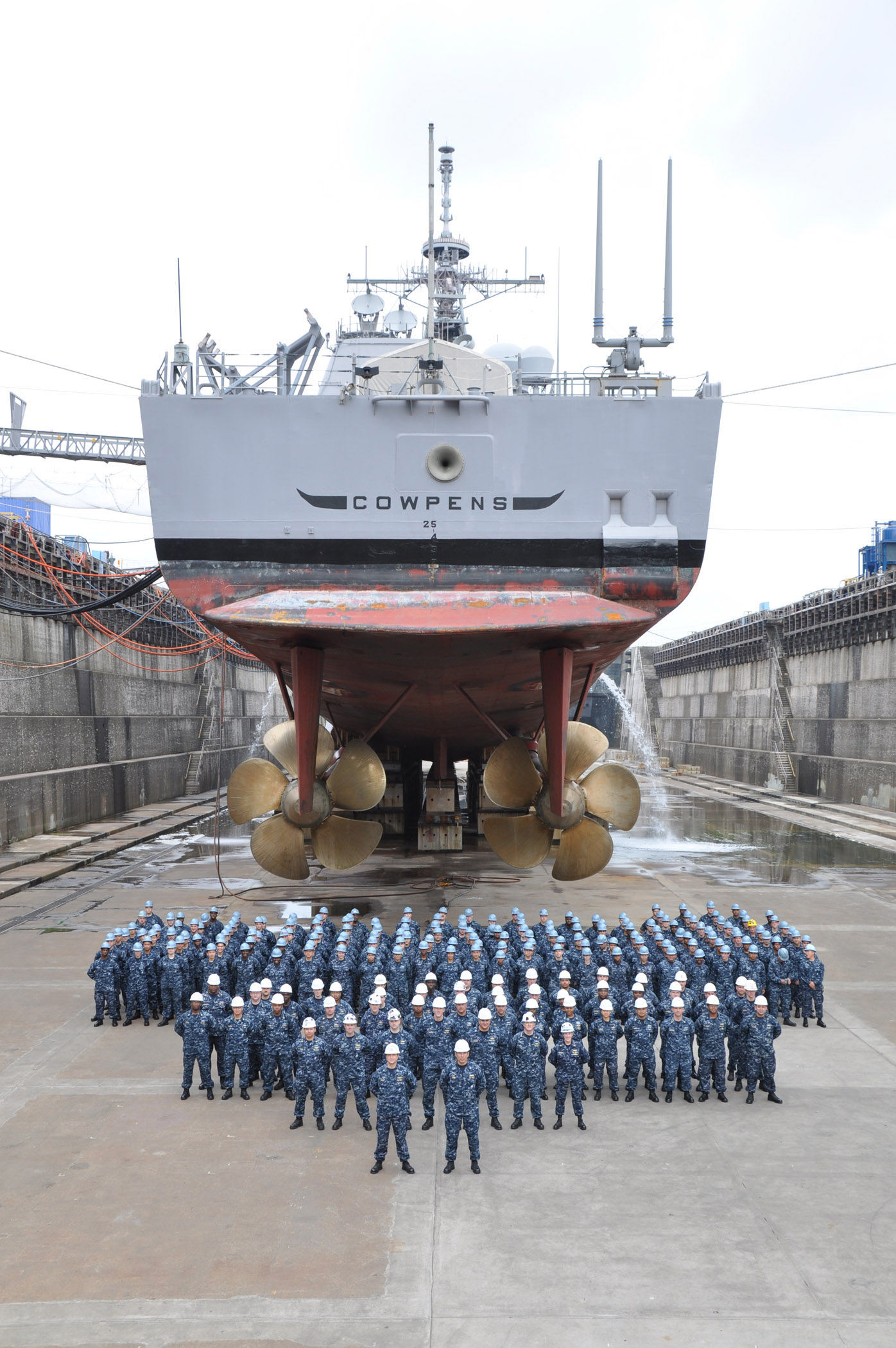
The officers and crew of the guided-missile cruiser Cowpens pose for a group photo under the ship, July 2010.

On 13 January 2010, the ship's commanding officer, Captain Holly Graf, was relieved of command by Rear Admiral Kevin Donegan, Commander, Carrier Strike Group Five, following the imposition of non-judicial punishment. The punishment followed an investigation which verified allegations of cruelty and maltreatment toward her crew and conduct unbecoming an officer – violations of articles 93 and 133 of the Uniform Code of Military Justice, by Graf during her tenure as captain of Cowpens. The investigation was initiated after multiple allegations and complaints of physical and verbal abuse were made to Naval Criminal Investigative Service and the Navy Inspector General by several members of the crew. Captain Graf was subsequently replaced as the commanding officer by Captain Robert Marin. A subsequent Time article revealed that Graf had a history of abusive treatment of subordinates in earlier command and non-command assignments and that naval leaders had not acted on previous complaints about her behavior. The US Navy forced Graf into early retirement in 2012, but allowed her to do so at her current rank of captain and under "honorable circumstances."

On 10 February 2012, Cowpens' commanding officer, Captain Robert G. Marin, was relieved of command for inappropriate personal behavior after he had an adulterous affair with a fellow captain's wife. Captain Paul Lyons, deputy commander Destroyer Squadron 15, temporarily assumed command.

On 10 June 2014, the commanding officer of Cowpens, Captain Gregory Gombert, was relieved of command for poor performance in many inspections. Capt. Robert B. Chadwick II temporarily assumed command on that date. Based on an official report, the Navy Times reported that Gombert took ill midway through the deployment and rarely left his quarters for nearly three months of the cruise. The report concluded Gombert had exaggerated the extent of his illness. It also noted accusations of an unduly familiar relationship between Gombert and a female Lieutenant Commander who was Chief Engineer, acting Executive Officer, and filling in for Gombert during his illness. The Command Master Chief was also relieved since he did not report the problems to higher authorities. At Admiral's non-judicial punishment in July 2014, Gombert was found guilty of five counts of failure to obey lawful orders and one count of conduct unbecoming an officer. The Chief Engineer was found guilty of two counts of failure to obey lawful orders and one of conduct unbecoming an officer. The Command Master Chief was found guilty of two counts of failure to obey lawful orders. Gombert was the third commanding officer of Cowpens to be fired since 2010.

In September 2014, Cowpens second-in-command, executive officer, was fired after being found guilty of Admiral's non-judicial punishment of drunken or reckless vehicle operation and conduct unbecoming an officer. He was the fourth member of Cowpens leadership team to be removed in 2014.

== Awards ==
According to the US Navy unit awards website, Cowpens and her crew received the following awards:

- Navy E Ribbon, for 1993, 1994, 1995, 1996, 1997, 1998 and 2011.
- Meritorious Unit Commendation, for service with the Kitty Hawk battle group, November 1992 to April 1993.
- Meritorious Unit Commendation, for service with the Kitty Hawk battle group, July to December 1994.
- Spokane Trophy as the top operational surface warship in the Pacific Fleet, 1994.
- Armed Forces Expeditionary Medal, for service in the Persian Gulf from January to February 1997.
- Meritorious Unit Commendation, for service with 5th Fleet and Task Force 50, August 1998.
- Meritorious Unit Commendation, for service with Carrier Group 5 in 2001.
- Humanitarian Service Medal, March to May 2011, during the time of the 2011 Tōhoku earthquake and tsunami.
