= De Graff =

De Graff may refer to:

== People ==
- Arthur C. DeGraff (1899–1983), American cardiologist
- Devaun DeGraff (born 1980), Bermudian footballer
- Geoffrey de Graff (born 1949), secular name of American monk Ṭhānissaro Bhikkhu
- Jeff DeGraff (born 1958), American professor, author, and consultant
- John I. De Graff (1783–1848), American politician
- Laurens de Graaf (1653–1704), Dutch pirate
- Lawrence De Graff (1871–1934), American judge
- Peter DeGraaf (born 1957), American politician
- Robert Fair de Graff (1895–1981), American publisher, founder of Pocket Books

== Places ==
In the United States:

- De Graff, Kansas, an unincorporated place in Butler County, Kansas
- De Graff, Minnesota, a city in Swift County, Minnesota, United States
- De Graff, Ohio, a village located in Logan County, Ohio, United States
