= Graf (disambiguation) =

Graf is a German comital title, which is part of many compound titles.

Graf may also refer to:

- Graf (surname)
- Graf, Iowa, an American city
- Graf Ignatievo, a Bulgarian village
  - Graf Ignatievo Air Base
- Graf, slang term for a paragraph
- GRAF1, a human protein

== See also ==
- Graf Zeppelin (disambiguation)
- Graff (disambiguation)
- Graph (disambiguation)
- Grof (disambiguation)
- Groff (disambiguation)
