= Graphic notation =

Graphic notation, graphical notation or "diagrammatic notation" may refer to:

- Graphic notation (music)
- Graphic notation (dance)
- A diagrammatic notation in mathematical notation
- In physics:
  - Penrose graphical notation
  - Coxeter–Dynkin diagram
- A visual programming language in computing

== See also ==
- Graphic (disambiguation)
