= Graft =

Graft, grafts or grafting may refer to:

- Graft (politics), a form of political corruption
- Graft, Netherlands, a village in the municipality of Graft-De Rijp

== Science and technology ==
- Graft (surgery), a surgical procedure
- Grafting, the joining of plant tissues
- Grafting (decision trees), in computer science, adding nodes to a decision tree

== Art and entertainment ==
- Graft (1915 serial), a film serial
- Graft (1931 film), featuring Boris Karloff
- Graft (Paine), a sculpture by Roxy Paine, National Gallery of Art Sculpture Garden, Washington, D.C.
- Graft (rapper), a British rapper
- Grafted (film), a 2024 horror film
- Grafts (album), 2017 album by Kara-Lis Coverdale

== Other uses ==
- Grafting (knitting), the joining of two knitted fabrics
- Graft (architects), an architecture firm

== See also ==
- Photografting, a technique used in the study of polymers
- Transplant (disambiguation), including some senses meaning a type of graft
- Cross-link, in some literature linking of chemicals to surface is named as grafting
