= Gref =

Gref is a German surname, derived from the noble title Graf. It also means "Grave" in the Frisian language. Notable people with the surname include:

- Herman Gref (born 1964), Russian politician and businessman
- Lynn G. Gref (born 1941), American technologist and systems engineer

== Other uses ==
- General Reserve Engineer Force, part of the Border Roads Organisation
