= De Greef =

De Greef (Dutch pronunciation: [də ˈɣreːf]) is a Dutch occupational surname. Greef is an archaic and/or regional spelling of Dutch graaf, meaning either the head of a municipal council (schepen) or a count. It may refer to:

De Greef

- Arnaud De Greef (born 1992), Belgian footballer
- Arthur De Greef (composer) (1862–1940), Belgian pianist and composer
- Arthur De Greef (tennis) (born 1992), Belgian tennis player
- Bastiaan de Greef (1818–1899), Dutch architect; city architect of Amsterdam from 1834 to 1890
- Elvire De Greef (1897–1991), Belgian woman who helped downed allied airmen during World War II escape Nazi capture.
- Eugène De Greef (1900–1995), Belgian politician and minister of defence
- Francis De Greef (born 1985), Belgian road cyclist
- Heleen Van Arkel-de Greef (born 1965), Dutch chess master
- Jan de Greef (1784–1834), Dutch architect; city architect of Amsterdam from 1820 to 1834
- Janine De Greef (1925–2020), Belgian teenager who helped downed allied airmen during World War II.
- Lien De Greef (born 1981), Belgian singer
- Lizzy de Greef (born 2004), Dutch wheelchair tennis player
- Peter De Greef (1922–1980), British actor
- Robbert de Greef (1991–2019), Dutch cyclist
- Walter De Greef (born 1957), Belgian footballer

De Greeff

- Thijs de Greeff (born 1982), Dutch field hockey player

== See also ==
- De Graaf
- De Graeff, old Dutch patrician family
