= Suenonius Mandelgreen =

Dutch book binder, translator, auctioneer and publisher (approx. 1710 – 1758)

- Born: Suenonius Mandelgreen approx. 1710; Uppsala, Sweden
- Died: 10 September 1756 (aged 46); Middelburg, Province of Zeeland, Dutch Republic
- Known for: Book binder; publisher, translator, auctioneer
- Movement: luxury book binding
- Spouse: Anna Catharina Smitsbergen

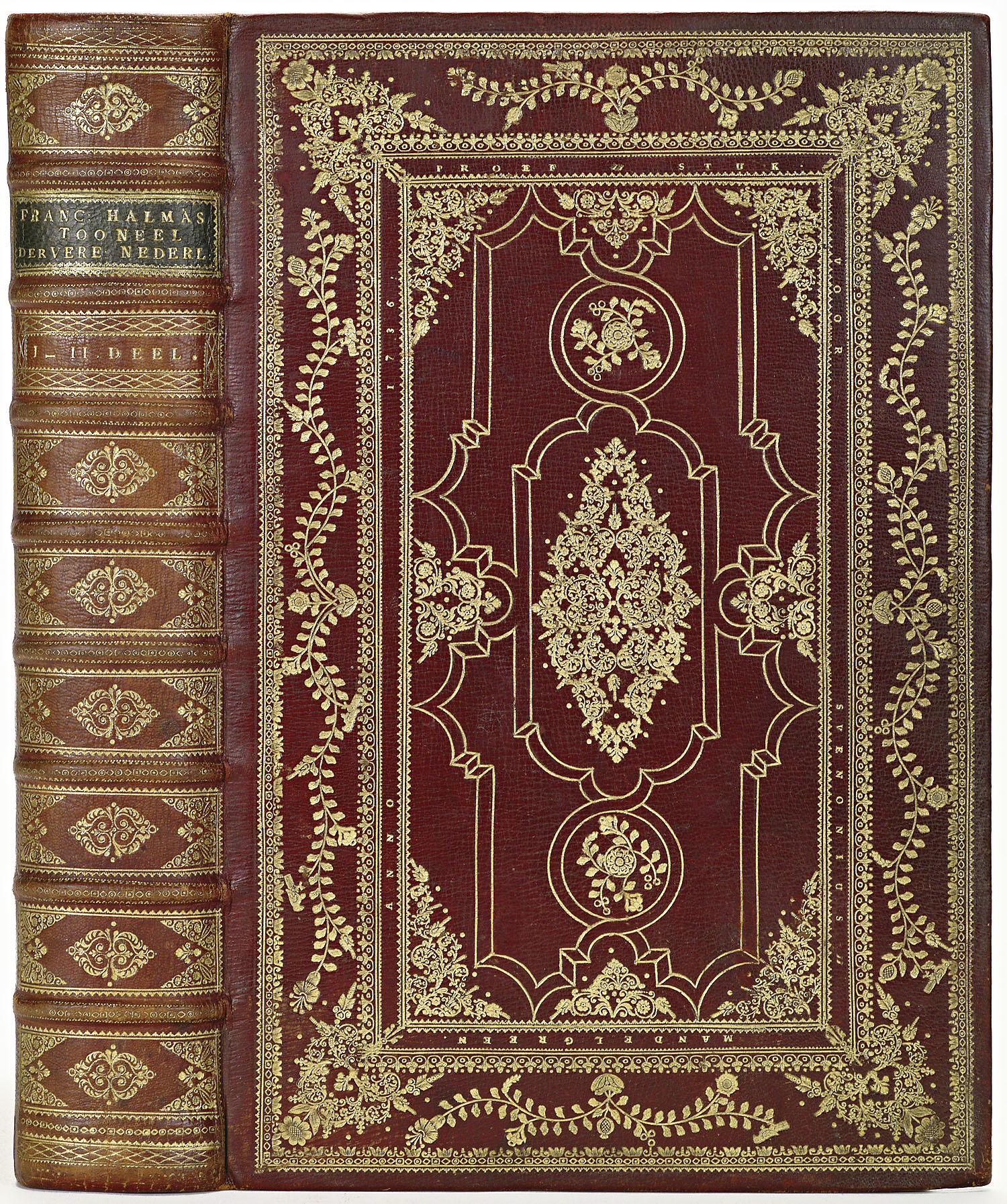
Bookbinding of dark brown-carmine morocco by Mandelgreen from 1736. The book block contains François Halma, Tooneel der Vereenigde Nederlanden ... (Leeuwarden, 1725). Source: Royal Library of the Netherlands (KB), bookshelf 1792 E 15

Suenonius Mandelgreen was one of the top Dutch eighteenth-century bookbinders and was also a publisher, translator and auctioneer.

== Bookbinder ==
Suenonius Mandelgreen was a bookbinder from Sweden. He was born in Uppsala and learned the trade of bookbinding in his native country, including stamping book covers in gold leaf. He then worked in Middelburg (Dutch Republic) from 1736 onwards, until his death in 1758. Until the eighteenth century, it was customary for a publisher to only publish the book block. People could choose a bookbinder to provide it with a (luxury) binding of their choice, as happened with the illustrated copy of the Van Borssele van de Hooge family. The book block of this work was printed by Pieter Gillissen in Middelburg.

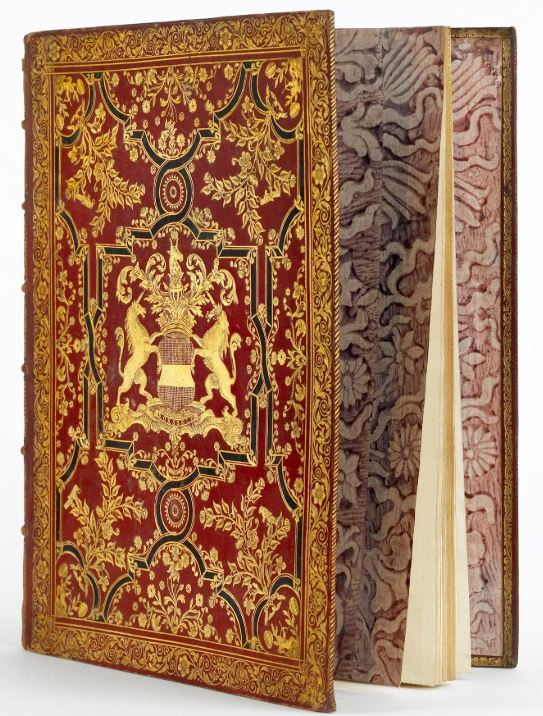
Book binding of red morocco stamped in gold leaf with a ribbon pattern, from 1755, by Suenonius Mandelgreen. The binding was made for the Van Borssele van der Hooge family (coat of arms in the center). Cupids shooting arrows at a flying heart are visible in the corners of the book cover. Source: Zeeuws Archief, blog by Roosanne Goudbeek about this luxurious bookbinding

A very special book binding by Mandelgreen is in the possession of the Royal Library of the Netherlands (KB). It is the binding Kern der Nederlandsche historie (Core of Dutch history), which is actually a cassette containing eleven miniature bindings, which are in turn located in a miniature bookcase with five shelves. Mandelgreen was one of the few bookbinders to sign his work. He did this on various bindings with the text Mandelgreen fecit. In addition to the KB (The Hague), the Royal Library of Belgium in Brussels, the Zeeuws Archief in Middelburg and the ZB (Middelburg), the British Library also owns book bindings by Mandelgreen. Mandelgreen probably found a successor to his knowledge in the Flushing pupil and later publisher and bookbinder Jan Dane. As a book binder, Mandelgreen is considered one of the best representatives of his time.

== Publisher, translator and auctioneer ==
In addition to being a book binder, Mandelgreen was also an auctioneer and publisher. He was mentioned in the city accounts as a printer in 1756 and 1757. From 1752 onwards he was the translator of Danish and Swedish for the city of Middelburg. Mandelgreen also published sheet music, such as the Symphony for string orchestra opus 1 by Christian Ernst Graf, as well as his Sei Sinfonie a violino primo, secondo, viola e basso. Furthermore, the publisher announced in the Middelburgsche Courant that Graf's "Trios, being VI sonatas on violons, vol. 2 é Basso" could be obtained. Although his activities as a publisher were secondary, Mandelgreen was one of the few music publishers that the 18th century Dutch Republic had to offer. His edition of Graf's Sei Sinfonie is of a surprisingly good quality.

== Middelburgsche Courant ==
In 1758, Mandelgreen, together with Adam Laurens Callenfels and Louis Taillefert Davidsz., started publishing the Middelburgsche Courant, the first copy of which appeared on 26 April of that year, making it the third oldest (still continuing) newspaper of the Netherlands. Four months later, Suenonius would pass away.

== Personal life ==
Suenonius Mandelgreen was married to Anna Catharina Smitsbergen and had at least two sons with her, Suenonius Christiaen and Isaak, and a daughter Cornelia Elizabeth. He lived with his family on the Market in the center of Middelburg.

== Literature ==
- Leeuwen, Jan Storm van. "Een Unieke Boekband Gemaakt door Suenoius [sic] Mandelgreen", in: Nehalennia 55 (1984) 3-19.
- Leeuwen, Jan Storm van en Ronald M. Rijkse, Goud en velijn. Middelburgse boekbanden van de 17de tot de 19de eeuw (Middelburg: Stichting Zeeuwse katernen, 1992).
- Zeeuws Archief, blog Luxe boekband uit de 18de eeuw, consulted January 20, 2025.
