= Graphic (disambiguation) =

Graphics are two-dimensional images.

Graphic(s) or The Graphic may also refer to:

== Computing ==
- Computer graphics, generating images using computers
- Video game graphics, displaying video game content

== Publications ==
- The Graphic (later The Daily Graphic and The National Graphic), London, UK (1869–1932)
- The Daily Graphic (New York, 1873–89)
- Daily Graphic (Ghana) (since 1950)
- New York Graphic (1924–32)
- The Newberg Graphic, Newberg, Oregon, United States (since 1888)
- Sunday Graphic, London, UK (1927–60)

== Places ==
- Graphic, Arkansas, unincorporated community in Crawford County, Arkansas, United States

== Other uses ==
- GRAPHICS
- Graphic (TV series), Canadian news program
- Graphics (album) by Joe McPhee
- Treva Spontaine and The Graphic, an American indie band

== See also ==
- Grafik (magazine), British art magazine
- Graphix, an imprint of Scholastic Corporation
- Graph (disambiguation)
