= Grof =

Grof, Gróf may refer to:

People:

- Attila Gróf (born 1964), a Hungarian footballer, father of Dávid
- Bela "Bert" Grof (1921–2011), an Australian forage researcher of Hungarian origin
- Gróf András István (1936–2016), a Hungarian-American businessman and scientist
- Dávid Gróf (born 1989), a Hungarian footballer
- Jonas Grof (born 1996), a German basketball player
- Ödön Gróf (1915–1997), a Hungarian swimmer who competed in the 1936 Summer Olympics
- Paul Grof, a psychiatrist and member of the World Health Organization committee that evaluated ecstasy
- Stanislav Grof, a Czech psychiatrist

Other:

- Grossflammenwerfer, a nickname for a German flamethrower of the First World War
- Betty Grof, a character who is Simon Petrikov's girlfriend in the TV series Adventure Time

== See also ==
- Groff (disambiguation)
- Graf (disambiguation)
- Graff (disambiguation)
