= Holly Graf =

Former US Navy officer

Holly Ann Graf
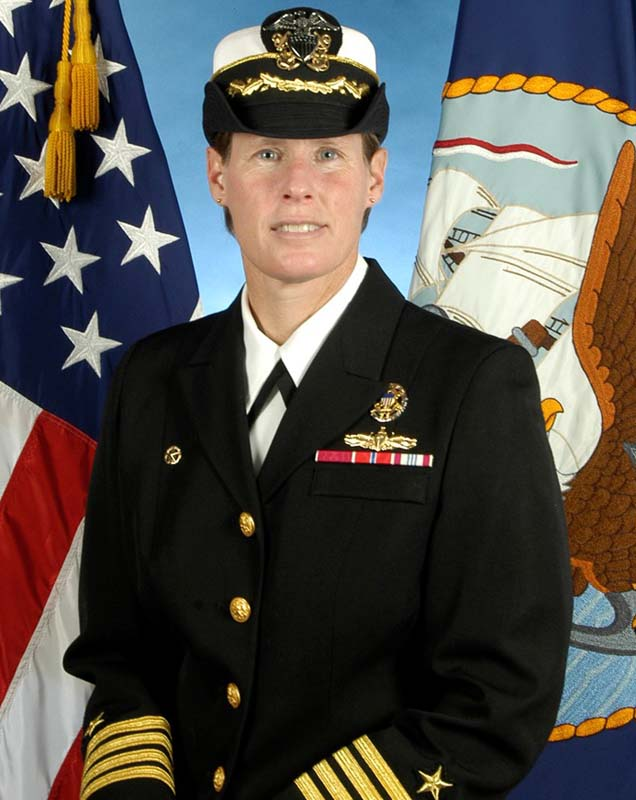
- Born: Simsbury, Connecticut, U.S.
- Military career
- Allegiance: United States
- Branch: United States Navy
- Service years: 1985–2010
- Rank: Captain
- Commands: USS Winston S. Churchill (DDG-81); USS Cowpens (CG-63)
- Conflicts: Operation Iraqi Freedom
- Awards: Legion of Merit; Bronze Star; Defense Meritorious Service Medal; Meritorious Service Medal (with one gold star).

Holly Ann Graf is a retired United States Navy officer. Until January 2010 she was commanding officer of the Ticonderoga-class guided missile cruiser USS Cowpens (CG-63), a major surface combatant vessel of the fleet. She was the first woman to command a cruiser in the history of the U.S. Navy. Earlier, she had been among the first women in the U.S. Navy to command a destroyer when she served as skipper of the guided missile destroyer USS Winston S. Churchill (DDG-81). Her personal decorations include the Legion of Merit and the Bronze Star, among others. Graf was relieved of command for abusive behavior unbecoming of an officer and was featured in Time magazine that characterized her as a modern-day female "Captain Bligh". The U.S. Navy forced Graf into early retirement in 2012, but allowed her to do so at her current rank of captain and under "honorable circumstances".

== Early life and education ==
Graf grew up in Simsbury, Connecticut, to a family with a long history of naval service. Her father is a retired captain and submarine officer in the U.S. Navy, and her sister, Robin L. Graf, is a retired one-star rear admiral in the Navy Reserve. Graf graduated from the United States Naval Academy in 1985. Most of her colleagues at the time believed she was well on her way to flag rank.

She holds a Master of Arts degree in National Security and Strategic Studies from the Naval War College and an additional Master's degree in civil engineering from Villanova University.

== Navy career ==
Graf's previous billets include Auxiliaries Officer and First Division Officer on the destroyer tender USS Puget Sound (AD-38), this due to combat restrictions in effect at the time (10 USC 6015) that precluded women from being eligible to serve on front-line combatant warships in the U.S. Navy. With the termination of this restriction in 1993 and the first women embarking on warships in 1994, Graf subsequently became the Weapons Officer aboard the frigate USS Ainsworth (FF-1090) and executive officer of the guided missile destroyer USS Curtis Wilbur (DDG-54). She was subsequently promoted to commander and served as commanding officer of the guided missile destroyer USS Winston S. Churchill (DDG-81) from 20 April 2002 to 6 February 2004. During this deployment, she participated in the opening stages of Operation Iraqi Freedom. She was promoted to captain in 2007. Graf then served as the assistant operations officer for the USS Carl Vinson (CVN-70) carrier strike group.

From 20 March 2008 to 13 January 2010, Graf was the commanding officer of the guided missile cruiser USS Cowpens (CG-63), based in Yokosuka, Japan.

=== Relieved of command ===
On 13 January 2010, Graf was relieved of command of USS Cowpens by Rear Admiral Kevin Donegan, commander of Carrier Strike Group Five, as non-judicial punishment stemming from an admiral's mast. The punishment followed an investigation which verified allegations of cruelty and maltreatment of her crew, and conduct unbecoming an officer. Graf was found to have violated articles 93 and 133 of the Uniform Code of Military Justice during her tenure as commanding officer of Cowpens. The investigation was initiated after multiple allegations and complaints of physical and verbal abuse were made to Naval Criminal Investigative Service and the Navy Inspector General by members of the crew. Graf was subsequently replaced as the ship's commanding officer by Captain Robert Marin.

The report found that Graf frequently abused members of her crew verbally and physically, creating what one crew member described as "an environment of fear and hostility". She was also faulted for neglecting her junior officers; the Navy has long considered training of junior officers to be one of the most important duties of a commanding officer. Graf initially blamed the complaints about her command style on a disgruntled group in the Cowpens wardroom. However, in a follow-up email, she admitted to raising her voice and cursing at times to show she meant business.

Subsequent reports by Time revealed that Graf had a history of abusive treatment of subordinates as far back as her tenure on the Curtis Wilbur. Previous complaints had not been acted upon by Navy leaders. Many who served with her thought she was the closest thing they'd seen to an actual Captain Bligh. For instance, while she was commander of the Churchill, a propeller snapped just as it was leaving port, leaving it dead in the water. Graf grabbed the navigator and dragged him to the outdoor bridge wing while cursing at him. According to chaplain Maurice Kaprow, many Churchill sailors, knowing that Graf's career would have ended if the Churchill had run aground, started jumping for joy and singing "Ding-Dong! The Witch Is Dead" on the fantail. Kaprow later said that the crew's morale was the lowest he'd ever seen in his 20-year naval career. The Churchill's gunnery officer said that Graf frequently spat at other officers and threw things at them, including ceramic coffee cups and binders. Ultimately, the entire crew broke out in cheers when she changed command in 2004.

=== Later career ===
Graf was slated to take a job at the Office of Information, Plans and Strategy (N3/N5) at the Pentagon after leaving the Cowpens. However, after losing her command, Graf was reassigned to the Naval Surface Warfare Center's laboratory in Dahlgren, Virginia.

A board of inquiry composed of three admirals held hearings regarding her conduct in November 2010. On 3 December 2010, the board of inquiry recommended that Graf be separated from the Navy and receive a retirement under general circumstances so she could be allowed to retire with the rank of captain. General discharges (or a "General" characterization to retiring commissioned officers) are given to service members whose performance is satisfactory but is marked by a considerable departure in the performance and conduct standards expected of military members. On 6 January 2012, this decision was reversed and Graf was allowed to receive an honorable service characterization as a retired officer, as it was, "...determined that her conduct did not rise to a level sufficient to warrant the characterization of her service as less than honorable".

== Military awards ==
Graf's awards include:

Command at Sea insignia	Office of the Joint Chiefs of Staff Identification Badge		
Command at Sea insignia	Surface Warfare insignia		
Command at Sea insignia	Legion of Merit	Bronze Star	Defense Meritorious Service Medal
