= Grafs =

Grafs of GRAFS may refer to:

- GRAFS, human gene family

People

- Raitis Grafs (born 1981), Latvian basketball player
- Gunnar Graps-Grāfs (1951–2004), Estonian musician

== See also ==
- Graf (disambiguation)
