= John W. Anderson (Iowa judge) =

American judge (1871–1954)

John Anderson

Chief Justice of the Iowa Supreme Court
- In office January 2, 1935 – June 1935
- Preceded by: Richard F. Mitchell

Associate Justice of the Iowa Supreme Court
- In office January 1, 1933 – December 31, 1938
- Preceded by: Lawrence De Graff
- Succeeded by: William L. Bliss

Judge of Iowa's 4th Judicial District
- In office 1914–1920

Monona County Attorney
- In office 1908–1912

Personal details
- Born: July 21, 1871 Buchanan County, Iowa
- Died: January 29, 1954 (aged 82) Sioux City, Iowa
- Spouse: Mary Agnes Peck
- Children: 2

John W. Anderson (July 21, 1871 – January 29, 1954) was a justice of the Iowa Supreme Court from January 1, 1933, to December 31, 1938, appointed from Woodbury County, Iowa.

== Life ==
He was born in Buchanan County, Iowa on July 21, 1871.

He attended Upper Iowa University in Fayette, Iowa and was admitted to the bar in 1893. He was County Attorney of Monona County for two terms from 1908 to 1912 and then in 1914 he became Judge of the 4th Judicial District Court where he continued to serve until he resigned in 1920.

From 1920 to 1933 he returned to practicing law at Sioux City. He served on the State Supreme Court for 6 years from 1933 to 1938. He was Chief Justice from January 1935 to June 1935.

He had two children. He married Mary Agnes Peck on April 15, 1933, in Council Bluffs, Iowa. He died in Sioux City in 1954.

Political offices
Preceded by Lawrence De Graff	Justice of the Iowa Supreme Court; 1933–1938	Succeeded by William L. Bliss
