= Transplant =

Transplant or Transplantation may refer to:

== Sciences ==
- Transplanting a plant from one location to another
- Organ transplantation, moving an organ from one body to another
- Transplant thought experiment, an experiment similar to Trolley problem
- Transplant experiment, where an organism is moved from one location to another
- Ectopic endometrial implantation as part of the theory of retrograde menstruation in endometriosis
- Transplantation (journal)

== Art and entertainment ==
- Transplants (band), an American band
  - Transplants (album), 2002
- Transplant, a 1987 novel by Frank G. Slaughter
- Transplant, a 2003 novel by Malcolm Rose
- Transplant (TV series), a Canadian television series premiering in February 2020

=== Television episodes ===
- "Transplant", America Undercover episode 19 (1988)
- "Transplant" (House), 2011
- "Transplant", Judd, for the Defense season 2, episode 2 (1968)
- "Transplant", So Weird season 2, episode 25 (2000)
- "Transplant" (The Golden Girls), 1985
- "Transplant", The Net (American) episode 3 (1998)
- "The Transplant", Courage the Cowardly Dog season 2, episode 9b (2001)
- "The Transplant", Hanazuki: Full of Treasures season 1, episode 26 (2017)

== See also ==
- Graft (disambiguation), including some senses meaning a type of transplant
