= Groff =

Groff may refer to:

- Groff (surname)
- groff (software), a typesetting computer program
- Groff (lychee), a variety of lychee fruit tree
- Groff v. DeJoy, a United States Supreme Court case regarding religious liberty decided as part of the 2022 term

== See also ==
- Graf (disambiguation)
- Graff (disambiguation)
- Grof (disambiguation)
