= Graff =

Graff may refer to:

- Graff (lunar crater)
- Graff (Martian crater)
- Graff (jewellers), jewelry boutique specializing in rare diamonds
  - 2009 Graff Diamonds robbery, which took place at the above store
- Graff, Minnesota an unincorporated community in Moose Lake Township, Cass County, Minnesota, United States
- Graff, Missouri, an unincorporated community in eastern Wright County, Missouri, United States

== People with the surname ==
- Anton Graff (1736–1813), German painter
- Ester Graff (1897–1991), Danish businesswoman and feminist
- Frederick Graff (1775–1847), American hydraulic engineer
- Garrett M. Graff (born 1981), American journalist and author
- Gerald Graff (born 1937), American professor
- Henry Graff (1921–2020), American historian and writer
- Ilene Graff (born 1949), American actress
- Jens Graff (born 1942), German-born Norwegian dancer
- Johann Michael Graff, German Rococo sculptor and plasterer
- Kasimir Graff (1878–1950), German astronomer
- Laurence Graff, English jeweller
- Ludwig von Graff (1851–1924), Hungarian-Austrian zoologist
- Michael Graff, American computer engineer
- Patricio Graff (born 1975), Argentine footballer
- Randy Graff (born 1955), American actress
- Suzanne Graff, American actress
- Todd Graff (born 1959), American actor
- Wilton Graff (1903–1969), American actor

== Fictional ==
- Hyrum Graff, a character in Orson Scott Card's Ender books

== See also ==
- De Graff (disambiguation)
- Graf (disambiguation)
- Graph (disambiguation)
- Grof (disambiguation)
- Groff (disambiguation)
