= Lynn G. Gref =

American technologist

Lynn Gref (born 1941) is an American technologist and systems engineer, who has done pioneering work in missile systems; command, control and communications (C3) systems; and satellite systems. He and Dr. William Spuck developed the Rapid Development Methodology (RDM) that was employed in the development of a number of C3 systems for the U.S. Department of Defense. RDM is a form of software development classified as iterative and incremental development. A primary distinction of RDM is that the user is left with a usable capability at the end of every iteration. He pioneered the development of C3 systems using the Ada programming language. He has coauthored a number of reports as a member the Army Science Board (ASB) and as a committee member for the Naval Studies Board of the United States National Academy of Sciences.

== Early life and education ==
Gref was born in Salt Lake City and achieved his Eagle Scout as a Boy Scout.

Lynn Gref received all his college degrees in mathematics from the University of California, Riverside (BA ‘63, MA ‘64, and PhD ‘66).

== Early career ==
Dr. Gref began his professional career at the University of Missouri in Columbia, Missouri. Subsequently, he joined the Applied Mathematics Department of the Aerospace Corporation where he focused on computer-based modeling and simulation. He was the deputy manager for Systems Analysis and Costing when he left Aerospace to join R & D Associates where he continued to work in the areas of modeling, simulation, and systems analysis. An important accomplishment was providing landmark recommendations on the disposition of the ARPANET that eventually led to the Internet as lead investigator of the effort for the Director of DARPA (Defense Advanced Research Projects Agency). Eventually, Gref became involved in the design and implementation of advanced information systems applied to command and control systems for the Department of Defense.

== Career at Jet Propulsion Laboratory ==
He next joined the Jet Propulsion Laboratory (JPL) as Manager of Information Systems where he continued to be involved with the design and implementation of advanced information systems. It was at JPL where he developed the Rapid Development Methodology with Dr. Spuck. While at JPL he served on the U.S. Army's Science Board and supported several study committees of the National Academy of Sciences’ Naval Studies Board. Although he retired from JPL as Manager of JPL's non-NASA government business, he continues today on a part-time relationship.

== Other professional activities ==
Currently he serves on the Board of Advisors of the College of Natural and Agricultural Sciences, University of California, Riverside and is a trustee of the UC Riverside Foundation. He is the author of “The Rise and Fall of American Technology” published by Algora Publishing. His book has shown extreme success, which increased his desire to advocate for technology awareness and science, technology, engineering and mathematics (STEM) education.
