= Andreas Christoph Graf =

German teacher, poet and writer

Andreas Christoph Graf (1701 in Augsburg – 1776 in Augsburg) was a German teacher, poet and writer of the etiquette book "The polite student" "Der höfliche Schüler" (1745).

== Life ==
Magister Andreas Christoph Graf was a teacher at the Gymnasium St. Anna, he retired in 1770. His book -in contrast to Knigge's On dealing with people "Über den Umgang mit Menschen" - is a conduct book with a collection of amusing verses in order to teach obstreperous pupils good behaviour and politeness "Höflichkeit". He wrote and published also tributes, such as for the wedding of Balthasar Christoph von Hößlin - the later Consul of Venice -, or obituaries e.g. to the funeral of Marx Christoph Welser.
