= Ulysses Grant Groff =

Ulysses Grant Groff (29 October 1865 – 15 October 1950) was an American landowner and philanthropist noted for substantial donations to the City of Amherst, Massachusetts and to Amherst College.

He was born in Lancaster County, Pennsylvania to plantation owner John Groff and Susan Beaver (née de Bouvoir) and married Julia Page Quick, the daughter of the Anglican Bishop of Philadelphia in Germantown, Pennsylvania on 14 March 1888.

In 1890, during a period of strong industrial growth, he relocated to Amherst, in order to develop what was at the time a large-scale farming enterprise. Despite the Great Depression, his enterprise fared exceptionally well compared with others, and he soon became a major landowner in Amherst. Upon reaching retirement age, he downscaled his holdings and donated large portions to the Town of Amherst and to Amherst College.

Groff died in an automobile accident in Massachusetts at age 84.

He was the father of real estate developer and businessman Charles Wister Groff.
