= Christian Ernst Graf =

Dutch Kapellmeister and composer

Christian Ernst Friedrich Graf (Rudolstadt, 30 June 1723 – The Hague, 17 July 1804) was a Dutch Kapellmeister and composer of German descent. He was Kapellmeister to William V, Prince of Orange and resident in the Netherlands from 1762, where he changed the spelling of his name to Graaf. A part of his sheet music was published by Suenonius Mandelgreen.

He was the son of Kapellmeister de:Johann Graf (1684–1750) and brother of the flautist Friedrich Hartmann Graf. He composed multiple symphonies as well as concertos and songs.

== Works ==
- Op. 1 Sinfonia voor Orkest in C (Symphony for Orchestra in C)
- Symphony No. 1 in F major
- Symphony in D
- Cello Concerto No. 1 in D major for cello and orchestra (1777)
- Laat ons juichen, Batavieren! for tenor and harpsichord (1766)
- De pruimeboom (Jantje zag eens pruimen hangen) for baritone and harpsichord, poem by Hieronymus van Alphen
