= Lawrence De Graff =

American judge (1871–1934)

James Day

Justice of the Iowa Supreme Court
- In office January 1, 1921 – December 31, 1932

Personal details
- Born: June 24, 1871 Apple River, Illinois
- Died: June 7, 1934 (aged 62)

Lawrence De Graff (June 24, 1871 – June 7, 1934) was a justice of the Iowa Supreme Court from January 1, 1921, to December 31, 1932, appointed from Polk County, Iowa.

De Graff was born in Apple River, Illinois. After graduating from the University of Chicago, he began practicing law in Illinois in 1896, and moved to Iowa in 1898. From 1904 to 1907, he served as first assistant to the Attorney General of Iowa; from 1907 to 1910, he was prosecuting attorney for Polk County from 1907 to 1910; and from 1910 to 1921, he was district judge for the 9th Judicial district of Iowa.

Political offices
Preceded by	Justice of the Iowa Supreme Court; 1921–1932	Succeeded by John W. Anderson
