= Graphic, Arkansas =

Unincorporated community in Arkansas, US

Coordinates: 35°34′24″N 94°08′37″W

Graphic is an unincorporated community in Crawford County, Arkansas, in the United States.

Graphic was founded in the 1880s.
