= Jan de Graaff =

Dutch journalist (1943–2014)

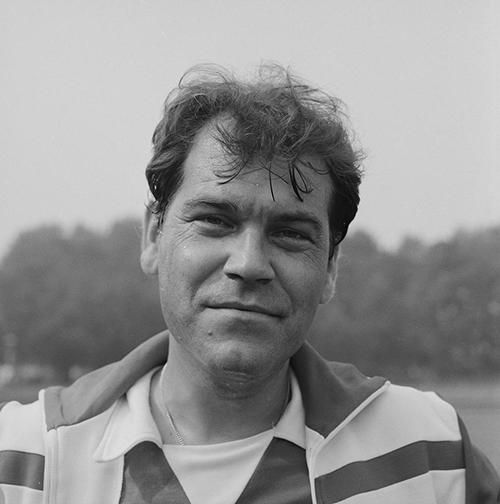
Jan de Graaff in August 1981

Jan de Graaff (21 April 1943 – 30 March 2014) was a Dutch television journalist. He started his job in 1962 for the news agency UPI, from 1966 he worked for VARA on radio and television, including as editor of Behind the News. He was born in The Hague, South Holland.

Jan de Graaff died on 30 March 2014 in Tilburg, North Brabant at the age of 70.
