= Jürgen-Peter Graf =

German judge

Dr. Jürgen-Peter Graf (born 22 December 1952 in Oberkirch, Baden) is a German lawyer. He became judge of the German Federal Court of Justice (Bundesgerichtshof) on 5 February 2003.

Graf studied law in Freiburg/Breisgau and passed his first legal state examination at the University of Freiburg in 1977, and the second in 1979. From 1980 to 1982, he was assistant lecturer at the University of Freiburg. In 1983, he became a judge in Baden-Wuerttemberg/Germany, then a public-prosecutor and then a judge again. From 1988 to 2003, he was one of the federal prosecutors at the German Generalbundesanwalt in Karlsruhe, and in 1994, he became a senior federal prosecutor at the office of the Generalbundesanwalt. In 2003, he was appointed Judge at the Federal Supreme Court of Justice in Karlsruhe.

His special interests are the matter of criminal offences on the Internet, new types of crime on the internet like phishing and pharming, the responsibility of Internet providers and the monitoring of telecommunications.
