= Jeff DeGraff =

American consultant and businessperson

Jeffrey DeGraff
- Born: Jeffrey Thomas DeGraff; 1958 (age 67–68); Kalamazoo, Michigan
- Education: Western Michigan University (B.S.); University of Michigan (M.A.); University of Wisconsin–Madison (PhD)
- Occupations: Academic, author, speaker, consultant
- Years active: 1985–present
- Employer: University of Michigan Ross School of Business
- Organization(s): Innovatrium Institute for Innovation; Intellectual Edge Alliance
- Known for: Competing values framework, innovation consulting
- Notable work: Innovation You (2011); The Innovation Code (2017); The Creative Mindset (2020); The Art of Change (2025)
- Television: Innovation You (PBS, 2011)
- Title: Clinical Professor of Management and Organizations
- Spouse: Staney DeGraff
- Website: jeffdegraff.com

Jeffrey Thomas DeGraff (born 1958) is an American academic, author, speaker, and consultant specializing in organizational innovation and creativity. He is a Clinical Professor of Management and Organizations at the University of Michigan's Ross School of Business and the founder of Innovatrium, an innovation consulting firm.

== Early life and education ==
DeGraff was born and raised in Kalamazoo, Michigan. He earned a B.S. in communication arts and sciences from Western Michigan University in 1980, an M.A. in communication and information studies from the University of Michigan in 1982, and a PhD in educational technology from the University of Wisconsin–Madison in 1985.

== Career ==
=== Early career ===
After completing his doctorate, DeGraff joined Domino's Pizza as vice president of communications and new ventures, where he served from 1985 to 1990. During his tenure, he helped drive the company's rapid expansion and earned the nickname "Dean of Innovation" for his creative approach to business growth. DeGraff also served on an advisory board for Apple Inc.

=== Academic career ===
In 1990, DeGraff transitioned to academia, joining the University of Michigan's Ross School of Business faculty. As a Clinical Professor of Management and Organizations, he teaches courses on creativity, innovation, and changing leadership, employing unconventional methods, such as holding classes in museums and public spaces to stimulate creative thinking. He is credited as the creator of the Certified Professional Innovator Program at the University of Michigan.

=== Media ===
DeGraff has been active in media and public outreach. He hosted a national PBS television program called Innovation You in 2011, which introduced his four-step innovation method to the public. He also contributed a segment titled The Next Idea on Michigan Public (NPR), where he analyzed emerging ideas and their role in addressing societal challenges.

=== Consulting ===
Beyond academia, DeGraff has worked as an innovation consultant. In 2006, DeGraff founded the Innovatrium Institute for Innovation, an innovation laboratory and consulting incubator with offices in Ann Arbor, Michigan, and Atlanta, Georgia. The Innovatrium operates as an "innovation laboratory" where he works with organizations to cultivate innovation culture.

DeGraff has served as an advisor to high-ranking government and military officials, including the Chief of Staff of the United States Air Force. His work includes developing innovation strategies to enhance adaptability and resilience within the military and government sectors.

=== Competing Values Framework ===
DeGraff co-developed the Competing Values Framework (CVF), a widely used model for organizational effectiveness and innovation. This framework is used by businesses, government agencies, and educational institutions to balance competing priorities and drive innovation.

=== Intellectual Edge Alliance ===
DeGraff is the founder of the Intellectual Edge Alliance (IEA), a non-profit organization dedicated to fostering scalable innovation capabilities within mission-driven organizations, including military and educational institutions.

== Writing ==
DeGraff has written regular columns on innovation for business publications such as Inc., Fortune, Wired, and Psychology Today, in which he shares practical insights into creativity and change. He and his wife, Staney DeGraff, have co-authored several books on innovation and creativity, including:

- The Innovation Code: The Creative Power of Constructive Conflict (2017)
- The Creative Mindset: Mastering the Six Skills That Empower Innovation (2020)
- The Art of Change: Transforming Paradoxes into Breakthroughs (2025)

DeGraff also authored:

- Innovation You: Four Steps to Becoming New and Improved (2011)
