= Jake Graf =

English actor, screenwriter, director, and activist

- Education: London School of Dramatic Art
- Occupations: Actor; screenwriter; director; transgender rights activist
- Years active: 2011–present
- Website: www.jakegraf.com

Jake Graf is an English actor, screenwriter, director, and transgender rights activist. Graf specialises in short films dealing with transgender issues in an effort to normalise queer and trans experiences to a wider, more mainstream audience. Many of Graf's films emphasise the daily lived experiences of trans men.

== Early life ==
From the age of two, Graf knew that he was different from other kids. As a young child, he was very vocal about his feelings and tried telling anyone who would listen that he was a boy. Graf spent much of his youth "trying my best just to 'pass' as male". He has repeatedly talked about the importance of LGBTQ+ representation in the media. Graf believed he "was the only person in the world that felt like he did" and did not know trans men existed until he was nearly 16. This lack of representation that he experienced as a young person made him feel "lonely and isolated". He decided to start transitioning in 2008 at the age of 28. With the emotional and financial support of his mother, Graf started hormone treatment.

== Career ==
Graf's first work within the industry was a screenplay dealing with his experiences as a trans man in making a female-to-male transition. In 2015 Graf visited the White House to take part in a Q&A and viewing of the film The Danish Girl with U.S. president Barack Obama. That year, he became the first trans man to appear on the cover of QX magazine and, in the following year, was featured on the covers of GNI, LGBT Weekly, and FTM Magazine. In 2015 Graf was one of 101 people nominated for a Rainbow Award, which recognises prominent LGBT+ people in Britain. The nomination acknowledges Graf's work in raising awareness of trans and queer issues through film. Alongside nominations for his work, Graf has been included in judge positions for festivals and award ceremonies. In 2019 he took a chair in the Iris Prize Jury, an LGBTQ+ film festival. Three years later, Graf also became a judge in the 2022 National Diversity Awards.

== Personal life ==
Graf is married to Hannah Winterbourne. The couple went on a date on 30 December 2015 after being introduced by a mutual friend. After three years of dating and receiving Winterbourne's father's blessing, Graf proposed in New York in September 2017. Their wedding took place on 23 March 2018 at Chelsea Old Town Hall in London. Approximately six years after starting transitioning, Graf decided to have his eggs frozen so that he would have the opportunity to have children in the future. In April 2020, their daughter was born via surrogate. Two years later, the couple announced the birth of their second child in June 2022. The 2020 documentary Our Baby: A Modern Miracle on Channel 4 covered their experience as transgender parents. Coronet Books published a memoir by the couple, titled Becoming Us, in 2023.

== Filmography ==
=== Film ===
Year	Title	Role	Notes	Ref.
2011	X-WHY	Sam	Short film; also director and producer Shown at 2012 BFI London Film Festival; Shortlisted for 2012 Iris Prize	
2012	Cocktale	Brian	Also writer and director Short Film Iris Prize Nominee 2012	
2015	Brace	Adam	Short film; also writer	
2015	The Danish Girl	Henri		
2015	Chance	Yob in Park	Short film; also director and producer	
2016	Dawn	—N/a	Short film; writer and director	
2017	Dusk	—N/a	Short film; writer and director	
2017	Headspace	—N/a	Short film; writer and director	
2018	Colette	Gaston Arman de Caillavet		

=== Television ===
Year	Title	Role	Notes	Network	Ref.
2017	Spectrum London	James Roche	8 episodes	Web series	
2017	Different for Girls	Claude	Episode: "Mythical Amazon"		
2018	Butterfly	James	Episode #1.2		
2021	Doctors	Olly Brockhurst	Episode: "Deadname"	BBC One	
2022	McDonald & Dodds	Pathologist	Episode: "Belvedere"	BritBox	

== Awards and nominations ==
Year	Association	Category	Work	Result	Ref.
2015	Outflix Film Festival	Best Foreign Short	Chance	Won	
2016	Outflix Film Festival	Best Foreign Short	Dawn	Won	
2016	Oxford Film Festival, Mississippi, USA	Best LBGTQ Film	Chance	Nominated	
2016	SENE Film, Music and Art Festival	Best LGBT Short	Chance	Won	
2016	Stamped Pensacola LGBT Film Festival	Best Short Film	Boys on Film: Time & Tied	Won	
2017	Changing Face International Film Festival	Best Short Drama	Dusk	Won	
2017	El Lugar Sin Limites	Best Short Film	Dusk	Won	
2017	FilmOut San Diego	Best International Short Film	Dusk	Won	
2017	Glitter Awards	Best Short Film	Dusk	Won	
2017	Indianapolis LGBT Film Festival	Best of Festival	Dusk	Won	
2017	Louisville LGBT Film Festival	Short Film	Dusk	Won	
2017	Macon Film Festival	Best LGBT Short	Dusk	Won	
2017	Miami Gay and Lesbian Film Festival	Best Short	Dusk	Won	
2017	North Carolina Gay and Lesbian Film Festival	Best Trans International Short	Dusk	Won	
2017	Out & Loud - Pune International Queer Film Festival	Best Short Film	Dusk	Won	
2017	OUT at the Movies Int'l LGBT Film Fest	Best Short Film	Dusk	Won	
2017	Out Here Now: the Kansas City LGBT Film Festival	Best Dramatic Short	Dusk	Won	
2017	Outflix Film Festival	Best Foreign Short	Dusk	Won	
2017	SENE Film, Music and Art Festival	Best LGBT Short	Dusk	Won	
2017	SENE Film, Music and Art Festival	LGBT Short	Dusk	Won	
2017	Shropshire Rainbow Film Festival	Best British Short Film	Dusk	Won	
2017	Translations: The Seattle Transgender Film Festival	Best Narrative Short	Dusk	Won	

== See also ==
- List of transgender film and television directors
