= Anton P. de Graaff =

Dutch writer (1928–2008)

- Born: Anthonie Peter de Graaff; 12 April 1928; Amsterdam, Netherlands
- Died: 4 January 2008 (aged 79); Waalwijk, Netherlands
- Occupation: Writer

Anthonie Peter de Graaff (Amsterdam, 12 April 1928 – Waalwijk, 4 January 2008) was a Dutch writer.

The author, who himself served in the Dutch East Indies from March 1949 to the beginning of October 1950 as sergeant combat medic of the 425th Infantry Battalion, had written twenty books about the issues faced by the soldiers (mainly conscripts) who were sent to the East Indies during the politionele acties in the wake of World War II.

De Graaff's best known work is the book De heren worden bedankt, with a total of seven editions. With his books, De Graaff had become a mouthpiece for many Dutch veterans of the Indonesian War of Independence and he exposed abuses that happened to Dutch soldiers during and after the conflict.

In 1995, a reconciliation trip by De Graaff to Indonesia, which also involved talks with former enemies, led to commotion among his veteran audience.

In 2000, De Graaff was knighted in the Order of Orange-Nassau. In 2007 he was awarded the Kolonel J.L.H.A. Antoni Waardering by the Ministry of Defense for his books.

De Graaff died on 4 January 2008 of a cerebral infarction, aged 79. His 19th book (Eindelijk erkenning) was published in the spring of 2008. De Graaff's 20th and last book, of which he had written 56 pages at the time of his death, was published posthumously in January 2009. Its title is Vaarwel, kameraad!

== Published works ==
- De heren worden bedankt: met het vergeten leger in Indië, 1949–1950. 1986. ISBN 9061354102
- De weg terug: het vergeten leger toen en nu. 1988. ISBN 9051940033
- Brieven uit het veld: het vergeten leger thuis. 1989. ISBN 9051940300
- De heren worden bedankt; De weg terug; Brieven uit het veld. 1990. ISBN 9051940424 (a hardcover bundle of De Graaff's first three books)
- Met de T.N.I. op stap: de laatste patrouille van het vergeten leger. 1991. ISBN 9051940653
- Notities van een soldaat: het dagboek van soldaat A.A. van der Heiden. 1994. ISBN 905194117X
- Zeg, Hollands soldaat… 1995. ISBN 9051941374
- Merdeka. 1995. ISBN 9051941498
- Vertel het je kinderen, veteraan! 1999. ISBN 9051941935
- Levenslang op patrouille. 2000. ISBN 9051942028
- De laatste patrouille. 2001. ISBN 9051942168
- Op patrouille in blessuretijd. 2001. ISBN 9051942362
- Indië-veteraan ben je levenslang. 2002. ISBN 9051942559
- Indië blijft ons bezighouden. 2003. ISBN 9051942664
- Indië vergeet je nooit! 2004. ISBN 9051942699
- Indië bepaalde ons leven. 2004. ISBN 9051942710
- Indonesië als eindstation. 2005. ISBN 9051942761
- Leven in twee werelden. 2007. ISBN 9051942990
- Indië blijft onze denkwereld. 2007. ISBN 9051943016
- Eindelijk erkenning. 2008. ISBN 905194330X
- Vaarwel, kameraad! 2009. ISBN 9051943407
