= De Graaff Brothers =

The de Graaff brothers (De Gebroeders de Graaff, Gebr. de Graaff) were a Dutch horticultural family company based in Lisse, Netherlands, in an area known as Duin- en Bollenstreek (Dune and Bulb Region), the centre of the Dutch bulb and floriculture industry.

== History ==
The family business was founded by Cornelis de Graaff in 1723. They became notable in the nineteenth century when Jan de Graaff and his two sons developed the Reginae strain of hybrids of Hippeastrum by crossing Hippeastrum vitatum and Hippeastrum striatum with Hippeastrum psittacinum and some of the better hybrids available in Europe at the time. Some of the most successful hybrids were Graveana and Empress of India.

In the twentieth century the business was continued in the United States in the de Graaf nursery in Oregon (Oregon Bulb Farms 1928) by another Jan de Graaff (1903–1989), who became known as an international expert on Lilies.

== Awards ==
The brothers were awarded a First Class Certificate by the Dutch Horticultural Society for their development of Hippeastrum 'Koningen Wilhelmina', inter alia in 1891.
