= Hannah Graf =

British Army officer and transgender rights activist

Hannah Graf MBE
- Spouse: Jake Graf (m. 2018)
- Military career
- Allegiance: United Kingdom
- Branch: British Army
- Rank: Captain
- Unit: Royal Electrical and Mechanical Engineers

Captain Hannah Graf MBE (née Winterbourne) is a former officer of the British Army and a transgender rights activist. Graf was a captain in the Royal Electrical and Mechanical Engineers and the highest-ranking transgender officer in the British Army, overseeing a company of a hundred soldiers. After she came out as transgender in 2013, she advised the army on transgender issues.

== Biography ==
While training as an officer at the Royal Military Academy Sandhurst, Graf openly identified as a gay man, however she felt the identification was "never particularly satisfactory" and "never found much solace in the gay male community". In 2012, she was stationed at the Camp Bastion airbase in Afghanistan. A captain in the Royal Electrical and Mechanical Engineers, she oversaw a company of a hundred soldiers. After returning from a tour of duty in Afghanistan, in 2013, she began living openly as a trans woman and became the highest ranking transgender person in the British Army. Although her colleagues were supportive of her decision to transition, she felt unsure how others would view her after her transition. After coming out, she additionally served as an advisor for transgender issues in the army.

Graf is a patron of the charity Mermaids and served an ambassador for LGBT Sport Cymru. She received an honorary fellowship from Cardiff University in 2016 for her work with the two organisations. In 2018, she was appointed a Member of the Order of the British Empire by Prince William, Duke of Cambridge for "services to the LGBTQ community in the military". After receiving the honour at Buckingham Palace, she voiced her support for the British Army's "embrace" of transgender individuals and criticised recent bans of transgender personnel in the United States military. The LGBT rights organisation Stonewall named Graf their "Trans Role Model of the Year" in 2019.

She met actor and filmmaker Jake Graf, who is also transgender, in December 2015. The couple announced their engagement in 2017 and married the following year. In 2020, the couple had their first child; their experience as transgender parents was broadcast later that year in the Channel 4 documentary Our Baby: A Modern Miracle. Coronet Books published a memoir by the couple, titled Becoming Us, in 2023.
