= Katharina Graf =

Austrian politician (1873–1936)

- Born: 24 February 1873; Capodistria, Slovenia
- Died: 8 November 1936 (aged 63); Amstetten, Lower Austria
- Political party: Social Democratic Workers Party of Austria

Katharina Graf (née Jaklitsch, 24 February 1873 – 8 November 1936) was an Austrian politician of the Social Democratic Workers Party of Austria (SAI). She was elected to the Landtag of Lower Austria from 1919 to 1934 and was a member of the SAI's Central Women's Committee.

== Biography ==
Graf was born on 24 February 1873 in Capodistria (Koper), Slovenia. She worked as a domestic maid in Leoben, Styria, Austria as a young woman, before moving to Amstetten with her husband around 1900.

Graf worked to established the Social Democratic Workers Party of Austria's (SAI) Women's Organization in Amstetten. She was elected as a Member of the Landtag of Lower Austria from 1919 to 1934, serving during the First State Parliament, Second State Parliament and Third State Parliament.

From 1926, Graf was chairwoman of the Lower Austrian Women's State Committee. In 1928 she was part of the Austrian delegation to the Third International Women's Conference of the Social Democratic Party of Austria in Brussels, Belgium. From 1931, she was a member of the Central Women's Committee.

Graf died on 8 November 1936 in Amstetten, Lower Austria.
