= Graph =

Graph may refer to:

== Mathematics ==
- Graph (discrete mathematics), a structure made of vertices and edges
  - Graph theory, the study of such graphs and their properties
- Graph (topology), a topological space resembling a graph in the sense of discrete mathematics
- Graph of a function
- Graph paper
- Chart, a means of representing data (also called a graph)

== Computing ==
- Graph (abstract data type), representing relations or connections
- graph (Unix), a command-line utility
- Conceptual graph, a model for knowledge representation and reasoning
- Microsoft Graph, a Microsoft API developer platform that connects multiple services and devices

== Other uses ==
- HMS Graph, a submarine of the UK Royal Navy

== See also ==
- Graf
- Graff (disambiguation)
- Graph database
- Grapheme, in linguistics
- Graphemics
- Graphic (disambiguation)
- Graft
