= Friedrich Hartmann Graf =

German flautist and composer (1727–1795)

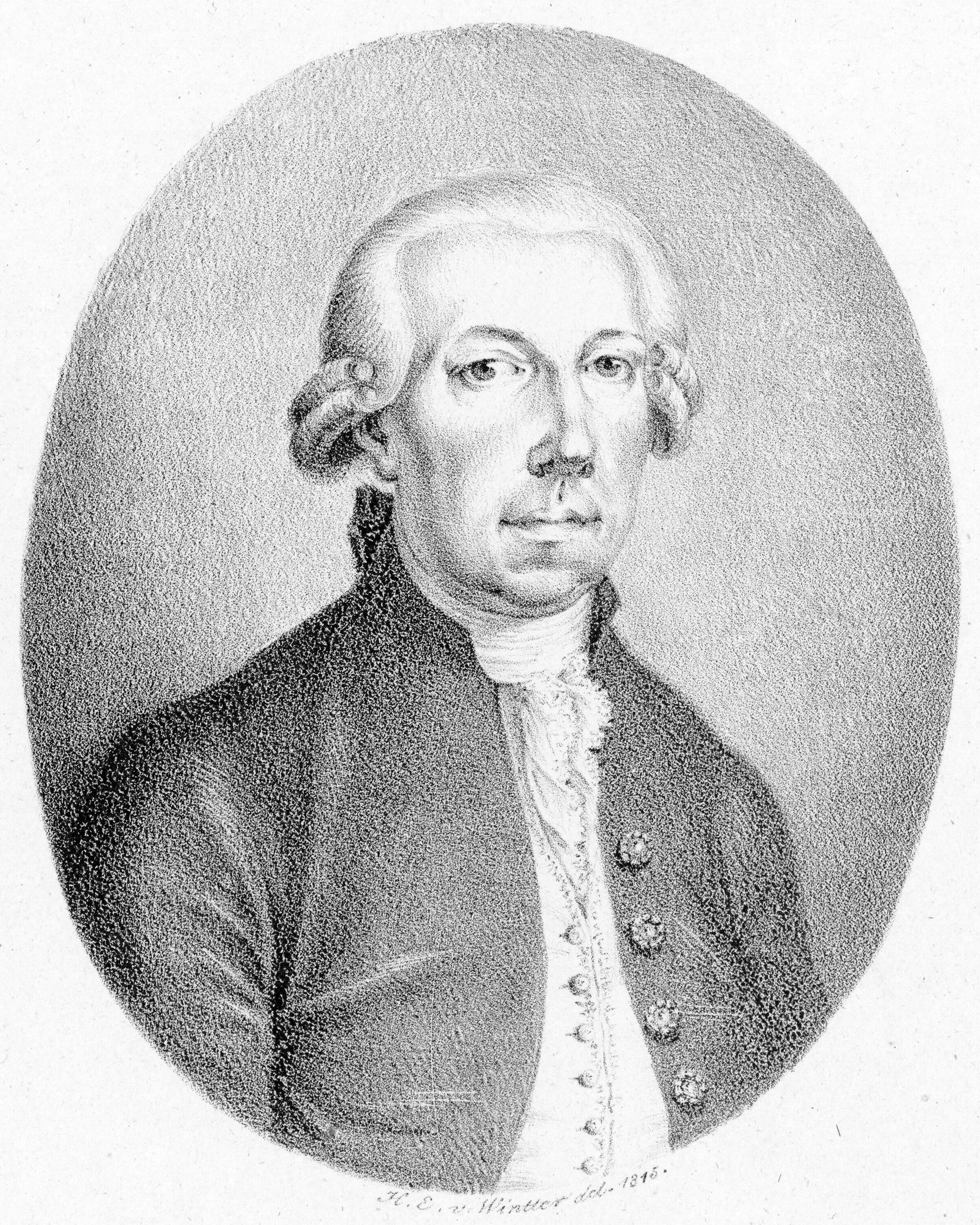
- Friedrich Hartmann Graf
- Born: August 23, 1727; Rudolstadt, Principality of Schwarzburg-Rudolstadt, Holy Roman Empire
- Died: August 19, 1795 (aged 67); Augsburg, Free Imperial City of Augsburg, Holy Roman Empire
- Occupations: Flautist; composer
- Relatives: Brother: Christian Ernst Graf

Friedrich Hartmann Graf (23 August 1727 – 19 August 1795) was a German flautist and composer.

== Early life ==
Graf was born on 23 August 1727 in Rudolstadt.

== Military career ==
He was trained by his father, Johann Graf, and then served as a drummer in a Dutch army regiment, where he was taken as a prisoner of war by the French.

== Musical career ==
After he returned in 1759, he became a flautist and conductor in Hamburg for five years. During that time, he toured England, the Dutch Republic, Italy, Switzerland, and Germany. He was then made first flautist by his brother Christian Ernst Graf, who led the chapel of the stadtholder's court in The Hague. Later, he became the music director of all Protestant churches and cantor of the school of St. Anna in Augsburg, where he founded a civil society concert in 1779. Here he also met Mozart.

== Death ==
Graf died on 19 August 1795 in Augsburg.
