= Van de Graaf (surname) =

Van de Graaf, also spelled van de Graaff, van der Graaf or van der Graaff, is a Dutch surname. Notable people with this surname include the following:

Van de Graaf

- Bobbie van de Graaf (born 1944), Dutch rower, unrelated to Freek and Jan
- Janet van de Graaf, Canadian improv artist and television actress
- Jeff Van de Graaf (born 1959), Australian swimmer
- Willem Jacob van de Graaf (1736–1804), Governor of Dutch Ceylon

Van de Graaff

- Adrian Van de Graaff (1891–1936), American college football player and coach
- Freek van de Graaff (1944–2009), Dutch rower, unrelated to Bobbie and Jan
- Hargrove Van de Graaff (1893–1938), American college football player
- Hendrik Jan van de Graaff (1782–1827), Dutch colonial administrator
- Jan van de Graaff (born 1944), Dutch rower, unrelated to Bobbie and Freek
- Peter Van de Graaff (born 1961), American singer and radio personality
- Robert J. Van de Graaff (1901–1967), American physicist
- William T. Van de Graaff (1895–1977), American football player

Van der Graaf

- Jan van der Graaf (1937–2022), Dutch church administrator
- Karen Van der Graaf (born 1962), Australian swimmer
- Pascal van der Graaf (born 1979), Dutch painter
- Valerie van der Graaf (born 1992), Dutch model
- Volkert van der Graaf (born 1969), Dutch environmentalist and assassin

Van der Graaff

- Laurien van der Graaff (born 1987), Swiss cross-country skier

== See also ==
- de Graaf (surname)
- Van de Graaf canon, page construction originated in 1946 by Joh. A. van de Graaf in his Nieuwe berekening voor de vormgeving
- Van de Graaff (crater)
- Van de Graaff generator, an electrostatic generator that generates very high electrostatically stable voltages
- Van der Graaf Generator, an English progressive rock band
