= Kevin M. Donegan =

United States Navy vice admiral

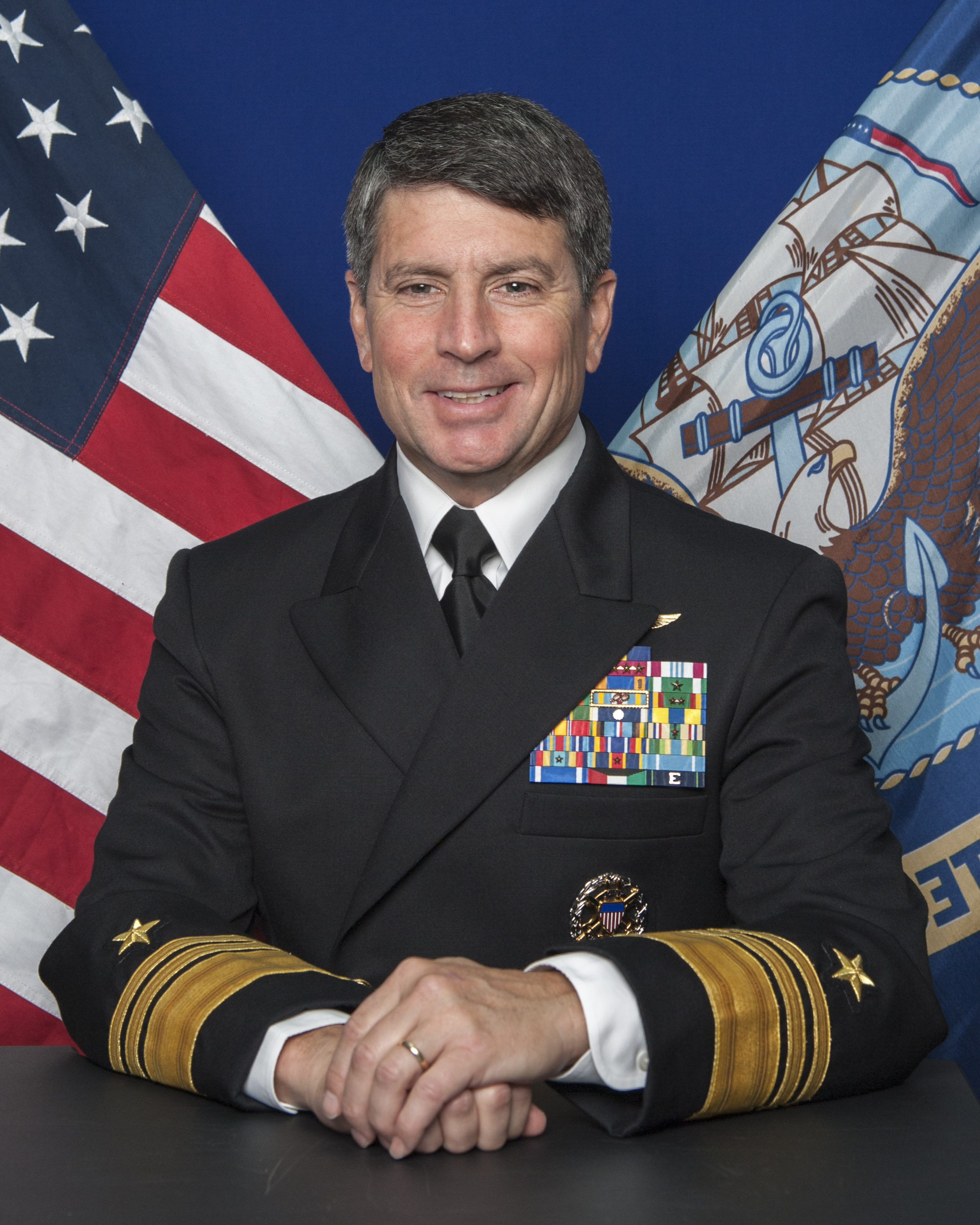
Vice Admiral Kevin M. Donegan

Kevin M. Donegan (born 1958) is a former United States Navy vice admiral. He last served as the Director of Navy Staff and Deputy Chief of Naval Operations for Operations, Plans and Strategy. Before that, he was the commander of the United States Fifth Fleet from September 3, 2015 to September 2017. Earlier in his career, Donegan was a United States Naval Aviator and had various command roles within both operating forces and the shore establishment. He retired from the Navy on August 1, 2018.

== Education ==
Donegan received a Bachelor of Science in aerospace engineering from the University of Virginia in 1980. He also attended United States Naval Test Pilot School, where he graduated as the outstanding student, the United States Navy Strike Fighter Tactics Instructor program, United States Navy Nuclear Power School, the USAF Air Command and Staff College, the Joint Forces Staff College, and Harvard Kennedy School of Government's Executive Education Program in National and International Security.

== 2016 U.S-Iran naval incident ==
Donegan presided over the capture of 10 U.S. Navy sailors by Iran's revolutionary guards on January 12, 2016. These sailors were released in 15 hours without incident.

== Awards and decorations ==
Naval Aviator insignia
Joint Staff Identification Badge

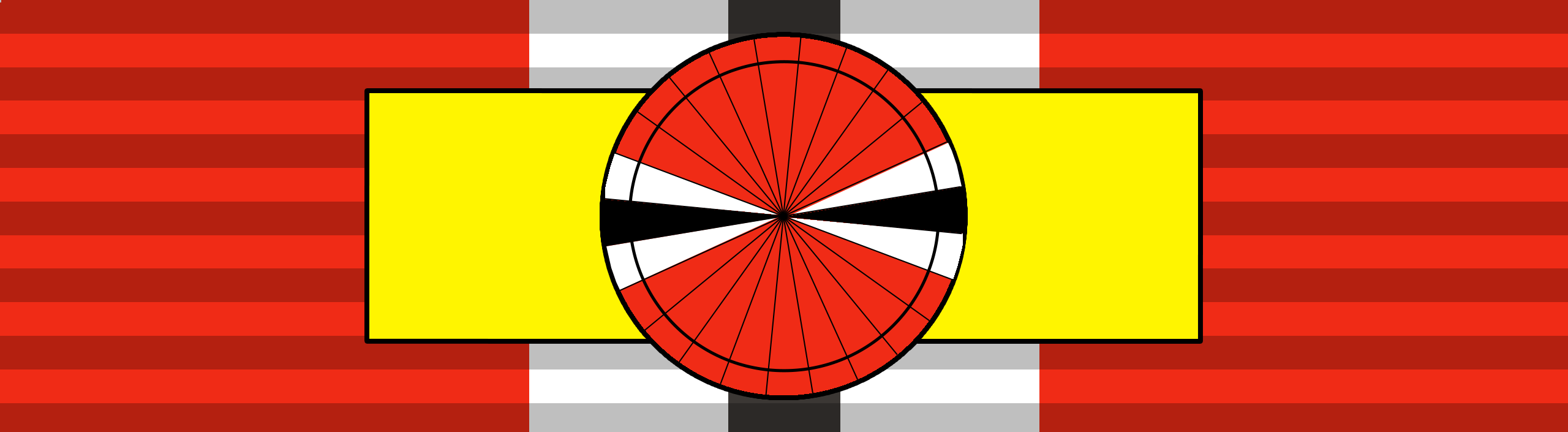
Navy Distinguished Service Medal with one gold award star
Defense Superior Service Medal
Legion of Merit with four award stars
Defense Meritorious Service Medal
Meritorious Service Medal with three award stars
Air Medal with bronze Strike/Flight numeral "1"
Navy and Marine Corps Commendation Medal with award star
Navy and Marine Corps Achievement Medal with award star
Joint Meritorious Unit Award with two bronze oak leaf clusters
Navy Unit Commendation with two bronze service stars
Navy Meritorious Unit Commendation with service star
Navy "E" Ribbon with wreathed Battle E device
Navy Expeditionary Medal
National Defense Service Medal with service star
Armed Forces Expeditionary Medal
Southwest Asia Service Medal with service star
Global War on Terrorism Expeditionary Medal
Global War on Terrorism Service Medal
Armed Forces Service Medal
Navy Sea Service Deployment Ribbon with service star
Navy & Marine Corps Overseas Service Ribbon with service star
The Khalifyyeh Order of Bahrain, 1st class
United Nations Medal
NATO Medal for the former Yugoslavia
Kuwait Liberation Medal (Kuwait)
Navy Expert Pistol Shot Medal
