= Volleyball at the 1964 Summer Olympics – Men's team rosters =

The following squads took part in the 1964 Men's Olympic Volleyball Tournament. It was the first edition of the event, organised by the world's governing body, the FIVB in conjunction with the IOC. It was held in Yokohama and Tokyo, Japan from 13 to 23 October 1964.

== Brazil ==
- João Cláudio França
- José da Costa
- Hamilton de Oliveira
- Emanuel Newdon
- Carlos Feitosa
- Marco Antônio Volpi
- Carlos Arthur Nuzman
- Josias Ramalho
- Décio Viotti de Azevedo
- Victor Barcellos Borges
- Giuseppe Mezzasalma
- Pedro Barbosa de Oliveira

Head coach

- Samy Mehlinski

== Bulgaria ==
- Dimitar Karov
- Ivan Kochev
- Georgi Konstantinov
- Petko Pantaleev
- Petar Krachmarov
- Simeon Srandev
- Lachezar Stoyanov
- Boris Gyuderov
- Kiril Ivanov
- Slavcho Slavov
- Georgi Boyadzhiev
- Angel Koritarov

Head coach Dimitar Zahariev

== Czechoslovakia ==
- Milan Čuda
- Bohumil Golián
- Zdeněk Humhal
- Petr Kop
- Josef Labuda
- Josef Musil
- Karel Paulus
- Boris Perušič
- Pavel Schenk
- Vac Smidl
- Josef Šorm
- Ladislav Toman

Head coach

== Hungary ==
- Béla Czafik
- Vilmos Iváncsó
- Csaba Lantos
- Gábor Bodó
- István Molnár
- Ottó Prouza
- Ferenc Tüske
- Tibor Flórián
- László Gálos
- Antal Kangyerka
- Mihály Tatár
- Ferenc Jánosi

Head coach

== Japan ==
- Yutaka Demachi
- Tsutomu Koyama
- Sadatoshi Sugahara
- Naohiro Ikeda
- Yassu Saito
- Toshiaki Kosedo
- Toki Higuchi
- Massa Minami
- Takeshi Tokutomi
- Teru Moriyama
- Yūzo Nakamura
- Katsutoshi Nekoda

Head coach Yasutaka Matsudaira

== Netherlands ==
- Frank Constandse
- Jacques Ewalds
- Rob Groenhuyzen
- Jan van der Hoek
- Jurjaan Koolen
- Jaap Korsloot
- Jan Oosterbaan
- Dinco van der Stoep
- Piet Swieter
- Joop Tinkhof
- Jacques de Vink
- Hans van Wijnen

Head coach

== Romania ==
- Gheorghe Fieraru
- Horaţiu Nicolau
- Aurel Drăgan
- Iuliu Szöcs
- William Schreiber
- Mihai Grigorovici
- Davila Plocon
- Nicolae Bărbuţă
- Eduard Derzsei
- Mihai Chezan
- Constantin Ganciu
- Mihai Coste

Head coach

== South Korea ==
- Kim In-su
- O Pyeong-gil
- Son Yeong-wan
- Jeong Seon-hong
- Park Seo-gwang
- Seo Ban-seok
- Lee Gyu-so
- Kim Yeong-jun
- Kim Seong-gil
- Kim Gwang-su
- Kim Jin-hui
- Im Tae-ho

Head coach

== Soviet Union ==
- Ivan Bugaenkov
- Nikolai Burobin
- Yuri Chesnokov
- Vascha Kacharava
- Valery Kalatschikhin
- Vitaly Kovalenko
- Stanislav Ljugailo
- Georgy Mondzolevsky
- Yuri Poryarkov
- Eduard Sibiryakov
- Yuri Vengorovsky
- Dimitri Voskoboynikov

Head coach

== United States ==
- Mike Bright
- Barry Brown
- Keith Erickson
- William Griebenow
- Richard Hammer
- Jacob Highland
- Ron Lang
- Charles Nelson
- Michael O'Hara
- Ernie Suwara
- John Taylor
- Pedro Velasco

Head coach

- Harry Wilson
