= List of 1964 Summer Olympics medal winners =

The following is a list of medalists at the 1964 Summer Olympics, held in Tokyo, from 10 to 24 October 1964.

== Athletics ==
=== Men's events ===
Event	Gold	Silver	Bronze
100 m	Bob Hayes; United States	Enrique Figuerola; Cuba	Harry Jerome; Canada
200 m	Henry Carr; United States	Paul Drayton; United States	Edwin Roberts; Trinidad and Tobago
400 m	Mike Larrabee; United States	Wendell Mottley; Trinidad and Tobago	Andrzej Badeński; Poland
800 m	Peter Snell; New Zealand	Bill Crothers; Canada	Wilson Kiprugut; Kenya
1500 m	Peter Snell; New Zealand	Josef Odložil; Czechoslovakia	John Davies; New Zealand
5000 m	Bob Schul; United States	Harald Norpoth; United Team of Germany	Bill Dellinger; United States
10,000 m	Billy Mills; United States	Mohammed Gammoudi; Tunisia	Ron Clarke; Australia
110 m hurdles	Hayes Jones; United States	Blaine Lindgren; United States	Anatoly Mikhailov; Soviet Union
400 m hurdles	Rex Cawley; United States	John Cooper; Great Britain	Salvatore Morale; Italy
3000 m steeplechase	Gaston Roelants; Belgium	Maurice Herriott; Great Britain	Ivan Belyayev; Soviet Union
4 × 100 m relay	United States; Paul Drayton; Gerry Ashworth; Richard Stebbins; Bob Hayes	Poland; Andrzej Zieliński; Wiesław Maniak; Marian Foik; Marian Dudziak	France; Paul Genevay; Bernard Laidebeur; Claude Piquemal; Jocelyn Delecour
4 × 400 m relay	United States; Ollan Cassell; Mike Larrabee; Ulis Williams; Henry Carr	Great Britain; Tim Graham; Adrian Metcalfe; John Cooper; Robbie Brightwell	Trinidad and Tobago; Edwin Skinner; Kent Bernard; Edwin Roberts; Wendell Mottley
marathon	Abebe Bikila; Ethiopia	Basil Heatley; Great Britain	Kokichi Tsuburaya; Japan
20 km walk	Ken Matthews; Great Britain	Dieter Lindner; United Team of Germany	Volodymyr Holubnychy; Soviet Union
50 km walk	Abdon Pamich; Italy	Paul Nihill; Great Britain	Ingvar Pettersson; Sweden
long jump	Lynn Davies; Great Britain	Ralph Boston; United States	Igor Ter-Ovanesyan; Soviet Union
triple jump	Józef Szmidt; Poland	Oleg Fyodoseyev; Soviet Union	Victor Kravchenko; Soviet Union
high jump	Valeriy Brumel; Soviet Union	John Thomas; United States	John Rambo; United States
pole vault	Fred Hansen; United States	Wolfgang Reinhardt; United Team of Germany	Klaus Lehnertz; United Team of Germany
shot put	Dallas Long; United States	Randy Matson; United States	Vilmos Varju; Hungary
discus throw	Al Oerter; United States	Ludvik Danek; Czechoslovakia	Dave Weill; United States
javelin throw	Pauli Nevala; Finland	Gergely Kulcsár; Hungary	Jānis Lūsis; Soviet Union
hammer throw	Romuald Klim; Soviet Union	Gyula Zsivótzky; Hungary	Uwe Beyer; United Team of Germany
decathlon	Willi Holdorf; United Team of Germany	Rein Aun; Soviet Union	Hans-Joachim Walde; United Team of Germany

=== Women's events ===
Event	Gold	Silver	Bronze
100 m	Wyomia Tyus; United States	Edith McGuire; United States	Ewa Kłobukowska; Poland
200 m	Edith McGuire; United States	Irena Kirszenstein; Poland	Marilyn Black; Australia
400 m	Betty Cuthbert; Australia	Ann Packer; Great Britain	Judy Amoore; Australia
800 m	Ann Packer; Great Britain	Maryvonne Dupureur; France	Marise Chamberlain; New Zealand
80 m hurdles	Karin Balzer; United Team of Germany	Teresa Ciepły; Poland	Pam Kilborn; Australia
4 × 100 m relay	Poland; Teresa Ciepły; Irena Kirszenstein; Halina Górecka; Ewa Kłobukowska	United States; Willye White; Wyomia Tyus; Marilyn White; Edith McGuire	Great Britain; Janet Simpson; Mary Rand; Daphne Arden; Dorothy Hyman
high jump	Iolanda Balaş; Romania	Michele Brown; Australia	Taisia Chenchik; Soviet Union
long jump	Mary Rand; Great Britain	Irena Kirszenstein; Poland	Tatyana Schelkanova; Soviet Union
shot put	Tamara Press; Soviet Union	Renate Culmberger; United Team of Germany	Galina Zybina; Soviet Union
discus throw	Tamara Press; Soviet Union	Ingrid Lotz; United Team of Germany	Lia Manoliu; Romania
javelin throw	Mihaela Peneş; Romania	Márta Rudas; Hungary	Yelena Gorchakova; Soviet Union
pentathlon	Irina Press; Soviet Union	Mary Rand; Great Britain	Galina Bystrova; Soviet Union

== Basketball ==
Event	Gold	Silver	Bronze
Men's tournament	United States; Jim Barnes; Bill Bradley; Larry Brown; Joe Caldwell; Mel Counts; Richard Davies; Walt Hazzard; Lucious Jackson; John McCaffrey; Jeff Mullins; Jerry Shipp; George Wilson	Soviet Union; Valdis Muižnieks; Mykola Bahley; Armenak Alachachian; Alexandr Travin; Viacheslav Khrynin; Jānis Krūmiņš; Levan Moseshvili; Yury Korneev; Alexsandr Petrov; Gennadi Volnov; Jaak Lipso; Juris Kalniņš	Brazil; Amaury Antônio Pasos; Wlamir Marques; Ubiratan Pereira Maciel; Carlos Domingos Massoni; Friedrich Wilhem Braun; Carmo de Souza; Jatyr Eduardo Schall; Edson Bispo dos Santos; Antonio Salvador Sucar; Victor Mirshawka; Sergio de Toledo Machado; Jose Edvar Simoes

== Boxing ==
Event	Gold	Silver	Bronze
Flyweight (<51 kg)	Fernando Atzori; Italy	Artur Olech; Poland	Robert John Carmody; United States
Flyweight (<51 kg)	Fernando Atzori; Italy	Artur Olech; Poland	Stanislav Sorokin; Soviet Union
Bantamweight (<54 kg)	Takao Sakurai; Japan	Chung Shin-Cho; South Korea	Juan Fabila Mendoza; Mexico
Bantamweight (<54 kg)	Takao Sakurai; Japan	Chung Shin-Cho; South Korea	Washington Rodríguez; Uruguay
Featherweight (<57 kg)	Stanislav Stepashkin; Soviet Union	Anthony Villanueva; Philippines	Heinz Schulz; United Team of Germany
Featherweight (<57 kg)	Stanislav Stepashkin; Soviet Union	Anthony Villanueva; Philippines	Charles Brown; United States
Lightweight (<60 kg)	Józef Grudzień; Poland	Velikton Barannikov; Soviet Union	Jim McCourt; Ireland
Lightweight (<60 kg)	Józef Grudzień; Poland	Velikton Barannikov; Soviet Union	Ronald Allen Harris; United States
Light welterweight (<63.5 kg)	Jerzy Kulej; Poland	Yevgeny Frolov; Soviet Union	Habib Galhia; Tunisia
Light welterweight (<63.5 kg)	Jerzy Kulej; Poland	Yevgeny Frolov; Soviet Union	Eddie Blay; Ghana
Welterweight (<67 kg)	Marian Kasprzyk; Poland	Ričardas Tamulis; Soviet Union	Pertti Purhonen; Finland
Welterweight (<67 kg)	Marian Kasprzyk; Poland	Ričardas Tamulis; Soviet Union	Silvano Bertini; Italy
Light middleweight (<71 kg)	Boris Lagutin; Soviet Union	Joseph Gonzales; France	Nojim Maiyegun; Nigeria
Light middleweight (<71 kg)	Boris Lagutin; Soviet Union	Joseph Gonzales; France	Józef Grzesiak; Poland
Middleweight (<75 kg)	Valeri Popenchenko; Soviet Union	Emil Schulz; United Team of Germany	Franco Valle; Italy
Middleweight (<75 kg)	Valeri Popenchenko; Soviet Union	Emil Schulz; United Team of Germany	Tadeusz Walasek; Poland
Light heavyweight (<81 kg)	Cosimo Pinto; Italy	Aleksei Kiselyov; Soviet Union	Alexander Nikolov; Bulgaria
Light heavyweight (<81 kg)	Cosimo Pinto; Italy	Aleksei Kiselyov; Soviet Union	Zbigniew Pietrzykowski; Poland
Heavyweight (>81 kg)	Joe Frazier; United States	Hans Huber; United Team of Germany	Giuseppe Ros; Italy
Heavyweight (>81 kg)	Joe Frazier; United States	Hans Huber; United Team of Germany	Vadim Yemelyanov; Soviet Union

== Canoeing ==
=== Men's events ===
Event	Gold	Silver	Bronze
C-1 1000 metres	Jürgen Eschert (EUA)	Andrei Igorov (ROU)	Yevgeny Penyayev (URS)
C-2 1000 metres	Andrei Khimich and Stepan Oshchepkov (URS)	Jean Boudehen and Michel Chapuis (FRA)	Peer Nielsen and John Sørensen (DEN)
K-1 1000 metres	Rolf Peterson; Sweden	Mihály Hesz; Hungary	Aurel Vernescu; Romania
K-2 1000 metres	Gunnar Utterberg and Sven-Olov Sjödelius (SWE)	Antonius Geurts and Paul Hoekstra (NED)	Heinz Büker and Holger Zander (EUA)
K-4 1000 metres	Soviet Union; Nikolai Chuzhikov; Anatoli Grishin; Vyacheslav Ionov; Vladimir Morozov	United Team of Germany; Günther Perleberg; Bernhard Schulze; Friedhelm Wentzke; Holger Zander	Romania; Simion Cuciuc; Atanase Sciotnic; Mihai Țurcaș; Aurel Vernescu

=== Women's events ===
Event	Gold	Silver	Bronze
K-1 500 metres	Lyudmila Khvedosyuk; Soviet Union	Hilde Lauer; Romania	Marcia Jones; United States
K-2 500 metres	Roswitha Esser and Annemarie Zimmermann (EUA)	Francine Fox and Glorianne Perrier (USA)	Hilde Lauer and Cornelia Sideri (ROU)

== Cycling ==
=== Road cycling ===
Event	Gold	Silver	Bronze
Individual road race	Mario Zanin; Italy	Kjeld Rodian; Denmark	Walter Godefroot; Belgium
Team time trial	Netherlands; Bart Zoet; Evert Dolman; Gerben Karstens; Jan Pieterse	Italy; Ferruccio Manza; Severino Andreoli; Luciano Dalla Bona; Pietro Guerra	Sweden; Sture Pettersson; Sven Hamrin; Erik Pettersson; Gösta Pettersson

=== Track cycling ===
Event	Gold	Silver	Bronze
Individual pursuit	Jiří Daler; Czechoslovakia	Giorgio Ursi; Italy	Preben Isaksson; Denmark
Team pursuit	United Team of Germany; Ernst Streng; Lothar Claesges; Karlheinz Henrichs; Karl Link	Italy; Franco Testa; Cencio Mantovani; Carlo Rancati; Luigi Roncaglia	Netherlands; Cor Schuuring; Henk Cornelisse; Gerard Koel; Jaap Oudkerk
Sprint	Giovanni Pettenella; Italy	Sergio Bianchetto; Italy	Daniel Morelon; France
Tandem	Angelo Damiano and Sergio Bianchetto; Italy	Imants Bodnieks and Viktor Logunov; Soviet Union	Willi Fuggerer and Klaus Kobusch; United Team of Germany
1000m time trial	Patrick Sercu; Belgium	Giovanni Pettenella; Italy	Pierre Trentin; France

== Diving ==
=== Men ===
Event	Gold	Silver	Bronze
3 m springboard	Kenneth Sitzberger; United States	Frank Gorman; United States	Lawrence Andreasen; United States
10 m platform	Bob Webster; United States	Klaus Dibiasi; Italy	Tom Gompf; United States

=== Women ===
Event	Gold	Silver	Bronze
3 m springboard	Ingrid Krämer; United Team of Germany	Jeanne Collier; United States	Patsy Willard; United States
10 m platform	Lesley Bush; United States	Ingrid Krämer; United Team of Germany	Galina Alekseyeva; Soviet Union

== Equestrian ==
Event	Gold	Silver	Bronze
Individual dressage	Henri Chammartin and Wörmann (SUI)	Harry Boldt and Remus (EUA)	Sergei Filatov and Absent (URS)
Team dressage	United Team of Germany; Harry Boldt and Remus; Reiner Klimke and Dux; Josef Neckermann and Antoinette	Switzerland; Henri Chammartin and Wörmann; Gustav Fischer and Wald; Marianne Gossweiler and Stephan	Soviet Union; Sergei Filatov and Absent; Ivan Kizimov and Ikhor; Ivan Kalita and Moar
Individual eventing	Mauro Checcoli and Surbean (ITA)	Carlos Moratorio and Chalan (ARG)	Fritz Ligges and Donkosak (EUA)
Team eventing	Italy; Mauro Checcoli and Surbean; Paolo Angioni and King; Giuseppe Ravano and Royal Love	United States; Michael Page and The Grasshopper; Kevin Freeman and Gallopade; Michael Plumb and Bold Minstrel	United Team of Germany; Fritz Ligges and Donkosak; Horst Karsten and Condora; Gerhard Schulz and Balza X
Individual jumping	Pierre Jonquères d'Oriola and Lutteur B (FRA)	Hermann Schridde and Dozent II (EUA)	Peter Robeson and Firecrest (GBR)
Team jumping	United Team of Germany; Hermann Schridde and Dozent II; Kurt Jarasinski and Torro; Hans Günter Winkler and Fidelitas	France; Pierre Jonquères d'Oriola and Lutteur B Janou Lefèbvre and Kenavo D Guy Lefrant and Monsieur de Littry	Italy; Piero D'Inzeo and Sun Beam; Raimondo D'Inzeo and Posillipo; Graziano Mancinelli and Rockette

== Fencing ==
=== Men's events ===
Event	Gold	Silver	Bronze
Individual épée	Grigory Kriss; Soviet Union	Henry Hoskyns; Great Britain	Guram Kostava; Soviet Union
Team épée	Hungary; Árpád Bárány; Tamás Gábor; István Kausz; Győző Kulcsár; Zoltán Nemere	Italy; Giovan Battista Breda; Giuseppe Delfino; Gianfranco Paolucci; Alberto Pellegrino; Gianluigi Saccaro	France; Claude Bourquard; Claude Brodin; Jacques Brodin; Yves Dreyfus; Jack Guittet
Individual foil	Egon Franke; Poland	Jean Claude Magnan; France	Daniel Revenu; France
Team foil	Soviet Union; Viktor Zhdanovich; Yuri Sharov; Yuri Sisikin; German Sveshnikov; Mark Midler	Poland; Witold Woyda; Zbigniew Skrudlik; Ryszard Parulski; Egon Franke; Janusz Rozycki	France; Jacky Courtillat; Jean-Claude Magnan; Christian Noël; Daniel Revenu; Pierre Rodocanachi
Individual sabre	Tibor Pézsa; Hungary	Claude Arabo; France	Umar Mavlikhanov; Soviet Union
Team sabre	Soviet Union; Boris Melnikov; Nugzar Asatiani; Mark Rakita; Yakov Rylsky; Umar Mavlikhanov	Italy; Giampaolo Calanchini; Wladimiro Calarese; Pier-Luigi Chicca; Mario Ravagnan; Cesare Salvadori	Poland; Emil Ochyra; Jerzy Pawłowski; Ryszard Zub; Andrzej Piatkowski; Wojciech Zabłocki

=== Women's events ===
Event	Gold	Silver	Bronze
Individual foil	Ildikó Újlaky-Rejtő; Hungary	Helga Mees; United Team of Germany	Antonella Ragno; Italy
Team foil	Hungary; Paula Marosi; Katalin Juhász; Judit Ágoston; Lídia Dömölky; Ildikó Újlaky-Rejtő	Soviet Union; Lyudmila Shishova; Valentina Prudskova; Valentina Rastvorova; Tatyana Samusenko; Galina Gorokhova	United Team of Germany; Heidi Schmid; Helga Mees; Rosemarie Scherberger; Gudrun Theuerkauff

== Field hockey ==
Event	Gold	Silver	Bronze
Men's tournament	India; Haripal Kaushik; Mohinder Lal; Shankar Lakshman; Bandu Patil; John Peter; Ali Sayed; Udham Singh Kullar; Charanjit Singh; Darshan Singh; Dharam Singh; Gurbux Singh; Harbinder Singh; Jagjit Singh; Joginder Singh; Prithipal Singh	Pakistan; Abdul Hamid; Muhammad Asad Malik; Munir Dar; Khalid Mahmood; Anwar Khan; Nawaz Khizar; Azam Khurshid; Muhammad Manna; Manzoor Hussain Atif; Mohammed Rashid; Motiullah; Tariq Niazi; Saeed Anwar; Aziz Tariq; Hayat Zafar; Uddin Zaka	Australia; Mervyn Crossman; Paul Dearing; Raymond Evans; Brian Glencross; Robin Hodder; John McBryde; Donald McWatters; Patrick Nilan; Eric Pearce; Julian Pearce; Desmond Piper; Donald Smart; Anthony Waters; Graham Wood

== Football (Soccer) ==
Event	Gold	Silver	Bronze
Men's tournament	Hungary; Ferenc Bene; Tibor Csernai; János Farkas; József Gelei; Kálmán Ihász; Sándor Katona; Imre Komora; Ferenc Nógrádi; Dezső Novák; Árpád Orbán; Károly Palotai; Antal Szentmihályi; Gusztáv Szepesi; Zoltán Varga	Czechoslovakia; Jan Brumovský; Ludovít Cvetler; Ján Geleta; František Knebort; Karel Knesl; Karel Lichtnégl; Vojtech Masný; Štefan Matlák; Ivan Mráz; Karel Nepomucký; Zdeněk Pičman; František Schmucker; Anton Švajlen; Anton Urban; František Valošek; Josef Vojta; Vladimír Weiss	United Team of Germany; Gerd Backhaus; Wolfgang Barthels; Bernd Bauchspieß; Gerhard Körner; Otto Fräßdorf; Henning Frenzel; Dieter Engelhardt; Herbert Pankau; Manfred Geisler; Jürgen Heinsch; Klaus Lisiewicz; Jürgen Nöldner; Peter Rock; Klaus-Dieter Seehaus; Hermann Stöcker; Werner Unger; Klaus Urbanczyk; Eberhard Vogel; Manfred Walter; Horst Weigang

== Gymnastics ==
=== Men's events ===
Event	Gold	Silver	Bronze
Individual all-around	Yukio Endo; Japan 115.95 tps	Viktor Lisitsky; Soviet Union; Boris Shakhlin; Soviet Union; Shuji Tsurumi; Japan 115.40 tps	none awarded
Team all-around	Japan; Yukio Endo; Takuji Hayata; Takashi Mitsukuri; Takashi Ono; Shuji Tsurumi; Haruhiro Yamashita 577.95 tps	Soviet Union; Sergey Diomidov; Viktor Leontev; Viktor Lisitsky; Boris Shakhlin; Yuri Titov; Yuri Tsapenko 575.45 tps	United Team of Germany; Siegfried Fülle; Philipp Fürst; Erwin Koppe; Klaus Köste; Günter Lyhs; Peter Weber 565.10 tps
Floor exercise	Franco Menichelli; Italy 19.450 tps	Yukio Endo; Japan; Viktor Lisitsky; Soviet Union 19.350 tps	none awarded
Horizontal bar	Boris Shakhlin; Soviet Union 19.625 tps	Yuri Titov; Soviet Union 19.550 tps	Miroslav Cerar; Yugoslavia 19.500 tps
Parallel bars	Yukio Endo; Japan 19.675 tps	Shuji Tsurumi; Japan 19.450 tps	Franco Menichelli; Italy 19.350 tps
Pommel horse	Miroslav Cerar; Yugoslavia 19.525 tps	Shuji Tsurumi; Japan 19.325 tps	Yuri Tsapenko; Soviet Union 19.200 tps
Rings	Takuji Hayata; Japan 19.475 tps	Franco Menichelli; Italy 19.425 tps	Boris Shakhlin; Soviet Union 19.400 tps
Vault	Haruhiro Yamashita; Japan 19.600 tps	Viktor Lisitsky; Soviet Union 19.325 tps	Hannu Rantakari; Finland 19.300 tps

=== Women's ===
Event	Gold	Silver	Bronze
Individual all-around	Věra Čáslavská; Czechoslovakia 77.564 tps	Larisa Latynina; Soviet Union 76.998 tps	Polina Astakhova; Soviet Union 76.965 tps
Team all-around	Soviet Union; Polina Astakhova; Lyudmila Gromova; Larisa Latynina; Tamara Manina; Elena Volchetskaya; Tamara Zamotaylova 380.890 tps	Czechoslovakia; Věra Čáslavská; Marianna Krajčírová; Jana Posnerová; Hana Růžičková; Jaroslava Sedláčková; Adolfína Tkačíková 379.989 tps	Japan; Toshiko Aihara; Ginko Chiba; Keiko Ikeda; Taniko Nakamura; Kiyoko Ono; Hiroko Tsuji 377.889 tps
Balance beam	Věra Čáslavská; Czechoslovakia 19.449 tps	Tamara Manina; Soviet Union 19.399 tps	Larisa Latynina; Soviet Union 19.382 tps
Floor exercise	Larisa Latynina; Soviet Union 19.599 tps	Polina Astakhova; Soviet Union 19.500 tps	Anikó Ducza; Hungary 19.300 tps
Uneven bars	Polina Astakhova; Soviet Union 19.332 tps	Katalin Makray; Hungary 19.216 tps	Larisa Latynina; Soviet Union 19.199 tps
Vault	Věra Čáslavská; Czechoslovakia 19.483 tps	Larisa Latynina; Soviet Union; Birgit Radochla; United Team of Germany 19.283 tps	None awarded

== Judo ==
Event	Gold	Silver	Bronze
Lightweight; 68 kg	Takehide Nakatani; Japan	Eric Hänni; Switzerland	Ārons Bogoļubovs; Soviet Union Oleg Stepanov; Soviet Union
Middleweight; 80 kg	Isao Okano; Japan	Wolfgang Hofmann; United Team of Germany	James Bregman; United States Kim Eui-tae; South Korea
Heavyweight +80 kg	Isao Inokuma; Japan	Doug Rogers; Canada	Parnaoz Chikviladze; Soviet Union Anzor Kiknadze; Soviet Union
Open category	Anton Geesink; Netherlands	Akio Kaminaga; Japan	Theodore Boronovskis; Australia Klaus Glahn; United Team of Germany

== Modern pentathlon ==
Event	Gold	Silver	Bronze
Individual	Ferenc Török; Hungary 5116 tps	Igor Novikov; Soviet Union 5067 tps	Albert Mokeev; Soviet Union 5039 tps
Team	Soviet Union; Albert Mokeev; Igor Novikov; Viktor Mineev 14 961 tps	United States; James Moore; David Kirkwood; Paul Pesthy 14 189 tps	Hungary; Ferenc Török; Imre Nagy; Ottó Török 14 173 tps

== Rowing ==
Event	Gold	Silver	Bronze
single sculls	Vyacheslav Ivanov; Soviet Union 8:22.51	Achim Hill; United Team of Germany 8:26.24	Gottfried Kottmann; Switzerland 8:29.68
double sculls	Soviet Union; Oleg Tyurin; Boris Dubrovskiy 7:10.66	United States; Seymour Cromwell; Jim Storm 7:13.16	Czechoslovakia; Vladimír Andrs; Pavel Hofmann 7:14.23
coxless pairs	Canada; George Hungerford; Roger Jackson 7:32.94	Netherlands; Steven Blaisse; Ernst Veenemans 7:33.40	United Team of Germany; Michael Schwan; Wolfgang Hottenrott 7:38.63
coxed pair	United States; Edward Ferry; Conn Findlay; Kent Mitchell (cox) 8:21.23	France; Jacques Morel; Georges Morel; Jean-Claude Darouy (cox) 8:23.15	Netherlands; Herman Rouwé; Erik Hartsuiker; Jan Just Bos (cox) 8:23.42
coxless fours	Denmark; John Hansen; Bjørn Hasløv; Erik Petersen; Kurt Helmudt 6:59.30	Great Britain; John Russell; Hugh Wardell-Yerburgh; William Barry; John James 7:00.47	United States; Geoffrey Picard; Dick Lyon; Ted Mittet; Ted Nash 7:01.37
coxed fours	United Team of Germany; Peter Neusel; Bernhard Britting; Joachim Werner; Egbert Hirschfelder; Jürgen Oelke 7:00.44	Italy; Renato Bosatta; Emilio Trivini; Giuseppe Galante; Franco De Pedrina; Giovanni Spinola 7:02.84	Netherlands; Lex Mullink; Jan van de Graaff; Freek van de Graaff; Bobbie van de Graaf; Marius Klumperbeek 7:06.46
eights	United States; Joseph Amlong; Thomas Amlong; Boyce Budd; Emory Clark; Stanley Cwiklinski; Hugh Foley; Bill Knecht; William Stowe; Róbert Zimonyi 6:18.23	United Team of Germany; Klaus Aeffke; Klaus Bittner; Karl-Heinrich von Groddeck; Hans-Jürgen Wallbrecht; Klaus Behrens; Jürgen Schröder; Jürgen Plagemann; Horst Meyer; Thomas Ahrens 6:23.29	Czechoslovakia; Petr Čermák; Jiří Lundák; Jan Mrvík; Július Toček; Josef Věntus; Luděk Pojezný; Bohumil Janoušek; Richard Nový; Miroslav Koníček 6:25.11

== Sailing ==
Event	Gold	Silver	Bronze
1964: Finn	Germany (EUA); Wilhelm Kuhweide	United States (USA); Peter Barrett	Denmark (DEN); Henning Wind
1964: Flying Dutchman	New Zealand (NZL); Helmer Pedersen; Earle Wells	Great Britain (GBR); Keith Musto; Tony Morgan	United States (USA); Harry Melges; William Bentsen
1964: Star	Bahamas (BAH); Durward Knowles; Cecil Cooke	United States (USA); Richard Stearns; Lynn Williams	Sweden (SWE); Pelle Pettersson; Holger Sundström
1964: Dragon	Denmark (DEN); Ole Berntsen; Christian von Bulow; Ole Poulsen	Germany (EUA); Peter Ahrendt; Wilfried Lorenz; Ulrich Mense	United States (USA); Lowell North; Richard Deaver; Charles Rogers
1964: 5.5 Metre	Australia (AUS); William Northam; Peter O'Donnell; James Sargeant	Sweden (SWE); Lars Thörn; Arne Karlsson; Sture Stork	United States (USA); John J. McNamara; Joseph Batchelder; Francis Scully

== Shooting ==
Event	Gold	Silver	Bronze
25 m rapid fire pistol	Pentti Linnosvuo (FIN)	Ion Tripșa (ROU)	Lubomír Nácovský (TCH)
50 m pistol	Väinö Markkanen (FIN)	Franklin Green (USA)	Yoshihisa Yoshikawa (JPN)
50 m rifle prone	László Hammerl (HUN)	Lones Wigger (USA)	Tommy Pool (USA)
50 m rifle three positions	Lones Wigger; United States	Velichko Velichkov; Bulgaria	László Hammerl; Hungary
300 m rifle, three positions	Gary Anderson (USA)	Shota Kveliashvili (URS)	Martin Gunnarsson (USA)
Trap	Ennio Mattarelli; Italy	Pāvels Seničevs; Soviet Union	William Morris; United States

== Swimming ==
=== Men's events ===
Event	Gold		Silver		Bronze	
100 m freestyle	Don Schollander; United States	53.4 (OR)	Robert McGregor; Great Britain	53.5	Hans-Joachim Klein; United Team of Germany	54.0
400 m freestyle	Don Schollander; United States	4:12.2 (WR)	Frank Wiegand; United Team of Germany	4:14.9	Allan Wood; Australia	4:15.1
1500 m freestyle	Bob Windle; Australia	17:01.7 (OR)	John Nelson; United States	17:03.0	Allan Wood; Australia	17:07.7
200 m backstroke	Jed Graef; United States	2:10.3 (WR)	Gary Dilley; United States	2:10.5	Bob Bennett; United States	2:13.1
200 m breaststroke	Ian O'Brien; Australia	2:27.8 (WR)	Georgy Prokopenko; Soviet Union	2:28.2	Chet Jastremski; United States	2:29.6
200 m butterfly	Kevin Berry; Australia	2:06.6 (WR)	Carl Robie; United States	2:07.5	Fred Schmidt; United States	2:09.3
400 m individual medley	Dick Roth; United States	4:45.4 (WR)	Roy Saari; United States	4:47.1	Gerhard Hetz; United Team of Germany	4:51.0
4 × 100 m freestyle relay	United States; Steve Clark; Mike Austin; Gary Ilman; Don Schollander	3:33.2 (WR)	United Team of Germany; Horst Löffler; Frank Wiegand; Uwe Jacobsen; Hans-Joachim Klein	3:37.2	Australia; David Dickson; Peter Doak; John Ryan; Bob Windle	3:39.1
4 × 200 m freestyle relay	United States; Steve Clark; Roy Saari; Gary Ilman; Don Schollander	7:52.1 (WR)	United Team of Germany; Horst-Günther Gregor; Gerhard Hetz; Frank Wiegand; Hans-Joachim Klein	7.59.3	Japan; Makoto Fukui; Kunihiro Iwasaki; Toshio Shoji; Yukiaki Okabe	8:03.8
4 × 100 m medley relay	United States; Thompson Mann; Bill Craig; Fred Schmidt; Steve Clark	3:58.4 (WR)	United Team of Germany; Ernst Küppers; Egon Henninger; Horst-Günther Gregor; Hans-Joachim Klein	4:01.6	Australia; Peter Reynolds; Ian O'Brien; Kevin Berry; David Dickson	4:02.3

=== Women's events ===
Event	Gold		Silver		Bronze	
100 m freestyle	Dawn Fraser; Australia	59.5 (OR)	Sharon Stouder; United States	59.9	Kathy Ellis; United States	1:00.8
400 m freestyle	Ginny Duenkel; United States	4:43.3 (OR)	Marilyn Ramenofsky; United States	4:44.6	Terri Stickles; United States	4:47.2
100 m backstroke	Cathy Ferguson; United States	1:07.7 (WR)	Kiki Caron; France	1:07.9	Ginny Duenkel; United States	1:08.0
200 m breaststroke	Galina Prozumenshchikova; Soviet Union	2:46.4 (OR)	Claudia Kolb; United States	2:47.6	Svetlana Babanina; Soviet Union	2:48.6
100 m butterfly	Sharon Stouder; United States	1:04.7 (WR)	Ada Kok; Netherlands	1:05.6	Kathy Ellis; United States	1:06.0
400 m individual medley	Donna de Varona; United States	5:18.7 (OR)	Sharon Finneran; United States	5:24.1	Martha Randall; United States	5:24.2
4 × 100 metre freestyle relay	United States; Sharon Stouder; Donna de Varona; Lillian Watson; Kathy Ellis	4:03.8 (WR)	Australia; Robyn Thorn; Janice Murphy; Lynette Bell; Dawn Fraser	4:06.9	Netherlands; Pauline van der Wildt; Toos Beumer; Winnie van Weerdenburg; Erica Terpstra	4:12.0
4 × 100 metre medley relay	United States; Cathy Ferguson; Cynthia Goyette; Sharon Stouder; Kathy Ellis	4:33.9 (OR)	Netherlands; Corrie Winkel; Klenie Bimolt; Ada Kok; Erica Terpstra	4:37.0	Soviet Union; Tatyana Savelyeva; Svetlana Babanina; Tatyana Devyatova; Natalya Ustinova	4:39.2

== Volleyball ==
Event	Gold	Silver	Bronze
Men's tournament	Soviet Union; Ivans Bugajenkovs; Nikolay Burobin; Yuri Chesnokov; Vazha K'ach'arava; Valeri Kalachikhin; Vitali Kovalenko; Staņislavs Lugailo; Georgy Mondzolevski; Yuriy Poyarkov; Eduard Sibiryakov; Yury Vengerovsky; Dmitri Voskoboynikov	Czechoslovakia; Milan Čuda; Bohumil Golián; Zdeněk Humhal; Petr Kop; Josef Labuda; Josef Musil; Karel Paulus; Boris Perušič; Pavel Schenk; Václav Šmídl; Josef Šorm; Ladislav Toman	Japan; Yutaka Demachi; Tsutomu Koyama; Sadatoshi Sugahara; Naohiro Ikeda; Yasutaka Sato; Toshiaki Kosedo; Tokihiko Higuchi; Masayuki Minami; Takeshi Tokutomi; Teruhisa Moriyama; Yūzo Nakamura; Katsutoshi Nekoda
Women's tournament	Japan; Masae Kasai; Emiko Miyamoto; Kinuko Tanida; Yuriko Handa; Yoshiko Matsumura; Sata Isobe; Katsumi Matsumura; Yoko Shinozaki; Setsuko Sasaki; Yuko Fujimoto; Maseko Kondo; Ayano Shibuki	Soviet Union; Antonina Ryzhova; Astra Biltauer; Ninel Lukanina; Lyudmila Buldakova; Nelli Abramova; Tamara Tikhonina; Valentina Kamenyok-Vinogradova; Inna Ryskal; Marita Katusheva; Tatyana Roshchina; Valentina Mishak; Lyudmila Gureyeva	Poland; Krystyna Czajkowska; Józefa Ledwig; Maria Golimowska; Jadwiga Rutkowska; Danuta Kordaczuk; Krystyna Jakubowska; Jadwiga Książek; Maria Śliwka; Zofia Szczęśniewska; Krystyna Krupa; Hanna Krystyna Busz; Barbara Hermela-Niemczyk

== Water polo ==
Event	Gold	Silver	Bronze
Men's tournament	Hungary; Miklós Ambrus; László Felkai; János Konrád; Zoltán Dömötör; Tivadar Kanizsa; Péter Rusorán; György Kárpáti; Mihály Mayer; Dezső Gyarmati; Dénes Pócsik; András Bodnár	Yugoslavia; Milan Muškatirović; Ivo Trumbić; Vinko Rosić; Zlatko Šimenc; Božidar Stanišić; Ante Nardelli; Zoran Janković; Mirko Sandić; Frane Nonković; Ozren Bonačić; Karlo Stipanić	Soviet Union; Igor Grabovsky; Vladimir Kuznetsov; Boris Grishin; Boris Popov; Nikolay Kalashnikov; Zenon Bortkevich; Nikolay Kuznetsov; Vladimir Semyonov; Viktor Ageyev; Leonid Osipov; Eduard Egorov

== Weightlifting ==
Event	Gold		Silver		Bronze	
Bantamweight (56 kg)	Aleksey Vakhonin; Soviet Union	357.5 kg	Imre Földi; Hungary	355.0 kg	Shiro Ichinoseki; Japan	347.5 kg
Featherweight (60 kg)	Yoshinobu Miyake; Japan	397.5 kg	Isaac Berger; United States	382.5 kg	Mieczysław Nowak; Poland	377.5 kg
Lightweight (67.5 kg)	Waldemar Baszanowski; Poland	432.5 kg	Vladimir Kaplunov; Soviet Union	432.5 kg	Marian Zieliński; Poland	420.0 kg
Middleweight (75 kg)	Hans Zdražila; Czechoslovakia	445.0 kg	Viktor Kurentsov; Soviet Union	440.0 kg	Masushi Ouchi; Japan	437.5 kg
Light heavyweight (82.5 kg)	Rudolf Plyukfelder; Soviet Union	475.0 kg	Géza Tóth; Hungary	467.5 kg	Győző Veres; Hungary	467.5 kg
Middle heavyweight (90 kg)	Vladimir Golovanov; Soviet Union	487.5 kg	Louis Martin; Great Britain	475.0 kg	Ireneusz Paliński; Poland	467.5 kg
Heavyweight (+90 kg)	Leonid Zhabotinsky; Soviet Union	572.5 kg	Yury Vlasov; Soviet Union	570.0 kg	Norbert Schemansky; United States	537.5 kg

== Wrestling ==
=== Greco-Roman ===
Event	Gold	Silver	Bronze
Flyweight	Tsutomu Hanahara; Japan	Angel Kerezov; Bulgaria	Dumitru Pârvulescu; Romania
Bantamweight	Masamitsu Ichiguchi; Japan	Vladlen Trostyansky; Soviet Union	Ion Cernea; Romania
Featherweight	Imre Polyák; Hungary	Roman Rurua; Soviet Union	Branislav Martinović; Yugoslavia
Lightweight	Kazım Ayvaz; Turkey	Valeriu Bularca; Romania	David Gvantseladze; Soviet Union
Welterweight	Anatoly Kolesov; Soviet Union	Kiril Petkov; Bulgaria	Bertil Nyström; Sweden
Middleweight	Branislav Simić; Yugoslavia	Jiří Kormaník; Czechoslovakia	Lothar Metz; United Team of Germany
Light Heavyweight	Boyan Radev; Bulgaria	Per Svensson; Sweden	Heinz Kiehl; United Team of Germany
Heavyweight	István Kozma; Hungary	Anatoly Roshchin; Soviet Union	Wilfried Dietrich; United Team of Germany

=== Freestyle ===
Event	Gold	Silver	Bronze
Flyweight	Yoshikatsu Yoshida; Japan	Chang Chang-Sun; South Korea	Ali Akbar Heidari; Iran
Bantamweight	Yojiro Uetake; Japan	Hüseyin Akbas; Turkey	Aydin Ibrahimov; Soviet Union
Featherweight	Osamu Watanabe; Japan	Stancho Kolev; Bulgaria	Nodar Khokhashvili; Soviet Union
Lightweight	Enyu Valchev; Bulgaria	Klaus Rost; United Team of Germany	Iwao Horiuchi; Japan
Welterweight	İsmail Ogan; Turkey	Guliko Sagaradze; Soviet Union	Mohammad Ali Sanatkaran; Iran
Middleweight	Prodan Gardzhev; Bulgaria	Hasan Güngör; Turkey	Daniel Brand; United States
Light Heavyweight	Aleksandr Medved; Soviet Union	Ahmet Ayık; Turkey	Said Mustafov; Bulgaria
Heavyweight	Aleksandr Ivanitsky; Soviet Union	Lyutvi Ahmedov; Bulgaria	Hamit Kaplan; Turkey

== See also ==
- 1964 Summer Olympics medal table
