= Volleyball at the 1964 Summer Olympics =

Coordinates: 35.4410°N 139.6365°E

Volleyball at the Games of the XVIII Olympiad
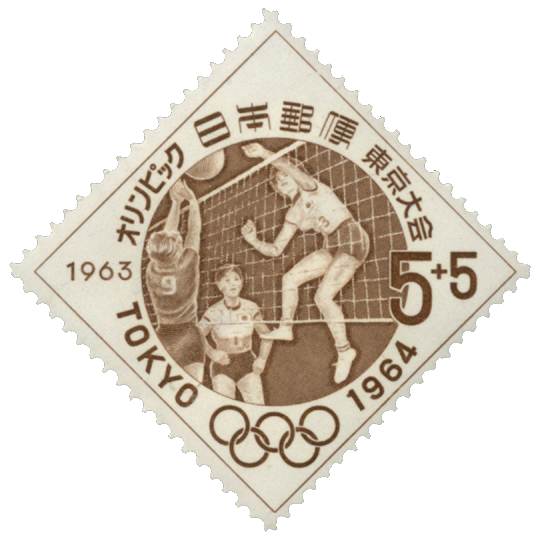
- Pictograms for indoor
- Venue: Yokohama Cultural Gymnasium and Komazawa Volleyball Courts
- Dates: 11 – 23 October 1964
- No. of events: 2
- Competitors: 179 from 11 nations

The 1964 Summer Olympics was the first time that volleyball had been held as an Olympic sport. The sport would feature two medals during this games with the men's and women's indoor teams events. In both tournaments, the format was the same with a single round robin between all of the teams that were competing in the tournament.

In the men's competition, the Soviet Union took out the gold medal as they won eight out of their nine games with the only loss being in Japan who came third. Finishing behind only on sets difference was Czechoslovakia who had only their single loss against the Soviet Union. In the women's competition, Japan won all five of their games to take the gold medal ahead of the Soviet Union and Poland who claimed silver and bronze respectively.

== Medal table ==
Rank	Nation	Gold	Silver	Bronze	Total
1	Soviet Union	1	1	0	2
2	Japan	1	0	1	2
3	Czechoslovakia	0	1	0	1
4	Poland	0	0	1	1
Totals (4 entries)		2	2	2	6

== Medal summary ==
Event	Gold	Silver	Bronze
Men's indoor	Soviet Union; Ivans Bugajenkovs; Nikolay Burobin; Yuri Chesnokov; Vazha K'ach'arava; Valeri Kalachikhin; Vitali Kovalenko; Staņislavs Lugailo; Georgy Mondzolevski; Yuriy Poyarkov; Eduard Sibiryakov; Yury Vengerovsky; Dmitri Voskoboynikov	Czechoslovakia; Milan Čuda; Bohumil Golián; Zdeněk Humhal; Petr Kop; Josef Labuda; Josef Musil; Karel Paulus; Boris Perušič; Pavel Schenk; Václav Šmídl; Josef Šorm; Ladislav Toman	Japan; Yutaka Demachi; Tsutomu Koyama; Sadatoshi Sugahara; Naohiro Ikeda; Yasutaka Sato; Toshiaki Kosedo; Tokihiko Higuchi; Masayuki Minami; Takeshi Tokutomi; Teruhisa Moriyama; Yūzo Nakamura; Katsutoshi Nekoda
Women's indoor	Japan; Masae Kasai (c); Emiko Miyamoto; Kinuko Tanida; Yuriko Handa; Yoshiko Matsumura; Sata Isobe; Katsumi Matsumura; Yoko Shinozaki; Setsuko Sasaki; Yuko Fujimoto; Maseko Kondo; Ayano Shibuki	Soviet Union; Antonina Ryzhova; Astra Biltauer; Ninel Lukanina; Lyudmila Buldakova; Nelli Abramova; Tamara Tikhonina; Valentina Kamenyok-Vinogradova; Inna Ryskal; Marita Katusheva; Tatyana Roshchina; Valentina Mishak; Lyudmila Gureyeva	Poland; Krystyna Czajkowska; Józefa Ledwig; Maria Golimowska; Jadwiga Rutkowska; Danuta Kordaczuk; Krystyna Jakubowska; Jadwiga Książek; Maria Śliwka; Zofia Szczęśniewska; Krystyna Krupa; Hanna Krystyna Busz; Barbara Hermela-Niemczyk

== Gallery ==
1964 Tokyo Olympics Women's Volleyball
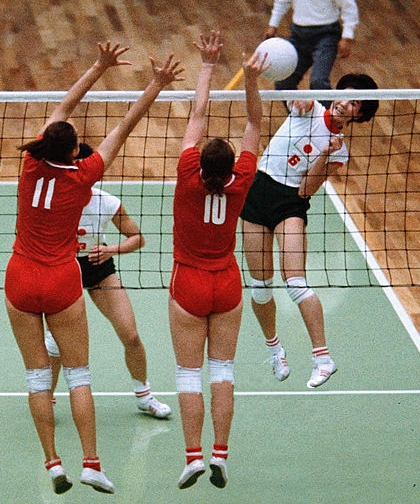
Sata Isobe spiking ball against Soviet Union National Team, 1964 Tokyo Olympics Women's Volleyball
