= Czechoslovakia at the 1964 Summer Olympics =

- IOC code: TCH (CZS used at these Games)
- NOC: Czechoslovak Olympic Committee

in Tokyo
- Competitors: 104 (95 men, 9 women) in 13 sports
- Flag bearer: Karel Klečka (gymnastics)
- Medals Ranked 9th: Gold 5 Silver 6 Bronze 3 Total 14

Summer Olympics appearances (overview)
- 1920; 1924; 1928; 1932; 1936; 1948; 1952; 1956; 1960; 1964; 1968; 1972; 1976; 1980; 1984; 1988; 1992

Other related appearances
- Bohemia (1900–1912); Czech Republic (1994–pres.); Slovakia (1994–pres.)

Czechoslovakia competed at the 1964 Summer Olympics in Tokyo, Japan. 104 competitors, 95 men and 9 women, took part in 64 events in 13 sports. The most successful competitor was Věra Čáslavská (one of only 9 women in crew) with 4 medals - 3 gold and one team silver. Other big surprises were gold medal performances of the cyclist Jiří Daler and weightlifter Hans Zdražila, who broke a world record during his performance. Medal hopes of world record holder athlete Ludvík Daněk were fulfilled with little disappointment, in the form of a silver medal.

== Medalists ==
Medal	Name	Sport	Event
Gold	Věra Čáslavská	Gymnastics	Women's individual all-around
Gold	Věra Čáslavská	Gymnastics	Women's vault
Gold	Věra Čáslavská	Gymnastics	Women's balance beam
Gold	Jiří Daler	Cycling	Men's individual pursuit
Gold	Hans Zdražila	Weightlifting	Men's middleweight
Silver	Josef Odložil	Athletics	Men's 1500 m
Silver	Ludvík Daněk	Athletics	Men's discus throw
Silver	Czechoslovakia national football team: Jan Brumovský; Ludovít Cvetler; Ján Geleta; František Knebort; Karel Knesl; Karel Lichtnégl; Vojtech Masný; Štefan Matlák; Ivan Mráz; Karel Nepomucký; Zdeněk Pičman; František Schmucker; Anton Švajlen; Anton Urban; František Valošek; Josef Vojta; Vladimír Weiss	Football	Men's competition
Silver	Věra Čáslavská; Marianna Krajčírová; Jana Posnerová; Hana Růžičková; Jaroslava Sedláčková; Adolfína Tkačíková	Gymnastics	Women's team all-around
Silver	Czechoslovakia men's national volleyball team: Milan Čuda; Bohumil Golián; Zdeněk Humhal; Petr Kop; Josef Labuda; Josef Musil; Karel Paulus; Boris Perušič; Pavel Schenk; Václav Šmídl; Josef Šorm; Ladislav Toman	Volleyball	Men's tournament
Silver	Jiří Kormaník	Wrestling	Men's Greco-Roman middleweight
Bronze	Lubomír Nácovský	Shooting	Men's 25 m rapid fire pistol
Bronze	Petr Čermák; Jiří Lundák; Jan Mrvík; Július Toček; Josef Věntus; Luděk Pojezný; Bohumil Janoušek; Richard Nový; Miroslav Koníček	Rowing	Men's eight
Bronze	Vladimír Andrs; Pavel Hofmann	Rowing	Men's double sculls

== Cycling ==
Nine cyclists represented Czechoslovakia in 1964.

Individual road race

- Daniel Gráč
- Jiří Daler
- František Řezáč
- Jan Smolík

Sprint

- Ivan Kučírek

1000m time trial

- Jiří Pecka

Tandem

- Karel Paar
- Karel Štark

Individual pursuit

- Jiří Daler

Team pursuit

- Jiří Daler
- Antonín Kříž
- Jiří Pecka
- František Řezáč

== Shooting ==
Four shooters represented Czechoslovakia in 1964. Lubomír Nácovský won a bronze medal in the 25 m pistol event.

25 m pistol

- Lubomír Nácovský
- Ladislav Falta

50 m pistol

- Vladimír Kudrna

300 m rifle, three positions

- Vladimír Stibořík

50 m rifle, three positions

- Vladimír Stibořík

50 m rifle, prone

- Vladimír Stibořík

== Swimming ==
Men

Athlete	Event	Heat		Semifinal		Final	
Athlete	Event	Time	Rank	Time	Rank	Time	Rank
Petr Lohnický	100 m freestyle	56.4	34	Did not advance			
Jindřich Vágner	100 m freestyle	55.5	=11 Q	55.5	=12	Did not advance	
Petr Lohnický	400 m freestyle	4:28.9	18	—N/a		Did not advance	
Petr Lohnický	1500 m freestyle	18:18.4	22	—N/a		Did not advance	
Ivan Ferák	200 m backstroke	2:20.0	18	Did not advance			

== Volleyball ==
=== Men's team competition ===
- Round robin
  - Defeated Hungary (3-2)
  - Defeated Bulgaria (3-2)
  - Defeated Japan (3-1)
  - Defeated United States (3-0)
  - Lost to Soviet Union (2-3)
  - Defeated Brazil (3-0)
  - Defeated Romania (3-1)
  - Defeated Netherlands (3-1)
  - Defeated South Korea (3-1) → Silver Medal
- Team Roster
  - Antonín Procházka
  - Jiří Svoboda
  - Luboš Zajíček
  - Josef Musil
  - Josef Smolka
  - Vladimír Petlák
  - Petr Kop
  - František Sokol
  - Bohunil Golián
  - Zdeněk Groessl
  - Pavel Schenk
  - Drahomír Koudelka
- Head coach: Václav Matiášek
