= 1965 FIVB Volleyball Men's World Cup =

1965 Men's World Cup
Tournament details
- Host country: Poland
- Dates: 13–19 September
- Teams: 11
- Venues: 5 (in 5 host cities)

Final positions
- Champions: Soviet Union (1st title)
- Runners-up: Poland
- Third place: Czechoslovakia
- Fourth place: Japan

The 1965 FIVB Men's World Cup was held from 13 to 19 September in Poland. Eleven nations were involved in the first edition of the competition also known as the "Tournament of the Continents" - ten countries were from Europe, the dominant continent in volleyball at the time. The only team to travel from overseas were Japan.

== Results ==
=== First round ===
==== Pool A ====
Location: Warsaw

Pos	Team	Pld	W	L	Pts	SW	SL	SR	SPW	SPL	SPR	Qualification
1	Soviet Union	3	3	0	6	9	3	3.000	161	0	MAX	Final places
2	Poland	3	2	1	5	8	3	2.667	146	98	1.490	Final places
3	Hungary	3	1	2	4	3	7	0.429	0	142	0.000	7th–11th places
4	France	3	0	3	3	2	9	0.222	108	161	0.671	7th–11th places

Date		Score		Set 1	Set 2	Set 3	Set 4	Set 5	Total
12 Sep	Hungary	3–1	France	15–13	16–14	12–15	15–10		58–52
12 Sep	Soviet Union	3–2	Poland	8–15	15–6	15–13	5–15	15–7	58–56
13 Sep	Soviet Union	3–0	Hungary	15–5?	15–7?	15–8?			45–23?
13 Sep	Poland	3–0	France	15–3	15–5	15–9			45–17
14 Sep	Soviet Union	3–1	France	15–9	15–9	13–15	15–6		58–39
14 Sep	Poland	3–0	Hungary	15–6	15–7	15–10			45–23

==== Pool B ====
Location: Szczecin

Pos	Team	Pld	W	L	Pts	SW	SL	SR	SPW	SPL	SPR	Qualification
1	East Germany	3	2	1	5	7	4	1.750	139	125	1.112	Final places
2	Czechoslovakia	3	2	1	5	7	5	1.400	160	125	1.280	Final places
3	Yugoslavia	3	2	1	5	7	6	1.167	160	169	0.947	7th–11th places
4	Netherlands	3	0	3	3	3	9	0.333	122	162	0.753	7th–11th places

Date		Score		Set 1	Set 2	Set 3	Set 4	Set 5	Total
12 Sep	East Germany	3–0	Netherlands	15–10	15–9	15–3			45–22
12 Sep	Yugoslavia	3–1	Czechoslovakia	8–15	15–12	15–13	15–7		53–47
13 Sep	Czechoslovakia	3–1	Netherlands	15–13	11–15	15–3	15–4		56–35
13 Sep	East Germany	3–1	Yugoslavia	12–15	15–11	15–7	15–13		57–46
14 Sep	Czechoslovakia	3–1	East Germany	15–10	15–13	12–15	15–9		57–37
14 Sep	Yugoslavia	3–2	Netherlands	13–15	16–14	1–15	16–14	15–7	61–65

==== Pool C ====
Location: Mielec

Pos	Team	Pld	W	L	Pts	SW	SL	SR	SPW	SPL	SPR	Qualification
1	Romania	2	2	0	4	6	2	3.000	117	84	1.393	Final places
2	Japan	2	1	1	3	4	5	0.800	98	127	0.772	Final places
3	Bulgaria	2	0	2	2	3	6	0.500	124	128	0.969	7th–11th places

Date		Score		Set 1	Set 2	Set 3	Set 4	Set 5	Total
12 Sep	Romania	3–1	Bulgaria	15–12	14–16	16–14	15–12		60–54
13 Sep	Japan	3–2	Bulgaria	15–11	16–18	6–15	16–14	15–12	68–70
14 Sep	Romania	3–1	Japan	15–4	15–7	12–15	15–4		57–30

=== Final round ===
The results and the points of the matches between the same teams that were already played during the first round are taken into account for the final round.

==== 7th–11th places ====
Location: Kielce

Pos	Team	Pld	W	L	Pts	SW	SL	SR	SPW	SPL	SPR
7	Hungary	4	4	0	8	12	5	2.400	226	183	1.235
8	Yugoslavia	4	3	1	7	10	6	1.667	199	173	1.150
9	Bulgaria	4	2	2	6	8	7	1.143	172	164	1.049
10	Netherlands	4	1	3	5	7	10	0.700	199	213	0.934
11	France	4	0	4	4	3	12	0.250	152	215	0.707

Date		Score		Set 1	Set 2	Set 3	Set 4	Set 5	Total
16 Sep	Yugoslavia	3–1	France	13–15	15–7	15–5	15–7		58–34
16 Sep	Hungary	3–2	Bulgaria	4–15	15–7	11–15	15–6	15–9	60–52
17 Sep	Netherlands	3–1	France	15–9	9–15	15–6	15–13		54–43
17 Sep	Yugoslavia	3–0	Bulgaria	15–7	15–7	15–8			45–22
18 Sep	Hungary	3–1	Yugoslavia	7–15	15–13	15–3	15–4		52–35
18 Sep	Bulgaria	3–1	Netherlands	7–15	15–5	15–2	16–14		53–36
19 Sep	Hungary	3–1	Netherlands	15–9	11–15	15–9	15–11		56–44
19 Sep	Bulgaria	3–0	France	15–7	15–10	15–6			45–23

==== Final places ====
Location: Łódź

Pos	Team	Pld	W	L	Pts	SW	SL	SR	SPW	SPL	SPR
1	Soviet Union	5	4	1	9	14	7	2.000	289	214	1.350
2	Poland	5	4	1	9	14	9	1.556	278	250	1.112
3	Czechoslovakia	5	3	2	8	13	9	1.444	286	243	1.177
4	Japan	5	2	3	7	10	13	0.769	231	296	0.780
5	East Germany	5	1	4	6	7	12	0.583	203	233	0.871
6	Romania	5	1	4	6	5	13	0.385	178	229	0.777

Date		Score		Set 1	Set 2	Set 3	Set 4	Set 5	Total
16 Sep	East Germany	3–0	Romania	15–8	15–10	15–4			45–22
16 Sep	Soviet Union	3–2	Czechoslovakia	16–18	15–6	15–17	15–11	15–5	76–57
16 Sep	Poland	3–2	Japan	15–8	15–9	6–15	8–15	15–4	59–51
17 Sep	Japan	3–2	Soviet Union	15–12	7–15	15–11	2–15	15–12	54–65
17 Sep	Czechoslovakia	3–1	Romania	15–9	15–7	11–15	15–2		56–33
17 Sep	Poland	3–1	East Germany	15–11	15–8	10–15	15–9		55–43
18 Sep	Japan	3–2	East Germany	15–11	15–9	3–15	6–15	15–9	54–59
18 Sep	Poland	3–2	Czechoslovakia	3–15	15–10	7–15	15–11	15–9	55–60
18 Sep	Soviet Union	3–0	Romania	15–7	15–12	15–9			45–28
19 Sep	Czechoslovakia	3–1	Japan	10–15	16–14	15–4	15–9		56–42
19 Sep	Soviet Union	3–0	East Germany	15–3	15–6	15–10			45–19
19 Sep	Poland	3–1	Romania	15–6	8–15	15–8	15–9		53–38

== Final standing ==
Rank	Team
1st place, gold medalist(s)	Soviet Union
2nd place, silver medalist(s)	Poland
3rd place, bronze medalist(s)	Czechoslovakia
4	Japan
5	East Germany
6	Romania
7	Hungary
8	Yugoslavia
9	Bulgaria
10	Netherlands
11	France

1965 Men's World Cup champions

Soviet Union
1st title

Team roster
Valeri Kravchenko, Zhanbek Saurambaev, Yevhen Lapinsky, Viktor Mikhalchuk, Nikolay Burobin, Yury Vengerovsky, Ivans Bugajenkovs, Yuriy Poyarkov, Dmitri Voskoboynikov, Eduard Sibiryakov, Vazha Kacharava, Vladimir Sanakoev
Head coach
Yuri Kleschev
