= Yuri Chesnokov =

Yuri Chesnokov may refer to:

- Yuri Chesnokov (volleyball) (1933–2010), Russian volleyball player
- Yuri Chesnokov (footballer) (1952–1999), Soviet football player
