= Voskoboinikov =

Voskoboinikov or Voskoboynikov (Russian: Воскобойников) is a Russian masculine surname, its feminine counterpart is Voskoboinikova or Voskoboynikova. It may refer to

- Dmitri Voskoboynikov (1941–2001), Russian volleyball player
- Oleg Voskoboynikov (born 1971), Kazakh football player
- Vladimir Voskoboinikov (born 1983), Estonian football player
