= Kim Sung-kil =

Kim Sung-kil may refer to:

- Kim Sung-kil (footballer)
- Kim Sung-kil (volleyball)
