= Tibor Flórián =

Tibor Florian may refer to:

- Tibor Flórián (volleyball) (1938–2008), Hungarian volleyball player
- Tibor Flórián (chess player) (1919–1990), Hungarian chess player
