= Csaba Lantos =

Csaba Lantos may refer to:

- Csaba Lantos (politician)
- Csaba Lantos (volleyball player)
