= Kim In-su =

South Korean volleyball player

Personal information
- Nationality: South Korean
- Born: 18 August 1930 (age 94)

Sport
- Sport: Volleyball

Kim In-su (born 18 August 1930) is a South Korean volleyball player. He competed in the men's tournament at the 1964 Summer Olympics.
