= O Pyeong-gil =

South Korean volleyball player (born 1944)

Personal information
- Nationality: South Korean
- Born: 15 April 1944 (age 80)

Sport
- Sport: Volleyball

O Pyeong-gil (born 15 April 1944) is a South Korean volleyball player. He competed in the men's tournament at the 1964 Summer Olympics.
