= Lee Gyu-so =

South Korean volleyball player (born 1941)

Personal information
- Nationality: South Korean
- Born: 7 July 1941 (age 83)

Sport
- Sport: Volleyball

Lee Gyu-so (born 7 July 1941) is a South Korean volleyball player. He competed in the men's tournament at the 1964 Summer Olympics.
