= Jacques Ewalds =

Dutch volleyball player (born 1940)

Personal information
- Nationality: Dutch
- Born: 28 February 1940 (age 85); Venlo, Netherlands

Sport
- Sport: Volleyball

Jacques Ewalds (born 28 February 1940) is a Dutch volleyball player. He competed in the men's tournament at the 1964 Summer Olympics.
