= Kiril Ivanov =

Bulgarian volleyball player (born 1943)

Personal information
- Nationality: Bulgarian
- Born: 27 May 1943 (age 81)

Sport
- Sport: Volleyball

Kiril Ivanov (Bulgarian: Кирил Иванов; born 27 May 1943) is a Bulgarian volleyball player. He competed in the men's tournament at the 1964 Summer Olympics.
