= 1964 Summer Olympics medal table =

1964 Summer Olympics medals
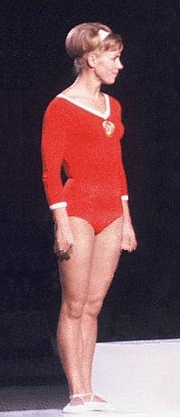
- Larisa Latynina (pictured) won six medals at the 1964 Summer Olympics, the most of any competing athlete.
- Location: Tokyo, Japan

Highlights
- Most gold medals: United States (36)
- Most total medals: Soviet Union (96)
- Medalling NOCs: 41

World map showing the medal achievements of each country during the 1964 Summer Olympics Legend: represents countries that won at least one gold medal. represents countries that won at least one silver medal but no gold medals. represents countries that won at least one bronze medal (no gold or silver). represents participating countries that did not win medals. represents entities that did not participate at the 1964 Summer Olympics.

The 1964 Summer Olympics, officially known as the Games of the XVIII Olympiad, and commonly known as Tokyo 1964, were an international multi-sport event held in Tokyo, Japan, from 9 to 24 October. A total of 5,151 athletes representing 93 National Olympic Committees (NOCs) participated. The games featured 163 events across 19 sports and 24 disciplines. Two new sports were introduced to the Summer Olympic Games program in Tokyo: judo and volleyball. The inclusion of volleyball marked the first time that a women's team sport had been introduced.

The 1964 Summer Games were the first Olympics held in Asia, and marked the first time South Africa was excluded for using its apartheid system in sports. North Korea and Indonesia withdrew their athletes from the 1964 Summer Olympics just before the games were due to start, as the International Olympic Committee (IOC) were refusing to accept any athletes who had participated in the Games of the New Emerging Forces held in Jakarta, Indonesia, in 1963. China continued their boycott of the games, which began in 1952 and lasted until 1984, over the participation of Taiwan.

Overall, 41 teams received at least one medal, with 26 of them winning at least one gold medal. Athletes from the Soviet Union won the most medals overall, with 96, while the United States won the most gold medals, with 36. The Bahamas won their first gold medal ever, doing so in the star class sailing event, while athletes from Kenya, Nigeria, and Tunisia won their nations' first Olympic medals of any kind.

Soviet gymnast Larisa Latynina won the most medals at the games with six (two gold, two silver, and two bronze). With 18 total Olympic medals, Latynina became the world record holder for most Olympic medals won by an individual, a record that stood for 48 years until swimmer Michael Phelps surpassed that mark at the 2012 Summer Olympics. She also became the record holder for most gold and total Olympic medals by a female athlete.

== Medal table ==
The medal table is based on information provided by the IOC and is consistent with IOC conventional sorting in its published medal tables. The table uses the Olympic medal table sorting method. By default, the table is ordered by the number of gold medals the athletes from a nation have won, where a nation is an entity represented by a NOC. The number of silver medals is taken into consideration next and then the number of bronze medals. If teams are still tied, equal ranking is given and they are listed alphabetically by their IOC country code.

At the 1964 Summer Olympics, athletes were tied in three events, all of which were gymnastics events. In the men's artistic individual all-around event there was a three-way tie for second, which resulted in three silver medals and no bronze medal being awarded. In the men's floor event, two silver medals and no bronze medal were awarded due to a tie. Lastly, in the women's vault event, two silver medals and no bronze medal were awarded due to a tie.

* Host nation (Japan)

1964 Summer Olympics medal table
Rank	NOC	Gold	Silver	Bronze	Total
1	United States	36	26	28	90
2	Soviet Union	30	31	35	96
3	Japan*	16	5	8	29
4	United Team of Germany (Note: Athletes from East Germany and West Germany competed together as the United Team of Germany.)	10	22	18	50
5	Italy	10	10	7	27
6	Hungary	10	7	5	22
7	Poland	7	6	10	23
8	Australia	6	2	10	18
9	Czechoslovakia	5	6	3	14
10	Great Britain	4	12	2	18
11	Bulgaria	3	5	2	10
12	Finland	3	0	2	5
12	New Zealand	3	0	2	5
14	Romania	2	4	6	12
15	Netherlands	2	4	4	10
16	Turkey	2	3	1	6
17	Sweden	2	2	4	8
18	Denmark	2	1	3	6
19	Yugoslavia	2	1	2	5
20	Belgium	2	0	1	3
21	France	1	8	6	15
22	Canada	1	2	1	4
22	Switzerland	1	2	1	4
24	Bahamas	1	0	0	1
24	Ethiopia	1	0	0	1
24	India	1	0	0	1
27	South Korea	0	2	1	3
28	Trinidad and Tobago	0	1	2	3
29	Tunisia	0	1	1	2
30	Argentina	0	1	0	1
30	Cuba	0	1	0	1
30	Pakistan	0	1	0	1
30	Philippines	0	1	0	1
34	Iran	0	0	2	2
35	Brazil	0	0	1	1
35	Ghana	0	0	1	1
35	Ireland	0	0	1	1
35	Kenya	0	0	1	1
35	Mexico	0	0	1	1
35	Nigeria	0	0	1	1
35	Uruguay	0	0	1	1
Totals (41 entries)		163	167	174	504

== See also ==
- List of 1964 Summer Olympics medal winners
- All-time Olympic Games medal table
- 1964 Winter Olympics medal table
- 1964 Summer Paralympics medal table
