= Piet Swieter =

Dutch volleyball player (born 1943)

Personal information
- Nationality: Dutch
- Born: 22 April 1943 (age 82); Groningen, Netherlands

Sport
- Sport: Volleyball

Piet Swieter (born 22 April 1943) is a Dutch former volleyball player. He competed in the men's tournament at the 1964 Summer Olympics.
