= Dinco van der Stoep =

Dutch volleyball player

Personal information
- Nationality: Dutch
- Born: 6 April 1939 (age 85); Leiden, Netherlands

Sport
- Sport: Volleyball

Dinco van der Stoep (born 6 April 1939) is a Dutch volleyball player. He competed in the men's tournament at the 1964 Summer Olympics.
