= Jaap Korsloot =

Dutch volleyball player (born 1934)

Personal information
- Nationality: Dutch
- Born: 9 May 1934 (age 90); The Hague, Netherlands

Sport
- Sport: Volleyball

Jacob Gerard "Jaap" Korsloot (born 9 May 1934) is a Dutch volleyball player. He competed in the men's tournament at the 1964 Summer Olympics.
