= Mihai Coste =

Romanian volleyball player

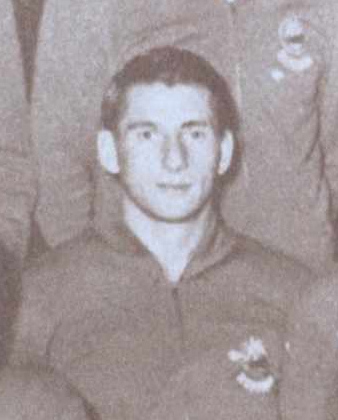
- Coste in 1963

Personal information
- Nationality: Romanian
- Born: 9 December 1938 (age 87) Timișoara, Romania

Sport
- Sport: Volleyball

Mihai Coste (born 9 December 1938) is a Romanian volleyball player. He competed in the men's tournament at the 1964 Summer Olympics.
