= Constantin Ganciu =

Romanian volleyball player

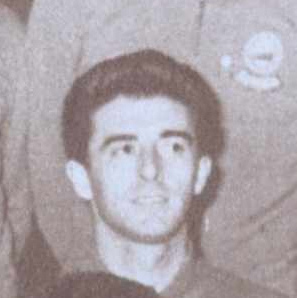
- Ganciu in 1963

Personal information
- Nationality: Romanian
- Born: 17 July 1938 (age 88)

Sport
- Sport: Volleyball

Constantin Ganciu (born 17 July 1938) is a Romanian volleyball player. He competed in the men's tournament at the 1964 Summer Olympics.
