= Petko Pantaleev =

Bulgarian volleyball player

Personal information
- Nationality: Bulgarian
- Born: 6 March 1939 (age 86)

Sport
- Sport: Volleyball

Petko Pantaleev (born 6 March 1939) is a Bulgarian volleyball player. He competed in the men's tournament at the 1964 Summer Olympics.
