= Georgi Konstantinov =

Bulgarian volleyball player

Personal information
- Nationality: Bulgarian
- Born: 4 October 1936 (age 88)

Sport
- Sport: Volleyball

Georgi Konstantinov (Bulgarian: Георги Константинов, born 4 October 1936) is a Bulgarian volleyball player. He competed in the men's tournament at the 1964 Summer Olympics.
