= Nicolae Bărbuță =

Romanian volleyball player (1937–2024)

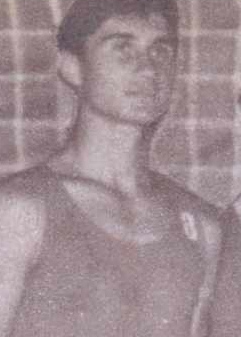
- Nicolae Bărbuță in 1963

Personal information
- Nationality: Romanian
- Born: 4 May 1937
- Died: May 2024 (aged 87)

Sport
- Sport: Volleyball

Nicolae Bărbuță (4 May 1937 – May 2024) was a Romanian volleyball player. He competed in the men's tournament at the 1964 Summer Olympics.
