= Simeon Srandev =

Bulgarian volleyball player

Personal information
- Nationality: Bulgarian
- Born: 10 February 1939 (age 86)

Sport
- Sport: Volleyball

Simeon Srandev (Bulgarian: Симеон Сръндев), born 10 February 1939) is a Bulgarian volleyball player. He competed in the men's tournament at the 1964 Summer Olympics.
