= Georgi Boyadzhiev =

Bulgarian volleyball player (born 1943)

Personal information
- Nationality: Bulgarian
- Born: 18 March 1943 (age 82)

Sport
- Sport: Volleyball

Georgi Boyadzhiev (Bulgarian: Георги Бояджиев, born 18 March 1943) is a Bulgarian volleyball player. He competed in the men's tournament at the 1964 Summer Olympics.
