= Mihai Grigorovici =

Romanian volleyball player

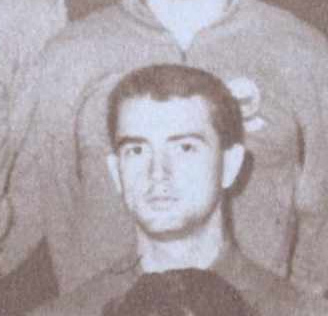

Personal information
- Nationality: Romanian
- Born: 26 December 1937 (age 88)

Sport
- Sport: Volleyball

Mihai Grigorovici (born 26 December 1937) is a Romanian volleyball player. He competed in the men's tournament at the 1964 Summer Olympics.
