= Joop Tinkhof =

Dutch volleyball player

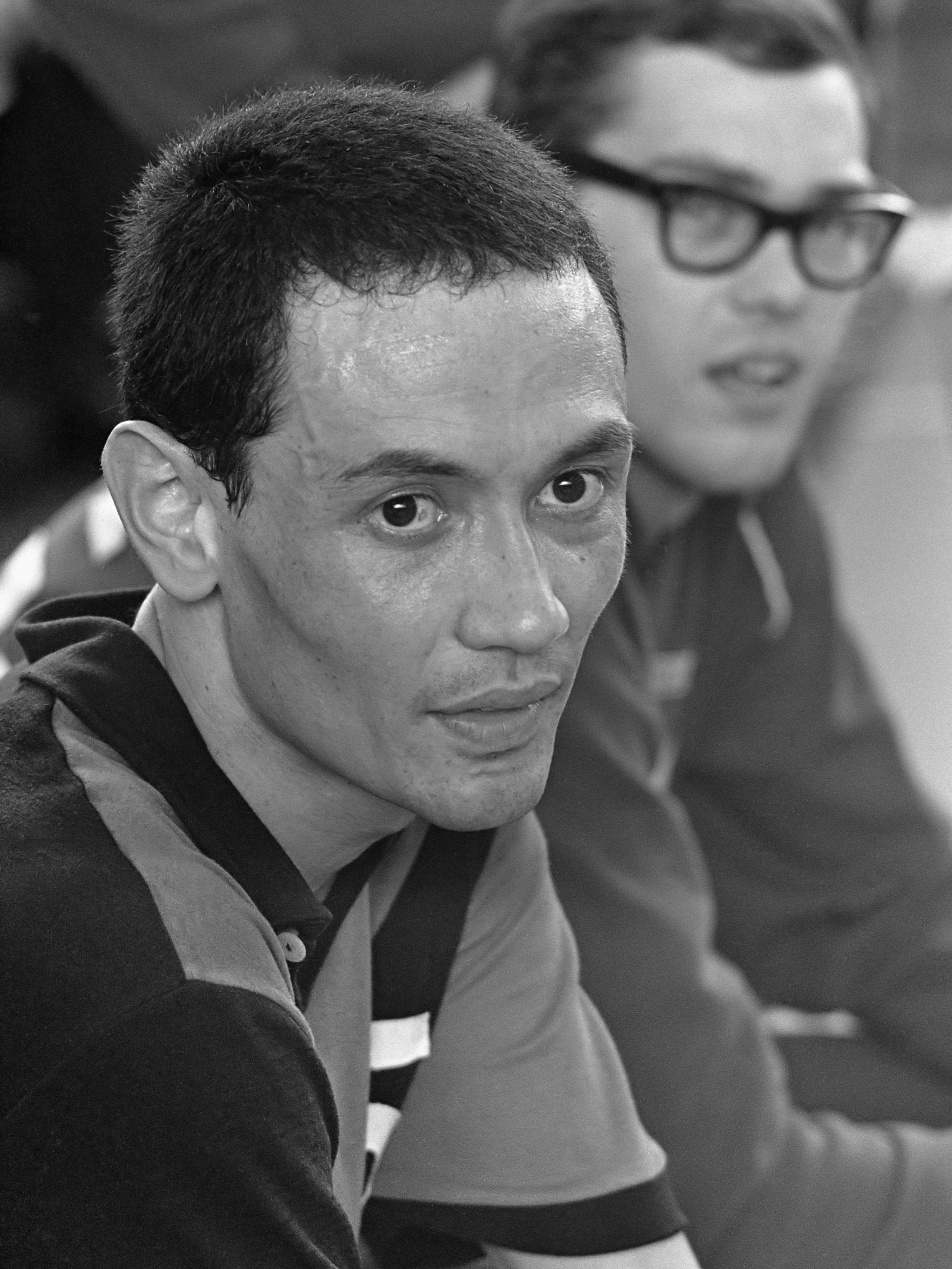
- Joop Tinkhof in 1966

Personal information
- Nationality: Dutch
- Born: 22 March 1938 (age 87); Banda Aceh, Dutch East Indies

Sport
- Sport: Volleyball

Joop Tinkhof (born 22 March 1938) is a Dutch volleyball player. He competed in the men's tournament at the 1964 Summer Olympics.
