= Komazawa Volleyball Courts =

Volleyball venue in Tokyo, Japan

Coordinates: 35.623043°N 139.662867°E

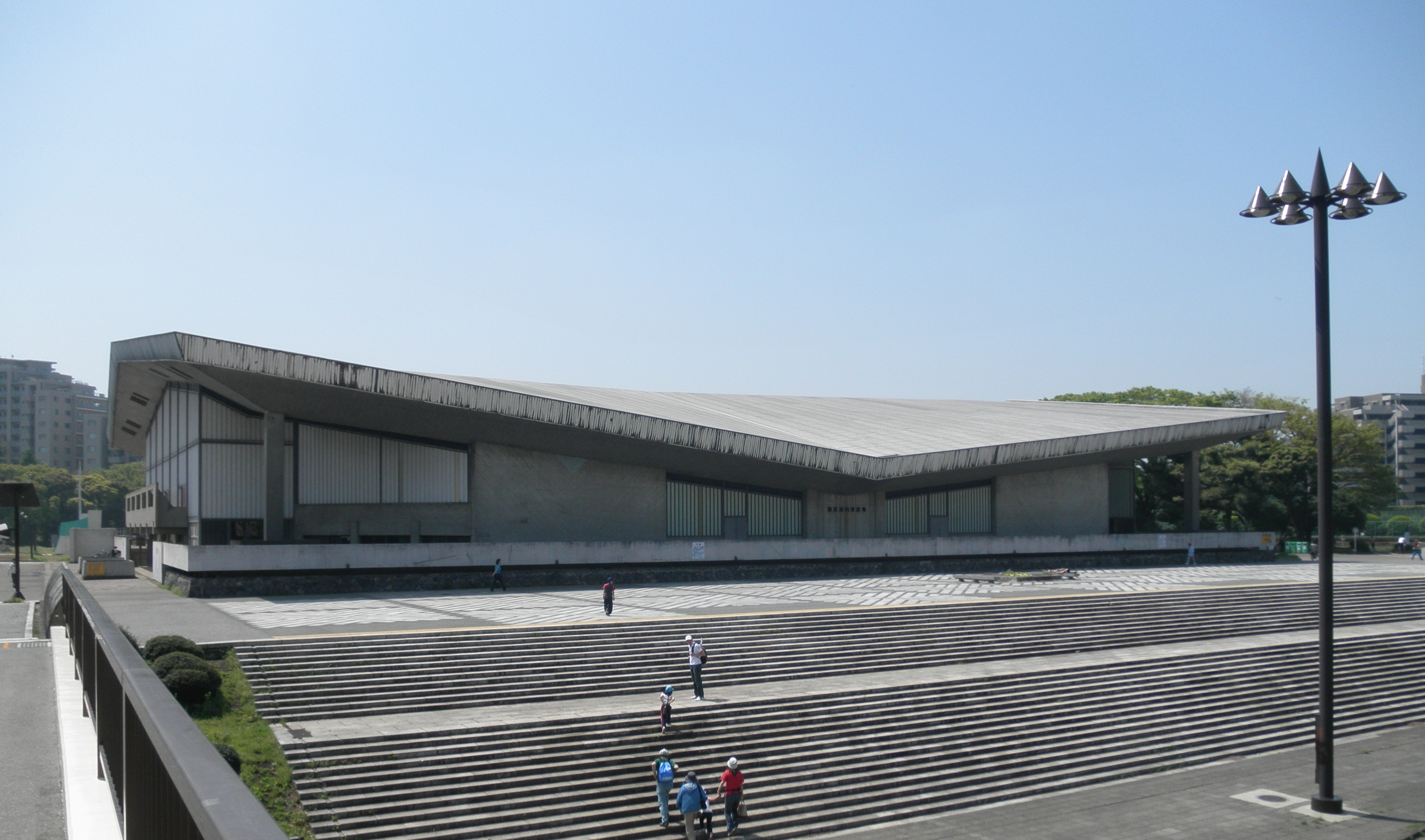
- Interactive map of Komazawa Volleyball Courts

The Komazawa Volleyball Courts are a volleyball venue located in Tokyo, Japan. It hosted some of the volleyball preliminaries for the 1964 Summer Olympics.

Originally an outdoor venue for the 1958 Asian Games, the venue was modified into an indoor arena between December 1962 and June 1964. It seated 3,908 during the Olympics, including 1,300 temporary.
