= Jadwiga Rutkowska =

Polish volleyball player (1934–2004)

Personal information
- Full name: Jadwiga Maria Rutkowska
- Nationality: Polish
- Born: Jadwiga Maria Abisiak; 6 February 1934; Guzów, Poland
- Died: 19 June 2004 (aged 70); Warsaw, Poland

National team
1953–1964	Poland (126)
Medal record
Women's volleyball
Representing Poland
Olympic Games
Bronze medal – third place	1964 Tokyo	Team competition
European Championship
Bronze medal – third place	1955 Romania	Team competition
- Last updated: 26 June 2015

Jadwiga Maria Rutkowska (née Abisiak, later Dobrowolska) (2 February 1934 – 19 June 2004) was a former Polish volleyball player, a member of Poland women's national volleyball team in 1953–1964, a bronze medalist of the Olympic Games Tokyo 1964, a bronze medalist of the European Championship 1955), ten-time Polish Champion.
