= Kim Sung-kil (volleyball) =

South Korean volleyball player (born 1942)

Personal information
- Nationality: South Korean
- Born: 14 January 1942 (age 83)

Sport
- Sport: Volleyball

Kim Sung-kil (born 14 January 1942) is a South Korean volleyball player. He competed in the men's tournament at the 1964 Summer Olympics.
