= Csaba Lantos (volleyball player) =

Hungarian volleyball player (born 1943)

Personal information
- Nationality: Hungarian
- Born: 2 May 1943 (age 81); Baja, Hungary

Sport
- Sport: Volleyball

Csaba Lantos (born 2 May 1943) is a Hungarian volleyball player. He competed in the men's tournament at the 1964 Summer Olympics.
