= Yuri Kleschev =

Personal information
- Full name: Yuri Nikolaevich Kleschev
- Born: 10 November 1930 Moscow, USSR
- Died: 31 May 2005 (aged 74) Moscow, Russia

Volleyball information
- Position: Head coach

Yuri Nikolaevich Kleschev (Russian: Ю́рий Никола́евич Клещёв) was a Soviet volleyball coach, referee, writer, and teacher. He was an Honored Coach of the USSR (1965), a Judge Union category (1971), and an Honored Worker of Physical Culture of the RSFSR (1989).

He was the senior coach of the men's volleyball team of the USSR (1963-1969). The team won the title of Olympic champion twice (1964 and 1968), won the World Cup in 1965, and were the European champions in 1967. They also were bronze medalists of the World Cup in 1969 and 1966, and the European Championships in 1963.

== Biography ==
In 1953, Kleschev graduated from the State Central Order of Lenin Institute of Physical Culture (GTSOLIFK) with a PhD in 1963. His thesis was titled "Organizational and methodological foundations of long-term training teams of higher ranks in volleyball". He was a professor of theory and methodology of volleyball at the Russian State Institute of Physical Culture, Sports and Tourism (RGUFK) in 1984, and a member of the International Academy of Informatics in 1995.

Kleschev is the author of over 100 scientific papers on the subject of volleyball. He prepared 9 PhDs, 30 honored masters of sport, and 10 honored coaches of the USSR and Russia. He was awarded the Order of Friendship of Peoples medal in 1993.

He died in Moscow on 31 May 2005. He was buried in the Novodevichy Cemetery.
