= Georgy Mondzolevski =

Soviet volleyball player (1934–2024)

Personal information
- Full name: Georgy Grigoryevich Mondzolevski
- Nationality: Soviet
- Born: 26 January 1934; Orsha, Byelorussian SSR, Soviet Union
- Died: 28 April 2024 (aged 90)
- Height: 1.72 m (5 ft 8 in)

Volleyball information
- Number: 12

National team
1956–1968	Soviet Union
Honours
Men's volleyball
Representing Soviet Union
Olympic Games
Gold medal – first place	1964 Tokyo	Team
Gold medal – first place	1968 Mexico City	Team
FIVB World Championship
Bronze medal – third place	1956 France	Team
Gold medal – first place	1960 Brazil	Team
Gold medal – first place	1962 Soviet Union	Team
European Championship
Bronze medal – third place	1958 Czechoslovakia	Team
Bronze medal – third place	1963 Romania	Team
Gold medal – first place	1967 Turkey	Team

Georgy Grigorevich Mondzolevski (Russian: Георгий Григорьевич Мондзолевский; 26 January 1934 – 28 April 2024) was a volleyball player who competed for the Soviet Union in the 1964 Summer Olympics and in the 1968 Summer Olympics.

In 2012, Mondzolevski was inducted into the International Volleyball Hall of Fame.

== Volleyball career ==
Mondzolevski won the Soviet championship with Burevestnik Odessa in 1956 and with CSKA Moskva (1958, 1960–1963, 1965, and 1966). Also with CSKA Moskva, he twice won the European Champions’ League title (1960 and 1962). He played in all nine matches during the Soviet team's gold medal performances at the 1964 Summer Olympics and 1968 Summer Olympics. Mondzolevski also won two World Championships with the Soviet team (1960 and 1962), and the European Championships title in 1967.

== Personal life ==
Mondzolevski was Jewish and was born in Orsha. Dr. George Eisen of Nazareth College included Mondzolevski on his list of Jewish Olympic medalists.

After his volleyball career, Mondzolevski taught as a professor at the Moscow State Mining University. He died on 28 April 2024, at the age of 90.

== See also ==
- List of select Jewish volleyball players
