= Tibor Flórián (volleyball) =

Hungarian volleyball player (1938–2008)

Personal information
- Nationality: Hungarian
- Born: 4 February 1938 Budapest, Hungary
- Died: 28 February 2008 (aged 70) Budapest, Hungary

Sport
- Sport: Volleyball

Tibor Flórián (4 February 1938 – 28 February 2008) was a Hungarian volleyball player. He competed in the men's tournament at the 1964 Summer Olympics.
