= Valentina Mishak =

Soviet volleyball player (1942–2022)

Personal information
- Full name: Valentina Grigoryevna Mishak; Valentyna Hryhorivna Myshak
- Nickname: Валентина Григорьевна Мишак
- Nationality: Soviet
- Born: 16 January 1942 Tiraspol, Romania
- Died: 1 September 2022 (aged 80) Odesa, Ukraine

Volleyball information

National team
- Years: Team
- –: Soviet Union
Honours
Women's volleyball
Representing the Soviet Union
Olympic Games
Silver medal – second place	1964 Tokyo	Team competition

Valentina Grigoryevna Mishak (Russian: Валентина Григорьевна Мишак, also Valentyna Hryhorivna Myshak, 16 January 1942 – 1 September 2022) was a Soviet competitive volleyball player and Olympic silver medalist. She began playing volleyball in Tiraspol and later played for Burevestnik Odessa.
