= Ivans Bugajenkovs =

Latvian volleyball player (born 1938)

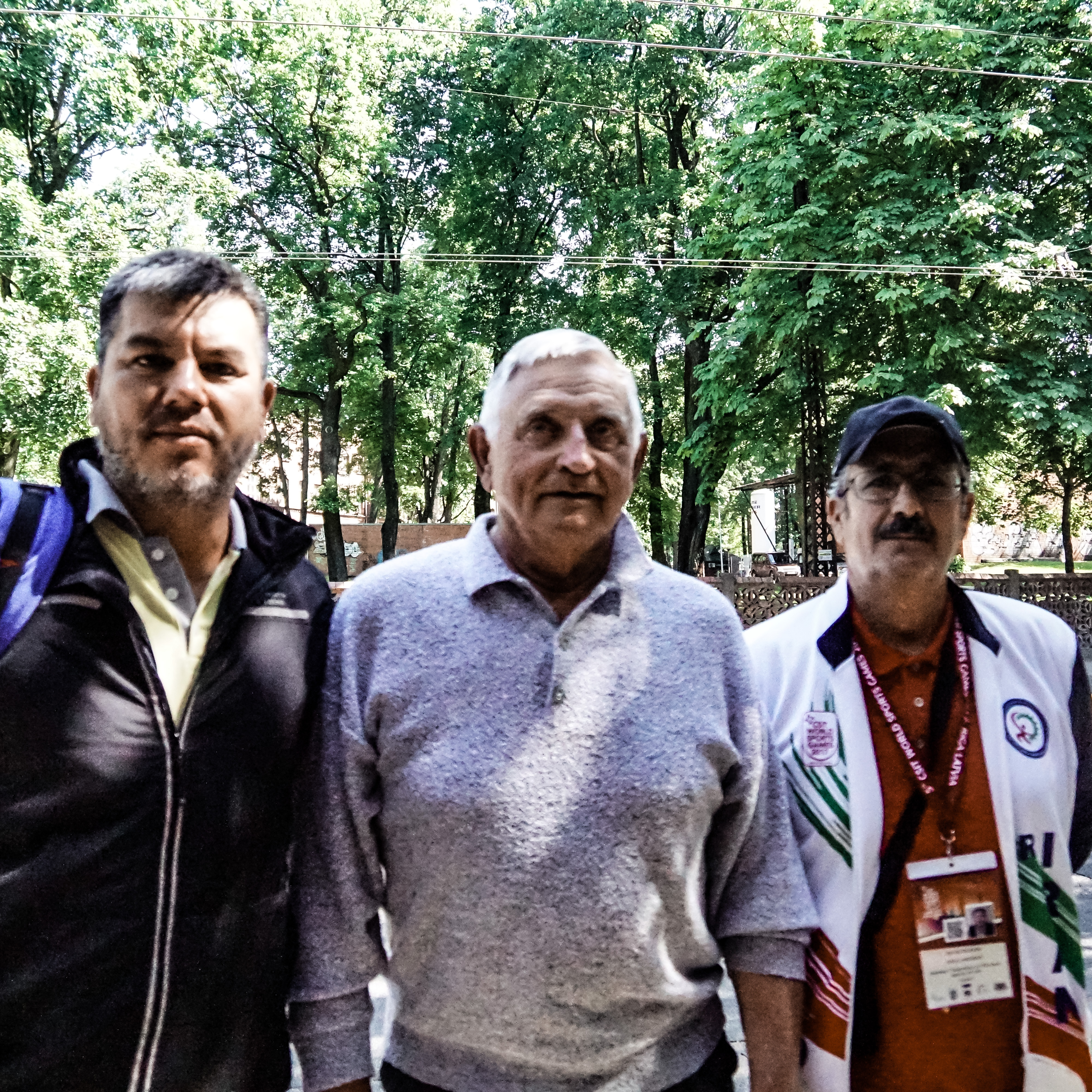

Personal information
- Full name: Ivans Vasiļjevičs Bugajenkovs
- Nationality: Soviet
- Born: 18 February 1938 (age 88); Kumylzhensky District, Russian SFSR, USSR
- Height: 1.82 m (6 ft 0 in)

National team
| 1960–1968 | Soviet Union |
Honours
Men's volleyball
Representing Soviet Union
Olympic Games
| Gold medal – first place | 1964 Tokyo | Team |
| Gold medal – first place | 1968 Mexico City | Team |
World Championship
| Gold medal – first place | 1960 Brazil |
| Gold medal – first place | 1962 Soviet Union |
| Bronze medal – third place | 1966 Czechoslovakia |
European Championship
| Gold medal – first place | 1967 Turkey |
| Bronze medal – third place | 1963 Romania |
- Last updated: 31 December 2017

Ivans Bugajenkovs (born 18 February 1938 in Kumylzhensky District, Volgograd Oblast) is a Latvian former volleyball player who competed for the Soviet Union in the 1964 Summer Olympics and in the 1968 Summer Olympics.

He was born in Burlatskiy, Volgograd Oblast.

== Career ==
In 1964, he was part of the Soviet team that won the gold medal in the Olympic tournament. He played all nine matches. Four years later, he won his second gold medal with the Soviet team in the 1968 Olympic tournament. He played eight matches.

Bugajenkovs worked in Iran for over 16 years, as the general manager of all age groups of Iranian volleyball, from 1991 to 2007.
