= Antonina Ryzhova =

Soviet volleyball player (1934–2020)

Personal information
- Born: 5 July 1934 Moscow, Russian SFSR, Soviet Union
- Died: 1 May 2020 (aged 85)
Medal record
Women's volleyball
Representing Soviet Union
Olympic Games
Silver medal – second place	1964 Tokyo	Team
World Championship
Gold medal – first place	1956 France	Team
Gold medal – first place	1960 Brazil	Team
Silver medal – second place	1962 Soviet Union	Team
European Championship
Gold medal – first place	1958 Czechoslovakia	Team
Gold medal – first place	1963 Romania	Team
Silver medal – second place	1955 Romania	Team

Antonina Alekseyevna Ryzhova (Russian: Антонина Алексеевна Рыжова; 5 July 1934 – 1 May 2020) was a Soviet competitive volleyball player and Olympic silver medalist. She was born in Moscow, Russia.
