= Tatyana Roshchina =

Soviet volleyball player (born 1941)

Personal information
- Native name: Татьяна Александровна Рощина
- Full name: Tatyana Aleksandrovna Roshchina
- Nationality: Russian
- Born: June 23, 1941 (age 85) Moscow, Russian SFSR, Soviet Union
- Height: 1.74 m (5 ft 8 1/2 in)
Medal record
Women's volleyball
Representing the Soviet Union
Olympic Games
Silver medal – second place	1964 Tokyo	Team competition

Tatyana Aleksandrovna Roshchina (Russian: Татьяна Александровна Рощина; born June 23, 1941, in Moscow) is a former Soviet competitive volleyball player and Olympic silver medalist.
