= Astra Biltauere =

Latvian volleyball player (born 1944)

Personal information
- Full name: Astra Biltauere-Rubene
- Born: 9 October 1944 (age 81) Riga, Reichskommissariat Ostland
- Height: 1.68 m (5 ft 6 in)
- Weight: 64 kg (141 lb)
Medal record
Women's volleyball
Representing the Soviet Union
Olympic Games
Silver medal – second place	1964 Tokyo	Team competition

Astra Biltauere (born 9 October 1944) is a former Latvian competitive volleyball player and Olympic silver medalist.
