= Marita Katusheva =

Soviet volleyball player (1938–1992)

Personal information
- Full name: Marita Viktorovna Katusheva
- Nickname: Марита Викторовна Катушева
- Nationality: Russian
- Born: April 19, 1938
- Died: January 21, 1992 (aged 53); Moscow, Russia

National team
Soviet Union
Honours
Women's volleyball
Representing the Soviet Union
Olympic Games
Silver medal – second place	1964 Tokyo	Team competition

Marita Viktorovna Katusheva (Russian: Марита Викторовна Катушева, April 19, 1938 – January 21, 1992) was a Soviet competitive volleyball player and Olympic silver medalist.
