= Ninel Lukanina =

Soviet volleyball player

Personal information
- Nickname: Нинель Васильевна Луканина
- Nationality: Soviet
- Born: September 18, 1937 (age 89); Baku, Azerbaijani SSR, USSR

National team
Soviet Union
Honours
Women's volleyball
Representing the Soviet Union
Olympic Games
Silver medal – second place	1964 Tokyo	Team competition

Ninel Vasilyevna Lukanina (Russian: Нинель Васильевна Луканина, born September 18, 1937) is a former Soviet competitive volleyball player and Olympic silver medalist.
