= Hanna Busz =

Polish volleyball player (born 1940)

Personal information
- Full name: Hanna Busz-Przelaskowska
- Nationality: Polish
- Born: 23 November 1940 (age 85); Poznań, Poland

National team
1962–1968	Poland (41)
Honours
Representing Poland
Women's volleyball
Olympic Games
Bronze medal – third place	1964 Tokyo
- Last updated: 26 June 2015

Hanna Busz-Przelaskowska (born 23 November 1940) is a former Polish volleyball player, a member of Poland women's national volleyball team in 1962–1968, a bronze medalist of the Olympic Games Tokyo 1964, seven-time Polish Champion (1958, 1960, 1962, 1963, 1964, 1965, 1966).
