= Yūzō Nakamura =

Japanese volleyball player (1942–2010)

Yuzo Nakamura
Personal information
- Born: 24 April 1942 Himeji, Hyogo, Japan
- Died: 20 July 2010 (aged 68)

Coaching information
- Previous teams coached
- Years: Teams
- 1977–1979: Japan (men's)
Honours
Men's volleyball
Representing Japan
Olympic Games
Gold medal – first place	1972 Munich	Team
Bronze medal – third place	1964 Tokyo	Team

Yūzō Nakamura (中村 祐造, Nakamura Yūzō; April 24, 1942 – July 20, 2010) was a Japanese volleyball player who competed in the 1964 Summer Olympics and in the 1972 Summer Olympics. He was born in Hyōgo Prefecture.

In 1964, he was a squad member of the Japanese team which won the bronze medal in the Olympic tournament. Eight years later, in 1972, he won the gold medal with the Japanese team in the 1972 Olympic tournament. He played five matches.

Nakamura died at the age of 68 on 20 July 2010 due to thalamic hemorrhage.
