= Ladislav Toman (volleyball) =

Czech volleyball player (1934–2018)

Olympic medal record

Men's Volleyball
Silver medal – second place	1964 Tokyo	Team

Ladislav Toman (13 July 1934 – 10 July 2018) was a Czech volleyball player who competed for Czechoslovakia in the 1964 Summer Olympics. He was born in Prague. In 1964 he was part of the Czechoslovak team which won the silver medal in the Olympic tournament. He played seven matches.

== Honours ==
Czechoslovakia

- European Volleyball Championship (1): 1958
- Summer Olympics runner-up: 1964
- FIVB World Championship runner-up: 1960, 1962
