= Takeshi Tokutomi =

Japanese volleyball player (born 1941)

Olympic medal record

Men's Volleyball
Bronze medal – third place	1964 Tokyo	Team

Takeshi Tokutomi (徳富 斌, Tokutomi Takeshi; born November 13, 1941) is a Japanese former volleyball player who competed in the 1964 Summer Olympics.

In 1964 he was a squad member of the Japanese team which won the bronze medal in the Olympic tournament.
