= Toshiaki Kosedo =

Japanese volleyball player (born 1941)

Olympic medal record

Men's Volleyball
Bronze medal – third place	1964 Tokyo	Team

Toshiaki Kosedo (小瀬戸 俊昭, Kosedo Toshiaki; born May 20, 1941) is a Japanese former volleyball player who competed in the 1964 Summer Olympics. He was born in Hiroshima Prefecture. In 1964 he was part of the Japanese team which won the bronze medal in the Olympic tournament. He played three matches.
