= Josef Musil =

Czech volleyball player (1932–2017)

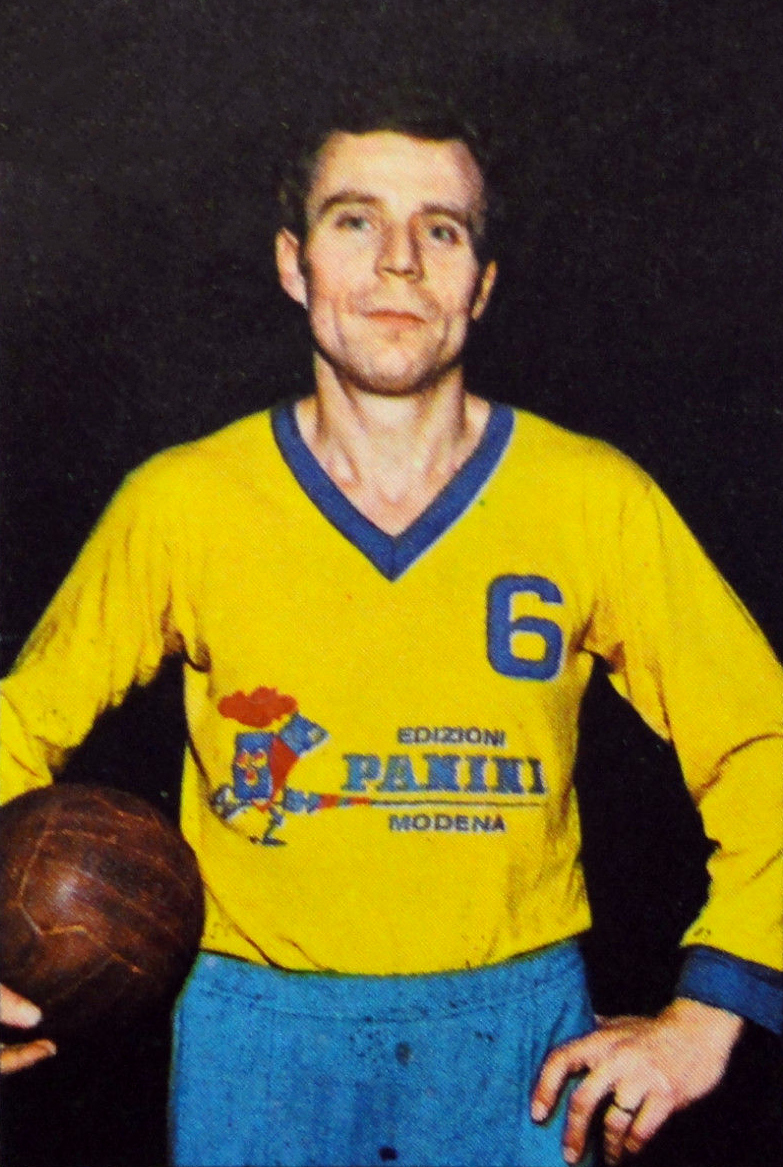
- Musil in 1969

Personal information
- Nickname: Bulda
- Nationality: Czech
- Born: 3 July 1932 Kostelní Lhota, Czechoslovakia
- Died: 26 July 2017 (aged 85) Prague, Czech Republic
- Height: 1.79 m (5 ft 10 in)
- Weight: 79 kg (174 lb)

Sport
- Sport: Volleyball
- Club: Slavia Prague
Medal record
Representing Czechoslovakia
Olympic Games
Silver medal – second place	1964 Tokyo	Team
Bronze medal – third place	1968 Mexico City	Team
World Championship
Gold medal – first place	1956 France	Team
Gold medal – first place	1966 Czechoslovakia	Team
Silver medal – second place	1952 Soviet Union	Team
Silver medal – second place	1960 Brazil	Team
Silver medal – second place	1962 Soviet Union	Team
European Championship
Gold medal – first place	1955 Romania	Team
Gold medal – first place	1958 Czechoslovakia	Team
Silver medal – second place	1967 Turkey	Team

Josef Musil (3 July 1932 – 26 August 2017) was a Czech volleyball player. He won two Olympic medals, in 1964 and 1968, as well as five world and three European championships medals in 1952–1967.
