= Vitali Kovalenko =

Russian volleyball player

Personal information
- Full name: Vitali Aleksandrovich Kovalenko
- Nickname: Виталий Александрович Коваленко
- Nationality: Russian
- Born: 17 March 1934 (age 92) Moscow, Russian SFSR, Soviet Union

Volleyball information

National team
- Years: Team
- –: Soviet Union men's national volleyball team
Honours
Men's volleyball
Representing Soviet Union
Olympic Games
Gold medal – first place	1964 Tokyo	Team

Vitali Aleksandrovich Kovalenko (Russian: Виталий Александрович Коваленко, born 17 March 1934) is a Russian former volleyball player who competed for the Soviet Union in the 1964 Summer Olympics. In 1964 he was part of the Soviet team which won the gold medal in the Olympic tournament. He played five matches.
