= Bohumil Golián =

Slovak volleyball player (1931–2012)

Personal information
- Full name: Bohumil Golián
- Nationality: Slovak
- Born: 25 March 1931; Moštenica, Czechoslovakia
- Died: 11 January 2012 (aged 80); Bratislava, Slovakia
Honours
Men's volleyball
Representing Czechoslovakia
Olympic Games
Silver medal – second place	1964 Tokyo	Team
Bronze medal – third place	1968 Mexico City	Team
World Championship
Gold medal – first place	1956 France	Team
Gold medal – first place	1966 Czechoslovakia	Team
Silver medal – second place	1960 Brazil	Team
Silver medal – second place	1962 Soviet Union	Team
European Championship
Gold medal – first place	1958 Czechoslovakia	Team
Silver medal – second place	1967 Turkey	Team

Bohumil Golián (25 March 1931 – 11 January 2012) was a Slovak volleyball player who competed for Czechoslovakia in the 1964 Summer Olympics and in the 1968 Summer Olympics. He was born in Moštenica and died in Bratislava.

In 1964, he was part of the Czechoslovak team that won the silver medal in the Olympic tournament. He played six matches. Four years later, he won the bronze medal with the Czechoslovak team in the 1968 Olympic tournament. He played seven matches.
