= Yuri Chesnokov (volleyball) =

Russian volleyball player (1933–2010)

Personal information
- Full name: Yuri Borisovich Chesnokov
- Nationality: Russian
- Born: 22 January 1933 Moscow, Russian SFSR, Soviet Union
- Died: 29 May 2010 (aged 77) Moscow, Russia

Sport
- Sport: Volleyball
Medal record
Representing the Soviet Union
Volleyball
Olympic Games
Gold medal – first place	1964 Tokyo	Team competition
FIVB Volleyball Men's World Championship
Gold medal – first place	1960	Team competition
Gold medal – first place	1962	Team competition

Yuri Borisovich Chesnokov (Russian: Юрий Борисович Чесноков; 22 January 1933 – 29 May 2010) was a Russian volleyball player who competed for the Soviet Union in the 1964 Summer Olympics. He was born in Moscow.

Chesnokov was a two-time world champion, having won gold at the 1960 and the 1962 competitions. In 1964, he was part of the Soviet team which won the gold medal in the Olympic tournament. He played eight matches. After his active career, he coached the Soviet team at the 1972 and 1976 Olympics, and later served as a FIVB vice-president for many years. In 2000, he was inducted into the International Volleyball Hall of Fame.
