= Valeri Kalachikhin =

Russian volleyball player (1939–2014)

Personal information
- Full name: Valeri Alexeyevich Kalachikhin
- Nickname: Валерий Алексеевич Калачихин
- Nationality: Russian
- Born: 20 May 1939 Leningradskaya, Krasnodar Krai, Russian SSR, Soviet Union
- Died: 27 November 2014 (aged 75) Rostov-on-Don, Russia

Volleyball information

National team
- Years: Team
- –: Soviet Union men's national volleyball team
Honours
Men's volleyball
Representing Soviet Union
Olympic Games
Gold medal – first place	1964 Tokyo	Team

Valeri Alexeyevich Kalachikhin (Russian: Валерий Алексеевич Калачихин, 20 May 1939 – 27 November 2014) was a Russian volleyball player who competed for the Soviet Union in the 1964 Summer Olympics. He was born in the Sovkhoz Vtoraya Pyatiletka near Leningradskaya, Krasnodar Krai. In 1964, he was part of the Soviet team, which won the gold medal in the Olympic tournament. He played all nine matches.
