= Stanislav Lugailo =

Ukrainian volleyball player (1938–2021)

Personal information
- Nationality: Ukrainian
- Born: 1 January 1938; Sukhumi, Georgian SSR, Soviet Union
- Died: 11 April 2021 (aged 83); Kharkiv, Ukraine

Coaching information
Previous teams coached
Years	Teams
1990–1993	Philippines (women's)

National team
Soviet Union men's national volleyball team
Honours
Men's volleyball
Representing Soviet Union
Olympic Games
Gold medal – first place	1964 Tokyo	Team

Stanislav Lugailo (Ukrainian: Станіслав Антонович Люгайло; 1 January 1938 – 11 April 2021) was a Ukrainian volleyball player who competed for the Soviet Union in the 1964 Summer Olympics.

In 1964, he was a squad member of the Soviet team which won the gold medal in the Olympic tournament.

He also served as head coach of the women's national team of the Philippines from 1990 to 1993.
