= Karel Paulus =

Czech volleyball player (1933–2003)

Olympic medal record

Men's Volleyball
Silver medal – second place	1964 Tokyo	Team

Karel Paulus (3 January 1933 – 31 October 2003) was a Czech volleyball player who competed for Czechoslovakia in the 1964 Summer Olympics.

He was born in Dolní Brusnice, Trutnov District and died in Bílá Třemešná, Trutnov District.

In 1964 he was part of the Czechoslovak team which won the silver medal in the Olympic tournament. He played all nine matches.
