= Yury Vengerovsky =

Ukrainian volleyball player (1938–1998)

Olympic medal record

Men's Volleyball
Gold medal – first place	1964 Tokyo	Team

Yury Naumovich Vengerovsky (Ukrainian: Юрій Наумович Венгеровський, Russian: Юрий Наумович Венгеровский; 26 October 1938 – 4 December 1998) was a Ukrainian volleyball player who competed for the Soviet Union in the 1964 Summer Olympics.

He was Jewish, born in Kharkiv, and died in Belgorod, Russia.

In 1964, he was part of the Soviet team which won the gold medal in the Olympic tournament. He played all nine matches.

He played in Burevetsnik Kharkiv and CSKA Moscow. He retired from playing in 1972, and had a managerial career in "Burevetsnik", CSKA (Rostov-on-Don), Spartak Petropavlovsk-Kamchatsky, Avtomobilist Samara, and VC Belogorie.

== See also ==
- List of select Jewish volleyball players
