= Milan Čuda =

Czech volleyball player (1939–2025)

Olympic medal record

Men's Volleyball
Silver medal – second place	1964 Tokyo	Team

Milan Čuda (22 September 1939 – 20 November 2025) was a Czech volleyball player who competed for Czechoslovakia in the 1964 Summer Olympics. He was part of the Czechoslovak team which won the silver medal in the Olympic tournament. He played two matches. Čuda and his 1964 teammate Boris Perušič are brothers-in-law.

Čuda died on 20 November 2025, at the age of 86.

== Sources ==
- Milan Čuda at Olympedia
- Milan Čuda at Olympics at Sports-Reference.com (archived)
