= Zdeněk Humhal =

Czech volleyball player (1933–2015)

Olympic medal record

Men's Volleyball
Silver medal – second place	1964 Tokyo	Team

Zdeněk Humhal (30 December 1933 – 24 November 2015) was a Czech volleyball player who competed for Czechoslovakia in the 1964 Summer Olympics. He was born in Prague. In 1964, he was part of the Czechoslovak team that won the silver medal in the Olympic tournament. He played eight matches.

== General references ==
- Zdeněk Humhal at Olympics at Sports-Reference.com (archived)
- Zdeněk Humhal at Olympedia
