= Boris Perušič =

Czech volleyball player (born 1940)

Olympic medal record

Men's Volleyball
Silver medal – second place	1964 Tokyo	Team

Boris Perušič (born 27 July 1940 in Zagreb) is a Czech former volleyball player of Croatian descent who competed for Czechoslovakia in the 1964 Summer Olympics.

In 1964 he was part of the Czechoslovak team which won the silver medal in the Olympic tournament. He played eight matches.

Perušič and his 1964 teammate Milan Čuda are brothers-in-law. His grandson is Czech Olympic beach volleyball player Ondřej Perušič.

== General references ==
- Boris Perušič at Olympedia
- Boris Perušič at Olympics at Sports-Reference.com (archived)
