= FIVB Men's Volleyball World Cup =

Volleyball tournament

- Upcoming season or competition: 2027 FIVB Men's Volleyball World Cup
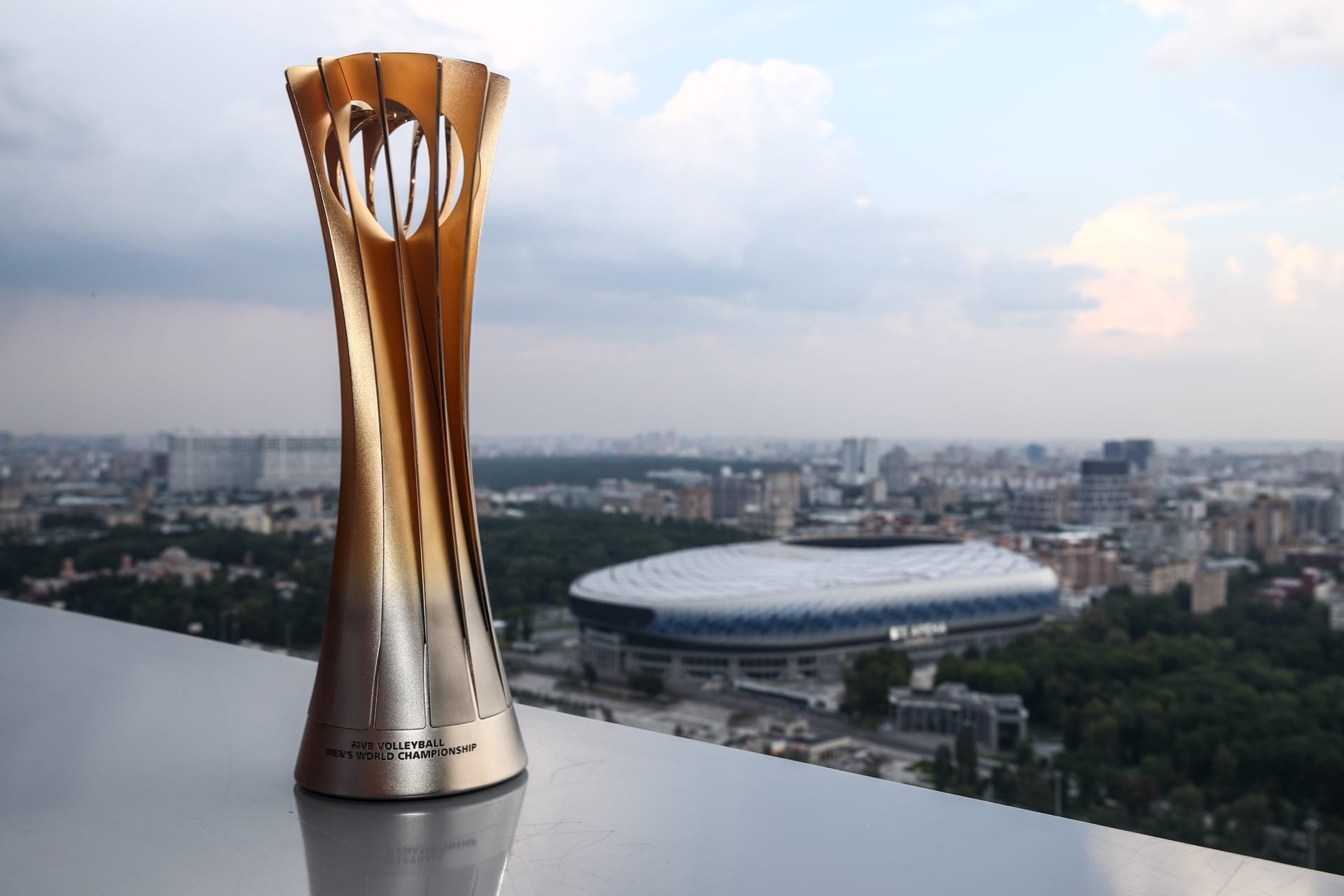
- Formerly: FIVB Men's Volleyball World Championship (1949–2025)
- Sport: Volleyball
- Founded: 1949; 77 years ago
- First season: 1949
- CEO: Ary Graça
- No. of teams: 32 (finals)
- Continent: World (FIVB)
- Most recent champions: Italy (5th title)
- Most titles: Soviet Union (6 titles)
- Streaming partner: VBTV (since 2018)
- Website: en.volleyballworld.com/volleyball/competitions/men-world-championship/

The FIVB Men's Volleyball World Cup, formerly known as the FIVB Men's Volleyball World Championship, is an international volleyball competition contested by the senior men's national teams of the members of Fédération Internationale de Volleyball (FIVB), the sport's global governing body. The initial gap between championships was variable, but since 1962, they were held every four years. The tournament will be held biennially starting in 2025.

The current champion is Italy, who won their fifth title at the 2025 tournament, defeating Bulgaria in the final.

The current format of the competition involves a qualification phase, which currently takes place over the preceding three years, to determine which teams qualify for the tournament phase, which is often called the World Championship Finals. The former format was 24 teams, including the automatically qualifying host nation(s), compete in the tournament phase for the title at venues within the host nation(s) over a period of about a month.

The 21 World Championship tournaments have been won by seven different national teams: the Soviet Union six times; Italy five times; Brazil and Poland three times each; Czechoslovakia twice; and East Germany and the United States, once each.

== History ==
The history of the World Championship goes back to the beginnings of volleyball as a professional, high-level sport. One of the first concrete measures taken by the FIVB after its foundation in 1947 was the establishment of an international competition involving teams from more than one continent. In 1949, the first edition was played in Prague, Czechoslovakia. At that point, the tournament was still restricted to Europe.

Three years later, the event was expanded to include nations from Asia, and began to be held in 4-year cycles. By the following edition, there were also teams from South, Central and North America.

Since volleyball was to be added to the Olympic Program in 1964, the 4-cycles were advanced 2 years after the fourth edition (1960), so that the World Championship may alternate with the Summer Olympic Games. As of 1970, teams from Africa also took part in the competition, and the original goal of having members from all five continental confederations in the games was achieved.

The number of teams involved in the games has changed significantly over the years. Following volleyball's increase in popularity, they rose steadily to over 20 in the 1970s and part of the 1980s, were then cut short to 16 in the 1990s, and finally set up to 24 after 2002. Today, the World Championship is the most comprehensive of all events organized by the FIVB, and arguably the most important, alongside the Olympic Games.

Until 1974, the host nation of the tournament organized both the men's and the women's events, with the single exception of the 1966/1967 games, which took place in different years. Since 1978, this practice has been only occasionally observed, for instance, in 1998 and in the 2006 edition, which was held, as the former was, in Japan.

On 15 October 2022, FIVB announced the expansion of the World Championships and the changes to the competition formula. A total of 32 teams are to compete for future editions of the tournament.

On 22 June 2023, the Volleyball Calendar 2025–2028 approved by FIVB showed that World Championships are to be played biannually in odd years. The first reformed World Championships will be held in 2025 with 32 teams in the new formula.

On 5 March 2026, the tournament was officially renamed the FIVB Volleyball World Cup starting with the 2027 edition. According to the FIVB, this change was intended to align volleyball with the terminology of other major global sporting events and to enhance the tournament's brand recognition.

=== Winners ===
The history of the World Championship clearly demonstrates how volleyball was originally dominated by European nations.

The first two editions were won by the Soviet Union. In 1956, twice runner-up Czechoslovakia took the gold. There followed two more consecutive wins for the Soviet Union, in both cases over Czechoslovakia. The Czechs won a gold medal in the 1966 edition.

In 1970, East Germany prevailed over Bulgaria for their first and only title. In 1974, the Soviet Union threatened to take the lead once more, but ended up being defeated by Poland at the final. Nevertheless, they would confirm their leadership by winning, for the third time, two editions in a row.

1986 saw the first relevant confrontation between United States, the rising major force of the decade, and the traditional leader Soviet Union after the Olympic boycotts of 1980 and 1984. As would be the case two years later at the Seoul Olympic Games, the issue was settled in favour of the Americans led by Karch Kiraly and Steve Timmons. Italy completely dominated the competition in the 1990s, winning all the editions that took place in this decade (1990, 1994, 1998), led by such players as Lorenzo Bernardi and Andrea Giani.

In the 2000s, Brazil became the leading force in the sport, also winning three consecutive editions (2002, 2006 and 2010), the first of which in Buenos Aires, Argentina, the same stage where the Brazilians had been runners-up in 1982. In 2014, hosts Poland defeated Brazil in four sets at the final, achieving their second gold medal and preventing what would have been a historic fourth title in a row. In 2018, Poland won a second consecutive title, again defeating Brazil in the final. In 2022, Poland, playing at home, missed the opportunity to win three consecutive editions by losing in the final to Italy, who won their fourth World title. In 2025, Italy repeated their success by beating Bulgaria in the final match.

As of 2025, 21 editions of the men's Volleyball World Championship have been played: 17 went to European teams, and four to American teams (three times to Brazil and once to the United States).

Total times teams hosted by confederation Confederations and years italicized & in bold have an upcoming competition.
Confederation	Total	(Hosts) Years
AVC (Asia)	4	(Japan) 1998, (Japan) 2006, (Philippines) 2025, (Qatar) **2029**
CAVB (Africa)	0	
CEV (Europe)	14	(Czechoslovakia) 1949, (Soviet Union) 1952, (France) 1956, (Soviet Union) 1962, (Czechoslovakia) 1966, (Bulgaria) 1970, (Italy) 1978, (France) 1986, (Greece) 1994, (Italy) 2010, (Poland) 2014, (Bulgaria) (Italy) 2018, (Poland) (Slovenia) 2022, (Poland) **2027**
CSV (South America)	3	(Brazil) 1960, (Brazil) 1990, (Argentina) 2002
NORCECA (North America)	1	(Mexico) 1974

== Competition formula ==
=== Qualification ===
Previous qualification

Confederation	Slots 2022
CAVB (Africa)	2
AVC (Asia and Oceania)	2
CEV (Europe)	2
NORCECA (North America)	2
CSV (South America)	2
World ranked non-qualified teams	12
Total	24 (22+H+C)

New qualification

Confederation	Slots 2025–
CAVB (Africa)	3
AVC (Asia and Oceania)	3
CEV (Europe)	3
NORCECA (North America)	3
CSV (South America)	3
World ranked non-qualified teams	15
Total	32 (30+H+C)

=== Final tournament ===
The competition formula of the FIVB World Championship has been constantly changed to fit the different number of teams that participate in each edition. The following rules usually apply:

- Twenty-four teams participate in each event.
- Qualification procedures for the World Championship are long and strenuous, lasting over two years.
- Host nations are always pre-qualified.
- The number of spots available per confederation is determined by the FIVB: Europe has usually the highest, and Africa or South America the lowest.
- To participate in the event, a team must survive a number of qualification tournaments depending on its position in the FIVB World Rankings. Low-ranked teams may have to engage in up to three tournaments to be granted a berth; high-ranked teams typically play only one.
- The competition is divided in at least two phases: a preliminary round and a final round. Depending on the number of participating teams, one or more intermediary rounds may also be required.
- In the preliminary round, teams are organized in pools. Each team plays one match against all other teams in its pool.
- When all the matches of the preliminary round have been played, the top n teams in each pool qualify for the following round(s), and the remaining ones leave the competition. The value of n depends on the number of participating teams and the format that will be employed in the finals.
- The FIVB has tried various different formats for the final round(s). For some years now (2004), there seems to be a consensus that at least semifinals and finals must be played according to the Olympic format.
- Quarterfinals may consist of groups of teams playing against each other, or of direct confrontation; in the latter case additional intermediary rounds might be required to reduce the number of surviving teams to eight.
- The tournament now implements a line-up of fourteen players, and four reserve players in case of injuries.

=== New formula ===
A totally brand new competition formula was announced by FIVB. A total of 32 teams will compete in the World Championship. The teams will be divided into 8 groups of 4 teams for the round-robin phase with 2 best teams per group moving into the direct knockout phase: round of 16, quarterfinals, semi-finals and final.

== Results summary ==
#	Year	Host	Final			3rd place match			Teams
#	Year	Host	Champions	Score	Runners-up	3rd place	Score	4th place	Teams
1	1949; Details	Czechoslovakia	Soviet Union	Round-robin (3–1)	Czechoslovakia	Bulgaria	Round-robin (3–1)	Romania	10
2	1952; Details	Soviet Union	Soviet Union	Round-robin (3–0)	Czechoslovakia	Bulgaria	Round-robin (3–1)	Romania	11
3	1956; Details	France	Czechoslovakia	Round-robin (3–2)	Romania	Soviet Union	Round-robin (3–1)	Poland	24
4	1960; Details	Brazil	Soviet Union	Round-robin (3–0)	Czechoslovakia	Romania	Round-robin (3–1)	Poland	14
5	1962; Details	Soviet Union	Soviet Union	Round-robin (3–0)	Czechoslovakia	Romania	Round-robin (2–3)	Bulgaria	21
6	1966; Details	Czechoslovakia	Czechoslovakia	Round-robin (3–1)	Romania	Soviet Union	Round-robin (3–0)	East Germany	22
7	1970; Details	Bulgaria	East Germany	Round-robin (3–2)	Bulgaria	Japan	Round-robin (3–0)	Czechoslovakia	24
8	1974; Details	Mexico	Poland	Round-robin (3–2)	Soviet Union	Japan	Round-robin (3–1)	East Germany	24
9	1978; Details	Italy	Soviet Union	3–0	Italy	Cuba	3–1	South Korea	24
10	1982; Details	Argentina	Soviet Union	3–0	Brazil	Argentina	3–0	Japan	24
11	1986; Details	France	United States	3–1	Soviet Union	Bulgaria	3–0	Brazil	16
12	1990; Details	Brazil	Italy	3–1	Cuba	Soviet Union	3–0	Brazil	16
13	1994; Details	Greece	Italy	3–1	Netherlands	United States	3–1	Cuba	16
14	1998; Details	Japan	Italy	3–0	FR Yugoslavia	Cuba	3–1	Brazil	24
15	2002; Details	Argentina	Brazil	3–2	Russia	France	3–0	FR Yugoslavia	24
16	2006; Details	Japan	Brazil	3–0	Poland	Bulgaria	3–1	Serbia and Montenegro	24
17	2010; Details	Italy	Brazil	3–0	Cuba	Serbia	3–1	Italy	24
18	2014; Details	Poland	Poland	3–1	Brazil	Germany	3–0	France	24
19	2018; Details	Italy / Bulgaria	Poland	3–0	Brazil	United States	3–1	Serbia	24
20	2022; Details	Poland / Slovenia	Italy	3–1	Poland	Brazil	3–1	Slovenia	24
21	2025; Details	Philippines	Italy	3–1	Bulgaria	Poland	3–1	Czech Republic	32
22	2027; Details	Poland		–			–		32
23	2029; Details	Qatar		–			–		32

== Medals summary ==
Rank	Nation	Gold	Silver	Bronze	Total
1	Soviet Union	6	2	3	11
2	Italy	5	1	0	6
3	Brazil	3	3	1	7
4	Poland	3	2	1	6
5	Czechoslovakia	2	4	0	6
6	United States	1	0	2	3
7	East Germany	1	0	0	1
8	Bulgaria	0	2	4	6
9	Cuba	0	2	2	4
9	Romania	0	2	2	4
11	FR Yugoslavia	0	1	0	1
11	Netherlands	0	1	0	1
11	Russia	0	1	0	1
14	Japan	0	0	2	2
15	Argentina	0	0	1	1
15	France	0	0	1	1
15	Germany	0	0	1	1
15	Serbia	0	0	1	1
Totals (18 entries)		21	21	21	63

== Hosts ==
List of hosts by number of championships hosted.

Times hosted	Nations	Year(s)
3	Italy	1978, 2010, 2018*
3	Poland	2014, 2022*, 2027
2	Argentina	1982, 2002
2	Brazil	1960, 1990
2	Bulgaria	1970, 2018*
2	Czechoslovakia	1949, 1966
2	France	1956, 1986
2	Japan	1998, 2006
2	Soviet Union	1952, 1962
1	Greece	1994
1	Mexico	1974
1	Philippines	2025
1	Qatar	2029
1	Slovenia	2022*

* = co-hosts.

== MVP by edition ==
- 1949–66 – Not awarded
- 1970 – Rudi Schumann (GDR)
- 1974 – Stanisław Gościniak (POL)
- 1978 – Not awarded
- 1982 – Vyacheslav Zaytsev (USSR)
- 1986 – Philippe Blain (FRA)
- 1990 – Andrea Lucchetta (ITA)
- 1994 – Lorenzo Bernardi (ITA)
- 1998 – Rafael Pascual (ESP)
- 2002 – Marcos Milinkovic (ARG)
- 2006 – Gilberto Godoy Filho (BRA)
- 2010 – Murilo Endres (BRA)
- 2014 – Mariusz Wlazły (POL)
- 2018 – Bartosz Kurek (POL)
- 2022 – Simone Giannelli (ITA)
- 2025 – Alessandro Michieletto (ITA)

== Most successful players ==
Boldface denotes active volleyball players and highest medal count among all players (including these who not included in these tables) per type.

=== Multiple gold medalists ===
Rank	Player	Country	From	To	Gold	Silver	Bronze	Total
1	Marco Bracci	Italy	1990	1998	**3**	–	–	3
1	Dante Amaral	Brazil	2002	2010	**3**	–	–	3
1	Ferdinando De Giorgi	Italy	1990	1998	**3**	–	–	3
1	Andrea Gardini	Italy	1990	1998	**3**	–	–	3
1	Andrea Giani	Italy	1990	1998	**3**	–	–	3
1	Gilberto "Giba" Godoy Filho	Brazil	2002	2010	**3**	–	–	3
1	Rodrigo Santana	Brazil	2002	2010	**3**	–	–	3
8	Josef Musil	Czechoslovakia	1952	1966	2	**3**	–	**5**
9	Bohumil Golián	Czechoslovakia	1956	1966	2	2	–	4
9	Vyacheslav Zaytsev	Soviet Union	1974	1986	2	2	–	4

=== Multiple medalists ===
The table shows players who have won at least 4 medals in total at the World Championships.

Rank	Player	Country	From	To	Gold	Silver	Bronze	Total
1	Josef Musil	Czechoslovakia	1952	1966	2	**3**	–	**5**
2	Bohumil Golián	Czechoslovakia	1956	1966	2	2	–	4
2	Vyacheslav Zaytsev	Soviet Union	1974	1986	2	2	–	4
4	Jaromír Paldus	Czechoslovakia	1949	1960	1	**3**	–	4
5	**Bruno Rezende**	Brazil	2010	2022	1	2	1	4
5	**Lucas Saatkamp**	Brazil	2010	2022	1	2	1	4
7	Gheorghe Corbeanu	Romania	1956	1966	–	2	**2**	4
7	Eduard Derzsei	Romania	1956	1966	–	2	**2**	4
7	Horaţiu Nicolau	Romania	1956	1966	–	2	**2**	4

== See also ==
- Volleyball at the Summer Olympics
- FIVB Women's Volleyball World Cup
- FIVB Volleyball World Grand Champions Cup
- FIVB Volleyball World League
- FIVB Men's Volleyball Nations League
- FIVB Volleyball Men's U23 World Championship
- FIVB Volleyball Men's U21 World Championship
- FIVB Volleyball Boys' U19 World Championship
- List of indoor volleyball world medalists
