= Josef Šorm =

Czech volleyball player (1932–2022)

Olympic medal record

Men's Volleyball
Silver medal – second place	1964 Tokyo	Team

Josef Šorm (2 March 1932 – 11 May 2022) was a Czech volleyball player who competed for Czechoslovakia in the 1964 Summer Olympics.

He was born in Dvůr Králové nad Labem.

In 1964 he was part of the Czechoslovak team which won the silver medal in the Olympic tournament. He played eight matches.
