= Vazha Kacharava =

Georgian volleyball player (born 1937)

Personal information
- Nationality: Georgian
- Born: January 2, 1937 (age 89) Tbilisi, Georgian SSR, Soviet Union

Volleyball information

National team
- Years: Team
- –: Soviet Union men's national volleyball team
Honours
Men's volleyball
Representing Soviet Union
Olympic Games
Gold medal – first place	1964 Tokyo	Team

Vazha K'ach'arava (Georgian: ვაჟა კაჭარავა, born January 2, 1937) is a Georgian former volleyball player who competed for the Soviet Union in the 1964 Summer Olympics.

He was born in Tbilisi.

In 1964 he was part of the Soviet team which won the gold medal in the Olympic tournament. He played seven matches.
