= Josef Labuda =

Slovak volleyball player (born 1941)

Olympic medal record

Men's Volleyball
Silver medal – second place	1964 Tokyo	Team

Josef Labuda (born 13 December 1941) is a Slovak former volleyball player who competed for Czechoslovakia in the 1964 Summer Olympics.

He was born in Bratislava.

In 1964 he was a squad member of the Czechoslovak team which won the silver medal in the Olympic tournament.
