= 1967 Men's European Volleyball Championship =

Tournament details
- Host country: Turkey
- Dates: October 26–November 8
- Teams: 20
- Venues: 4 (in 4 host cities)

Final positions
- Champions: Soviet Union (3rd title)

The 1967 Men's European Volleyball Championship, the seventh edition of the event, was organized by Europe's governing volleyball body, the Confédération Européenne de Volleyball. It was hosted in Istanbul, Ankara, İzmir and Adana, Turkey from October 26 to November 8, 1967.

== Teams ==
- Albania
- Austria
- Belgium
- Bulgaria
- Czechoslovakia
- Finland
- France
- Greece
- East Germany
- West Germany
- Israel
- Italy
- Yugoslavia
- Netherlands
- Poland
- Romania
- Sweden
- Turkey
- Hungary
- USSR

== Final ranking ==
Place	Team
1st place, gold medalist(s)	Soviet Union
2nd place, silver medalist(s)	Czechoslovakia
3rd place, bronze medalist(s)	Poland
4.	East Germany
5.	Romania
6.	Hungary
7.	Yugoslavia
8.	Italy
9.	Bulgaria
10.	France
11.	Israel
12.	Belgium
13.	Albania
14.	Turkey
15.	Netherlands
16.	Sweden
17.	Finland
18.	West Germany
19.	Austria
20.	Greece

1967 Men's European champions

Soviet Union
Third title
