= Václav Šmídl =

Czech volleyball player (born 1940)

Olympic medal record

Men's Volleyball
Silver medal – second place	1964 Tokyo	Team

Václav Šmídl (born 18 March 1940) is a Czech former volleyball player who competed for Czechoslovakia in the 1964 Summer Olympics.

He was born in Prague.

In 1964 he was part of the Czechoslovak team which won the silver medal in the Olympic tournament. He played six matches.
