= Petr Kop =

Czech volleyball player (1937–2017)

Peter Kop

Personal information
- Nationality: Czech
- Born: 15 February 1937; Prague, Czechoslovakia
- Died: 27 January 2017 (aged 79); Prague, Czech Republic
- Height: 179 cm (5 ft 10 in)
Honours
Men's Volleyball
Silver medal – second place	1964 Tokyo	Team
Bronze medal – third place	1968 Mexico City	Team

Petr Kop (15 February 1937 – 27 January 2017) was a Czech volleyball player who competed for Czechoslovakia in the 1964 Summer Olympics and in the 1968 Summer Olympics. He was born in Prague.

In 1964, Kop was part of the Czechoslovak team that won the silver medal in the Olympic tournament. He played in six matches.

Four years later, Kop won the bronze medal with the Czechoslovak team in the 1968 Olympic tournament. He played in seven matches.

Kop played in the Italian volleyball league for Virtus Pallavolo Bologna.
