= Yuriy Poyarkov =

Ukrainian volleyball player (1937–2017)

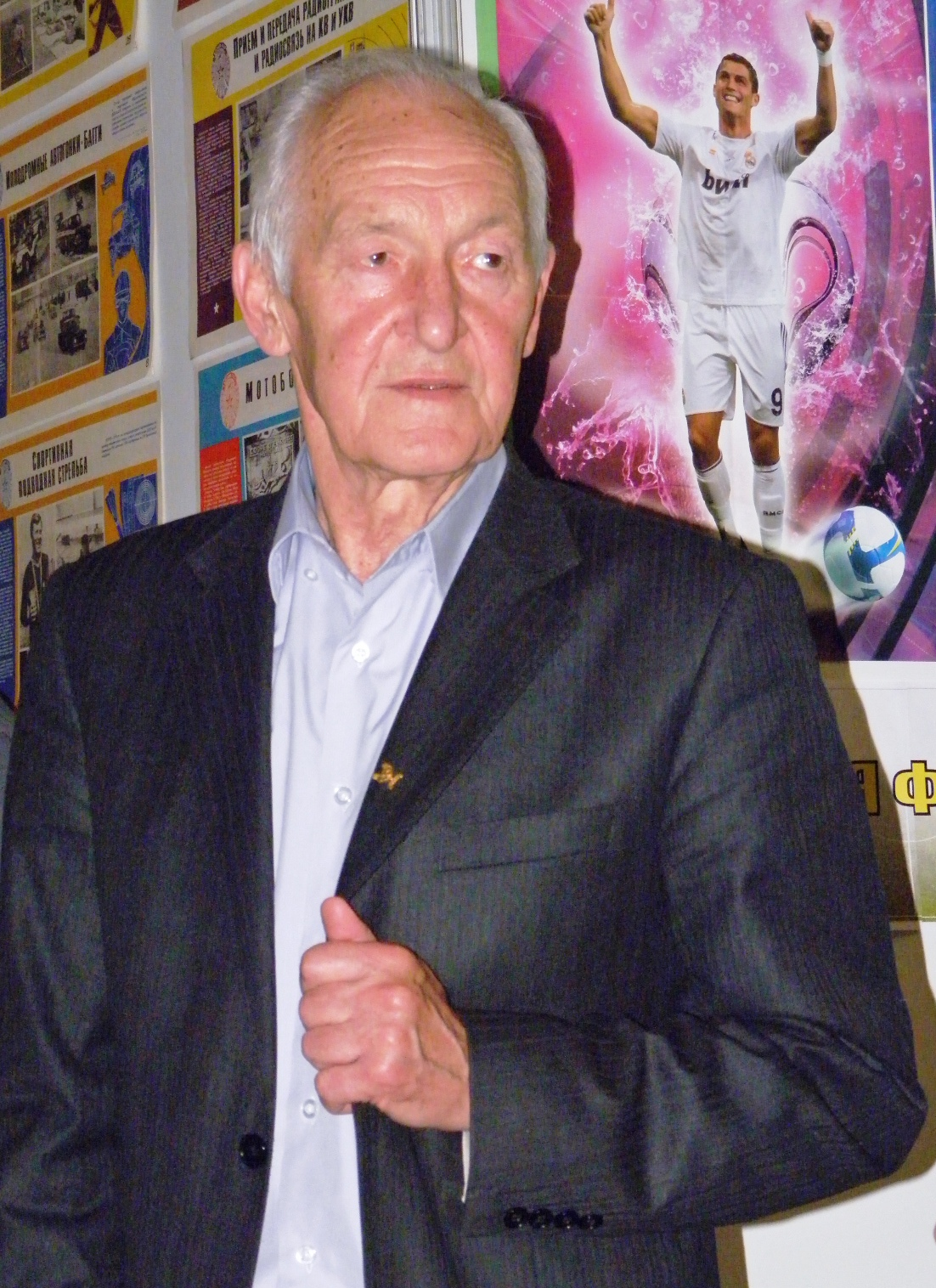
- Poyarkov in 2012

Personal information
- Full name: Yuriy Mikhaylovich Poyarkov
- Nickname: Юрій Михайлович Поярков
- Nationality: Ukrainian
- Born: 10 February 1937 Kharkiv, Ukrainian SSR, Soviet Union
- Died: 10 February 2017 (aged 80) Kharkiv, Ukraine

Volleyball information

National team
- Years: Team
- –: Soviet Union
Honours
Men's volleyball
Representing Soviet Union
Olympic Games
Gold medal – first place	1964 Tokyo	Team
Gold medal – first place	1968 Mexico City	Team
Bronze medal – third place	1972 Munich	Team

Yuriy Mikhaylovich Poyarkov (Ukrainian: Юрій Михайлович Поярков; 10 February 1937, in Kharkiv – 10 February 2017, in Kharkiv) was a Ukrainian volleyball player who competed for the Soviet Union in the 1964 Summer Olympics, in the 1968 Summer Olympics, and in the 1972 Summer Olympics.

== Career ==
In 1964, Poyarkov was part of the Soviet team which won the gold medal in the Olympic tournament. He played eight matches.

Four years later, Poyarkov won his second gold medal with the Soviet team in the 1968 Olympic Games tournament. He played all nine matches.

At the 1972 Olympic Games, Poyarkov was a member of the Soviet team that won the bronze medal in the Olympic tournament. He played three matches.

Poyarkov died on his 80th birthday, on 10 February 2017.
