= Nikolay Burobin =

Russian volleyball player

Personal information
- Full name: Nikolay Aleksandrovich Burobin
- Nationality: Soviet
- Born: May 25, 1937 (age 89); Moscow, Russia, USSR

National team
Soviet Union
Honours
Men's volleyball
Representing Soviet Union
Olympic Games
Gold medal – first place	1964 Tokyo	Team
- Last updated: 31 December 2017

Nikolay Aleksandrovich Burobin (Russian: Николай Александрович Буробин, born May 25, 1937) is a Russian former volleyball player who competed for the Soviet Union in the 1964 Summer Olympics.

He was born in Pushkino, Moscow Oblast.

In 1964, he was part of the Soviet team which won the gold medal in the Olympic tournament. He played eight matches.
