= Eduard Sibiryakov =

Soviet volleyball player (1941–2004)

Personal information
- Full name: Eduard Fyodorovich Sibiryakov
- Nickname: Эдуард Фёдорович Сибиряков
- Nationality: Russian
- Born: 27 November 1941; Chelyabinsk, Russian SFSR, Soviet Union
- Died: 4 January 2004 (aged 62); Moscow, Russia

National team
Soviet Union
Honours
Men's volleyball
Representing Soviet Union
Olympic Games
Gold medal – first place	1964 Tokyo	Team
Gold medal – first place	1968 Mexico City	Team

Eduard Fyodorovich Sibiryakov (Russian: Эдуард Фёдорович Сибиряков; 27 November 1941 – 4 January 2004) was a Russian former volleyball player who competed for the Soviet Union in the 1964 Summer Olympics and in the 1968 Summer Olympics.

He was born in Chelyabinsk and died in Moscow.

In 1964, he was part of the Soviet team which won the gold medal in the Olympic tournament. He played two matches.

Four years later, in 1968, he won his second gold medal with the Soviet team in the 1968 Olympic tournament. He played all nine matches.
