= Dmitri Voskoboynikov =

Soviet volleyball player (1941–2001)

Olympic medal record

Men's Volleyball
Gold medal – first place	1964 Tokyo	Team

Dmitri Vyacheslavovich Voskoboynikov (Russian: Дмитрий Вячеславович Воскобойников, March 6, 1941 – December 2, 2001) was a Russian former volleyball player who competed for the Soviet Union in the 1964 Summer Olympics.

He was born in Moscow.

In 1964, he was part of the Soviet team which won the gold medal in the Olympic tournament. He played seven matches.
