= Volleyball at the 1964 Summer Olympics – Men's tournament =

Men's volleyball at the Games of the XVIII Olympiad
- Venue: Yokohama Cultural Gymnasium and Komazawa Volleyball Courts
- Date: 13–23 October
- Competitors: 120 from 10 nations

Medalists
1st place, gold medalist(s)		Soviet Union (1st title)
2nd place, silver medalist(s)		Czechoslovakia
3rd place, bronze medalist(s)		Japan

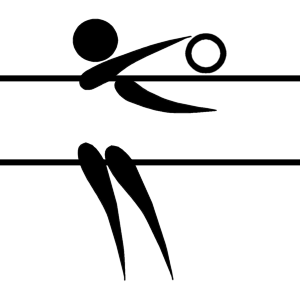

The men's tournament in volleyball at the 1964 Summer Olympics was the first edition of the event at the Summer Olympics, organized by the world's governing body, the FIVB in conjunction with the IOC. It was held in Yokohama and Tokyo, Japan from 13 to 23 October 1964.

== Qualification ==
Means of qualification		Date	Host	Vacancies	Qualified
Host Country		26 May 1959	(West Germany) Munich	1	Japan
1962 World Championship		13–26 October 1962	Soviet Union	4	Soviet Union
1962 World Championship		13–26 October 1962	Soviet Union	4	Czechoslovakia
1962 World Championship		13–26 October 1962	Soviet Union	4	Romania
1962 World Championship		13–26 October 1962	Soviet Union	4	Bulgaria
African Qualifier		December 1963	(United Arab Republic) Alexandria	1	~~Morocco*~~
Asian Qualifier		22–30 December 1963	(India) New Delhi	1	South Korea
1963 European Championship		21 October – 2 November 1963	Romania	1	Hungary
1963 Pan American Games	for NORCECA	21 April – 3 May 1963	(Brazil) São Paulo	1	United States
1963 Pan American Games	for Volleysur	21 April – 3 May 1963	(Brazil) São Paulo	1	Brazil
European Qualifier		January 1964	(Belgium) Brussels	1	Netherlands
Total				10	

* Morocco withdrew and were replaced by Bulgaria.

== Venues ==
Main venue	Sub venue
Yokohama, Japan	Tokyo, Japan
Yokohama Cultural Gymnasium	Komazawa Volleyball Courts
Capacity: 5,000	Capacity: 3,908
	No Image

== Round robin ==
Pos	Team	Pld	W	L	Pts	SW	SL	SR	SPW	SPL	SPR
1	Soviet Union	9	8	1	17	25	5	5.000	415	279	1.487
2	Czechoslovakia	9	8	1	17	26	10	2.600	486	399	1.218
3	Japan	9	7	2	16	22	12	1.833	475	372	1.277
4	Romania	9	6	3	15	19	15	1.267	432	394	1.096
5	Bulgaria	9	5	4	14	20	16	1.250	464	429	1.082
6	Hungary	9	4	5	13	18	18	1.000	449	466	0.964
7	Brazil	9	3	6	12	13	23	0.565	410	474	0.865
8	Netherlands	9	2	7	11	11	24	0.458	378	482	0.784
9	United States	9	2	7	11	10	23	0.435	360	450	0.800
10	South Korea	9	0	9	9	9	27	0.333	376	500	0.752

Date		Score		Set 1	Set 2	Set 3	Set 4	Set 5	Total
13 Oct	United States	3–0	Netherlands	15–10	15–13	15–6			45–29
13 Oct	Czechoslovakia	3–2	Hungary	15–10	12–15	13–15	15–9	15–10	70–59
13 Oct	Soviet Union	3–0	Romania	15–8	15–10	15–9			45–27
13 Oct	Japan	3–0	South Korea	17–15	15–8	15–3			47–26
13 Oct	Bulgaria	3–0	Brazil	16–14	15–10	15–6			46–30
14 Oct	Soviet Union	3–0	Netherlands	15–8	15–3	15–11			45–22
14 Oct	Romania	3–0	Brazil	15–6	15–5	15–5			45–16
14 Oct	Czechoslovakia	3–2	Bulgaria	15–13	13–15	15–11	7–15	15–11	65–65
14 Oct	United States	3–2	South Korea	16–14	4–15	4–15	15–10	15–11	54–65
14 Oct	Hungary	3–0	Japan	15–12	15–8	15–12			45–32
15 Oct	Romania	3–2	Bulgaria	15–6	11–15	5–15	15–13	15–8	61–57
15 Oct	Soviet Union	3–0	South Korea	15–7	15–5	15–6			45–18
15 Oct	Netherlands	3–2	Brazil	14–16	15–11	15–12	6–15	16–14	66–68
15 Oct	Czechoslovakia	3–1	Japan	9–15	15–13	15–12	15–13		54–53
15 Oct	Hungary	3–0	United States	15–12	15–13	15–8			45–33
17 Oct	Japan	3–1	Bulgaria	15–10	12–15	15–6	15–10		57–41
17 Oct	Czechoslovakia	3–0	United States	15–7	15–13	16–14			46–34
17 Oct	Brazil	3–1	South Korea	15–12	15–8	14–16	16–14		60–50
17 Oct	Romania	3–0	Netherlands	15–9	15–6	15–13			45–28
17 Oct	Soviet Union	3–0	Hungary	15–9	15–13	15–11			45–33
18 Oct	Romania	3–2	South Korea	15–9	14–16	8–15	15–9	15–9	67–58
18 Oct	Bulgaria	3–2	Netherlands	15–11	8–15	15–8	14–16	15–8	67–58
18 Oct	Japan	3–1	United States	15–12	15–10	13–15	15–11		58–48
18 Oct	Brazil	3–2	Hungary	15–4	13–15	11–15	16–14	15–11	70–59
18 Oct	Soviet Union	3–2	Czechoslovakia	15–9	15–8	5–15	10–15	15–7	60–54
19 Oct	Bulgaria	3–0	United States	15–9	15–13	15–7			45–29
19 Oct	Netherlands	3–1	South Korea	13–15	15–7	16–14	15–8		59–44
19 Oct	Czechoslovakia	3–0	Brazil	15–5	15–6	15–10			45–21
19 Oct	Japan	3–1	Soviet Union	14–16	15–5	15–8	15–10		59–39
19 Oct	Romania	3–1	Hungary	15–6	12–15	15–10	16–14		58–45
21 Oct	Japan	3–2	Brazil	15–12	15–9	12–15	7–15	15–11	64–62
21 Oct	Bulgaria	3–1	South Korea	15–4	12–15	15–11	15–9		57–39
21 Oct	Hungary	3–1	Netherlands	15–4	8–15	15–11	15–12		53–42
21 Oct	Soviet Union	3–0	United States	15–6	15–5	15–4			45–15
21 Oct	Czechoslovakia	3–1	Romania	15–11	7–15	15–12	15–12		52–50
22 Oct	Hungary	3–2	South Korea	17–15	6–15	13–15	15–8	15–6	66–59
22 Oct	Czechoslovakia	3–1	Netherlands	10–15	15–10	15–9	15–6		55–40
22 Oct	Soviet Union	3–0	Bulgaria	15–2	16–14	15–13			46–29
22 Oct	Brazil	3–2	United States	5–15	11–15	15–9	15–6	15–9	61–54
22 Oct	Japan	3–0	Romania	15–6	15–9	15–8			45–23
23 Oct	Soviet Union	3–0	Brazil	15–7	15–6	15–9			45–22
23 Oct	Japan	3–1	Netherlands	15–17	15–4	15–8	15–5		60–34
23 Oct	Czechoslovakia	3–0	South Korea	15–1	15–7	15–9			45–17
23 Oct	Romania	3–1	United States	11–15	15–9	15–11	15–13		56–48
23 Oct	Bulgaria	3–1	Hungary	15–9	15–12	12–15	15–8		57–44

== Final standing ==
Rank	Team
1st place, gold medalist(s)	Soviet Union
2nd place, silver medalist(s)	Czechoslovakia
3rd place, bronze medalist(s)	Japan
4	Romania
5	Bulgaria
6	Hungary
7	Brazil
8	Netherlands
9	United States
10	South Korea

1964 Men's Olympic champions

Soviet Union
1st title

12–man Roster
Bugajenkovs, Burobin, Chesnokov, K'ach'arava, Kalachikhin, Kovalenko, Lugailo, Mondzolevski, Poyarkov, Sibiryakov, Vengerovsky, Voskoboynikov
Head coach
Yuri Chesnokov

== Medalists ==
Gold	Silver	Bronze
Soviet Union Ivans Bugajenkovs; Nikolay Burobin; Yuri Chesnokov; Vazha Kacharava; Valeri Kalachikhin; Vitali Kovalenko; Staņislavs Lugailo; Georgy Mondzolevski; Yuriy Poyarkov; Eduard Sibiryakov; Yury Vengerovsky; Dmitri Voskoboynikov Head coach: Yuri Chesnokov	Czechoslovakia Milan Čuda; Bohumil Golián; Zdeněk Humhal; Petr Kop; Josef Labuda; Josef Musil; Karel Paulus; Boris Perušič; Pavel Schenk; Václav Šmídl; Josef Šorm; Ladislav Toman Head coach: Josef Brož	Japan Yutaka Demachi; Tsutomu Koyama; Sadatoshi Sugawara; Naohiro Ikeda; Yasutaka Sato; Toshiaki Kosedo; Tokihiko Higuchi; Masayuki Minami; Takeshi Tokutomi; Teruhisa Moriyama; Yūzo Nakamura; Katsutoshi Nekoda Head coach: Yasutaka Matsudaira

== See also ==
- Volleyball at the Summer Olympics
- Volleyball at the 1964 Summer Olympics – Women's tournament
