= Japan at the 1964 Summer Olympics =

- IOC code: JPN
- NOC: Japanese Olympic Committee

in Tokyo
- Competitors: 328 (270 men and 58 women) in 21 sports
- Flag bearer: Makoto Fukui
- Medals Ranked 3rd: Gold 16 Silver 5 Bronze 8 Total 29

Summer Olympics appearances (overview)
- 1912; 1920; 1924; 1928; 1932; 1936; 1948; 1952; 1956; 1960; 1964; 1968; 1972; 1976; 1980; 1984; 1988; 1992; 1996; 2000; 2004; 2008; 2012; 2016; 2020; 2024; 2028

Japan was the host nation for the 1964 Summer Olympics in Tokyo. 328 competitors, 270 men and 58 women, took part in 155 events in 21 sports.

== Medalists ==
Medal	Name	Sport	Event	Date
Gold	Yoshinobu Miyake	Weightlifting	Men's featherweight	October 12
Gold	Yoshikatsu Yoshida	Wrestling	Men's freestyle flyweight	October 14
Gold	Yojiro Uetake	Wrestling	Men's freestyle bantamweight	October 14
Gold	Osamu Watanabe	Wrestling	Men's freestyle featherweight	October 14
Gold	Tsutomu Hanahara	Wrestling	Men's Greco-Roman flyweight	October 19
Gold	Masamitsu Ichiguchi	Wrestling	Men's Greco-Roman bantamweight	October 19
Gold	Takashi Ono; Shuji Tsurumi; Haruhiro Yamashita; Yukio Endo; Takuji Hayata; Takashi Mitsukuri	Gymnastics	Men's team all-around	October 20
Gold	Yukio Endo	Gymnastics	Men's individual all-around	October 20
Gold	Takehide Nakatani	Judo	Men's lightweight	October 20
Gold	Isao Okano	Judo	Men's middleweight	October 21
Gold	Isao Inokuma	Judo	Men's heavyweight	October 22
Gold	Takuji Hayata	Gymnastics	Men's rings	October 22
Gold	Yukio Endo	Gymnastics	Men's parallel bars	October 23
Gold	Haruhiro Yamashita	Gymnastics	Men's vault	October 23
Gold	Takao Sakurai	Boxing	Men's bantamweight	October 23
Gold	Masae Kasai; Emiko Miyamoto; Kinuko Tanida; Yuriko Handa; Yoshiko Matsumura; Sata Isobe; Katsumi Matsumura; Yoko Shinozaki; Setsuko Sasaki; Yuko Fujimoto; Masako Kondo; Ayano Shibuki	Volleyball	Women's tournament	October 23
Silver	Shuji Tsurumi	Gymnastics	Men's individual all-around	October 20
Silver	Yukio Endo	Gymnastics	Men's floor	October 22
Silver	Shuji Tsurumi	Gymnastics	Men's pommel horse	October 22
Silver	Shuji Tsurumi	Gymnastics	Men's parallel bars	October 23
Silver	Akio Kaminaga	Judo	Men's open category	October 23
Bronze	Shiro Ichinoseki	Weightlifting	Men's bantamweight	October 11
Bronze	Masashi Ohuchi	Weightlifting	Men's middleweight	October 14
Bronze	Iwao Horiuchi	Wrestling	Men's freestyle lightweight	October 14
Bronze	Yoshihisa Yoshikawa	Shooting	Men's 50 metre free pistol	October 18
Bronze	Yukiaki Okabe; Toshio Shoji; Makoto Fukui; Kunihiro Iwasaki	Swimming	Men's 4 × 200 m freestyle relay	October 18
Bronze	Kokichi Tsuburaya	Athletics	Men's marathon	October 21
Bronze	Taniko Nakamura; Kiyoko Ono; Hiroko Tsuji; Toshiko Shirasu; Ginko Chiba; Keiko Ikeda	Gymnastics	Women's artistic team all-around	October 21
Bronze	Yutaka Demachi; Tsutomu Koyama; Sadatoshi Sugawara; Naohiro Ikeda; Yasutaka Sato; Toshiaki Kosedo; Tokihiko Higuchi; Masayuki Minami; Takeshi Tokutomi; Teruhisa Moriyama; Yūzo Nakamura; Katsutoshi Nekoda	Volleyball	Men's tournament	October 23

Medals by sport
Sport	1st place, gold medalist(s)	2nd place, silver medalist(s)	3rd place, bronze medalist(s)	Total
Gymnastics	5	4	1	10
Wrestling	5	0	1	6
Judo	3	1	0	4
Weightlifting	1	0	2	3
Volleyball	1	0	1	2
Boxing	1	0	0	1
Athletics	0	0	1	1
Shooting	0	0	1	1
Swimming	0	0	1	1
Total	16	5	8	29

== Basketball ==
=== Group A ===
Pos	Team	Pld	W	L	PF	PA	PD	Pts	Qualification
1	Soviet Union	7	7	0	562	424	+138	14	Semifinals
2	Puerto Rico	7	5	2	493	454	+39	12	Semifinals
3	Poland	7	4	3	467	448	+19	11 (Note: Head-to-head record: Poland 1–0 Italy)	5th–8th classification round
4	Italy	7	4	3	495	480	+15	11	5th–8th classification round
5	Mexico	7	3	4	485	514	−29	10 (Note: Head-to-head record: Mexico 1–0 Japan)	9th–12th classification round
6	Japan (H)	7	3	4	421	428	−7	10	9th–12th classification round
7	Hungary	7	2	5	407	469	−62	9	13th–16th classification round
8	Canada	7	0	7	408	521	−113	7	13th–16th classification round

Source: FIBA archive
Rules for classification: 1) points; 2) head-to-head points; 3) head-to-head goal average; 4) head-to-head number of points scored.
(H) Hosts
Notes:

Pos	Team	Pld	W	L	PF	PA	PD	Pts	Qualification
1	United States	7	7	0	569	333	+236	14	Semifinals
2	Brazil	7	5	2	473	452	+21	12 (Note: Head-to-head record: Brazil 1–0 Yugoslavia)	Semifinals
3	Yugoslavia	7	5	2	529	453	+76	12	5th–8th classification round
4	Uruguay	7	4	3	472	482	−10	11	5th–8th classification round
5	Finland	7	3	4	409	475	−66	10	9th–12th classification round
6	Australia	7	2	5	434	460	−26	9 (Note: Head-to-head record: Australia 1–0 Peru)	9th–12th classification round
7	Peru	7	2	5	431	453	−22	9	13th–16th classification round
8	South Korea	7	0	7	432	641	−209	7	13th–16th classification round

Source: FIBA archive
Rules for classification: 1) points; 2) head-to-head points; 3) head-to-head goal average; 4) head-to-head number of points scored.
Notes:

October 11

17:30

Japan	55–65	Puerto Rico

Yoyogi National Gymnasium, Tokyo

12 October

12:00

Poland	81–57	Japan

Yoyogi National Gymnasium, Tokyo

October 13

19:00

Canada	37–58	Japan

Yoyogi National Gymnasium, Tokyo

October 14

12:00

Hungary	41–58	Japan

Yoyogi National Gymnasium, Tokyo

October 16

17:30

Soviet Union	72–59	Japan

Yoyogi National Gymnasium, Tokyo

October 17

9:00

Japan	72–68	Italy

Yoyogi National Gymnasium, Tokyo

October 18

12:00

Japan	62–64	Mexico

Yoyogi National Gymnasium, Tokyo

=== Classification brackets ===
9th–12th Place 21 October

10:00

Japan	54–45	Finland

Yoyogi National Gymnasium, Tokyo

9th Place 23 October

10:00

Australia	64–57	Japan

Yoyogi National Gymnasium, Tokyo

== Boxing ==
Men

Athlete	Event	First round	Second round	Third round	Quarterfinals	Semifinals	Final	
Athlete	Event	Opposition Result	Opposition Result	Opposition Result	Opposition Result	Opposition Result	Rank	
Shuta Yoshino	Flyweight	—N/a	BYE	Otto Babiasch (EUA); L 2-3	Did not advance			
Takao Sakurai	Bantamweight	—N/a	Brian Packer (GBR); W 4-1	Isaac Aryee (GHA); W 5–0	Nicolae Puiu (ROU); W 5–0	Washington Rodríguez (URU); W 5-0	Chung Shin-cho (KOR); W RSC	Gold medal
Masataka Takayama	Featherweight	—N/a	Ian McLoughlin (NRH); W 5–0	Piotr Gutman (POL); L RSC	Did not advance			
Kanemaru Shiratori	Lightweight	BYE	Sammy Amekudji (GHA); W KO	Ronald Allen Harris (USA); L 0-5	Did not advance			
Hoji Yonekura	Light welterweight	BYE	Miguel Velázquez (ESP); W 3-2	Félix Betancourt (CUB); L 2-3	Did not advance			
Kichijiro Hamada	Welterweight	—N/a	Sayed Mahmoudpour Roudsari (IRN); W 5-0	Manfredo Alipala (PHI); W 5–0	Marian Kasprzyk (POL); L 0-5	Did not advance		
Koji Masuda	Light middleweight	—N/a	Jannie Gibson (RHO); W RSC	Joseph Gonzales (URS); L 2-3	Did not advance			
Hitoshi Tenma	Middleweight	—N/a	Juan Aguilar (ARG); L 0-5	Did not advance				
Tadayuki Maruyama	Heavyweight	—N/a		Athol McQueen (AUS); L 0-5	Did not advance			

== Canoeing ==
Men

Athlete	Event	Heats		Repechages		Semifinals		Final	
Athlete	Event	Time	Rank	Time	Rank	Time	Rank	Time	Rank
Shoji Yoshio	C-1 1000 m	5:05.11	4 QS	—N/a		5:00.88	4	Did not advance	
Shunichi Iwamura; Daisaburo Honda	C-2 1000 m	4:25.86	5 QR	—N/a		4:40.54	4	Did not advance	
Hideo Higashiyama	K-1 1000 m	4:17.47	6 QR	4:42.93	1 QS	4:17.44	4	Did not advance	
Hideo Kobayashi; Katsufusa Kashimura	K-2 1000 m	4:00.94	8 QR	4:03.67	4	Did not advance			
Izumi Eto; Tomio Sumimoto; Tadamasa Sato; Yuji Umezawa	K-4 1000 m	3:33.25	8 QR	3:34.68	4	Did not advance			

Women

Athlete	Event	Heats		Semifinals		Final	
Athlete	Event	Time	Rank	Time	Rank	Time	Rank
Hiroko Oshima; Keiko Okamoto	K-2 500 m	2:14.53	5 QS	2:18.39	4	2:18.39	10

== Cycling ==
15 cyclists represented Japan in 1964.

=== Road ===
Athlete	Event	Time	Rank
Toshiro Akamatsu	Men's road race	4:39:51.83	106
Masashi Omiya	Men's road race	4:39:51.76	37
Masanori Tsuji	Men's road race	DNF	
Hiroshi Yamao	Men's road race	4:39:51.83	105
Takehisa Kato; Masashi Omiya; Yoshio Shimura; Hirotsugu Fukuhara	Team time trial	2:40:13.27	19

=== Track ===
1000m time trial

Athlete	Event	Time	Rank
Katsuhiko Sato	Men's 1000m time trial	1:11.68	10

Men's tandem

Athlete	Event	Heats	Repechage	Repechage Finals	Quarterfinals	Semifinals	Final	
Athlete	Event	Opposition Time Speed (km/h)	Opposition Time Speed (km/h)	Opposition Time Speed (km/h)	Opposition Time Speed (km/h)	Opposition Time Speed (km/h)	Opposition Time Speed (km/h)	Rank
Hideo Madarame; Toshimitsu Teshima	Tandem	Bicskey; Habony (HUN); L	Morelon; Trentin (FRA); Mercado; Tellez (MEX); L	Did not advance				

Men's Sprint

Athlete	Event	Heats	Repechage 1	Repechage Finals	Round 2	Repechage 2	Repechage Finals	Quarterfinals	Semifinals	Final	
Athlete	Event	Time Speed (km/h)	Rank	Opposition Time Speed (km/h)	Opposition Time Speed (km/h)	Opposition Time Speed (km/h)	Opposition Time Speed (km/h)	Opposition Time Speed (km/h)	Opposition Time Speed (km/h)	Opposition Time Speed (km/h)	Rank
Tsuyoshi Kawachi	Men's sprint	Schillinger (EUA); Fredborg (DEN); L	Gibbon (TRI); Phivana (CAM); L	Did not advance							
Katsuhiko Sato	Men's sprint	Mercado (MEX); Simes (USA); W 11.92	BYE		Fuggerer (EUA); Kučírek (IND); L	Pkhak'adze (URS); Harrison (ITA); L	Did not advance				

Pursuit

Athlete	Event	Round of 16	Quarterfinals	Semifinals	Final	
Athlete	Event	Time	Rank	Opposition Time	Opposition Time	Opposition Time
Hiromi Yamafuji	Men's individual pursuit	Martín Rodríguez (COL); W 5:17.57	Did not advance			
Norio Hotogi; Fujio Ito; Kosaku Takahashi; Hiromi Yamafuji	Team pursuit	India (IND); W 4:55.04	Did not advance			

== Diving ==
Men

Athlete	Event	Preliminaries		Final			
Athlete	Event	Points	Rank	Points	Rank	Total	Rank
Yosuke Arimitsu	10 m platform	90.56	14	Did not advance			
Shunsuke Kaneto	3 m springboard	71.59	24	Did not advance			
Shunsuke Kaneto	10 m platform	91.31	11	Did not advance			
Toshio Otsubo	10 m platform	94.32	3 Q	47.73	8	142.05	8
Tadao Tosa	3 m springboard	89.10	11	Did not advance			
Toshio Yamano	3 m springboard	81.74	21	Did not advance			

Women

Athlete	Event	Preliminaries		Final			
Athlete	Event	Points	Rank	Points	Rank	Total	Rank
Hatsuko Kawai-Hirose	10 m platform	45.00	16	Did not advance			
Keiko Osaki	10 m platform	45.20	15	Did not advance			
Kanoko Tsutani-Mabuchi	3 m springboard	85.27	7 Q	40.01	7	125.28	7
Kumiko Watanabe	3 m springboard	84.40	9 Q	35.94	9	120.34	9
Kumiko Watanabe	10 m platform	43.50	18	Did not advance			

== Equestrian ==
=== Dressage ===
Athlete	Horse	Event	Qualification		Final	
Athlete	Horse	Event	Penalties	Rank	Penalties	Rank
Kikuko Inoue	Katsunobori	Individual	648.0	16	Did not advance	
Okabe Nagahira	Seiha	Individual	589.5	19	Did not advance	
Matsudaira Yorisuke	Hamachidori	Individual	542.0	21	Did not advance	
Inoue Kikuko; Okabe Nagahira; Matsudaira Yorisuke	See above	Team	—N/a		1779.5	6

=== Eventing ===
Athlete	Horse	Event	Qualification			Final	
Athlete	Horse	Event	Dressage	Cross country	Show jumping	Penalties	Rank
Matsudaira Masaki	Nippo	Individual	73.33	EL	Did not advance		
Katsumoto Masanori	Eiten	Individual	72.00	EL	Did not advance		
Chiba Mikio	Mauta	Individual	63.67	174.8	30.00	268.47	34
Maeda Rikutoshi	Hogetsu	Individual	76.00	EL	Did not advance		
Chiba Mikio; Matsudaira Masaki; Maeda Rikutoshi	See above	Team	268.47	EL	Did not advance		

=== Show jumping ===
Athlete	Horse	Event	Qualification		Final			
Athlete	Horse	Event	Penalties	Rank	Penalties	Rank	Total	Rank
Hiroshi Hoketsu	Raro	Individual	63.75	41	48.00	39	111.75	40
Sasa Shinzo	Snaefell	Individual	46.75	40	24.00	32	70.75	38
Kageyama Yuzo	Tokinoarashi	Individual	EL	Did not advance				
Hiroshi Hoketsu; Sasa Shinzo; Kageyama Yuzo	See above	Team	—N/a				340.00	12

== Fencing ==
15 fencers, 11 men and 4 women, represented Japan in 1964.

Men's foil

- Kazuo Mano
- Heizaburo Okawa
- Kazuhiko Tabuchi

Men's team foil

- Kazuhiko Tabuchi, Fujio Shimizu, Kazuo Mano, Heizaburo Okawa, Sosuke Toda

Men's épée

- Heizaburo Okawa
- Kazuhiko Tabuchi
- Toshiaki Araki

Men's team épée

- Toshiaki Araki, Katsutada Minatoi, Kazuhiko Tabuchi, Heizaburo Okawa, Takeshi Teshima

Men's sabre

- Mitsuyuki Funamizu
- Seiji Shibata
- Teruhiro Kitao

Men's team sabre

- Fujio Shimizu, Teruhiro Kitao, Seiji Shibata, Mitsuyuki Funamizu

Women's foil

- Tomoko Owada
- Tamiko Yasui
- Yoshie Takeuchi

Women's team foil

- Yoshie Komori, Tamiko Yasui, Tomoko Owada, Yoshie Takeuchi

== Football ==
=== Group D ===
Pos	Team	Pld	W	D	L	GF	GA	GD	Pts	Qualification
1	Ghana	2	1	1	0	4	3	+1	3	Advanced to knockout stage
2	Japan	2	1	0	1	5	5	0	2	Advanced to knockout stage
3	Argentina	2	0	1	1	3	4	−1	1	
4	Italy	0	0	0	0	0	0	0	0	Withdrew

Source: RSSSF
October 14, 1964
14:00

Japan	3–2	Argentina
Sugiyama 54'; Kawabuchi 81'; Ogi 82'	Report	Domínguez 24', 62'

Komazawa Olympic Park Stadium, Setagaya, Tokyo
Attendance: 19,049
Referee: Škorić (YUG)

October 16, 1964
14:00

Japan	2–3	Ghana
Sugiyama 12'; Yaegashi 52'	Report	Agyemang 27'; S. Acquah 69'; Fulaiteh 80'

Komazawa Olympic Park Stadium, Setagaya, Tokyo
Referee: Niţescu (ROU)

=== Quarter-finals ===
October 18, 1964
14:00

Czechoslovakia	4–0	Japan
Brumovský 43', 59'; Vojta 69' (pen.); Mráz 86'	Report

Komazawa Olympic Park Stadium, Setagaya, Tokyo
Attendance: 18,940
Referee: De Queiroz (BRA)

=== First consolation round ===
Played by losing quarter-finalists.

October 20, 1964
14:00

Japan	1–6	Yugoslavia
Kamamoto 61'	Report	Zambata 3', 5', 43', 63'; Osim 28', 60'

Nagai Stadium, Osaka
Attendance: 20,000
Referee: Imam (UAE)

== Hockey ==
=== Squad ===
Japan's field hockey team was represented by the following players:

- Hiroshi Miwa
- Tsuneya Yuzaki
- Akio Takashima
- Shigeo Kaoku
- Kunio Iwahashi
- Toshihiko Yamaoka
- Kenji Takizawa
- Junichi Yamaguchi
- Hiroshi Tanaka
- Michio Okabe
- Seiji Kihara
- Katsuhiro Yuzaki
- Tetsuya Wakabayashi

=== Preliminary round ===
The preliminary round was conducted by breaking the 15 teams into two groups of 7 and 8 teams. The groups then played a round-robin tournament with each team playing the other teams in the group once. 2 points were awarded for a win, 1 point for a tie, and 0 for a loss. The top two teams from each group advanced to the semifinals while the third and fourth played in consolation semifinals.

=== Group A ===
Place	Team	Wins	Ties	Losses	Points
1.	Pakistan	6	0	0	12 QS
2.	Australia	4	0	2	8 QS
3.	Kenya	3	1	2	7 QC
4.	Japan	3	0	3	6 QC
5.	Great Britain	2	0	4	4
6.	Rhodesia	1	1	4	3
7.	New Zealand	1	0	5	2

- Pakistan def. Japan 1-0
- Australia def. Japan 3-1
- Japan def. Kenya 2-0
- Great Britain def. Japan 1-0
- Japan def. Rhodesia 2-1
- Japan def. New Zealand 1-0

=== Semifinals ===
The top two teams in each of the groups played in the 1st-4th semifinals, with the winner of each group playing the second-place team in the other group. The third and fourth team in each group played in the consolation semifinals

Round	Winner	Score	Loser
Consolation	United Team of Germany	5-1	Japan

== Judo ==
Four judoka, all male, represented Japan in 1964.

Men's lightweight

- Takehide Nakatani

Men's mightweight

- Isao Okano

Men's heavyweight

- Isao Inokuma

Men's open class

- Akio Kaminaga

== Modern pentathlon ==
Three male pentathletes represented Japan in 1964.

Individual

- Shigeaki Uchino
- Yoshihide Fukutome
- Shigeki Mino

Team

- Shigeaki Uchino
- Yoshihide Fukutome
- Shigeki Mino

== Rowing ==
Men

Athlete	Event	Heats		Repechage		Final	
Athlete	Event	Time	Rank	Time	Rank	Time	Rank
Satoomi Kasagi	Single sculls	8:16.96	4 R	8:13.44	3 FB	7:37.90	11
Susumi Hosoya; Yasushi Murase	Double sculls	7:25.64	3 R	7:18.98	3 FB	7:15.22	10
Takao Kogo; Norimasa Kurosaki	Coxless pair	7:48.15	5 R	7:54.43	4	7:54.43	14
Toshihiro Hamada; Katsuhiko Ihara; Masahiro Takatsuki	Coxed pair	8:32.51	5 R	8:05.30	4	8:05.30	15
Shunsuke Miki; Koju Tsukamoto; Yasuji Honma; Bunzo Kimura	Coxless four	7:24.35	5 R	7:00.29	3 FB	6:51.60	12
Hideo Oe; Yukio Matsuda; Hideaki Aida; Masakatsu Yamanouchi; Noriichi Yoshino	Coxed four	7:10.77	5 R	7:31.60	4	7:31.60	14
Naoji Sato; Koichi Miyano; Tsugio Ito; Tsuneo Ogasawara; Yoshihiro Onishi; Shin Hasegawa; Hajime Ishikawa; Ryuzo Kikuchi; Osamu Mandai	Eight	6:16.67	3 R	6:10.15	2 FB	6:05.14	10

== Sailing ==
Open

Athlete	Event	Race							Net points	Final rank
Athlete	Event	1	2	3	4	5	6	7	Net points	Final rank
Takashi Yamada	Finn	18	~~21~~	17	18	14	20	11	2486	21
Yasutoshi Tagami; Kendjiro Matsuda	Flying Dutchman	9	6	13	~~DNF~~	15	16	14	2166	15
Masayuki Ishii; Takafumi Okubo	Star	15	11	7	13	13	16	~~DSQ~~	1494	13
Saburo Tanamachi; Tadashi Funaoka; Teruyuki Hiiro	Dragon	17	~~18~~	17	14	16	16	10	1762	17
Fujiya Matsumoto; Masao Yoshida; Takeshi Hagiwara	5.5 Metre	12	11	~~14~~	12	13	14	13	1070	14

== Shooting ==
Ten shooters represented Japan in 1964. Yoshihisa Yoshikawa won the bronze medal in the 50 m pistol event.

Men

Athlete	Event	Final	
Athlete	Event	Score	Rank
Toshiyasu Ishige	Trap	184	30
Takao Ishii	Men's 50 metre rifle three positions	1128	25
Takao Ishii	Men's 50 metre rifle prone	584	48
Kanji Kubo	25 m rapid fire pistol	587	8
Osamu Ochiai	25 m rapid fire pistol	579	24
Akihiro Rinzaki	Men's 50 metre rifle prone	594	6
Shigemi Saito	Men's 300 metre rifle three positions	1096	20
Shigemi Saito	Men's 50 metre rifle three positions	1106	34
Mitsuo Sanami	Trap	189	15
Shinji Takahashi	50 m pistol	536	26
Yoshihisa Yoshikawa	50 m pistol	554	Bronze medal
Hajime Watanuki	Men's 300 metre rifle three positions	1028	28

== Swimming ==
Men

Athlete	Event	Heat		Semifinal		Final	
Athlete	Event	Time	Rank	Time	Rank	Time	Rank
Tatsuo Fujimoto	100 metre freestyle	55.8	1 Q	55.8	6	Did not advance	
Shigeo Fukushima	200 metre backststroke	2:14.7	1 Q	2:14.1	2 Q	2:13.2	4
Tadaharu Goto	100 metre freestyle	55.8	2 Q	55.6	5	Did not advance	
Keisuke Ito	200 metre backststroke	2:16.7	2 Q	2:17.6	7	Did not advance	
Kazuyuki Iwamoto	1500 metre freestyle	17:52.7	3	Did not advance			
Yoshinori Kadonaga	200 metre butterfly	2:14.5	3 Q	2:12.3	3 Q	2:12.6	6
Kenjiro Matsumoto	200 metre breaststroke	2:33.8	1 Q	2:34.3	5	Did not advance	
Satoru Nakano	1500 metre freestyle	17:40.4	2	Did not advance			
Atsushi Obayashi	200 metre butterfly	2:15.1	2 Q	2:14.1	5	Did not advance	
Yukiaki Okabe	100 metre freestyle	54.4	2 Q	55.2	3	Did not advance	
Isagi Osumi	200 metre backststroke	2:17.3	2 Q	2:17.0	5	Did not advance	
Sueaki Sasaki	1500 metre freestyle	17:28.8	2 Q	—N/a		17:25.3	6
Kosuke Sato	200 metre butterfly	2:12.4	2 Q	2:13.4	5	Did not advance	
Yoshiaki Shikiishi	200 metre breaststroke	2:32.3	2 Q	2:34.5	6	Did not advance	
Osamu Tsurumine	200 metre breaststroke	2:34.1	2 Q	2:33.3	4 Q	2:33.6	6
Takeshi Yamakage	400 metre freestyle	4:27.8	3	Did not advance			
Tsuyoshi Yamanaka	400 metre freestyle	4:21.1	1 Q	—N/a		4:19.1	6
Haruo Yoshimuta	400 metre freestyle	4:28.8	2	Did not advance			
Kunihiro Iwasaki; Tadaharu Goto; Tatsuo Fujimoto; Yukiaki Okabe; Katsuki Ishihara	4 × 100 metre freestyle relay	3:42.3	3 Q	—N/a		3:40.5	4
Makoto Fukui; Kunihiro Iwasaki; Toshio Shoji; Yukiaki Okabe	4 × 200 metre freestyle relay	8:10.4	2 Q	—N/a		8:03.8	Bronze medal
Shigeo Fukushima; Kenji Ishikawa; Isao Nakajima; Yukiaki Okabe	4 × 100 metre medley relay	4:07.3	2 Q	—N/a		4:06,6	5

Women

Athlete	Event	Heat		Semifinal		Final	
Athlete	Event	Time	Rank	Time	Rank	Time	Rank
Miyoko Azuma	100 metre freestyle	1:06.4	6	Did not advance			
Kimiko Ezaka	400 metre individual medley	5:42.1	4	Did not advance			
Kazue Hayakawa	400 metre freestyle	4:56.5	3	Did not advance			
Michiko Kihara	100 metre backststroke	1:11.1	3	Did not advance			
Tazuko Kikutani	400 metre freestyle	5:06.3	5	Did not advance			
Toyoko Kimura	100 metre freestyle	1:04.8	4	Did not advance			
Natsuko Matsuda	400 metre individual medley	5:51.5	4	Did not advance			
Yoshiko Morizane	200 metre breaststroke	2:59.9	6	Did not advance			
Hiroko Saito	100 metre butterfly	1:13.1	5	Did not advance			
Kimiko Sato	100 metre butterfly	1:10.6	4 Q	1:11.2	8	Did not advance	
Eiko Takahashi	100 metre butterfly	1:08.4	2 Q	1:07.8	3 Q	1:09.1	7
Satoko Tanaka	100 metre backststroke	1:10.0	2 Q	—N/a		1:08.6	4
Ryoko Urakami	100 metre freestyle	1:04.5	5	Did not advance			
Noriko Yamamoto	200 metre breaststroke	2:57.0	5	Did not advance			
Ryoko Urakami; Michiko Kihara; Toyoko Kimura; Miyoko Azuma	4 × 400 metre freestyle relay	4:19.2	5	Did not advance			
Satoko Tanaka; Noriko Yamamoto; Eiko Takahashi; Michiko Kihara	4 × 100 metre medley relay	4:40.6	2 Q	—N/a		4:42.0	4

== Volleyball ==
=== Men's team competition ===
Pos	Team	Pld	W	L	Pts	SW	SL	SR	SPW	SPL	SPR
1	Soviet Union	9	8	1	17	25	5	5.000	415	279	1.487
2	Czechoslovakia	9	8	1	17	26	10	2.600	486	399	1.218
3	Japan	9	7	2	16	22	12	1.833	475	372	1.277
4	Romania	9	6	3	15	19	15	1.267	432	394	1.096
5	Bulgaria	9	5	4	14	20	16	1.250	464	429	1.082
6	Hungary	9	4	5	13	18	18	1.000	449	466	0.964
7	Brazil	9	3	6	12	13	23	0.565	410	474	0.865
8	Netherlands	9	2	7	11	11	24	0.458	378	482	0.784
9	United States	9	2	7	11	10	23	0.435	360	450	0.800
10	South Korea	9	0	9	9	9	27	0.333	376	500	0.752

Date		Score		Set 1	Set 2	Set 3	Set 4	Set 5	Total
13 Oct	Japan	3–0	South Korea	17–15	15–8	15–3			47–26
14 Oct	Hungary	3–0	Japan	15–12	15–8	15–12			45–32
15 Oct	Czechoslovakia	3–1	Japan	9–15	15–13	15–12	15–13		54–53
17 Oct	Japan	3–1	Bulgaria	15–10	12–15	15–6	15–10		57–41
18 Oct	Japan	3–1	United States	15–12	15–10	13–15	15–11		58–48
19 Oct	Japan	3–1	Soviet Union	14–16	15–5	15–8	15–10		59–39
21 Oct	Japan	3–2	Brazil	15–12	15–9	12–15	7–15	15–11	64–62
22 Oct	Japan	3–0	Romania	15–6	15–9	15–8			45–23
23 Oct	Japan	3–1	Netherlands	15–17	15–4	15–8	15–5		60–34

Team roster

- Yutaka Demachi
- Tsutomu Koyama
- Sadatoshi Sugahara
- Naohiro Ikeda
- Yassu Saito
- Toshiaki Kosedo
- Tokihiko Higuchi
- Masayuki Minami
- Takeshi Tokutomi
- Teruhisa Moriyama
- Yūzo Nakamura
- Katsutoshi Nekoda

=== Women's team competition ===
Pos	Team	Pld	W	L	Pts	SW	SL	SR	SPW	SPL	SPR
1	Japan	5	5	0	10	15	1	15.000	238	93	2.559
2	Soviet Union	5	4	1	9	12	3	4.000	212	97	2.186
3	Poland	5	3	2	8	10	6	1.667	180	162	1.111
4	Romania	5	2	3	7	6	9	0.667	140	172	0.814
5	United States	5	1	4	6	3	12	0.250	98	213	0.460
6	South Korea	5	0	5	5	0	15	0.000	94	225	0.418

Date	Time		Score		Set 1	Set 2	Set 3	Set 4	Set 5	Total	Report
11 Oct	15:15	United States	0–3	Japan	1–15	5–15	2–15			8–45	Report
12 Oct	19:15	Romania	0–3	Japan	7–15	3–15	8–15			18–45	Report
14 Oct	20:30	South Korea	0–3	Japan	3–15	2–15	4–15			9–45	Report
18 Oct	13:50	Poland	1–3	Japan	4–15	5–15	15–13	2–15		26–58	Report
23 Oct	19:35	Japan	3–0	Soviet Union	15–11	15–8	15–13			45–32	Report

Final standings

Place	Team	Pts	W	L	SF	SA	PF	PA
	Japan	10	5	0	15	1	238	93
	Soviet Union	8	4	1	12	3	212	97
	Poland	6	3	2	10	6	180	162
4	Romania	4	2	3	6	9	140	172
5	United States	2	1	4	3	12	98	213
6	South Korea	0	0	5	0	15	94	225

Team roster

- Masae Kasai (c)
- Emiko Miyamoto
- Kinuko Tanida
- Yuriko Handa
- Yoshiko Matsumura
- Sata Isobe
- Katsumi Matsumura
- Yoko Shinozaki
- Setsuko Sasaki
- Yuko Fujimoto
- Masako Kondo
- Ayano Shibuki

Head coach: Hirofumi Daimatsu

== Water polo ==
=== Group A ===
Pos	Team	Pld	W	D	L	GF	GA	GD	Pts
1	Italy	2	2	0	0	9	6	+3	4
2	Romania	2	1	0	1	12	8	+4	2
3	Japan	2	0	0	2	7	14	−7	0

- October 11, 1964

Italy	4 – 3	Romania

- October 12, 1964

Italy	5 – 3	Japan

- October 13, 1964

Romania	9 – 4	Japan

== Weightlifting ==
Men

Athlete	Event	Military Press		Snatch		Clean & Jerk		Total	Rank
Athlete	Event	Result	Rank	Result	Rank	Result	Rank	Total	Rank
Yukio Furuyama	56 kg	105.0	6	100.0	8	130.0	9	335.0	6
Shiro Ishinoseki	56 kg	100.0	9	110.0	1	137.5	3	347.5	Bronze medal
Hiroshi Fukuda	60 kg	120.0	3	115.0	2	140.0	5	375.0	4
Yoshinobu Miyake	60 kg	122.5	1	122.5	1	152.5	1	397.5	Gold medal
Hiroshi Yamazaki	67.5 kg	120.0	9	120.0	5	157.5	5	397.5	6
Sadahiro Miwa	75 kg	120.0	10	132.5	3	170.0	4	422.5	5
Masashi Ohuchi	75 kg	140.0	1	135.0	2	162.5	6	437.5	Bronze medal
