= Volleyball at the 1964 Summer Olympics – Women's tournament =

Women's volleyball at the Games of the XVIII Olympiad
- Venue: Komazawa Volleyball Courts; Yokohama Cultural Gymnasium
- Date: 11–23 October
- Competitors: 71 from 6 nations

Medalists
1st place, gold medalist(s)		Japan (1st title)
2nd place, silver medalist(s)		Soviet Union
3rd place, bronze medalist(s)		Poland

The inaugural Women's Volleyball Tournament in the Summer Olympic Games was held during Olympic Games of Tokyo, from October 11 to October 23, 1964. Japan won the gold medal, with the Soviet Union and Poland taking silver and bronze, respectively. The gold medal-winning Japanese team was referred to as the "Oriental Witches" due to their domination of the women's volleyball scene in the early 1960s. The final match between Japan and the Soviet Union was watched by over 80% of the entire population of Japan, according to NHK. Princess Michiko was present at the final match.

== Qualification ==
Means of qualification	Date	Host	Vacancies	Qualified
Host Country	26 May 1959	(West Germany) Munich	1	Japan
1962 World Championship	13-25 October 1962	Soviet Union	2	Soviet Union
1962 World Championship	13-25 October 1962	Soviet Union	2	Poland
1963 European Championship	22 October-2 November 1963	Romania	1	Romania
Asian Qualifier	22-30 December 1963	(India) New Delhi	1	~~North Korea~~ * South Korea
1963 Pan American Games	21 April – 3 May 1963	(Brazil) São Paulo	1	~~Brazil~~United States
Total			6	

*North Korea did not send its delegation to Tokyo because it does not have bilateral relations with Japan.Their spot was given to South Korea.

== Format ==
The tournament was played in a single round-robin format, all teams were placed into a single pool and faced each other once.

== Venues ==
- Komazawa Volleyball Courts in Tokyo
- Yokohama Cultural Gymnasium in Yokohama

== Round robin ==
Pos	Team	Pld	W	L	Pts	SW	SL	SR	SPW	SPL	SPR
1	Japan	5	5	0	10	15	1	15.000	238	93	2.559
2	Soviet Union	5	4	1	9	12	3	4.000	212	97	2.186
3	Poland	5	3	2	8	10	6	1.667	180	162	1.111
4	Romania	5	2	3	7	6	9	0.667	140	172	0.814
5	United States	5	1	4	6	3	12	0.250	98	213	0.460
6	South Korea	5	0	5	5	0	15	0.000	94	225	0.418

- All times are Japan Standard Time (UTC+09:00).

Date	Time		Score		Set 1	Set 2	Set 3	Set 4	Set 5	Total	Report
11 Oct	13:15	Romania	0–3	Soviet Union	5–15	6–15	0–15			11–45	Report
11 Oct	15:15	United States	0–3	Japan	1–15	5–15	2–15			8–45	Report
12 Oct	15:15	South Korea	0–3	Soviet Union	0–15	6–15	0–15			6–45	Report
12 Oct	17:15	United States	0–3	Poland	3–15	4–15	10–15			17–45	Report
12 Oct	19:15	Romania	0–3	Japan	7–15	3–15	8–15			18–45	Report
13 Oct	17:15	Romania	3–0	United States	15–9	15–1	15–2			45–12	Report
14 Oct	15:15	South Korea	0–3	Poland	5–15	5–15	11–15			21–45	Report
14 Oct	20:30	South Korea	0–3	Japan	3–15	2–15	4–15			9–45	Report
15 Oct	14:00	Poland	0–3	Soviet Union	9–15	5–15	5–15			19–45	Report
17 Oct	13:15	Soviet Union	3–0	United States	15–1	15–8	15–7			45–16	Report
18 Oct	13:50	Poland	1–3	Japan	4–15	5–15	15–13	2–15		26–58	Report
19 Oct	17:15	Romania	3–0	South Korea	15–10	15–9	15–6			45–25	Report
21 Oct	11:15	South Korea	0–3	United States	7–15	13–15	13–15			33–45	Report
22 Oct	19:15	Romania	0–3	Poland	7–15	6–15	8–15			21–45	Report
23 Oct	19:35	Japan	3–0	Soviet Union	15–11	15–8	15–13			45–32	Report

== Final standings ==
Rank	Team
1st place, gold medalist(s)	Japan
2nd place, silver medalist(s)	Soviet Union
3rd place, bronze medalist(s)	Poland
4	Romania
5	United States
6	South Korea

1964 Women's Olympic champions

Japan
1st title

12-woman roster
Masae Kasai (c), Emiko Miyamoto, Kinuko Tanida, Yuriko Handa, Yoshiko Matsumura, Sata Issobe, Katsumi Matsumura, Yoko Shinozaki, Setsuko Sassaki, Yuko Fujimoto, Massako Kondo, Ayano Shibuki
Head coach
Hirofumi Daimatsu

== Medalists ==
Gold	Silver	Bronze
Japan Masae Kasai (c); Emiko Miyamoto; Kinuko Tanida; Yuriko Handa; Yoshiko Matsumura; Sata Issobe; Katsumi Matsumura; Yoko Shinozaki; Setsuko Sassaki; Yuko Fujimoto; Massako Kondo; Ayano Shibuki Head coach: Hirofumi Daimatsu	Soviet Union Nelli Abramova; Astra Biltauere; Lyudmila Buldakova (c); Lyudmila Gureyeva; Valentina Kamenek; Marita Katusheva; Ninel Lukanina; Valentina Mishak; Tatyana Roshchina; Inna Ryskal; Antonina Ryzhova; Tamara Tikhonina Head coach: Oleg Chekov	Poland Krystyna Czajkowska; Maria Golimowska; Krystyna Jakubowska; Danuta Kordaczuk; Krystyna Krupa; Józefa Ledwig; Jadwiga Marko; Jadwiga Rutkowska; Maria Śliwka; Zofia Szczęśniewska; Hanna Busz; Barbara Hermel Head coach: Benedykt Krysik

== Gallery ==
1964 Tokyo Olympics Women's Volleyball
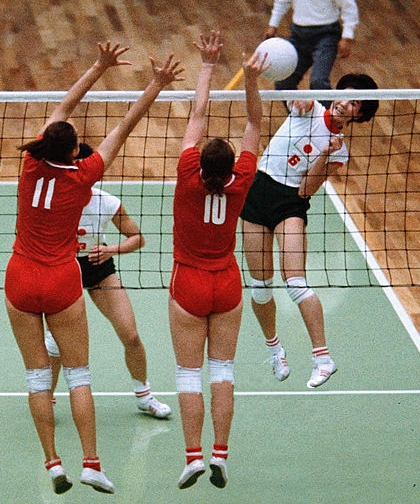
Sata Isobe spiking ball against Soviet Union National Team, 1964 Tokyo Olympics Women's Volleyball

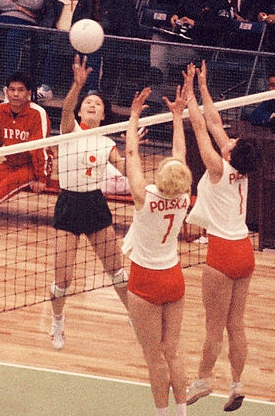
Yuriko Handa spiking ball against Poland National Team, 1964 Tokyo Olympics Women's Volleyball

== See also ==
- Volleyball at the Summer Olympics
- Volleyball at the 1964 Summer Olympics – Men's tournament
