= Idaten (TV series) =

2019 taiga drama about Olympic athletes Shiso Kanakuri and Masaji Tabata

- Also known as: Idaten: The Epic Marathon to Tokyo
- Written by: Kankurō Kudō
- Directed by: Tsuyoshi Inoue (chief)
- Starring: Nakamura Kankurō VI; Sadao Abe; Haruka Ayase; Toma Ikuta; Gen Hoshino; Tori Matsuzaka; Kumiko Asō; Hana Sugisaki; Moka Kamishiraishi; Mirai Moriyama; Ryunosuke Kamiki; Ai Hashimoto; Koharu Sugawara; Nakamura Shidō II; Sarutoki Minagawa; Charlotte Kate Fox; Kanji Furutachi; Shinobu Terajima; Yutaka Takenouchi; Yutaka Matsushige; Lily Franky; Tetta Sugimoto; Hiroko Yakushimaru; Tadanobu Asano; Shinobu Otake; Kōji Yakusho
- Narrated by: Takeshi Kitano; Mirai Moriyama; Ryunosuke Kamiki
- Opening theme: "Idaten Main Theme" (「いだてんメインテーマ」)
- Composer: Otomo Yoshihide
- Country of origin: Japan
- Original language: Japanese
- No. of episodes: 47

Production
- Producers: Kei Kurube (chief); Takuya Shimizu
- Running time: 45 minutes

Original release
- Network: NHK
- Release: January 6 – December 15, 2019

Idaten: Tokyo Orinpikku-banashi (いだてん〜東京オリムピック噺〜; Idaten: The Epic Marathon to Tokyo) is a Japanese historical drama television series and the 58th NHK taiga drama. It stars Nakamura Kankurō VI and Sadao Abe as marathon runner Shiso Kanakuri and swimming coach Masaji Tabata respectively. It began broadcasting in 2019 as part of the lead up to the 2020 Summer Olympics for which NHK was, under the Japan Consortium, principal co-host broadcaster. This drama marks the 55th anniversary of the 1964 Summer Olympics, which the NHK broadcast. It is the second post-war taiga drama in NHK history (the first was Inochi: Life in 1986) and the last series to premiere in the Heisei era and the first series to air during the Reiwa era. The series received an average rating of 8.2%, the lowest in history for a taiga drama.

== Plot ==
The drama focuses on the stories of two Japanese Olympians from different times of the 20th century: marathon runner Shiso Kanakuri, who took part in the 1912 Stockholm Summer Olympics and one of the first Japanese athletes to compete in the Games, and swimming coach Masaji Tabata, known as a founding father of Japanese swimming and was part of the successful efforts to bring the Olympics to Japan.

== Cast ==
=== Starring ===
- Nakamura Kankurō VI as Shiso Kanakuri, a marathon runner
  - Rintarō Hisano as child Shiso
  - Daichirō Funamoto as teen Shiso
- Sadao Abe as Masaji Tabata, a reporter and swimming coach
  - Soma Santoki as young Masaji (early teens)
  - Yūya Hara as young Masaji (late teens and early twenties)

=== Kanakuri family ===
- Nakamura Shidō II as Sanetsugu Kanakuri, Shiso's brother
- Tomorowo Taguchi as Nobuhiko Kanakuri, Shiso's father
- Yoshiko Miyazaki as Shie Kanakuri, Shiso's mother
- Hisako Ōkata as Suma Kanakuri, Shiso's grandmother

=== Ikebe family ===
- Haruka Ayase as Suya Haruno, Shiso's wife
  - Riri Harashima as young Suya
- Shinobu Otake as Ikue Ikebe, Shiso's adoptive mother
- Yō Takahashi as Shigeyuki Ikebe, Suya's deceased husband

=== Tabata family ===
- Kumiko Asō as Kikue, Masaji's wife
- Toshie Negishi as Ura Tabata, Masaji's mother
- Haruka Uchimura as Shōkichi Tabata, Masaji's older brother
- Ai Yoshikawa as Atsuko Tabata, Masaji's daughter

=== Mishima family ===
- Toma Ikuta as Yahiko Mishima
- Yukiyoshi Ozawa as Yatarō Mishima
- Kayoko Shiraishi as Wakako Mishima, Yahiko and Yatarō's mother

=== Shiso's friends ===
- Hana Sugisaki as Shima, Gorin's grandmother, and Riku, Gorin's mother
- Tasuku Emoto as Masuno, Shima's husband and Riku's father
- Taiga Nakano as Masaru Komatsu, Riku's husband and Gorin's father
- Hiroki Miyake as Shinsaku Kurosaka (eps. 16 onwards)
  - Pierre Taki as Shinsaku Kurosaka (eps. 4–10)
- Mayumi Satō as Chō Kurosaka, Shinsaku's wife
- Ryo Katsuji as Hidenobu Mikawa
- 201 Ami as Sanpo Toku

=== JOC / Japan Amateur Athletic Association ===
- Kōji Yakusho as Jigorō Kanō, the 1st President of the Japanese Olympic Committee
- Ryō Iwamatsu as Seiichi Kishi, the 2nd President
- Jun Inoue as Juichi Tsushima, the 7th President
- Yutaka Takenouchi as Hyozo Omori, the team manager at the 1912 Stockholm Olympics
- Charlotte Kate Fox as Annie Shepley Omori, Hyozo's wife
- Kanji Furutachi as Isao Kani
- Tetta Sugimoto as Dōmei Nagai
- Toshiyuki Nagashima as Chiyosaburō Takeda
- Kazunaga Tsuji as Hisayoshi Kanō
- Shinobu Terajima as Tokuyo Nikaidō
- Tori Matsuzaka as Yukiaki Iwata
- Yutaka Matsushige as Ryotaro Azuma, the Governor of Tokyo
- Miou Tanaka as Tadaoki Yamamoto

=== Japanese members of the IOC ===
- Masaya Kato as Yōtarō Sugimura
- Shinya Tsukamoto as Michimasa Soejima

=== Japan Swimming Federation ===
- Sarutoki Minagawa as Ikkaku Matsuzawa

=== The people living in Asakusa ===
- Takeshi Kitano as Kokontei Shinshō V / the storyteller
  - Mirai Moriyama as Kōzō Minobe (young Shinshō) / the storyteller
- Shino Ikenami as Rin Minobe, Shinshō's wife
  - Kaho as young Rin
- Ryunosuke Kamiki as Gorin
- Ai Hashimoto as Koume
- Kazunobu Mineta as Sei-san
- Suzuki Matsuo as Tachibanaya Enkyō IV, Shinshō's master
- Tokio Emoto as Manchō
- Rina Kawaei as Chie, Gorin's lover
- Yoshiyoshi Arakawa as Imamatsu
- Kyōko Koizumi as Mitsuko, Shinshō's eldest daughter
- Maki Sakai as Kimiko, Shinshō's second daughter
- Nakamura Shichinosuke II as Sanyūtei Enshō VI

=== Asahi Shimbun ===
- Lily Franky as Taketora Ogata, Masaji's boss
- Kenta Kiritani as Ichirō Kōno, Masaji's rival
  - Hiroto Ōshita as young Ichirō
- Kazuhiro Yamaji as Ryōhei Murayama
- Jirō (Sissonne) as Odaka

=== Tengu Club ===
- Shinnosuke Mitsushima as Shinkei Yoshioka
- Koen Kondo as Rinsen Nakazawa
- Sō Takei as Shunrō Oshikawa

=== Other athletes ===
- Kento Nagayama as Genzaburō Noguchi
- Koharu Sugawara as Kinue Hitomi
- Rintarō Ikeda as Chūhei Nambu
- Naruki Matsukawa as Mikio Oda
- Yūsuke Gambale as Sohn Kee-chung, a.k.a. Son Kitei
- Kai Inowaki as Yoshinori Sakai
- Mikuri Kiyota as Kumie Suzuki
- Ken Sugawara as Kōkichi Tsuburaya

- Takumi Saitoh as Katsuo Takaishi
- Takahiro Miura as Kazuo Noda
- Moka Kamishiraishi as Hideko Maehata
- Shunsuke Daitō as Yoshiyuki Tsuruta
- Kento Hayashi as Tsutomu Ōyokota
- Ōshirō Maeda as Reizo Koike
- Mai Kiryū as Hatsuho Matsuzawa
- Arisa Sasaki as Kazue Kojima
- Nagisa Nishino as Yukie Arata
- Yūta Uchida as Masaji Kiyokawa
- Jun Nishiyama as Yasuji Miyazaki
- Kosuke Kitajima as Hironoshin Furuhashi
- Daisuke Hosokawa as Shiro Hashizume

- Sakura Ando as Masae Kasai
- Miho Izumikawa as Emiko Miyamoto
- Koharu Sakai as Kinuko Tanida
- Nagisa Matsunaga as Yuriko Handa
- Shen Tanaka as Yoshiko Matsumura
- Miyū Kitamuki as Sata Isobe
- Yūko Watanabe as Emiko Suzuki

=== Other politicians ===
- Tadanobu Asano as Shōjirō Kawashima, the secretary-general of the LDP
- Issey Ogata as Hidejirō Nagata
- Kitarō as Toratarō Ushizuka
- Kenichi Hagiwara as Korekiyo Takahashi
- Sansei Shiomi as Tsuyoshi Inukai
- Sei Hiraizumi as Shigenobu Ōkuma, the founder of Waseda University
- Kenta Hamano as Hirobumi Itō
- Katsuya Kobayashi as Gorō Miura
- Tatekawa Danshun as Hayato Ikeda
- Hideaki Matsunaga as Kōichi Kido
- Hiroshi Ōkōchi as Kenji Fukunaga

=== Foreigners ===
- Nicolas Lumbreras as Pierre de Coubertin (France) , the founder of the IOC
- Jappe Claes as Henri de Baillet-Latour (Belgium) , the third president of the IOC
- Michael Sorich as Avery Brundage (United States) , the fifth president of the IOC
  - Don Johnson as Avery Brundage (United States) in the 1930s
- Dasha Teranishi as Mrs. Brundage (United States)
- Dino Spinella as Benito Mussolini (Kingdom of Italy)
- Francesco Biscione as Alberto Bonacossa (Kingdom of Italy)
- Daniel Schuster as Adolf Hitler (Nazi Germany)
- Huang Shi as Wang Zhengting (Taiwan)
- Laz B as William May Garland (United States)
- Didier as Auguste Gérard (France)
- Eduardo Breda as Francisco Lázaro (Portugal)
- Edvin Endre as Daniel (Sweden) , an interpreter
- Max Backholm as Paul Zerling (Sweden)
- Marc-Olivier Caron as Buster Crabbe (United States)
- Marthe Romund as Martha Genenger (Nazi Germany)
- Kai Hoshino Sandy as Jacob (Nazi Germany) , an interpreter
- Derebe as Abebe Bikila
- Danny Winn as Douglas MacArthur (United States)
- Steve Wiley as Edwin O. Reischauer (United States)
- Lutfi Bakhtiyar as Sukarno (Indonesia)
- Eduwart Manalu as Allen (Indonesia) , an interpreter
- Raja as Guru Dutt Sondhi (India)
- Alioune as Léon Yombe (Republic of the Congo)
- Max as Henri Elendé (Republic of the Congo)

=== NHK ===
- Gen Hoshino as Kazushige Hirasawa, a foreign affairs commentator
- Tortoise Matsumoto as Sansei Kasai
- Masato Wada as Teru Yamamoto
- Daichi Watanabe (Kuroneko Chelsea) as Hisaya Morishige
- Taishi Masaoka as Seigorō Kitade

=== Other journalists ===
- Mizuki Yamamoto as Honjō
- Sō Yamanaka as Zenmaro Toki

=== Other people related to the 1964 Summer Olympics ===
- Ryuhei Matsuda as Kenzō Tange, an architect
- Kōki Mitani as Kon Ichikawa, a film director
- Kenta Hamano as Haruo Minami, a singer
- Daisuke Kuroda as Nobuo Murakami, a chef
- Tetsu Hirahara as Kenkichi Oshima
- Kenta Maeno as Yūsaku Kamekura, a graphic designer
- Umika Kawashima as Yasuko Ōgawara, an interpreter
- Taro Suruga as Haruhide Matsushita, an aircraft pilot
- Ren Sudō as Tadamasa Fukiura
- Yoshimi Tokui (Tutorial) as Hirofumi Daimatsu
- Akihiro Kakuta (Tokyo 03) as Eiichi Morinishi, a taxi driver
- Cunning Takeyama as the owner of Suimeitei
- Hideto Iwai as Hideo Kitahara
- Shinshō Nakamaru as Shigeru Yosano

=== Others ===
- Hiroko Yakushimaru as Marie
- Yuina Kuroshima as Tomie Murata
- Itsuji Itao as Daisaku Murata, Tomie's father
- Hajime Inoue as Sadatsuchi Uchida
- Kenta Satoi as Dr. Haruno, Suya's father
- Bengal as Kinji Tajima
- Raikō Sakamoto as a katsudō-benshi
- Kang Sang-jung as Mr. Gojō
- Hiroaki Nerio as a man with a mustache
- Shiyun Nakamura as Count Maresuke Nogi
- Makita Sports as a prisoner
- Moemi Katayama as Chii-chan
- Lisa Oda as Naomi
- Shōko Nakajima as Mitsue Maehata, Hideko's mother
- Suon Kan as Fukutarō Maehata, Hideko's father
- Naozumi Masuko (Dohatsuten) as Akira Kurosawa, a film director
- Tetsuya Chiba as Yoshijirō Umezu
- Ryosuke Otani as Ryōzō Hiranuma
- Yamagen (Charcoal Zone) as Sadaharu Oh
- Mariko Tsutsui as Teruko, Ryotaro Azuma's wife
- Mitsuru Fukikoshi
- Kankurō Kudō as a taxi driver

== Production ==
- Music – Otomo Yoshihide

On November 16, 2016, NHK announced that its 58th taiga drama will be about Japan's participation in the Olympic Games from 1912 up to 1964, with Kankurō Kudō as writer and Tsuyoshi Inoue as chief director. The drama series' title, Idaten: Tokyo Orinpikku-banashi (subtitle: "A Tale of the Tokyo Olympics"), was revealed on April 4, 2017.

=== Casting ===
The main cast of the series was announced on November 1, 2017, which included Nakamura Kankurō VI, Sadao Abe, Haruka Ayase, Toma Ikuta, Hana Sugisaki, Kento Nagayama, and Ryo Katsuji among others. The second cast announcement on November 29, 2017, included Takeshi Kitano as Kokontei Shinshō V. The third cast announcement on March 30, 2018, included Tomorowo Taguchi, Yoshiko Miyazaki, Kenta Satoi, and Yō Takahashi. The fourth cast announcement on December 14, 2018, included Gen Hoshino, Tori Matsuzaka, and Yutaka Matsushige. The fifth cast announcement on March 5, 2019, included Shinobu Terajima, Yuina Kuroshima, Koharu Sugawara, Kaho, and Itsuji Itao. Two more cast announcements were done on April 24 and May 17, 2019.

On March 12, 2019, actor-musician Masanori "Pierre" Taki, who portrayed the role of tabi craftsman Shinsaku Kurosaka, was arrested in Tokyo due to his admission of drug use. This came after authorities searched his home in Setagaya Ward and tested him positive for cocaine use from a urine sample. He was eventually replaced by Hiroki Miyake in the series.

== Broadcast ==
Shiso Kanakuri Arc
Episode	Title	Directed by	Original airdate	Rating
1	"Yoakemae" (夜明け前, Before the Dawn)	Tsuyoshi Inoue	January 6, 2019	15.5%
2	"Botchan" (坊っちゃん)	Tsuyoshi Inoue	January 13, 2019	12.0%
3	"Bōken Sekai" (冒険世界)	Takegorō Nishimura	January 20, 2019	13.2%
4	"Shōben Kozō" (小便小僧, Manneken Pis)	Masae Ichiki	January 27, 2019	11.6%
5	"Ame ni mo Makezu" (雨ニモマケズ, Be not Defeated by the Rain)	Tsuyoshi Inoue	February 3, 2019	10.2%
6	"Oedo Nihonbashi" (お江戸日本橋)	Takegorō Nishimura	February 10, 2019	9.9%
7	"Okashina Futari" (おかしな二人, The Odd Couple)	Masae Ichiki	February 17, 2019	9.5%
8	"Teki wa Ikuman" (敵は幾万, Thousands of Enemies)	Tsuyoshi Inoue	February 24, 2019	9.3%
9	"Saraba Siberia Tetsudō" (さらばシベリア鉄道)	Hitoshi Ōne	March 3, 2019	9.7%
10	"Manatsu no Yo no Yume" (真夏の夜の夢, A Midsummer Night's Dream)	Takegorō Nishimura	March 10, 2019	8.7%
11	"Hyakunen no Kodoku" (百年の孤独, One Hundred Years of Solitude)	Takegorō Nishimura	March 17, 2019	8.7%
12	"Taiyō ga Ippai" (太陽がいっぱい, Purple Noon)	Masae Ichiki	March 24, 2019	9.3%
13	"Fukkatsu" (復活, Resurrection)	Tsuyoshi Inoue	March 31, 2019	8.5%
14	"Shinsekai" (新世界, New World)	Tsuyoshi Inoue and Hitoshi Ōne	April 14, 2019	9.6%
15	"Aa Kekkon" (あゝ結婚, Marriage Italian Style)	Masae Ichiki	April 21, 2019	8.7%
16	"Berlin no Kabe" (ベルリンの壁, Berlin Wall)	Hitoshi Ōne	April 28, 2019	7.1%
17	"Itsumo Futaride" (いつも2人で, Two for the Road)	Masae Ichiki	May 5, 2019	7.7%
18	"Ai no Yume" (愛の夢, Liebesträume)	Kensuke Matsuki	May 12, 2019	8.7%
19	"Hakone Ekiden" (箱根駅伝)	Hitoshi Ōne	May 19, 2019	8.7%
20	"Koi no Katamichi-Kippu" (恋の片道切符, One Way Ticket)	Hitoshi Ōne	May 26, 2019	8.6%
21	"Sakura no Sono" (櫻の園, The Cherry Orchard)	Takegorō Nishimura	June 2, 2019	8.5%
22	"Venus no Tanjō" (ヴィーナスの誕生, The Birth of Venus)	Satoshi Hayashi	June 9, 2019	6.7%
23	"Daichi" (大地, The Good Earth)	Tsuyoshi Inoue	June 16, 2019	6.9%
24	"Tane maku Hito" (種まく人, The Sower)	Masae Ichiki	June 23, 2019	7.8%
Masaji Tabata Arc
25	"Jidai wa Kawaru" (時代は変わる, The Times They Are a-Changin')	Tsuyoshi Inoue	June 30, 2019	8.6%
26	"Asu naki Bōsō" (明日なき暴走, Born to Run)	Hitoshi Ōne	July 7, 2019	7.9%
27	"Kawarime" (替り目)	Hitoshi Ōne	July 14, 2019	7.6%
28	"Hashire Daichi wo" (走れ大地を)	Tomohiro Kuwano	July 28, 2019	7.8%
29	"Yume no California" (夢のカリフォルニア, California Dreamin')	Takegorō Nishimura	August 4, 2019	7.8%
30	"Ōgon-kyō Jidai" (黄金狂時代, The Gold Rush)	Yasuko Tsuda	August 11, 2019	5.9%
31	"Top of the World" (トップ・オブ・ザ・ワールド)	Takegorō Nishimura	August 18, 2019	7.2%
32	"Dokusaisha" (独裁者, The Great Dictator)	Hitoshi Ōne	August 25, 2019	5.0%
33	"Jingi naki Tatakai" (仁義なき戦い, Battles Without Honor and Humanity)	Tomohiro Kuwano	September 1, 2019	6.6%
34	"226" (February 26 Incident)	Masae Ichiki	September 8, 2019	9.0%
35	"Minzoku no Saiten" (民族の祭典, Olympia)	Tsuyoshi Inoue	September 15, 2019	6.9%
36	"Maehata Gambare" (前畑がんばれ, Go Maehata!)	Tsuyoshi Inoue and Hitoshi Ōne	September 22, 2019	7.0%
37	"Saigo no Bansan" (最後の晩餐, The Last Supper)	Tsuyoshi Inoue	September 29, 2019	5.7%
38	"Nagai Owakare" (長いお別れ, The Long Goodbye)	Takegorō Nishimura	October 6, 2019	6.2%
39	"Natsukashi no Manshū" (懐かしの満州)	Hitoshi Ōne and Naoki Watanabe	October 13, 2019	3.7%
40	"Back to the Future" (バック・トゥ・ザ・フューチャー)	Tsuyoshi Inoue	October 27, 2019	7.0%
41	"Ore ni Tsuitekoi!" (おれについてこい！)	Masae Ichiki	November 3, 2019	6.6%
42	"Tokyo Nagaremono" (東京流れ者, Tokyo Drifter)	Takashi Kitano	November 10, 2019	6.3%
43	"Help!" (ヘルプ！)	Yasuko Tsuda	November 17, 2019	6.1%
44	"Boku tachi no Shippai" (ぼくたちの失敗, Our Mistake)	Hitoshi Ōne	November 24, 2019	6.1%
45	"Hi no Tori" (火の鳥, The Firebird)	Masae Ichiki	December 1, 2019	6.1%
46	"Honō no Runner" (炎のランナー, Chariots of Fire)	Takegorō Nishimura	December 8, 2019	6.9%
47	"Jikan yo Tomare" (時間よ止まれ)	Tsuyoshi Inoue	December 15, 2019	8.3%
Average rating 8.2% - Rating is based on Japanese Video Research (Kantō region).

=== Omnibus ===
Episode	Title	Original airdate	Original airtime
1	Part 1	December 30, 2019	13:05 - 14:15
1	Part 2	December 30, 2019	14:15 - 15:20
2	Part 1	December 30, 2019	15:25 - 16:36
2	Part 2	December 30, 2019	16:36 - 17:40

=== International version ===
Title	Platform	Narrated by	Era
Episode 1	NHK World - Video on Demand	Patrick Harlan	1909–1912
Episode 2	NHK World - Video on Demand	Patrick Harlan	1912–1915
Episode 3	NHK World - Video on Demand	Patrick Harlan	1915–1933
Episode 4	NHK World - Video on Demand	Patrick Harlan	1933–1936
Episode 5	NHK World - Video on Demand	Patrick Harlan	1938–1962
Episode 6	NHK World - Video on Demand	Patrick Harlan	1962–1967

== Home media ==
The first 13 episodes and 11 succeeding episodes of Idaten were released in separate Blu-ray box sets in Japan on April 24, 2020. DVD edition box sets were also released on the same day. Episodes 25 to 36 and 37 to 47 were later released in separate Blu-ray box sets as well on May 22, 2020, along with their respective DVD versions.

== Soundtracks ==
- Idaten Taiga Drama Original Soundtrack (Release date: March 6, 2019)
- Idaten Taiga Drama Original Soundtrack Part Two (Release date: July 24, 2019)
- Idaten Taiga Drama Original Soundtrack Final (Release date: November 20, 2019)

== Awards and nominations ==
Year	Award	Category	Result	Ref.
2020	13th Tokyo Drama Awards	Best Drama Series	Won	

== See also ==
- 2020 Summer Olympics
