= Shitennoji Junior and Senior High School =

Private girls' school in Osaka, Japan

Coordinates: 34.6544°N 135.5148°E

- 四天王寺中学校・高等学校
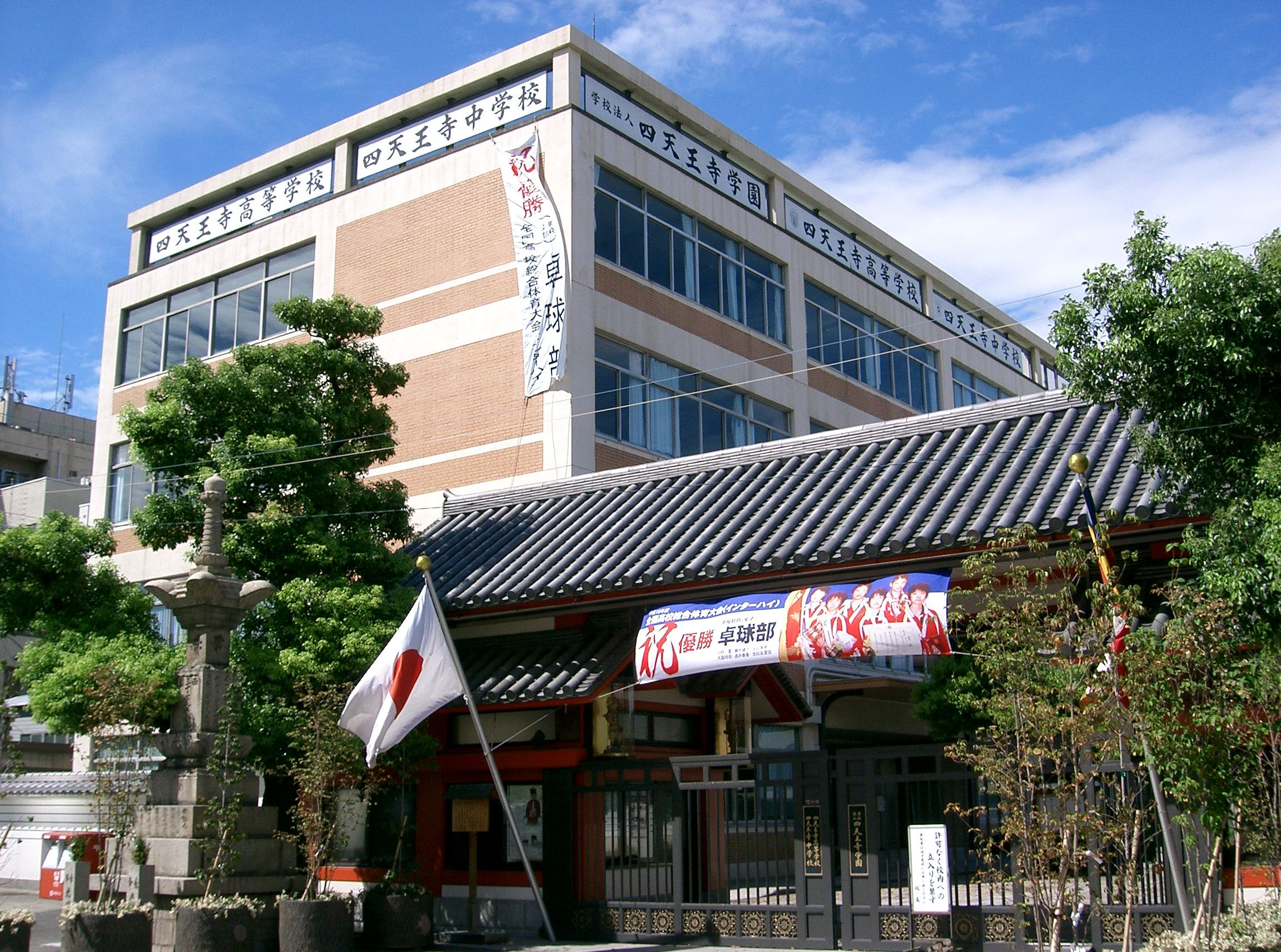
- The school in 2007

Information
- Religious affiliation: Buddhism
- Established: 1922; 104 years ago
- Website: www.shitennoji.ed.jp/stnnj/

Shitennoji Junior and Senior High School (四天王寺中学校・高等学校, Shitennōji Chūgakkō Kōtōgakkō) is a girls' private junior and senior high school in Tennoji-ku, Osaka. It is a part of the Shi-Tennoji Gakuen, a group of Buddhist educational institutions affiliated with Shitennoji temple in Osaka.

It was established in April 1922 as Tennoji Women's High School (天王寺高等女学校, Tennōji Kōtōjogakkō).

== Notable alumnae ==
=== Actresses ===
- Yoko Akino
- Mitsuki Takahata
- Reon Yuzuki

=== Synchronized swimmers ===
- Miho Takeda
- Fumiko Okuno
- Miya Tachibana
- Mayuko Fujiki
- Yoko Yoneda

=== Volleyball players ===
- Katsumi Matsumura
- Kinuko Tanida
- Sata Isobe
- Yoshiko Matsumura
- Michiko Shiokawa
- Sachiko Otani
- Kiyomi Sakamoto
- Mariko Mori

=== Table tennis players ===
- Kasumi Ishikawa
- Yukie Ozeki
- An Konishi
- Reiko Sakamoto
- Hiroko Fujii
- Ai Fujinuma
- Haruna Fukuoka
- Reiko Hiura

=== Handball players ===
- Mineko Tanaka
- Mika Nagata
- Yui Sunami
- Asuka Fujita
- Sato Shiroishi

=== Other ===
- Kumiko Ogura, badminton player
- Aya Tamaki, badminton player
- Yoriko Okamoto, taekwondo practitioner
- Midori Ito, figure skater
