= Oriental Witches =

Japanese volleyball team

Nichibo Kaizuka
- Full name: Women's Volleyball Team at Kaizuka factory of Dai Nippon Spinning Co., Ltd.
- Nickname: Oriental Witches
- Captain: Masae Kasai
- Championships: (gold) at 1964 Summer Olympics; (gold) at 1962 World Championship; (silver) at 1960 World Championship

Uniforms
Home	Away

Oriental Witches (東洋の魔女, Tōyō no Majo) is the well-known nickname of Nichibo Kaizuka, a factory volleyball team of Dai Nippon Spinning Co., Ltd. (later, Nichibo, thereafter, Unitika) in Kaizuka, Osaka given by the reports of European media when they achieved 24 consecutive victories against other national teams on the expedition to Europe.

== Overview ==
On November 27, 1953, Dai Nippon Spinning Co., Ltd. (later, Unitika) determined to establish the women's volleyball team at its factory in Kaizuka, Osaka. Hirofumi Daimatsu who brought up players who later came to be called "Oriental Witches" became the coach. On March 15, 1954, the women's volleyball team, commonly called "Nichibo Kaizuka", was established at the factory in Kaizuka, based on Daimatsu's goal, "To become No. 1 team in Japan in 2 years". At the time of establishment, the team which consisted mostly of fresh graduates could shine only in small tournaments but could barely come 8th place in the national competitions.

Strenuous practice began to pay off and in 1955 the team won the first victory in All-Japan Women's Corporate nine-player Volleyball Championship and also won the victory in the National Sports Festival of Japan. In total the team won three titles.

In 1958, the team assumed the hegemony in five tournaments, which no team could accomplish previously. Daimatsu, who dominated national tournaments, turned his eyes upon the world, but the difference between the nine-player system and six-player system was significant. Japan had been adopting the nine-player system. On the other hand, the international rules required the six-player system. Daimatsu had to think it over. In 1958, Nichibo Kaizuka switched from the nine-person system to six-person system. The team aimed for the 1960 FIVB Volleyball Women's World Championship and continued strenuous practice.

In the 1960 FIVB Volleyball Women's World Championship, Japan took second place.

On the trip to Europe in 1961, Nichibo Kaizuka won 24 consecutive victories against other national teams. Then European media recognised its achievement, reporting on the team as worldwide heroines and gave Nichibo Kaizuka the nickname "Oriental Witches".

In 1962 FIVB Volleyball Women's World Championship, how competitive Japan's national team, which was composed of all Nichibo Kaizuka players but two and already feared as the "Oriental Witches", could be against Soviet Union was in focus. By using the kaiten reshību method of rotating on the court and receiving the ball, Japan took first place. Few thought that this would happen again.

After the 1962 FIVB Volleyball Women's World Championship the team traveled around the world as a reward for winning. As most of team members were of marriageable age, they, including Daimatsu, were thinking of retirement.

Volleyball became an official event as of the 1964 Summer Olympics. Japan Volleyball Association asked the team to continue and fans sent Hirofumi Daimatsu about 5,000 letters asking for the team to continue. The team leader Masae Kasai made up her mind as they had two years left until the 1964 Tokyo Olympics; with just the phrase "Follow me" by Daimatsu, the members of Oriental Witches decided to continue to play. Thereafter, for two years they worked for the company all morning and practiced from 15:00 until 26:00. Daimatsu worked until 16:00 and joined practice afterwards.

On October 23, 1964, Japan faced off against the Soviet Union at the Tokyo Olympics. Japan took two sets smoothly but the persistence of the Soviet Union continued after Japan reached the match point. The play-by-play announcer Bunya Suzuki repeated the phrase, "Gold Medal Point" six times. Finally because of an overnet foul by the Soviet Union, Japan won.

The following players represented Japan in the 1964 Tokyo Olympics.

- Players who belonged to Nichibo Kaizuka:
1. Masae Kasai
2. Emiko Miyamoto
3. Kinuko Tanida
4. Yuriko Handa
5. Yoshiko Matsumura
6. Sata Isobe
7. Katsumi Matsumura
8. Yoko Shinozaki
9. Setsuko Sasaki
10. Yuko Fujimoto
- Player who belonged to Kurashiki Spinning:
1. Masako Kondo
- Player who belonged to Yashica:
1. Ayano Shibuki

== Gallery ==
Oriental Witches
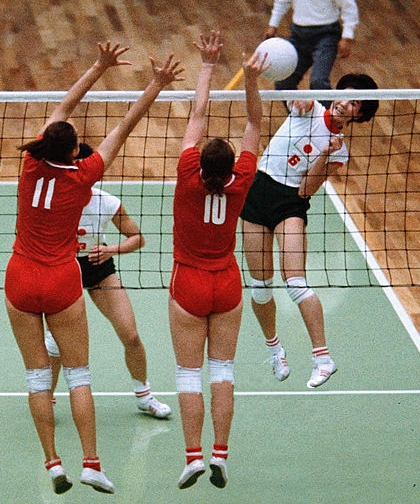
Sata Isobe at the 1964 Tokyo Olympics

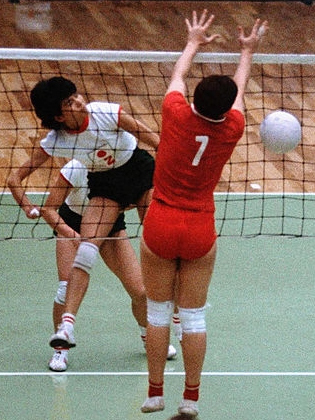
Emiko Miyamoto at the 1964 Tokyo Olympics

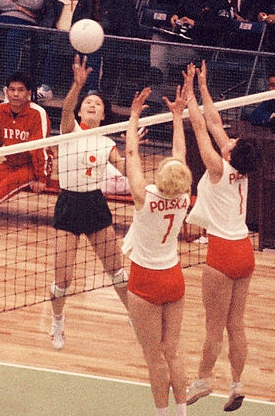
Yuriko Handa at the 1964 Tokyo Olympics

== See also ==
- The Witches of the Orient
- Kurowashiki All Japan Volleyball Tournament
- V.League (Japanese Volleyball League)
