= Sailing at the 1964 Summer Olympics – 5.5 Metre =

Sailing at the Olympics

5.5 Metre at the Games of the XVIII Olympiad
- Venue: Enoshima
- Competitors: 45 from 15 nations
- Teams: 65

Medalists
1st place, gold medalist(s)		Bill Northam; Peter O'Donnell; James Sargeant	Australia
2nd place, silver medalist(s)		Lars Thorn; Sture Stork; Arne Karlsson	Sweden
3rd place, bronze medalist(s)		John J. McNamara; Francis Scully; Joseph Batchelder	United States

The 5.5 Metre was a sailing event on the Sailing at the 1964 Summer Olympics program in Enoshima. Seven races were scheduled. 45 sailors, on 15 boats, from 15 nations competed.

== Results ==
Rank	Helmsman (Country)	Crew	Yachtname	Sail No.	Race I		Race II		Race III		Race IV		Race V		Race VI		Race VII		Total Points	Total -1
Rank	Helmsman (Country)	Crew	Yachtname	Sail No.	Rank	Points	Rank	Points	Rank	Points	Rank	Points	Rank	Points	Rank	Points	Rank	Points	Total Points	Total -1
1st place, gold medalist(s)	Bill Northam (AUS)	Peter O'Donnell; James Sargeant	Barrenjoey	KA; 14	1	1277	6	499	2	976	1	1277	~~DNF~~	~~101~~	1	1277	4	675	6082	5981
2nd place, silver medalist(s)	Lars Thorn (SWE)	Arne Karlsson; Sture Stork	Rush VII	S 37	~~4~~	~~675~~	4	675	4	675	4	675	1	1277	4	675	1	1277	5929	5254
3rd place, bronze medalist(s)	John J. McNamara (USA)	Joseph Batchelder; Francis Scully	Bingo	US; 50	10	277	1	1277	1	1277	6	499	2	976	3	800	~~DNF~~	~~101~~	5207	5106
4	Agostino Straulino (ITA)	Bruno Petronio; Massimo Minervin	Grifone	I 42	2	976	2	976	3	800	~~11~~	~~236~~	7	432	2	976	5	578	4974	4738
5	Fritz Kopperschmidt (EUA)	Herbert Reich; Eckart Wagner	Subbnboana	G 12	14	131	8	374	6	499	~~DNF~~	~~101~~	4	675	5	578	3	800	3158	3057
6	Johan Gullichsen (FIN)	Peter Fazer; Juhani Salovaara	Chaje II	L 24	6	499	5	578	~~9~~	~~323~~	5	578	5	578	8	374	7	432	3362	3039
7	Sandy MacDonald (CAN)	Douglas Woodward; Bernard Skinner	State VI	KC; 58	~~13~~	~~163~~	3	800	5	578	9	323	9	323	7	432	6	499	3118	2955
8	HrH Crownprince Harald (NOR)	Eirik Johannessen; Stein Føyen	Fram III	N 27	7	432	9	323	7	432	2	976	~~10~~	~~277~~	9	323	8	374	3137	2860
9	Robert Symonette (BAH)	Roy Ramsay; Percy Knowles	John B	BA; 1	9	323	~~13~~	~~163~~	11	236	3	800	3	800	10	277	10	277	2876	2713
10	Paul Ramelet (SUI)	Roger Rouge; Jean Graul	Alain IV	Z 45	3	800	DNF	101	13	163	~~DSQ~~	~~0~~	11	236	12	198	2	976	2474	2474
11	Robin Aisher (GBR)	Eric Denham; Adrian Jardine	Yeoman XII	K 12	8	374	~~10~~	~~277~~	8	374	8	374	6	499	6	499	9	323	2720	2443
12	William Berntsen (DEN)	Carl Christian Lassen; Per Holm	Web III	D 11	5	578	7	432	12	198	10	277	8	374	~~13~~	~~163~~	11	236	2258	2095
13	Konstantin Alexandrov (URS)	Konstantin Melgunov; Valentin Zamotaikin	Druzhba	SR; 1	11	236	11	217	10	277	7	432	~~12~~	~~198~~	11	236	12	198	1794	1596
14	Fujiya Matsumoto (JPN)	Masao Yoshida; Takeshi Hagiwara	Roy	J 1	12	198	11	217	~~14~~	~~131~~	12	198	13	163	14	131	13	163	1201	1070
15	Víctor de la Lama (MEX)	Iker Belausteguigoitía; Luis Aguilar	Xolotl	MX; 1	~~15~~	~~101~~	14	131	15	101	13	163	14	131	15	101	14	131	859	758

DNF = Did Not Finish, DNS= Did Not Start, DSQ = Disqualified
= Male, = Female

=== Daily standings ===
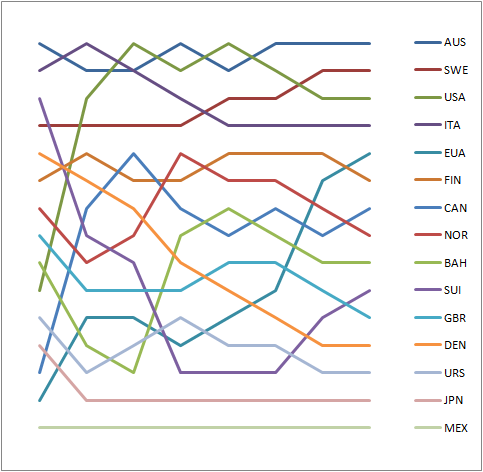
Graph showing the daily standings in the 5.5 Metre during the 1964 Summer Olympics

== Conditions at Enoshima ==
Of the total of three race areas were needed during the Olympics in Enoshima. Each of the classes was using the same scoring system. The Easterly course area was used for the 5.5 Metre.

Date	Race	Weather	Wind direction	Wind speed (m/s)
12 October 1964	I	Cloudy	ENE	0.4
13 October 1964	II	Cloudy	NNE	5.5
14 October 1964	III	Cloudy	N	12
15 October 1964	IV	Fine	N	8
19 October 1964	V	Cloudy	N	4.5
20 October 1964	VI	Fine	NNE	12
21 October 1964	VII	Cloudy	S	11
