= Teshima (surname) =

Teshima is a Japanese surname that may refer to

- Alice Sae Teshima Noda (1894–1964), American businesswoman, dental hygienist and beauty industry entrepreneur
- Aoi Teshima (born 1987), Japanese singer and voice actress
- Ikurō Teshima (1910–1973), Japanese religious leader
- Kazuki Teshima (born 1979), Japanese football player
- Keiko Teshima (born 1980), Japanese judoka
- Nami Teshima (born 1974), female Japanese judoka
- Shiro Teshima (1907–1982), Japanese football player
- Takeshi Teshima (born 1941), Japanese fencer
- Taichi Teshima (born 1968), Japanese golfer
- Toshimitsu Teshima (born 1942), Japanese cyclist
- Yusuke Teshima, Japanese motorcycle racer
