= Weightlifting at the 1964 Summer Olympics – Men's 75 kg =

Weightlifting at the Olympics

Men's 75 kg at the Games of the XVIII Olympiad
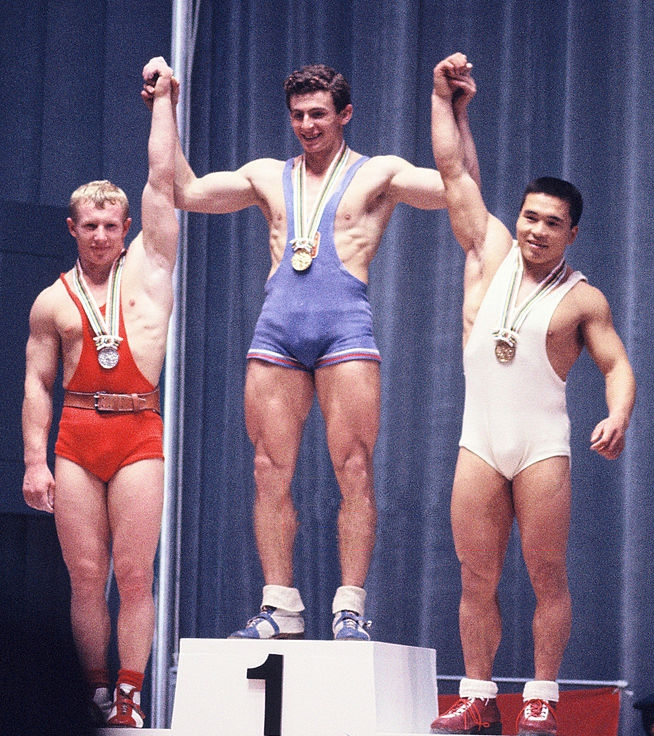
- Medal winners
- Venue: Shibuya Public Hall
- Date: 14 October 1964
- Competitors: 19 from 17 nations
- Winning total: 445.0 kg WR

Medalists
1st place, gold medalist(s)		Hans Zdražila	Czechoslovakia
2nd place, silver medalist(s)		Viktor Kurentsov	Soviet Union
3rd place, bronze medalist(s)		Masushi Ouchi	Japan

The men's 75 kg weightlifting competitions at the 1964 Summer Olympics in Tokyo took place on 14 October at the Shibuya Public Hall. It was the tenth appearance of the middleweight class.

== Results ==
Rank	Name	Country	kg
1	Hans Zdražila	Czechoslovakia	445.0
2	Viktor Kurentsov	Soviet Union	440.0
3	Masushi Ouchi	Japan	437.5
4	Lee Jong-sup	South Korea	432.5
5	Sadahiro Miwa	Japan	422.5
6	Mihály Huszka	Hungary	420.0
7	Rolf Maier	France	417.5
8	Velichko Konarov	Bulgaria	415.0
9	Víctor Ángel Pagán	Puerto Rico	415.0
10	Mohammed Nadum	Iraq	407.5
11	Tan Howe Liang	Malaysia	400.0
12	Chao Cheng-hsueng	Chinese Taipei	397.5
13	Pierre St.-Jean	Canada	395.0
14	Mike Pearman	Great Britain	387.5
15	Pe Aye	Burma	385.0
16	Joseph Haydar	Australia	375.0
17	Abderrahim Tazi	Morocco	355.0
AC	Werner Dittrich	United Team of Germany	135.0
AC	Heo Chang-beom	South Korea	255.0
