= Grzegorz Wagner =

Polish volleyball player and coach

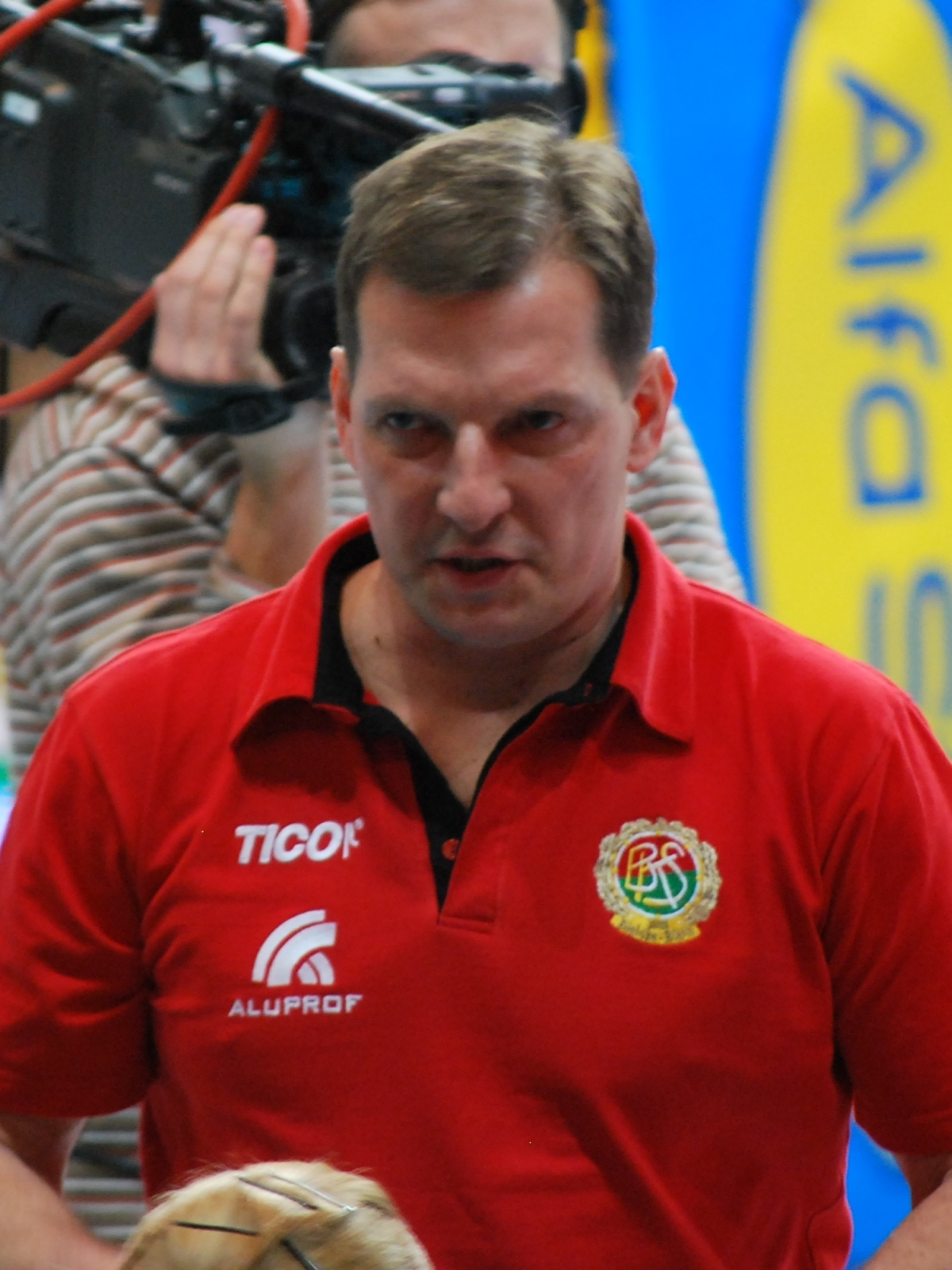

Personal information
- Nationality: Polish
- Born: 13 December 1965 (age 60); Warsaw, Poland
- Height: 1.82 m (6 ft 0 in)

Coaching information
Previous teams coached
| Years | Teams |
|---|---|
| 2005–2006; 2006–2009; 2009–2010; 2010–2011; 2011–2012 | Jadar Radom; BBTS Bielsko-Biała; AZS Częstochowa; BKS Bielsko-Biała; Fart Kielce |

Volleyball information
- Position: Setter

Career
| Years | Teams |
|---|---|
| 1981; 1982–1984; 1984–1985; 1985–1986; 1988–1991; 1992–1993; 1993–1997; 1998–1999; 1999–2000; 2000–2001; 2001–2002; 2002–2004; 2004–2005 | Legia Warsaw; MKS MDK Warsaw; Resursa Łódź; Hutnik Kraków; Hutnik Kraków; BBTS Bielsko-Biała; Desimpel Torhout; BBTS Bielsko-Biała; Jastrzębie Borynia; BBTS Bielsko-Biała; AZS Częstochowa; Płomień Sosnowiec; BBTS Bielsko-Biała |

National team
| 1985–2002 | Poland (64) |

Grzegorz Wagner (born 13 December 1965) is a Polish former volleyball player and coach. He was part of the Polish national team in 1985–2002, Polish Champion (1989).

== Personal life ==
His parents are Danuta Kordaczuk and Hubert Wagner. His mother was a volleyball player (setter), bronze medalist of Olympics 1964, medalist of World Championship and European Championship. His father Hubert was also a volleyball player (also setter), bronze medalist of the European Championship 1967, as head coach led the Polish men's national volleyball team to titles of World Champions 1974 and Olympic Champions 1976.

He is married to Agata (née Marszałek), a former volleyball player. He has two sons - Iwo (born 1991) and Jakub (born 1993) and daughter Sara (born 2003). Both of his sons are volleyball players.

== Career as coach ==
He debuted as head coach of Jadar Radom in 2005. His team was promoted to the top of Polish volleyball league - PlusLiga. In 2006 he joined to BBTS Bielsko-Biała, club from the I league. In season 2009/2010 he was a head coach of AZS Częstochowa and his team took 5th place in PlusLiga. In 2010/2011 he was a head coach of women's club BKS Aluprof Bielsko-Biała.
