= Masae =

- Gender: Female

Origin
- Origin: Japanese
- Meaning: Different meanings depending on the kanji used

Masae (written: 昌江, 昌枝, 政江 or 雅恵) is a feminine Japanese given name. Notable people with the name include:

- Masae Aida (会田 昌江; 1920-2015), Japanese actress known as Setsuko Hara
- Masae Kasai (河西 昌枝; 1933–2013), Japanese volleyball player
- Masae Komiya (born 1975), Japanese goalball player
- Masae Suzuki (鈴木 政江; born 1957), Japanese footballer and manager
- Masae Ueno (上野 雅恵; born 1979), Japanese judoka
