= Maria Śliwka =

Polish volleyball player (1935–1997)

Personal information
- Full name: Maria Śliwka (later Serkiz, later Pankowa)
- Nationality: Polish
- Born: 7 December 1935; Biłgoraj, Poland
- Died: 30 March 1997 (aged 61); Wrocław, Poland
- Height: 1.68 m (5 ft 6 in)

National team
1957–1964	Poland (118)
Honours
Women's volleyball
Representing Poland
Olympic Games
Bronze medal – third place	1964 Tokyo
World Championship
Bronze medal – third place	1962 Soviet Union
European Championship
Silver medal – second place	1963 Romania
Bronze medal – third place	1958 Czechoslovakia
- Last updated: 26 June 2015

Maria Śliwka (born Serkiz, later Panek, later Śliwka, on 7 December 1930 - 30 March 1997) was a Polish volleyball player. She was a member of Poland women's national volleyball team in 1957–1964, a bronze medalist of the Olympic Games Tokyo 1964, a bronze medalist of the World Championship 1962 and medalist of the European Championship (silver in 1963, bronze in 1958).

== Career as player ==
=== National team ===
Her first medal she won bronze of European Championship 1958 held in Czechoslovakia. In 1962 she won bronze medal of World Championship, and one year later silver of European Championship 1963. In 1964 she took part in Olympic Games Tokyo 1964. She played in all five matches and Poland, including Śliwka, won bronze medal in the Olympic tournament. Śliwka played in national team 118 times.
