= Danuta Kordaczuk =

Polish volleyball player

Personal information
- Full name: Danuta Kordaczuk-Wagner
- Nationality: Polish
- Born: 2 September 1939; Warsaw, Poland
- Died: 10 April 1988 (aged 48); Warsaw, Poland
- Height: 1.66 m (5 ft 5 in)

Volleyball information
- Position: Setter

Career
Teams
	(Poland) Zryw Wrocław (Poland) Impel Wrocław (Poland) Legia Warszawa

National team
1956–1970	Poland (164)
Honours
Women's volleyball
Representing Poland
Olympic Games
Bronze medal – third place	1964 Tokyo
World Championship
Bronze medal – third place	1956 France
Bronze medal – third place	1962 Soviet Union
European Championship
Silver medal – second place	1963 Romania
Bronze medal – third place	1958 Czechoslovakia
- Last updated: 18 June 2015

Danuta Kordaczuk-Wagner (2 September 1939 – 10 April 1988) was a Polish volleyball player and head coach, a member of Poland women's national volleyball team in 1956–1970, a bronze medalist of the Olympic Games Tokyo 1964, a bronze medalist of the World Championship (1956, 1962) and medalist of the European Championship (silver in 1963, bronze in 1958).

== Personal life ==
She was born in Warsaw, Poland on 2 September 1939, the second day after the outbreak of World War II in Poland. On 15 October 1963 she married Hubert Wagner, volleyball player and head coach of Polish men's national volleyball team, which he led to titles of World Champions 1974 and Olympic Champions 1976. On 13 December 1965 she gave birth to their son Grzegorz, who was also volleyball player (also as setter like his parents). In 1978 she got divorced. She died on 10 April 1988 in Warszawa.

== Career as player ==
=== National team ===
Her first medal – bronze, with Poland women's national volleyball team, she achieved at World Championship 1956 in France. Then she won bronze of European Championship 1958 held in Czechoslovakia. In 1962, she won bronze medal of World Championship, and one year later silver of European Championship 1963. In 1964, she took part in Olympic Games Tokyo 1964. She played in all five matches and Poland, including Kordaczuk, won bronze medal in the Olympic tournament. Kordaczuk was considered as one of the best setters in the world and she played on the national team 164 times.

== Sporting achievements ==
=== Clubs ===
==== National championship ====
- 1957/1958 Polish Championship, with Impel Wrocław
- 1959/1960 Polish Championship, with Impel Wrocław
- 1960/1961 Polish Championship, with Legia Warszawa
- 1961/1962 Polish Championship, with Legia Warszawa
- 1962/1963 Polish Championship, with Legia Warszawa
- 1963/1964 Polish Championship, with Legia Warszawa
- 1964/1965 Polish Championship, with Legia Warszawa
- 1966/1967 Polish Championship, with Legia Warszawa
- 1967/1968 Polish Championship, with Legia Warszawa
- 1968/1969 Polish Championship, with Legia Warszawa
- 1969/1970 Polish Championship, with Legia Warszawa
- 1970/1971 Polish Championship, with Legia Warszawa
- 1971/1972 Polish Championship, with Legia Warszawa
