= Velichko Konarov =

Bulgarian weightlifter

Personal information
- Nationality: Bulgarian
- Born: 22 January 1940 (age 85)

Sport
- Sport: Weightlifting

Velichko Konarov (Bulgarian: Величко Конаров, born 22 January 1940) is a Bulgarian weightlifter. He competed in the men's middleweight event at the 1964 Summer Olympics.
