= Pe Aye =

Burmese weightlifter

Personal information
- Nationality: Burmese
- Born: 10 October 1936 (age 88)

Sport
- Sport: Weightlifting

Pe Aye (born 10 October 1936) is a Burmese weightlifter. He competed in the men's middleweight event at the 1964 Summer Olympics.
