= Heinz Junga =

German swimmer

Personal information
- Born: 22 June 1943 (age 83) Berlin, Germany
- Height: 182 cm (6 ft 0 in)
- Weight: 75 kg (165 lb)

Sport
- Sport: Swimming
- Club: SC Dynamo Berlin (East Berlin)

Heinz Junga (born 22 June 1943) is a German former freestyle swimmer. He competed in the men's 1500 metre freestyle at the 1964 Summer Olympics.
