= Bill Farley =

American swimmer and coach (1944–2018)

- Around 60, Fairfield U. staff photo

Personal information
- Full name: William Winfield Farley
- Nickname: "Bill"
- National team: United States
- Born: November 10, 1944 Fort Devens, Massachusetts, U.S.
- Died: September 2, 2018 (aged 73) Sacramento, California, U.S.
- Height: 6 ft 1 in (1.85 m)
- Weight: 176 lb (80 kg)
- Coaching career

Playing career
- 1964-1967: University of Michigan
- Position: freestyle

Coaching career (HC unless noted)
- 1969-79: Princeton University
- 1979-80: University of Michigan
- 1999-2002: Punahou Aquatics; Honolulu, Hawaii
- 2002-2014: Fairfield University

Head coaching record
- Overall: 275-79, .776 win Percentage (Princeton era)

Accomplishments and honors

Championships
- 6 x Eastern Seaboard Championships; 5 x Ivy League Conference titles (Princeton Men) 2 x Eastern Seaboard Championships; 3rd place, '73 National Championships (Princeton Women)

Awards
- 2 x NCAA Public Recognition Award; CSCAA Team Scholar Honors (Fairfield U. Men and Women's Teams)

Sport
- Sport: Swimming
- Strokes: Freestyle
- Club: Los Angeles Athletic Club (LAAC)
- College team: University of Michigan
- Coach: Peter Daland (LAAC); Gus Stager (Michigan)

William Winfield Farley (November 10, 1944 – September 2, 2018) was a 1964 Tokyo Olympic competitor in the 1500-meter event, and an All-American competition swimmer specializing in distance freestyle events for the University of Michigan. He worked as an American businessman in the Philippines, Tokyo and Hawaii, and served as a swimming coach for over 25 years, best known for leading Princeton Varsity Men's swimming to six Eastern Seaboard championships and five Ivy League titles from 1969-1979.

== Early life and swimming ==
Farley was born on November 10, 1944, in Fort Devon, Massachusetts, the son of William C. Farley. After moving West, he attended and graduated from St. Francis High School in La Canada, California, about 15 miles North of Los Angeles, and was required to find swim clubs to compete, as St. Francis had no swim team. He began swimming around 14 in 1958 at Los Coyotes Country Club, and a year later signed up to compete as a junior at the Club under Coach Art Winters. By 14, Farley was swimming the 50-yard freestyle in 27.1 seconds, and his coach was predicting he could shave his 100-yard freestyle time to 53 seconds as a 17-year-old High School Senior. He participated in a variety of sports, and having shown promise by the age of 15, began swimming for the nationally recognized Los Angeles Athletic Club (LAAC), managed by legendary Hall of Fame Coach Peter Daland.

=== Competing for LAAC ===
In late August 1962, swimming for the Los Angeles Athletic Club (LAAC), Farley placed fourth in the 400-meter freestyle in a Far Western Competition at the Foothill College Pool in Los Altos Hill, California, South of San Francisco, in 4:29.6, helping to lead LAAC to a team victory. Several records were set. World record holder in the 200-meter butterfly, Sharon Finneran, and 1960 Swimming Olympian Donna DeVarona, were participants.

Competing against the nation's best at 17, on July 28, 1962, Farley finished third in what would become his signature event, the 1500-meter free, in 18:06.3, at the Los Angeles Invitational behind first-place fellow LAAC swimmer and 4-time Olympic Gold medalist Murray Rose, the 1956 Olympic Gold Medal winner in the event. The second place finisher, Don Schollander, was a 1964 four-time Olympic Gold Medalist.

=== Pan-American Games ===
At 18 in 1963, Farley finished fourth at the Pan American Games in his signature event, the 1500-meter freestyle, in Brasilia, Brazil.

== Swimming for U of Michigan ==
Farley attended the University of Michigan, and swam for the Michigan Wolverines swimming and diving team in National Collegiate Athletic Association (NCAA) competition from around 1962 to 1966, where he specialized in distance events and was mentored by Hall of Fame Head Coach Gus Stager. He was a ten-time All-American as a college swimmer. As a sophomore, he took conference records in the 500 and 1,650-yard freestyle titles, and took a conference record in the 200 freestyle as well. He later took a second in the 1,650 to team mate and Olympian Carl Robie Farley was named as an All American in 1964, 1965, and 1966, and graduated from the University of Michigan around 1967. He then earned a Masters from Eastern Michigan in Education in 1969.

=== 1964 Tokyo Olympics ===
As one of the high-points of his swimming career, Farley represented the United States at the 1964 Summer Olympics in Tokyo. He advanced to the event final of the men's 1,500-meter freestyle, and finished fourth overall with a time of 17:18.2. His LAAC swimming competitor, and companion Murray Rose, had competed twice in the 1500 as an Olympian. Farley completed his 1500, only 11 seconds behind bronze medalist Alan Wood.

== Swimming coach ==
In one of his earliest coaching positions, Farley coached at Ann Arbor Swim Club while still at Ann Arbor. In one of his first positions coaching a college team, immediately after completing his MS in Education, he served at Princeton from 1969 beginning as a Freshman coach at twenty-four, and remaining through 1979 as a Varsity Coach.

He returned to coach at his alma mater Michigan from 1979-81.

=== Coaching Princeton ===
In 1974, he led Princeton swimming to an 8-4 dual meet record with strong assistance by diver Billy Heinz and distance swimmer Joe Loughran who led the team in scoring that year, and helped the Tigers place 13th at the NCAA Championships in Long Beach, California. While coaching the Princeton Men's Varsity from 1970–79, he led the Tigers to six consecutive Eastern Seaboard Championships, as well as five titles in the Ivy League Conference. During his Princeton era, he earned a record in dual meets of 275-79, a noteworthy .776 winning percentage. Bill mentored a number of All American swimmers, eight finalists in NCAA competition. Among his best-known swimmers was NCAA Champion, and 1971 Pan American Games Gold Medal Winner Charlie Campbell of the class of 1973.

As he coached the team nearly from its inception, Farley's success with the Women's varsity may have been even more noteworthy. In the four years from 1971 to 1975, he took the Women's team to two Eastern Championships and received a third place standing in the 1973 National Championships.

=== Coaching Michigan ===
While coaching at Michigan from 1979-1981, he mentored 1980 Olympic hopeful Fernando Canales of Puerto Rico, one of his more exceptional swimmers. Canales represented Puerto Rico at the 1976 Summer Olympics. In 1978, Canales won five gold medals in the Central American Championships, and set records in the 100 and 200-meter freestyle while at Michigan. During his short span at Michigan, Farley had an overall record of 23-5 and had eight swimmers on the NCAA All-American Team.

== Management and executive positions, 1984-94 ==
After leaving Michigan as a swim coach, he served as Aquatics and Gymnastics Director at the Philippine's International School of Manilla, where he coached swimming, and managed aquatics and gymnastics programs for a student body of over 1,800, and had supervisory responsibility for 10 teachers and coaches. During these years he also served as President of the Philippine International Association from 1984-1989. He was Tokyo American Club's Recreation Director in Japan from 1989-1994. After relocating to Hawaii he became the owner and operator for Shave Ice Paradise and Old Hanalei Coffee Company.

=== Returning to swim coaching ===
In 1999-2002 Farley returned to coaching swimming, at Honolulu's Punahou School's associated Punahou Aquatics, an old and established competitive swimming program dating back to 1911, with a new Olympic-sized pool as part of the Pratt Aquatic Center completed around 1981. While coaching in Hawaii in September 2000, at age 55, Farley placed second in the 55-59 age group at Honolulu's 2.5 mile Waikiki Roughwater Swim with a time of 1:08.32.

Returning to the continental United States, he then coached for ten years at Fairfield University in Fairfield, Connecticut from 2002-2014, and made a strong impact on the team's success in competition.

=== Coaching at Fairfield University, 2002-2014 ===
At Fairfield, Farley was recognized by the school as the most accomplished coach in program history. In 2011-12, he earned his 100th career victory at Fairfield during a meet on February 4, 2012. Farley established himself as Fairfield's coach with the most wins for both the men's and women's teams during the 2007-08 year. Demonstrating the exceptional performance and speed of his swimmers, all thirty-seven of the women's college swimming records and all but one of the men's 37 school swimming records were broken and reset during Farley's tenure.

In 2008-9, Farley led freshman swimmer Michelle Yoshida to conference titles in three Metro Atlantic Athletic Conference (MAAC) freestyle events; the 50, 100, and 200 free. Yoshida set conference records in each event becoming Fairfield's first triple champion. By her Sophomore year at Fairfield, Michelle had broken fifteen school records. Farley had earlier coached her at Punahou Aquatics, where she had graduated in 2008. Yoshida repeated in 2010 as a triple champion, and took two additional MAAC golds in 2011, which included a record-setting in the 100-back. In her final MAAC championship, she took a gold and two silvers.

Farley died at his home in Sacramento, California on September 2, 2018. He was survived by a son and daughter and two grandchildren.

== See also ==
- List of University of Michigan alumni
