= Paul Ramelet =

Swiss sailor

Personal information
- Nationality: Swiss
- Born: 27 November 1909
- Died: 17 December 2002 (aged 93)

Sport
- Sport: Sailing

Paul Ramelet (27 November 1909 – 17 December 2002) was a Swiss sailor. He competed in the 5.5 Metre event at the 1964 Summer Olympics.
