= Ricardo Morello =

Argentine swimmer

Personal information
- Born: 6 July 1943 (age 83)
- Height: 185 cm (6 ft 1 in)
- Weight: 85 kg (187 lb)

Sport
- Sport: Swimming

Ricardo Morello (born 6 July 1943) is a former swimmer from Argentina. He competed in the men's 1500 metre freestyle at the 1964 Summer Olympics.
