= The Witches of the Orient =

- Directed by: Julien Faraut
- Release date: 28 July 2021; (French cinemas)
- Country: France

Les Sorcières de l’Orient or The Witches of the Orient is a 2021 French documentary film about the Oriental Witches 1960s Japanese volleyball team. The film also includes footage from the Japanese animated television series Attack No. 1.

== Release ==
The film was shown in British cinemas from 16 July 2021.

== Reception ==
Professional ratings
Review scores
Source	Rating
The Guardian	4/5 stars
Radio Times	3/5 stars

The film was reviewed in The Guardian, The Financial Times, The New York Times, the Los Angeles Times, Sight and Sound, Screen International, the Radio Times, Variety, Japan Forward, International Examiner and La Croix.

== Production ==
Julien Faraut had seen Attacker You!
