= Carl Christian Lassen =

Danish sailor

Personal information
- Full name: Aage Carl Christian Lassen
- Nationality: Danish
- Born: 9 January 1943 (age 83) Copenhagen, Denmark
- Height: 181 cm (5 ft 11 in)
- Weight: 62 kg (137 lb)

Sailing career
- Sport: Sailing
- Club: Royal Danish Yacht Club
- Class: 5.5 Metre

Aage Carl Christian Lassen (born 9 January 1943) is a Danish sailor. He competed in the 5.5 Metre event at the 1964 Summer Olympics.
