= Volkmar Würtz =

German fencer

Personal information
- Born: 3 October 1938 (age 87) Karlsruhe, Nazi Germany

Sport
- Sport: Fencing

Volkmar Würtz (born 3 October 1938) is a German fencer. He represented the United Team of Germany at the 1964 Summer Olympics in the team épée event.
