= Roger Rouge =

Swiss sailor

Personal information
- Nationality: Swiss
- Born: 1 June 1914
- Died: 4 August 1986 (aged 72)

Sport
- Sport: Sailing

Roger Rouge (1 June 1914 – 4 August 1986) was a Swiss sailor. He competed in the 5.5 Metre event at the 1964 Summer Olympics.
