= Jean Graul =

Swiss sailor

Personal information
- Nationality: Swiss
- Born: 19 July 1924
- Died: 1 April 2015 (aged 90)

Sport
- Sport: Sailing

Jean Graul (19 July 1924 – 1 April 2015) was a Swiss sailor. He competed in the 5.5 Metre event at the 1964 Summer Olympics.
