= Esa Lepola =

Finnish swimmer

Personal information
- Born: 25 September 1948 (age 77) Helsinki, Finland
- Height: 182 cm (6 ft 0 in)
- Weight: 65 kg (143 lb)

Sport
- Sport: Swimming
- Club: Helsingin Työväen Uimarit (Helsinki)

Esa Lepola (born 25 September 1948) is a Finnish former swimmer. He competed in the men's 1500 metre freestyle at the 1964 Summer Olympics.
