= Heo Chang-beom =

South Korean weightlifter

Personal information
- Nationality: South Korean
- Born: 17 December 1940 (age 84)

Sport
- Sport: Weightlifting

Heo Chang-beom (born 17 December 1940) is a South Korean weightlifter. He competed in the men's middleweight event at the 1964 Summer Olympics.
