= Swimming at the 1964 Summer Olympics – Men's 1500 metre freestyle =

Men's 1500 metre freestyle at the Games of the XVIII Olympiad
- Venue: Yoyogi National Gymnasium
- Dates: 16 October 1964 (heats); 17 October 1964 (final)
- Competitors: 31 from 21 nations
- Winning time: 17:01.7 OR

Medalists
1st place, gold medalist(s)		Bob Windle	Australia
2nd place, silver medalist(s)		John Nelson	United States
3rd place, bronze medalist(s)		Allan Wood	Australia

The men's 1500 metre freestyle event at the 1964 Olympic Games took place between 16 and 17 October. This swimming event used freestyle swimming, which means that the method of the stroke is not regulated (unlike backstroke, breaststroke, and butterfly events). Nearly all swimmers use the front crawl or a variant of that stroke. Because an Olympic-size swimming pool is 50 metres long, this race consisted of 30 lengths of the pool.

== Results ==
=== Heats ===
Five heats were held; the eight fastest swimmers advanced to the Finals. Those that advanced are highlighted.

==== Heat One ====
Rank	Athlete	Country	Time
1	Bob Windle	Australia	17:15.9
2	József Katona	Hungary	17:33.5
3	Kazuyuki Iwamoto	Japan	17:52.7
4	Holger Kirschke	Germany	18:01.6
5	Celestino Pérez	Puerto Rico	18:07.2
6	Tan Thuan Heng	Malaysia	18:24.2
7	Esa Lepola	Finland	18:33.4

==== Heat Two ====
Rank	Athlete	Country	Time
1	Roy Saari	United States	17:27.0
2	Sueaki Sasaki	Japan	17:28.8
3	Sandy Gilchrist	Canada	17:42.0
4	Tin Maung Ni	Myanmar	18:09.5
5	Alan Durrett	Northern Rhodesia	18:24.9
6	Slobodan Dijaković	Yugoslavia	18:31.2
7	Walter Ledgard Jr.	Peru	19:10.3

==== Heat Three ====
Rank	Athlete	Country	Time
1	John Nelson	United States	17:22.4
2	Russell Phegan	Australia	17:28.9
3	Guillermo Echevarría	Mexico	17:35.0
4	Miguel Torres	Spain	17:36.0
5	Heinz Junga	Germany	18:08.7
6	Petr Lohnický	Czechoslovakia	18:18.4
7	Eliot Chenaux	Puerto Rico	18:33.1

==== Heat Four ====
Rank	Athlete	Country	Time
1	Allan Wood	Australia	17:26.3
2	Veljko Rogošić	Yugoslavia	18:05.5
3	John Thurley	Great Britain	18:12.3
4	Ricardo Morello	Argentina	18:46.5
5	Pano Capéronis	Switzerland	19:10.5
6	Robert Loh	Hong Kong	19:28.6

==== Heat Five ====
Rank	Athlete	Country	Time
1	Bill Farley	United States	17:30.5
2	Satoru Nakano	Japan	17:40.4
3	Julio Arango	Colombia	17:59.1
4	Alfredo Guzmán	Mexico	18:07.4

=== Final ===
Rank	Athlete	Country	Time	Notes
1	Bob Windle	Australia	17:01.7	OR
2	John Nelson	United States	17:03.0	
3	Allan Wood	Australia	17:07.7	
4	Bill Farley	United States	17:18.2	
5	Russell Phegan	Australia	17:22.4	
6	Sueaki Sasaki	Japan	17:25.3	
7	Roy Saari	United States	17:29.2	
8	József Katona	Hungary	17:30.8	

Key: OR = Olympic record
