= Holger Kirschke =

German swimmer (1947–2019)

Personal information
- Born: 15 November 1947 Wetzlar, Germany
- Died: 4 July 2019 (aged 71)
- Height: 177 cm (5 ft 10 in)
- Weight: 82 kg (181 lb)

Sport
- Sport: Swimming
- Club: SV Wetzlar; Wasserfreunde Wuppertal

Holger Kirschke (15 November 1947 – 4 July 2019) was a German swimmer. He competed in the men's 1500 metre freestyle at the 1964 Summer Olympics.
