= Eric Denham =

British sailor

Personal information
- Nationality: British
- Born: 20 September 1929 Cowes, England
- Died: 16 March 2015 (aged 85) Burnaby, British Columbia, Canada

Sport
- Sport: Sailing

Eric Denham (20 September 1929 – 16 March 2015) was a British sailor. He competed in the 5.5 Metre event at the 1964 Summer Olympics.
