= Claude Brodin =

French fencer (1934–2014)

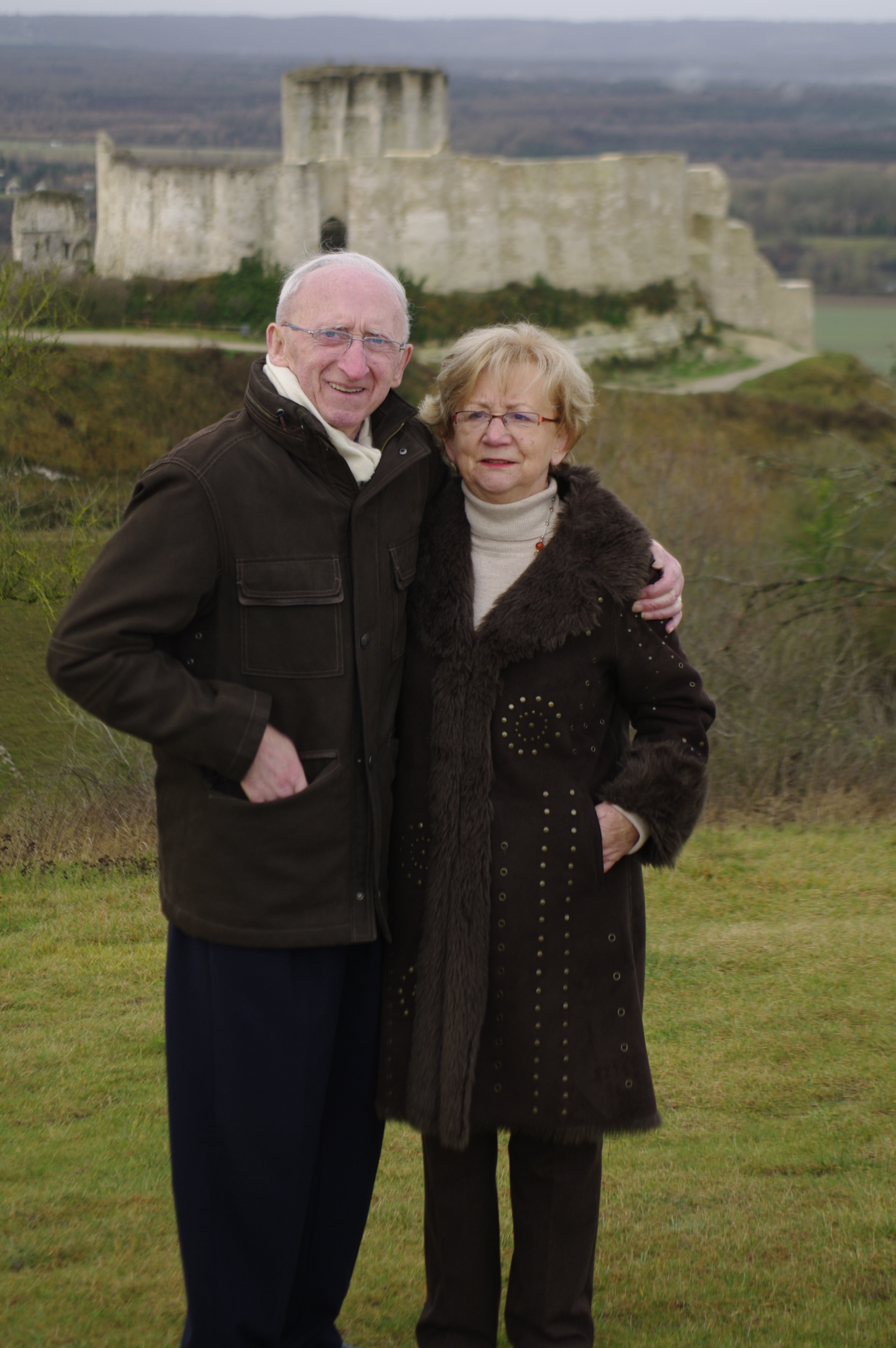

Personal information
- Born: 30 July 1934 Les Andelys, France
- Died: 17 October 2014 (aged 80)

Sport
- Sport: Fencing
Medal record
Men's fencing
Representing France
Olympic Games
Bronze medal – third place	1964 Tokyo	Épée, team

Claude Brodin (30 July 1934 – 17 October 2014) was a French fencer. He won a bronze medal in the team épée event at the 1964 Summer Olympics.
