= Per Holm (sailor) =

Danish sailor

Personal information
- Nationality: Danish
- Born: 2 December 1936 (age 88); Copenhagen, Denmark

Sport
- Sport: Sailing

Per Holm (born 2 December 1936) is a Danish sailor. He competed in the 5.5 Metre event at the 1964 Summer Olympics.
