= Víctor de la Lama =

Mexican sailor (1919–2015)

Personal information
- Born: 11 December 1919; Mexico City, Mexico
- Died: 7 May 2015 (aged 95)

Sport
- Sport: Sailing

Víctor de la Lama (11 December 1919 – 7 May 2015) was a Mexican sailor. He competed in the 5.5 Metre event at the 1964 Summer Olympics.
