= Joseph Haydar =

Australian weightlifter (1938–2024)

Personal information
- Nationality: Australian
- Born: 18 November 1938 Lebanon
- Died: 8 October 2024 (aged 85)

Sport
- Sport: Weightlifting

Joseph Haydar (18 November 1938 – 8 October 2024) was an Australian weightlifter. He competed in the men's middleweight event at the 1964 Summer Olympics.

== Biography ==
Haydar was born in Lebanon on 18 November 1938. After his weightlifting career he settled in Bunbury, Western Australia, where he established a pizzeria, Joe's Pizza. In 1979 he opened one of Bunbury's first high-rise buildings, Haydar House.

Haydar died on 8 October 2024, at the age of 85.
