= Tamás Gábor =

Hungarian fencer (1932–2007)

Personal information
- Born: 24 April 1932 Budapest, Hungary
- Died: 6 May 2007 (aged 75) Budapest, Hungary

Sport
- Sport: Fencing
Medal record
Men's fencing
Representing Hungary
Men's Fencing
Gold medal – first place	1964 Tokyo	Team epée

Tamás Gábor (24 April 1932 – 6 May 2007 in Budapest) was a Hungarian Olympic champion épée fencer.

Gábor was born in Budapest, Hungary, and was Jewish.

== Fencing career ==
=== National championships ===
He was a five-time Hungarian champion.

=== World championships ===
In World Championships competition, Gábor's individual medals were a bronze medal in 1961 and a silver medal in 1962. In Team competitions he won three medals: silver in 1957 and 1958, and gold in 1959.

=== Olympic career ===
In 1960 Gábor came in 17th in individual épée and 4th in Team épée at the Olympics in Rome. He won a gold medal in Team Epee with his Hungarian team at the 1964 Summer Olympics in Tokyo.

=== Hall of Fame ===
Gábor was inducted into the International Jewish Sports Hall of Fame in 1996.

== Outside fencing ==
Outside fencing, Gábor worked in the hotel business.

== See also ==
- List of select Jewish fencers
- List of Jewish Olympic medalists
