= Jean Gontier =

Swiss fencer

Personal information
- Born: 26 January 1942 (age 84)

Sport
- Sport: Fencing

Jean Gontier (born 26 January 1942) is a Swiss fencer. He competed in the team épée event at the 1964 Summer Olympics.
