= Árpád Bárány =

Hungarian fencer (born 1931)

Personal information
- Born: 24 June 1931 (age 95) Budapest, Hungary

Sport
- Sport: Fencing
Medal record
Men's fencing
Representing Hungary
Olympic Games
| Gold medal – first place | 1964 Tokyo | Épée, team |

Árpád Bárány (born 24 June 1931) is a Hungarian fencer. He won a gold medal in the team épée event at the 1964 Summer Olympics.
