= Hiromi Yamafuji =

Japanese cyclist

Personal information
- Born: 23 October 1944 Akita, Japan
- Died: 9 May 1984 (aged 39) Toride, Japan
- Height: 164 cm (5 ft 5 in)
- Weight: 62 kg (137 lb)

Cycling career
- Sport: Cycling

Hiromi Yamafuji (山藤 浩三, Yamafuji Hiromi; 23 October 1944 – 9 May 1984) was a Japanese cyclist. He competed in the individual pursuit and team pursuit events at the 1964 Summer Olympics. In 1984, Yamafuji, along with his wife and children, committed suicide in their home in Toride. Their suicides are believed to have been due to financial difficulties.
