= Katsutada Minatoi =

Japanese fencer

Personal information
- Born: 1 August 1939 (age 86)

Sport
- Sport: Fencing

Katsutada Minatoi (港井 克忠, Minatoi Katsutada; born 1 August 1939) is a Japanese fencer. He competed in the team épée event at the 1964 Summer Olympics.
