= Masao Yoshida (sailor) =

Japanese sailor (born 1932)

Personal information
- Nationality: Japanese
- Born: 10 November 1932 (age 93)

Sport
- Sport: Sailing

Masao Yoshida (born 30 November 1932) is a Japanese sailor. He competed in the 5.5 Metre event at the 1964 Summer Olympics.
