= Eirik Johannessen =

Norwegian sailor

Eirik Johannessen (born 30 July 1933) is a Norwegian former sailor who competed in the 1964 Summer Olympics, in the 1968 Summer Olympics, and in the 1972 Summer Olympics. He was born in Oslo.
