= Joseph Batchelder =

American sailor

Joe Batchelder
Personal information
- Full name: Joseph Laws Batchelder
- Born: August 24, 1938 (age 87) Brookline, Massachusetts, U.S.
Medal record
Men's sailing
Representing United States
Olympic Games
Bronze medal – third place	1964 Tokyo	5.5 metre class

Joseph Laws "Joe" Batchelder (born August 24, 1938) (died September 25, 2024) was an American sailor who competed in the 1964 Summer Olympics.

In 1964 he won the bronze medal as crew member of the American boat Bingo in the 5.5 metre class event.

He was born in Brookline, Massachusetts, and lived in Marblehead, Massachusetts, for 50 years.
