= Kazuyuki Iwamoto =

Japanese swimmer (born 1946)

Personal information
- Born: 15 November 1946 (age 79)
- Height: 166 cm (5 ft 5 in)
- Weight: 55 kg (121 lb)

Sport
- Sport: Swimming
Medal record
Representing Japan
Summer Universiade
Bronze medal – third place	1965 Budapest	4x200m freestyle relay

Kazuyuki Iwamoto (岩本 和幸, Iwamoto Kazuyuki; born 15 November 1946) is a Japanese former swimmer. He competed in the men's 1500 metre freestyle at the 1964 Summer Olympics.
