= Francis Scully (sailor) =

American sailor

Medal record

Sailing

Representing the United States

Olympic Games
Bronze medal – third place	1964 Tokyo	5.5 metre class

Francis Paul "Frank" Scully Jr. (January 24, 1925 – November 9, 1998) was an American sailor who competed in the 1964 Summer Olympics.

He was born in Boston, Massachusetts and graduated from Harvard University in 1951.

In 1964 he won the bronze medal as crew member of the American boat Bingo in the 5.5 metre class event.
