= Fujiya Matsumoto =

Japanese sailor (1932–2022)

Personal information
- Nationality: Japanese
- Born: 25 March 1932; Numazu, Shizuoka, Japan
- Died: 12 March 2022 (aged 89)

Sport
- Sport: Sailing

Fujiya Matsumoto (25 March 1932 – 12 March 2022) was a Japanese sailor. He competed in the 5.5 Metre event at the 1964 Summer Olympics.
