= Sueaki Sasaki =

Japanese swimmer

Personal information
- Born: 16 November 1942 (age 83)
- Height: 174 cm (5 ft 9 in)
- Weight: 68 kg (150 lb)

Sport
- Sport: Swimming

Sueaki Sasaki (佐々木 末昭, Sasaki Sueaki; born 16 November 1942) is a Japanese former swimmer. He competed in the men's 1500 metre freestyle at the 1964 Summer Olympics.
