= Takeshi Hagiwara =

Japanese sailor

Personal information
- Nationality: Japanese
- Born: 9 January 1937 (age 89)

Sport
- Sport: Sailing

Takeshi Hagiwara (born 9 January 1937) is a Japanese sailor. He competed in the 5.5 Metre event at the 1964 Summer Olympics.
