= Hirofumi Daimatsu =

Japanese volleyball coach

大松博文(Daimatsu Hirofumi)

Personal information
- Nationality: Japan
- Born: 12 February 1921; Ayauta Gun, Kagawa Prefecture, Japan
- Died: 24 November 1978 (aged 57); Tokyo
- Education: Kwansei Gakuin University

National team
Japan women's national volleyball team
Honours
Olympic Games
Coach for women's volleyball
Representing Japan
Gold medal – first place	1964 Tokyo
World Championship
Coach for women's volleyball
Representing Japan
Gold medal – first place	1962 Soviet Union
Silver medal – second place	1960 Brasil

Hirofumi Daimatsu (大松 博文, Daimatsu Hirofumi; 12 February 1921 – 24 November 1978) was a Japanese volleyball coach and a Japanese politician. He led Oriental Witches, nickname of "Nichibo Kaizuka", a factory volleyball team of Dai Nippon Spinning Co., Ltd. (later, Nichibo, thereafter, Unitika) in Kaizuka, Osaka given by the reports of European media when they achieved 24 consecutive victories against other national teams on the expedition to Europe, to world champion.

== Biography ==
Hirofumi Daimatsu was born in Ayauta Gun, Kagawa Prefecture, Japan.

In 1941, he joined Dai Nippon Spinning Co., Ltd. (later, Nichibo, thereafter, Unitika) after he graduated from Kwansei Gakuin University.

Three months later, he was called up for military service and thrown into operation of Imphal named "Bleached bones road" after moving around China. Second lieutenant Daimatsu's unit of 40 men was routed and had to cross mountains, having fevers of 40 because of malaria and/or amebic dysentery without food.

After World War II, in 1953 he became the coach for the factory women's volleyball team of Nichibo Kaizuka, namely Oriental Witches which started from a factory volleyball team located in Kaizuka City and evolved into the Japanese National Team. Oriental Witches achieved 175 consecutive wins by Daimatsu's severe training, so he was called "Demon Daimatsu". As the coach of Japanese National Team, he led the Japanese Women's Team to a silver medal in the World Championship in 1960, a gold medal in the World Championship again in 1962 and a gold medal in Tokyo Olympics in 1964.

In 1968, Daimatsu ran from Liberal Democratic Party and was elected as a member of the House of Councilors of the Diet.

In November 24, 1978, Hirofumi Daimatsu died.

In 2000, Hirofumi Daimatsu was inducted into the International Volleyball Hall of Fame.

== Publications ==
- 『おれについてこい!』（Kodansha 1963）
- 『なせば成る』（Kodansha 1964）

== See also ==
- FIVB Volleyball Women's World Championship
- Japan women's national volleyball team
- Volleyball at the 1964 Summer Olympics
- Volleyball Hall of Fame
- Kurowashiki All Japan Volleyball Tournament
