= Sadahiro Miwa =

Japanese weightlifter (1941–2003)

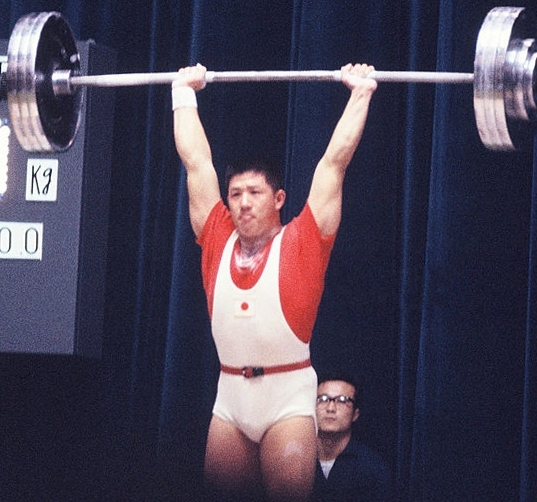
- Sadahiro Miwa at the 1964 Olympics

Personal information
- Born: May 16, 1941
- Died: 2003
- Height: 1.66 m (5 ft 5 in)

Sport
- Sport: Weightlifting
Medal record
Representing Japan
World Championships
Silver medal – second place	1963 Stockholm	-56 kg

Sadahiro Miwa (三輪 定広, Miwa Sadahiro; May 16, 1941 – 2003) is a retired Japanese weightlifter. He competed at the 1964 and 1968 Olympics in the middleweight class (-78 kg) and finished in fifth and tenth place, respectively.
