= Takeshi Teshima =

Japanese fencer

Personal information
- Born: 5 September 1941 (age 84)

Sport
- Sport: Fencing

Takeshi Teshima (手島 猛, Teshima Takeshi; born 5 September 1941) is a Japanese fencer. He competed in the team épée event at the 1964 Summer Olympics.
