= Masako Kondo =

Japanese volleyball player (born 1941)

Personal information
- Nationality: Japanese
- Born: 27 March 1941 (age 85) Fukuoka, Japan

Sport
- Sport: Volleyball
Medal record
Representing Japan
Women's volleyball
Olympic Games
Gold medal – first place	1964 Tokyo	Team

Masako Kondo (近藤 雅子, Kondō Masako; born 27 March 1941) is a Japanese volleyball player and Olympic champion. She was a member of the Japanese winning team, Oriental Witches, at the 1964 Summer Olympics in Tokyo.
