= Setsuko Sasaki =

Japanese volleyball player (born 1944)

Medal record

Representing Japan

Women's volleyball

Olympic Games
Gold medal – first place	1964 Tokyo	Team

Setsuko Sasaki (佐々木 節子, Sasaki Setsuko; born October 16, 1944) is a Japanese volleyball player and Olympic champion.

She was a member of the Japanese winning team, Oriental Witches, at the 1964 Summer Olympics in Tokyo.
