= Yoko Shinozaki =

Japanese volleyball player (born 1945)

Medal record

Representing Japan

Women's volleyball

Olympic Games
Gold medal – first place	1964 Tokyo	Team

Women's World Championship
Gold medal – first place	1967 Japan	Team
Gold medal – first place	1962 Soviet Union	Team

Yoko Shinozaki (篠崎 洋子, Shinozaki Yōko; born January 29, 1945) is a Japanese volleyball player and Olympic champion.

She was a major player to help Japanese women's national volleyball, team to dominate the World in 1962-67 by winning 1962 FIVB Women's World Championship, 1964 Tokyo Olympic Games and 1967 FIVB Women's World Championship in row.
