= Yuko Fujimoto =

Japanese volleyball player (born 1943)

Medal record

Representing Japan

Women's volleyball

Olympic Games
Gold medal – first place	1964 Tokyo	Team

Yuko Fujimoto (藤本 佑子, Fujimoto Yūko; born January 14, 1943) is a Japanese volleyball player and Olympic champion.

She was a member of the Japanese winning team, Oriental Witches, at the 1964 Summer Olympics in Tokyo.
