= Katsumi Matsumura =

Japanese volleyball player (born 1944)

Medal record

Representing Japan

Women's volleyball

Olympic Games
Gold medal – first place	1964 Tokyo	Team
Silver medal – second place	1972 Munich	Team

World Championship
Gold medal – first place	1962 Soviet Union	Team
Gold medal – first place	1967 Japan	Team
Silver medal – second place	1970 Bulgaria	Team

Katsumi Matsumura (松村 勝美, Matsumura Katsumi; born 8 March 1944) is a Japanese former volleyball player and Olympic champion.

She was a major player to help Japanese women's national volleyball team to dominate the World in 1962-67 by winning 1962 FIVB Women's World Championship, 1964 Tokyo Olympic Games and 1967 FIVB Women's World Championship in row. She also competed at the 1972 Summer Olympics.
