= Sata Isobe =

Japanese volleyball player (1944–2016)

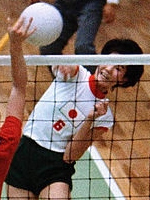
- Isobe at the 1964 Olympics

Personal information
- Born: 19 December 1944 Chiba, Japan
- Died: 18 December 2016 (aged 71) Osaka, Japan
- Height: 1.73 m (5 ft 8 in)
- Weight: 60 kg (130 lb)

Sport
- Sport: Volleyball
- Club: Nichibo Kaizuka
Medal record
Representing Japan
Olympic Games
Gold medal – first place	1964 Tokyo	Team
World Championships
Gold medal – first place	1962 Soviet Union	Team

Sata Isobe (磯辺 サタ, Isobe Sata; 19 December 1944 – 18 December 2016) was a Japanese volleyball player. She was a member of the Japanese winning teams, Oriental Witches, at the 1962 World Championships and 1964 Summer Olympics.

She died in 2016 at the age of 72. It is reported by The Sankei News that she lost her parents because of World War II but never lost her patience, warm personality and strength.
