= Yuriko Handa =

Japanese volleyball player (born 1940)

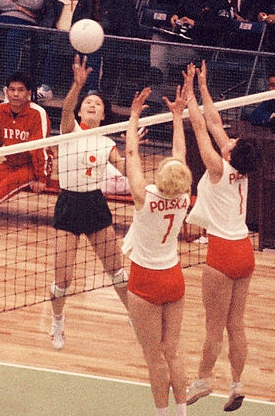
- Yuriko Handa at the 1964 Olympics

Personal information
- Born: March 31, 1940 (age 86) Tochigi, Tochigi, Japan
- Height: 1.66 m (5 ft 5 in)
- Weight: 60 kg (130 lb)

Sport
- Sport: Volleyball
- Club: Nichibo Kaizuka
Medal record
Representing Japan
Olympic Games
Gold medal – first place	1964 Tokyo	Team
World Championship
Gold medal – first place	1962 Soviet Union	Team

Yuriko Handa (半田 百合子, Handa Yuriko; born 31 March 1940) is a retired Japanese volleyball player. She was a member of the Japanese winning teams, Oriental Witches, at the 1962 World Championships and 1964 Summer Olympics.
