= Emiko Miyamoto =

Japanese volleyball player (1937–2023)

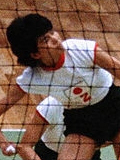
- Miyamoto at the 1964 Olympics

Personal information
- Born: May 10, 1937 Wakayama, Wakayama, Japan
- Died: December 7, 2023 (aged 86) Takahagi, Japan
- Height: 1.72 m (5 ft 8 in)
- Weight: 56 kg (123 lb)

Sport
- Sport: Volleyball
- Club: Nichibo Kaizuka
Medal record
Representing Japan
Olympic Games
Gold medal – first place	1964 Tokyo	Team
World Championship
Silver medal – second place	1960 Brazil	Team
Gold medal – first place	1962 Soviet Union	Team

Emiko Miyamoto (宮本 恵美子, Miyamoto Emiko; May 10, 1937 – December 7, 2023) was a Japanese volleyball player. She was a member of the Japanese winning teams, Oriental Witches, at the 1962 World Championships and 1964 Summer Olympics. Miyamoto died from sepsis in Takahagi, on December 7, 2023, at the age of 86.
