= 1962 FIVB Women's Volleyball World Championship =

1962 FIVB Women's World Championship
Tournament details
- Host country: Soviet Union
- Dates: 13–25 October
- Teams: 14
- Venue: (in 4 host cities)

Final positions
- Champions: Japan (1st title)

The 1962 FIVB Women's World Championship was the fourth edition of the tournament, organised by the world's governing body, the FIVB. It was held from 13 to 25 October 1962 in the Soviet Union.

As a tournament held once every four years and following its last edition in 1960, the subsequent tournament should have been in 1964. When volleyball became an Olympic sport starting in the 1964 Games, the FIVB decided to move the World Championships from the Olympic years to be played in between Olympic Games, therefore anticipating the 1964 edition to 1962.

== Teams ==
- Austria
- Brazil
- Bulgaria
- China
- Czechoslovakia
- East Germany
- Hungary
- Japan
- Netherlands
- North Korea
- Poland
- Romania
- Soviet Union
- West Germany

== Squads ==
Source:

== Venues ==
Pool A	Pool B	Host cities in the Soviet Union
Riga	Leningrad	Host cities in the Soviet Union
Capacity:	Capacity:	Host cities in the Soviet Union
Pool C, Final round	Pool D, Final round	Host cities in the Soviet Union
Kiev	Moscow	Host cities in the Soviet Union
Capacity:	Capacity:	Host cities in the Soviet Union

== Format ==
The tournament was played in two different stages (first and final rounds). In the First round, the 14 participants were divided in four groups (two groups of four teams and two groups of three teams). A single round-robin format was played within each group to determine the teams group position, all teams progressed to the next round.

In the Final round, two groups were created (1st-8th and 9th-14th), teams were allocated to a group according to their First round group position (best two teams of each group going to 1st-8th and the remaining teams to 9th-14th). A single round-robin format was played within each group with matches already played between teams in the First round also counted in this round.

== Pools composition ==
Pool A	Pool B	Pool C	Pool D
Austria	Bulgaria	China	Netherlands
Brazil	Czechoslovakia	East Germany	Romania
Poland	Hungary	Japan	Soviet Union
		North Korea	West Germany

== Results ==
=== First round ===
==== Pool A ====
Location: Riga

Pos	Team	Pld	W	L	Pts	SW	SL	SR	SPW	SPL	SPR	Qualification
1	Poland	2	2	0	4	6	0	MAX	90	22	4.091	Final places
2	Brazil	2	1	1	3	3	3	1.000	60	53	1.132	Final places
3	Austria	2	0	2	2	0	6	0.000	15	90	0.167	9th–14th places

Date		Score		Set 1	Set 2	Set 3	Set 4	Set 5	Total
13 Oct	Poland	3–0	Brazil	15–4	15–5	15–6			45–15
14 Oct	Brazil	3–0	Austria	15–1	15–2	15–5			45–8
15 Oct	Poland	3–0	Austria	15–2	15–3	15–2			45–7

==== Pool B ====
Location: Leningrad

Pos	Team	Pld	W	L	Pts	SW	SL	SR	SPW	SPL	SPR	Qualification
1	Bulgaria	2	2	0	4	6	2	3.000	111	87	1.276	Final places
2	Czechoslovakia	2	1	1	3	4	4	1.000	105	96	1.094	Final places
3	Hungary	2	0	2	2	2	6	0.333	84	117	0.718	9th–14th places

Date		Score		Set 1	Set 2	Set 3	Set 4	Set 5	Total
13 Oct	Bulgaria	3–1	Czechoslovakia	15–12	15–12	8–15	15–7		53–46
14 Oct	Czechoslovakia	3–1	Hungary	12–15	17–15	15–8	15–5		59–43
15 Oct	Bulgaria	3–1	Hungary	13–15	15–10	15–4	15–12		58–41

==== Pool C ====
Location: Kiev

Pos	Team	Pld	W	L	Pts	SW	SL	SR	SPW	SPL	SPR	Qualification
1	Japan	3	3	0	6	9	0	MAX	135	61	2.213	Final places
2	East Germany	3	2	1	5	6	5	1.200	130	136	0.956	Final places
3	China	3	1	2	4	5	7	0.714	137	162	0.846	9th–14th places
4	North Korea	3	0	3	3	1	9	0.111	103	146	0.705	9th–14th places

Date		Score		Set 1	Set 2	Set 3	Set 4	Set 5	Total
13 Oct	China	3–1	North Korea	8–15	15–13	18–16	15–6		56–50
13 Oct	Japan	3–0	East Germany	15–7	15–10	15–1			45–18
14 Oct	East Germany	3–2	China	13–15	15–6	9–15	15–9	15–12	67–57
14 Oct	Japan	3–0	North Korea	15–2	15–6	15–11			45–19
15 Oct	Japan	3–0	China	15–5	15–12	15–7			45–24
15 Oct	East Germany	3–0	North Korea	15–13	15–9	15–12			45–34

==== Pool D ====
Location: Moscow

Pos	Team	Pld	W	L	Pts	SW	SL	SR	SPW	SPL	SPR	Qualification
1	Soviet Union	3	3	0	6	9	0	MAX	135	39	3.462	Final places
2	Romania	3	2	1	5	6	3	2.000	110	87	1.264	Final places
3	Netherlands	3	1	2	4	3	6	0.500	82	106	0.774	9th–14th places
4	West Germany	3	0	3	3	0	9	0.000	40	135	0.296	9th–14th places

Date		Score		Set 1	Set 2	Set 3	Set 4	Set 5	Total
13 Oct	Romania	3–0	West Germany	15–5	15–2	15–10			45–17
13 Oct	Soviet Union	3–0	Netherlands	15–4	15–6	15–2			45–12
14 Oct	Romania	3–0	Netherlands	15–4	15–9	15–12			45–25
14 Oct	Soviet Union	3–0	West Germany	15–3	15–1	15–3			45–7
15 Oct	Netherlands	3–0	West Germany	15–6	15–8	15–2			45–16
15 Oct	Soviet Union	3–0	Romania	15–6	15–7	15–7			45–20

=== Final round ===
The results and the points of the matches between the same teams that were already played during the first round are taken into account for the final round.

==== 9th–14th places ====
Location: Kiev

Pos	Team	Pld	W	L	Pts	SW	SL	SR	SPW	SPL	SPR
9	China	5	5	0	10	15	2	7.500	247	116	2.129
10	North Korea	5	4	1	9	13	4	3.250	242	157	1.541
11	Hungary	5	3	2	8	10	7	1.429	219	179	1.223
12	Netherlands	5	2	3	7	8	9	0.889	191	181	1.055
13	West Germany	5	1	4	6	3	12	0.250	113	210	0.538
14	Austria	5	0	5	5	0	15	0.000	59	228	0.259

Date		Score		Set 1	Set 2	Set 3	Set 4	Set 5	Total
18 Oct	China	3–0	Austria	15–4	15–4	15–0			45–8
18 Oct	North Korea	3–1	Netherlands	12–15	15–10	15–8	15–7		57–40
18 Oct	Hungary	3–0	West Germany	15–1	15–12	15–6			45–19
20 Oct	North Korea	3–0	West Germany	15–6	15–8	15–9			45–23
20 Oct	Netherlands	3–0	Austria	15–0	15–0	15–4			45–4
20 Oct	China	3–1	Hungary	15–2	11–15	15–13	15–5		56–35
21 Oct	West Germany	3–0	Austria	15–10	15–4	18–16			48–30
21 Oct	China	3–0	Netherlands	15–5	15–3	15–8			45–16
21 Oct	North Korea	3–0	Hungary	15–12	15–10	15–13			45–35
23 Oct	North Korea	3–0	Austria	15–2	15–1	15–0			45–3
23 Oct	Hungary	3–1	Netherlands	15–10	18–16	11–15	15–4		59–45
23 Oct	China	3–0	West Germany	15–2	15–2	15–3			45–7
24 Oct	Hungary	3–0	Austria	15–4	15–7	15–3			45–14

==== Final places ====
Location: Moscow

Pos	Team	Pld	W	L	Pts	SW	SL	SR	SPW	SPL	SPR
1	Japan	7	7	0	14	21	1	21.000	329	103	3.194
2	Soviet Union	7	6	1	13	19	4	4.750	322	182	1.769
3	Poland	7	4	3	11	13	11	1.182	300	283	1.060
4	Romania	7	3	4	10	12	13	0.923	287	329	0.872
5	Czechoslovakia	7	3	4	10	12	14	0.857	304	321	0.947
6	Bulgaria	7	3	4	10	12	15	0.800	306	360	0.850
7	East Germany	7	2	5	9	7	17	0.412	260	332	0.783
8	Brazil	7	0	7	7	0	21	0.000	118	316	0.373

Date		Score		Set 1	Set 2	Set 3	Set 4	Set 5	Total
18 Oct	Japan	3–0	Poland	15–3	15–5	15–2			45–15
18 Oct	Romania	3–0	Brazil	15–6	15–4	16–14			46–24
18 Oct	East Germany	3–2	Bulgaria	15–17	15–10	9–15	15–13	17–15	71–70
18 Oct	Soviet Union	3–0	Czechoslovakia	15–5	16–14	15–10			46–29
19 Oct	Romania	3–1	Poland	16–14	9–15	15–10	16–14		56–53
19 Oct	Soviet Union	3–0	East Germany	15–1	15–5	15–8			45–14
19 Oct	Czechoslovakia	3–0	Brazil	15–5	15–7	15–8			45–20
19 Oct	Japan	3–0	Bulgaria	15–3	15–2	15–8			45–13
20 Oct	Czechoslovakia	3–1	Romania	13–15	16–14	15–10	15–12		59–51
20 Oct	Poland	3–0	Bulgaria	15–3	15–7	15–13			45–23
20 Oct	East Germany	3–0	Brazil	15–4	15–6	15–8			45–18
20 Oct	Japan	3–1	Soviet Union	14–16	15–7	15–11	15–3		59–37
22 Oct	Japan	3–0	Brazil	15–4	15–2	15–4			45–10
22 Oct	Romania	3–0	East Germany	15–10	15–4	16–14			46–28
22 Oct	Poland	3–2	Czechoslovakia	12–15	5–15	15–12	15–9	15–8	62–59
22 Oct	Soviet Union	3–1	Bulgaria	15–5	14–16	15–5	15–1		59–27
23 Oct	Czechoslovakia	3–1	East Germany	13–15	16–14	15–5	15–10		59–44
23 Oct	Japan	3–0	Romania	15–2	15–0	15–1			45–3
23 Oct	Soviet Union	3–0	Poland	15–11	15–12	15–8			45–31
23 Oct	Bulgaria	3–0	Brazil	15–7	15–9	15–13			45–29
25 Oct	Poland	3–0	East Germany	15–13	19–17	15–10			49–40
25 Oct	Bulgaria	3–2	Romania	16–18	15–8	14–16	15–13	15–10	75–65
25 Oct	Japan	3–0	Czechoslovakia	15–2	15–4	15–1			45–7
25 Oct	Soviet Union	3–0	Brazil	15–0	15–0	15–2			45–2

== Final standing ==
Rank	Team
1st place, gold medalist(s)	Japan
2nd place, silver medalist(s)	Soviet Union
3rd place, bronze medalist(s)	Poland
4	Romania
5	Czechoslovakia
6	Bulgaria
7	East Germany
8	Brazil
9	China
10	North Korea
11	Hungary
12	Netherlands
13	West Germany
14	Austria

1962 Women's World champions

Japan
1st title

Team roster
Yoko Aoki, Noriko Honda, Yuriko Handa, Sada Isobe, Masae Kasai, Mitsue Masuo, Katsumi Matsumura, Yoshiko Matsumura, Emiko Miyamoto, Yoko Shinozaki, Kuniko Tanida, Teruko Yamada
Head coach
Hirofumi Daymatsu
