= Masae Kasai =

Japanese volleyball player

Personal information
- Full name: Masae Kasai Nakamura
- Born: 14 July 1933; Minami-Alps, Yamanashi, Japan
- Died: 3 October 2013 (aged 80); Tokyo, Japan

Volleyball information
- Number: 1
Honours
Women's volleyball
Representing Japan
Olympic Games
Gold medal – first place	1964 Tokyo	Team
World Championship
Gold medal – first place	1963 Soviet Union
Silver medal – second place	1960 Brazil

Masae Kasai (河西 昌枝 Kasai Masae, 14 July 1933 – 3 October 2013) was a volleyball player from Japan, who was a member of the Japan Women's National Team, Oriental Witches, that won the gold medal at the 1964 Summer Olympics.

Masae Kasai was born in Minami-Alps, Yamanashi, and started playing volleyball when the sport was still played with nine players a side in Japan (six are used internationally). She joined the Nichibo fiber spinning company right out of high school, first playing for corporation's Ashikaga (Tochigi) team, later for the one from Kaizuka (Osaka). The latter team dominated the women's sport in the late 1950s and 1960s, and when the Japanese started playing according to international rules, Nichibo Kaizuka's players formed the national team.

Kasai and her teammates débuted at the 1960 FIVB World Championship in Brazil, finishing behind the Soviet Union. Two years later, the Japanese won the World Championship title, defeating the Soviet squad before a Moscow audience. When volleyball made its Olympic début in Tokyo, they lived up to high expectations by again beating the Soviet Union in the final round-robin match, in straight sets.

After the Olympics, team captain Kasai met with the Japanese prime minister and complained to him that she had not been able to find a husband because of the difficult training regimen. The Prime Minister set her up with a date and the two later married. She later went on to become a volleyball coach in Japan and China, and sat on the board of the Japanese Volleyball Association.

In 2008, Kasai was inducted into the International Volleyball Hall of Fame.

== Personal life and death ==
Masae Kasai (who changed her last name to Nakamura after she married) died on 3 October 2013, in Tokyo from intracranial hemorrhage.
