= Yoshiko Matsumura =

Japanese volleyball player (born 1941)

Medal record

Representing Japan

Women's volleyball

Olympic Games
Gold medal – first place	1964 Tokyo	Team

Yoshiko Matsumura (松村 好子, Matsumura Yoshiko; born 9 December 1941) is a Japanese volleyball player and Olympic champion.

She was a member of the Japanese winning team, Oriental Witches, at the 1964 Summer Olympics in Tokyo.
