= Kinuko Tanida =

Japanese volleyball player (1939–2020)

Medal record

Representing Japan

Women's volleyball

Olympic Games
Gold medal – first place	1964 Tokyo	Team

Kinuko Tanida (谷田 絹子, Tanida Kinuko; 18 September 1939 – 4 December 2020) was a Japanese volleyball player and Olympic champion.

She was a member of the Japanese winning team, Oriental Witches, at the 1964 Summer Olympics in Tokyo.
