= List of flag bearers for Cambodia at the Olympics =

Cambodia at the Olympics
- Flag of Cambodia
- IOC code: CAM
- NOC: National Olympic Committee of Cambodia
- Website: www.noccambodia.org (in Khmer and English)
- Medals: Gold 0 Silver 0 Bronze 0 Total 0

Summer appearances
- 1956; 1960; 1964; 1968; 1972; 1976–1992; 1996; 2000; 2004; 2008; 2012; 2016; 2020; 2024

This is a list of flag bearers who have represented Cambodia at the Olympics.

Flag bearers carry the national flag of their country at the opening ceremony of the Olympic Games.

#	Event year	Season	Flag bearer	Sport
1	1972	Summer	Chaing Cheng	Official
2	1996	Summer	To Rithya	Athletics
3	2000	Summer	To Rithya	Athletics
4	2004	Summer	Hem Kiry	Swimming
5	2008	Summer	Hem Bunting	Athletics
6	2012	Summer	Sorn Davin	Taekwondo
7	2016	Summer	Sorn Seavmey	Taekwondo
8	2020	Summer	Bunpichmorakat Kheun	Swimming
8	2020	Summer	Pen Sokong	Athletics
9	2024	Summer	Chhun Bunthorn	Athletics
9	2024	Summer	Apsara Sakbun	Swimming

== See also ==
- Cambodia at the Olympics
