= List of Cambodia records in swimming =

The Cambodia records in swimming are the fastest ever performances of swimmers from Cambodia, which are recognised and ratified by the Khmer Swimming Federation.

All records were set in finals unless noted otherwise.

== Long Course (50 m) ==
=== Men ===
| Event | Time | | Name | Club | Date | Meet | Location | Ref |
|---|---|---|---|---|---|---|---|---|
| 50 m freestyle | 24.08 | | Antoine De Lapparent | - | | - | | |
| 100 m freestyle | 52.86 | h | Antoine De Lapparent | Cambodia | 6 May 2023 | Southeast Asian Games | Phnom Penh, Cambodia | |
| 200 m freestyle | 1:58.41 | h | Sovijja Pou | Cambodia | 3 August 2015 | World Championships | Kazan, Russia | |
| 400 m freestyle | 4:21.57 | h | Sovijja Pou | Cambodia | 11 June 2015 | Southeast Asian Games | Singapore, Singapore | |
| 800 m freestyle | 10:17.95 | † | Chamraen Youri Maximov | Cambodia | 13 December 2009 | Southeast Asian Games | Vientiane, Laos | |
| 1500 m freestyle | 17:51.27 | | Charles Rachana | Cambodia | 8 May 2023 | Southeast Asian Games | Phnom Penh, Cambodia | |
| 50 m backstroke | 26.94 | h | De Lappatent Antonie | Cambodia | 7 May 2023 | Southeast Asian Games | Phnom Penh, Cambodia | |
| 50 m backstroke | 26.77 | h | Antoine De Lapparent | Cambodia | 25 September 2023 | Asian Games | Hangzhou, China | |
| 100 m backstroke | 58.93 | r | Antoine De Lapparent | Cambodia | 8 May 2023 | Southeast Asian Games | Phnom Penh, Cambodia | |
| 200 m backstroke | 2:12.42 | h | Antoine De Lapparent | SN Metz | 9 April 2023 | French Junior Championships | Chartres, France | |
| 50 m breaststroke | 29.81 | h | Esarak Sok | Cambodia | 25 September 2026 | Asian Games | Tokyo, Japan | |
| 100 m breaststroke | 1:08.71 | h | Lyheang Oung | Cambodia | 7 May 2023 | Southeast Asian Games | Phnom Penh, Cambodia | |
| 100 m breaststroke | 1:07.66 | '#' | Veareaksak Limsok | Cambodia | 7 November 2024 | 4th National Game | Phnom Penh, Cambodia | |
| 200m breaststroke | 2:24.28 | h | Pieter Sok Kha Vanoosten | Cambodia | 24 September 2026 | Asian Games | Tokyo, Japan | |
| 50m butterfly | 25.82 | h | Antoine De Lapparent | Cambodia | 24 September 2026 | Asian Games | Tokyo, Japan | |
| 100m butterfly | 58.46 | h | Sovijja Pou | Cambodia | 9 June 2015 | Southeast Asian Games | Singapore, Singapore | |
| 200m butterfly | 2:11.63 | h | Sovijja Pou | Cambodia | 8 June 2015 | Southeast Asian Games | Singapore, Singapore | |
| 200m individual medley | 2:14.71 | h | Pieter Sok Kha Vanoosten | Cambodia | 20 September 2026 | Asian Games | Tokyo, Japan | |
| 400m individual medley | 4:52.81 | h | Pieter Sok Kha Vanoosten | Cambodia | 22 September 2026 | Asian Games | Tokyo, Japan | |
| 4×100m freestyle relay | 3:40.32 | | Antoine De Lapparent (53.57); Montross Phansovannarun (55.74); Bean Sokhuy (56.99); Hem Puch (54.02) | Cambodia | 10 May 2023 | Southeast Asian Games | Phnom Penh, Cambodia | |
| 4×200m freestyle relay | 8:23.64 | | Charles Bennici (2:06.16); Montross Phansovannarun (2:12.64); Hem Puch (2:04.41); De Lappatent Antonie (2:00.43) | Cambodia | 7 May 2023 | Southeast Asian Games | Phnom Penh, Cambodia | |
| 4×100m medley relay | 3:59.88 | | Antoine De Lapparent (58.93); Oung Lyheng (1:08.27); Bean Sokhuy (58.83); Hem Puch (53.85) | Cambodia | 8 May 2023 | Southeast Asian Games | Phnom Penh, Cambodia | |

Legend: # – Record awaiting ratification by Khmer Swimming Federation; WR – World record; AS – Asian record;
Records not set in finals: h – heat; sf – semifinal; r – relay 1st leg; rh – relay heat 1st leg; b – B final; † – en route to final mark; so – swim-off; tt – time trial

=== Women ===
| Event | Time | | Name | Club | Date | Meet | Location | Ref |
|---|---|---|---|---|---|---|---|---|
| 50 m freestyle | 26.41 | h | Katarina Sakbun | Cambodia | 10 May 2023 | Southeast Asian Games | Phnom Penh, Cambodia | |
| 100 m freestyle | 58.23 | | Katarina Sakbun | Cambodia | 8 May 2023 | Southeast Asian Games | Phnom Penh, Cambodia | |
| 200 m freestyle | 2:12.85 | | Haley Sakbun | - | | - | | |
| 400 m freestyle | 5:12.76 | | Carla La Planeta | EFI Cambodge | 28 November 25 | Phnom Penh Plunge | Phnom Penh, Cambodia | |
| 800 m freestyle | | | | | | | | |
| 1500 m freestyle | | | | | | | | |
| 50 m backstroke | 31.83 | h | Chanchakriya Kheun | Cambodia | 7 May 2023 | Southeast Asian Games | Phnom Penh, Cambodia | |
| 100 m backstroke | 1:07.44 | | Katarina Sakbun | - | | - | | |
| 200 m backstroke | 2:47.00 | | Sreyvorleak Chhorm | - | | - | | |
| 50 m breaststroke | 33.61 | | Voleak Sok | Cambodia | | - | | |
| 100 m breaststroke | 1:14.01 | | Voleak Sok | - | | - | | |
| 200 m breaststroke | 2:45.22 | h | Voleak Sok | Cambodia | 15 May 2022 | Southeast Asian Games | Hanoi, Vietnam | |
| 50 m butterfly | 32.38 | h | Hem Thon Vitiny | Cambodia | 26 July 2019 | World Championships | Gwangju, South Korea | |
| 100 m butterfly | 1:18.67 | h | Geanchhay Vaught | Cambodia | 19 May 2022 | Southeast Asian Games | Hanoi, Vietnam | |
| 200 m butterfly | | | | | | | | |
| 200 m individual medley | 2:40.50 | h | Minnich Lu-Si Tan | Cambodia | 14 May 2022 | Southeast Asian Games | Hanoi, Vietnam | |
| 400 m individual medley | | | | | | | | |
| 4×100 m freestyle relay | 4:22.10 | | Minnich Lu-Si Tan (1:06.14); Chanchakriya Kheun (1:04.62); Vaught Geanchhay (1:07.56); Vorleak Sok (1:03.78) | Cambodia | 15 May 2022 | Southeast Asian Games | Hanoi, Vietnam | |
| 4×200 m freestyle relay | | | | | | | | |
| 4×100 m medley relay | 4:30.72 | | Chanchakriya Kheun (1:10.68); Vorleak Sok (1:13.63); Haley Sakbun (1:07.62); Katarina Sakbun (58.79) | Cambodia | 11 May 2023 | Southeast Asian Games | Phnom Penh, Cambodia | |

Legend: # – Record awaiting ratification by Khmer Amateur Swimming Federation; WR – World record; AS – Asian record;
Records not set in finals: h – heat; sf – semifinal; r – relay 1st leg; rh – relay heat 1st leg; b – B final; † – en route to final mark; so – swim-off; tt – time trial

== Short Course (25 m) ==
=== Men ===
| Event | Time | | Name | Club | Date | Meet | Location | Ref |
|---|---|---|---|---|---|---|---|---|
| 50m freestyle | 23.27 | h | Antoine De Lapparent | Cambodia | 14 December 2024 | World Championships | Budapest, Hungary | |
| 100m freestyle | 51.52 | h | Antoine De Lapparent | Cambodia | 11 December 2024 | World Championships | Budapest, Hungary | |
| 200m freestyle | 1:55.58 | | Antoine De Lapparent | SN Metz | 15 October 2023 | Saint-Dizier International Swimming Meet | Saint-Dizier, France | |
| 400m freestyle | 4:07.93 | | Antoine De Lapparent | SN Metz | 22 October 2022 | Saint-Dizier International Swimming Meet | Saint-Dizier, France | |
| 800m freestyle | 11:34.68 | | Chamraen Youri Maximov | Aquadragons Club | 6 March 2008 | JIS Aquadragons Spring Invitational | Jakarta, Indonesia | |
| 1500m freestyle | | | | | | | | |
| 50m backstroke | 25.95 | | Antoine De Lapparent | SN Metz | 14 October 2023 | Saint-Dizier International Swimming Meet | Saint-Dizier, France | |
| 100m backstroke | 57.71 | | Antoine De Lapparent | SN Metz | 15 October 2023 | Saint-Dizier International Swimming Meet | Saint-Dizier, France | |
| 200m backstroke | 2:05.35 | | Antoine De Lapparent | SN Metz | 14 October 2023 | Saint-Dizier International Swimming Meet | Saint-Dizier, France | |
| 50m breaststroke | 31.83 | h | Hem Thon Ponleu | Cambodia | 15 December 2012 | World Championships | Istanbul, Turkey | |
| 100m breaststroke | 1:18.17 | | Chamraen Youri Maximov | Royal Sport Club "Nautilus" | 16 May 2010 | DTAC ISB Splash Meet | Bangkok, Thailand | |
| 200m breaststroke | 2:48.76 | | Chamraen Youri Maximov | Aquadragons Club | 30 May 2009 | JIS Aquadragons Record Slayer Meet | Jakarta, Indonesia | |
| 50m butterfly | 25.75 | h, † | Mathew Bennici | Cambodia | 17 December 2021 | World Championships | Abu Dhabi, United Arab Emirates | |
| 100m butterfly | 55.60 | h | Mathew Bennici | Cambodia | 17 December 2021 | World Championships | Abu Dhabi, United Arab Emirates | |
| 200m butterfly | 2:00.95 | h | Mathew Bennici | Cambodia | 16 December 2021 | World Championships | Abu Dhabi, United Arab Emirates | |
| 100m individual medley | 1:00.35 | h | Antoine De Lapparent | SN Metz | 22 October 2022 | Saint-Dizier International Swimming Meet | Saint-Dizier, France | |
| 200m individual medley | 2:30.90 | | Chamraen Youri Maximov | Royal Sport Club "Nautilus" | 15 May 2010 | DTAC ISB Splash Meet | Bangkok, Thailand | |
| 400m individual medley | 5:29.25 | | Chamraen Youri Maximov | Royal Sport Club "Nautilus" | 16 May 2010 | DTAC ISB Splash Meet | Bangkok, Thailand | |
| 4×50m freestyle relay | | | | | | | | |
| 4×100m freestyle relay | | | | | | | | |
| 4×200m freestyle relay | | | | | | | | |
| 4×50m medley relay | | | | | | | | |
| 4×100m medley relay | | | | | | | | |

Legend: # – Record awaiting ratification by Khmer Amateur Swimming Federation; WR – World record; AS – Asian record;
Records not set in finals: h – heat; sf – semifinal; r – relay 1st leg; rh – relay heat 1st leg; b – B final; † – en route to final mark; so – swim-off; tt – time trial

=== Women ===
| Event | Time | | Name | Club | Date | Meet | Location | Ref |
|---|---|---|---|---|---|---|---|---|
| 50m freestyle | 28.42 | h | Muynin Kaing | Cambodia | 20 December 2021 | World Championships | Abu Dhabi, United Arab Emirates | |
| 100 m freestyle | | | | | | | | |
| 200 m freestyle | | | | | | | | |
| 400 m freestyle | | | | | | | | |
| 800 m freestyle | | | | | | | | |
| 1500 m freestyle | | | | | | | | |
| 50m backstroke | 36.72 | h | Hem Thon Vitiny | Cambodia | 6 December 2014 | World Championships | Doha, Qatar | |
| 100m backstroke | | | | | | | | |
| 200m backstroke | | | | | | | | |
| 50m breaststroke | 34.52 | h | Vorleak Sok | Cambodia | 11 December 2018 | World Championships | Hangzhou, China | |
| 100m breaststroke | 1:15.37 | h | Vorleak Sok | Cambodia | 14 December 2018 | World Championships | Hangzhou, China | |
| 200 m breaststroke | | | | | | | | |
| 50m butterfly | 30.77 | h | Muynin Kaing | Cambodia | 18 December 2021 | World Championships | Abu Dhabi, United Arab Emirates | |
| 100m butterfly | 1:08.68 | h | Mei-Li Tan Minnich | Cambodia | 20 December 2021 | World Championships | Abu Dhabi, United Arab Emirates | |
| 200 m butterfly | | | | | | | | |
| 100 m individual medley | | | | | | | | |
| 200 m individual medley | | | | | | | | |
| 400 m individual medley | | | | | | | | |
| 4×50 m freestyle relay | | | | | | | | |
| 4×100 m freestyle relay | | | | | | | | |
| 4×200 m freestyle relay | | | | | | | | |
| 4×50 m medley relay | | | | | | | | |
| 4×100 m medley relay | | | | | | | | |

Legend: # – Record awaiting ratification by Khmer Amateur Swimming Federation; WR – World record; AS – Asian record;
Records not set in finals: h – heat; sf – semifinal; r – relay 1st leg; rh – relay heat 1st leg; b – B final; † – en route to final mark; so – swim-off; tt – time trial
