= Cambodia at the 2020 Summer Olympics =

- IOC code: CAM
- NOC: National Olympic Committee of Cambodia
- Website: www.noccambodia.org (in Khmer and English)

in Tokyo, Japan July 23, 2021 – August 8, 2021
- Competitors: 3 in 2 sports
- Flag bearers (opening): Kheun Bunpichmorakat; Pen Sokong
- Flag bearer (closing): N/A
- Medals: Gold 0 Silver 0 Bronze 0 Total 0

Summer Olympics appearances (overview)
- 1956; 1960; 1964; 1968; 1972; 1976–1992; 1996; 2000; 2004; 2008; 2012; 2016; 2020; 2024

Cambodia competed at the 2020 Summer Olympics in Tokyo. Originally scheduled to take place from 24 July to 9 August 2020, the Games have been postponed to 23 July to 8 August 2021, because of the COVID-19 pandemic. It was the nation's tenth appearance at the Summer Olympics after its debut at the 1956 Summer Olympics.

Cambodia was represented by three athletes who competed across two sports. Kheun Bunpichmorakat and Pen Sokong served as the country's flag-bearers during the opening ceremony and a volunteer carried the flag during the closing ceremony. The nation did not win any medals in the Games.

== Background ==
The 1956 Summer Olympics marked Cambodia's first participation as Khmer Republic in the Olympic Games. The National Olympic Committee of Cambodia was approved by the International Olympic Committee (IOC) in 1994. After the nation made its debut in the Summer Olympics at the 1956 Games, this edition of the Games in 2020 marked the nation's tenth appearance at the Summer fGames.

The 2020 Summer Olympics in Tokyo was originally scheduled to take place from 24 July to 9 August 2020. The Games were later postponed to 23 July to 8 August 2021 due to the COVID-19 pandemic. Cambodia was represented by three athletes who competed across two sports. Kheun Bunpichmorakat and Pen Sokong served as the country's flag-bearers during the opening ceremony and a volunteer carried the flag during the closing ceremony. The nation did not win any medals in the Games.

== Competitors ==
Cambodia was represented by three athletes who competed across two sports.

Sport	Men	Women	Total
Athletics	1	0	1
Swimming	1	1	2
Total	2	1	3

== Athletics ==
As per the governing body World Athletics (WA), a NOC was allowed to enter up to three qualified athletes in each individual event and one qualified relay team if the Olympic Qualifying Standards (OQS) for the respective events had been met during the qualifying period. The remaining places were allocated based on the World Athletics Rankings which were derived from the average of the best five results for an athlete over the designated qualifying period, weighted by the importance of the meet. Cambodia received universality slots from IAAF to send one athlete to the Olympics.

Pen Sokong made his debut at the Summer Olympics, and this was his only participation in the Summer Games. In the Men's 100 m event, Sokong failed to get past the preliminary heats.

Key

- Note–Ranks given for track events are within the athlete's heat only
- Q = Qualified for the next round
- q = Qualified for the next round as a fastest loser or, in field events, by position without achieving the qualifying target
- NR = National record
- N/A = Round not applicable for the event
- Bye = Athlete not required to compete in round

Track & road events

Athlete	Event	Heat		Quarterfinal		Semifinal		Final	
Athlete	Event	Result	Rank	Result	Rank	Result	Rank	Result	Rank
Pen Sokong	Men's 100 m	11.02	6	Did not advance					

== Swimming ==
As per the Fédération internationale de natation (FINA) guidelines, a NOC was permitted to enter a maximum of two qualified athletes in each individual event, who have achieved the Olympic Qualifying Time (OQT). If the quota was not filled, one athlete per event was allowed to enter, provided they achieved the Olympic Selection Time (OST). The qualifying time standards should have been achieved in competitions approved by World Aquatics in the period between 1 March 2019 to 27 June 2021. FINA also allowed NOCs to enter swimmers (one per gender) under a universality place even if they have not achieved the standard entry times (OQT/OST). Cambodia received a universality invitation from FINA to send two top-ranked swimmers (one per gender) in their respective individual events to the Olympics, based on the FINA Points System of 28 June 021.

The swimming events took place at the Olympic Aquatics Centre, in Tatsumi-no-Mori Seaside Park, Tokyo. Bunpichmorakat Kheun finished 65th in the heats (amongst the 81 participants) in the women's 50 m freestyle event and did not advance to the finals. In the men's 50 m freestyle, Puch Hem finished 52nd out of the 73 participants and failed to progress beyond the heats. This was the debut and only Olympic participation for both the athletes.

Athlete	Event	Heat		Semifinal		Final	
Athlete	Event	Time	Rank	Time	Rank	Time	Rank
Puch Hem	Men's 50 m freestyle	24.91	52	Did not advance			
Bunpichmorakat Kheun	Women's 50 m freestyle	29.42	65	Did not advance			
