= Cambodia at the 2000 Summer Olympics =

- Flag of Cambodia
- IOC code: CAM
- NOC: National Olympic Committee of Cambodia
- Website: www.noccambodia.org (in Khmer and English)

in Sydney
- Competitors: 4 (2 men and 2 women) in 2 sports
- Flag bearer: To Rithya
- Medals: Gold 0 Silver 0 Bronze 0 Total 0

Summer Olympics appearances (overview)
- 1956; 1960; 1964; 1968; 1972; 1976–1992; 1996; 2000; 2004; 2008; 2012; 2016; 2020; 2024

Cambodia competed at the 2000 Summer Olympics in Sydney, Australia.

Sydney 2000 marked the first time the Cambodian Olympic team competed in Australia as Cambodia and other nations boycotted the 1956 Summer Olympics in Melbourne due to the Suez Crisis but Cambodia did take part in the Equestrian events at the 1956 Summer Olympics in Stockholm five months earlier.

== Competitors ==
The following is the list of number of competitors in the Games.

Sport	Men	Women	Total
Athletics	1	1	2
Swimming	1	1	2
Total	2	2	4

== Athletics ==
Key

- Note–Ranks given for track events are within the athlete's heat only
- Q = Qualified for the next round
- q = Qualified for the next round as a fastest loser or, in field events, by position without achieving the qualifying target
- NR = National record
- N/A = Round not applicable for the event
- Bye = Athlete not required to compete in round

Men

Athlete	Event	Final	
Athlete	Event	Result	Rank
To Rithya	Marathon	3:03:56	80

Women

Athlete	Event	Heat		Quarterfinal		Semifinal		Final	
Athlete	Event	Result	Rank	Result	Rank	Result	Rank	Result	Rank
Ouk Chanthan	100 m	14.13	8	did not advance					

== Swimming ==
Men

Athlete	Event	Heat		Semifinal		Final	
Athlete	Event	Time	Rank	Time	Rank	Time	Rank
Hem Kiri	50 m freestyle	26.41	66	did not advance			

Women

Athlete	Event	Heat		Semifinal		Final	
Athlete	Event	Time	Rank	Time	Rank	Time	Rank
Hem Raksmey	50 m freestyle	33.11	70	did not advance			

== Sources ==
- Official Olympic Reports
- sports-reference
