= Cambodia at the 2012 Summer Olympics =

- Flag of Cambodia
- IOC code: CAM
- NOC: National Olympic Committee of Cambodia
- Website: www.noccambodia.org (in Khmer and English)

in London
- Competitors: 6 in 4 sports
- Flag bearer: Sorn Davin
- Medals: Gold 0 Silver 0 Bronze 0 Total 0

Summer Olympics appearances (overview)
- 1956; 1960; 1964; 1968; 1972; 1976–1992; 1996; 2000; 2004; 2008; 2012; 2016; 2020; 2024

Cambodia, which is represented by the National Olympic Committee of Cambodia (NOCC), competed at the 2012 Summer Olympics in London from 27 July to 12 August 2012. Six Cambodian athletes competed in the disciplines of track and field athletics, swimming, taekwondo, and judo.

== Background ==
Since their first appearance in equestrian at the 1956 Summer Olympics, Cambodia has sent 37 participants to seven editions of the Summer Olympic Games, making 2012 their fifth consecutive Games and eighth overall. Athletes from Cambodia have competed in seven distinct sports since 1956, although since 2000 their delegation has consisted of only track and field athletes and swimmers. The nation has never participated in the Winter Olympics nor has it ever won a medal.

Four Cambodian athletes received special scholarships from the International Olympic Committee (IOC) to help them qualify for the 2012 Summer Olympics: Chov Sotheara, who won wrestling gold at the 2009 Southeast Asian Games, Sorn Davin, a silver medalist in taekwondo at the 2011 Southeast Asian Games, Phal Sophat, who captured a silver medal in boxing at the 2009 Southeast Asian Games, and athlete Sar Choub Veasna. Both Davin and Sotheara failed to qualify through normal means and thus required a wild card bid from the IOC. Cambodia received a wild card for taekwondo in April 2012, which was given to Davin. The National Olympic Committee of Cambodia (NOCC) also nominated Ratanakmony Khom, a silver medalist in judo at the 2011 Southeast Asian Games, and athlete Kheang Samon for wild card spots. Ratnakmony received his invitation to attend the Games in June 2012.

== Athletics ==
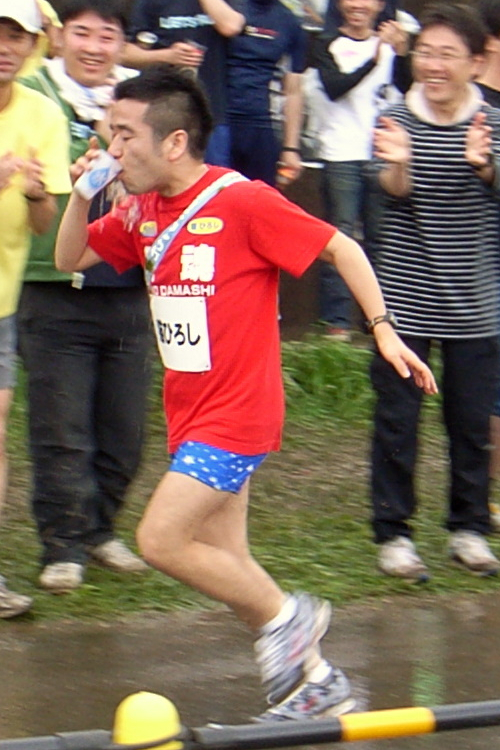
Neko Hiroshi running a marathon

In March 2012 the NOCC announced that Japanese comedian Neko Hiroshi had been nominated to represent Cambodia in the marathon at the 2012 Olympics, having been chosen for a "special exemption" after no Cambodian athletes met the qualifying standard. Hiroshi, a naturalized Cambodian citizen since 2011, had participated in half-marathons held in Cambodia for over a year and reached the podium at least twice, earning him a national fan base. He received criticism from, among others, Japanese double Olympic marathon medalist Yuko Arimori, whose charity helps develop and train Cambodian athletes in addition to funding their journeys to international competitions. Opponents of Hiroshi's selection for the Olympic Games claim that there are Cambodian-born athletes more deserving of the special exemption, such as Hem Bunting who has won two long-distance medals at the Southeast Asian Games since 2007. The International Association of Athletics Federations rejected his nomination, however, on the grounds that Hiroshi was ineligible to compete internationally until October 2012, as individuals with new nationalities must wait one year from the date of their citizenship before they can represent the nation on the world stage. They also refused to wave this requirement for Hiroshi, deciding that it was not a circumstance that warranted such an action.

Chan Seyha, who competed in the 200 metre event at the 2011 World Championships in Athletics, ran in the same distance at the 2012 Olympics and Samorn Kieng participated in the men's 800m event.

Key

- Note–Ranks given for track events are within the athlete's heat only
- Q = Qualified for the next round
- q = Qualified for the next round as a fastest loser or, in field events, by position without achieving the qualifying target
- NR = National record
- N/A = Round not applicable for the event
- Bye = Athlete not required to compete in round

Men

Athlete	Event	Heat		Semifinal		Final	
Athlete	Event	Result	Rank	Result	Rank	Result	Rank
Samorn Kieng	800 m	1:55.26	8	Did not advance			

Women

Athlete	Event	Heat		Semifinal		Final	
Athlete	Event	Result	Rank	Result	Rank	Result	Rank
Chan Seyha	200 m	26.62	9	Did not advance			

== Judo ==
Ratanakmony Khom, a silver medalist at the 2011 Southeast Asian Games in the men's 50–55 kg judo competition, represented Cambodia in the men's 60 kg event at the 2012 Summer Olympics.

Athlete	Event	Round of 64	Round of 32	Round of 16	Quarterfinals	Semifinals	Repechage	Final / BM	
Athlete	Event	Opposition Result	Opposition Result	Opposition Result	Opposition Result	Opposition Result	Opposition Result	Opposition Result	Rank
Ratanakmony Khom	Men's −60 kg	Bye	Castillo (MEX); L 0000–0100	Did not advance					

== Swimming ==
Hemthon Vitiny, who competed in the women's 50 metre freestyle event at the 2008 Summer Olympics participated in the same event at the 2012 Games. Cambodia had one more guaranteed spot for a swimmer in their delegation, which was taken by Ponloeu Hemthon, who competed in the men's 50 metre freestyle.

Men

Athlete	Event	Heat		Semifinal		Final	
Athlete	Event	Time	Rank	Time	Rank	Time	Rank
Hemthon Ponloeu	50 m freestyle	23.17	48	Did not advance			

Women

Athlete	Event	Heat		Semifinal		Final	
Athlete	Event	Time	Rank	Time	Rank	Time	Rank
Hemthon Vitiny	50 m freestyle	25.03	57	Did not advance			

== Taekwondo ==
Cambodia was given a wild card entrant for taekwondo, allowing Sorn Davin, a silver medalist in taekwondo at the 2011 Southeast Asian Games, to participate.

Athlete	Event	Round of 16	Quarterfinals	Semifinals	Repechage	Bronze Medal	Final	
Athlete	Event	Opposition Result	Opposition Result	Opposition Result	Opposition Result	Opposition Result	Opposition Result	Rank
Sorn Davin	Women's +67 kg	Espinoza (MEX); L 2–3	Did not advance					

== See also ==
- Cambodia at the 2012 Summer Paralympics
