= Cambodia at the 2004 Summer Olympics =

- Flag of Cambodia
- IOC code: CAM
- NOC: National Olympic Committee of Cambodia
- Website: www.noccambodia.org (in Khmer and English)

in Athens
- Competitors: 4 in 2 sports
- Flag bearer: Hem Kiri
- Medals: Gold 0 Silver 0 Bronze 0 Total 0

Summer Olympics appearances (overview)
- 1956; 1960; 1964; 1968; 1972; 1976–1992; 1996; 2000; 2004; 2008; 2012; 2016; 2020; 2024

Cambodia was represented at the 2004 Summer Olympics in Athens, Greece by the National Olympic Committee of Cambodia.

In total, four athletes including two men and two women represented Cambodia in two different sports including athletics and swimming.

== Competitors ==
In total, four athletes represented Cambodia at the 2004 Summer Olympics in Athens, Greece across two different sports.

Sport	Men	Women	Total
Athletics	1	1	2
Swimming	1	1	2
Total	2	2	4

== Athletics ==
In total, two Cambodian athletes participated in the athletics events – Sopheak Phouk in the men's 100 m and Tit Linda Sou in the women's 100 m.

Most of the athletics events – including those which Cambodian athletes took part in – took place at the Athens Olympic Stadium in Marousi, Athens from 18 to 29 August 2004.

The heats for the men's 100 m took place on 21 August 2004. Phouk finished eighth in his heat in a time of 11.56 seconds and he did not advance to the quarter-finals.

Athlete	Event	Heat		Quarterfinal		Semifinal		Final	
Athlete	Event	Result	Rank	Result	Rank	Result	Rank	Result	Rank
Sopheak Phouk	100 m	11.58	8	did not advance					

The heats for the women's 100 m took place on 20 August 2004. Sou finished seventh in her heat in a time of 13.47 seconds and she did not advance to the quarter-finals.

Athlete	Event	Heat		Quarterfinal		Semifinal		Final	
Athlete	Event	Result	Rank	Result	Rank	Result	Rank	Result	Rank
Tit Linda Sou	100 m	13.47	7	did not advance					

== Swimming ==
In total, two Cambodian athletes participated in the swimming events – Hem Kiri in the men's 50 m freestyle and Ket Sivan in the women's 50 m freestyle.

The swimming events took place at the Athens Olympic Aquatic Centre in Marousi, Athens from 14 to 21 August 2004.

The heats for the men's 50 m freestyle took place on 19 August 2004. Kiri finished fifth in his heat in a time of 27.49 seconds which was ultimately not fast enough to advance to the semi-finals.

Athlete	Event	Heat		Semifinal		Final	
Athlete	Event	Time	Rank	Time	Rank	Time	Rank
Hem Kiri	50 m freestyle	27.49	70	did not advance			

The heats for the women's 50 m freestyle took place on 20 August 2004. Sivan finished seventh in her heat in a time of 34.62 seconds which was ultimately not fast enough to advance to the semi-finals.

Athlete	Event	Heat		Semifinal		Final	
Athlete	Event	Time	Rank	Time	Rank	Time	Rank
Ket Sivan	50 m freestyle	34.62	71	did not advance			
