= Cambodia at the 1996 Summer Olympics =

- Flag of Cambodia
- IOC code: CAM
- NOC: National Olympic Committee of Cambodia
- Website: www.noccambodia.org (in Khmer and English)

in Atlanta
- Competitors: 5 in 3 sports
- Flag bearer: Rithya To
- Medals: Gold 0 Silver 0 Bronze 0 Total 0

Summer Olympics appearances (overview)
- 1956; 1960; 1964; 1968; 1972; 1976–1992; 1996; 2000; 2004; 2008; 2012; 2016; 2020; 2024

Cambodia competed at the 1996 Summer Olympics in Atlanta, United States. It was the first time the nation had participated in the Olympic Games in 24 years.

== Competitors ==
The following is the list of number of competitors in the Games.

Sport	Men	Women	Total
Athletics	1	1	2
Swimming	1	1	2
Wrestling	1	–	1
Total	3	2	5

== Athletics ==
Men

Athlete	Event	Final	
Athlete	Event	Result	Rank
To Rithya	Marathon	2:47:10	105

Women

Athlete	Event	Heat		Quarterfinal		Semifinal		Final	
Athlete	Event	Result	Rank	Result	Rank	Result	Rank	Result	Rank
Ouk Chanthan	100 m	14.82	7	did not advance					

== Swimming ==
Men

Athlete	Event	Heat		Final	
Athlete	Event	Time	Rank	Time	Rank
Hem Lumphat	200 metre individual medley	DSQ		did not advance	

Women

Athlete	Event	Heat		Final	
Athlete	Event	Time	Rank	Time	Rank
Hem Raksmey	100 m breaststroke	1:44.68	46	did not advance	

== Wrestling ==
Men's freestyle

Athlete	Event	Round 1	Round 2	Round 3	Round 4	Round 5	Round 6	Final / BM	
Athlete	Event	Opposition Result	Opposition Result	Opposition Result	Opposition Result	Opposition Result	Opposition Result	Opposition Result	Rank
Vath Chamroeun	−62 kg	Azizov (RUS); L 0–10	Zaslavsky (AUS); L 0–9	did not advance					17
