= Cambodia at the 2024 Summer Olympics =

- IOC code: CAM
- NOC: National Olympic Committee of Cambodia
- Website: olympiccambodia.com (in Khmer and English)

in Paris, France 26 July 2024 – 11 August 2024
- Competitors: 3 (2 men and 1 woman) in 2 sports
- Flag bearer (opening): Chhun Bunthorn & Apsara Sakbun
- Flag bearer (closing): Chhun Bunthorn & Apsara Sakbun
- Medals: Gold 0 Silver 0 Bronze 0 Total 0

Summer Olympics appearances (overview)
- 1956; 1960; 1964; 1968; 1972; 1976–1992; 1996; 2000; 2004; 2008; 2012; 2016; 2020; 2024

Cambodia competed at the 2024 Summer Olympics in Paris. This was the nation's eighth consecutive appearance at the Summer Olympics since returning to the Olympic Games in 1996.

== Competitors ==
The following is the list of number of competitors in the Games. All three Player athletes received wildcards tickets from the Olympics in 2024. They did not pass the qualified by themselves.

Sport	Men	Women	Total
Athletics	1	0	1
Swimming	1	1	2
Total	2	1	3

== Athletics ==
Cambodia sent one middle-distance runner to compete at the 2024 Summer Olympics.

Key

- Note–Ranks given for track events are within the athlete's heat only
- Q = Qualified for the next round
- q = Qualified for the next round as a fastest loser or, in field events, by position without achieving the qualifying target
- NR = National record
- N/A = Round not applicable for the event
- Bye = Athlete not required to compete in round

Track events

Athlete	Event	Heat		Repechage		Semifinal		Final	
Athlete	Event	Result	Rank	Result	Rank	Result	Rank	Result	Rank
Chhun Bunthorn	Men's 800 m	1:53.31	9	1:53.42	8	Did not advance			

== Swimming ==
Cambodia sent two expatriate swimmers to compete at the 2024 Paris Olympics, through the allocation of universality places.

Athlete	Event	Heat		Semifinal		Final	
Athlete	Event	Time	Rank	Time	Rank	Time	Rank
Antoine De Lapparent	Men's 100 m freestyle	52.95	67	Did not advance			
Apsara Sakbun	Women's 50 m freestyle	26.90	38	Did not advance			
