= Cambodia at the 1964 Summer Olympics =

- Flag of Cambodia
- IOC code: CAM (CAB used at these Games)
- NOC: National Olympic Committee of Cambodia
- Website: www.noccambodia.org (in Khmer and English)

in Tokyo
- Competitors: 13 in 3 sports
- Medals: Gold 0 Silver 0 Bronze 0 Total 0

Summer Olympics appearances (overview)
- 1956; 1960; 1964; 1968; 1972; 1976–1992; 1996; 2000; 2004; 2008; 2012; 2016; 2020; 2024

Cambodia competed at the 1964 Summer Olympics in Tokyo, Japan. The nation returned to the Olympic Games after missing the 1960 Summer Olympics. Thirteen competitors, all men, took part in ten events in three sports.

== Boxing ==
Men

Athlete	Event	1 Round	2 Round	3 Round	Quarterfinals	Semifinals	Final	
Athlete	Event	Opposition Result	Opposition Result	Opposition Result	Opposition Result	Opposition Result	Opposition Result	Rank
Sam An Ek	Bantamweight	N/A	Washington Rodríguez (URU); L 0–5	did not advance				17T
Soeun Khiru	Featherweight	N/A	Hugo Martínez (ARG); W RSC	Charles Brown (USA); L 1–4	did not advance			9T
Chin Hong You	Lightweight	Alex Odhiambo (UGA); L RSC	did not advance					33T
Nol Touch	Light welterweight	BYE	Brian Anderson (IRL); W 3–2	Eddie Blay (GHA); L KO	did not advance			9T

== Cycling ==
Six cyclists represented Cambodia in 1964.

=== Road ===
Athlete	Event	Time	Rank
Ret Chhon; Khem Son; Van Son; Yi Yuong	Team time trial	2:56:59.87	27

=== Track ===
1000m time trial

Athlete	Event	Time	Rank
Tan Thol	Men's 1000m time trial	1:18.20	22

Men's Sprint

Athlete	Event	Heats	Repechage 1	Repechage Finals	Round 2	Repechage 2	Repechage Finals	Quarterfinals	Semifinals	Final	
Athlete	Event	Time Speed (km/h)	Rank	Opposition Time Speed (km/h)	Opposition Time Speed (km/h)	Opposition Time Speed (km/h)	Opposition Time Speed (km/h)	Opposition Time Speed (km/h)	Opposition Time Speed (km/h)	Opposition Time Speed (km/h)	Rank
Tan Thol	Men's sprint	Morelon (FRA); Bustos (COL); L	Bicskey (HUN); Church (GBR); W 13.00	Fredborg (DEN); L	did not advance						
Tim Phivana	Men's sprint	Pettenella (ITA); Hoyte (TRI); L	Gibbon (TRI); Kawachi (JPN); L	did not advance							

Pursuit

Athlete	Event	Round of 16	Quarterfinals	Semifinals	Final	
Athlete	Event	Time	Rank	Opposition Time	Opposition Time	Opposition Rank
Khem Son	Men's individual pursuit	Choi (HKG); W 6:05.87	did not Qualify			19

== Sailing ==
Open

Athlete	Event	Race														Final rank	
Athlete	Event	1		2		3		4		5		6		7		Final rank	
Athlete	Event	Score	Rank	Score	Rank	Score	Rank	Score	Rank	Score	Rank	Score	Rank	Score	Rank	Score	Rank
Touch Kim Sy	Finn	30	142	~~DSQ~~	~~0~~	DNF	101	32	114	DNS	0	DNS	0	DNS	0	357	33
Dandara An; Tal Kim	Star	17	101	DNF	101	DNS	0	DNS	0	DNS	0	DNS	0	DNS	0	202	17
