= Cambodia at the 2016 Summer Olympics =

- Flag of Cambodia
- IOC code: CAM
- NOC: National Olympic Committee of Cambodia
- Website: www.noccambodia.org (in Khmer and English)

in Rio de Janeiro
- Competitors: 6 in 4 sports
- Flag bearer: Sorn Seavmey
- Medals: Gold 0 Silver 0 Bronze 0 Total 0

Summer Olympics appearances (overview)
- 1956; 1960; 1964; 1968; 1972; 1976–1992; 1996; 2000; 2004; 2008; 2012; 2016; 2020; 2024

Cambodia competed at the 2016 Summer Olympics in Rio de Janeiro, Brazil, from 5 to 21 August 2016. The nation's participation marked its sixth consecutive appearance at the Summer Olympics, although it had previously appeared in three editions (1956, 1964, and 1972) under the name Kampuchea.

National Olympic Committee of Cambodia sent a total of six athletes, two men and four women, to the Games, competing only in athletics, swimming, taekwondo, and freestyle wrestling, the country's sporting debut in Rio de Janeiro. Five of them, including freestyle swimmer and three-time Olympian Hemthon Vitiny, received their spots to compete at the Games by wild card entries. Taekwondo fighter Sorn Seavmey, the only qualified sportswoman on merit, led the team as Cambodia's flag bearer in the opening ceremony. Cambodia, however, has yet to win its first Olympic medal.

== Athletics ==
Cambodian athletes achieved qualifying standards in the following athletics events (up to a maximum of 3 athletes in each event):

Key

- Note – Ranks given for track events are within the athlete's heat only
- Q = Qualified for the next round
- q = Qualified for the next round as a fastest loser or, in field events, by position without achieving the qualifying target
- NR = National record
- N/A = Round not applicable for the event
- Bye = Athlete not required to compete in round

Track & road events

Athlete	Event	Final	
Athlete	Event	Result	Rank
Neko Hiroshi	Men's marathon	2:45:55	138
Nary Ly	Women's marathon	3:20:20	133

== Swimming ==
Cambodia received a Universality invitation from FINA to send two swimmers (one male and one female) to the Olympics.

Athlete	Event	Heat		Semifinal		Final	
Athlete	Event	Time	Rank	Time	Rank	Time	Rank
Pou Sovijja	Men's 100 m freestyle	54.55	57	Did not advance			
Hemthon Vitiny	Women's 50 m freestyle	29.37	66	Did not advance			

== Taekwondo ==
Cambodia entered one athlete into the taekwondo competition at the Olympics. Sorn Seavmey secured a spot in the women's heavyweight category (+67 kg) by virtue of her victory at the 2016 Asian Qualification Tournament in Manila, Philippines.

Moreover, Seavmey became the first athlete ever from her country to qualify for the Olympics on merit (all other athletes that have competed for Cambodia, have done so through invitational quotas).

Athlete	Event	Round of 16	Quarterfinals	Semifinals	Repechage	Final / BM	
Athlete	Event	Opposition Result	Opposition Result	Opposition Result	Opposition Result	Opposition Result	Rank
Sorn Seavmey	Women's +67 kg	Oogink (NED); L 1–7	Did not advance				

== Wrestling ==
Cambodia received an invitation from the Tripartite Commission to send a wrestler competing in the women's freestyle 48 kg category, signifying the nation's Olympic return to the sport for the first time since 1996.

Key

- VT - Victory by Fall.
- PP - Decision by Points - the loser with technical points.
- PO - Decision by Points - the loser without technical points.
- ST – Technical superiority – the loser without technical points and a margin of victory of at least 8 (Greco-Roman) or 10 (freestyle) points.

Women's freestyle

Athlete	Event	Qualification	Round of 16	Quarterfinal	Semifinal	Repechage 1	Repechage 2	Final / BM	
Athlete	Event	Opposition Result	Opposition Result	Opposition Result	Opposition Result	Opposition Result	Opposition Result	Opposition Result	Rank
Chov Sotheara	−48 kg	Bye	Castillo (COL); L 0–4 ^{ST}	Did not advance					16
