= 2020 Summer Olympics Parade of Nations =

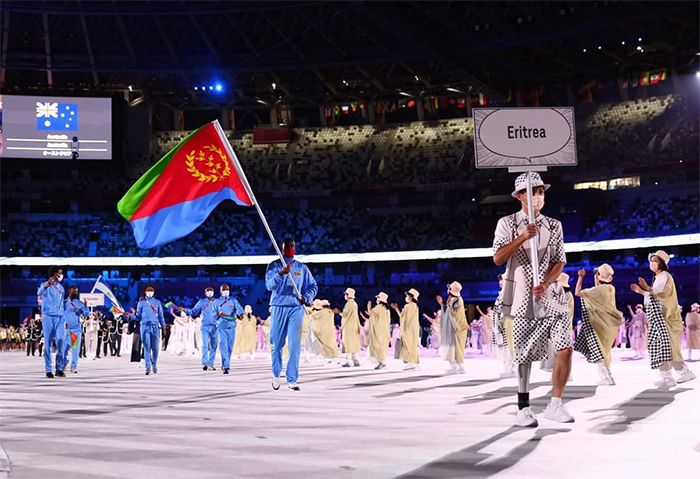
Eritrea at the 2020 Summer Olympics Parade of Nations, with Team El Salvador and Team Australia in the background.

During the Parade of Nations within the Tokyo 2020 Summer Olympics opening ceremony, which took place on 23 July 2021, athletes and officials from each participating team entered the Olympic Stadium preceded by their flag and placard bearer. Each flag bearer will have been chosen either by the team's National Olympic Committee or by the athletes themselves. For the first time, each team had the option to allow two flag bearers, one male and one female, in an effort to promote gender equality. These Olympics were postponed from 2020 due to the COVID-19 pandemic and due security measures some countries prevented their athletes to participate on event.

== Parade order ==
This was the first edition in which the new protocols approved at the 138th Session of the International Olympic Committee held days before the ceremony were used officially. Some rules were maintained from previous procedures, such as the obligation for the Greek delegation to be the first to enter during the Parade of Nations and the maintenance of the entry of other delegations in the alphabetical order of the organizing country were maintained as the same entering as the last team. However, others were changed, such as the entry of IOC Refugee Olympic Team, composed of refugees from several countries immediately behind the Greek team. Another change was the positioning of the teams whose countries will be the future hosts of the next Summer Olympic Games, which entered the reverse sequence. According to the original planning, the United States would be the 5th delegation to enter placed between Afghanistan and United Arab Emirates delegations, but as the 2028 Summer Olympics are scheduled to be held in Los Angeles, they were placed as 204th delegation. This situation also happened with France which according to the protocol manual would be the 151st delegation, positioned between Brazil and Bulgaria, but due to the fact that Paris will be the host city of the 2024 Summer Olympics who entered as the 205th delegation before the host nation Japan.

As these protocol rules were approved before Brisbane was announced as the 2032 Summer Olympics host, Australia was not allocated to enter before the United States team and retained in its natural position in the Japanese language order between El Salvador and Austria. Zimbabwe, which has usually been the penultimate nation, was positioned between Singapore and Switzerland, appearing in the middle of the parade. All other teams entered in between in Gojūon order, based on the names of countries in Japanese. The names of the teams were announced in French, English, and Japanese, the official languages of the Olympic movement and the host nation, in accordance with Olympic Charter and International Olympic Committee (IOC) guidelines.

The Republic of North Macedonia had previously competed under the provisional name of Former Yugoslav Republic of Macedonia, because of the disputed status of its official name. It was officially renamed to North Macedonia in February 2019 following Prespa Agreement and the Olympic Committee of North Macedonia (NMOC) was officially adopted in February 2020. It was North Macedonia's first appearance at the Summer Olympics under its new name North Macedonia (北マケドニア Kita Makedonia).

Several of the nations marched under their formal Japanese names. For example, the Great Britain delegation marched under the formal name Eikoku ("United Kingdom") rather than the better known informal Igirisu (イギリス), and China's delegation marched under Chūka Jinmin Kyōwakoku ("People's Republic of China") instead of the more common Chūgoku (中国).

The Hong Kong team marched under the name ホンコン・チャイナ (Honkon Chaina, i.e. 'Hong Kong, China'), derived from the English name, instead of the kanji names 香港 (Hon Kon), 香港中華 (Hon Kon Chūka) or 香港中華人民共和国 (Hon Kon Chūka Jinmin Kyōwakoku, 'Hong Kong, People's Republic of China) to avoid causing controversy.

On 6 April 2021, North Korea announced that it would not participate in the 2020 Summer Olympics because of COVID-19 concerns. This marked North Korea's first absence from the Summer Olympics since 1988. North Korea (朝鮮民主主義人民共和国 Chōsen Minshushugi Jinmin Kyōwakoku, "Democratic People's Republic of Korea") would have marched between Tunisia and Chile.

== Teams and flagbearers ==
On 4 March 2020, the IOC announced that each team can have the option to allow two flag bearers, one male and one female, in an effort to promote gender equality, after had been trialed in the 1980 Summer Olympics Parade of Nations.

Below is a list of parading teams and their announced flag bearer(s), in the same order as the parade. This is sortable by team name, flag bearer's name, and flag bearer's sport. This was the first time the Parade of Nations was conducted in Japanese order.

Order	Team	Japanese	Roman Transliteration (in Hepburn)	Flag bearer(s)	Sport(s)	Ref.
1	Greece	ギリシャ	Girisha	Anna Korakaki	Shooting	
1	Greece	ギリシャ	Girisha	Eleftherios Petrounias	Gymnastics	
2	Refugee Olympic Team	難民選手団	Nanmin Senshu-dan (Note: The team's full name is Équipe olympique des réfugiés/IOC Refugee Olympic Team/IOCオリンピック難民選手団. The displays and announcers used the full French name, and a shortened English and Japanese name.)	Yusra Mardini	Swimming	
2	Refugee Olympic Team	難民選手団	Nanmin Senshu-dan	Tachlowini Gabriyesos	Athletics	
3	Iceland	アイスランド	Aisurando	Snæfríður Jórunnardóttir	Swimming	
3	Iceland	アイスランド	Aisurando	Anton McKee	Swimming	
4	Ireland	アイルランド	Airurando	Kellie Harrington	Boxing	
4	Ireland	アイルランド	Airurando	Brendan Irvine	Boxing	
5	Azerbaijan	アゼルバイジャン	Azerubaijan	Farida Azizova	Taekwondo	
5	Azerbaijan	アゼルバイジャン	Azerubaijan	Rustam Orujov	Judo	
6	Afghanistan	アフガニスタン	Afuganisutan	Farzad Mansouri	Taekwondo	
6	Afghanistan	アフガニスタン	Afuganisutan	Kamia Yousufi	Athletics	
7	United Arab Emirates	アラブ首長国連邦	Arabu Shuchōkoku Renpō	Yousuf Al-Matrooshi	Swimming	
8	Algeria	アルジェリア	Arujeria	Amel Melih	Swimming	
8	Algeria	アルジェリア	Arujeria	Mohamed Flissi	Boxing	
9	Argentina	アルゼンチン	Aruzenchin	Cecilia Carranza	Sailing	
9	Argentina	アルゼンチン	Aruzenchin	Santiago Lange	Sailing	
10	Aruba	アルバ	Aruba	Allyson Ponson	Swimming	
10	Aruba	アルバ	Aruba	Mikel Schreuders	Swimming	
11	Albania	アルバニア	Arubania	Luiza Gega	Athletics	
11	Albania	アルバニア	Arubania	Briken Calja	Weightlifting	
12	Armenia	アルメニア	Arumenia	Varsenik Manucharyan	Swimming	
12	Armenia	アルメニア	Arumenia	Hovhannes Bachkov	Boxing	
13	Angola	アンゴラ	Angora	Natália Santos	Handball	
13	Angola	アンゴラ	Angora	Matias Montinho	Sailing	
14	Antigua and Barbuda	アンティグア・バーブーダ	Antigua Bābūda	Samantha Roberts	Swimming	
14	Antigua and Barbuda	アンティグア・バーブーダ	Antigua Bābūda	Cejhae Greene	Athletics	
15	Andorra	アンドラ	Andora	Mònica Dòria	Canoeing	
15	Andorra	アンドラ	Andora	Pol Moya	Athletics	
16	Yemen	イエメン	Iemen	Yasameen Al Raimi	Shooting	
16	Yemen	イエメン	Iemen	Ahmed Ayash	Judo	
17	Israel	イスラエル	Isuraeru	Hanna Knyazyeva-Minenko	Athletics	
17	Israel	イスラエル	Isuraeru	Yakov Toumarkin	Swimming	
18	Italy	イタリア	Itaria	Jessica Rossi	Shooting	
18	Italy	イタリア	Itaria	Elia Viviani	Cycling	
19	Iraq	イラク	Iraku	Fatimah Al-Kaabi	Shooting	
19	Iraq	イラク	Iraku	Mohammed Al-Khafaji	Rowing	
20	Islamic Republic of Iran	イラン・イスラム共和国	Iran Isuramu Kyōwakoku	Hanieh Rostamian	Shooting	
20	Islamic Republic of Iran	イラン・イスラム共和国	Iran Isuramu Kyōwakoku	Samad Nikkhah Bahrami	Basketball	
21	India	インド	Indo	Mary Kom	Boxing	
21	India	インド	Indo	Manpreet Singh	Field hockey	
22	Indonesia	インドネシア	Indoneshia	Rio Waida (Note: In fact, based on citations to other references with photos, Rio Waida eventually became the sole flagbearer for the parade of nations during the opening ceremony. Nurul Akmal, who was originally chosen and mentioned on the Tokyo 2020 official website as the nation's de jure co-flagbearer, did not wear the traditional attire. Instead, she wore the contingent uniform and walked alongside other participants and coaches.)	Surfing	
23	Uganda	ウガンダ	Uganda	Kirabo Namutebi	Swimming	
23	Uganda	ウガンダ	Uganda	Shadiri Bwogi	Boxing	
24	Ukraine	ウクライナ	Ukuraina	Olena Kostevych	Shooting	
24	Ukraine	ウクライナ	Ukuraina	Bohdan Nikishyn	Fencing	
25	Uzbekistan	ウズベキスタン	Uzubekisutan	Nigora Tursunkulova	Taekwondo	
25	Uzbekistan	ウズベキスタン	Uzubekisutan	Bakhodir Jalolov	Boxing	
26	Uruguay	ウルグアイ	Uruguai	Déborah Rodríguez	Athletics	
26	Uruguay	ウルグアイ	Uruguai	Bruno Cetraro	Rowing	
27	Great Britain	英国	Eikoku	Hannah Mills	Sailing	
27	Great Britain	英国	Eikoku	Moe Sbihi	Rowing	
28	Virgin Islands, British	英領バージン諸島	Ei-ryō Bājin Shotō	Elinah Phillip	Swimming	
28	Virgin Islands, British	英領バージン諸島	Ei-ryō Bājin Shotō	Kyron McMaster	Athletics	
29	Ecuador	エクアドル	Ekuadoru	Alexandra Escobar	Weightlifting	
29	Ecuador	エクアドル	Ekuadoru	Julio Castillo	Boxing	
30	Egypt	エジプト	Ejiputo	Hedaya Malak	Taekwondo	
30	Egypt	エジプト	Ejiputo	Alaaeldin Abouelkassem	Fencing	
31	Estonia	エストニア	Esutonia	Dina Ellermann	Equestrian	
31	Estonia	エストニア	Esutonia	Tõnu Endrekson	Rowing	
32	Eswatini	エスワティニ	Esuwatini	Robyn Young	Swimming	
32	Eswatini	エスワティニ	Esuwatini	Thabiso Dlamini	Boxing	
33	Ethiopia	エチオピア	Echiopia	Abdelmalik Muktar	Swimming	
34	Eritrea	エリトリア	Eritoria	Nazret Weldu	Athletics	
34	Eritrea	エリトリア	Eritoria	Ghirmai Efrem	Swimming	
35	El Salvador	エルサルバドル	Erusarubadoru	Celina Márquez	Swimming	
35	El Salvador	エルサルバドル	Erusarubadoru	Enrique Arathoon	Sailing	
36	Australia	オーストラリア	Ōsutoraria	Cate Campbell	Swimming	
36	Australia	オーストラリア	Ōsutoraria	Patty Mills	Basketball	
37	Austria	オーストリア	Ōsutoria	Tanja Frank	Sailing	
37	Austria	オーストリア	Ōsutoria	Thomas Zajac	Sailing	
38	Oman	オマーン	Omān	Issa Al-Adawi	Swimming	
39	Netherlands	オランダ	Oranda	Keet Oldenbeuving	Skateboarding	
39	Netherlands	オランダ	Oranda	Churandy Martina	Athletics	
40	Ghana	ガーナ	Gāna	Nadia Eke	Athletics	
40	Ghana	ガーナ	Gāna	Sulemanu Tetteh	Boxing	
41	Cape Verde	カーボベルデ	Kāboberude	Jayla Pina	Swimming	
41	Cape Verde	カーボベルデ	Kāboberude	Jordin Andrade	Athletics	
42	Guyana	ガイアナ	Gaiana	Chelsea Edghill	Table tennis	
42	Guyana	ガイアナ	Gaiana	Andrew Fowler	Swimming	
43	Kazakhstan	カザフスタン	Kazafusutan	Olga Rypakova	Athletics	
43	Kazakhstan	カザフスタン	Kazafusutan	Kamshybek Kunkabayev	Boxing	
44	Qatar	カタール	Katāru	Tala Abujbara	Rowing	
44	Qatar	カタール	Katāru	Mohammed Al-Rumaihi	Shooting	
45	Canada	カナダ	Kanada	Miranda Ayim	Basketball	
45	Canada	カナダ	Kanada	Nathan Hirayama	Rugby sevens	
46	Gabon	ガボン	Gabon	Aya Girard de Langlade Mpali	Swimming	
46	Gabon	ガボン	Gabon	Anthony Mylann Obame	Taekwondo	
47	Cameroon	カメルーン	Kamerūn	Joseph Essombe	Wrestling	
47	Cameroon	カメルーン	Kamerūn	Albert Mengue Ayissi	Boxing	
48	Gambia	ガンビア	Ganbia	Gina Bass	Athletics	
48	Gambia	ガンビア	Ganbia	Ebrima Camara	Athletics	
49	Cambodia	カンボジア	Kanbojia	Kheun Bunpichmorakat	Swimming	
49	Cambodia	カンボジア	Kanbojia	Pen Sokong	Athletics	
50	North Macedonia	北マケドニア	Kita Makedonia	Arbresha Rexhepi	Taekwondo	
50	North Macedonia	北マケドニア	Kita Makedonia	Dejan Georgievski	Taekwondo	
51	Guinea	ギニア	Ginia	Games Volunteer	N/A	
52	Guinea-Bissau	ギニアビサウ	Giniabisau	Taciana Cesar	Judo	
52	Guinea-Bissau	ギニアビサウ	Giniabisau	Augusto Midana	Wrestling	
53	Cyprus	キプロス	Kipurosu	Andri Eleftheriou	Shooting	
53	Cyprus	キプロス	Kipurosu	Pavlos Kontides	Sailing	
54	Cuba	キューバ	Kyūba	Yaime Pérez	Athletics	
54	Cuba	キューバ	Kyūba	Mijaín López Núñez	Wrestling	
55	Kiribati	キリバス	Kiribasu	Kinaua Biribo	Judo	
55	Kiribati	キリバス	Kiribasu	Ruben Katoatau	Weightlifting	
56	Kyrgyzstan	キルギス	Kirugisu	Kanykei Kubanychbekova	Shooting	
56	Kyrgyzstan	キルギス	Kirugisu	Denis Petrashov	Swimming	
57	Guatemala	グアテマラ	Guatemara	Isabella Maegli	Sailing	
57	Guatemala	グアテマラ	Guatemara	Juan Ignacio Maegli	Sailing	
58	Guam	グアム	Guamu	Regine Tugade-Watson	Athletics	
58	Guam	グアム	Guamu	Joshter Andrew	Judo	
59	Kuwait	クウェート	Kuwēto	Lara Dashti	Swimming	
59	Kuwait	クウェート	Kuwēto	Talal Al-Rashidi	Shooting	
60	Cook Islands	クック諸島	Kukku Shotō	Kirsten Fisher-Marsters	Swimming	
60	Cook Islands	クック諸島	Kukku Shotō	Wesley Roberts	Swimming	
61	Grenada	グレナダ	Gurenada	Kimberly Ince	Swimming	
61	Grenada	グレナダ	Gurenada	Delron Felix	Swimming	
62	Croatia	クロアチア	Kuroachia	Sandra Perković	Athletics	
62	Croatia	クロアチア	Kuroachia	Josip Glasnović	Shooting	
63	Cayman Islands	ケイマン諸島	Keiman Shotō	Jillian Crooks	Swimming	
63	Cayman Islands	ケイマン諸島	Keiman Shotō	Brett Fraser	Swimming	
64	Kenya	ケニア	Kenia	Mercy Moim	Volleyball	
64	Kenya	ケニア	Kenia	Andrew Amonde	Rugby sevens	
65	Côte d'Ivoire	コートジボワール	Kōtojibowāru	Marie-Josée Ta Lou	Athletics	
65	Côte d'Ivoire	コートジボワール	Kōtojibowāru	Cheick Sallah Cissé	Taekwondo	
66	Costa Rica	コスタリカ	Kosutarika	Andrea Vargas	Athletics	
66	Costa Rica	コスタリカ	Kosutarika	Ian Sancho Chinchila	Judo	
67	Kosovo	コソボ	Kosobo	Majlinda Kelmendi	Judo	
67	Kosovo	コソボ	Kosobo	Akil Gjakova	Judo	
68	Comoros	コモロ	Komoro	Amed Elna	Athletics	
68	Comoros	コモロ	Komoro	Fadane Hamadi	Athletics	
69	Colombia	コロンビア	Koronbia	Caterine Ibargüen	Athletics	
69	Colombia	コロンビア	Koronbia	Yuberjen Martínez	Boxing	
70	Congo	コンゴ	Kongo	Natacha Ngoye Akamabi	Athletics	
71	Democratic Republic of the Congo	コンゴ民主共和国	Kongo Minshu Kyōwakoku	Marcelat Sakobi Matshu	Boxing	
71	Democratic Republic of the Congo	コンゴ民主共和国	Kongo Minshu Kyōwakoku	David Tshama Mwenekabwe	Boxing	
72	Saudi Arabia	サウジアラビア	Saujiarabia	Tahani Alqahtani	Judo	
72	Saudi Arabia	サウジアラビア	Saujiarabia	Husein Alireza	Rowing	
73	Samoa	サモア	Samoa	Alex Rose	Athletics	
74	São Tomé and Príncipe	サントメ・プリンシペ	Santome Purinshipe	D'Jamila Tavares	Athletics	
74	São Tomé and Príncipe	サントメ・プリンシペ	Santome Purinshipe	Buly Da Conceição Triste	Canoeing	
75	Zambia	ザンビア	Zanbia	Tilka Paljk	Swimming	
75	Zambia	ザンビア	Zanbia	Everisto Mulenga	Boxing	
76	San Marino	サンマリノ	Sanmarino	Arianna Valloni	Swimming	
76	San Marino	サンマリノ	Sanmarino	Myles Amine	Wrestling	
77	ROC (Note: The delegation used the flag of the Russian Olympic Committee.)	ROC	(Note: ROC was sorted based on a Japanese reading of its French abbreviation COR, シー・オー・アール (Shī Ō Āru). While the English and Japanese parts of the displays both used the official English name "ROC", the delegation was announced with its expanded name Comité olympique russe/Russian Olympic Committee/ロシアオリンピック委員会 Roshia Orinpikku Iinkai.)	Sofya Velikaya	Fencing	
77	ROC	ROC	(Note: ROC was sorted based on a Japanese reading of its French abbreviation COR, シー・オー・アール (Shī Ō Āru). While the English and Japanese parts of the displays both used the official English name "ROC", the delegation was announced with its expanded name Comité olympique russe/Russian Olympic Committee/ロシアオリンピック委員会 Roshia Orinpikku Iinkai.)	Maxim Mikhaylov	Volleyball	
78	Sierra Leone	シエラレオネ	Shierareone	Maggie Barrie	Athletics	
78	Sierra Leone	シエラレオネ	Shierareone	Frederick Harris	Judo	
79	Djibouti	ジブチ	Jibuchi	Aden-Alexandre Houssein	Judo	
80	Jamaica	ジャマイカ	Jamaika	Shelly-Ann Fraser-Pryce	Athletics	
80	Jamaica	ジャマイカ	Jamaika	Ricardo Brown	Boxing	
81	Georgia	ジョージア	Jōjia	Nino Salukvadze	Shooting	
81	Georgia	ジョージア	Jōjia	Lasha Talakhadze	Weightlifting	
82	Syrian Arab Republic	シリア・アラブ共和国	Shiria Arabu Kyōwakoku	Hend Zaza	Table tennis	
82	Syrian Arab Republic	シリア・アラブ共和国	Shiria Arabu Kyōwakoku	Ahmad Hamcho	Equestrian	
83	Singapore	シンガポール	Shingapōru	Yu Mengyu	Table tennis	
83	Singapore	シンガポール	Shingapōru	Loh Kean Yew	Badminton	
84	Zimbabwe	ジンバブエ	Jinbabue	Donata Katai	Swimming	
84	Zimbabwe	ジンバブエ	Jinbabue	Peter Purcell-Gilpin	Rowing	
85	Switzerland	スイス	Suisu	Mujinga Kambundji	Athletics	
85	Switzerland	スイス	Suisu	Max Heinzer	Fencing	
86	Sweden	スウェーデン	Suwēden	Sara Algotsson Ostholt	Equestrian	
86	Sweden	スウェーデン	Suwēden	Max Salminen	Sailing	
87	Sudan	スーダン	Sūdan	Esraa Khogali	Rowing	
87	Sudan	スーダン	Sūdan	Abobakr Abass	Swimming	
88	Spain	スペイン	Supein	Mireia Belmonte	Swimming	
88	Spain	スペイン	Supein	Saúl Craviotto	Canoeing	
89	Suriname	スリナム	Surinamu	Renzo Tjon-A-Joe	Swimming	
90	Sri Lanka	スリランカ	Suriranka	Milka Gehani de Silva	Gymnastics	
90	Sri Lanka	スリランカ	Suriranka	Chamara Dharmawardana	Judo	
91	Slovakia	スロバキア	Surobakia	Zuzana Rehák-Štefečeková	Shooting	
91	Slovakia	スロバキア	Surobakia	Matej Beňuš	Canoeing	
92	Slovenia	スロベニア	Surobenia	Eva Terčelj	Canoeing	
92	Slovenia	スロベニア	Surobenia	Bojan Tokić	Table tennis	
93	Seychelles	セーシェル	Sēsheru	Felicity Passon	Swimming	
93	Seychelles	セーシェル	Sēsheru	Rodney Govinden	Sailing	
94	Equatorial Guinea	赤道ギニア	Sekidō Ginia	Alba Mbo Nchama	Athletics	
94	Equatorial Guinea	赤道ギニア	Sekidō Ginia	Benjamín Enzema	Athletics	
95	Senegal	セネガル	Senegaru	Jeanne Boutbien	Swimming	
95	Senegal	セネガル	Senegaru	Mbagnick Ndiaye	Judo	
96	Serbia	セルビア	Serubia	Sonja Vasić	Basketball	
96	Serbia	セルビア	Serubia	Filip Filipović	Water polo	
97	Saint Kitts and Nevis	セントクリストファー・ネービス	Sentokurisutofā Nēbisu	Amya Clarke	Athletics	
97	Saint Kitts and Nevis	セントクリストファー・ネービス	Sentokurisutofā Nēbisu	Jason Rogers	Athletics	
98	St Vincent and the Grenadines	セントビンセント及びグレナディーン諸島	Sentobinsento Oyobi Gurenadīn Shotō	Shafiqua Maloney	Athletics	
99	Saint Lucia	セントルシア	Sentorushia	Levern Spencer	Athletics	
99	Saint Lucia	セントルシア	Sentorushia	Jean-Luc Zephir	Swimming	
100	Somalia	ソマリア	Somaria	Ramla Ali	Boxing	
100	Somalia	ソマリア	Somaria	Ali Idow Hassan	Athletics	
101	Solomon Islands	ソロモン諸島	Soromon Shotō	Sharon Firisua	Athletics	
101	Solomon Islands	ソロモン諸島	Soromon Shotō	Edgar Iro	Swimming	
102	Thailand	タイ	Tai	Naphaswan Yangpaiboon	Shooting	
102	Thailand	タイ	Tai	Savate Sresthaporn	Shooting	
103	Republic of Korea	大韓民国	Daikanminkoku	Kim Yeon-koung	Volleyball	
103	Republic of Korea	大韓民国	Daikanminkoku	Hwang Sun-woo	Swimming	
104	Chinese Taipei	チャイニーズ・タイペイ	Chainīzu Taipei	Kuo Hsing-chun	Weightlifting	
104	Chinese Taipei	チャイニーズ・タイペイ	Chainīzu Taipei	Lu Yen-hsun	Tennis	
105	Tajikistan	タジキスタン	Tajikisutan	Temur Rakhimov	Judo	
106	United Republic of Tanzania	タンザニア連合共和国	Tanzania Rengō Kyōwakoku	Games Volunteer	N/A	
107	Czech Republic	チェコ共和国	Cheko Kyōwakoku	Petra Kvitová	Tennis	
107	Czech Republic	チェコ共和国	Cheko Kyōwakoku	Tomáš Satoranský	Basketball	
108	Chad	チャド	Chado	Demos Memneloum	Judo	
108	Chad	チャド	Chado	Bachir Mahamat	Athletics	
109	Central African Republic	中央アフリカ共和国	Chūō Afurika Kyōwakoku	Chloé Sauvourel	Swimming	
109	Central African Republic	中央アフリカ共和国	Chūō Afurika Kyōwakoku	Francky Mbotto	Athletics	
110	People's Republic of China	中華人民共和国	Chūka Jinmin Kyōwakoku	Zhu Ting	Volleyball	
110	People's Republic of China	中華人民共和国	Chūka Jinmin Kyōwakoku	Zhao Shuai	Taekwondo	
111	Tunisia	チュニジア	Chunijia	Inès Boubakri	Fencing	
111	Tunisia	チュニジア	Chunijia	Mehdi Ben Cheikh	Volleyball	
112	Chile	チリ	Chiri	Francisca Crovetto	Shooting	
112	Chile	チリ	Chiri	Marco Grimalt	Volleyball	
113	Tuvalu	ツバル	Tsubaru	Matie Stanley	Athletics	
113	Tuvalu	ツバル	Tsubaru	Karalo Maibuca	Athletics	
114	Denmark	デンマーク	Denmāku	Sara Slott Petersen	Athletics	
114	Denmark	デンマーク	Denmāku	Jonas Warrer	Sailing	
115	Germany	ドイツ	Doitsu	Laura Ludwig	Volleyball	
115	Germany	ドイツ	Doitsu	Patrick Hausding	Diving	
116	Togo	トーゴ	Tōgo	Claire Ayivon	Rowing	
116	Togo	トーゴ	Tōgo	Dodji Fanny	Table tennis	
117	Dominica	ドミニカ	Dominika	Thea LaFond	Athletics	
117	Dominica	ドミニカ	Dominika	Dennick Luke	Athletics	
118	Dominican Republic	ドミニカ共和国	Dominika Kyōwakoku	Prisilla Rivera	Volleyball	
118	Dominican Republic	ドミニカ共和国	Dominika Kyōwakoku	Rodrigo Marte	Boxing	
119	Trinidad and Tobago	トリニダード・トバゴ	Torinidādo Tobago	Kelly-Ann Baptiste	Athletics	
120	Turkmenistan	トルクメニスタン	Torukumenisutan	Gulbadam Babamuratova	Judo	
120	Turkmenistan	トルクメニスタン	Torukumenisutan	Merdan Ataýew	Swimming	
121	Turkey	トルコ	Toruko	Merve Tuncel	Swimming	
121	Turkey	トルコ	Toruko	Berke Saka	Swimming	
122	Tonga	トンガ	Tonga	Malia Paseka	Taekwondo	
122	Tonga	トンガ	Tonga	Pita Taufatofua	Taekwondo	
123	Nigeria	ナイジェリア	Naijeria	Odunayo Adekuoroye	Wrestling	
123	Nigeria	ナイジェリア	Naijeria	Quadri Aruna	Table tennis	
124	Nauru	ナウル	Nauru	Nancy Genzel Abouke	Weightlifting	
124	Nauru	ナウル	Nauru	Jonah Harris	Athletics	
125	Namibia	ナミビア	Namibia	Maike Diekmann	Rowing	
125	Namibia	ナミビア	Namibia	Jonas Jonas	Boxing	
126	Nicaragua	ニカラグア	Nikaragua	Sema Ludrick	Weightlifting	
126	Nicaragua	ニカラグア	Nikaragua	Edwin Barberena	Shooting	
127	Niger	ニジェール	Nijēru	Roukaya Mahamane	Swimming	
127	Niger	ニジェール	Nijēru	Abdoul Razak Issoufou	Taekwondo	
128	New Zealand	ニュージーランド	Nyūjīrando	Sarah Hirini	Rugby sevens	
128	New Zealand	ニュージーランド	Nyūjīrando	David Nyika (Note: He replaced Hamish Bond.)	Boxing	
129	Nepal	ネパール	Nepāru	Gaurika Singh	Swimming	
129	Nepal	ネパール	Nepāru	Alexander Shah	Swimming	
130	Norway	ノルウェー	Noruwē	Anne Vilde Tuxen	Diving	
130	Norway	ノルウェー	Noruwē	Tomoe Zenimoto Hvas	Swimming	
131	Bahrain	バーレーン	Bārēn	Noor Yussuf Abdulla	Swimming	
131	Bahrain	バーレーン	Bārēn	Husain Al-Sayyad	Handball	
132	Haiti	ハイチ	Haichi	Sabiana Anestor	Judo	
132	Haiti	ハイチ	Haichi	Darrelle Valsaint	Boxing	
133	Pakistan	パキスタン	Pakisutan	Mahoor Shahzad	Badminton	
133	Pakistan	パキスタン	Pakisutan	Muhammad Khalil Akhtar	Shooting	
134	Panama	パナマ	Panama	Atheyna Bylon	Boxing	
134	Panama	パナマ	Panama	Alonso Edward	Athletics	
135	Vanuatu	バヌアツ	Banuatsu	Rio Rii	Rowing	
136	Bahamas	バハマ	Bahama	Joanna Evans	Swimming	
136	Bahamas	バハマ	Bahama	Donald Thomas	Athletics	
137	Papua New Guinea	パプアニューギニア	Papuanyūginia	Loa Dika Toua	Weightlifting	
137	Papua New Guinea	パプアニューギニア	Papuanyūginia	Morea Baru	Weightlifting	
138	Bermuda	バミューダ	Bamyūda	Dara Alizadeh	Rowing	
139	Palau	パラオ	Parao	Osisang Chilton	Swimming	
139	Palau	パラオ	Parao	Adrian Ililau	Athletics	
140	Paraguay	パラグアイ	Paraguai	Verónica Cepede	Tennis	
140	Paraguay	パラグアイ	Paraguai	Fabrizio Zanotti	Golf	
141	Barbados	バルバドス	Barubadosu	Danielle Titus	Swimming	
141	Barbados	バルバドス	Barubadosu	Alex Sobers	Swimming	
142	Palestine	パレスチナ	Paresuchina	Dania Nour	Swimming	
142	Palestine	パレスチナ	Paresuchina	Mohammed Hamada	Weightlifting	
143	Hungary	ハンガリー	Hangarī	Aida Mohamed	Fencing	
143	Hungary	ハンガリー	Hangarī	László Cseh	Swimming	
144	Bangladesh	バングラデシュ	Banguradeshu	Diya Siddique	Archery	
144	Bangladesh	バングラデシュ	Banguradeshu	Mohammed Ariful Islam	Swimming	
145	Democratic Republic of Timor-Leste	東ティモール民主共和国	Higashi Timōru Minshu Kyōwakoku	Imelda Ximenes	Swimming	
145	Democratic Republic of Timor-Leste	東ティモール民主共和国	Higashi Timōru Minshu Kyōwakoku	Felisberto de Deus	Athletics	
146	Fiji	フィジー	Fijī	Rusila Nagasau	Rugby sevens	
146	Fiji	フィジー	Fijī	Jerry Tuwai	Rugby sevens	
147	Philippines	フィリピン	Firipin	Kiyomi Watanabe	Judo	
147	Philippines	フィリピン	Firipin	Eumir Marcial (Note: EJ Obiena was originally chosen, but he was replaced by men's middleweight boxer Eumir Marcial because of a new protocol that required flagbearers to be in Tokyo 48 hours before the opening ceremony. Obiena was scheduled to arrive on 23 July, the exact day of the opening ceremony.)	Boxing	
148	Finland	フィンランド	Finrando	Satu Mäkelä-Nummela	Shooting	
148	Finland	フィンランド	Finrando	Ari-Pekka Liukkonen	Swimming	
149	Bhutan	ブータン	Būtan	Karma	Archery	
149	Bhutan	ブータン	Būtan	Sangay Tenzin	Swimming	
150	Puerto Rico	プエルトリコ	Puerutoriko	Adriana Díaz	Table tennis	
150	Puerto Rico	プエルトリコ	Puerutoriko	Brian Afanador	Table tennis	
151	Brazil	ブラジル	Burajiru	Ketleyn Quadros	Judo	
151	Brazil	ブラジル	Burajiru	Bruno Rezende	Volleyball	
152	Bulgaria	ブルガリア	Burugaria	Maria Grozdeva	Shooting	
152	Bulgaria	ブルガリア	Burugaria	Josif Miladinov	Swimming	
153	Burkina Faso	ブルキナファソ	Burukinafaso	Angelika Ouedraogo	Swimming	
153	Burkina Faso	ブルキナファソ	Burukinafaso	Hugues Fabrice Zango	Athletics	
154	Brunei Darussalam	ブルネイ・ダルサラーム	Burunei Darusarāmu	Muhammad Isa Ahmad	Swimming	
155	Burundi	ブルンジ	Burunji	Ornella Havyarimana	Boxing	
155	Burundi	ブルンジ	Burunji	Belly-Cresus Ganira	Swimming	
156	American Samoa	米領サモア	Bei-ryō Samoa	Tilali Scanlan	Swimming	
156	American Samoa	米領サモア	Bei-ryō Samoa	Tanumafili Malietoa Jungblut	Weightlifting	
157	Virgin Islands, US	米領バージン諸島	Bei-ryō Bājin Shotō	Natalia Kuipers	Swimming	
157	Virgin Islands, US	米領バージン諸島	Bei-ryō Bājin Shotō	Adriel Sanes	Swimming	
158	Vietnam	ベトナム	Betonamu	Quách Thị Lan	Athletics	
158	Vietnam	ベトナム	Betonamu	Nguyễn Huy Hoàng	Swimming	
159	Benin	ベナン	Benan	Nafissath Radji	Swimming	
159	Benin	ベナン	Benan	Privel Hinkati	Rowing	
160	Venezuela	ベネズエラ	Benezuera	Antonio Díaz (Note: Yulimar Rojas was selected and set to be flag bearer with Díaz, but was not at the opening ceremony. Karen León walked alongside Díaz at the opening ceremony, but did not carry the flag, and Díaz was named as the nation's only opening flagbearer in a later interview.) (Note: These citations does not state, "Karen León walked alongside Díaz at the opening ceremony, but did not carry the flag", "Dias was nominated as the only standard-bearer in the country in a later interview.".)	Karate	
160	Venezuela	ベネズエラ	Benezuera	Karen León	Judo	
161	Belarus	ベラルーシ	Berarūshi	Hanna Marusava	Archery	
161	Belarus	ベラルーシ	Berarūshi	Mikita Tsmyh	Swimming	
162	Belize	ベリーズ	Berīzu	Samantha Dirks	Athletics	
162	Belize	ベリーズ	Berīzu	Shaun Gill	Athletics	
163	Peru	ペルー	Perū	Daniella Rosas	Surfing	
163	Peru	ペルー	Perū	Lucca Mesinas	Surfing	
164	Belgium	ベルギー	Berugī	Nafissatou Thiam	Athletics	
164	Belgium	ベルギー	Berugī	Félix Denayer	Field hockey	
165	Poland	ポーランド	Pōrando	Maja Włoszczowska	Cycling	
165	Poland	ポーランド	Pōrando	Paweł Korzeniowski	Swimming	
166	Bosnia and Herzegovina	ボスニア・ヘルツェゴビナ	Bosunia Herutsegobina	Larisa Cerić	Judo	
166	Bosnia and Herzegovina	ボスニア・ヘルツェゴビナ	Bosunia Herutsegobina	Amel Tuka	Athletics	
167	Botswana	ボツワナ	Botsuwana	Amantle Montsho	Athletics	
167	Botswana	ボツワナ	Botsuwana	Rajab Otukile Mahommed	Boxing	
168	Bolivia	ボリビア	Boribia	Karen Torrez	Swimming	
168	Bolivia	ボリビア	Boribia	Gabriel Castillo	Swimming	
169	Portugal	ポルトガル	Porutogaru	Telma Monteiro	Judo	
169	Portugal	ポルトガル	Porutogaru	Nelson Évora	Athletics	
170	Hong Kong, China	ホンコン・チャイナ	Honkon Chaina	Tse Ying Suet	Badminton	
170	Hong Kong, China	ホンコン・チャイナ	Honkon Chaina	Cheung Ka Long	Fencing	
171	Honduras	ホンジュラス	Honjurasu	Keyla Ávila	Taekwondo	
171	Honduras	ホンジュラス	Honjurasu	Julio Horrego	Swimming	
172	Marshall Islands	マーシャル諸島	Māsharu Shotō	Colleen Furgeson	Swimming	
172	Marshall Islands	マーシャル諸島	Māsharu Shotō	Phillip Kinono	Swimming	
173	Madagascar	マダガスカル	Madagasukaru	Damiella Nomenjanahary	Judo	
173	Madagascar	マダガスカル	Madagasukaru	Éric Andriantsitohaina	Weightlifting	
174	Malawi	マラウイ	Maraui	Jessica Makwenda	Swimming	
174	Malawi	マラウイ	Maraui	Areneo David	Archery	
175	Mali	マリ	Mari	Seydou Fofana	Taekwondo	
176	Malta	マルタ	Maruta	Eleanor Bezzina	Shooting	
176	Malta	マルタ	Maruta	Andrew Chetcuti	Swimming	
177	Malaysia	マレーシア	Marēshia	Goh Liu Ying	Badminton	
177	Malaysia	マレーシア	Marēshia	Lee Zii Jia (Note: Khairul Anuar Mohamad was originally chosen, but requested to be replaced to focus for the archery competition a day after the ceremony.)	Badminton	
178	Federated States of Micronesia	ミクロネシア連邦	Mikuroneshia Renpō	Taeyanna Adams	Swimming	
178	Federated States of Micronesia	ミクロネシア連邦	Mikuroneshia Renpō	Scott Fiti	Athletics	
179	South Africa	南アフリカ	Minami Afurika	Phumelela Mbande	Field hockey	
179	South Africa	南アフリカ	Minami Afurika	Chad le Clos	Swimming	
180	South Sudan	南スーダン	Minami Sūdan	Lucia Moris	Athletics	
180	South Sudan	南スーダン	Minami Sūdan	Abraham Guem	Athletics	
181	Myanmar	ミャンマー	Myanmā	Games Volunteer	N/A	
182	Mexico	メキシコ	Mekishiko	Gabriela López	Golf	
182	Mexico	メキシコ	Mekishiko	Rommel Pacheco	Diving	
183	Mauritius	モーリシャス	Mōrishasu	Roilya Ranaivosoa	Weightlifting	
183	Mauritius	モーリシャス	Mōrishasu	Richarno Colin	Boxing	
184	Mauritania	モーリタニア	Mōritania	Houlèye Ba	Athletics	
184	Mauritania	モーリタニア	Mōritania	Abidine Abidine	Athletics	
185	Mozambique	モザンビーク	Mozanbīku	Rady Adosinda Gramane	Boxing	
185	Mozambique	モザンビーク	Mozanbīku	Kevin Loforte	Judo	
186	Monaco	モナコ	Monako	Quentin Antognelli	Rowing	
186	Monaco	モナコ	Monako	Yang Xiaoxin	Table tennis	
187	Maldives	モルディブ	Morudibu	Fathimath Nabaaha Abdul Razzaq	Badminton	
187	Maldives	モルディブ	Morudibu	Mubal Azzam Ibrahim	Swimming	
188	Republic of Moldova	モルドバ共和国	Morudoba Kyōwakoku	Alexandra Mîrca	Archery	
188	Republic of Moldova	モルドバ共和国	Morudoba Kyōwakoku	Dan Olaru	Archery	
189	Morocco	モロッコ	Morokko	Oumaïma Belahbib	Boxing	
189	Morocco	モロッコ	Morokko	Ramzi Boukhiam	Surfing	
190	Mongolia	モンゴル	Mongoru	Onolbaataryn Khulan	Basketball	
190	Mongolia	モンゴル	Mongoru	Duurenbayar Ulziibayar	Judo	
191	Montenegro	モンテネグロ	Monteneguro	Jovanka Radičević	Handball	
191	Montenegro	モンテネグロ	Monteneguro	Draško Brguljan	Water polo	
192	Jordan	ヨルダン	Yorudan	Julyana Al-Sadeq	Taekwondo	
192	Jordan	ヨルダン	Yorudan	Zeyad Ishaish	Boxing	
193	Lao People's Democratic Republic	ラオス人民民主共和国	Raosu Jinmin Minshu Kyōwakoku	Silina Pha Aphay	Athletics	
193	Lao People's Democratic Republic	ラオス人民民主共和国	Raosu Jinmin Minshu Kyōwakoku	Santisouk Inthavong	Swimming	
194	Latvia	ラトビア	Ratobia	Jeļena Ostapenko	Tennis	
194	Latvia	ラトビア	Ratobia	Agnis Čavars	Basketball	
195	Lithuania	リトアニア	Ritoania	Sandra Jablonskytė	Judo	
195	Lithuania	リトアニア	Ritoania	Giedrius Titenis	Swimming	
196	Libya	リビア	Ribia	Al-Hussein Gambour	Rowing	
197	Liechtenstein	リヒテンシュタイン	Rihitenshutain	Julia Hassler	Swimming	
197	Liechtenstein	リヒテンシュタイン	Rihitenshutain	Raphael Schwendinger	Judo	
198	Liberia	リベリア	Riberia	Ebony Morrison	Athletics	
198	Liberia	リベリア	Riberia	Joseph Fahnbulleh	Athletics	
199	Romania	ルーマニア	Rūmania	Simona Radiș (Note: Simona Halep was originally chosen, but had to withdraw due to injury.) (Note: Mădălina Bereș was chosen to replace Halep, but passed the opportunity to her partner in the doubles.)	Rowing	
199	Romania	ルーマニア	Rūmania	Robert Glință	Swimming	
200	Luxembourg	ルクセンブルク	Rukusenburuku	Christine Majerus	Cycling	
200	Luxembourg	ルクセンブルク	Rukusenburuku	Raphaël Stacchiotti	Swimming	
201	Rwanda	ルワンダ	Ruwanda	Alphonsine Agahozo	Swimming	
201	Rwanda	ルワンダ	Ruwanda	John Hakizimana	Athletics	
202	Lesotho	レソト	Resoto	Games Volunteer	N/A	
203	Lebanon	レバノン	Rebanon	Ray Bassil	Shooting	
203	Lebanon	レバノン	Rebanon	Nacif Elias	Judo	
204	United States	アメリカ合衆国	Amerika Gasshūkoku	Sue Bird	Basketball	
204	United States	アメリカ合衆国	Amerika Gasshūkoku	Eddy Alvarez	Baseball	
205	France	フランス	Furansu	Clarisse Agbegnenou	Judo	
205	France	フランス	Furansu	Samir Aït Saïd	Gymnastics	
206	Japan	日本	Nihon	Yui Susaki	Wrestling	
206	Japan	日本	Nihon	Rui Hachimura	Basketball	

=== Taiwan (Chinese Taipei)'s parade entrance ===
Multiple Taiwanese media outlets, as well as Japanese lawmaker Akihisa Nagashima, reported that the Taiwan (Chinese Taipei) delegation had been specially ordered within the parade so that they would march under タ ta for either "Taiwan" or ambiguously "Chinese Taipei" rather than チ chi or チャイ chai for "Chinese Taipei". However, it would have done this regardless of special ordering, as Chinese Taipei has paraded under "T" or its equivalent in every Parade of Nations language other than Chinese (including, for example, PyeongChang 2018 and Seoul 1988).

NHK, the opening ceremony's official Japanese broadcaster, also specially commented "It's Taiwan!" (台湾です！ Taiwan desu!) after the stadium announcers finished announcing the name "Chinese Taipei", which also received attention from Taiwanese media.

== Music ==
Musical pieces for the Parade of Nations were selected from several video game soundtracks created in Japan. These selections included themes from Square Enix's Dragon Quest, Final Fantasy, SaGa, Nier, and Chrono Trigger, Disney's Kingdom Hearts, Bandai Namco's Tales series, Soulcalibur, and Ace Combat, Capcom's Monster Hunter, Konami's Pro Evolution Soccer and Gradius, and Sega Sammy's Sonic the Hedgehog and Phantasy Star.

== See also ==
- 2020 Summer Paralympics Parade of Nations
- 1964 Summer Olympics Parade of Nations, also in Tokyo, Japan.
- 1998 Winter Olympics Parade of Nations

Preceded by Rio de Janeiro	Summer Olympics Parade of Nations; Tokyo; XXXII Olympics Summer Games (2020)	Succeeded by Paris
