= Cambodia at the Olympics =

- Flag of Cambodia
- IOC code: CAM
- NOC: National Olympic Committee of Cambodia
- Website: www.noccambodia.org (in Khmer and English)
- Medals: Gold 0 Silver 0 Bronze 0 Total 0

Summer appearances
- 1956; 1960; 1964; 1968; 1972; 1976–1992; 1996; 2000; 2004; 2008; 2012; 2016; 2020; 2024

Cambodia has competed in 11 Summer Olympic Games. They have never won an Olympic medal and have not appeared in the Winter Olympic Games.

Cambodia first competed in the 1956 Summer Olympics which were held in Melbourne, Australia, but physically competed only in Stockholm, Sweden, as Cambodia only participated in the equestrian events which took place in Sweden due to quarantine regulations and boycotted events in Melbourne over opposition to the Suez Crisis.

Cambodia did not compete in the Olympics for a 24-year period following the 1972 Summer Olympics due to the activities of the Khmer Rouge regime, finally returning for the 1996 Summer Olympics. They have competed in every Summer Olympic Games since.

== Medal tables ==
=== Medals by Summer Games ===
Games	Athletes	Gold	Silver	Bronze	Total	Rank
1956 Melbourne	2	0	0	0	0	–
1960 Rome	did not participate					
1964 Tokyo	11	0	0	0	0	–
1968 Mexico City	did not participate					
1972 Munich	10	0	0	0	0	–
1976–1992	did not participate					
1996 Atlanta	5	0	0	0	0	–
2000 Sydney	4	0	0	0	0	–
2004 Athens	4	0	0	0	0	–
2008 Beijing	4	0	0	0	0	–
2012 London	6	0	0	0	0	–
2016 Rio de Janeiro	6	0	0	0	0	–
2020 Tokyo	3	0	0	0	0	–
2024 Paris	3	0	0	0	0	–
2028 Los Angeles	future event					
2032 Brisbane	future event					
Total		0	0	0	0	–

== See also ==
- List of flag bearers for Cambodia at the Olympics
- Cambodia at the Paralympics
- Sport in Cambodia
