= Cambodia at the 2008 Summer Olympics =

- Flag of Cambodia
- IOC code: CAM
- NOC: National Olympic Committee of Cambodia
- Website: www.noccambodia.org (in Khmer and English)

in Beijing
- Competitors: 4 in 2 sports
- Flag bearer: Hem Bunting
- Medals: Gold 0 Silver 0 Bronze 0 Total 0

Summer Olympics appearances (overview)
- 1956; 1960; 1964; 1968; 1972; 1976–1992; 1996; 2000; 2004; 2008; 2012; 2016; 2020; 2024

Cambodia competed in the 2008 Summer Olympics, held in Beijing, People's Republic of China from August 8 to August 24, 2008. The country sent a total of four competitors to the Games.

== Athletics ==
Key

- Note–Ranks given for track events are within the athlete's heat only
- Q = Qualified for the next round
- q = Qualified for the next round as a fastest loser or, in field events, by position without achieving the qualifying target
- NR = National record
- N/A = Round not applicable for the event
- Bye = Athlete not required to compete in round

Men

Athlete	Event	Final	
Athlete	Event	Result	Rank
Hem Bunting	Marathon	2:33:32	73

Women

Athlete	Event	Heat		Quarterfinal		Semifinal		Final	
Athlete	Event	Result	Rank	Result	Rank	Result	Rank	Result	Rank
Titlinda Sou	100 m	12.98	7	did not advance					

== Swimming ==
Men

Athlete	Event	Heat		Semifinal		Final	
Athlete	Event	Time	Rank	Time	Rank	Time	Rank
Hemthon Ponloeu	50 m freestyle	27.39	79	did not advance			

Women

Athlete	Event	Heat		Semifinal		Final	
Athlete	Event	Time	Rank	Time	Rank	Time	Rank
Hemthon Vitiny	50 m freestyle	31.41	78	did not advance			

== See also ==
- Cambodia at the 2008 Summer Paralympics
