= Brandon Sakbun =

American politician

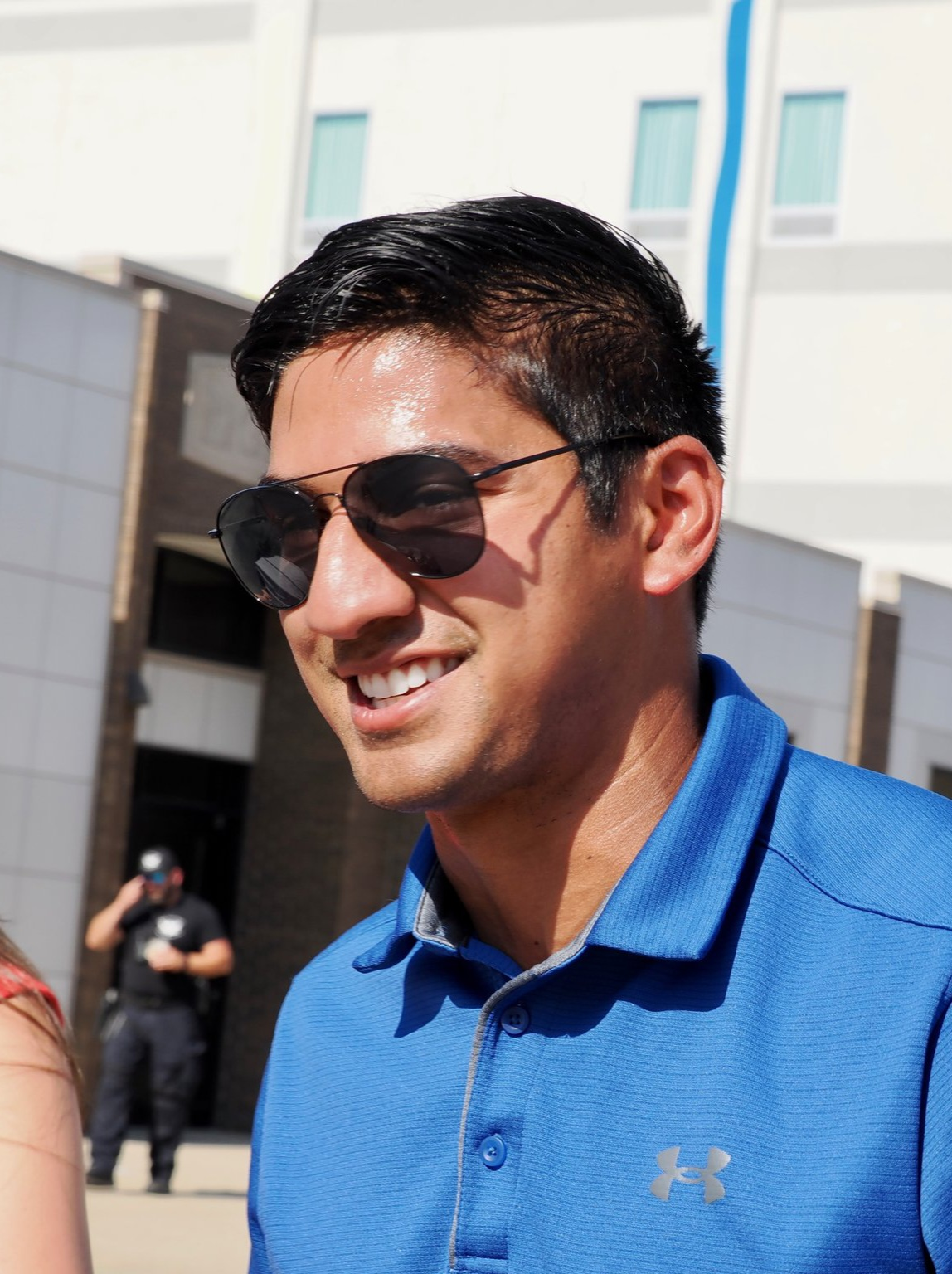
- Sakbun in 2025

43rd Mayor of Terre Haute
- Incumbent
- Assumed office January 2024
- Preceded by: Duke Bennett

Personal details
- Born: March 4, 1996 (age 30) Terre Haute, Indiana, U.S.
- Party: Democratic
- Relatives: Apsara Sakbun (sister)
- Education: Indiana University Bloomington (BA, MPA)

Brandon Sakbun (born March 4, 1996) is an American politician and former United States Army captain, currently serving as the mayor of Terre Haute, Indiana.

== Early life and education ==
Sakbun was born in 1996 in Terre Haute, Indiana to Dr. Vannara Sakbun and Mrs. Carlene Sakbun. One of his parents is an immigrant from Cambodia and the other is an immigrant from Jamaica. Sakbun attended Terre Haute South Vigo High School. After graduating from high school, he attended Indiana University Bloomington where he received a bachelor's degree in finance at the Kelley School of Business and a master's degree in public affairs at the O'Neill School of Public and Environmental Affairs.

Sakbun has two sisters, one of which, Apsara, represented Cambodia in swimming in the 2024 Summer Olympics.

== Army career ==
While in college, Sakbun was in the Army Reserve Officers' Training Corps and was commissioned as a Second Lieutenant upon graduation in 2018. He was in the army for 5 years, rising to the rank of Captain. He also served on several strike teams with the 75th Ranger Regiment. Shortly prior to becoming mayor, Sakbun transitioned to the Indiana National Guard.

== Mayoral candidacy ==
On January 31, 2023, Sakbun announced his candidacy for mayor of Terre Haute, Indiana, running as a Democrat. The incumbent mayor was Republican Duke Bennett, who had been in office since 2008 and was running for a fifth term in office. Sakbun ran a campaign based on expanding and improving infrastructure and improving educational and job opportunities in the city. He was notable for his "inexhaustible energy" displayed while campaigning.

=== Election ===
2023 Terre Haute mayoral election
- November 2023
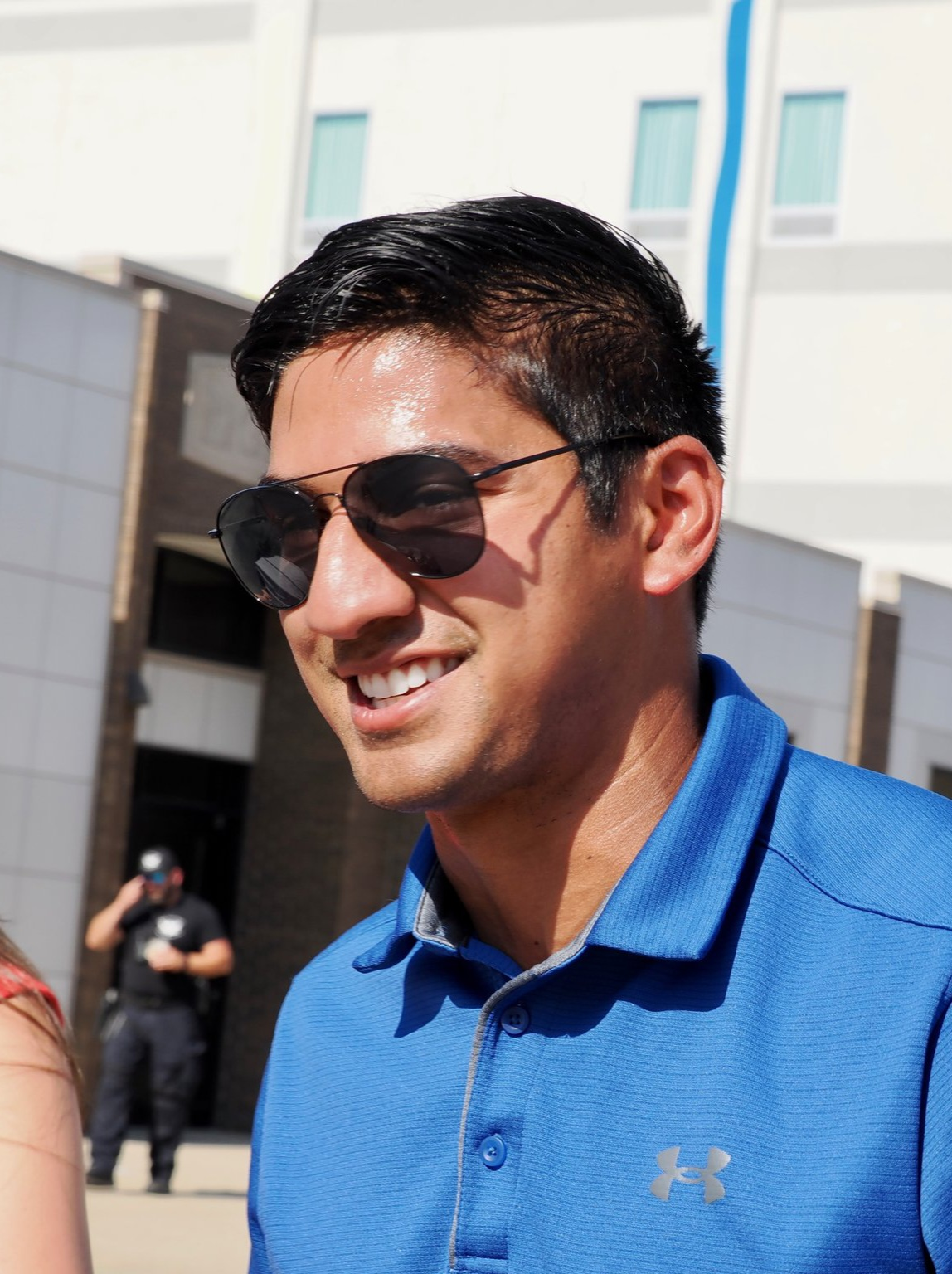
Nominee	Brandon Sakbun	Duke Bennett
Party	Democratic	Republican
Popular vote	5,666	3,806
Percentage	59.9%	40.1%
Mayor before election
Duke Bennett
Elected mayor
Brandon Sakbun

==== Candidates ====
===== Democratic =====
- Brandon Sakbun, member of the Indiana National Guard and former Army Captain
- Pat Goodwin, engineer

===== Republican =====
- Duke Bennett, incumbent mayor (2008-2023)

==== Democratic primary ====
In the Democratic primary, Sakbun defeated Goodwin by a margin of 54%-46%.

Democratic primary results
Party	Candidate	Votes	%
Democratic	Brandon Sakbun	2,414	56.2%
Democratic	Pat Goodwin	2,034	45.8%
Total votes		4,448	100.00%

==== Republican primary ====
Incumbent mayor Bennett was nominated without opposition.

==== General election ====
In the general election, Sakbun defeated Bennett by a margin of 60%-40%, making him the youngest mayor in Terre Haute history.

General election result
Party	Candidate	Votes	%
Democratic	Brandon Sakbun	5,666	59.9%
Republican	Duke Bennett (incumbent)	3,806	40.1%
Total votes		9,472	100.00%
Democratic gain from Republican			

== Mayoral tenure ==
Sakbun was sworn into office in January 2024.

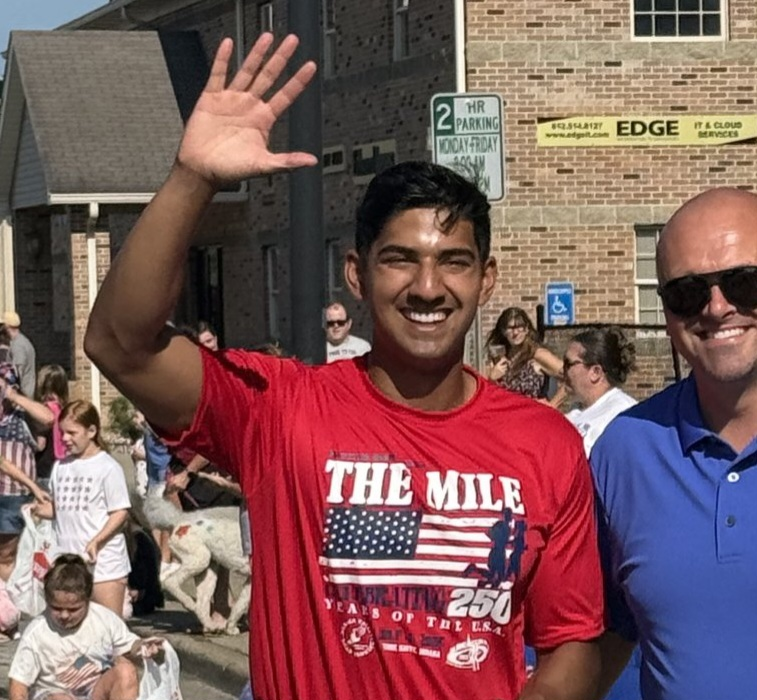
Sakbun at an Independence Day parade

In Sakbun's first year, he improved city infrastructure, increased the housing stock for the city, rebuilt parks, and invested in public safety. He became well known for his bipartisan pragmatic approach to government.

Sakbun focused on blight elimination and increasing housing developments to help address the rising cost of housing in Terre Haute. Through the Homes for the Future Program, housing construction increased throughout the city.
