= List of mayors of Terre Haute, Indiana =

This is a list of mayors of Terre Haute, Indiana.

== Town of Terre Haute ==
#	Name	Term start	Term end	Party
1	Elijah Tillotson (1791–1857; aged 66)	1838	1838	
2	Dr. Marcus Hitchcock (1781–1848; aged 66)	1838	1839	
3	Britton M. Harrison	June 1839	1843	

"On Feb. 9, 1843, the office of Mayor was abolished by a special act of the Legislature in 1843, the president of the common council administered mayoral duties until the city was incorporated in 1853. Under the new constitution of the State of Indiana, a General Law was approved on June 18, 1852, providing for the incorporation of cities."

== City of Terre Haute ==
#	Name	Term start	Term end	Party
4	William Kirkpatrick Edwards (1820–1878; aged 57)	June 1853	May 1855	Whig
5	James Hook (1815–1895; aged 80)	1855	1856	
6	Chambers Y. Patterson (1824–1881; aged 56–57)	1856	1860	Democratic
7	William H. Stewart	1861	1863	
8	Albert Lange (1801–1869; aged 67–68)	1863	1867	Republican
9	Grafton Fleener Cookerly (1815–1885; aged 70)	1867	1871	Democratic
10	Alexander Thomas	1871	1875	
11	James B. Edmunds	1875	1877	
12	Henry Fairbanks	1877	1878	
13	Joseph M. Wildy	1878	1879	Democratic
14	Benjamin F. Havens (1839–1914; aged 75)	1879	1881	
15	James B. Lyne	1881	1883	
16	William H. Armstrong	1883	1885	
17	Jacob C. Kolsem	1885	1889	Republican
18	Frank C. Donaldson	1889	1891	Republican
19	James M. Allen	1891	1892	
20	Henry M. Griswold	1892	1892	Republican
21	Frederick A. Ross	1892	1898	
22	Henry C. Steeg	1898	1904	Democratic
23	Edwin H. Bidaman	1904	July 6, 1906	Republican
24	Frank M. Buckingham	July 7, 1906	1906	Republican
25	James Lyons	1906	1910	Democratic
26	Louis A. Gerhardt	1910	1914	
27	Donn M. Roberts (1867–1936; aged 68)	1914	May 1915	Democratic
28	James Murrell Gossom	1915	1917	Democratic
29	Charles S. Hunter	1918	1922	Republican
30	Ora D. Davis	1922	1930	Republican
31	Wood J. Posey	1930	1935	
32	Samuel E. Beecher Sr. (1893–1973; aged 80)	1935	1939	
33	Joseph P. Duffy	1939	1943	
34	Vernon R. McMillan (1892–1968; aged 76)	1943	1947	Republican
35	Ralph Tucker (1906–1977; aged 71)	January 1, 1948	1967	Democratic
36	Leland Larrison (1907–1992; aged 85)	1968	1972	Republican
37	William J. Brighton (1929–1992; aged 63)	1972	1979	Democratic
38	P. Pete Chalos (1927–2006; aged 78)	1980	1996	Democratic
39	Jim Jenkins	1996	1999	Democratic
40	Judy A. Anderson (born in 1941; age 83–84)	2000	2003	Democratic
41	Kevin D. Burke	2004	2008	Democratic
42	Duke Bennett	January 2008	2024	Republican
43	Brandon Sakbun	January 2024	Present	Democratic

== See also ==
- Terre Haute, Indiana
