= Cambodia at the 1972 Summer Olympics =

- Flag of the Khmer Republic
- IOC code: CAM (KHM used at these Games)
- NOC: National Olympic Committee of Cambodia

in Munich
- Flag bearer: Chaing Cheng
- Medals: Gold 0 Silver 0 Bronze 0 Total 0

Summer Olympics appearances (overview)
- 1956; 1960; 1964; 1968; 1972; 1976–1992; 1996; 2000; 2004; 2008; 2012; 2016; 2020; 2024

Cambodia competed at the 1972 Summer Olympics in Munich, West Germany. The nation returned to the Olympic Games as the Khmer Republic (1970–1975) after missing the 1968 Summer Olympics. Owing to the troubled situation of the country caused by Khmer Rouge, Cambodia would not compete again until the 1996 Summer Olympics.

== Athletics ==
Men

Athlete	Event	Heat		Quarterfinal		Semifinal		Final	
Athlete	Event	Result	Rank	Result	Rank	Result	Rank	Result	Rank
Samphon Mao	100 m	10.95	7	did not advance					
Savin Chem	400 m	48.82	7	did not advance					

Field events

Athlete	Event	Qualification		Final	
Athlete	Event	Distance	Position	Distance	Position
Sitha Sin	High jump	1.90	36T	did not advance	

Women

Athlete	Event	Heat		Quarterfinal		Semifinal		Final	
Athlete	Event	Result	Rank	Result	Rank	Result	Rank	Result	Rank
Meas Kheng	100 m	12.72	8	did not advance					
Meas Kheng	200 m	25.86	7	did not advance					

== Boxing ==
Men

Athlete	Event	1 Round	2 Round	3 Round	Quarterfinals	Semifinals	Final	
Athlete	Event	Opposition Result	Opposition Result	Opposition Result	Opposition Result	Opposition Result	Opposition Result	Rank
Soth Sun	Featherweight	BYE	Kinyogoli (TAN); L 0-5	did not advance				
Phar Khong	Flyweight	Schubert (FRG); Walk-Over	did not advance					

== Swimming ==
Men

Athlete	Event	Heat		Semifinal		Final	
Athlete	Event	Time	Rank	Time	Rank	Time	Rank
Samnang Prak	100 metre freestyle	59.18	6	did not advance			
Samnang Prak	200 metre freestyle	2:13.34	6	did not advance			
Sarun Van	100 metre backstroke	1:07.26	7	did not advance			
Sarun Van	200 metre backstroke	2:24.42	5	did not advance			
Sokhon Yi	100 metre breaststroke	1:11.00	5	did not advance			
Sokhon Yi	200 metre breaststroke	2:34.77	5	did not advance			
Chhay-Kheng Nhem	100 metre butterfly	1:05.12	7	did not advance			
Sarun Van; Sokhon Yi; Chhay-Kheng Nhem; Samnang Prak	4 × 100 metre medley relay	4:20.71	6	—N/a		did not advance	

== Sources ==
- Official Olympic Reports
