= Donn M. Roberts =

American politician (1867–1936)

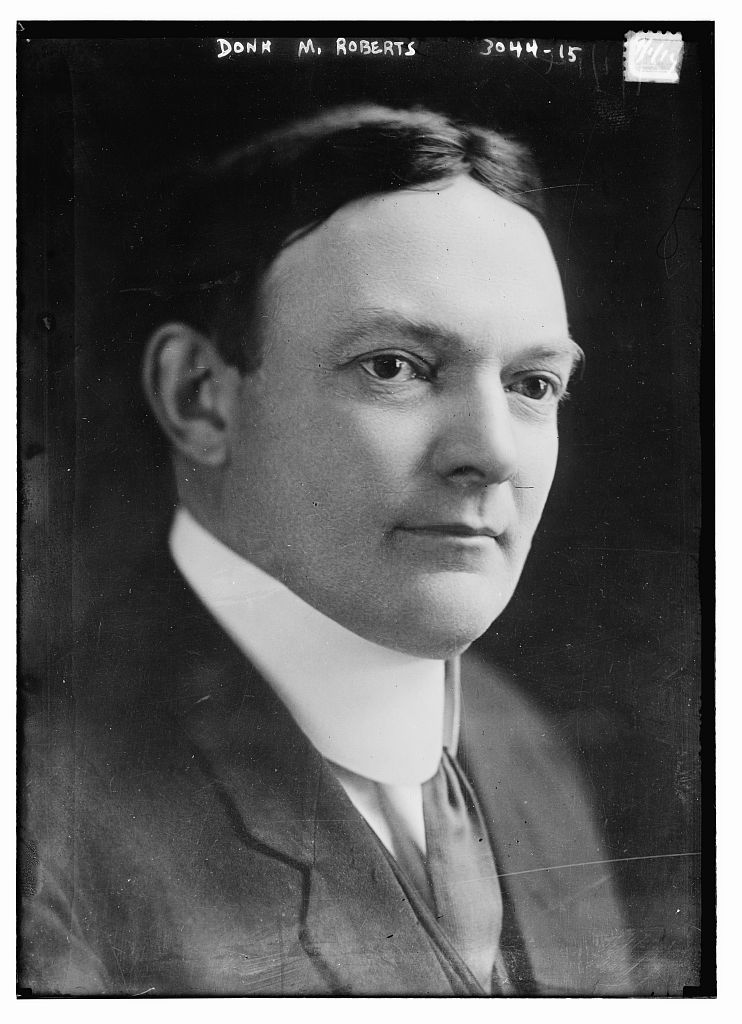

Donn M. Roberts (September 28, 1867 – August 3, 1936) was the mayor of Terre Haute, Indiana from 1913 to 1915.

== Biography ==
He was born in Annapolis, Illinois to William Henry Roberts and Octavia Bruner. On July 3, 1889, in Indianapolis, Indiana he married Mary Grace Tiernan.

He was the Democratic mayor of Terre Haute, Indiana from 1913 to 1915. He was convicted of bribery in 1915 and spent three and a half years in Leavenworth prison of his six-year sentence.

He was buried in St. Joseph's Cemetery.

== See also ==
- List of mayors of Terre Haute, Indiana

Political offices
Preceded by Louis A. Gerhardt	Mayor of Terre Haute, Indiana; 1913 – 1915	Succeeded by James G. Gossom
