= Swimming at the 2020 Summer Olympics – Women's 50 metre freestyle =

Women's 50 metre freestyle at the Games of the XXXII Olympiad
- Venue: Tokyo Aquatics Centre
- Dates: 30 July 2021 (heats); 31 July 2021 (semifinals); 1 August 2021 (final)
- Competitors: 81 from 73 nations
- Winning time: 23.81 OR

Medalists
1st place, gold medalist(s)		Emma McKeon	Australia
2nd place, silver medalist(s)		Sarah Sjöström	Sweden
3rd place, bronze medalist(s)		Pernille Blume	Denmark

The women's 50 metre freestyle event at the 2020 Summer Olympics was held from 30 July to 1 August 2021 at the Olympic Aquatics Centre. It was the event's ninth consecutive appearance, having been held at every edition since 1988.

== Summary ==
Australia's Emma McKeon surged in the last 15 m of the race to win gold in an Olympic record time of 23.81, having also bettered the mark in the heats and semi-final. With her sixth medal at these Games, McKeon became the most decorated Australian Olympian at a single Games.

Following elbow surgery in February, Sweden's Sarah Sjöström achieved her first podium finish at these Games with the world-record holder clocking a 24.07 to win silver. The defending Olympic champion Pernille Blume (24.21) won the bronze medal, denying the 2012 Olympic champion Ranomi Kromowidjojo (24.30) a podium finish.

Poland's Katarzyna Wasick and China's Wu Qingfeng came equal fifth in 24.32, while Australia's Cate Campbell (24.36) and the U.S.'s Abbey Weitzeil (24.41) rounded out the championship field.

== Records ==
Prior to this competition, the existing world and Olympic records were as follows.

World record	Sarah Sjöström (SWE)	23.67	Budapest, Hungary	29 July 2017
Olympic record	Ranomi Kromowidjojo (NED)	24.05	London, United Kingdom	4 August 2012

The following records were established during the competition:

Date	Event	Swimmer	Nation	Time	Record
30 July	Heat 10	Emma McKeon	Australia	24.02	OR
31 July	Semifinal 2	Emma McKeon	Australia	24.00	OR
1 August	Final	Emma McKeon	Australia	23.81	OR

== Qualification ==
The Olympic Qualifying Time for the event is 24.77 seconds. Up to two swimmers per National Olympic Committee (NOC) can automatically qualify by swimming that time at an approved qualification event. The Olympic Selection Time is 25.51 seconds. Up to one swimmer per NOC meeting that time is eligible for selection, allocated by world ranking until the maximum quota for all swimming events is reached. NOCs without a female swimmer qualified in any event can also use their universality place.

== Competition format ==
The competition consists of three rounds: heats, semifinals, and a final. The swimmers with the best 16 times in the heats advance to the semifinals. The swimmers with the best 8 times in the semifinals advance to the final. Swim-offs are used as necessary to break ties for advancement to the next round.

== Schedule ==
All times are Japan Standard Time (UTC+9)

Date	Time	Round
30 July	19:23	Heats
31 July	11:32	Semifinals
1 August	10:37	Final

== Results ==
=== Heats ===
The swimmers with the top 16 times, regardless of heat, advanced to the semifinals.

Rank	Heat	Lane	Swimmer	Nation	Time	Notes
1	10	4	Emma McKeon	Australia	24.02	Q, OR
2	9	5	Pernille Blume	Denmark	24.12	Q
3	9	4	Cate Campbell	Australia	24.15	Q
4	11	4	Sarah Sjöström	Sweden	24.26	Q
5	11	3	Katarzyna Wasick	Poland	24.31	Q
6	9	6	Zhang Yufei	China	24.36	Q
7	11	6	Abbey Weitzeil	United States	24.37	Q
8	11	5	Ranomi Kromowidjojo	Netherlands	24.41	Q
9	11	7	Arina Surkova	ROC	24.52	Q
10	9	2	Wu Qingfeng	China	24.55	Q
11	10	5	Simone Manuel	United States	24.65	Q
11	10	8	Emma Chelius	South Africa	24.65	Q, NR
13	10	2	Mélanie Henique	France	24.69	Q
14	11	8	Julie Kepp Jensen	Denmark	24.70	Q
15	11	1	Siobhán Haughey	Hong Kong	24.75	Q, WD
16	10	6	Femke Heemskerk	Netherlands	24.77	Q, WD
17	9	8	Fanny Teijonsalo	Finland	24.79	Q
18	9	7	Marie Wattel	France	24.82	Q
19	10	3	Maria Kameneva	ROC	24.83	
20	9	3	Michelle Coleman	Sweden	24.84	
21	10	1	Barbora Seemanová	Czech Republic	24.92	
22	9	1	Kayla Sanchez	Canada	24.93	
23	8	5	Lidón Muñoz del Campo	Spain	25.10	
24	8	6	Farida Osman	Egypt	25.13	
25	6	4	Anicka Delgado	Ecuador	25.36	NR
25	8	4	Julie Meynen	Luxembourg	25.36	
27	7	3	Isabella Arcila	Colombia	25.41	
27	8	1	Kalia Antoniou	Cyprus	25.41	
29	10	7	Etiene Medeiros	Brazil	25.45	
30	8	2	Andrea Murez	Israel	25.48	
31	7	4	Bianca-Andreea Costea	Romania	25.61	
32	7	2	Jeserik Pinto	Venezuela	25.65	
33	8	7	Danielle Hill	Ireland	25.70	
34	6	1	Elinah Phillip	British Virgin Islands	25.74	
35	7	5	Amel Melih	Algeria	25.77	
35	7	7	Karen Torrez	Bolivia	25.77	
37	8	8	Jenjira Srisa-Ard	Thailand	25.97	
38	7	1	Huang Mei-chien	Chinese Taipei	25.99	
39	7	8	Allyson Ponson	Aruba	26.03	
40	8	3	Quah Ting Wen	Singapore	26.16	
41	7	6	Cherelle Thompson	Trinidad and Tobago	26.19	
42	6	7	Nikol Merizaj	Albania	26.21	NR
43	6	6	Emily Muteti	Kenya	26.31	
44	5	4	Norah Milanesi	Cameroon	26.41	
45	6	3	Talita Baqlah	Jordan	26.49	
45	6	5	Ema Rajić	Croatia	26.49	
47	6	8	Kirabo Namutebi	Uganda	26.63	
48	6	2	Natalya Kritinina	Uzbekistan	26.93	
49	5	5	Mikaili Charlemagne	Saint Lucia	26.99	
50	5	7	Cheyenne Rova	Fiji	27.11	
51	5	1	Batbayaryn Enkhkhüslen	Mongolia	27.29	NR
52	5	6	Tilka Paljk	Zambia	27.34	
53	4	5	Judith Meauri	Papua New Guinea	27.56	
54	5	3	Samantha Roberts	Antigua and Barbuda	27.63	
55	4	4	Aleka Persaud	Guyana	27.76	NR
56	5	8	Bisma Khan	Pakistan	27.78	NR
57	5	2	Unilez Takyi	Ghana	27.85	
58	4	1	Angelika Ouedraogo	Burkina Faso	28.38	NR
59	4	6	Mya De Freitas	Saint Vincent and the Grenadines	28.57	
60	4	7	Noor Yussuf Abdulla	Bahrain	28.87	
61	4	8	Jessica Makwenda	Malawi	28.96	
62	3	4	Anastasiya Tyurina	Tajikistan	29.05	
63	4	3	Noelani Day	Tonga	29.06	
64	3	8	Siri Arun Budcharern	Laos	29.22	
65	3	5	Bunpichmorakat Kheun	Cambodia	29.42	
66	4	2	Alicia Mateus	Mozambique	29.63	
67	3	2	Lara Dashti	Kuwait	29.69	
68	3	1	Junayna Ahmed	Bangladesh	29.78	NR
69	3	6	Nafissath Radji	Benin	29.99	
70	3	3	Robyn Young	Eswatini	30.41	
71	3	7	Dania Nour	Palestine	30.43	
72	2	1	Alphonsine Agahozo	Rwanda	30.50	
73	2	2	Osisang Chilton	Palau	30.67	
74	2	4	Tity Dumbuya	Sierra Leone	31.56	
75	2	6	Chloe Sauvourel	Central African Republic	32.18	
76	2	3	Roukaya Mahamane	Niger	32.21	
77	2	7	Aya Mpali	Gabon	32.24	
78	1	4	Imelda Ximenes Belo	Timor-Leste	32.89	
79	1	3	Odrina Kaze	Burundi	33.39	
80	1	5	Haneen Ibrahim	Sudan	34.49	
81	2	8	Bellore Sangala	Republic of the Congo	37.92	
	2	5	Nada Arkaji	Qatar	DNS	
	11	2	Anna Hopkin	Great Britain	DNS	

=== Semifinals ===
The swimmers with the best 8 times, regardless of heat, advanced to the final.

Rank	Heat	Lane	Swimmer	Nation	Time	Notes
1	2	4	Emma McKeon	Australia	24.00	Q, OR
2	1	4	Pernille Blume	Denmark	24.08	Q
3	1	5	Sarah Sjöström	Sweden	24.13	Q
4	2	6	Abbey Weitzeil	United States	24.19	Q
5	2	3	Katarzyna Wasick	Poland	24.26	Q
6	2	5	Cate Campbell	Australia	24.27	Q
7	1	6	Ranomi Kromowidjojo	Netherlands	24.29	Q
8	1	2	Wu Qingfeng	China	24.32	QSO
8	1	3	Zhang Yufei	China	24.32	QSO, WD
10	2	2	Arina Surkova	ROC	24.57	
11	2	1	Mélanie Henique	France	24.63	
11	2	7	Simone Manuel	United States	24.63	
13	1	7	Emma Chelius	South Africa	24.64	NR
14	1	8	Marie Wattel	France	24.76	
15	2	8	Fanny Teijonsalo	Finland	24.91	
16	1	1	Julie Kepp Jensen	Denmark	24.98	

=== Final ===
Rank	Lane	Swimmer	Nation	Time	Notes
1st place, gold medalist(s)	4	Emma McKeon	Australia	23.81	OR
2nd place, silver medalist(s)	3	Sarah Sjöström	Sweden	24.07	
3rd place, bronze medalist(s)	5	Pernille Blume	Denmark	24.21	
4	1	Ranomi Kromowidjojo	Netherlands	24.30	
5	2	Katarzyna Wasick	Poland	24.32	
5	8	Wu Qingfeng	China	24.32	
7	7	Cate Campbell	Australia	24.36	
8	6	Abbey Weitzeil	United States	24.41	
