= Sorn Davin =

Cambodian taekwondo practitioner

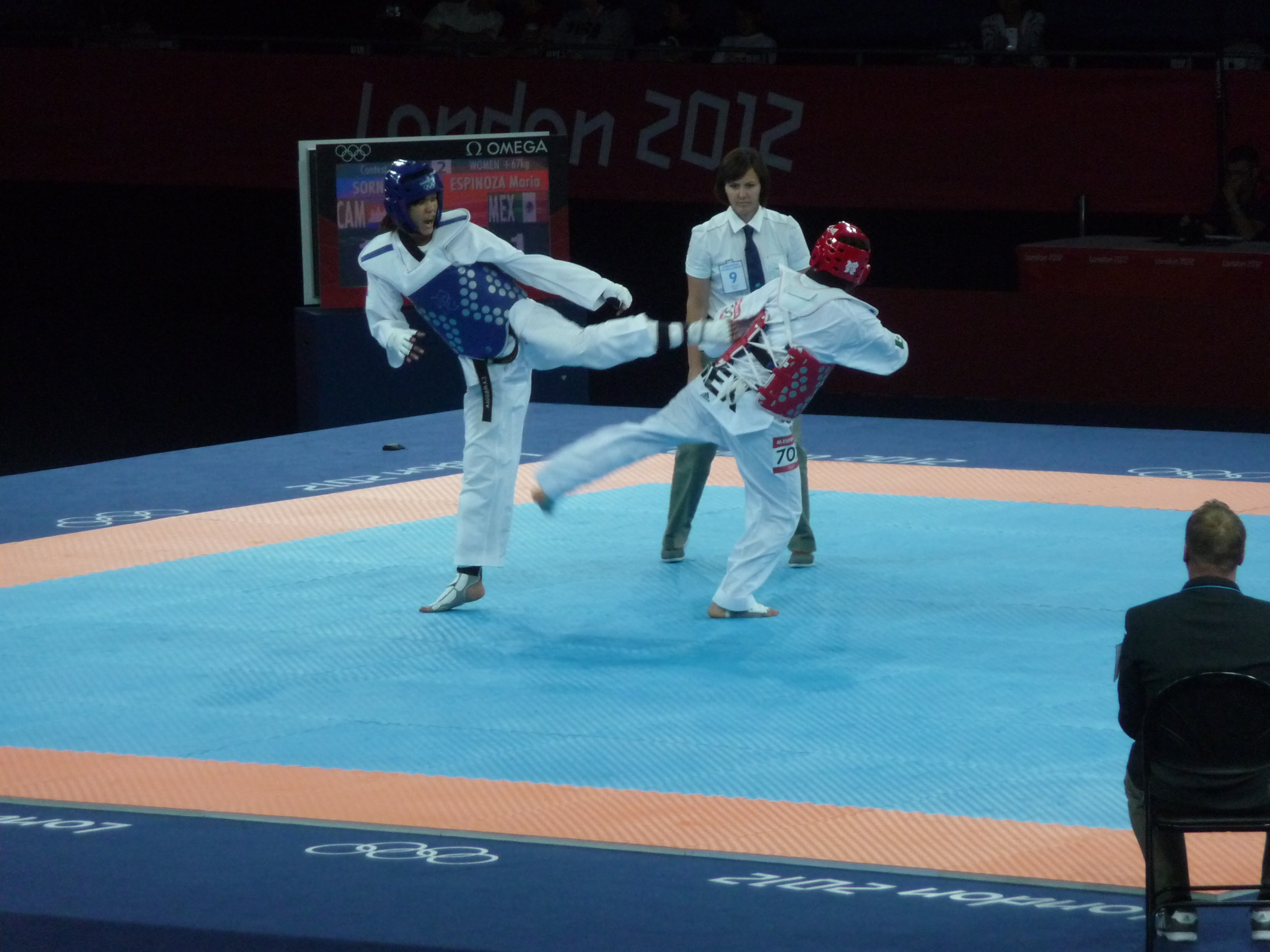
- Davin facing María del Rosario Espinoza at the 2012 Olympic Games

Personal information
- Nationality: Cambodian
- Born: Sorn Davin; February 6, 1992 (age 34) Phnom Penh, Cambodia
- Height: 1.78 m (5 ft 10 in)

Sport
- Country: Cambodia
- Sport: Taekwondo
- Event: Women's +67kg
Medal record
Women's taekwondo
Representing Cambodia
Southeast Asian Games
Silver medal – second place	2011 Jakarta–Palembang	67–73 kg
Silver medal – second place	2013 Naypyidaw	+73 kg
Bronze medal – third place	2009 Vientiane	73 kg
- Updated on 13 June 2015

Sorn Davin (born in Phnom Penh on 6 February 1992) is a taekwondo practitioner who represented Cambodia at the 2012 Summer Olympics, carrying the flag for her country during the Parade of Nations, and losing 3–2 to defending gold medal champion María del Rosario Espinoza of Mexico in the opening round.
