= Cambodia at the 1956 Summer Olympics =

- Flag of Cambodia
- IOC code: CAM
- NOC: Khmer Olympic Committee

in Melbourne/Stockholm
- Competitors: 2 in 1 sport
- Medals: Gold 0 Silver 0 Bronze 0 Total 0

Summer Olympics appearances (overview)
- 1956; 1960; 1964; 1968; 1972; 1976–1992; 1996; 2000; 2004; 2008; 2012; 2016; 2020; 2024

Cambodia competed in the Olympic Games for the first time at the 1956 Summer Olympics. Because Cambodia decided to join the boycott over the participation of the Soviet Union, who invaded Hungary during the USSR's invasion of Hungary, the nation did not send any athletes to Melbourne, Australia where all but equestrian events were held in late November, and early December. To accommodate Australia's strict animal quarantine regulations, Dressage, Eventing, and Show Jumping were held in June at Stockholm Olympic Stadium. Two Cambodian riders, Isoup Ganthy, and Saing Pen, competed in the equestrian events.

== Equestrian ==
=== Show jumping ===
Athlete	Horse	Event	Round 1		Round 2		Final	
Athlete	Horse	Event	Penalties	Rank	Penalties	Rank	Penalties	Rank
Saing Pen	Pompon	Individual	108.50	49	DNS		DNF	
Isoup Ganthy	Flatteur II	Individual	108.50	49	DNS		DNF	
