= Sopheak Phouk =

Cambodian sprinter (born 1984)

Sopheak Phouk (born 6 April 1984) is a Cambodian sprinter who competed at the 2004 Summer Olympics, recording a time of 11.56 in the 100 meter dash, placing him 8th in the first heat.
