= Khom Ratanakmony =

Cambodian judoka

Personal information
- Born: 3 November 1982 (age 42)
- Occupation: Judoka

Sport
- Sport: Judo

Profile at external databases
- JudoInside.com: 84951

Khom Ratanakmony (born 3 November 1982 in Phnom Penh) is a Cambodian judoka who competes in the men's 60 kg category. At the 2012 Summer Olympics he was defeated in the second round.
