= Khem Son =

Cambodian cyclist

Personal information
- Born: 1941 (age 84–85)

Cycling career
- Sport: Cycling

Khem Son (born 1941) is a former Cambodian cyclist. He competed in the team time trial and the individual pursuit events at the 1964 Summer Olympics.
