= Tit Linda Sou =

Cambodian sprinter (born 1989)

Tit Linda Sou (born August 21, 1989, in Phnom Penh) is a female track and field sprint athlete who competes internationally for Cambodia.

Sou represented Cambodia at the 2008 Summer Olympics in Beijing. She competed at the 100 metres sprint and placed seventh in her heat without advancing to the second round. She ran the distance in a time of 12.98 seconds.
