= Sovijja Pou =

Cambodian swimmer

Personal information
- National team: Cambodia
- Born: 18 July 1995 (age 30) Baltimore, Maryland, U.S.
- Height: 1.69 m (5 ft 7 in)
- Weight: 62 kg (137 lb)

Sport
- Sport: Swimming
- Strokes: Freestyle, butterfly, backstroke, breaststroke
- College team: Brown University Bears

Sovijja Pou (born 18 July 1995) is an American-Cambodian competition swimmer who competes mainly in the freestyle and butterfly events. In the 2015 Southeast Asian Games, he broke four of Cambodia's national swimming records (100m freestyle, 400m freestyle, 100m butterfly, 200m butterfly). He competed in the men's 100 metre freestyle event at the 2016 Summer Olympics, event where he ranked at 57th with a time of 54.55 seconds. He did not advance to the semifinals.

Pou is now an Internal Medicine resident physician at the Brown University affiliated teaching hospital.
