= Khan Prampir Makara =

Prampir Makara ប្រាំពីរមករា
- Section
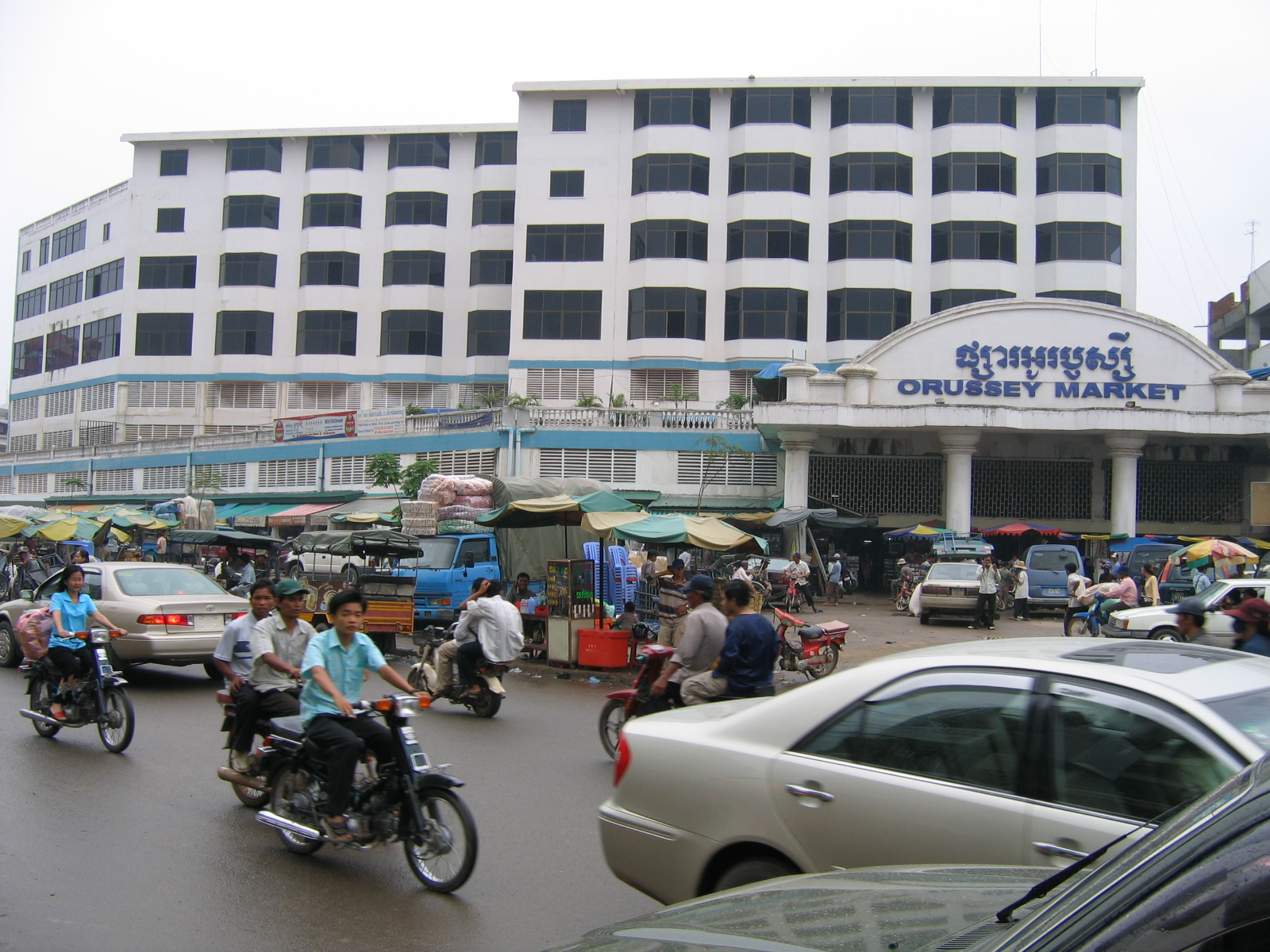
- Orussey Market

- Location of Prampir Makara within Phnom Penh
- Coordinates: 11°33′48″N 104°54′49″E
- Country: Cambodia
- Province: Phnom Penh
- Subdivisions: 8 sangkats

Area
  - Total: 2.21 km^{2} (0.85 sq mi)

Population (2019)
  - Total: ▼71,092

Demographics
  - Language(s): Khmer (official)
- Time zone: UTC+07:00 (ICT)
- Postal code: 12250

Prampir Makara (Khmer: ប្រាំពីរមករា [prampiː meakaraː]; meaning 'Seventh of January'), also 7 Makara (Khmer: ៧មករា; meaning '7th of January'), is a section (khan) in Phnom Penh, Cambodia. The section is subdivided into 8 sangkats and 33 kroms. The section has an area of 2.21 km^{2} (0.85 sq mi). It has a population of 71,092. It is the smallest section by land area but is the most densely populated section in Phnom Penh.

== Administration ==
No.	Sangkat (Commune)	Postal Code
1	Monorom	12251
2	Mittapheap	12252
3	Veal Vong	12253
4	Orussey I	12254
5	Orussey II	12255
6	Orussey III	12256
7	Orussey IV	12257
8	Boeung Prolit	12258

== Education ==
Canadian International School of Phnom Penh has one campus, located in Olympia City.
