= Chan Seyha =

Cambodian sprinter

Chan Seyha (born 9 August 1994 in Phnom Penh, Cambodia) is a Cambodian runner who competed in the 200 metre event at the 2011 World Championships in Athletics and also she competed at the 2012 Summer Olympics in the 200 m event but was eliminated in the first round.
