= Bunpichmorakat Kheun =

Cambodian swimmer (born 2006)

Personal information
- Nationality: Cambodian
- Born: 28 August 2006 (age 19) Phnom Penh

Sport
- Sport: Swimming

Bunpichmorakat Kheun (born 28 August 2006) is a Cambodian swimmer. She represented Cambodia at the 2020 Summer Olympics in the women's 50 metre freestyle and was one of two flag bearers for Cambodia in the opening ceremony.
