= Apsara Sakbun =

American-Cambodian swimmer (born 2001)

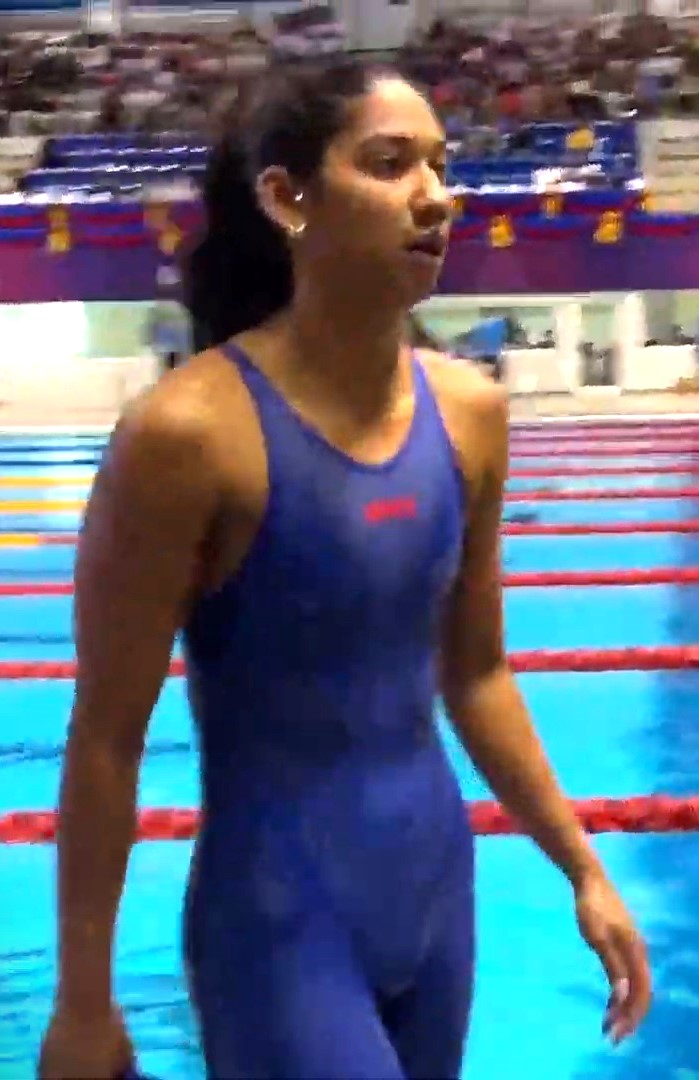
- Sakbun in 2024

Personal information
- Nationality: American / Cambodian
- Born: February 21, 2001 (age 25)

Sport
- Sport: Swimming
- College team: Ball State Cardinals

Apsara Katarina Sakbun (Khmer: សាក់ប៊ុន អប្សរា កាតារីណា, romanized: Sakboun Absaara Katarina; born February 21, 2001) is an American-Cambodian swimmer. She qualified to represent Cambodia at the 2024 Summer Olympics.

== Biography ==
Sakbun was born on February 21, 2001, and grew up in Terre Haute, Indiana. Her father is a Cambodian immigrant to the U.S., while her mother immigrated to the U.S. from Jamaica. Her sister Haley is also a swimmer, while her brother Brandon was elected mayor of Terre Haute in 2023. Growing up, she participated in a number of sports, including tennis, track, gymnastics and dance, before focusing solely on competitive swimming by high school.

Sakbun attended Terre Haute South Vigo High School and competed for four years in freestyle and backstroke events. She was an all-conference and all-state selection and won two sectional championship in the 100 backstroke and one in the 100 freestyle. At South Vigo, she set records in the 50 freestyle, 100 freestyle, 100 backstroke and 200 backstroke. She committed to swim in college for the Ball State Cardinals.

As a freshman at Ball State in 2019–20, Sakbun helped set the school 200 freestyle relay record and placed 10th at the Mid-American Conference (MAC) Championships in the 50 freestyle. She was named Academic All-MAC in 2020–21 and placed fifth at the MAC Championships in the 50 freestyle. She repeated as an Academic All-MAC selection in 2021–22 and was a part of the relay team that set school records in the 200 medley relay and 800 freestyle relay. She won her third Academic All-MAC selection in 2022–23 and helped break program records in the 400 freestyle relay and 200 freestyle relay. By 2023, Sakbun appeared in the school record books 15 times.

In 2023, Sakbun participated at the SEA Games representing Cambodia, where she set national records in three different events. That year, she moved from Terre Haute to Charlotte, North Carolina, and became an operations analyst for Wells Fargo. In North Carolina, she joined the Dowd YMCA and trained six days a week. In 2024, Cambodia qualified a swimmer for the 2024 Summer Olympics and Sakbun was notified that she was the top choice to fill the spot; she accepted, although if she had declined, her sister would have competed at the Olympics instead. She was selected to compete in the 50 m freestyle event at the Olympics.
