= Antoine de Lapparent =

Camodian swimmer

Personal information
- Nationality: Cambodia
- Born: 19 February 2006 (age 20) Phnom Penh, Cambodia

Antoine De Lapparent (born 19 February 2006) is a Cambodian swimmer who competed at the 2024 Summer Olympics in the 100 m freestyle. He placed 67th in the competition with a time of 52.95. He also competed at multiple World Championships and the Asian Games.
