= Ouk Chanthan =

Cambodian sprinter

Personal information
- Nationality: Cambodian
- Born: 11 March 1974 (age 51)

Sport
- Sport: Sprinting
- Event: 100 metres

Ouk Chanthan (born 11 March 1974) is a Cambodian sprinter. She competed in the 100 metres at the 1996 Summer Olympics and the 2000 Summer Olympics. With a time of 14.14 seconds, Chanthan finished 84th and last overall of all athletes in the women's 100 metres at the 2000 Summer Games and she did not progress to the second round of the competition.
