= Puch Hem =

Cambodian swimmer (born 1999)

Personal information
- Nationality: Cambodian
- Born: 3 May 1999 (age 26)

Sport
- Sport: Swimming

Puch Hem (born 3 May 1999) is a Cambodian swimmer. He competed in the men's 50 metre freestyle at the 2020 Summer Olympics.
