= Pen Sokong =

Cambodian sprinter

Personal information
- Nationality: Cambodian
- Born: 5 March 1994 (age 31) Phnom Penh, Cambodia

Sport
- Sport: Track and Field
- Event(s): 100 m, 200 m

Pen Sokong (born 5 March 1994) is an Olympic sprinter from Cambodia.

== Career ==
He competed at the 2019 IAAF World Athletics Championships in Doha in the 100m and 200m. He competed at the Athletics at the 2020 Summer Olympics – Men's 100 metres in Tokyo. He was the only Cambodian athlete at the games, with the countries other two competitors being swimmers. He finished sixth in his heat and did not advance.

After the Tokyo Olympics, he then stayed in Japan to train with Yumekomirai athletics club in the Kanagawa Prefecture. In 2023, he trained in China.
