= To Rithya =

Cambodian long-distance runner

Personal information
- Nationality: Cambodian
- Born: 10 October 1967 (age 58)

Sport
- Sport: Long-distance running
- Event: Marathon

To Rithya (born 10 October 1967) is a Cambodian long-distance runner. He competed in the men's marathon at the 1996 Summer Olympics and the 2000 Summer Olympics.
