= National Olympic Committee of Cambodia =

National Olympic Committee

- Country: Cambodia
- Code: CAM
- Created: 1983
- Recognized: 1994
- Continental Association: OCA
- Headquarters: Prampir Makara, Phnom Penh, Cambodia
- President: Thong Khon
- Secretary General: Vath Chamroeun
- Website: olympiccambodia.com

The National Olympic Committee of Cambodia (Khmer: គណៈកម្មាធិការជាតិអូឡាំពិកកម្ពុជា; IOC Code: CAM) is a National Olympic Committee representing Cambodia. It is headquartered in Prampir Makara, Phnom Penh, Cambodia.
