= Cycling at the 1964 Summer Olympics – Men's sprint =

Men's sprint at the Games of the XVIII Olympiad
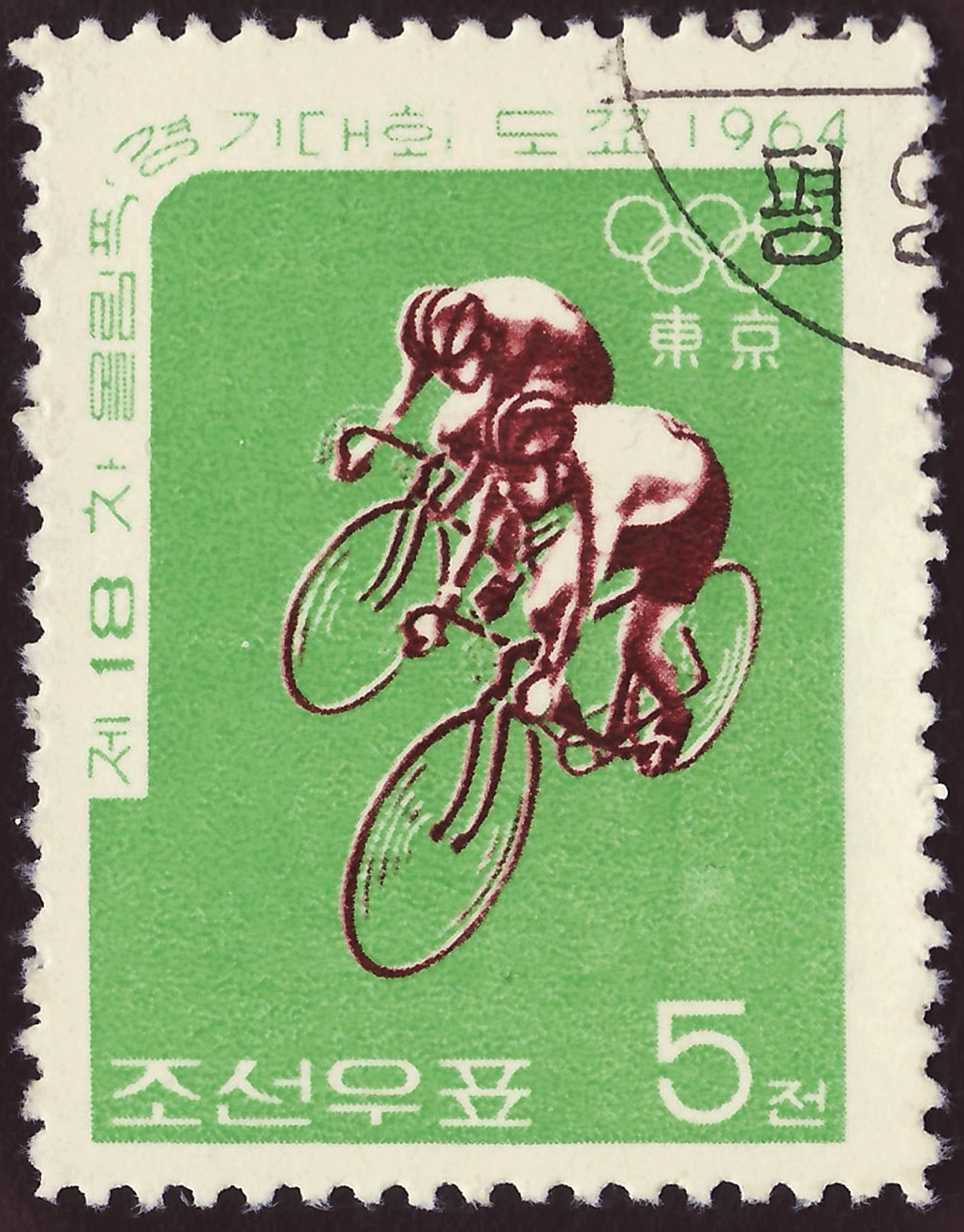
- North Korean stamp commemorating 1964 Olympic cycling
- Venue: Hachioji Road Race Course, Tokyo
- Dates: 17–18 October 1964
- Competitors: 39 from 22 nations

Medalists
1st place, gold medalist(s)		Giovanni Pettenella; Italy
2nd place, silver medalist(s)		Sergio Bianchetto; Italy
3rd place, bronze medalist(s)		Daniel Morelon; France

The men's sprint was a track cycling event held as part of the Cycling at the 1964 Summer Olympics programme. It was held on 17 and 18 October 1964 at the Hachioji Velodrome. 39 cyclists from 22 nations competed. Nations were limited to two cyclists each. The event was won by Giovanni Pettenella of Italy, the nation's second consecutive and fourth overall victory in the men's sprint (trailing only France's five gold medals all-time). Sergio Bianchetto took silver, making it the second consecutive Games in which Italy had two men on the podium in the event. It was also the fifth straight Games with Italy taking at least silver. Daniel Morelon of France took bronze, the first of his record four medals in the event.

== Background ==
This was the 13th appearance of the event, which has been held at every Summer Olympics except 1904 and 1912. None of the quarterfinalists from 1960 returned. Italy and France, which had combined for 8 of the 12 previous gold medals, had strong teams. France was favored, with Pierre Trentin and Daniel Morelon the top two at the 1964 World Championship. Third place had gone to Italian Sergio Bianchetto, who had also won Olympic gold in the tandem in 1960. The other Italian, Giovanni Pettenella, was less well-known but had taken silver in the track time trial earlier in the Games. Belgium also had a strong contender, with 1963 World Champion Patrick Sercu.

Cambodia made its debut in the men's sprint. France made its 13th appearance, the only nation to have competed at every appearance of the event.

== Competition format ==
Sprint cycling involves a series of head-to-head matches. The 1964 competition involved nine rounds: heats, a two-round repechage, 1/8 finals, another two-round repechage, quarterfinals, semifinals, and finals.

- Heats: The 39 competitors were divided into 13 heats of 3 cyclists each. The winner of each heat advanced directly to the 1/8 finals (13 cyclists), while all other cyclists who competed were sent to the first repechage (26 cyclists).
- Repechage 1: This was a two-round repechage. The first round consisted of 10 heats of 2 or 3 cyclists each. The winners advanced to the second round of the repechage, while the losers were eliminated. The second round had 5 heats of 2 cyclists each; the winner of each heat joined the main competition again at the 1/8 finals (5 cyclists) while the loser was eliminated.
- 1/8 finals: The 18 cyclists who advanced through the heats or the first repechage competed in a 1/8 finals round. There were 6 heats in this round, with 3 cyclists in each. The top cyclist in each heat advanced to the quarterfinals (6 cyclists), while the other 2 in each heat went to the second repechage (12 cyclists).
- Repechage 2: This was another two-round repechage. This repechage began with 4 heats of 3 cyclists each. The top cyclist in each heat advanced to the second round, while the other 2 cyclists in each heat were eliminated. The second round of this repechage featured 2 heats of 2 cyclists each, with the winners advancing to the quarterfinals and the losers eliminated.
- Quarterfinals: Beginning with the quarterfinals, all matches were one-on-one competitions and were held in best-of-three format. There were 4 quarterfinals, with the winner of each advancing to the semifinals and the loser eliminated.
- Semifinals: The two semifinals provided for advancement to the gold medal final for winners and to the bronze medal final for losers.
- Finals: Both a gold medal final and a bronze medal final were held.

== Records ==
The records for the sprint are 200 metre flying time trial records, kept for the qualifying round in later Games as well as for the finish of races.

World record	Sante Gaiardoni (ITA)	11.0	Rome, Italy	30 July 1960
Olympic record	Valentino Gasparella (ITA)	11.1	Rome, Italy	29 August 1960

No new world or Olympic records were set during the competition.

== Schedule ==
All times are Japan Standard Time (UTC+9)

Date	Time	Round
Saturday, 17 October 1964	10:00 14:00	Round 1 First repechage semifinals First repechage finals 1/8 finals Second repechage semifinals Second repechage finals
Sunday, 18 October 1964	10:00; 14:00	Quarterfinals; Semifinals; Finals

== Results ==
=== Round 1 ===
In the first round of heats, the 39 cyclists were divided into 13 heats of 3 cyclists each. The winner of each heat advanced to the 1/8 finals, while the 26 remaining cyclists were relegated to the first round of repechages.

==== Heat 1 ====
Rank	Cyclist	Nation	Time 200 m	Notes
1	Pierre Trentin	France	12.77	Q
2	Nguyễn Văn Châu	Vietnam		R
3	Jose Tellez	Mexico		R

==== Heat 2 ====
Rank	Cyclist	Nation	Time 200 m	Notes
1	Daniel Morelon	France	12.84	Q
2	Eduardo Bustos	Colombia		R
3	Tan Thol	Cambodia		R

==== Heat 3 ====
Rank	Cyclist	Nation	Time 200 m	Notes
1	Sergio Bianchetto	Italy	11.58	Q
2	Muhammad Hafeez	Pakistan		R
3	Suchha Singh	India		R

==== Heat 4 ====
Rank	Cyclist	Nation	Time 200 m	Notes
1	Patrick Sercu	Belgium	11.67	Q
2	Oscar García	Argentina		R
3	Amar Singh Billing	India		R

==== Heat 5 ====
Rank	Cyclist	Nation	Time 200 m	Notes
1	Ivan Kučírek	Czechoslovakia	11.60	Q
2	Roger Gibbon	Trinidad and Tobago		R
3	Alan Grieco	United States		R

==== Heat 6 ====
Rank	Cyclist	Nation	Time 200 m	Notes
1	Karl Barton	Great Britain	12.68	Q
2	Richárd Bicskey	Hungary		R
—	Carlos Alberto Vázquez	Argentina	DNF	

==== Heat 7 ====
Rank	Cyclist	Nation	Time 200 m	Notes
1	Giovanni Pettenella	Italy	11.40	Q
2	Fitzroy Hoyte	Trinidad and Tobago		R
3	Tim Phivana	Cambodia		R

==== Heat 8 ====
Rank	Cyclist	Nation	Time 200 m	Notes
1	Omar Pkhak'adze	Soviet Union	12.26	Q
2	Willi Fuggerer	United Team of Germany		R
3	Peder Pedersen	Denmark		R

==== Heat 9 ====
Rank	Cyclist	Nation	Time 200 m	Notes
1	Valery Khitrov	Soviet Union	11.54	Q
2	Christopher Church	Great Britain		R
3	Arie de Graaf	Netherlands		R

==== Heat 10 ====
Rank	Cyclist	Nation	Time 200 m	Notes
1	Katsuhiko Sato	Japan	11.92	Q
2	José Mercado	Mexico		R
3	Jackie Simes	United States		R

==== Heat 11 ====
Rank	Cyclist	Nation	Time 200 m	Notes
1	Thomas Harrison	Australia	11.60	Q
2	Pieter van der Touw	Netherlands		R
3	Ferenc Habony	Hungary		R

==== Heat 12 ====
Rank	Cyclist	Nation	Time 200 m	Notes
1	Mario Vanegas	Colombia	12.09	Q
2	Gordon Johnson	Australia		R
3	Zbysław Zając	Poland		R

==== Heat 13 ====
Rank	Cyclist	Nation	Time 200 m	Notes
1	Ulrich Schillinger	United Team of Germany	12.60	Q
2	Niels Fredborg	Denmark		R
3	Tsuyoshi Kawachi	Japan		R

=== First repechage semifinals ===
All of the competitors who had not qualified for the 1/8 finals in the heats competed in the first round repechage. Ten heats, each with 2 or 3 cyclists, were held. The winner of each heat moved on to the first round repechage finals, all others (16 in all) were eliminated.

==== First repechage semifinal 1 ====
Rank	Cyclist	Nation	Time 200 m	Notes
1	Oscar Garcia	Argentina	12.16	Q
2	Fitzroy Hoyte	Trinidad and Tobago		
3	Jose Tellez	Mexico		

==== First repechage semifinal 2 ====
Rank	Cyclist	Nation	Time 200 m	Notes
1	Roger Gibbon	Trinidad and Tobago	11.65	Q
2	Tsuyoshi Kawachi	Japan		
3	Tim Phivana	Cambodia		

==== First repechage semifinal 3 ====
Rank	Cyclist	Nation	Time 200 m	Notes
1	Zbysław Zając	Poland	12.31	Q
2	Nguyễn Văn Châu	Vietnam		
3	Amar Singh Billing	India		

==== First repechage semifinal 4 ====
Rank	Cyclist	Nation	Time 200 m	Notes
1	Tan Thol	Cambodia	13.00	Q
2	Richárd Bicskey	Hungary		
3	Christopher Church	Great Britain		

==== First repechage semifinal 5 ====
Rank	Cyclist	Nation	Time 200 m	Notes
1	Niels Fredborg	Denmark	12.31	Q
2	Alan Grieco	United States		
3	José Mercado	Mexico		

==== First repechage semifinal 6 ====
Rank	Cyclist	Nation	Time 200 m	Notes
1	Willi Fuggerer	United Team of Germany	12.69	Q
2	Jackie Simes	United States		

==== First repechage semifinal 7 ====
Rank	Cyclist	Nation	Time 200 m	Notes
1	Peder Pedersen	Denmark	11.61	Q
2	Muhammad Hafeez	Pakistan		

==== First repechage semifinal 8 ====
Rank	Cyclist	Nation	Time 200 m	Notes
1	Arie de Graaf	Netherlands	12.21	Q
2	Suchha Singh	India		

==== First repechage semifinal 9 ====
Rank	Cyclist	Nation	Time 200 m	Notes
1	Pieter van der Touw	Netherlands	12.48	Q
2	Eduardo Bustos	Colombia		

==== First repechage semifinal 10 ====
Rank	Cyclist	Nation	Time 200 m	Notes
1	Gordon Johnson	Australia	12.20	Q
2	Ferenc Habony	Hungary		

=== First repechage finals ===
The winners of the 10 heats of the elimination round of the first repechage competed against each other in 5 heats of repechage finals. The winners of the five heats advanced to the 1/8 finals, the losers were eliminated.

==== First repechage final 1 ====
Rank	Cyclist	Nation	Time 200 m	Notes
1	Zbysław Zając	Poland	12.09	Q
2	Oscar Garcia	Argentina		

==== First repechage final 2 ====
Rank	Cyclist	Nation	Time 200 m	Notes
1	Niels Fredborg	Denmark	12.25	Q
2	Tan Thol	Cambodia		

==== First repechage final 3 ====
Rank	Cyclist	Nation	Time 200 m	Notes
1	Peder Pedersen	Denmark	11.91	Q
2	Pieter van der Touw	Netherlands		

==== First repechage final 4 ====
Rank	Cyclist	Nation	Time 200 m	Notes
1	Roger Gibbon	Trinidad and Tobago	11.35	Q
2	Arie de Graaf	Netherlands		

==== First repechage final 5 ====
Rank	Cyclist	Nation	Time 200 m	Notes
1	Willi Fuggerer	United Team of Germany	11.52	Q
2	Gordon Johnson	Australia		

=== 1/8 finals ===
The 18 remaining cyclists competed in 6 heats of 3 cyclists in the 1/8 finals. The winner of each heat advanced to the quarterfinals, with the 2 defeated cyclists in each heat relegated to the second round of repechages.

==== 1/8 final 1 ====
Rank	Cyclist	Nation	Time 200 m	Notes
1	Mario Vanegas	Colombia	12.07	Q
2	Omar Pkhak'adze	Soviet Union		R
3	Pierre Trentin	France		R

==== 1/8 final 2 ====
Rank	Cyclist	Nation	Time 200 m	Notes
1	Daniel Morelon	France	11.93	Q
2	Niels Fredborg	Denmark		R
3	Karl Barton	Great Britain		R

==== 1/8 final 3 ====
Rank	Cyclist	Nation	Time 200 m	Notes
1	Sergio Bianchetto	Italy	11.83	Q
2	Ulrich Schillinger	United Team of Germany		R
3	Peder Pedersen	Denmark		R

==== 1/8 final 4 ====
Rank	Cyclist	Nation	Time 200 m	Notes
1	Patrick Sercu	Belgium	11.43	Q
2	Thomas Harrison	Australia		R
3	Roger Gibbon	Trinidad and Tobago		R

==== 1/8 final 5 ====
Rank	Cyclist	Nation	Time 200 m	Notes
1	Zbysław Zając	Poland	12.06	Q
2	Valery Khitrov	Soviet Union		R
3	Giovanni Pettenella	Italy		R

==== 1/8 final 6 ====
Rank	Cyclist	Nation	Time 200 m	Notes
1	Willi Fuggerer	United Team of Germany	12.15	Q
2	Ivan Kučírek	Czechoslovakia		R
3	Katsuhiko Sato	Japan		R

=== Second repechage semifinals ===
Four heats of three cyclists each were held, with the winner of each moving to the finals of the second repechage while the other 8 cyclists were eliminated.

==== Second repechage semifinal 1 ====
Rank	Cyclist	Nation	Time 200 m	Notes
1	Pierre Trentin	France	12.81	Q
2	Karl Barton	Great Britain		
3	Roger Gibbon	Trinidad and Tobago	DNF	

==== Second repechage semifinal 2 ====
Rank	Cyclist	Nation	Time 200 m	Notes
1	Giovanni Pettenella	Italy	12.06	Q
2	Ulrich Schillinger	United Team of Germany		
3	Niels Fredborg	Denmark		

==== Second repechage semifinal 3 ====
Rank	Cyclist	Nation	Time 200 m	Notes
1	Omar Pkhak'adze	Soviet Union	11.70	Q
2	Thomas Harrison	Australia		
3	Katsuhiko Sato	Japan		

==== Second repechage semifinal 4 ====
Rank	Cyclist	Nation	Time 200 m	Notes
1	Valery Khitrov	Soviet Union	11.45	Q
2	Ivan Kučírek	Czechoslovakia		
3	Peder Pedersen	Denmark		

=== Second repechage finals ===
The four winners of the eliminations of the second repechage faced off in two heats of finals for the repechage. The winner in each heat moved on to the semifinals, the loser was eliminated.

==== Second repechage final 1 ====
Rank	Cyclist	Nation	Time 200 m	Notes
1	Pierre Trentin	France	11.88	Q
2	Valery Khitrov	Soviet Union		

==== Second repechage final 2 ====
Rank	Cyclist	Nation	Time 200 m	Notes
1	Giovanni Pettenella	Italy	11.71	Q
2	Omar Pkhak'adze	Soviet Union		

=== Quarterfinals ===
The quarterfinals, which began the day of 19 October, were the first round of direct elimination. The 8 remaining cyclists were paired off into four heats. The winner of each match, which was in a best-of-three format, advanced, the loser was eliminated.

==== Quarterfinal 1 ====
Rank	Cyclist	Nation	Race 1	Race 2	Race 3	Notes
1	Daniel Morelon	France	12.07	12.18	—	Q
2	Zbysław Zając	Poland			—	

==== Quarterfinal 2 ====
Rank	Cyclist	Nation	Race 1	Race 2	Race 3	Notes
1	Sergio Bianchetto	Italy	13.00	12.31	—	Q
2	Mario Vanegas	Colombia			—	

==== Quarterfinal 3 ====
Rank	Cyclist	Nation	Race 1	Race 2	Race 3	Notes
1	Giovanni Pettenella	Italy	12.03	11.57	—	Q
2	Patrick Sercu	Belgium			—	

==== Quarterfinal 4 ====
Rank	Cyclist	Nation	Race 1	Race 2	Race 3	Notes
1	Pierre Trentin	France		12.58	12.72	Q
2	Willi Fuggerer	United Team of Germany	12.52			

=== Semifinals ===
The semifinals were also raced in a best-of-three format. The winner of each semifinal advanced to the gold medal match, while the loser was sent to the bronze medal match.

==== Semifinal 1 ====
Trentin was penalized for interference in the second race.

Rank	Cyclist	Nation	Race 1	Race 2	Race 3	Notes
1	Giovanni Pettenella	Italy		wo	12.74	Q
2	Pierre Trentin	France	12.89	DSQ		B

==== Semifinal 2 ====
During their semifinal, Pettenella and Trentin set an Olympic record by standing still for 21 minutes and 57 seconds.

Rank	Cyclist	Nation	Race 1	Race 2	Race 3	Notes
1	Sergio Bianchetto	Italy	12.52		12.91	Q
2	Daniel Morelon	France		11.83		B

=== Finals ===
The two finals each pitted a pair of countrymen against each other; Italians in the gold medal match and Frenchmen in the bronze. Again the format was best-of-three.

==== Bronze medal match ====
Rank	Cyclist	Nation	Race 1	Race 2	Race 3
3rd place, bronze medalist(s)	Daniel Morelon	France		11.58	13.85
4	Pierre Trentin	France	11.42		

==== Final ====
Rank	Cyclist	Nation	Race 1	Race 2	Race 3
1st place, gold medalist(s)	Giovanni Pettenella	Italy	13.85	13.69	—
2nd place, silver medalist(s)	Sergio Bianchetto	Italy			—

== Sources ==
- Tokyo Organizing Committee (1964). The Games of the XVIII Olympiad: Tokyo 1964, vol. 2.
