= Cycling at the 1964 Summer Olympics – Men's tandem =

Men's cycling tandem at the Games of the XVIII Olympiad
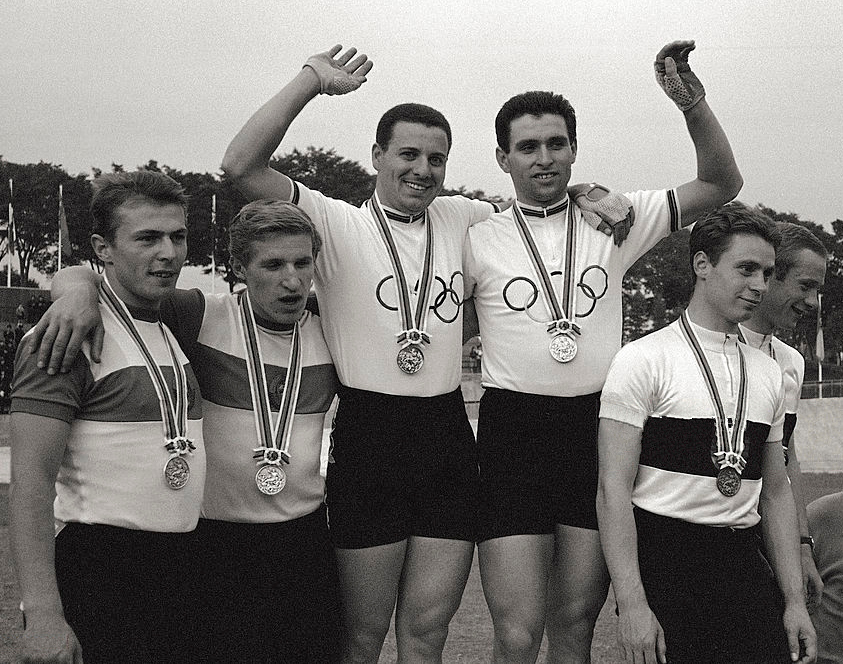
- Venue: Hachioji Road Race Course, Tokyo
- Date: 20 October 1964
- Competitors: 26 from 13 nations

Medalists
1st place, gold medalist(s)		Angelo Damiano and Sergio Bianchetto	Italy
2nd place, silver medalist(s)		Imants Bodnieks and Viktor Logunov	Soviet Union
3rd place, bronze medalist(s)		Willi Fuggerer and Klaus Kobusch	United Team of Germany

The men's tandem was a track cycling event held as part of the Cycling at the 1964 Summer Olympics programme. It was held on 21 October 1964 at the Hachioji Velodrome. 13 pairs competed.

== Medalists ==
Gold	Silver	Bronze
Angelo Damiano and Sergio Bianchetto (ITA)	Imants Bodnieks and Viktor Logunov (URS)	Willi Fuggerer and Klaus Kobusch (EUA)

== Results ==
=== Heats ===
The 13 pairs competed in 6 heats of 2 cyclists (one of 3) in the heats. The winner of each heat advanced to the quarterfinals, with the defeated cyclists relegated to the repechage.

Heat 1
1.	Angelo Damiano and Sergio Bianchetto (ITA)	11.00	QQ
2.	José Mercado and Jose Tellez (MEX)		QRE
Heat 2
1.	Richárd Bicskey and Ferenc Habony (HUN)	10.97	QQ
2.	Hideo Madarame and Toshimitsu Teshima (JPN)		QRE
Heat 3
1.	Imants Bodnieks and Viktor Logunov (URS)	10.67	QQ
2.	Karel Paar and Karel Štark (TCH)		QRE
Heat 4
1.	Willi Fuggerer and Klaus Kobusch (EUA)	11.18	QQ
2.	Niels Fredborg and Per Sarto Jørgensen (DEN)		QRE
Heat 5
1.	Ian Browne and Daryl Perkins (AUS)	10.81	QQ
2.	Daniel Morelon and Pierre Trentin (FRA)		QRE
Heat 6
1.	Arie de Graaf and Pieter van der Touw (NED)	11.29	QQ
2.	Karl Barton and Christopher Church (GBR)		QRE
3.	Jack Disney and Tim Mountford (USA)		QRE

==== Repechage, eliminations ====
Three heats of two or three cyclists each were held, with the winner of each moving to the finals of the repechage while the other 4 cyclists were eliminated.

Heat 1
1.	Daniel Morelon and Pierre Trentin (FRA)	13.49	QRF
2.	José Mercado and Jose Tellez (MEX)
3.	Hideo Madarame and Toshimitsu Teshima (JPN)
Heat 2
1.	Karel Paar and Karel Štark (TCH)	10.77	QRF
2.	Jack Disney and Tim Mountford (USA)
Heat 3
1.	Niels Fredborg and Per Sarto Jørgensen (DEN)	11.03	QRF
2.	Karl Barton and Christopher Church (GBR)

===== Repechage, finals =====
There was one heat of finals for the repechage, with the top two pairs advancing to the quarterfinals and the third pair eliminated.

Heat 1
1.	Karel Paar and Karel Štark (TCH)	10.82	QQ
2.	Niels Fredborg and Per Sarto Jørgensen (DEN)		QQ
3.	Daniel Morelon and Pierre Trentin (FRA)

=== Quarterfinals ===
The quarterfinals saw the 8 remaining pairs paired off into four heats. The winner of each match, which was in a best-of-three format, advanced, the loser was eliminated.

Quarterfinal 1
1.	Angelo Damiano and Sergio Bianchetto (ITA)	10.67	10.84	—	QS
2.	Niels Fredborg and Per Sarto Jørgensen (DEN)			—
Quarterfinal 2
1.	Imants Bodnieks and Viktor Logunov (URS)	10.58	10.70	—	QS
2.	Ian Browne and Daryl Perkins (AUS)			—
Quarterfinal 3
1.	Willi Fuggerer and Klaus Kobusch (EUA)	10.82	10.84	—	QS
2.	Richárd Bicskey and Ferenc Habony (HUN)			—
Quarterfinal 4
1.	Arie de Graaf and Pieter van der Touw (NED)		10.87	11.32	QS
2.	Karel Paar and Karel Štark (TCH)	10.95

=== Semifinals ===
The semifinals were also raced in a best-of-three format. The winner of each semifinal advanced to the gold medal match, while the loser was sent to the bronze medal match. Germany initially won their semifinals against Italy, but were disqualified in the third race for moving out of their lane in the final sprint.

Semifinal 1
1.	Angelo Damiano and Sergio Bianchetto (ITA)		11.03	wo	QG
2.	Willi Fuggerer and Klaus Kobusch (EUA)	10.90		DQ	QB
Semifinal 2
1.	Imants Bodnieks and Viktor Logunov (URS)	10.78	10.65	—	QG
2.	Arie de Graaf and Pieter van der Touw (NED)			—	QB

=== Finals ===
Gold medal match
	Angelo Damiano and Sergio Bianchetto (ITA)		10.85	10.75
	Imants Bodnieks and Viktor Logunov (URS)	10.80
Bronze medal match
	Willi Fuggerer and Klaus Kobusch (EUA)	10.98	11.04	—
4.	Arie de Graaf and Pieter van der Touw (NED)			—

== Sources ==
- Tokyo Organizing Committee (1964). The Games of the XVIII Olympiad: Tokyo 1964, vol. 2.
