= Cycling at the 1964 Summer Olympics – Men's track time trial =

Men's cycling track time trial at the Games of the XVIII Olympiad
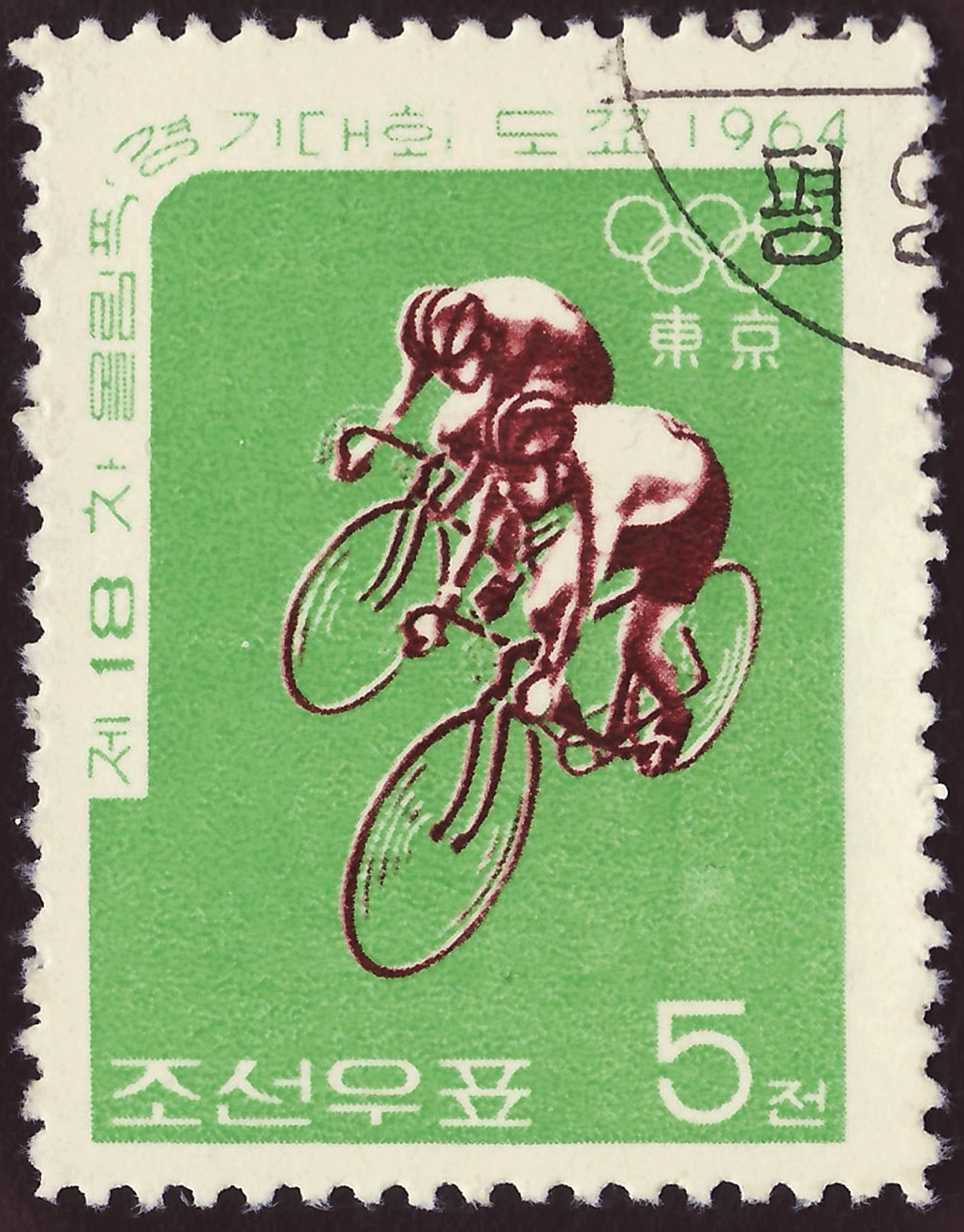
- North Korean stamp commemorating 1964 Olympic cycling
- Venue: Hachioji Road Race Course, Tokyo
- Date: 16 October 1964
- Competitors: 27 from 27 nations
- Winning time: 1:09.59

Medalists
1st place, gold medalist(s)		Patrick Sercu	Belgium
2nd place, silver medalist(s)		Giovanni Pettenella	Italy
3rd place, bronze medalist(s)		Pierre Trentin	France

The men's track time trial was a track cycling event held as part of the Cycling at the 1964 Summer Olympics programme. It was held on 16 October 1964 at the Hachioji Velodrome. Twenty-seven cyclists from 27 nations competed, with each nation limited to one competitor. The event was won by Patrick Sercu of Belgium, the nation's first victory in the men's track time trial and first medal in the event since 1948. Giovanni Pettenella's silver medal put Italy on the podium for the event for the fourth consecutive Games, while Pierre Trentin's bronze was the first medal for France in the event since 1948.

== Background ==
This was the ninth appearance of the event, which had previously been held in 1896 and every Games since 1928. It would be held every Games until being dropped from the programme after 2004. The only returning cyclist from the 1960 Games was fourth-place finisher Piet van der Touw of the Netherlands. Patrick Sercu was the 1963 sprint world champion.

Cambodia, the Republic of China, Malaysia, and Thailand each made their debut in the men's track time trial. France and Great Britain each made their ninth appearance, having competed at every appearance of the event.

== Competition format ==
The event was a time trial on the track, with each cyclist competing separately to attempt to achieve the fastest time. Each cyclist raced one kilometre from a standing start.

== Records ==
The following were the world and Olympic records prior to the competition.

World record	Sante Gaiardoni (ITA)	1:07.27	Rome, Italy	26 August 1960
Olympic record	Sante Gaiardoni (ITA)	1:07.27	Rome, Italy	26 August 1960

No new world or Olympic records were set during the competition.

== Schedule ==
All times are Japan Standard Time (UTC+9)

Date	Time	Round
Friday, 16 October 1964	14:00	Final

== Results ==
Rank	Cyclist	Nation	200 m	400 m	800 m	Time
1st place, gold medalist(s)	Patrick Sercu	Belgium	17.40	29.59	55.62	1:09.59
2nd place, silver medalist(s)	Giovanni Pettenella	Italy	16.65	28.77	55.40	1:10.09
3rd place, bronze medalist(s)	Pierre Trentin	France	17.83	30.72	57.00	1:10.42
4	Pieter van der Touw	Netherlands	16.54	29.41	56.27	1:10.68
5	Jiří Pecka	Czechoslovakia	17.20	29.51	56.32	1:10.70
6	Lothar Claesges	United Team of Germany	17.24	29.92	56.44	1:10.86
7	Wacław Latocha	Poland	18.39	30.90	56.99	1:11.12
8	Roger Gibbon	Trinidad and Tobago	16.49	29.21	56.54	1:11.19
9	Viktor Logunov	Soviet Union	16.77	29.02	56.19	1:11.36
10	Katsuhiko Sato	Japan	16.53	28.87	56.27	1:11.68
11	Jan Ingstrup-Mikkelsen	Denmark	17.92	30.44	57.44	1:12.03
12	Carlos Alberto Vázquez	Argentina	18.59	31.61	58.23	1:12.18
13	José Mercado	Mexico	17.27	29.87	57.54	1:12.83
14	William Kund	United States	18.60	31.25	58.21	1:12.89
15	Stefan Kirev	Bulgaria	17.89	30.81	58.16	1:13.06
16	Richard Paris	Australia	19.42	31.86	58.61	1:13.27
17	Roger Whitfield	Great Britain	18.13	30.55	57.99	1:13.29
18	Ferenc Habony	Hungary	18.15	31.52	59.80	1:14.48
19	Eduardo Bustos	Colombia	18.38	31.48	59.81	1:15.05
20	Oscar Almada	Uruguay	18.65	32.50	1:01.51	1:17.17
21	Preeda Chullamondhol	Thailand	18.40	31.59	1:01.45	1:18.06
22	Tan Thol	Cambodia	19.68	33.27	1:02.15	1:18.20
23	Muhammad Hafeez	Pakistan	20.09	33.79	1:02.73	1:18.50
24	Ng Joo Pong	Malaysia	19.55	33.48	1:04.16	1:20.68
25	Trần Văn Nen	Vietnam	19.22	34.75	1:05.40	1:21.58
26	Dalbir Singh Gill	India	20.29	34.48	1:04.82	1:21.62
—	Shue Ming-Shu	Taiwan	DNF			

== Sources ==
- Tokyo Organizing Committee (1964). The Games of the XVIII Olympiad: Tokyo 1964, vol. 2.
