= Madarame =

Madarame (Japanese: 班目) is a Japanese surname. Notable people with the surname include:

- Hideo Madarame (born 1944), Japanese former cyclist
- Makio Madarame (born 1972), Japanese former cyclist

== Fictional characters ==
- Baku Madarame, the main character from Usogui
- Ichiryusai Madarame, a major antagonist from Persona 5
- Shion Madarame, an antagonist from Tokyo Revengers
