= Katsuhiko Sato =

Katsuhiko Sato may also refer to:

- Katsuhiko Sato (physicist) (佐藤 勝彦, born 1945), Japanese physicist, professor at the University of Tokyo
- Katsuhiko Sato (cyclist) (佐藤 勝彦, 1943), Japanese cyclist

== See also ==
- Satō
