= Klaus Kobusch =

German cyclist (1941–2025)

- Kobusch at the 1964 Olympics

Personal information
- Born: 15 March 1941 Bielefeld, Gau Westphalia-North, Germany
- Died: 12 March 2025 (aged 83) Leopoldshöhe, North Rhine-Westphalia, Germany
- Height: 1.77 m (5 ft 10 in)
- Weight: 75 kg (165 lb)

Cycling career
- Sport: Cycling
Medal record
Men's cycling
Representing Germany
Olympic Games
Bronze medal – third place	1964 Tokyo	Tandem

Klaus Kobusch (15 March 1941 – 12 March 2025) was a German track cyclist who won a bronze medal at the 1964 Olympics in the 2000 m tandem and finished fifth in the 2000 m sprint at the 1968 Games. In the 1964 tandem semifinals, he and Willi Fuggerer apparently won 2–1 against the Italian team, but were disqualified in the third race for moving out of their lane in the final sprint. Kobusch died in Leopoldshöhe, North Rhine-Westphalia on 12 March 2025, at the age of 83.
