= Toshimitsu =

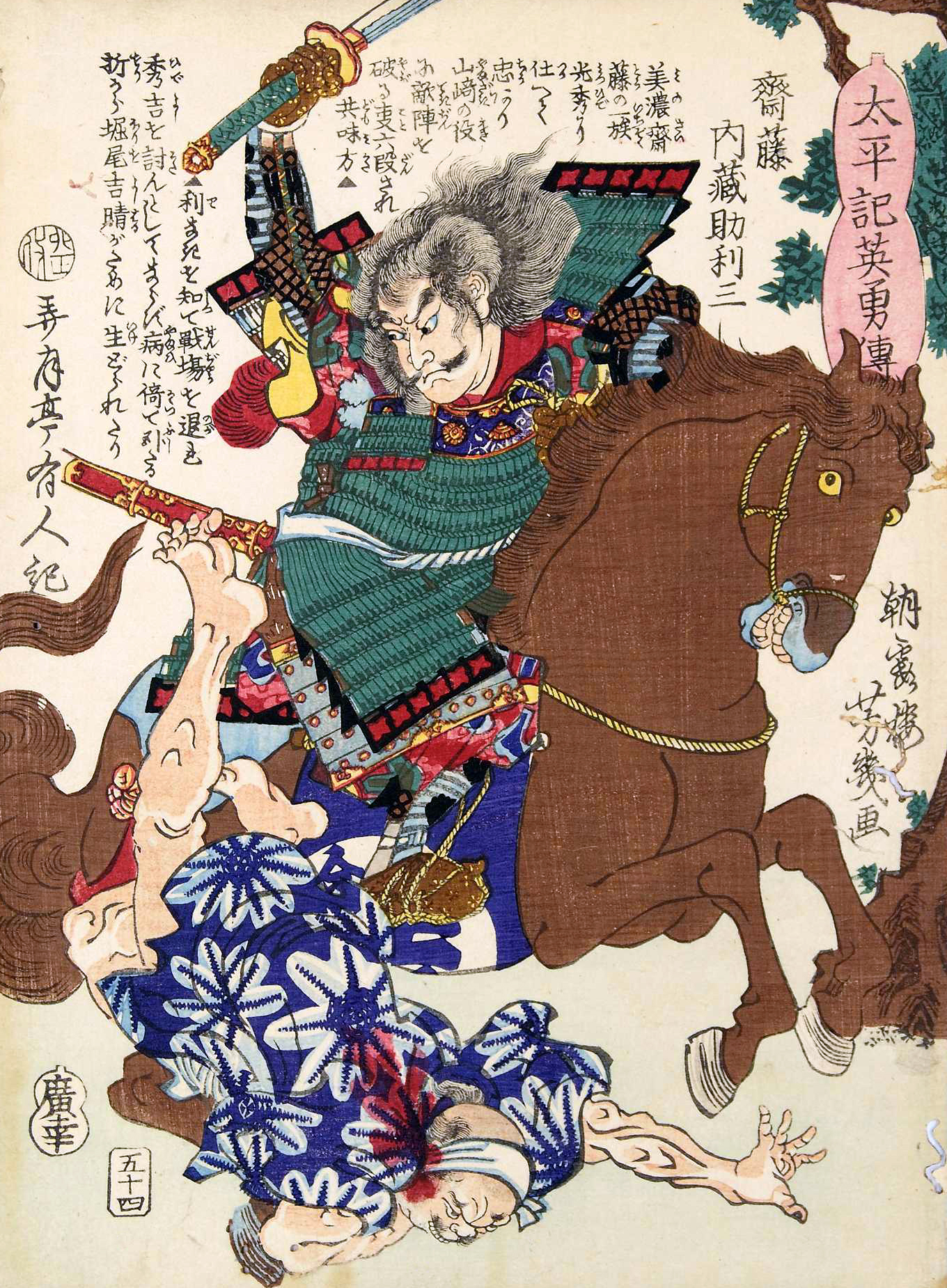
- Toshimitsu Saito (1534–1582), Japanese samurai
- Pronunciation: toɕimitsɯ (IPA)
- Gender: Male

Origin
- Origin: Japanese
- Meaning: Different meanings depending on the kanji used

Other names
- Alternative spelling: Tosimitu (Kunrei-shiki) Tosimitu (Nihon-shiki) Toshimitsu (Hepburn)

Toshimitsu is a masculine Japanese given name.

== Written forms ==
Toshimitsu can be written using different combinations of kanji characters. Some examples:

- 敏光, "agile, light"
- 敏満, "agile, full"
- 敏三, "agile, three"
- 俊光, "talented, light"
- 俊満, "talented, full"
- 俊三, "talented, three"
- 利光, "benefit, light"
- 利満, "benefit, full"
- 利三, "benefit, three"
- 年光, "year, light"
- 年満, "year, full"
- 寿光, "long life, light"
- 寿満, "long life, full"

The name can also be written in hiragana としみつ or katakana トシミツ.

== Notable people with the name ==
- Toshimitsu Arai (新居 利光, born 1948), Japanese voice actor.
- Toshimitsu Asai (浅井 俊光, born 1983), Japanese footballer.
- Toshimitsu Deyama (出山 利三, born 1965), Japanese singer.
- Toshimitsu Izawa (伊沢 利光, born 1968), Japanese golfer.
- Toshimitsu Kai (born 1956), Japanese golfer.
- Toshimitsu Motegi (茂木 敏充, born 1955), Japanese politician.
- Toshimitsu Otsubo (大坪 利満, born 1945), Japanese ice hockey player.
- Toshimitsu Saito (斎藤 利三, 1534–1582), Japanese samurai.
- Toshimitsu Suetsugu (末次 利光, born 1942), Japanese baseball player.
- Toshimitsu Tanaka (田中 利光, 1930–2020), Japanese composer.
- Toshimitsu Teshima (手嶋 敏光, born 1942), Japanese cyclist.
- Toshimitsu Yoshida (吉田 寿光, born 1963), Japanese football referee.
