= Stefan Kirev =

Bulgarian cyclist

Personal information
- Full name: Stefan Stefanov Kirev
- Born: 14 October 1942
- Died: 9 October 2021
- Height: 178 cm (5 ft 10 in)
- Weight: 75 kg (165 lb)

Cycling career
- Sport: Cycling

Stefan Kirev (Bulgarian: Стефан Кирев) (born 14 October 1942) was a former Bulgarian cyclist. He competed in the 1000m time trial at the 1964 Summer Olympics.
