= Sergio Bianchetto =

Italian cyclist (born 1939)

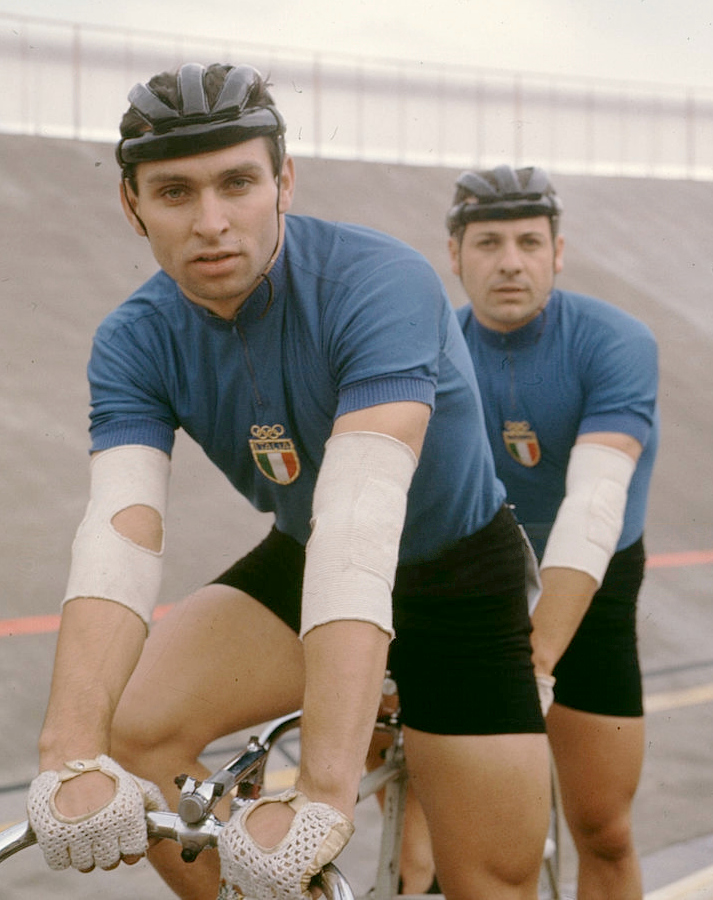
- Sergio Bianchetto (left) and Angelo Damiano at the 1964 Olympics

Personal information
- Full name: Sergio Bianchetto
- Born: 16 February 1939 (age 87) Brenta, Italy
- Height: 1.73 m (5 ft 8 in)
- Weight: 70 kg (154 lb)

Cycling career
- Sport: Cycling
- Discipline: Track
- Role: Rider
- Rider type: Sprinter
Medal record
Representing Italy
Men's track cycling
Olympic Games
Gold medal – first place	1960 Rome	Tandem
Gold medal – first place	1964 Tokyo	Tandem
Silver medal – second place	1964 Tokyo	Sprint
World championships
Gold medal – first place	1961 Zurich	Sprint
Gold medal – first place	1962 Milan	Sprint
Silver medal – second place	1963 Rocourt	Sprint
Bronze medal – third place	1964 Paris	Sprint

Sergio Bianchetto (born 16 February 1939) is a retired Italian track cyclist. He is the only cyclist to win two Olympic gold medals in the tandem, which he has done in 1960 and 1964; in 1964 he also won a silver in the 1000 m sprint. In 1964 Bianchetto and Damiano apparently lost in the semifinals to the German team 1:2, but the Germans were disqualified in the last race for moving out of their lane in the final sprint. Bianchetto won five national and two world titles, in 1961 and 1962, and set a world record over 200 m with flying start in 1960. After the 1964 Olympics he turned professional and retired in 1969.
