= Imants Bodnieks =

Latvian cyclist

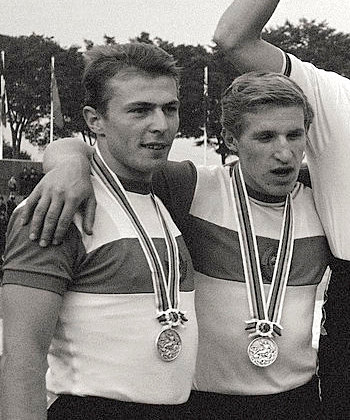
- Imants Bodnieks (left) and Viktor Logunov at the 1964 Olympics

Personal information
- Full name: Imant Dzhemsovich Bodnieks; Имант Джемсович Бодниекс
- Born: 20 May 1941 (age 85) Riga, Latvian SSR, Soviet Union
- Height: 1.73 m (5 ft 8 in)
- Weight: 72 kg (159 lb)

Cycling career
- Sport: Cycling
- Discipline: Track
- Role: Rider
- Rider type: Sprinter
Medal record
Men's track cycling
Representing the Soviet Union
Olympic Games
Silver medal – second place	1964 Tokyo	Tandem

Imants Bodnieks (born 20 May 1941) is a retired Latvian track cyclist. He competed at the 1960 Olympics in the 1000 m sprint and at the 1964 and 1968 Olympics in the tandem and won a silver medal in the tandem in 1964 together with Viktor Logunov. His father Džems Bodnieks was a prominent Latvian artist.
