= Karel Štark =

Czech cyclist

Personal information
- Born: 25 February 1942 (age 84) Plzeň, Protectorate of Bohemia and Moravia
- Height: 176 cm (5 ft 9 in)
- Weight: 73 kg (161 lb)

Cycling career
- Sport: Cycling

Karel Štark (born 25 February 1942) is a former Czech cyclist. He competed in the men's tandem at the 1964 Summer Olympics.
