= Oscar García (cyclist) =

Argentine cyclist

Personal information
- Born: 13 September 1941 (age 85)

Cycling career
- Sport: Cycling

Oscar García (born 13 September 1941) is a former Argentine cyclist. He competed in the sprint at the 1964 Summer Olympics.
