= Thomas Harrison (cyclist) =

Australian cyclist (born 1942)

Personal information
- Born: 13 May 1942
- Died: 7 February 2021 (aged 78)
- Height: 182 cm (6 ft 0 in)
- Weight: 75 kg (165 lb)

Cycling career
- Sport: Cycling

Thomas Harrison (13 May 1942 – 7 February 2021) was an Australian cyclist. He won a gold medal at the 1962 British Empire and Commonwealth Games in Perth and competed in the men's sprint at the 1964 Summer Olympics.
