= Christopher Church =

British cyclist (1940–2001)

Christopher Charles Nicholson Church
Personal information
- Born: 4 October 1940
- Died: 1 May 2001 (aged 60) Malibu, California, US
- Height: 170 cm (5 ft 7 in)
- Weight: 73 kg (161 lb)

Cycling career
- Sport: Cycling

Christopher Church (4 October 1940 – 1 May 2001) was a British cyclist, businessman and human powered flight pioneer. He competed in the men's sprint and men's tandem events at the 1964 Summer Olympics. He was multiple times a British champion on the track and a reserve for Great Britain at the 1960 Summer Olympics

After the death in 1945 of his father James Brindley Nicolson he was adopted by Fred and Elsie Church and adopted their surname.

Church worked as an aeronautic engineer for Hawker Siddeley and became involved, as a test pilot, in the HMPAC Puffin programme. According to his son, Church was the first to fly the plane in preliminary trials but was injured when it crashed.

He moved to the US in 1970 to work for the American arm of Spode and rose to become the CEO of the company. He was also a vice president of Gucci.
