= Muhammad Hafeez (cyclist) =

Pakistani cyclist

Personal information
- Full name: Chudhary Muhammad Hafeez
- Born: 1 October 1943 Kapurthala, India
- Died: 9 August 2011 (aged 67) Lahore, Pakistan
- Height: 172 cm (5 ft 8 in)
- Weight: 78 kg (172 lb)

Cycling career
- Sport: Cycling

Muhammad Hafeez (1 October 1943 – 9 August 2011) was a former Pakistani cyclist. He competed in the sprint, 1000m time trial and team pursuit events at the 1964 Summer Olympics.
