= Richárd Bicskey =

Hungarian cyclist (1936–2020)

Personal information
- Born: 4 October 1936 Budapest, Hungary
- Died: 21 June 2020 (aged 83)
- Height: 164 cm (5 ft 5 in)
- Weight: 74 kg (163 lb)

Cycling career
- Sport: Cycling

Richárd Bicskey (4 October 1936 – 21 June 2020) was a Hungarian cyclist. He competed in the men's sprint and men's tandem events at the 1964 Summer Olympics.
