= Zbysław Zając =

Polish cyclist

Personal information
- Born: 9 September 1933 Rożny, Poland
- Died: 7 January 1985 (aged 51)
- Height: 172 cm (5 ft 8 in)
- Weight: 72 kg (159 lb)

Cycling career
- Sport: Cycling

Professional team
- CWKS Warszawa

Zbysław Zając (9 September 1933 – 7 January 1985) was a Polish cyclist. He competed in the men's sprint at the 1964 Summer Olympics.
