= Angelo Damiano =

Italian cyclist (born 1938)

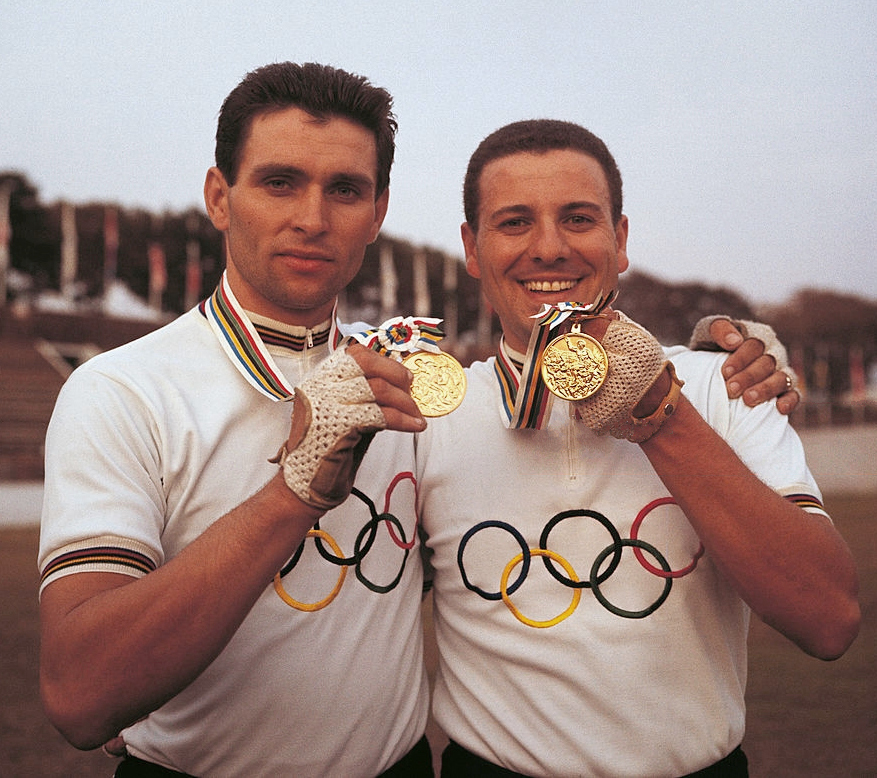
- Sergio Bianchetto (left) and Angelo Damiano (right) at the 1964 Olympics

Personal information
- Born: 30 September 1938 (age 88) Barra, Italy
- Height: 1.72 m (5 ft 8 in)
- Weight: 73 kg (161 lb)

Cycling career
- Sport: Cycling
- Discipline: Track
- Role: Rider

Professional teams
- 1965–1966: Termozeta Dei
- 1967–1968: Ignis
- 1969: Scic
- 1970–1972: Ferretti
Medal record
Men's track cycling
Representing Italy
Olympic Games
| Gold medal – first place | 1964 Tokyo | Tandem |
World Championships
| Bronze medal – third place | 1967 Amsterdam | Sprint |

Angelo Damiano (born 30 September 1938) is a retired Italian track cyclist. Together with Sergio Bianchetto he won a gold medal in the tandem at the 1964 Summer Olympics in Tokyo. They had easy semifinals, because their German competitors were disqualified, and won a close final against the Soviet team.

After winning the national amateur sprint title in 1964, in 1965 Damiano turned professional and won a bronze medal in the sprint at the 1967 World Championships.
