= Tsuyoshi Kawachi =

Japanese cyclist

Personal information
- Born: 4 January 1945 (age 81)
- Height: 173 cm (5 ft 8 in)
- Weight: 71 kg (157 lb)

Cycling career
- Sport: Cycling

Tsuyoshi Kawachi (河内 剛, Kawachi Tsuyoshi; born 4 January 1945) is a former Japanese cyclist. He competed in the men's sprint at the 1964 Summer Olympics.
