= Tim Phivana =

Cambodian cyclist

Personal information
- Born: 3 June 1940 (age 86)

Cycling career
- Sport: Cycling

Tim Phivana (born 3 June 1940) is a former Cambodian cyclist. He competed in the sprint at the 1964 Summer Olympics.
