= Suchha Singh =

Indian cyclist (born 1933)

Sucha Singh
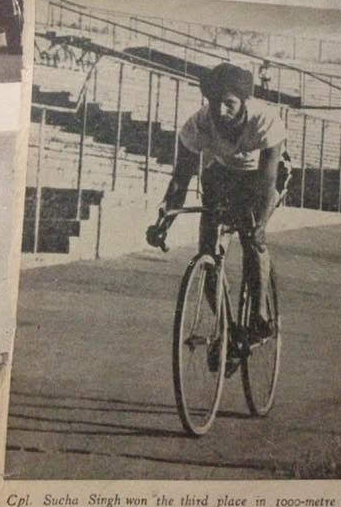
- Sucha Singh Saini riding his bike in 1958

Personal information
- Born: 21 July 1933 Ropar, Undivided Punjab, British India
- Height: 5 ft 10 in (178 cm)

Cycling career
- Sport: Cycling

Sucha Singh (born 21 July 1933) is an Indian former cyclist. He competed in the sprint at the 1964 Summer Olympics.
