= Fitzroy Hoyte =

Trinidad and Tobago cyclist

Personal information
- Born: 6 July 1940; Barataria, Trinidad and Tobago
- Died: 10 September 2008 (aged 68); Trinidad and Tobago

Fitzroy Hoyte (6 July 1940 – 10 September 2008) was a cyclist from Trinidad and Tobago who competed in two heats of the sprint event at the 1964 Summer Olympics.
