= Ulrich Schillinger =

German cyclist

Personal information
- Born: 16 February 1945 (age 81) Munich, Germany

Cycling career
- Sport: Cycling

Ulrich Schillinger (born 16 February 1945) is a German former cyclist. He competed in the sprint at the 1964 Summer Olympics.
