= Valery Khitrov =

Soviet cyclist

Personal information
- Born: 16 April 1941 (age 85)

Cycling career
- Sport: Cycling

Valery Khitrov (born 16 April 1941) is a former Soviet cyclist. He competed in the sprint at the 1964 Summer Olympics.
