= Eduardo Bustos =

Colombian cyclist

Personal information
- Full name: Eduardo Bustos Camacho
- Born: 23 April 1937 (age 89)
- Height: 180 cm (5 ft 11 in)
- Weight: 70 kg (154 lb)

Cycling career
- Sport: Cycling

Eduardo Bustos (born 23 April 1937) is a former Colombian cyclist. He competed in the 1000m time trial and Men's sprint events at the 1964 Summer Olympics.
