= Karel Paar =

Czech cyclist

Personal information
- Born: 3 January 1945 (age 81) Brno, Protectorate of Bohemia and Moravia
- Height: 180 cm (5 ft 11 in)
- Weight: 79 kg (174 lb)

Cycling career
- Sport: Cycling

Karel Paar (born 3 January 1945) is a former Czech cyclist. He competed in the men's tandem at the 1964 Summer Olympics.
