= Ferenc Habony =

Hungarian cyclist

Personal information
- Born: 26 February 1945 (age 81) Budapest, Hungary
- Height: 178 cm (5 ft 10 in)
- Weight: 75 kg (165 lb)

Cycling career
- Sport: Cycling

Ferenc Habony (born 26 February 1945) is a former Hungarian cyclist. He competed in the 1000m time trial, men's sprint and men's tandem events at the 1964 Summer Olympics.
