= Giovanni Pettenella =

Italian cyclist (1943–2010)

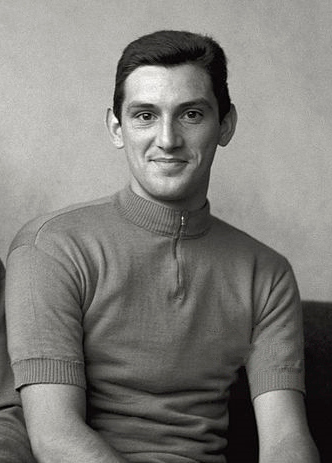
- Giovanni Pettenella at the 1964 Olympics

Personal information
- Full name: Giovanni Pettenella
- Born: 28 March 1943 Caprino Veronese, Italy
- Died: 20 February 2010 (aged 66) Milan, Italy
- Height: 1.78 m (5 ft 10 in)
- Weight: 73 kg (161 lb)

Cycling career
- Sport: Cycling
- Discipline: Track
- Role: Rider
- Rider type: Sprinter

Professional team
- Ciclistica Corsico, Milan
Medal record
Representing Italy
Men's track cycling
Olympic Games
Gold medal – first place	1964 Tokyo	Individual sprint
Silver medal – second place	1964 Tokyo	1000 m time trial
World Championships
Bronze medal – third place	1968 Rome	Individual sprint

Giovanni Pettenella (28 March 1943 – 19 February 2010) was an Italian track cyclist. At the 1964 Summer Olympics he won a gold medal in the sprint and a silver in the 1000 m time trial. In the semi-final of the 1,000 metres sprint Pettenella and Pierre Trentin set an Olympic record for standing still - 21 minutes and 57 seconds. After that he turned professional and competed until 1975. In 1968 he won a bronze medal in the sprint at the world championships.

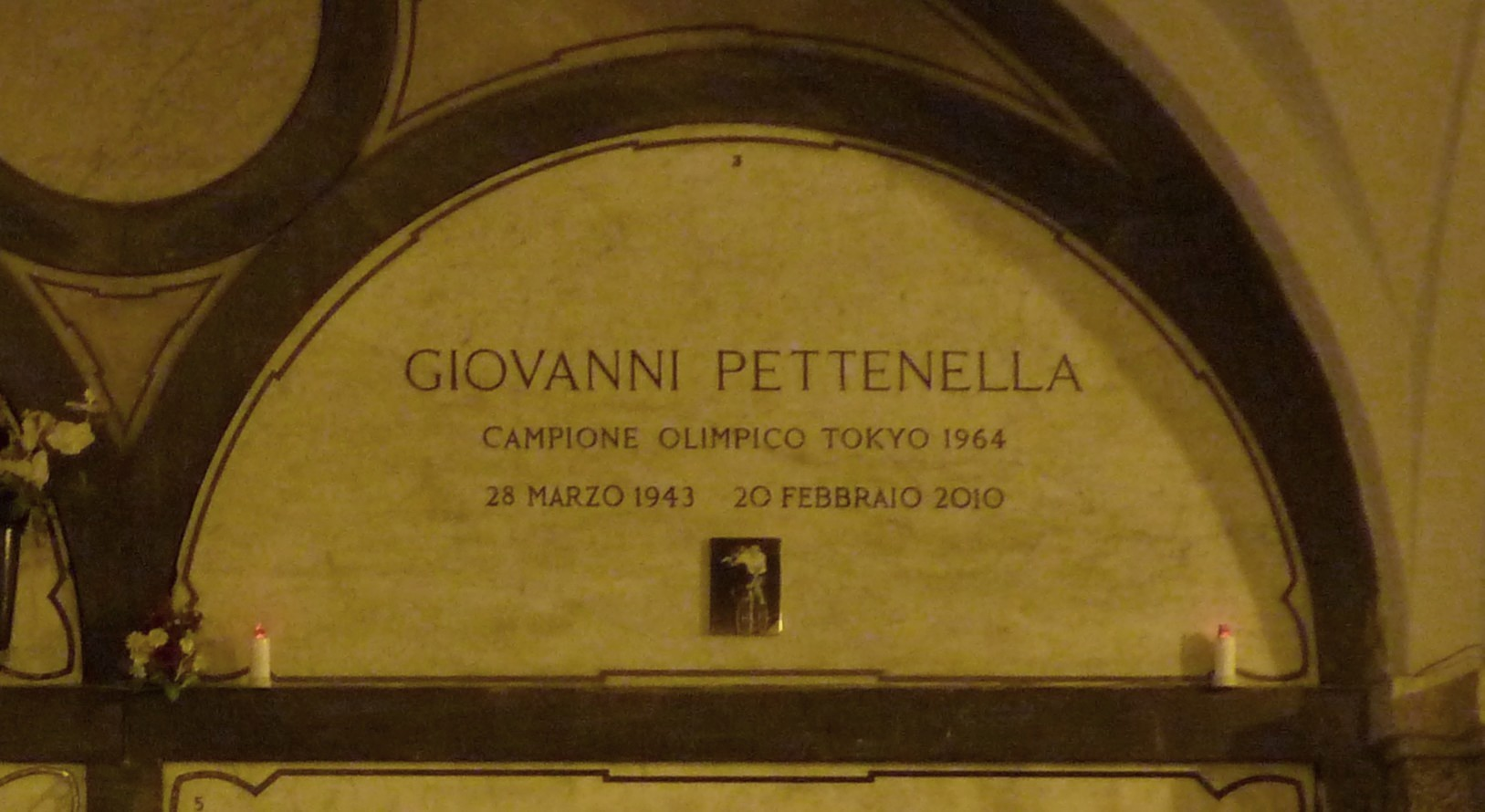
Pettenella's grave at the Monumental Cemetery of Milan, in 2015

He died in Milan, Italy, and is buried at the city's Monumental Cemetery.
