= Tan Thol =

Cambodian cyclist

Personal information
- Born: 2 April 1941 (age 85)
- Height: 161 cm (5 ft 3 in)
- Weight: 54 kg (119 lb)

Cycling career
- Sport: Cycling

Tan Thol (born 2 April 1941) is a former Cambodian cyclist. He competed in the 1000m time trial and men's sprint events at the 1964 Summer Olympics.
