= Viktor Logunov =

Russian cyclist (1944–2022)

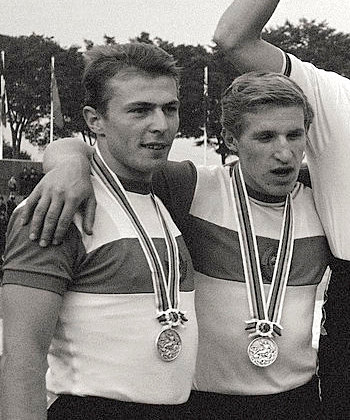
- Logunov (right) and Imants Bodnieks at the 1964 Olympics

Personal information
- Full name: Viktor Alekseyevich Logunov
- Born: 21 July 1944 Moscow, Russian SFSR, USSR
- Died: 10 October 2022 (aged 78)
- Height: 1.76 m (5 ft 9 in)
- Weight: 75 kg (165 lb)

Cycling career
- Sport: Cycling
- Discipline: Track
- Role: Rider
- Rider type: Sprinter
Medal record
Men's track cycling
Representing the Soviet Union
Olympic Games
Silver medal – second place	1964 Tokyo	Tandem

Viktor Alekseyevich Logunov (Russian: Виктор Алексеевич Логунов; 21 July 1944 – 10 October 2022) was a Russian track cyclist. He competed at the 1964 Olympics in the tandem and 2000 m sprint won a silver medal in the tandem with Imants Bodnieks. In retirement he coached track cycling and prepared the Unified Soviet team to the 1992 Olympics.
