= Katsuhiko Sato (cyclist) =

Japanese cyclist

Personal information
- Born: 18 May 1943 (age 83)
- Height: 166 cm (5 ft 5 in)
- Weight: 66 kg (146 lb)

Cycling career
- Sport: Cycling

Katsuhiko Sato (佐藤 勝彦, Satō Katsuhiko; born 18 May 1943) is a former Japanese cyclist. He competed in the 1000m time trial, and the men's sprint events at the 1964 Summer Olympics. From 1965 to 1996, he was a professional keirin cyclist with 455 wins and 8 championships over his career.
