= Leopoldshöhe =

- Municipality
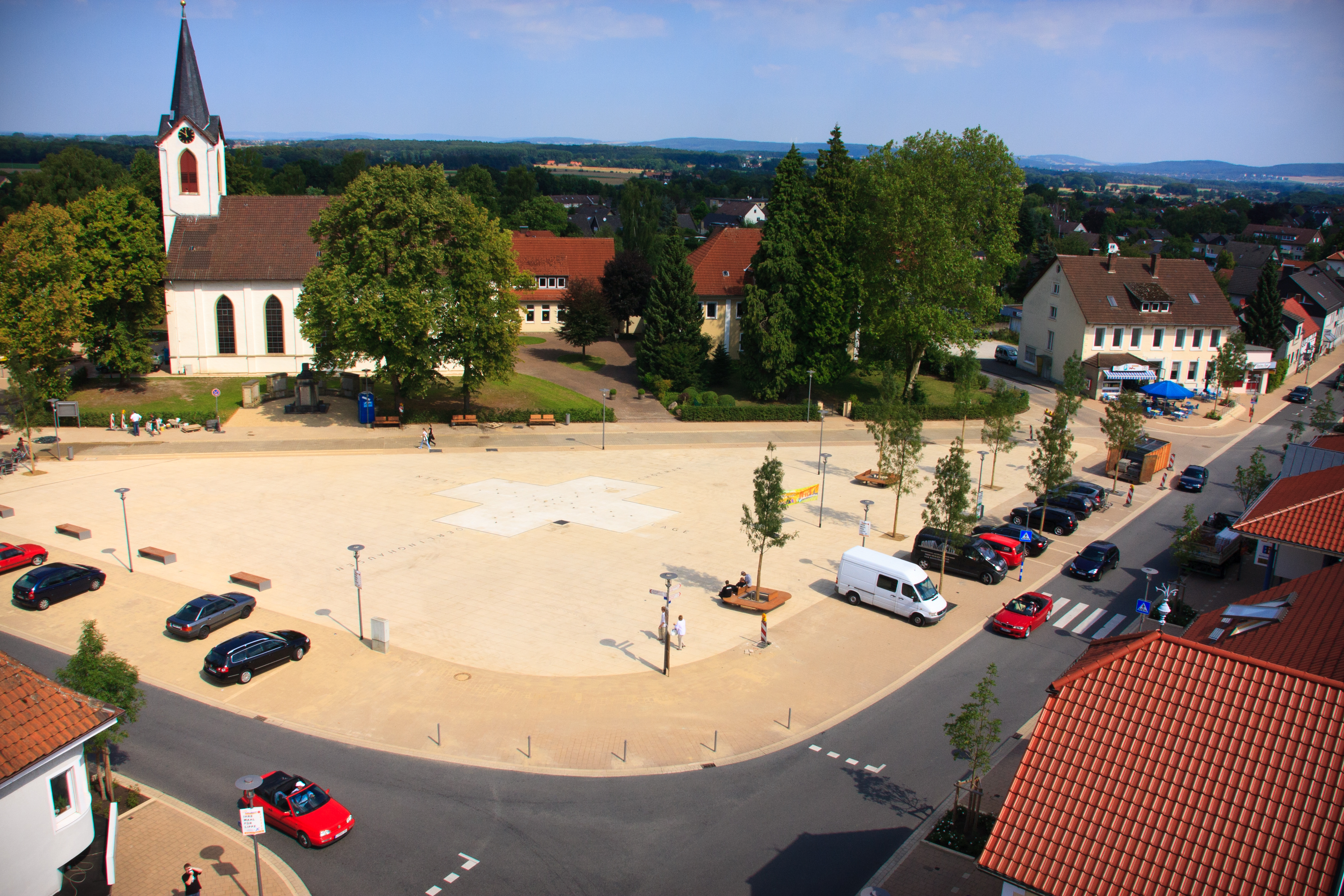

- Coat of arms

- Location of Leopoldshöhe within Lippe district
- Interactive map of Leopoldshöhe
- Location within Germany Location within North Rhine-Westphalia
- Coordinates: 52°01′00″N 08°41′29″E
- Country: Germany
- State: North Rhine-Westphalia
- Admin. region: Detmold
- District: Lippe

Government
  - Mayor (2020–25): Martin Hoffmann (SPD)

Area
  - Total: 36.93 km^{2} (14.26 sq mi)
- Elevation: 113 m (371 ft)

Population (2025-12-31)
  - Total: 17,175
  - Density: 465.1/km^{2} (1,205/sq mi)
- Time zone: UTC+01:00 (CET)
  - Summer (DST): UTC+02:00 (CEST)
- Postal codes: 33818
- Dialling codes: 05208, 05202, 05232, 05222
- Vehicle registration: LIP
- Website: www.leopoldshoehe.de

Leopoldshöhe (German pronunciation: [ˈleːopɔltsˌhøːə]; Low German: Höchte) is a municipality in the Lippe district of North Rhine-Westphalia, Germany, with ca. 17,000 inhabitants (2025).

Located in the rolling plains north of the Teutoburger Wald range, Leopoldshöhe consists of eight formerly independent municipalities: Asemissen, Bechterdissen and Greste to the south, Leopoldshöhe proper, Krentrup and Schuckenbaum at the center, and Nienhagen and Bexterhagen to the north. Both Asemissen and Leopoldshöhe proper have a pronounced infrastructure (supermarkets, gas stations, specialized shops, etc.).

Located only 10 km from the city of Bielefeld, the southern and central parts of the municipality today have a mostly suburban feel to them, but also contain several industrial zones, whereas the north is still mainly rural.

Asemissen is only a few hundred meters away from the A2 autobahn motorway, and (with the Oerlinghausen railway station) is on the railway line from Bielefeld to Detmold and Lemgo. A bus service connects almost all villages to the railway station.

== History ==
Local proper names still existing today - particularly of the village of Krentrup - indicate settlements in the area well before 800 AD. The estate of Niederbarkhausen, at the border between Asemissen and Oerlinghausen, is mentioned in the oldest surviving document about the area, which dates from 1036 AD. In 1616, a total of 55 farms and estates is counted in the area of today's municipality.

Since this large rural area was rather sparsely populated, there was no church and people had to walk to other communities to attend service, until, in 1850, a church was built exactly in the middle between the neighboring churches of Oerlinghausen and Schötmar. Leopold II, Prince of Lippe, attended the consecration and named the budding village around the church after himself. Today, Leopoldshöhe proper is the only one of the eight constituent villages to have a centralized structure with church, market square, etc.

== Population ==
Historical population

Year	Pop.	±% p.a.
1965	9,476	—
1970	10,459	+1.99%
1975	11,596	+2.09%
1980	12,665	+1.78%
1985	12,619	−0.07%
1990	13,744	+1.72%
1995	15,309	+2.18%

Year	Pop.	±% p.a.
2000	16,336	+1.31%
2005	16,198	−0.17%
2010	16,113	−0.11%
2015	16,401	+0.35%
2020	16,382	−0.02%
2025	17,175	+0.95%

Source: Landesdatabank Nordrhein-Westfalen
