= Per Sarto Jørgensen =

Danish cyclist (born 1944)

Personal information
- Born: 3 March 1944 (age 82) Midtjylland, Denmark

Cycling career
- Sport: Cycling

Per Sarto Jørgensen (born 3 March 1944) is a Danish former cyclist. He competed at the 1964 Summer Olympics and the 1968 Summer Olympics.
