= Toshimitsu Teshima =

Japanese cyclist

Personal information
- Born: 12 January 1944 (age 82)
- Height: 175 cm (5 ft 9 in)
- Weight: 70 kg (154 lb)

Cycling career
- Sport: Cycling

Toshimitsu Teshima (手嶋 敏光, Teshima Toshimitsu; born 12 December 1942) is a former Japanese cyclist. He competed in the men's tandem at the 1964 Summer Olympics. He was a professional keirin cyclist from 1965 to 1999, with 9 championships and 240 wins in his career.
