= Willi Fuggerer =

German cyclist (1941–2015)

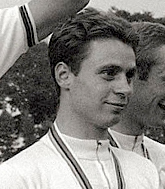
- Fuggerer at the 1964 Olympics

Personal information
- Full name: Wilhelm Fuggerer
- Born: 11 September 1941 Nürnberg, Germany
- Died: 2 September 2015 (aged 73)
- Height: 1.74 m (5 ft 9 in)
- Weight: 72 kg (159 lb)

Cycling career
- Sport: Cycling
Medal record
Men's cycling
Representing Germany
Olympic Games
Bronze medal – third place	1964 Tokyo	Tandem

Wilhelm "Willi" Fuggerer (11 September 1941 – 2 September 2015) was a German track cyclist. He competed at the 1964 Olympics in the 2000 m tandem and 1000 m sprint and finished in third and fifth place, respectively. In the tandem semifinals he and Klaus Kobusch apparently won 2:1 against the Italian team, but were disqualified in the third race for moving out of their lane in the final sprint.
