= Hideo Madarame =

Japanese cyclist

Personal information
- Born: 12 January 1944 (age 82) Shirakawa, Japan
- Height: 168 cm (5 ft 6 in)
- Weight: 65 kg (143 lb)

Cycling career
- Sport: Cycling

Hideo Madarame (班目 秀雄, Madarame Hideo; born 12 January 1944) is a former Japanese cyclist. He competed in the men's tandem at the 1964 Summer Olympics. From 1967 to 1996 he was a professional keirin cyclist, with a total of 24 championships and 440 wins in his career. He served as a coach for the national cycling team at the 2004 Summer Olympics as well as the head coach for the national cycling team at the 2008 Paralympic Games.
