= Pierre Trentin =

French cyclist (born 1944)

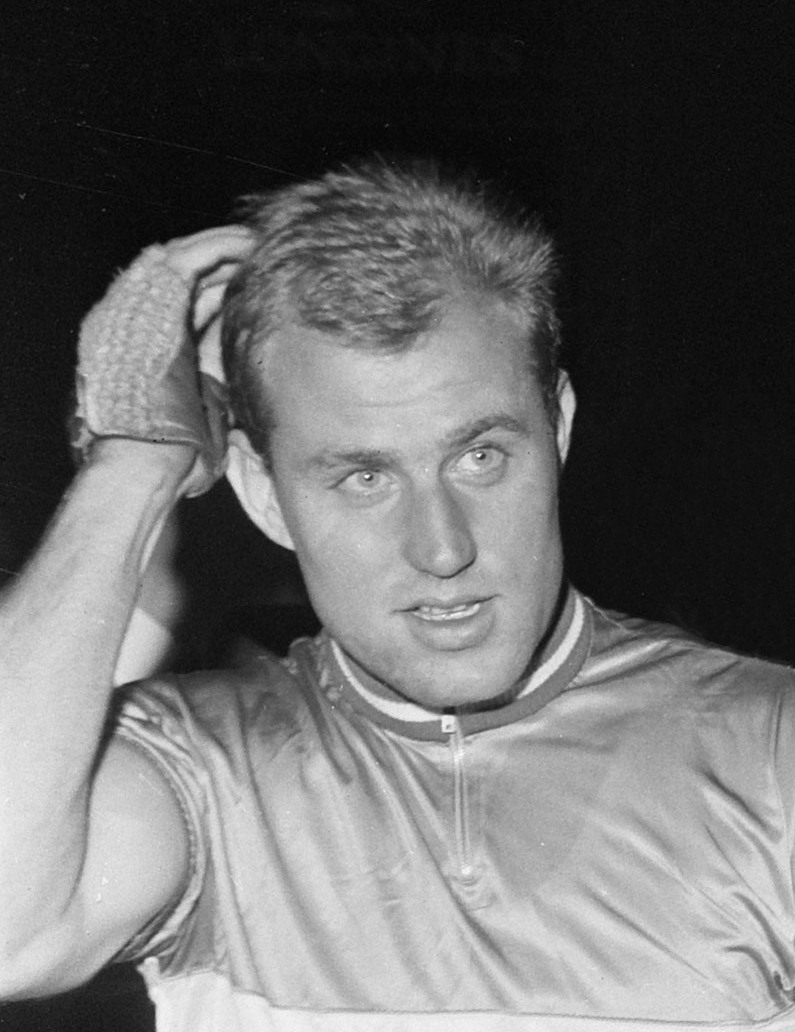
- Trentin in 1967

Personal information
- Born: 15 May 1944 (age 82) Créteil, France
- Height: 1.71 m (5 ft 7 in)
- Weight: 75 kg (165 lb)

Sport
- Sport: Cycling
Medal record
Representing France
Men's track cycling
Olympic Games
Gold medal – first place	1968 Mexico City	1 km time trial
Gold medal – first place	1968 Mexico City	Tandem
Bronze medal – third place	1964 Tokyo	1 km time trial
Bronze medal – third place	1968 Mexico City	1 km sprint
Track World Championships
Gold medal – first place	1964 Paris	Sprint
Gold medal – first place	1966 Frankfurt	1 km
Gold medal – first place	1966 Frankfurt	Tandem
Silver medal – second place	1966 Frankfurt	Sprint
Silver medal – second place	1967 Amsterdam	Tandem
Silver medal – second place	1967 Amsterdam	Sprint
Bronze medal – third place	1962 Milan	Sprint
Bronze medal – third place	1962 Liege	Sprint
Bronze medal – third place	1969 Brno	Tandem
Bronze medal – third place	1971 Varese	Tandem
Bronze medal – third place	1971 Varese	1 km

Pierre Trentin (born 15 May 1944) is a retired French cyclist who was active between 1961 and 1984. He was most successful in sprint track events, in which he won two gold and two bronze Olympic medals, as well as 11 medals at world championships. His only road title was junior champion of France in 1961. He won most of his tandem titles with Daniel Morelon, who was also his major rival in the individual sprint races.

In the semi-final of the 1,000 metres sprint at the Tokyo Olympic Games, Trentin and Giovanni Pettenella set an Olympic record for standing still - 21 minutes and 57 seconds.

On 7 November 1966, Trentin was appointed a Chevalier (Knight) of the Ordre national du Mérite.
