= Arie de Graaf =

Dutch politician

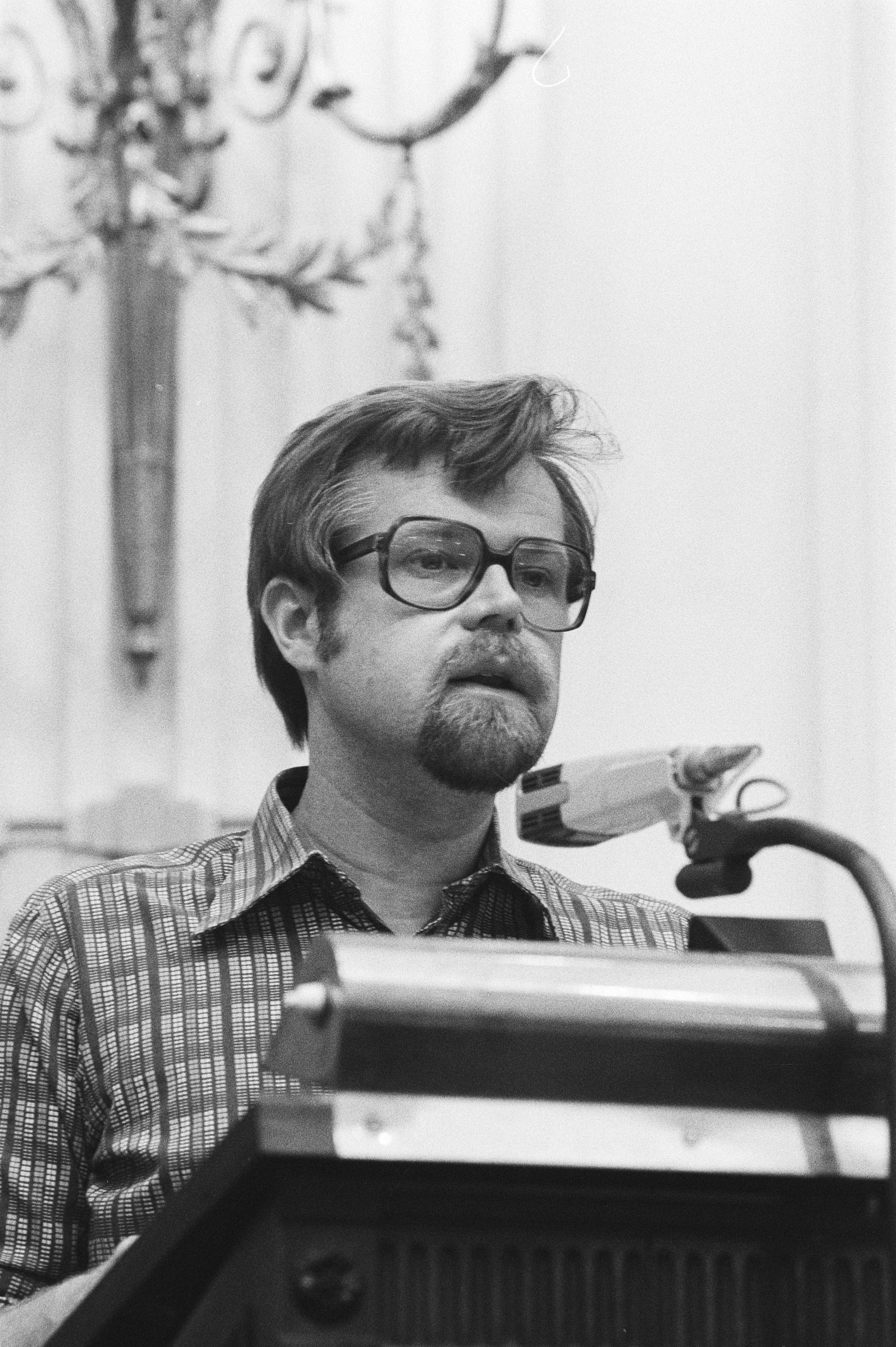
- De Graaf in 1980

Member of the House of Representatives of the Netherlands
- In office 1976–1981

Member of the municipal council of Arnhem
- In office 1970–1976

Personal details
- Born: 4 August 1947 (age 78) Arnhem
- Party: Partij van de Arbeid
- Education: Master of Laws
- Alma mater: Utrecht University
- Occupation: Politician, insurer, biologist, teacher
- Website: www.parlement.com/id/vg09llhwfpys/a_arie_de_graaf
- Nickname: Arie de Vraag

Arie de Graaf (born 4 August 1947, in Arnhem) is a Dutch insurer, biologist, teacher, and politician.

De Graaf studied Dutch law at Utrecht University (1972-1977), where he obtained a Master of Laws. He worked for a mutual insurance (1966-1976) and was at the same time member of the municipal council of Arnhem (1970-1976). In 1976 he was elected Member of the House of Representatives of the Netherlands for the Dutch Labour Party. He specialized in corporate law, public finance, and pension funds. De Graaf was opposed to atomic weapons and systematically voted against all related parts of the Dutch defense budget.

De Graaf was nicknamed "Arie de Vraag" because of the large number (357) of written information requests to the government that he posed during his tenure. He left the House of Representatives in 1981 and subsequently studied biology at Wageningen University, where he was a visiting scientist at the laboratory for plant taxonomy. From 1988 he taught at the Inholland University of Applied Sciences ("HEAO Alkmaar" at the time).

The Aroid plant species, Lagenandra dewitii, was described by de Graaf in honour of Hendrik de Wit.
