= Piet van der Touw =

Dutch cyclist

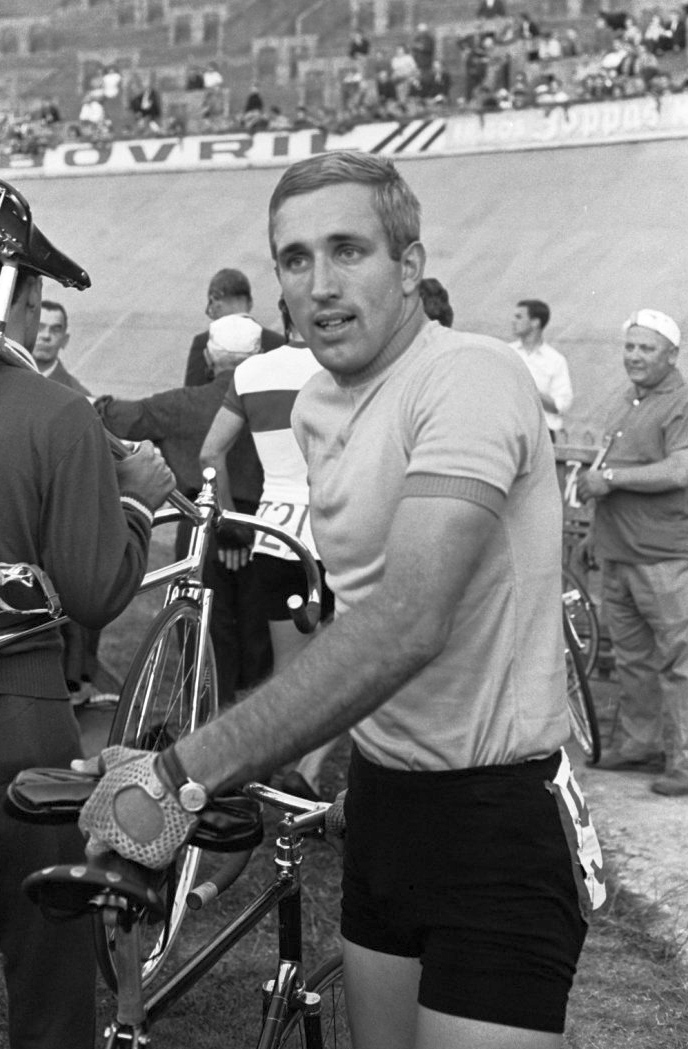
- Piet van der Touw in 1963

Personal information
- Born: 29 November 1940 (age 85) Rijswijk, the Netherlands
- Height: 1.83 m (6 ft 0 in)
- Weight: 80 kg (180 lb)

Sport
- Sport: Cycling

Pieter Carel Cornelis "Piet" van der Touw (born 29 November 1940) is a retired Dutch cyclist. He competed at the 1960 and 1964 Summer Olympics in five events in total. He finished in fourth place three times: twice in the 1000 m time trial (1960 and 1964) and once in the 2000 m tandem sprint. Nationally, he finished third in the sprint in 1966, 1976 and 1977. In 1965 het won a six-day race in Melbourne.

== See also ==
- List of Dutch Olympic cyclists
